= Fifteenth Amendment to the Constitution of Bangladesh =

The Fifteenth Amendment to the Constitution of Bangladesh was passed on 30 June 2011. This amendment made significant — 54 changes to the constitution. On 17 December 2024, it was declared partially illegal by the Supreme Court of Bangladesh.

== Amendments ==
- Incorporated four original fundamental principles of state policies of the 1972 constitution: nationalism, socialism, democracy and secularism.
- Increased number of reserved seats for women to 50 from existing 45.
- After article 7, it inserted articles 7A and 7B in a bid to end take over of power through extra-constitutional means. Article 7B declared the basic provisions of the constitution "non-amendable".
- Added a provision for the protection and improvement of the environment and biodiversity.
- Added a provision for protecting the culture of tribes, ethnic communities, and minor races .
- Abolished the caretaker government system which had been incorporated through 13th amendment to the constitution in 1996 but was later declared unconstitutional by the Supreme Court of Bangladesh.
- Declared Sheikh Mujibur Rahman as the Father of the Nation.
- Abolished referendum system from the constitution.
- Participation in election declared illegal for those who have been convicted of crimes against humanity during 1971 liberation war.
- State of emergency can not be continued for more than 120 days.
- Inserted three new schedules at the end of the constitution: the 7 March Speech of Sheikh Mujibur Rahman, the Declaration of Independence by Sheikh Mujibur Rahman on 25 March 1971 midnight, and the Proclamation of Independence by the Mujibnagar Government on 10 April 1971.

== Legality ==
After the Resignation of Sheikh Hasina, on 17 December 2024, the High Court Division of the Supreme Court declared some parts of the fifteenth amendment illegal, restoring the caretaker government and provision for referendums for constitutional amendments.
