= Government Seal of Bangladesh =

Emblem of the Government of Bangladesh

Government Seal of Bangladesh বাংলাদেশ সরকারের সীলমোহর

Versions
- Armiger: Government of Bangladesh
- Adopted: 1971 (55 years ago)
- Use: Government official documents, passports, and other government offices.

The Government Seal of Bangladesh (বাংলাদেশ সরকারের সীল) is the official seal of the People's Republic of Bangladesh. It is used by the Government of Bangladesh in official documents including passports.

The Government Seal inscribed on the front cover of a Bangladeshi passport

== Design of the seal ==
The seal features the same design elements as the first flag of Bangladesh in a circular setting. The outer white ring is shown with the caption of the official name of the Government of the People's Republic of Bangladesh (Bengali: গণপ্রজাতন্ত্রী বাংলাদেশ সরকার) with four red 5-pointed stars, symbolising nationalism, socialism, democracy, secularism, the four key principles of the Republic enshrined in the Constitution. In the center is the country map on a red disc.

== History of the seal ==
The seal was adopted as the temporary National Emblem of Bangladesh by the Provisional Government of the People's Republic of Bangladesh popularly known as the Mujibnagar Government, which was the government in exile of Bangladesh based in Kolkata, India, during the Bangladesh Liberation War. Formed in early April 1971, the provisional government confirmed the declaration of independence of East Pakistan made earlier in the same year by Bengali nationalist leader Sheikh Mujibur Rahman on 26 March.
