= Criticism of the Constitution of Bangladesh =

First page of the original Constitution of Bangladesh in Bangla

The Constitution of Bangladesh (Note: Bengali: বাংলাদেশের সংবিধান – Bangladesher Samvidhāna; officially, the Constitution of the People's Republic of Bangladesh (Bengali: গণপ্রজাতন্ত্রী বাংলাদেশের সংবিধান – Gaṇaprajātantrī Bangladesher Samvidhāna))—since its adoption by the "controversial" and virtually "one-party" Constituent Assembly of Bangladesh in 1972 has repeatedly come under criticism for its failure to build institutionalism in governance and politics, safeguard human rights, and ensure the independence of the judiciary and the legislature from the executive. Many denounced the Constitution for facilitating autocracy and labelled it as a "fascist constitution." The Fundamental Principles of State Policy in Part II are often dismissed as empty rhetoric due to their unjusticiability, while Fundamental Rights in Part III are constrained by extensive, imposable restrictions. The elevation of ideological principles above civil rights is commonly viewed as a defining trait of fascism. The Constitution's ideological alignment with “Mujibism”—embodying nationalism, socialism, democracy and secularism as its four foundational pillars—has also led some to label it the “Mujibist Constitution.”

Part IV vests executive power in the prime minister-led Cabinet; however, as it does not permit the removal of the prime minister, it results in a concentration of power in the prime minister's hands. This power is further reinforced by their dominant position within the Cabinet and control over MPs through party discipline and Article 70’s enforcement of slavish obedience to the party leader. Part IV further solidifies the prime minister’s power by granting them authority over Cabinet affairs, overshadowing other ministers and centralizing executive decisions.

Critics argued that the Constitution, due to poorly-defined fundamental rights, has enabled the continued enforcement of the repressive sections of British colonial laws such as the Penal Code of 1860 and the Code of Criminal Procedure of 1898, and facilitated the enactment of post-independence repressive laws such as the Special Powers Act of 1974, and the Cyber Security Act of 2023. Given the prime minister's extensive powers and citizen's limited civil rights, Badruddin Umar has famously termed the Constitution "A Constitution for Perpetual Emergency."

Several organizations and political parties, including the Rastro Sangskar Andolon and the Gonoparishad Andolon, (Note: Gonoparishad Andolon (Bengali: গণপরিষদ আন্দোলন) literally means 'Constituent Assembly Movement.') have long campaigned to convene a constituent assembly for the reform or drafting of a new constitution.

After the July Uprising in 2024, the Students Against Discrimination and the Jatiya Nagorik Committee put forward a five-point demand, including the abolishment of the 1972 Constitution. The interim government of Bangladesh, led by Muhammad Yunus, has already established a Constitutional Reform Commission and National Consensus Commission in 2024 with the aim of reforming or drafting a new inclusive, democratic constitution through an elected constituent assembly.

== Loopholes in rights provisions ==
Most of the constitutional fundamental rights are subject to extensive, imposable restrictions and these restrictions are not well-defined, creating constitutional ambiguity, which often enabled the government to enact repressive laws like the Special Power Acts of 1974, the Joint Drive Indemnity Act of 2003, the Digital Security Act of 2018, etc.

Classification of fundamental rights based on imposable restriction
Rights subject to reasonable restrictions	Rights subject to any restrictions	Miscellaneous
Article 36: Freedom of movement	Article 40: Freedom of profession or occupation	Article 46: Power to provide indemnity
Article 37: Freedom of assembly	Article 41: Freedom of religion (Note: Although article 41 of the Constitution neither expressly mentions that ‘reasonable restriction’ nor ‘any restriction’ may be on freedom of religion, it states that ‘subject to law’, freedom of religion shall exist for the citizens. It does not mention whether ‘reasonable restriction’ or ‘any restriction’ can be imposed on the substantive content of the freedom of religion in Bangladesh. In the explicit absence of ‘reasonable’ before law, it may be contemplated that ‘any restriction’ may be imposed on the freedom of religion by law subject to Article 31 of the Constitution.)	Article 47: Saving for certain laws
Article 38: Freedom of association	Article 42: Rights to property	Article 47A: Inapplicability certain articles
Article 39: Freedom of thought and conscience, and of speech	Article 45: Modification of rights in respect of disciplinary law	
Article 43: Protection of home and correspondence		

=== Article 33 and preventive detention ===
The Constitution allows for laws enabling preventive detention, as specified under Article 33. Although such provisions are intended for national security, they have been criticized for being used to detain political opponents, activists, and journalists without trial. This provision, which allowed the enactment of laws like the Special Powers Act of 1974, is viewed as giving the state significant power to suppress dissent, which is a common trait of authoritarian regimes. Article 33 also does not provide explicit avenues for detainees, especially under preventive detention, to seek judicial redress if their rights are violated under this Article. Without robust procedural safeguards or judicial recourse, preventive detention powers are often used to target dissenting voices or political opponents, potentially undermining democratic principles and freedom of expression.

=== Article 38 and limits of freedom of association ===
Article 38 guarantees the right to form associations and unions, subject to reasonable restrictions in the interest of morality or public order. The government has, at times, suppressed labor rights movements under the guise of maintaining public order, thereby limiting workers' ability to collectively bargain for better wages and working conditions.

The government has often invoked public order and security concerns to restrict the activities of political parties and their ability to hold peaceful assemblies. Such practices limit political pluralism and the ability of citizens to organize for political purposes, diminishing democratic freedoms.

=== Article 39 and constitutional ambiguity on free speech ===
Article 39 guarantees freedom of speech, expression, and the press, subject to reasonable restrictions for reasons including public order, decency, morality, the sovereignty of the state, "contempt of court, defamation or incitement" and even "friendly relations with foreign states." The term "reasonable restrictions" has not been clearly defined, allowing successive governments to interpret and expand its scope. Laws like the Digital Security Act of 2018, the Cyber Security Act operates within this constitutional ambiguity and was justified under the pretext of maintaining public order or state security, but it led to widespread suppression of dissent and critical journalism through arbitrary arrests of journalists and activists.

The judiciary's interpretation of what constitutes “reasonable” also vary significantly, resulting in inconsistent protection of free speech. Courts have at times upheld restrictions on speech deemed critical of the government or “anti-state,” leading to self-censorship and a chilling effect on public discourse.

"Friendly relations with foreign states" is a unique and broad phrase in the history of global constitutional law as it lacks precise definition, making it possible for authorities to interpret it in a way that could suppress legitimate criticism of international and global issues. For instance, criticism of foreign governments or multinational corporations could be restricted under this provision if deemed to harm diplomatic ties.

=== Article 44 and limited accessibility of remedies for rights violation ===
Article 44 gives citizens the right to approach the High Court for the enforcement of fundamental rights through writ petitions. However, there are several practical and procedural barriers that limit the effectiveness of this remedy. The legal process for filing writ petitions is often prohibitively expensive and complex, especially for marginalized and economically disadvantaged citizens. This makes access to constitutional remedies inequitable, restricting effective protection of fundamental rights to those who can afford legal representation. Bangladesh's judiciary suffers from significant backlogs and delays in adjudicating cases, including writ petitions. This delay undermines the timely enforcement of fundamental rights, leaving many citizens without effective relief from violations.

=== Article 46 and power to provide indemnity ===
Article 46 grants the Jatiya Sangsad the authority to indemnify individuals involved in human rights violations, effectively shielding them from legal consequences. This power, unchecked by sufficient oversight, weakens accountability, undermines human rights protections, and threatens judicial independence. The Joint Drive Indemnity Act of 2003 exemplifies the potential misuse of Article 46, enabling Parliament to protect state actors from accountability for serious abuses. Enacted to grant immunity to security forces involved in “Operation Clean Heart,” this law has been widely criticized due to reports of human rights violations during the operation, including torture, extrajudicial killings of 57 people, and arbitrary detentions. Indemnity provisions like these not only prevent victims from seeking justice but also allow systemic abuses to persist under the pretext of maintaining order.

== Criticism of executive dominance ==
Executive dominance in the Bangladeshi government is underscored by key constitutional provisions that concentrate power in the office of the prime minister, thereby undermining the separation of powers among the executive, legislative, and judiciary.

=== Prime minister’s extensive power ===
The Constitution vests the executive power of the Republic in the prime minister-led Cabinet, which is accountable to Parliament. This structure seems democratic but, in practice, results in a concentration of authority in the hands of the prime minister due to the dominant position within the Cabinet and the control over MPs through party discipline. The constitution further solidifies the prime minister's control by granting them authority over Cabinet affairs, overshadowing other ministers and centralizing executive decisions.

=== Article 70: Anti-defection provision ===
Article 70 prohibits MPs from voting against their party in Parliament, effectively granting the prime minister significant control over the legislative branch. Since MPs risk losing their seats if they oppose party lines, this article ensures that the ruling party's directives—often determined by the prime minister—are adhered to strictly. This provision essentially weakens parliamentary checks on the executive, as MPs cannot freely challenge or scrutinize executive actions, especially when the ruling party holds a majority. That is why Article 70 is often treated as a constitution impediment to parliamentary democracy.

== Criticism of the drafting process ==
The constitution was adopted by the 'controversial' and virtually "one-party" Constituent Assembly of Bangladesh. The Constituent Assembly was essentially controlled by the Awami League, with just three out of 404 members acting as opposition. While the assembly wasn't allowed to operate like a regular parliament, strict party rules were in place. Awami League members could only propose amendments that were approved in party meetings, and the risk of losing membership ensured discipline within the party. As a result, all members spoke in strong support of the bill, fully backing the party's position. And all the three members from outside the Awami League expressed dissenting opinions on the Constitution Bill, which was ultimately adopted as the Constitution of Bangladesh on November 4, 1972. Suranjit Sengupta (NAP(Wali) member of the assembly) and Manabendra Narayan Larma (PCJSS member of the assembly) argued that the Constitution Bill contained the shadow of the 1956 and the 1962 Constitutions of Pakistan. The Constitution was drafted at an accelerated pace of about nine months. Formed in April 1972, the Constitution Drafting Committee submitted a complete draft by October, and the Assembly adopted it by December. This swift adoption sacrificed comprehensive public consultation and deliberative inclusivity, particularly given the absence of a fully representative Constituent Assembly. This rush also limited the time for rigorous debate on long-term issues of governance, power distribution, and civil rights.

== General criticisms ==
=== Amendability ===
The Constitution has undergone 17 amendments, reflecting its susceptibility to political pressures over its pledge to ensure justice, equality, and liberty. Early amendments, especially the Fourth in 1975, curtailed judicial independence and amplified executive control, straying from the initial democratic vision.

== Notable critics ==
=== Badruddin Umar ===
Considering the unlimited powers granted to the prime minister and the people's limited civil rights, Marxist intellectual and historian Badruddin Umar has famously termed the Constitution "A Constitution for Perpetual Emergency."

Umar offered pointed criticisms of the Constitution, focusing on how the document and its drafting process failed to address the needs and aspirations of the broader masses who fought for independence in 1971. His critique centers on the Constitution's ideological alignment and the influence of elite political interests over the genuine demands for social and economic justice that emerged from the Liberation War.

Umar argued that the Constitution, crafted largely under the leadership of the Awami League and Sheikh Mujibur Rahman, reflected the interests of the political elite rather than those of the workers, peasants, and marginalized groups who formed the backbone of the independence struggle. He viewed the incorporation of principles like nationalism, socialism, democracy, and secularism as superficial and lacking practical commitment. He said that while socialism was declared a guiding principle, the Constitution did not establish structures that would meaningfully transform socio-economic power dynamics in favor of the poor, leaving existing class structures largely intact.

Umar also critiqued the Constitution for not sufficiently breaking from the colonial structures and laws inherited from Pakistan and the British era. This continuity, he believed, allowed for the persistence of power concentration in the hands of the elite, with insufficient decentralization and democratic engagement at the grassroots level. He also highlighted the influence of India's political approach in shaping the constitutional framework, seeing it as aligning too closely with India's interests and strategic objectives, rather than prioritizing the unique social and political context of Bangladesh.

=== Manabendra Narayan Larma ===
Manabendra Narayan Larma was the lone representative of the Chittagong Hill Tracts in the Constituent Assembly. He opposed the drafted Constitution of Bangladesh, which made official the primacy of Bengali culture and did not recognise the non-Bengali ethnic groups and tribal communities living in Bangladesh. Larma's demands were rejected by Sheikh Mujibur Rahman, who reportedly said that the tribal peoples should adopt Bengali culture and identity and threatened to forcibly settle Bengalis in the Hill Tracts and convert the local people into a minority in their own province. Larma continued to fight for the rights of the indigenous people and is quoted as saying:

Under no definition or logic can a Chakma be a Bengali or a Bengali be a Chakma. A Bengali living in Pakistan cannot become or be called a Punjabi, Pathan or Sindhi and any of them living in Bangladesh cannot be called a Bengali. As citizens of Bangladesh we are all Bangladeshis but we also have a separate ethnic identity, which unfortunately the Awami League (the then-ruling party) leaders do not want to understand.

=== Abul Mansur Ahmed ===
Abul Mansur Ahmad discussed Bangladesh's constitution in writings. He raised two types of questions. Firstly, he asked about the usage of the Bengali language in the constitution. He opined that the Bengali language used in writing the constitution should be maintained. Otherwise, building a rich stock of Bengali words will not be deemed possible.

=== Farhad Mazhar ===
Farhad Mazhar also criticized the Constitution, focusing on its origins and the political implications of its provisions. His criticism centers around the idea that the 1972 Constitution failed to truly represent the diverse political aspirations of the people who fought for independence. He views the document as a product of a narrow, elite-driven process that did not adequately reflect the revolutionary spirit and demands of the liberation struggle.

Mazhar emphasized that the Constitution's framework was influenced by colonial concepts, which he believed are inherently inadequate for addressing the political realities of post-independence Bangladesh. He argued that this legacy of colonial thought led to the continuation of a state structure that privileges central authority and failed to fully embrace the rights and aspirations of marginalized communities, such as indigenous groups in the Chittagong Hill Tracts.

Mazhar's criticisms extend to the Constitution's handling of secularism, which he believes was implemented as a political slogan rather than as a deeply rooted societal value. He questions whether the state's commitment to secularism was more about suppressing Islamist opposition than about genuinely accommodating diverse religious beliefs within the national framework.
