= Mujibism =

Bangladeshi political ideology

Mujibism (Bengali: মুজিববাদ, romanized: Mujibbad) is a political ideology based on the ideas of Sheikh Mujibur Rahman, the founding father and first president of the People's Republic of Bangladesh. Mujibism consists of four fundamental policies: nationalism, socialism, democracy, and secularism. On 7 June 1972, he said that before the country's liberation, the slogans were the Six Point, now the slogans were the four pillars. When the Constitution of Bangladesh was adopted in 1972, the four pillars became the four fundamental state policies of Bangladesh.

== Background ==
Sheikh Mujib's political views were formed by his experience and participation in the liberation movements during both the British period and Pakistani period. Abdul Gaffar Chowdhury opined that though Mujib was a close political disciple of Huseyn Shaheed Suhrawardy, his political character got shape under the influence A. K. Fazlul Huq, Abul Hashim, Subhas Chandra Bose, and Abdul Hamid Khan Bhashani.

== Principles ==
The four stars in the National Emblem of Bangladesh (left) and Flag of Bangladesh Awami League (right) represent the four fundamental principles of Mujibism: nationalism, socialism, secularism, and democracy

=== Nationalism ===
Sheikh Mujibur Rahman believed in language-based "Inclusionist nationalism". He believed that all Bangladeshis are Bengali. According to him, the Bengali language was the first pillar of nationalism. To him, the Bengali language was the quintessential element of Bengali identity binding together a culturally diverse region. He said that he would implement Bengali in all domains of life immediately after taking power. On 12 March 1975, he gave order to use Bengali in all government activities.

=== Socialism ===
Socialism is the second pillar of Mujibism. He said that socialism in Bangladesh would be native and democratic. Socialism is considered in the Constitution as "an instrument for the establishment of an exploitation-free society". He also made it clear that he did not want the socialism of China or Russia like that of Lenin-Marx-Engels or Mao Zedong. He wanted socialism in his own form, which he called the "democracy of the exploited". He dreamed of Bangladesh without discrimination in the mix of democracy and socialism. He said that the poor own the country and its all property, not the exploiters.

=== Democracy ===
Sheikh Mujibur Rahman was a staunch advocate of democracy, emphasizing its pivotal role in governing Bangladesh. He articulated a clear vision, asserting that democratic rights were fundamental, and the collective will of the people should guide the trajectory of the nation. According to Mujib, governance would be determined by the electorate, ensuring a government elected by the people themselves. He adamantly believed that true power did not lie in the barrels of guns, but rather in the hands of the populace, who were the ultimate custodians of authority. Mujib's perspective on governance was distinct. He regarded government officials and bureaucrats as public servants, underscoring their duty to the people. He stood in firm opposition to military rule, contending that military might alone could not safeguard sovereignty; it was the citizenry who held that responsibility. Mujib's aspiration was to forge a path to socialism within the framework of a democratic system, envisioning Bangladesh as an exemplar of a democratic socialist state.

=== Secularism ===
Secularism is the fourth pillar of Mujibism. Secularism refers to the separation of state and religion. In this case, no law of the state is dependent on any particular religion, this is a position where religious beliefs do not affect the government. The state does not interfere or favor any religion. Secularism does not mean irreligion, the state gives importance to all religions with equal opportunity and freedom. This is Mujib's philosophy of uprooting extremism and uniting the thousand-year-old Bengalis in a bond of harmony and forming a non-communal Bangladesh state. In the manifesto announced before the 1970 elections and in every public meeting, he spoke of building a state of harmony without discrimination of caste and religion. After the independence in 1972, when the constitution of Bangladesh was framed, secularism was adopted as the basic principle of state governance. Later, he kept it as one of the goals during the announcement of BAKSAL.

=== Others ===
As an opponent of colonialism and imperialism, Sheikh Mujib expressed solidarity with liberation movements of occupied nations in different colonies. Mujib was also pacifist and was involved in Non-Aligned Movement. His ideology supports and encourages global peace and usually has anti-war stance, unless a nation is under attack. Mujibism ideology promotes and encourages rational and logical thinking among people. It also includes scientific minded thinking, thus Bangabandhu Sheikh Mujibur Rahman introduced science based education in the country, so that people of the country can have the ability of free thinking based on logic, rationality, reasoning and science and also emphasised on the development of science and technology for the betterment of the country. Mujibism fiercely opposes superstitions and dogmas that holds the development of the nation back, similar to Atatürk's Kemalism ideology. Bangabandhu Sheikh Mujibur Rahman, also ensured people's rights, freedom of expression and individual freedom in the country, as the philosophy of Mujibism supports the universal human rights, for a better humanity and nation. Mujibism also promotes environmentalism, alongside science. Bangabandhu Sheikh Mujibur Rahman used to plant trees by himself often and promoted tree planting, because he believed that both the country and world's prosperity and peace also lies in the green and clean environment of the nation. Under his rule, his government took several initiatives to plant trees, maintain the biodiversity, and protect the forests, rivers, and the environment of Bangladesh.

== Legacy ==
When the Constitution of Bangladesh was adopted in 1972, the four pillars become the four fundamental state policies of Bangladesh.

After the victory of the Awami League in 2008, Mujib's daughter Sheikh Hasina converted Mujibism into a cult of personality around her father.
