= Socialism in Bangladesh =

The four stars in the National Emblem of Bangladesh represent the four fundamental principles of the constitution: nationalism, socialism, democracy, and secularism. Like most other socialist countries, sheaves of paddy in the borders represent the agricultural workers as a symbol of socialism.

Socialism (Bengali: সমাজতন্ত্র) is one of the fundamental principles of the Constitution of Bangladesh, along with nationalism, democracy and secularism. The constitution names Bangladesh as a people's republic, and declares all powers to be vested to the people. However, in Bangladeshi constitutional law, the term "socialism" is generally used to describe the state's goal to construct an exploitation-free society, rather than its original meaning and implementation, which is characterised by social ownership of the means of production, as opposed to private ownership. The constitution allows cooperative and private ownership along with state ownership.

Socialist and democratic socialist political parties played a key role in the independence movement of both British India and Bangladesh. Upon the independence in 1971, the country's founding leaders shaped the economy of Bangladesh as along state-led, socialistic lines as described in the constitution while maintaining a parliamentary democratic system. But due to economic mismanagement and political turmoil, the economy stagnated, with the deadly famine of 1974 further creating a humanitarian crisis.

In 1975, the country's political structure was reorganised into a one-party state with BAKSAL being the sole legitimate political party. After the 15 August 1975 Bangladeshi coup d'état and 1982 Bangladeshi coup d'état, reformist military leaders would redefine socialism with social justice in 1979 and eventually introduce market and property reforms to push to a capitalist system. In 2011, the term "socialism" and "socialist" were again redefined to make the constitution more in line with the original document, but the country remained a liberal mixed economy.

== Constitution ==
The words "socialism" and "socialist" appear several times in the Bangladeshi constitution. In the constitution, the concept of socialism seems to be more fiscal and social then political. The preamble briefly mentions the socialist principle and aim of the state:

"...Pledging that the high ideals of nationalism, socialism, democracy and secularism, which inspired our heroic people to dedicate themselves to, and our brave martyrs to sacrifice their lives in, the national liberation struggle, shall be the fundamental principles of the Constitution; Further pledging that it shall be a fundamental aim of the State to realise through the democratic process a socialist society, free from exploitation a society in which the rule of law, fundamental human rights and freedom, equality and justice, political, economic and social, will be secured for all citizens;..."

Article 7 declares the people's relationship with the state:

"All powers in the Republic belong to the people, and their exercise on behalf of the people shall be effected only under, and by the authority of, this Constitution."

Article 8 of the re-describes the preamble's reference to socialism as the fundamental principle:

"The principles of nationalism, socialism, democracy and secularism, together with the principles derived from those as set out in this Part, shall constitute the fundamental principles of state policy."

Article 10 defines the characteristics of the socialist economy and freedom from exploitation:

"A socialist economic system shall be established with a view to ensuring the attainment of a just and egalitarian society, free from the exploitation of man by man."

Further, Article 14 of the constitution pledges to ensure the emancipation of the peasants and workers:

"It shall be a fundamental responsibility of the State to emancipate the toiling masses the peasants and workers and backward sections of the people from all forms of exploitation."

Likewise to the socialist states, Article 17 calls for free and compulsory education system:

"The State shall adopt effective measures for the purpose of establishing a uniform, mass oriented and universal system of education and extending free and compulsory education to all children to such stage as may be determined by law."

Article 20 of the constitution best describes the socialist features of economy with the famous Marxist phrase "from each according to his abilities, to each according to his work", inspiring from the Soviet constitution:

"Work is a right, a duty and a matter of honour for every citizen who is capable of working, and everyone shall be paid for his work on the basis of the principle “from each according to his abilities, to each according to his work”."

== History ==
=== Early history ===
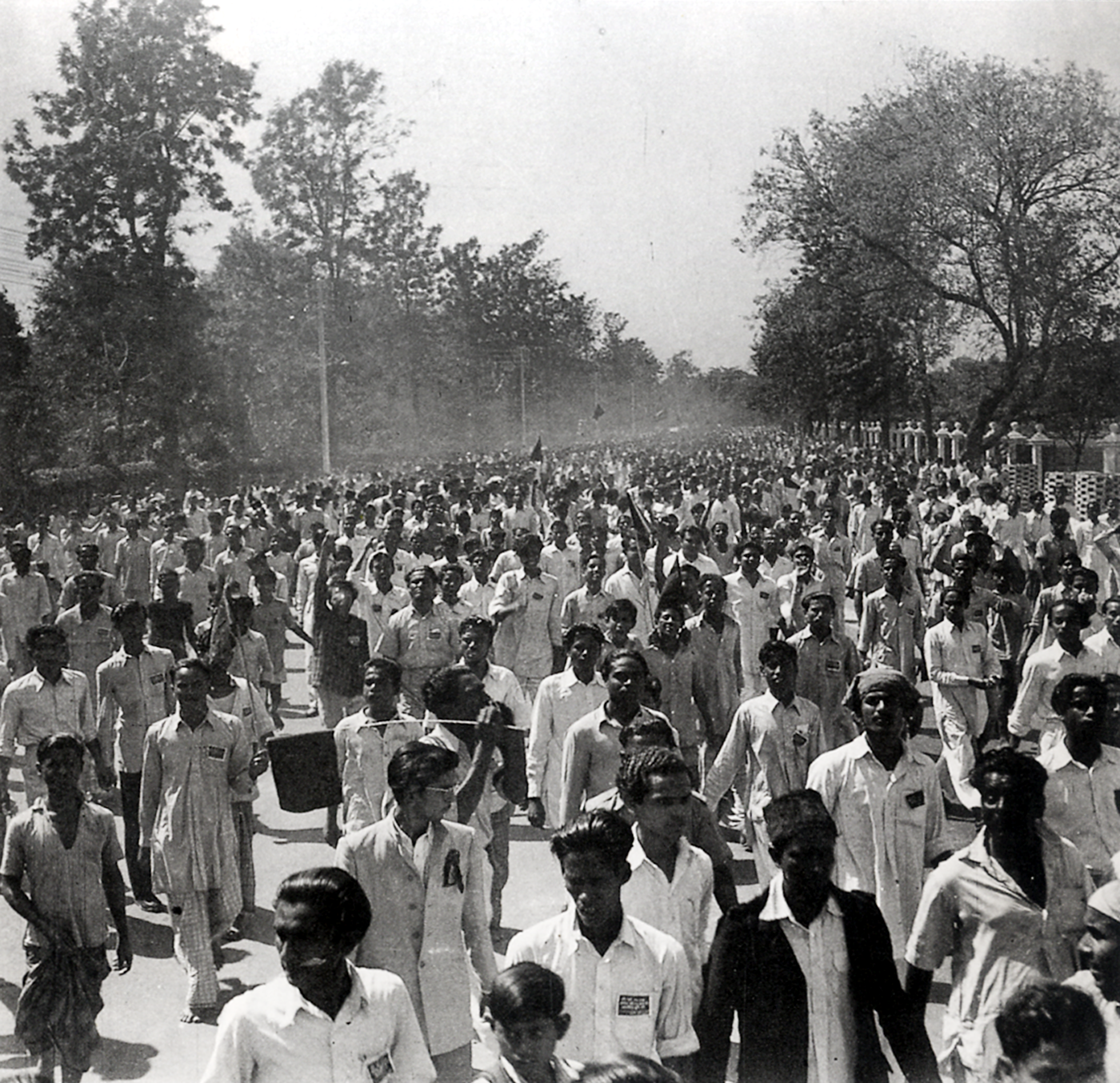
Socialist parties played an influential role in staging the massive protests for the Bengali language movement which led the destruction of Muslim League in East Pakistan, 1950s.

Before the partition, region of Bengal was one of the important centres of revolutionary activities in British India. Bengali leaders played a vital role to introduce and assemble socialism as well as communism in India, such as Muzaffar Ahmad, co-founder of the Communist Party of India.

After the partition, communist activities were reorganised in newly established Pakistan. In 1949, the Awami Muslim League, the predecessor of the modern Awami League, was established with the aim of establishing an exploitation-free society and the abolishment of the zamindar system. During the 1954 provincial elections in East Pakistan, the Awami League-led United Front gained the exclusive mandate in East Pakistan. Earlier in 1950, the Communist Party of Pakistan played a major role in labour strikes in support of the language movement. The Communist Party, with support from the United Front, formed a democratic government in East Pakistan. In 1958, the government in East Pakistan was dismissed by the central government.

=== Mujib era (1972–1975) ===
After the Bangladesh Liberation War in 1971, some socialistic approaches were taken by the Government of Bangladesh, increasing state participation in the productive activities of the economy, with the goal of improving the economic status of the war ridden country. Implemented by Sheikh Mujibur Rahman's ideology of Mujibism, the state took control of economic development and seized abandoned Pakistani assets. On 26 March 1972 all banks (excluding the branches of foreign banks), and all insurance companies, were nationalised.

Sheikh Mujibur Rahman, the first president and the "founding father" of the country, advocated his interpretation of socialism and secularism in the country. According to him, the country's wealth belonged to all the people of Bangladesh. Everybody would have share in whatever would be produced. Exploitation would be stopped. The constitution was highly dominated by socialist ideas, establishing socialism as one of its four fundamental principles, though the government's actual policies reflected state-managed nationalism rather than genuine socialism.

Dissatisfaction with post-war corruption, economic hardship, famine, Indian influence on policy, and the government's failure to implement radical land or scientific socialist reforms led to a left-wing insurgency in the country, and many anti-AL organisations broke out, like the Jatiya Samajtantrik Dal (JaSaD) and Proletarian Party of East Bengal. To counter the insurgency the Jatiya Rakkhi Bahini (JRB; National Security Force) was formed in 1972. Widely regarded as the armed wing of the ruling Awami League, the force swore an oath of loyalty directly to Sheikh Mujibur Rahman and became involved in widespread human rights abuses, including political killings, death squad shootings, enforced disappearances, and rape.

The economy also saw a backslide. The reformation process left only small and cottage industries for the private sector. The public sector expanded rapidly, but its share of the GDP and in total productive efforts was insignificant. This was because the agricultural sector was left to the private sector, which comprised about 80% of the national economy. In 1974, a severe famine broke out in the country, which was caused by corruption and economic mismanagement.

On 24 February 1975, due to increasing insurgency and political and economic mismanagement, Sheikh Mujibur Rahman announced a political and economic restructuring program, named the Second Revolution. Using the powers granted to him by the fourth amendment of the constitution, he formed a new political party, the Bangladesh Krishak Sramik Awami League (BaKSAL). It would be the only party allowed in Parliament, with Bangladesh becoming a one-party state. The party advocated for state socialism as a part of its reforms under the theory of Second Revolution. BaKSAL was the decision making council to achieve the objectives of the Second Revolution. The government also restricted civil liberties and most newspapers were banned.

Growing insurgency, political and economic mismanagements and JRB atrocities formed widespread discontent and anti-Mujibist sentiment within factions. On 15 August 1975, Mujib along with his most of the family members was assassinated. Four of his closest allies and leading figures of the Revolution were killed on 3 November in that year. With the assassination of Sheikh Mujibur Rahman, BaKSAL was dissolved, and Second Revolution failed. It was removed from the constitution and replaced with a multi-party state in April 1979.

=== Post-Mujib era ===
After the assassination of Mujib in 1975, new military leaders launched a de-Mujibization and liberalisation programme to develop a capitalist economy. During the years of military rule that followed under Ziaur Rahman (1975-1981) and Hussain Muhammad Ershad (1982-1990), socialist policies and rhetoric were abandoned. Zia withdrew most of the policies of the Second revolution and reintroduced a multi-party representative system. Liberal and progressivist political parties were revived, and JaSad as well as other revolutionary Marxist–Leninist political parties were crushed during the post-coup purges. Relationships with United States and other Western Bloc countries also improved by that time.

The Economy of Bangladesh saw de-socialisation as well as de-centralisation by this time. Many state-owned enterprises were privatised like banking, telecommunication, aviation, media, and jute. Trade liberalisation and exports promoted. Economic policies aimed at encouraging private enterprise and investment, privatising public industries, reinstating budgetary discipline, and liberalising the import regime were accelerated.

=== Contemporary Bangladesh ===
Today, contemporary Bangladesh has among the most liberalised economies of South Asia. It is characterised as a developing market economy. The Awami League, the party which once promoted its interpretation of socialism in the country, later embraced neoliberal authoritarian capitalism during its subsequent terms in office (1996–2001 and especially 2009–2024). In 1991, Awami League president and Prime Minister of Bangladesh Sheikh Hasina claimed that socialism was a failed system.

== Parties ==
=== Registered ===
- Bangladesh Jatiya Samajtantrik Dal
- Bangladesh National Awami Party (Bhasani)
- Bangladesh National Awami Party (Muzaffar)
- Communist Party of Bangladesh
- Communist Party of Bangladesh (Marxist–Leninist) (Barua)
- Ganatantri Party
- Jatiya Gano Front
- Jatiya Samajtantrik Dal
- Jatiya Samajtantrik Dal (Rab)
- Krishak Sramik Janata League
- Revolutionary Workers Party of Bangladesh
- Socialist Party of Bangladesh
- Socialist Party of Bangladesh (Marxist)
- Workers Party of Bangladesh

=== Unregistered ===
- Biplobi Communist Party
- Communist Party of Bangladesh (Marxist)
- Communist Party of Bangladesh (Marxist–Leninist) (Dutta)
- Communist Party of Bangladesh (Marxist–Leninist) (Umar)
- Maoist Bolshevik Reorganisation Movement of the Purba Banglar Sarbahara Party
- New Biplobi Communist Party
- Proletarian Party of East Bengal
- Purbo Banglar Communist Party
- Revolutionary Communist League of Bangladesh
- Sramik Krishak Samajbadi Dal

== See also ==
- Economy of Bangladesh
- Secularism in Bangladesh
- Democracy in Bangladesh
- Politics of Bangladesh
- Mujibism
