= Bangladesh Italian Marble Works Ltd. v. Government of Bangladesh =

2010 Supreme Court of Bangladesh case

Bangladesh Italian Marble Works Ltd v. Government of Bangladesh
- Court: Supreme Court of Bangladesh

Court membership
- Judges sitting: Chief Justice Mohammad Tafazzul Islam; Justice Mohammad Fazlul Karim; Justice Mohammad Abdul Matin; Justice Bijan Kumar Das; Justice Mohammad Muzammel Hossain; Justice Surendra Kumar Sinha

Bangladesh Italian Marble Works Ltd. v. Government of Bangladesh is a case of the Appellate Division of the Supreme Court of Bangladesh. In a landmark verdict delivered in 2010, the court overturned the fifth amendment to the Constitution of Bangladesh, enacted in 1979, and reinforced the secular democratic character of the Bangladeshi republic.

== Facts ==
In 2000, the owner of the Moon Cinema Hall in Dhaka filed a writ petition under Article 102 of the constitution claiming that the declaration of the cinema hall as an "abandoned property" was unlawful. It sought a direction upon the government to return the premises to their original owners. In that writ petition, the petitioners challenged the constitutionality of the Fifth Amendment Act 1979, which validated Martial Law Proclamation Orders between 1975 and 1979. A verdict was reached on 29 August 2005 in the High Court Division, in which Justice A. B. M. Khairul Haque and Justice A. T. M. Fazle Kabir declared the Fifth Amendment Act 1979 unlawful and directed the government of Bangladesh to return the Moon Cinema Hall to its original owners. The erstwhile Bangladesh Nationalist Party-led government appealed to the Appellate Division and obtained a stay on the High Court Division's judgement. In 2010, the Appellate Division dismissed both the leave appeals and upheld the judgment of the High Court Division subject to few modifications.

== Judgement ==
The Appellate Division of the Supreme Court declared the Fifth Amendment to the Constitution of Bangladesh null and void. It ruled that martial law was illegal and unconstitutional. Hence, all martial law proclamations were also illegal.

== Significance ==
The verdict invalidated proclamation orders issued by the Chief Martial Law Administrator between 1975 and 1979, including the removal of secularism as a fundamental principle from the constitution. The verdict was implemented by the Constitution (Fifteenth Amendment) Act 2011 in the Parliament of Bangladesh.

The verdict overturned earlier judicial precedents in Bangladesh and Pakistan, in which the courts sought to support coups on the grounds of the doctrine of necessity. The verdict was interpreted as a victory for democracy and parliamentary supremacy. Martial law was declared to be illegal for good.

== See also ==
- Federation of Pakistan v. Maulvi Tamizuddin Khan
- Article 70 of the Constitution of Bangladesh
