= Constitution of Bangladesh =

Supreme law of Bangladesh

- First page of the original Constitution of Bangladesh in Bangla

Overview
- Jurisdiction: Bangladesh
- Ratified: 4 November 1972; 53 years ago
- Date effective: 16 December 1972; 53 years ago
- System: Unitary parliamentary constitutional republic

Government structure
- Branches: Three (executive, legislature and judiciary)
- Head of state: President of Bangladesh
- Chambers: One
- Executive: Prime Minister and cabinet responsible to the Jatiya Sangsad
- Judiciary: Supreme Court, high courts and district courts
- Federalism: No
- Electoral college: No

History
- Amendments: 17
- Last amended: 8 July 2018
- Location: Dhaka, Bangladesh
- Authors: Dr Kamal Hossain; Chairman of the Constitution Drafting Committee and other members of Constituent Assembly
- Signatories: 404 members of the Constituent Assembly of Bangladesh
- Supersedes: Proclamation of Bangladeshi Independence

Full text
- Constitution of the People's Republic of Bangladesh at Wikisource

The Constitution of Bangladesh, (Note: Bengali: বাংলাদেশের সংবিধান, romanized: Baṅladeśer Śoṅbidhan, pronounced [ˈbaŋladeʃeɾ ˈʃɔŋbidʱan]) officially the Constitution of the People's Republic of Bangladesh, (Note: Bengali: গণপ্রজাতন্ত্রী বাংলাদেশের সংবিধান, romanized: Gôṇôprôjatôntri Baṅladeśer Śoṅbidhan) is the supreme law of Bangladesh. The constitution was adopted by the Constituent Assembly of Bangladesh on 4 November 1972, it came into effect on 16 December 1972. The constituent assembly was composed of officials elected in the national and provincial council elections of Pakistan held in 1970. The denial of this electoral body resulted in the Bangladesh Liberation War. The Constitution establishes Bangladesh as a unitary parliamentary republic. Directly borrowing from the four tenets of Mujibism, the political ideas of Sheikh Mujibur Rahman, the constitution states nationalism, socialism, democracy and secularism as its four fundamental principles.

While the Constitution nominally declares the protection of fundamental rights and an independent judiciary, it has been often criticized for fostering autocracy and failing to safeguard human rights. The Fundamental Principles of State Policy in Part II are often described as empty rhetoric due to their unjusticiability, while Fundamental Rights in Part III are constrained by extensive, imposable restrictions. Loopholes in the guise of poorly defined 'restrictions' in rights provisions have enabled the continued enforcement of the repressive sections of British colonial laws such as the Penal Code of 1860 and the Code of Criminal Procedure of 1898, and facilitated the enactment of later repressive laws such as the Special Powers Act of 1974, and the Cyber Security Act of 2023.

Part IV vests the executive power of the government in the prime minister-led Cabinet, which is accountable to Parliament. This structure seems democratic but, in practice, results in a concentration of authority in the hands of the prime minister due to the dominant position within the Cabinet and the control over MPs through party discipline and party-loyalty enforcing provision Article 70. Part IV further solidifies the prime minister's control by granting them authority over Cabinet affairs, overshadowing other ministers and centralizing executive decisions.

The Constitution has undergone 17 amendments, reflecting its susceptibility to political pressures over its pledge to ensure justice, equality, and liberty. Considering the unlimited powers granted to the prime minister and the people's limited civil rights, Badruddin Umar has famously termed it "A Constitution for Perpetual Emergency."

The interim government of Bangladesh, led by Muhammad Yunus, established the Constitutional Reform Commission and National Consensus Commission in 2024 with the aim of reforming or drafting and adopting a new inclusive democratic constitution through an elected constituent assembly. The commission was formed in the aftermath of a constitutional crisis that arose following the resignation of Sheikh Hasina on 5 August 2024, during the July Uprising.

== Modern constitutional history ==
=== British India ===
The advent of British rule in the 18th century displaced the centuries of governance developed by South Asian empires. The Regulating Act 1773 passed by the Parliament of the United Kingdom was the first basic law in the Bengal Presidency. The British Empire did not grant universal suffrage and democratic institutions to its colonies. The British slowly granted concessions for home rule. The Government of India Act 1858, Indian Councils Act 1861, Indian Councils Act 1892 and Indian Councils Act 1909 were later important laws of government. The legislatures of British India included the Bengal Legislative Council and the Eastern Bengal and Assam Legislative Council in the early 20th century. The Nehru Report recommended for universal suffrage, a bicameral legislature, a senate and a house of representatives. The Fourteen Points of Jinnah demanded provincial autonomy and quotas for Muslims in government. The Government of India Act 1935 established provincial parliaments based on separate electorates.

The 1940 Lahore Resolution, supported by the first Prime Minister of Bengal, asked the British government that "the North Western and Eastern Zones of (British) India should be grouped to constitute 'independent states'". It further proclaimed "that adequate, effective and mandatory safeguards should be specifically provided in the Constitution for minorities in these units and in the regions for the protection of their religious, cultural, economic, political, administrative and other rights". The resolution's status is akin to the magna carta in Pakistan, in terms of the concept of independence. On 20 June 1947, the Bengal Legislative Assembly voted on the partition of Bengal. It was decided by 126 votes to 90 that, if Bengal remained united, it should join the Constituent Assembly of Pakistan. At a separate meeting of legislators from West Bengal, it was decided by 58 votes to 21 that the province should be partitioned and that West Bengal should join the Constituent Assembly of India. At another separate meeting of legislators from East Bengal, it was decided by 106 votes to 35 that Bengal should not be partitioned and 107 votes to 34 that East Bengal should join the Constituent Assembly of Pakistan if Bengal was partitioned. On 6 July 1947, the Sylhet referendum voted to partition Sylhet Division from Assam Province and merge it into East Bengal. On 11 August 1947, Muhammad Ali Jinnah, the president of the Constituent Assembly of Pakistan, declared that religious minorities would enjoy full freedom of religion in the emergent new state.

=== Union with Pakistan ===
Section 8 of the Indian Independence Act 1947 provided that the Government of India Act, 1935 with certain amendments and adaptations would be the working Constitution of the Dominion of Pakistan during the transitional period. The Constituent Assembly of Pakistan included 79 members, of whom 44 were from East Bengal, 22 from West Punjab, 5 from Sind, 3 from the North West Frontier Province, 1 from Baluchistan and 4 from the acceding princely states. The Bengali language movement and demands for replacing separate electorates with joint universal suffrage were key issues in East Bengal. The first constituent assembly was arbitrarily dissolved by the Governor General in 1954. This led to the court challenge of Federation of Pakistan v. Maulvi Tamizuddin Khan, in which the federal court supported the Governor General's decision, although Justice A. R. Cornelius expressed dissent. The dissolution of the assembly was one of the first major blows to democracy in Pakistan.

The Constitution of Pakistan of 1956 was adopted by a second constituent assembly elected in 1955. It declared two provinces- East Pakistan and West Pakistan; and two federal languages- Urdu and Bengali. The first Pakistani Constitution was in place for only a few years. General Ayub Khan staged a military coup and introduced the Constitution of Pakistan of 1962. The 1962 Constitution introduced a presidential system in which electoral colleges would be responsible for electing the president and governors. The chief ministers' offices were abolished; and parliament and provincial assemblies were delegated to a mainly advisory role. The system was dubbed "Basic Democracy". In 1965, Fatima Jinnah's failed bid for the presidency prompted allegations of a rigged electoral system. The Six Points of Sheikh Mujibur Rahman demanded parliamentary democracy. Rahman's Six Points were part of the manifesto of the Awami League, the party which won first general election in East and West Pakistan in 1970. The Awami League ran on the platform of developing a new Pakistani Constitution based on the Six Points. The League won 167 out 169 East Pakistani seats in the National Assembly of Pakistan and 288 out of 300 seats in the East Pakistan Provincial Assembly. The Pakistani military junta refused to transfer power to Prime Minister-elect Sheikh Mujibur Rahman, and instead executed Operation Searchlight which triggered Bangladesh War of Independence.

=== Bangladesh ===
The Provisional Government of Bangladesh issued the Proclamation of Independence on 10 April 1971, which served as the interim first Constitution of Bangladesh. It declared "equality, human dignity and social justice" as the fundamental principles of the republic. East Pakistani members of Pakistan's federal and provincial assemblies were transformed into members of the Constituent Assembly of Bangladesh. The constituent assembly had 404 members. After the war, the Constitution Drafting Committee was formed in 1972. The committee included 34 members with Dr. Kamal Hossain as its chairman. The committee held meetings at various stages from 17 April to 3 October. Through a public notice, a total of 98 recommendations were received from interested individuals regarding the drafting of the constitution.

On 12 October, the then Law Minister Kamal Hossain presented the constitution bill in the Constituent Assembly. Its first reading began on 19 October and continued till 30 October. The second reading took place from 31 October to 3 November. Manabendra Narayan Larma made an impassioned appeal to declare the term of citizenship as "Bangladeshi" instead of "Bengali". Larma argued that labeling all citizens as Bengali discriminated against non-Bengali communities, including his own Chakma ethnic group.

The third reading began on 4 November and it approved 65 amendments to the Constitution Bill and adopted and enacted the Constitution on 4 November. The Constitution came into effect on 16 December 1972. A Westminster style political system was established. It declared nationalism, socialism, democracy and secularism as the fundamental principles of the republic. It proclaimed fundamental human rights, including freedom of speech, freedom of religion, freedom of movement, freedom of assembly, the right to education and public healthcare among others. A two thirds vote of parliament was required to amend the Constitution.

After winning the 1973 general election, the Awami League government often flouted Constitutional rules and principles. The government received strong criticism from the Bangladeshi press, including both Bengali and English newspapers. The Committee for Civil Liberties and Legal Aid was formed to defend the Constitution. The Awami League enacted three Constitutional amendments between 1973 and 1975. The most drastic amendment was in January 1975. It introduced a one party state and a presidential government, while the judiciary's independence was greatly curtailed.

Constitutional rule was suspended on 15 August 1975 with the assassination of President Sheikh Mujibur Rahman and the declaration of martial law. The Chief Martial Law Administrator issued a series of Proclamation Orders between 1975 and 1979 which amended the Constitution. Lieutenant General Ziaur Rahman is credited for many of these Proclamation Orders. The most significant of these orders was defining citizenship as Bangladeshi; other orders included the insertion of religious references and the controversial Indemnity Ordinance. In 1979, martial law was lifted, multiparty politics was restored and Constitutional rule was revived. The Fifth Amendment in 1979 validated all Proclamation Orders of the martial law authorities. An executive presidency continued until 1982.

Martial law was again imposed in the 1982 Bangladesh coup d'état. When Constitutional rule was restored in 1986, the Sixth Amendment validated previous Proclamation Orders issued by the Chief Martial Law Administrator. The Eighth Amendment in 1988 declared Islam as the state religion and initiated limited devolution of the judiciary.

In 1990, a pro-democracy uprising ousted President Ershad. The uprising was followed by parliamentary elections in 1991. The Twelfth Amendment passed by the fifth parliament is the most influential Constitutional amendment in Bangladesh. It re-established parliamentary government. It amended Articles 48, 55, 56, 57, 58, 59, 60, 70, 72, 109, 119, 124, 141A and 142. The Prime Minister became the executive head of government, and along with the cabinet, was responsible to parliament. Local government was made more democratic. However, the amendment restricted the voting freedom of MPs. According to Article 70, MPs would lose their seat if they voted against their party. This made it impossible for parliament to have a free vote, including no-confidence motions to remove a prime minister. Experts have described the amendment as instituting prime ministerial dictatorship. The Thirteen Amendment in 1996 introduced the Caretaker government of Bangladesh.

In 2010, the Supreme Court of Bangladesh ruled that the Fifth Amendment of 1979 went against the Constitutional spirit of the country and hence invalidated its removal of clauses related to secularism. The Supreme Court gave the verdict in the case of Bangladesh Italian Marble Works Ltd. v. Government of Bangladesh. While implementing the supreme court's verdict in the Fifteenth Amendment in 2011, the Awami League-led parliament abolished the caretaker government system, which the party itself had advocated in 1996.

In 2017, the Supreme Court declared the Sixteenth Amendment Act of 2014 illegal and void. The amendment had introduced the provision of impeaching judges in parliament. The Supreme Court held that since parliament cannot hold conscience votes due to Article 70, the provision would have undermined judicial independence.

== Contents ==
=== Preamble ===
BISMILLAH-AR-RAHMAN-AR-RAHIM
In the name of Allah, the Beneficient, the Merciful
In the name of the Creator, the Merciful. (Note: This religious text was not included in the original handwritten constitution)

We, the people of Bangladesh, having proclaimed our independence on the 26th day of March 1971 and through a historic struggle for national liberation, established the independent, sovereign People's Republic of Bangladesh;

Pledging that the high ideals of nationalism, socialism, democracy and secularism, which inspired our heroic people to dedicate themselves to, and our brave martyrs to sacrifice their lives in, the national liberation struggle, shall be the fundamental principles of the Constitution;

Further pledging that it shall be a fundamental aim of the State to realise through the democratic process a socialist society, free from exploitation a society in which the rule of law, fundamental human rights and freedom, equality and justice, political, economic and social, will be secured for all citizens;

Affirming that it is our sacred duty to safeguard, protect and defend this Constitution and to maintain its supremacy as the embodiment of the will of the people of Bangladesh so that we may prosper in freedom and may make our full contribution towards international peace and co operation in keeping with the progressive aspirations of mankind;

In our Constituent Assembly, this eighteenth day of Kartick, 1379 B.S., corresponding to the fourth day of November 1972 A.D., do hereby adopt, enact and give to ourselves this Constitution.

=== The Constitution ===
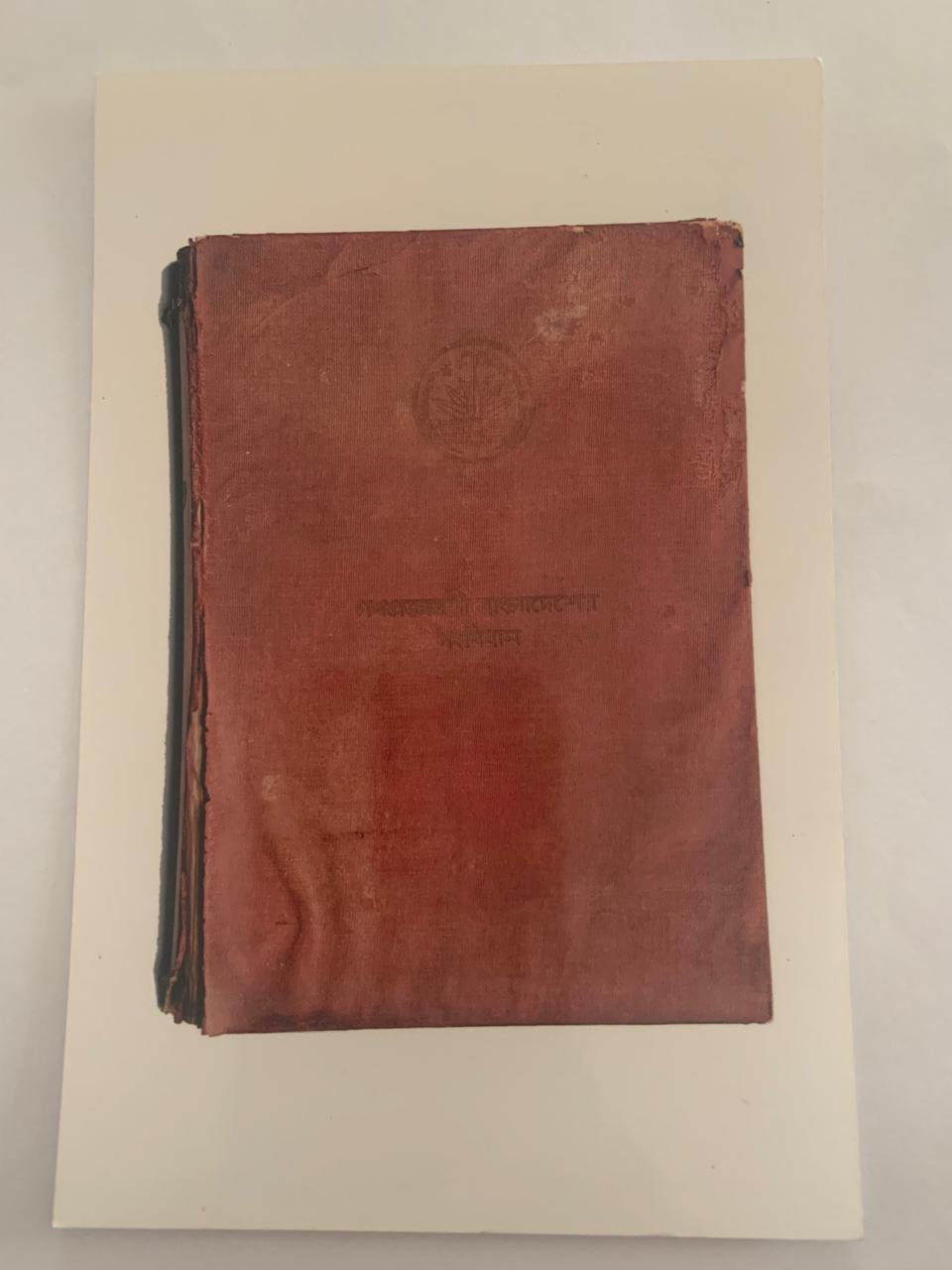
The original leather front page of the constitution of Bangladesh

=== Part I: The Republic ===
States that Bangladesh is a unitary republic. Demarcates the territory of the Republic. Proclaims that Islam is the state religion after the fifth amendment, but guarantees equal status and equal rights to all religions. Declares Bangla as the state language. Specifies the national anthem, national flag, and national emblem of the Republic. Declares Dhaka as the national capital. Provides eligibility for citizenship. States that all powers are derived from the people, and the exercise of such powers will be by the authority of the Constitution. Proclaims that the Constitution is the supreme law of Bangladesh, and that any laws inconsistent with the Constitution are void and of no effect. Article 7A prohibits the suspension or abrogation of the Constitution. States that certain parts of the Constitution are unamendable.

=== Part II: Fundamental Principles of State Policy ===
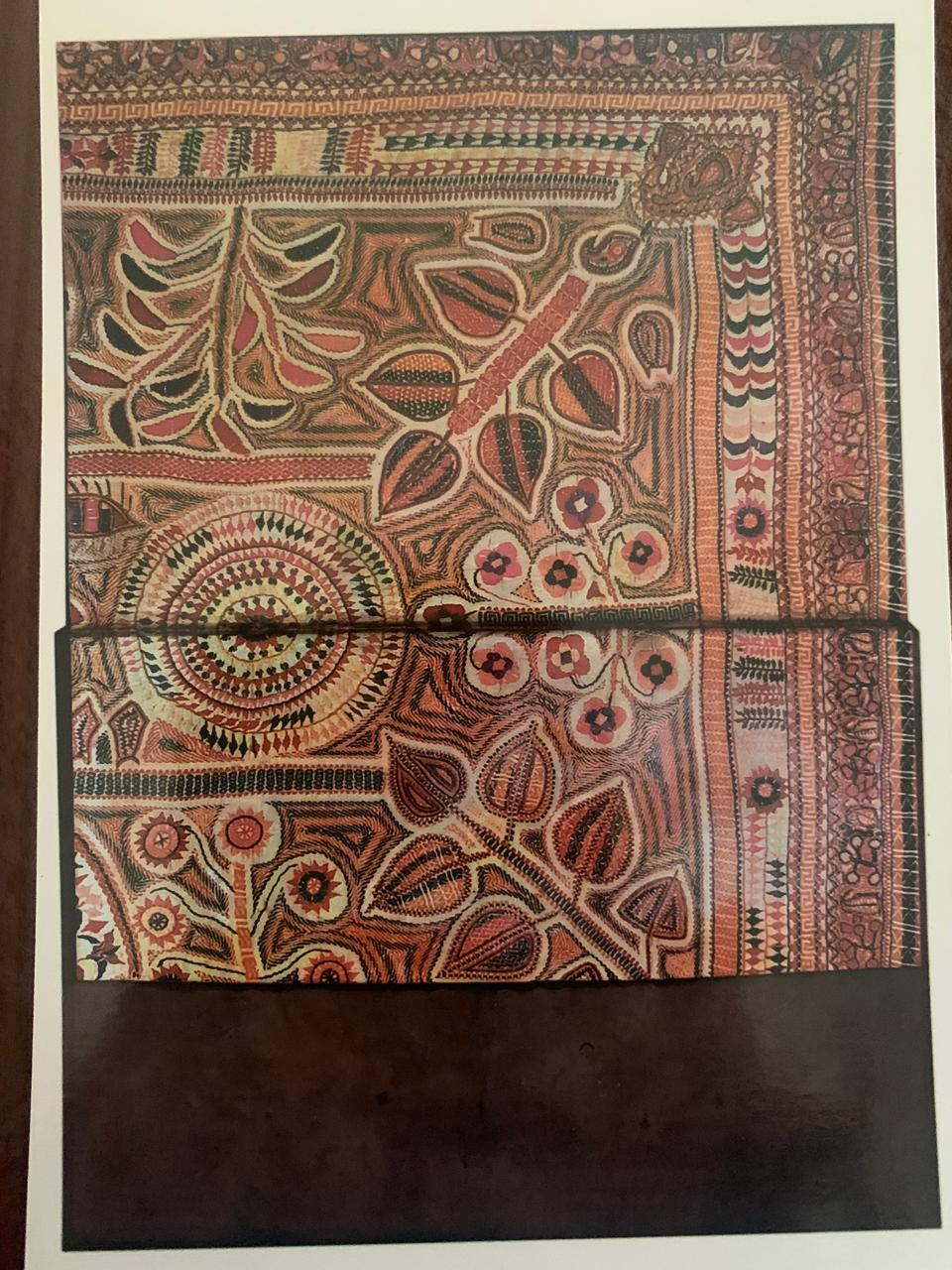
Cover of the constitution known as "Pustani" designed in Nakshi Kantha of the original handwritten constitution of Bangladesh

States that nationalism, socialism, democracy and secularism are the fundamental principles of state policy. Pledges to ensure the emancipation of peasants and workers. States that education will be free and compulsory. Endeavours to protect and improve the environment. States that the Republic will ensure equality of opportunity to all citizens. States that endeavours will be made to ensure the equality of opportunity and participation of women in all spheres of life. Declares the separation of powers between the judiciary and the executive. States that measures will be adopted to conserve cultural traditions and the heritage of the people. Ensures the protection of national monuments. States that the Republic will promote international peace and to support oppressed people throughout the world.

=== Part III: Fundamental Rights ===
Declares that all laws inconsistent with the fundamental rights of the Constitution are to be void. Enshrines the principle of equality before the law. Prohibits discrimination on the basis of religion, race, caste, sex or place of birth. States that there will be equality of opportunity for people who seek public employment. Prohibits citizens of the Republic from receiving foreign titles, honours, awards or decorations without prior approval by the President. Declares that the protection of the law is the inalienable right of all citizens. Proclaims that no person shall be deprived of life and personal liberty. Provides safeguards for those in detention. Prohibits the use of forced labour. Provides protections for persons in respect of trial and punishment. Enshrines freedom of movement; freedom of assembly; freedom of association; freedom of thought, conscience and speech; freedom of profession or occupation; and freedom of religion. States that all citizens have the right to acquire property. States that all citizens have the right to protect their homes and means of communication. Declares that the Supreme Court will enforce the fundamental rights of the Constitution. Reserves the right to provide indemnity to individuals.

=== Part IV: The Executive ===
==== Chapter I: The President ====
Declares that Bangladesh will have a President who will serve as Head of State of the Republic. States that the President will be elected by members of the Jatiya Sangsad. Prescribes that the President will only act in accordance with the advice of the Prime Minister, with the exception of the appointment of the Prime Minister and the Chief Justice. Specifies that the President must have attained the age of 35 years, and must be qualified for election as a member of parliament. States that the President has the power to grant pardons and to commute or suspend the sentences of individuals convicted in a court. Specifies that the President is limited to serving two 5-year terms in office, regardless of whether they are consecutive or not. Outlines that in order to tender their resignation, the President must write under their hand addressed to the Speaker. Outlines the process of impeachment and removal from office of the President. Specifies the process of removal from office of the President on grounds of physical or mental incapacity. States that the Speaker will discharge the duties of President in the event of the President's absence.

==== Chapter II: The Prime Minister and The Cabinet ====
States that the Republic is to have a Cabinet with the Prime Minister as its Head. Prescribes that the executive power of the Republic is to be exercised by or on the authority of the Prime Minister. States that appointments to the Cabinet will be determined by the Prime Minister and made by the President. Specifies that not less than nine-tenths of members of the Cabinet must be Members of Parliament. States that the President will appoint as Prime Minister the member of parliament who appears to command the confidence of the Jatiya Sangsad. States that the office of Prime Minister will become vacant in the event they: tender their resignation to the President; cease to be a member of parliament or cease to retain the confidence of the majority of members of the Jatiya Sangsad. There are no term limits specified for the Prime Minister. Specifies the tenure of office of other Ministers.

==== Chapter III: Local Government ====
Makes provision for democratically elected local government in every administrative unit in the Republic. States that powers exercised by local government will be delegated by Parliament.

==== Chapter IV: The Defence Services ====
Declares that the President is the Commander-in-chief of the Bangladesh Armed Forces. States that the exercise of such powers will be determined by law. States that Parliament will by law provide for the regulation of the defence services, including the maintenance of the defence services; the grating of commissions; the appointment of chiefs of staff of the defence services and the discipline and other matters relating to the defence services. Reserves the right to declare war for Parliament.

==== Chapter V: The Attorney General ====
States that the President will appoint someone who is qualified to serve as a Justice of the Supreme Court as Attorney General. States that in exercise of their duties, the Attorney General is entitled to attend the proceedings of any courts in the Republic.

=== Part V: The Legislature ===
==== Chapter I: Parliament ====
Proclaims that there will be a Parliament for Bangladesh known as the House of the Nation, which will be vested with the legislative powers of the Republic. States that Parliament will consist of 300 directly elected members, while 50 seats will be reserved exclusively for women and will be allocated on a proportional basis. Specifies that a person is required to be a citizen of Bangladesh who has attained the age of 25 years in order to qualify for election to Parliament. Also specifies the procedure to disqualify an individual from election to Parliament. Outlines the procedure for a member of parliament to vacate their seat. States that a member of parliament who is absent from Parliament for 90 consecutive days will of vacated their seat. States that Members of Parliament are entitled to remuneration. Prescribes a penalty for Members of Parliament who take their seats or vote before reciting the oath of office. States that a member of parliament who resigns from their party or votes against their party in Parliament will vacate their seat. Allows candidates to stand for election in multiple constituencies, but in the event a single candidate is elected to more than one, they are required to vacate all but one seat. Specifies that Parliament will be summoned, prorogued and dissolved by the President. States that Parliament will sit for a five-year term. Decrees that at the commencement of the first session of Parliament after a general election and the commencement of the first session of Parliament every year, the President is to make an address to Parliament. States that Ministers are entitled to address and take part in the proceedings of Parliament, but only Minister who are Members of Parliament are entitled to vote. States that Parliament will, in its first sitting after a general election, elect a Speaker and Deputy Speaker among its members. States that the individual presiding over proceedings is not entitled to vote unless there is an equality of votes. Specifies that the quorum of the Parliament will be 60 members. States that Parliament will appoint among its members a number of standing committees. Makes provision for the establishment of the office of the Ombudsman. States that Members of Parliament are protected by parliamentary privilege. Prescribes that Parliament will have its own secretariat.

==== Chapter II: Legislative and Financial Procedures ====
Outlines the legislative procedure for a Bill to become an act of parliament. States that assent is required from the President in order for a Bill to become an Act of Parliament. Specifies that if the President fails to assent to a Bill within fifteen days of it being presented to them, it will be deemed that they have assented to the bill and it will become law. Outlines the legislative procedure for Money Bills. States that Money Bills can only be introduced with the recommendation of the President. States that taxes can only be levied or collected under the authority of an Act of Parliament. States that taxes can only be levied and collected under the authority of an Act of Parliament. States that all revenue received by the Government from the repayment of loans will form part of a single fund known as the Consolidated Fund. States that all other public revenue will be credited to the Public Account of the Republic. States that the custody of public money and their payment into and the withdrawal from the Consolidated Fund will be regulated by an Act of Parliament. Outlines the revenue payable to the Public Account of the Republic. States that an Annual Financial Statement must be laid before Parliament for each respective financial year. Specifies the charges of the Consolidated Fund. Outlines the procedure relating to the Annual Financial Statement. Makes provision for an Appropriations Act to be defrayed from the Consolidated Fund. Makes provision for the use of supplementary and excess grants, in the event the total amount authorised to spend in a fiscal year is not sufficient. Specifies the powers of Parliament in relation to the Consolidated Fund.

==== Chapter III: Ordinance Making Power ====
States that in the event that the Jatiya Sangsad is dissolved, and immediate action is necessary, the President may make or promulgate Ordinances.

=== Part VI: The Judiciary ===
==== Chapter I: The Supreme Court ====
Declares that there is to be a Supreme Court, consisting of an Appellate Division and a High Court Division. States that there is to be a Chief Justice and other Judges who are to be appointed by the President. Decrees that the Chief Justice and the other Judges will be independent in the exercise of their judicial functions. Outlines the procedure for the appointment of the Chief Justice and other Judges. States that a Judge must be a citizen of Bangladesh who has either been an Advocate at the Supreme Court for a minimum of ten years, or has held judicial office in Bangladesh for ten years. States that a Judge is entitled to serve until they have attained the age of sixty-seven years. States that the President can, pursuant to a resolution passed by not less than two-thirds of Members of Parliament, remove Judges. Makes provision for the temporary appointment of the Chief Justice. States that the President may appoint one or more duly qualified persons to serve as an Additional Judge for a period not exceeding two years. States that after their retirement or removal, a Judge is prohibited from holding an office of profit in service of the Republic. States that the seat of the Supreme Court will be the national capital, Dhaka. Specifies the jurisdiction of the High Court Division. Grants the High Court Division the authority to issue certain orders and directions. Specifies the jurisdiction of the Appellate Division. Grants the Appellate Division the power to issue directions, orders, decrees or writs. States that the Appellate Division will have the power to review any judgments or orders issued by it. States that in the event that the President believes a question of law has arisen that is of public importance, the Supreme Court may report its opinion to the President. States that the Supreme Court has the power to make rules which regulate the practise and procedure of each Division of the Supreme Court and any other subordinate court. States that the Supreme Court will be a court of record. States that the Supreme Court will have superintendence over all courts and tribunals subordinate to it. Outlines the procedure for the transfer of cases from subordinate courts to the High Court Division. States that the law declared by the Appellate Division and the High Court Division will be legally-binding and will be binding in all subordinate courts in the Republic. States that all authorities, executive and judicial, in the Republic will act in aid of the Supreme Court. Specifies the appointment procedure of the staff of the Supreme Court.

==== Chapter II: Subordinate Courts ====
Makes provision for the establishment of subordinate courts in the Republic. Outlines that the appointment of persons to offices in the judicial service or as magistrates exercising judicial functions will be made by the President. States that the control and discipline of subordinate courts will be vested in the President and will be exercised in consultation with the Supreme Court. States that all persons employed in the judicial service and all magistrates shall be independent in the exercise of their judicial functions.

==== Chapter III: Administrative Tribunals ====
States that Parliament shall have the power to establish one or more administrative tribunals.

=== Part VII: Elections ===
Makes provision for the establishment of a Bangladesh Election Commission, chaired by the Chief Election Commissioner. Prescribes the functions of the Election Commission. Outlines the procedure for the appointment of staff to the election commission. States that there is to be a single electoral roll for each constituency. Specifies that in order to qualify for registration as a voter, an individual is required to be a citizen of Bangladesh who has attained the age of 18 years. Outlines the timetable for conducting general elections. States that Parliament may from time to time pass laws that regulate the delimitation of constituencies, the preparation of electoral rolls, or the holding of elections. Prohibits courts in the Republic from questioning the validity of electoral law or elections. States that it is the duty of all executive authorities in the Republic to assist the Election Commission in the discharge of its functions.

=== Part VIII: The Comptroller and Auditor General ===
Makes provision for the establishment of a Comptroller and Auditor General of Bangladesh. Prescribes the functions and duties of the Auditor-General. Outlines the term of office for the Auditor-General. Specifies the procedure for the appointment of an Acting Auditor-General. States that the Public Accounts of the Republic will be kept in a manner prescribed by the Auditor-General. States that the reports of the Auditor-General are to be laid before Parliament.

=== Part IX: The Services of Bangladesh ===
==== Chapter I: Services ====
States that Parliament may by law regulate the appointment of persons employed by the Republic. Specifies the tenure in office for persons employed by the Republic. Outlines the procedure for the dismissal of persons from service to the Republic. Makes provision for the reorganisation of the services of the Republic

  - Chapter II: Public Service Commission
- Part X: Amendment of the Constitution
- Part XI: Miscellaneous

== Artistic Work ==
The committee of the artistic decoration work for the constitution was presided by Jainul Abedin. This committee also included Hashem Khan, Jonabul Islam, Abul Barak Alvi and Shamarjit Ray Chowdhury. The original handwritten document has a leather cover. The first page after the cover known as "Pustani" includes a design of Nakshi Kantha. The constitution also has the official monogram Shapla. Each of the pages includes handwriting of artist AKM Abdur Rouf and illustrations by the 5 artists led by Jainul Abedin. The original copy was handed to Sheikh Mujibur Rahman on 13 December 1972. As of 2022, the original copy of the constitution is stored at the Bangladesh National Museum and a replica is available for public view.

== Freedom of religion ==
Freedom of religion is one of the cornerstones of Bangladesh's Constitution. Article 12 calls for secularity, the elimination of interfaith tensions and prohibits the abuse of religion for political purposes and any discrimination against, or persecution of, persons practicing a particular religion. Article 41 subjects religious freedom to public order, law and morality; it gives every citizen the right to profess, practice or propagate any religion; every religious community or denomination the right to establish, maintain and manage its religious institutions; and states that no person attending any educational institution shall be required to receive religious instruction, or to take part in or to attend any religious ceremony or worship, if that instruction, ceremony or worship relates to a religion other than his own. Governments have generally supported and respected religious freedom.

== International agreements ==
As of 2017, Bangladesh is a state party to the following international treaties concerning human rights. Bangladesh can in theory be held liable for its performance in the fields of these treaties.

- International Covenant on Civil and Political Rights
- International Covenant on Economic, Social and Cultural Rights
- Convention against Torture and Other Cruel, Inhuman or Degrading Treatment or Punishment
- International Convention on the Elimination of All Forms of Racial Discrimination
- Convention on the Prevention and Punishment of the Crime of Genocide
- Rome Statute of the International Criminal Court
- Convention on the Rights of the Child
- Convention on Consent to Marriage, Minimum Age for Marriage and Registration of Marriages
- Convention on the Rights of Persons with Disabilities
- Convention on the Elimination of All Forms of Discrimination against Women
- Convention on the Political Rights of Women
- International Convention for the Protection of All Persons from Enforced Disappearance

Among the notable agreements Bangladesh is not a state party to include the following.

- Convention relating to the Status of Refugees
- Convention relating to the Status of Stateless Persons
- Convention on the Reduction of Statelessness
- Indigenous and Tribal Peoples Convention
- Second Optional Protocol to the International Covenant on Civil and Political Rights on abolishing the death penalty

== Judicial precedent ==
Article 111 of the Constitution proclaims the doctrine of binding judicial precedent. According to the article, the law declared by the Supreme Court of Bangladesh, including its Appellate Division and the High Court Division, are binding in all subordinate courts. Article 111 makes Bangladesh an integral part of the common law world. Judicial review is also supported by the Constitution

== Judicial review ==
The Constitution does not specifically mention the term judicial review, but Article 102 allows writ petitions to be filed at the High Court Division for reviewing laws, the actions and policies of authorities and lower court proceedings. Articles 7(2), 26, 44(1) & 102 are considered to indirectly support the system of judicial review. Therefore, unlike the US Constitution, there is no countermajoritarian difficulty in the Constitution of Bangladesh.

== Criticism of the Constitution of Bangladesh ==
The Constitution of Bangladesh, since its adoption in 1972, has repeatedly come under criticism for its failure to build institutionalism in governance and politics, safeguard human rights, and ensure the independence of the judiciary and the legislature from the executive. Many denounced the Constitution for facilitating authoritarian tendencies and labelled it as a "fascist constitution."

== Constitutional reform ==
Dr. Kamal Hossain, who is described as the "Father of the Bangladeshi Constitution", has been an ardent supporter of reforming the document to reflect the values of the 21st century. Hossain has blamed amendments during military rule for eroding the Constitution's principles. Justice Muhammad Habibur Rahman, a former Chief Justice and Chief Adviser to the caretaker government, proposed that a Constitution Commission be formed to explore the prospects for Constitutional reform.

A. T. M. Shamsul Huda, former Chief Election Commissioner, has called for a Constitutional amendment to ensure "checks and balances" and the separation of powers.

Following the July Uprising in Bangladesh, a fresh debate has arisen over constitutional reform. Professor Ali Riaz, who leads the Constitutional Reform Commission, and Rifat Hasan, have both advocated for creating a new constitution. Riaz asserts that rewriting the constitution is vital to restoring democratic institutions, even if it necessitates forming a Constitutional Assembly. Rifat Hasan contends that the current constitution has lost its ethical authority to its citizens, particularly in the context of the July Uprising, making it necessary to adopt a new one. He has suggested forming an all-party Guardian Council to ensure broad participation in the drafting and adopting process. This council would draft the constitution and, after approval, present it for adoption via a referendum. However, senior lawyer Z. I. Khan Panna has voiced opposition to the idea, warning that abolishing the constitution now could lead to future repeals within the next decade or two.

== Amendments ==
As of 2023, the Constitution of the People's Republic of Bangladesh has been amended 17 times.

== Comparisons with other constitutions ==
Government	Influence
United Kingdom	Parliamentary government; Concept of single citizenship; Rule of law; The legislative speaker and their role; Legislative procedure
United States	Independent judiciary and separation of powers; Judicial review; President as commander-in-chief of the armed forces; Equal protection under law; Power to declare war reserved for the legislature
(Republic of Ireland) Ireland	Directive principles of state policy
Australia	Preamble terminology
France	Concepts of liberté, égalité, fraternité
Soviet Union	Fundamental Duties under article 20
Japan	Due process

Bangladesh has a single codified document as its Constitution, as in the United States, India, Brazil, Pakistan, Germany and France. It is not an unwritten constitution or a set of Constitutional statutes, as in the United Kingdom, Israel, Canada, New Zealand, Saudi Arabia and Sweden.

== See also ==
- List of national constitutions
- 2024 Bangladesh constitutional crisis
- July Charter
