= Rifat Hasan =

Bangladeshi writer and poet

- রিফাত হাসান
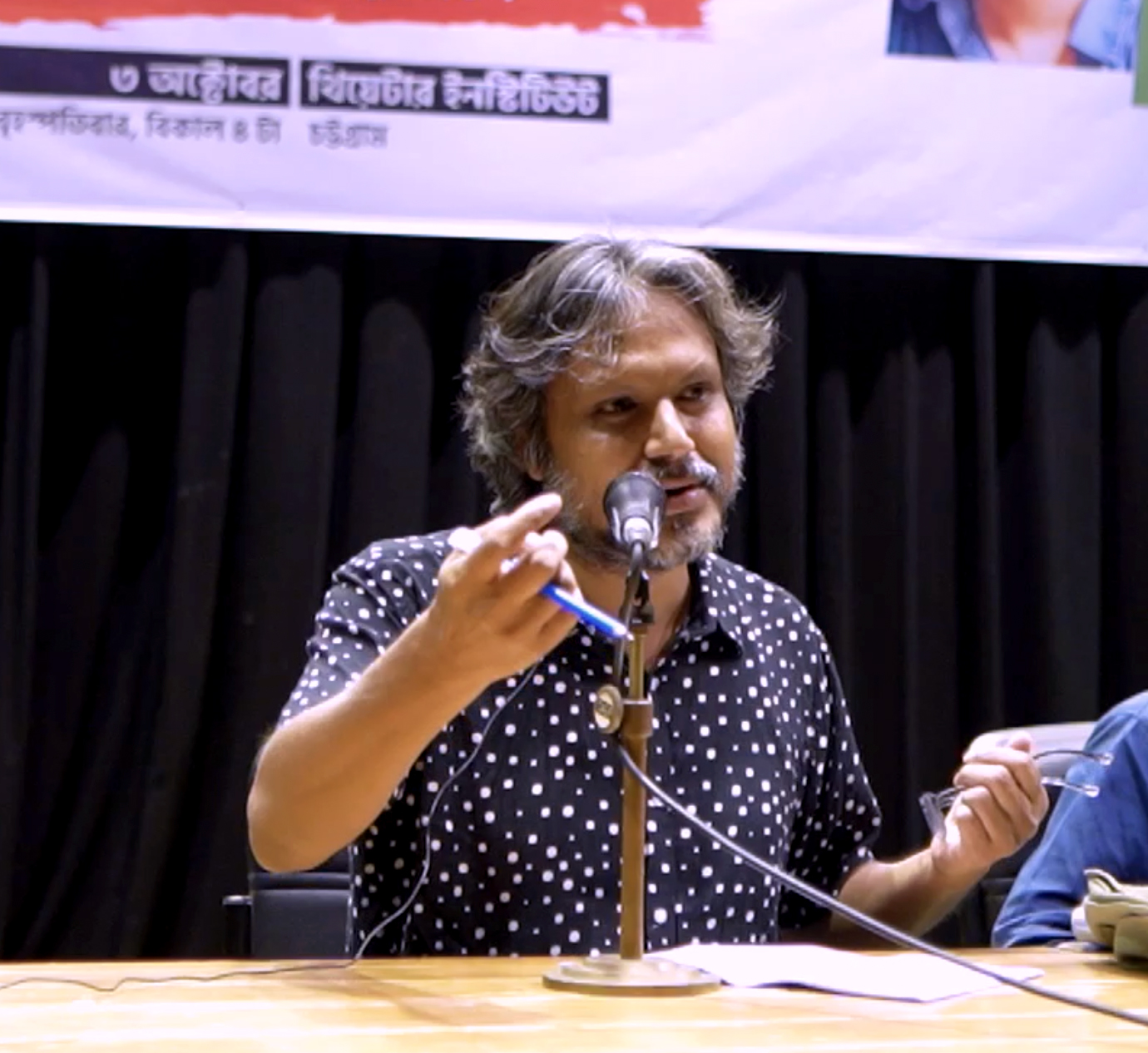
- Hasan in 2024
- Born: January 17, 1980; Chattogram
- Occupations: Writer; Poet
- Writing career
- Language: Bengali; English
- Genres: Non-fiction, Poetry
- Notable works: Shomporko, Bondhutto O Rajniti
- Website: rifathasan.com

Rifat Hasan (Bengali: রিফাত হাসান; born 17 January 1980) is a Bangladeshi writer and poet.

He is the author of Shomporko, Bondhutto O Rajniti, a nonfiction book published in 2014 that sparked both debate and criticism for its ideas on friendship, critique of modern politics, and its exploration of the complexities of political practices in post-independence Bangladesh. His books, op-eds, public lectures, and interviews have influenced young writers and thinkers in Bangladesh.

== Biography ==
In 2013, Hasan was one of the first few intellectuals to denounce the massive Shahbag demonstrations, termed the movement as fascist in nature and inimical to the idea of justice. In a March 2014 interview, he further condemned Shahbag protesters for restricting liberal discourse in society and failing to critically assess the war crimes tribunal under Sheikh Hasina's regime, which, to Hasan, created a point of no return in Bangladeshi politics and society.

After Fascist manifesto

Following the 2024 Student–People's uprising in Bangladesh, Rifat Hasan's proposal for post-fascist restructuring and constitutional reform gained prominence. In his After Fascist manifesto, Hasan argues that the current constitution has lost its ethical authority, especially after the July massacre, and calls for a new constitution to restore public ownership of the country. He proposes forming an all-party Guardian Council to oversee the drafting process, with a constitutional reform commission preparing a draft to be adopted through a referendum.

In a December 2024 public talk, Hasan emphasized the value of public dialogue over intellectual discussions. He proposed a referendum, if necessary, to address the debate on whether fascists have the right to engage in politics, including participation in elections, and on adopting a new constitution for the post-fascist era. To him, decisions on such matters cannot be left to vested BNP and Jamaat leaders, as the true stakeholders are the common people. Without the consent of the masses, no commission has the legitimacy to endorse the rehabilitation of fascists.

The 'July Charter'

Hasan was an early advocate for the idea of a 'revolutionary manifesto', a proposed political declaration based on consensus among political parties, civil society, and citizens of Bangladesh following the July Revolution of 2024. This concept was subsequently adopted by the interim government and is now known as the 'July Charter', which is currently being finalized for adoption under the supervision of the National Consensus Commission.

Hasan proposed that, the charter should announce Bangladesh's exit from the fascist-imposed pseudo religious war, a conflict he attributed to a fascist framework. He further suggested the charter must commit to eliminating ethnic and communal discrimination in society, rejecting all forms of hatred in politics, and acknowledging the July uprising as a national mandate for drafting a new constitution that would incorporate it.

The Mujibist 'Religious War' Framework

According to Hasan, Sheikh Mujibur Rahman imposed a persistent 'religious war' framework in post-independence Bangladesh. Hasan argued that, Mujib framed collaboration and opposition to the Liberation War in religious rather than political terms. This framework, Hasan explained, labeled one segment of society as 'supporters of independence' and another as its opponents, placing Bangladesh in what he described as a permanent state of 'religious war'.

Hasan contended that Mujibur Rahman missed the opportunity to take a decisive stance on whether to allow or ban political parties that had opposed Bangladesh's emergence and collaborated with the Pakistani army. Instead of banning those parties for their collaboration, Mujib, according to Hasan, chose to ban Islamic parties solely for pursuing religion-based politics. By identifying religion as the central threat, Mujib, according to Hasan, transformed the political questions of collaboration and opposition to the Liberation War into a permanent 'religious war', one that remains unresolved.

Shahbag Movement as an extension of 'Religious War'

Hasan further interpreted the 2013 Shahbagh movement as an extension of Mujibist pseudo-religious-war framework. He described it not primarily as a struggle over war crimes, as it was commonly portrayed, but as a tool to address and confront political Islam—an issue he believes Bangladesh has yet to move beyond. For Hasan, the July Charter must outline a method for overcoming this Mujibist framework while simultaneously addressing questions of collaboration, justice, and political reconciliation.

== Criticism ==
Several critics harshly condemned Rifat in 2013 for allegedly defending the views of Hefazat and accused war criminals. Progressive left activists claimed Rifat's stance on the Shahbagh movement was overly lenient toward Jamaat-e-Islami's position on the 1971 Liberation War and sympathetic to Hefazat, arguing that he was more critical of the Shahbagh uprising than of these groups. In 2024, Mixed reactions have emerged in response to Hasan's proposal for an all-party Guardian Council. Justice M.A. Matin, a retired judge of the Appellate Division of the Supreme Court of Bangladesh, and Ridwanul Hoque, a constitutional expert, see the Guardian Council as essential for reform process. However, they note that a constitution is more than a written document; under this same constitution, Bangladesh has at times experienced better governance than at others. Others, like Nayel Rahman, view Hasan's call to rewrite the constitution as a bold move for change in Bangladesh.

== Books ==
=== Prose ===
- Shomporko, Bondhutto O Rajniti (Relations, Friendship and Politics, 2014)
- Ei Shomoiti Apni Kibhabe Udjapon Korben (How to celebrate this fascist time, 2016)
- Text, Conspiracy O Rupkotha (Text, Conspiracy and FairyTale, 2021)
- Moddhoborti Benchtate (On the middle bench, 2025)

=== Interview ===
- Memories of Fascism: Collected Interviews of Rifat Hasan, 2025

=== Poetry ===
- Jolladkhanai Boisha KobitaPat (Reading poetry in a slaughterhouse, 2020)
