= Democracy in Bangladesh =

The four stars in the National Emblem of Bangladesh represent the four fundamental principles of the constitution: nationalism, socialism, democracy, and secularism. Like most other socialist countries, sheaves of paddy in the borders represent the agricultural workers as a symbol of socialism.

Democracy in Bangladesh is historically connected to the Westminster style of democracy of United Kingdom while Bangladesh was part of British Colonial Empire from 1700 to 1947. Since Bangladesh achieved its independence on 16 December 1971 from Pakistan, Bangladesh introduced parliamentary democracy into its political system; however, a military coup in 1975 halted the process. It was restored in 1991 through a constitutional amendment.

== History ==
Bangladesh achieved sovereignty from Pakistan on 16 December 1971, a country established with a democratic framework. After the partition of India, Bangladesh (then East Bengal) became a province of Pakistan. Early Pakistani Muslim League dominated politics failed to bring democracy in the country. After the East Bengali legislative election, 1954, Awami Muslim League, formed a democratic government in East Pakistan. In 1958, the government in East Pakistan was dismissed by the central government. Later, the 1958 Pakistani coup d'état; the Six point movement of 1966; and the 1970 Pakistani general election resulted in the rise of Bengali nationalism and pro-democracy movements in East Pakistan, which drove the country to armed liberation struggle in 1971. As a result, Bangladesh was established with democratic institutions at its core.

Bangladesh's first leaders came from the Awami League, a party which played a pivotal role in the campaign for a separate Bengali state. The Awami League party oversaw the implementation of a parliamentary system of democracy as stated in the Provisional Constitution of Order of 1972. Soon after, the 1972 constitution was passed by the Constituent Assembly on 4 November 1972.

Post-independent Bangladesh saw three political parties in power till now: Awami League, Bangladesh Nationalist Party and Jatiya Party. After the liberation, The Awami League first formed the government under the leadership of the country’s Father of the Nation Bangabandhu Sheikh Mujibur Rahman. First general election in the country was organized on 7 March 1973 as per the newly drafted constitution, where Awami League won a huge mandate. After the initial years of democracy, Bangabandhu regime initially moved towards socialism by establishing a one-party socialist state in 1975, which saw the first collapse of democracy in Bangladesh. Government initially restricted civil liberties and most of the newspapers were banned.

After the Assassination of Sheikh Mujibur Rahman on 15 August 1975, Bangladesh experienced two decades worth of authoritarian rules which included stints of military regimes. The country experienced military coups in 1975; however, multi-party democratic values was promoted again after it, but the military used corruption and bad ruling to justify the takeover and later on General Ziaur Rahman was elected as president in 1977. In 1982, martial law was announced again by General H.M. Ershad after a coup to overthrow the previous regime held by General Ziaur Rahman's successor, Abdus Sattar.

Student led civil disobedience and mass uprising in 1990, the formation of the Caretaker Government under leadership of the Justice Shahabuddin Ahmed, and holding the National Parliament election on 27 February 1991 introduced retrieval of democracy in Bangladesh.The Bangladesh Nationalist Party (BNP) won the election held in 1991 and formed the government under Prime Minister Khaleda Zia. Parliamentary system was reintroduced in the parliament on 6 August 1991 by the Constitution (Twelfth Amendment) Act, 1991 upon a public referendum. But huge rigging by-election in the parliamentary constituencies of Mirpur (1993) and Magura (1994) formed a dissension among the political parties, which created a suspicion among the oppositions at the national level that elections cannot be free and fair under the government of the ruling party. Resignation of 147 MPs of the opposition resulted a political uprising in the country, demanding of a non-party caretaker government by Awami League, Jatiya Party and Jamaat-e-Islami Bangladesh. The BNP government ignored the demand and doggedly held the general election on 15 February 1996, which was boycotted by most of the opposition parties and therefore the election lost international standards and legitimacy. In the four-days session of the 6th national parliament, bill for establishing the system of caretaker government was passed and included in the constitution as the thirteenth amendment and constitutional provision for general election under the non-party caretaker government was installed.

Seventh parliament election was held on 12 June 1996 under the caretaker government, where Awami League got majority and formed government under Prime Minister Sheikh Hasina. Following the eighth parliamentary election held on 1 October 2001, the four-party alliance, dominated by BNP and Jamaat, formed new government under Khaleda Zia again. But then government's extenuation of the retirement age limitations of the Chief Justice made impartiality of the subsequent Chief Advisor of the caretaker government and the chief election commissioner controversial among oppositions. Political conflict began with the alleged appointment of a Chief Advisor, a role which devolved to the President, Dr. Iajuddin Ahmed. The president declared state emergency resulting in 2006–2008 Bangladeshi political crisis, whereby, a military backed caretaker government was installed in an indirect army interference by the Army Chief of Staff General Moeen U Ahmed. Bangladesh Army overtook the political powers and formed a new caretaker government under the Chief Adviser Dr. Fakhruddin Ahmed. Ahmed government's initiation of reformation on the existing political parties, arresting both the party-heads of the two major political parties, establishing a special tribunal for their trial, was widely criticised for human rights abuses, censorship and violating speech freedom. After two years, Caretaker Government was compelled to declare time and schedule for the next general election. The ninth parliamentary election was held on 29 December 2008. The Grand Alliance, led by Awami League, formed the government under Sheikh Hasina.

== Democratic backsliding under Sheikh Hasina ==
But under the leadership of Sheikh Hasina since 2008, Bangladesh started to experience democratic backslide. In 2011, the ruling Awami League amended the constitution and abolished the caretaker government system. Government started a crackdown and purged political leaders. In 2013, Jamaat-e-Islami Bangladesh was banned. The tenth parliamentary election was held on 5 January 2014, but wasn’t free and fair. Almost all major opposition parties boycotted the elections and resulting in the incumbent Awami League-led Grand Alliance of Prime Minister Sheikh Hasina winning a landslide majority. The election was also criticized by foreign observers.

Eleventh parliamentary election was held on 30 December 2018 and was won by Awami League, yet this election was accused of vote rigging and unfairness. Bangladesh was ranked 26th most electoral democratic country in Asia according to V-Dem Democracy indices in 2023.

== Military and democracy ==
The political system of Bangladesh allowed the military to become increasingly involved in the political framework of the country. Since the re-emergence of parliamentary democracy in 1991, the existence of the two major political parties (Awami League and the Bangladesh National Party) - which held two polarising ideologies - allowed civilian unrest to grow as two ideologically different camps were established, causing a high polarisation of the country. The struggle between the Awami League and the Bangladesh National Party made civilians become partisan. Along with civilian polarisation, institutions were also affected by the animosity between the two political parties as civilian institutions were continually polarised and politicised; including the army. The army initially grew fearful of instating civilian control as people would often regard the army to be playing partisan politics. As a result, both the civilians and the armed forces were less interested in instituting a civilian democracy. This resulted in substantial amount of civilian unrest, such as that seen in 2007, and because of which soldiers were increasingly drawn to intervene in politics to supposedly safeguard Bangladesh's democracy.

During the post 2009 era, laws similar to the ones established in the democratic era of 1991 to 2006 had been instated which ensured more civilian control over the armed forces. A civilian elected prime minister became the head of state once again. Although former military officers remained in some political parties, the military did not possess any authority in the leadership of the parties as the parties became increasingly dynastic-ally operated. Civilian governments also tended to reduce the influence of the military in politics and took steps to allow more civilian institutional control of the military. However, in the political era after the 2009 era, it was seen that the military consistently favoured the ruling party in the government.

== Democratic values ==
Although Bangladesh has been under authoritarian regimes, it has been a democratic entity for a majority of the time since the country's foundation. The state of democracy can be judged by looking at the violations of the core principles of democracy as laid out by the United Nations.

=== Freedom of expression and association ===
Bangladesh has suffered from assaults on university students - who are regarded as the pioneers of grassroots movements in the past - in order to change their political opinions. After the 2018 elections were held, reports of vote rigging emerged which sparked protests by the Left Democratic Alliance. However, cases of police brutality and assaults on protesters were seen, as at least 50 activists were left with serious injuries.

In September 2018, the Bangladeshi government introduced the Digital Security Act. However, some laws in the act criminalised the freedom of expression as several cases of civilians being charged were revealed for posting anti-government comments online. In 2019, Bangladesh ranked 44 out of 100 in net freedom, with 0 out of 100 representing extremely limited net freedom.

=== Free and independent media ===
Journalism in Bangladesh has been under immense pressure as evident in the rankings of the country in the World Press Freedom Index. Bangladesh stood at 144 out of 180 countries in 2016, and the rankings only slipped as Bangladesh received 146 in 2018, 150 in 2019, and 151 in 2019. Amnesty International reported that the main hindrance to free journalism is that several media outlets in Bangladesh are affected by owners and political influence, which hinders the diversification of opinions. In 2016, some reporters argued that Bangladesh's press freedom had never been more restricted since the country's return to civilian rule in 1991. Amnesty International also revealed that the press is often intimidated by threats of physical violence and criminal cases against journalists. In 2011, the restrictions on press freedom drew international criticism after the then US Secretary of State, Hillary Clinton voiced her concern on the state of the freedom of press in the country.

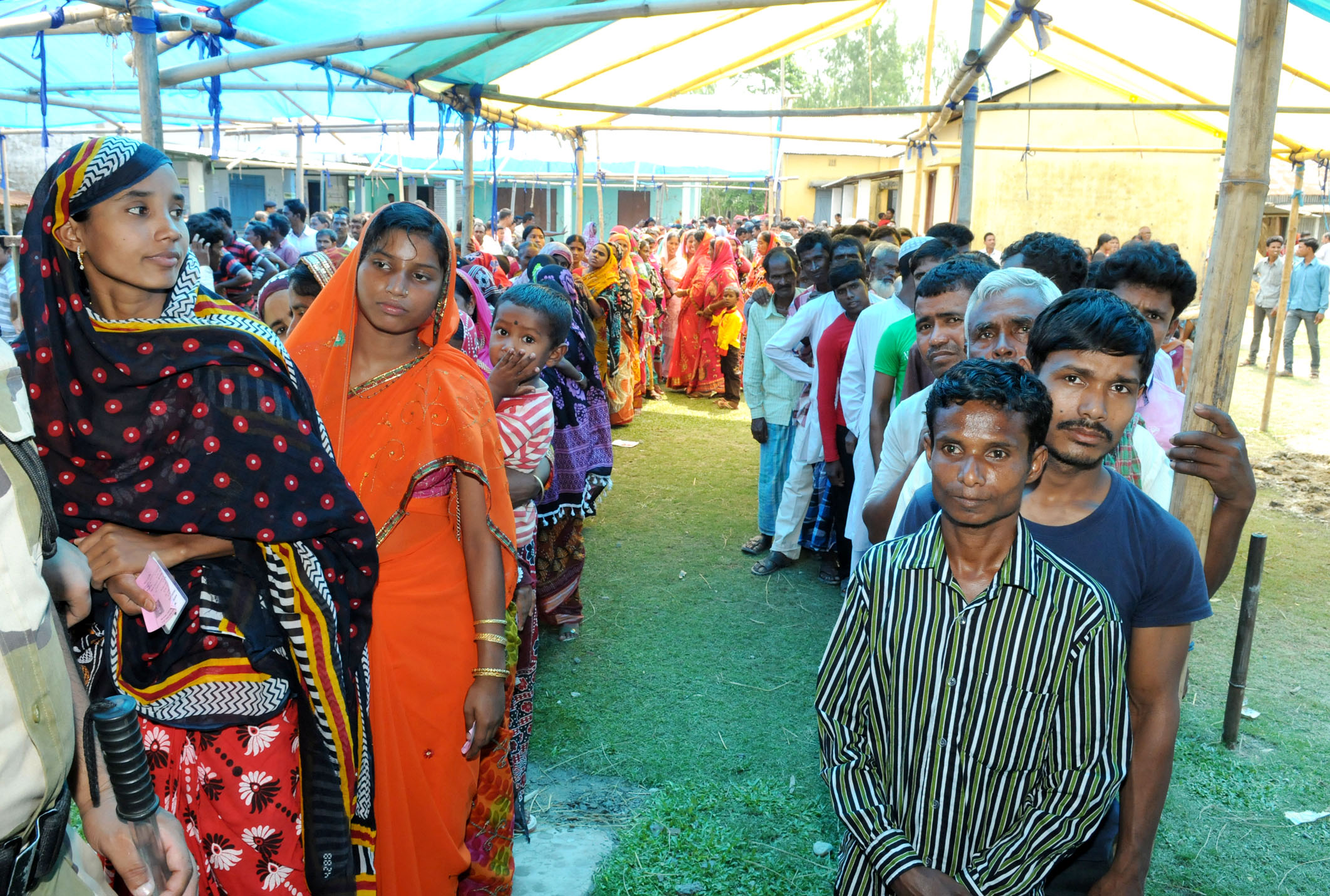
Voters standing in queue to cast their votes

=== Free and fair elections ===
Bangladesh elections in 2014 were marred with allegations of irregularities, such as voter suppression, fake votes and capturing of polling booths. The Bangladesh Nationalist Party (BNP) and its allies boycotted the 2014 elections as their demands of a caretaker government in place to oversee the elections were not met. This resulted in the Awami League to win the general election even as 153 out of the 300 parliamentary seats went uncontested. According to electoral agencies, only 10% of the eligible population cast their ballot in the 2014 general elections.

Furthermore, leading up to the 2018 general elections, the opposition parties questioned the Election Commission of Bangladesh (EC) on their neutrality as they believed them to be increasingly one-sided towards the ruling party. Media coverage and reports from human rights organisations revealed the Awami League's elaborate plan for voter suppression and arrests of opposition activists in the lead up to the 2018 general election. The ruling party and its allies won 288 out of the 300 parliamentary seats, which raised serious concerns over the legitimacy of the election held as previous election held by the caretaker governments from 1991 to 2008 usually resulted in less than 48% of the votes going to the election winner.

=== Independence of judiciary ===
The constitution of Bangladesh allows the President to appoint the Chief Justice of Bangladesh after receiving advice from the Prime Minister. Concerns of politically motivated court cases have continually emerged, and concerns regarding the politically appointed judiciary favouring the concurrent government is a contested debate in Bangladesh. In 2010, 6788 out of the 10,489 cases reviewed by a committee relating to the ruling party were dropped as the law ministry suggested that the cases were 'politically motivated'.

The lower and higher courts have faced multiple allegations of corruption and bribery. Several ruling party members who had allegedly been involved in land-grabbing scandals and corruption were not held 'accountable' in 2010.

=== Transparency and accountability in public administration ===
Using positions of power to grant favours to relatives, supporters and friends is considered a norm in Bangladeshi politics. Most leaders of Bangladesh have been alleged into being involved in large corruption scandals either directly or indirectly.

=== Respect for human rights and freedom ===
Violations of human rights in Bangladesh take the forms of extrajudicial killings and custodial torture and deaths. An estimated 154 extrajudicial killings in 2009 and 127 in 2010, though many suspect the actual number of casualties is greater.

Although local laws prohibit physical violence or mental torture of detainees and prisoners by state agencies, these laws were routinely broken, and in certain cases, the victims would effectively 'disappear'. From 2007 to 2008, several top businessmen and politicians were subjected to trials for charges such as financial corruption, tax evasion and bribery. Several of the top political leaders were then subject to mental and physical torture during detention.

Cases such as those of police brutality in early 2019 were evident, as police used force to disperse 50,000 protestors, resulting in one death and over 50 injuries.

== Quality of democracy ==
Bangladesh had a large voter turnout in 2009 and 2018 of 80%. Bangladesh scored 0.274 on the electoral democracy index in V-Dem Democracy Indices in 2023. The political competition in Bangladesh is limited due to high barriers of entry requiring large amounts of resources, which left only a small segment of the population having the ability to run political campaigns. A small segment of the political class divided among the existing political parties left few new policy alternatives being presented to the public. After the elections, only a few procedures for accountability were available to the public for the elected officials. After the election, members of parliament (MP) often indulged in being 'gatekeepers' of party policies in their constituency rather than serving their voters' interest. Voters often felt that their elected MPs either never visited their constituencies or visited infrequently. The same voters also felt that the interaction between MPs and their constituents is crucial for positive engagement and to monitor their performances in the parliament. In another survey of MPs, only 35 of the elected officials believed that they were being held accountable to their constituents. The members of parliament were also often unaware of all of the problems in their constituencies, due to a law permitting members of parliament to represent constituencies they are not from. Members of parliament may also be unaware of critical issues in their constituencies as they are based in Dhaka, rather than within their community.

Political parties in Bangladesh are also often structured in a way that the party leadership remains dynastic. As a result, the children of political leaders are expected to be future party leaders. Rare changes in party leadership reduced the ability of younger party members to gain higher-ranking positions, which also reduced diversification and differentiation of party policies.

Article 70 of the constitution also prevented members of a party from voting against a policy brought forth by other party members of the same party. This also reduced the ability of parliament members on their ability to vote in the interest of their constituents, having been forced to vote in the interests of the party.
