= Secularism in Bangladesh =

The four stars in the National Emblem of Bangladesh represent the four fundamental principles of the constitution: nationalism, socialism, democracy, and secularism. Like most other socialist countries, sheaves of paddy in the borders represent the agricultural workers as a symbol of socialism.

Secularism in Bangladesh is known as "neutrality of religion" (Bengali: ধর্মনিরপেক্ষতা) under Bangladeshi law. In the Constitution of Bangladesh, secularism is mentioned in the preamble as one of the fundamental principles of Bangladeshi law. Article 8 enshrines secularism as one of the fundamental principles of state policy. Article 12 elaborates further on secularism and freedom of religion.

In 1977, after the assassination of Sheikh Mujibur Rahman (in 1975), secularism was removed from the constitution by a Martial Law directive during the military dictatorship of Ziaur Rahman. In 1988, the Parliament of Bangladesh declared Islam as the state religion during the presidency of Hussain Muhammad Ershad. After the restoration of parliamentary democracy in 1990, the Bangladesh Nationalist Party (BNP) and Awami League governments retained Islam as the state religion. In 2010, the Bangladesh Supreme Court ruled that the removal of secularism in 1977 was illegal because it was done by an unconstitutional martial law regime. The court reinstated secularism in the constitution. The principle of secularity now co-exists with the state religion.

Secularism is a recurring topic in Bangladeshi politics. For example, in 2019, a demand by the Hefazat-e-Islam Bangladesh to curtail women's education was dismissed by the Deputy Minister of Education Mohibul Hasan Chowdhury as contrary to the fundamental principles of state policy. The separation of religion and state prevails across large parts of Bangladeshi law. However, family law is based on religious law. A civil marriage is allowed under the Special Marriages Act 1872 only if one renounces faith in either Islam, Hinduism, Buddhism, or Christianity.

== Constitutional law ==
=== Preamble ===
The preamble of the Bangladeshi constitution declares secularity as a basic constitutional principle. The second paragraph reads "Pledging that the high ideals of nationalism, socialism, democracy and secularism, which inspired our heroic people to dedicate themselves to, and our brave martyrs to sacrifice their lives in, the national liberation struggle, shall be the fundamental principles of the Constitution".

=== Article 8 ===
Article 8 of the constitution enshrines secularism as a basis for government policy. Part II of the constitution includes the fundamental principles of state policy. These 16 principles will have to be guided by secularism. Article 8 provides that "The principles of nationalism, socialism, democracy and secularism, together with the principles derived from those as set out in this Part, shall constitute the fundamental principles of state policy. The principles set out in this Part shall be fundamental to the governance of Bangladesh, shall be applied by the State in the making of laws, shall be a guide to the interpretation of the Constitution and of the other laws of Bangladesh, and shall form the basis of the work of the State and of its citizens, but shall not be judicially enforceable".

=== Article 12 ===
Secularity is further explained in Article 12 of the constitution. Article 12 sets out several goals, including the elimination of inter-religious conflict, the prohibition of religious discrimination and discouraging the use of religion in politics. The article is quoted below:-

The principle of secularism shall be realised by the elimination of -

- (a) Communalism in all forms;
- (b) the granting by the state of political status in favour of any religion;
- (c) the abuse of religion for political purposes;
- (d) any discrimination against, or persecution of, persons practising a particular religion.

=== Article 38 ===
Freedom of association is enshrined in Article 38, which states that "Every citizen shall have the right to form associations or unions, subject to any reasonable restrictions imposed by law in the interests of morality or public order". Reasonable restrictions apply if an organization is "formed for the purposes of destroying the religious, social and communal harmony among the citizens"; "formed for the purposes of creating discrimination among the citizens, on the ground of religion, race, caste, sex, place of birth or language"; "formed for the purposes of organizing terrorist acts or militant activities against the State or the citizens or any other country"; or if its aims are "inconsistent with the Constitution".

== Legal history ==
=== Early years of independence ===
"Secularism is not the absence of religion. We have seen fraudulence in the name of religion, exploitation in the name of religion, dishonesty in the name of religion, and oppression in the name of religion for 25 years. Religion is a very sacred thing. Sacred religion should not be used as a political tool. Religion is a very holy thing. Holy religion can no longer be used as a political tool. The constitution has made arrangements to protect the religious rights of seven and a half crore people through secularism."

— Sheikh Mujibur Rahman in his speech in the Constituent Assembly, 4 November 1972

The Constitution of Bangladesh was adopted by the Constituent Assembly of Bangladesh on 4 November 1972. It came into effect on 16 December 1972. The Constitution Drafting Committee was chaired by Law Minister Dr. Kamal Hossain. The Bangladeshi constitution became the second in South Asia to specifically use the word "secularism" in its text. This was followed by the Forty-second Amendment of the Constitution of India in 1976. A decisive change from the pre-liberation East Pakistan period was that religion-based political parties were banned. This meant the theocratic Jamaat-e-Islami, which opposed Bangladesh's independence and faced allegations of involvement in the 1971 Bangladesh genocide, was banned.

During the Awami League government of Sheikh Mujibur Rahman, opposition leader and leftwing cleric Maulana Bhashani talked about a "Muslim Bengal" as opposed to the League's secular Bengali platform. Amid these politics, Sheikh Mujib led Bangladesh to join the Organization of the Islamic Conference (OIC) in 1974. The OIC also included other secular Muslim majority countries like Turkey, Nigeria and Indonesia. The Islamic Foundation of Bangladesh was established to regulate the collection of zakat, religious matters and fixing dates for Muslim holidays.

Between January 1972 and January 1975, Bangladesh enjoyed a parliamentary government.

=== Martial law ===
On 4 May 1976, Proclamation Order III revoked the ban on religion-based political parties. On 23 April 1977, Chief Martial Law Administrator Ziaur Rahman issued the Proclamations (Amendment) Order 1977 that was published in an extraordinary Bangladesh Gazette. Zia inserted the Islamic phrase Bismillah in the constitution's preamble and replaced "secularism" with "Absolute Trust and Faith in the Almighty Allah". Zia also amended Article 25 by inserting a provision which read that "The State shall endeavor to consolidate, preserve and strengthen fraternal relations among Muslim countries based on Islamic solidarity". Zia later contradicted his own proclamation, remarking that "Eventually an effective political ideology cannot be based on any certain religion. Religion can offer some contribution, but an entire political activism cannot be oriented in accordance with religion. Political history of this region has the example of religion-based politics attempted during Pakistan era and it failed. Not only in Islam, people in other religions of many regions try to keep on politics based on religion. It's not right. It's important and it should be remembered". The Martial Law proclamation was approved by parliament in 1979; but this was declared illegal in the case of Bangladesh Italian Marble Works Ltd. v. Government of Bangladesh.

=== State religion ===
On 9 June 1988, the parliament of Bangladesh passed the eighth constitutional amendment. Article 2A was inserted to declare Islam as the state religion. This was seen as a move by President H M Ershad to win support among right-wing voters. Many MPs could not oppose the amendment due to Article 70 of the Constitution of Bangladesh which prohibits MPs from voting against their party. In 2011, Article 2A was amended to read "The state religion of the Republic is Islam, but the State shall ensure equal status and equal right in the practice of the Hindu, Buddhist, Christian and other religions".

=== Restoration by Supreme Court ===
The Fifth Amendment of the constitution was declared illegal by the High Court of Bangladesh in 2005, the government restored a constitution "in the spirit of the constitution of 1972" which also included secularism as one of the state principles. Nevertheless, the opening words 'bismillah-ar-rahman-ar rahim' (In the name of Allah, the Beneficent, the Merciful), that were added in 1997, remained in the constitution. In 2010, the Supreme Court of Bangladesh upheld the 2005 High Court ruling that the Fifth Amendment to the constitution was illegal.

=== Challenges to state religion ===
After the Eighth Amendment of the constitution on 7 June 1988, 15 personalities had filed a public interest litigation challenging the provision of state religion. On 1 August 2015, a Supreme Court lawyer named Samendra Nath Goswami filed another petition with the High Court challenging the legality of the constitutional provision of Islam as the state religion despite revival of "secularism" as a fundamental state policy under a 2011 amendment to the Constitution. On 28 March 2016, the high court rejected the petition and retained Islam as the state religion.

=== Interim government ===
After the fall of the Sheikh Hasina led Awami League government, the newly appointed attorney general, Mohammad Asaduzzaman, called for the removal of secularism from the constitution of Bangladesh. The Muhammad Yunus led interim government created a Constitutional Reform Commission which called for the removal of secularism from the constitution.

== Practice ==
In 2015, the UN Special Rapporteur on freedom of religion Heiner Bielefeldt commented about the country, stating that "Secularism in Bangladesh represents a commitment, entrenched in the Constitution, to create and uphold an open and inclusive space for religious diversity, free from fear and discrimination. Such an 'inclusive' understanding of secularism requires the State authorities to take concrete action and make long-term investment in education, civil society development, minority outreach programmes and other activities". K. Anis Ahmed, a writer and newspaper publisher, wrote in 2021 on the occasion of the country's golden jubilee that "Bangladesh, once regarded as a country doomed by disasters, has lately turned heads with the clipped pace of its economic and social progress, especially in women's empowerment, child and maternal health, and school enrolment. While Bangladesh's development gains deserve all the praise they are receiving, an equally important and impressive victory can be found in that secularism still remains a defining, though embattled, ideal of the country".

=== Family law ===
Bangladesh continues to follow colonial era segregated family laws based on religion, which is also the case in India and Pakistan. According to Arpeeta Shams Mizan of the Law Faculty in the University of Dhaka, "In Bangladesh, family law equals to religious law. Almost all marriages (be it Bangalee or indigenous) are intra-religious, homogenous, and conducted following the religious norms and customs. The only law allowing 'civil marriage', i.e. interreligious marriage is the age old Special Marriage Act, 1872, which contains a blatantly unconstitutional provision. Section 2 of this Act totally bars a Muslim, a Hindu, a Buddhist and a Christian to opt for interreligious marriage. In practice, the provision has translated in parties making an affidavit before a notary denouncing their faith and claiming that they do not follow any particular religion. While freedom of religion is a fundamental right under the Bangladeshi Constitution, and while as per the Committee on Civil and Political Rights this right to freedom of thought, conscience and religion implies that marriage laws of each State should provide for the possibility of both religious and civil marriages; the 1872 Act offers right to marry at the cost of foregoing freedom of religion".

=== Secular holidays ===
The Bengali New Year is Bangladesh's major secular public holiday, alongside patriotic holidays like Language Movement Day, Independence Day and Victory Day.

=== Religious pluralism ===
Secularism is seen as a pillar of upholding religious diversity in Bangladesh. Alongside Muslim majority holidays like Eid-ul-Fitr, Eid-al-Adha and Mawlid, all governments in Bangladesh have celebrated religious minority festivals as public holidays, including Durga Puja, Krishna Janmashtami, Buddha's Birthday and Christmas. Both the President of Bangladesh at the Bangabhaban and Prime Minister of Bangladesh host events respectively to mark these holidays. According to Prime Minister Sheikh Hasina, no Bangladeshi citizen should consider themselves as minorities. Speaking in October 2021, Hasina remarked that "You are considered as citizens of this country. You live in equal rights. You will enjoy equal rights. You will observe your religion and celebrate festivals with equal rights. That's what we want. This is the real policy of our Bangladesh and our ideal. I urge you again never to think of yourself as a minority".

== See also ==
- Islamization in Bangladesh
- Religion in Bangladesh
- Irreligion in Bangladesh
- Secularism in India
