= Article 70 of the Constitution of Bangladesh =

Constitutional article of Bangladesh

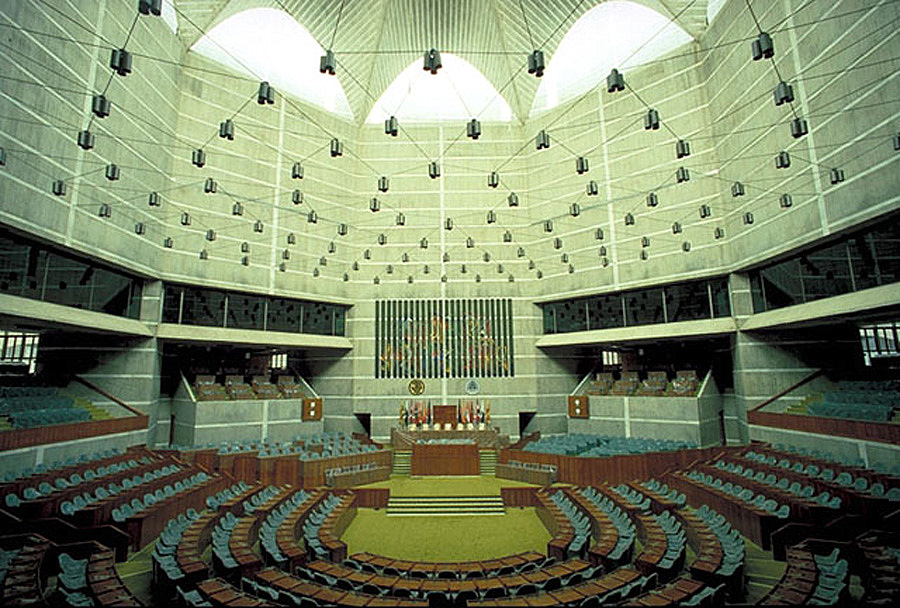
Bangladesh's parliament is described as a rubber stamp body due to Article 70, as MPs are unable to cross the floor or cast conscience votes.

Article 70 of the Constitution of Bangladesh is a clause that mandates strict party discipline in the country's Parliament.

== History ==
Article 70 was written as a result of the Bangladesh Constituent Assembly (Cessation of Membership) Order 1972, promulgated by President Justice Abu Sayeed Chowdhury. The president acted on the advice of Prime Minister Sheikh Mujibur Rahman. The prime minister was upset when KM Obaidur Rahman, a lawmaker from his own party, raised a question in the Constituent Assembly of Bangladesh, about why the assembly lacked law making powers. Under the 1972 interim constitution, law making powers were held by the executive branch.

== Text ==
The Article reads as follows:-

A person elected as a member of Parliament at an election at which he was nominated as a candidate by a political party shall vacate his seat if he –

(a) resigns from that party; or

(b) votes in Parliament against that party;

but shall not thereby be disqualified for subsequent election as a member of Parliament.

== Implications ==
The article prevents free voting and floor crossing by Members of Parliament, stipulating that MPs who vote against their party automatically lose their seats. As a result of Article 70, Bangladesh's parliament has largely functioned as a rubber stamp for actions taken by the ruling party or coalition. It has also been unable to hold a no confidence vote to remove a prime minister.

The provision is contrary to the norms of Westminster systems, as seen in the parliaments of the United Kingdom, Pakistan and Australia. In Bangladesh, the parliament typically reflects the will of the government, rather than vice versa, as is in the case in a well-functioning Westminster system. This also runs counter to the norms of other democratic systems, such as the German Bundestag and the Japanese Diet.

Critics argue that Article 70 contradicts fundamental rights in the constitution, including freedom of speech and freedom of conscience. The lack of accountability in parliament grants sweeping powers to the Prime Minister of Bangladesh, which is susceptible to dictatorship. Without the option of a no-confidence motion, the institutional checks and balances on a prime minister's power are significantly limited, as there are few remedies by which a Bangladeshi prime minister can be legally dismissed.

== Reform ==
Political scientists, public intellectuals, journalists, civil rights activists and members of parliament have called for the reform of Article 70.

While delivering judgements, the Supreme Court of Bangladesh has stated that Article 70 is undemocratic.

The abolition of Article 70 is part of the July Charter, a set of constitutional amendments to be voted on in the 2026 Bangladeshi constitutional referendum.

== See also ==
- Criticism of the Constitution of Bangladesh
- Parliamentary supremacy
