= Bengali nationalism =

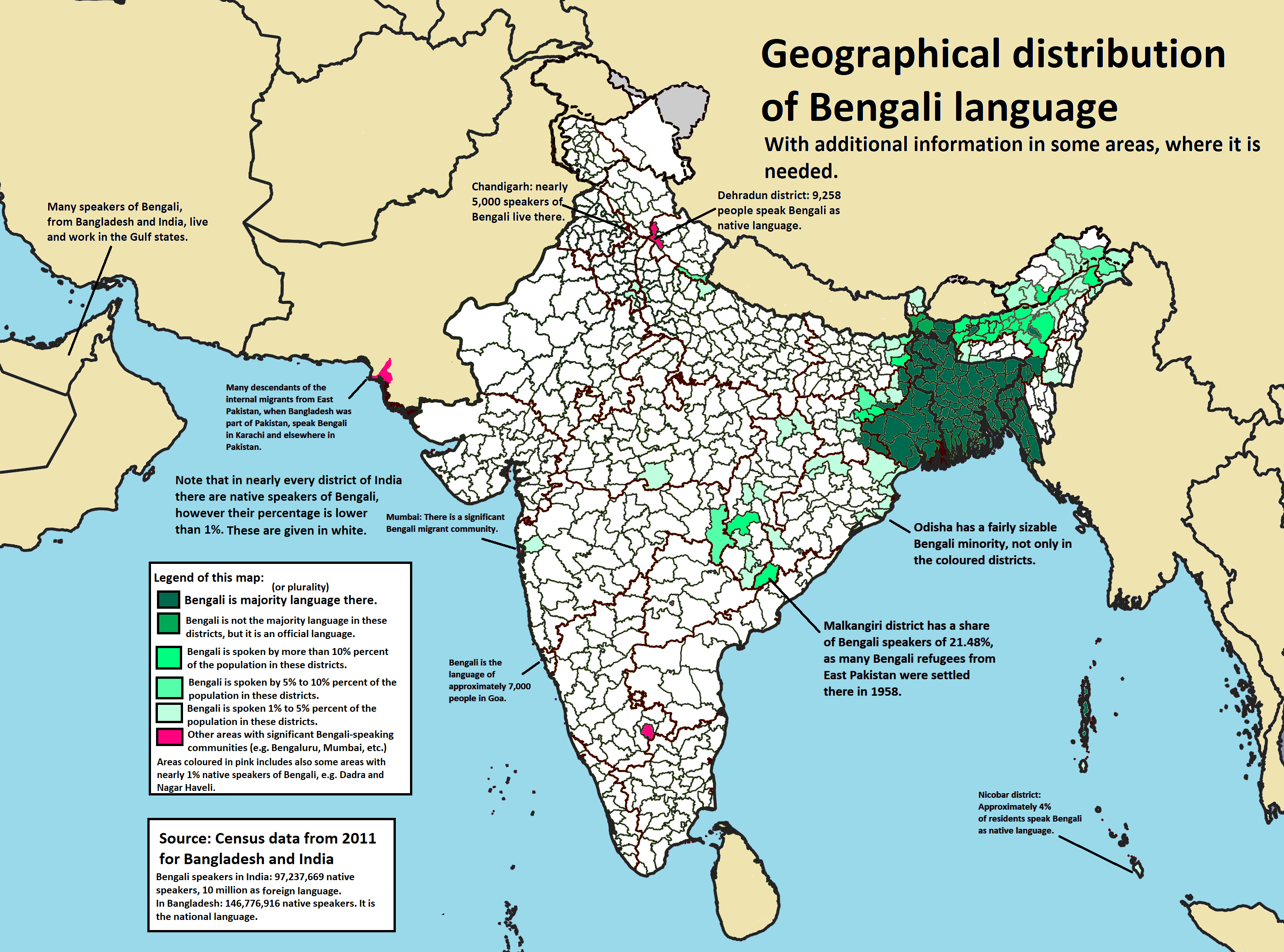
Map of Bengali language in Bangladesh and India (district-wise). Darker shades imply a greater percentage of native speakers of Bengali in each district.

Bengali nationalism (Bengali: বাঙালি জাতীয়তাবাদ, romanised: Baṅali jatiẏôtabad, pronounced [ˈbaŋali ˈdʒati̯oˌtabad]) is a form of ethnolinguistic nationalism that focuses on Bengalis as a single ethnicity by rejecting imposition of other languages and cultures while promoting its own in Bengal. Bengalis speak the Bengali language and mostly live across Bangladesh and the Indian states of West Bengal, Tripura and Assam (Barak Valley). Bengali nationalism is one of the four fundamental principles according to the Constitution of Bangladesh and was the main driving force behind the creation of the independent nation state of Bangladesh through the 1971 liberation war. Bengali Muslims make up the majority (90%) of Bangladesh's citizens (Bangladeshis), and are the largest minority in the Indian states of Assam and West Bengal, whereas Bengali Hindus make up the majority of India's citizens (Indians) in Indian states of West Bengal and Tripura, and are the largest minority in the Indian states of Assam and Jharkhand and the independent state of Bangladesh (8%).

== Bengali nationalism during British colonial rule ==
=== Background ===
Bengali nationalism is rooted in the expression of pride in the history and cultural heritage of Bengal. After the defeat in the Battle of Plassey on 23 June 1757, and Battle of Buxar in 1764, former Mughal province of Bengal-Bihar came under direct British control in 1772. During British rule, Calcutta served as the capital of British controlled territories in India as well as that of the province of Bengal until 1910. During the period, Calcutta was the centre of education. From 1775 to 1941 the emergence of Bengal renaissance (from the birth of Raja Ram Mohan Roy to the death of Rabindranath Tagore) was seen, which has an effect in growing Bengali nationalism. At that time, oriental language started to revive. This time, many of the philosophers did their best among them Fakir Lalon Shah, Raja Ram Mohan Roy, Ishwar Chandra Vidyasagar, Jibanananda Das, Sarat Chandra Chatterjee, Rabindranath Tagore, Kazi Nazrul Islam, Mir Mosharraf Hossain are more influential. In what is described as the Bengal Renaissance, the introduction of Western culture, science and education led to a major transformation and development of Bengali society. Bengal became a centre of modern culture, intellectual and scientific activities, politics and education under British Raj.

The first social and religious reform movements such as the Brahmo Samaj and Ramakrishna Mission arose in Bengal, as did national leaders and reformers such as Raja Ram Mohan Roy, Sri Aurobindo, Ramakrishna Paramhansa and Swami Vivekananda. Bengali literature, poetry, religion, science and philosophy underwent a massive expansion with the works of Bankim Chandra Chatterjee, Debendranath Tagore, Michael Madhusudan Dutt, Ubaidullah Al Ubaidi Suhrawardy, Sharat Chandra Chattopadhyay, Rabindranath Tagore, Satyendra Nath Bose, Jagdish Chandra Bose and Kazi Nazrul Islam.

The Young Bengal, and Jugantar movements and newspapers like Amrita Bazar Patrika led the intellectual development of India. The Calcutta-based Indian National Association and the British Indian Association were the earliest political organisations in India.

=== Partition of Bengal (1905) ===
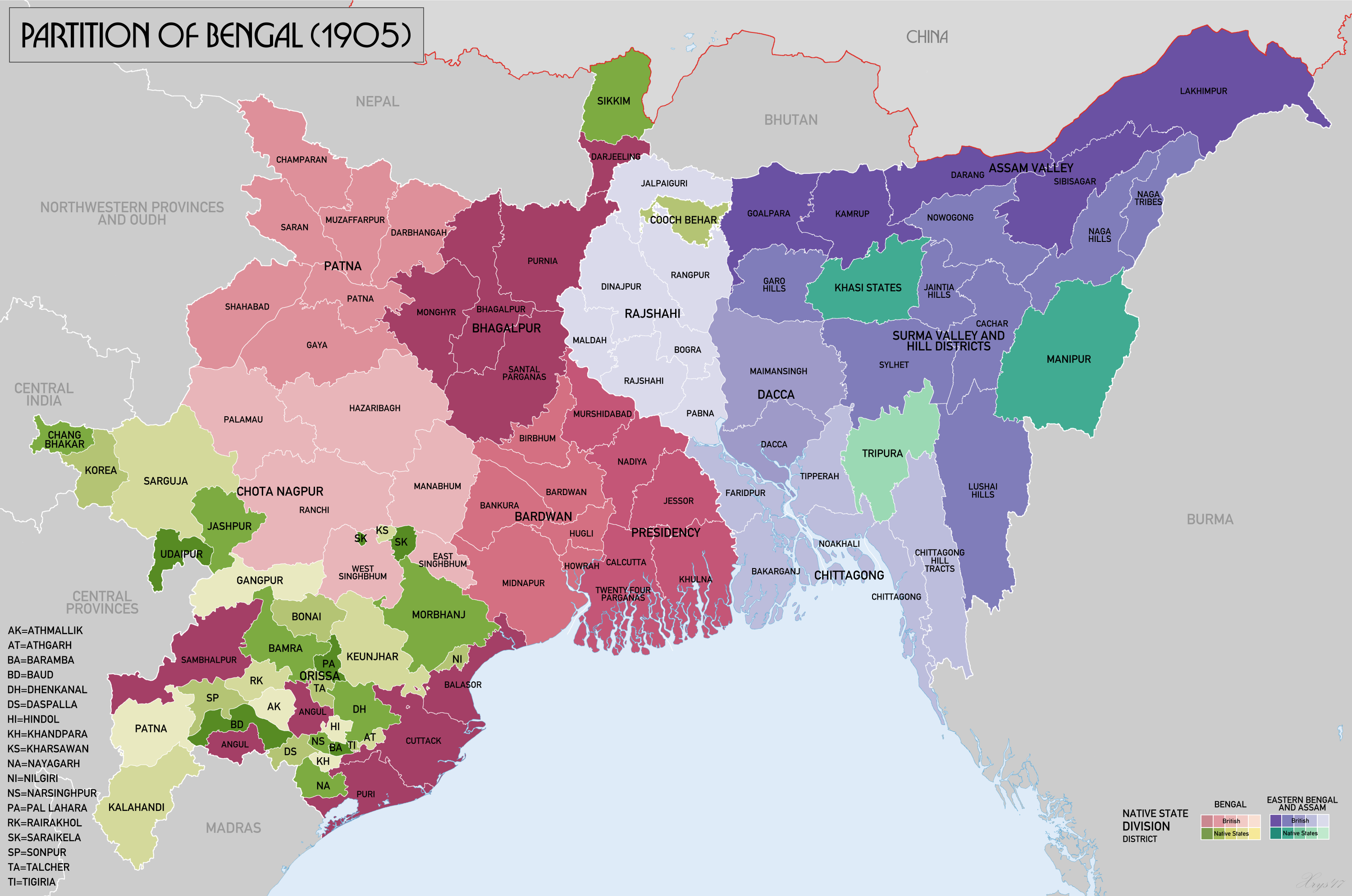
Map showing the result of the partition of Bengal in 1905. The western part (Bengal) gained parts of Orissa, the eastern part (Eastern Bengal and Assam) regained Assam, bordered by British Indian Bengal and Bihar, Nepal, Bhutan, British Burma and Tibet

The first Bengali nationalist agitation emerged over the 1905 Partition of Bengal by British authorities. Although the partition was supported by Bengali Muslims, a large majority of Bengalis protested the partition and participated in civil disobedience campaigns such as the Swadeshi movement and mass boycott of European goods. Seeking a united Bengal and rejecting British hegemony, Bengalis also spearheaded an emerging revolutionary movement, which assumed a central role in the national independence struggle.

It was during this time the Mother Bengal was an immensely popular theme in Bengali patriotic songs and poems and was mentioned in several of them, such as the song ″Dhan Dhanya Pushpa Bhara″ (Filled with wealth and flowers) and ″Banga Amar Janani Amar″ (Our Bengal Our Mother) by Dwijendralal Ray. Rabindranath Tagore wrote Banglar Mati Banglar Jal (Soil of Bengal, water of Bengal) and Amar Sonar Bangla (My golden Bengal), the national anthem of modern Bangladesh as a rallying cry for proponents of annulment of Partition. These songs were meant to rekindle the unified spirit of Bengal, to raise public consciousness against the communal political divide.

Bengal became a strong base of the Indian struggle for independence, giving rise to national political leaders such as Bipin Chandra Pal, Khwaja Salimullah, Chittaranjan Das, Maulana Azad, Subhas Chandra Bose, his brother Sarat Chandra Bose, Syama Prasad Mookerjee, A. K. Fazlul Huq, Huseyn Shaheed Suhrawardy. Of these, A. K. Fazlul Huq, Huseyn Shaheed Suhrawardy were involved in communal politics; leading to a separate Muslim state with Pakistan. Huseyn Shaheed Suhrawardy has been historically attributed the onus for creating and abetting the Great Calcutta Killings in 1946.

=== United Bengal Proposal ===
As the Hindu-Muslim conflict escalated and the demand for a separate Muslim state of Pakistan became popular amongst Indian Muslims, the partition of India on communal lines was deemed inevitable by mid-1947. To prevent the inclusion of Hindu-majority districts of Punjab and Bengal in a Muslim Pakistan, the Indian National Congress and the Hindu Mahasabha sought the partition of these provinces on communal lines. Bengali nationalists such as Sarat Chandra Bose, Huseyn Shaheed Suhrawardy, Kiran Shankar Roy, and Abul Hashim sought to counter partition proposals with the demand for a united and independent state of Bengal. Ideological visions for a "Greater Bengal" also included the regions of Assam and districts of Bihar.

Suhrawardy and Bose sought the formation of a coalition government between Bengali Congress and the Bengal Provincial Muslim League. Proponents of the plan urged the masses to reject communal divisions and uphold the vision of a united Bengal. In a press conference held in Delhi on 27 April 1947 Suhrawardy presented his plan for a united and independent Bengal and Abul Hashim issued a similar statement in Calcutta on 29 April. A few days later, Sarat Chandra Bose put forward his proposals for a "Sovereign Socialist Republic of Bengal." With the support of the British governor of the Bengal province, Frederick Burrows, Bengali leaders issued the formal proposal on 20 May.

The Muslim League and the Congress issued statements rejecting the notion of an independent Bengal on 28 May and 1 June respectively. The Hindu Mahasabha also agitated against the inclusion of Hindu-majority areas in a Muslim-majority Bengal, while Bengali Muslim leader Sir Khawaja Nazimuddin and Maulana Akram Khan sought the inclusion of the entire province of Bengal to Muslim Pakistan. Amidst aggravating Hindu-Muslim tensions, on 3 June British viceroy Lord Louis Mountbatten announced plans to partition India and consequently Punjab and Bengal on communal lines, burying the demand for an independent Bengal.

=== Partition of Bengal (1947) ===
A map of Bengal, divided between east and west.

In 1947, in line with the Partition of India, Bengal was partitioned between the Hindu majority west and Muslim majority East. East Bengal became part of the Islamic Republic of Pakistan while West Bengal became part of the Republic of India.

== Bengali nationalism in East Pakistan (1947–1971) ==
After the 19th century's Bengal Renaissance occurred in Bengal, it then was the four decades long Bengali Nationalist Movement that shook the region which included the Bengali language movement, the Bangladesh Liberation War and the creation of Bangladesh in 1971.

In the course of time, their works influenced the Bengali people to have a sense of separate identity. In 1905, as a result of the partition of Bengal, there were mass movements. During the time, Bangladesh national anthem "Amar Sonar Bangla" was composed. That event gathered Bengali people under same flag to keep Bengal province secure. Then, in 1947 the world saw an emergence of two countries Pakistan and India based on religious lines. The Bengali people accepted this division. After the birth of Pakistan East Bengali people expected that a change in fortunes. However, what they saw that new oppressors emerge in place of the old. Over the 24 years of political and financial exploitation followed, including the suppression of the Bengali Identity. Many protests, often led by students ensued. Some decided to take political action. On 23 June 1949 Awami Muslim League was established the leadership of Maulana Abdul Hamid Khan Bhashani. This party, led by Sheikh Mujibur Rahman played an influential role to create a new nation, Bangladesh ('The land of the Bengalis') in 1971 as a new country.

=== Factors behind the rise of Bengali nationalism in East Pakistan ===
==== Language issue ====
Right after the establishment of Pakistan, a controversy arose what would be state language of Pakistan. A movement is started in 1947 few months after the birth of Pakistan. Its main point was Bengali language. In the beginning, it was cultural movement, but gradually it took the form of a political movement. The language movement of 1948–1952, which was divided into two-stage movement. In 1948, it was restricted between educated and intellectual class and their demand was to make Bengali language as the state language. But in 1952 it's not only inadequate to the educated class, but also spread among the entire Bengali nation. At this stage, demand not only restricted to discrimination of language, but also it added in the social, political and cultural discrimination against the Bengalis. As a result, Language Movement brought Bengali nation on a single political platform and became aware of its own rights. In this way, the movement of the non-communal Bengali nationalist sentiment, the creation of new consciousness, the beginning of liberal outlook, the social change, the language movement took Bengalis into the new horizon. Language Movement motivates Bengali people to autonomy movement and motivates them in the struggle for independence to gain sovereign Bangladesh. So, it can be said that due to the language movement, the development of Bengali nationalism was created and helped to add a new country in world map called Bangladesh.

==== Cultural issue ====
Pakistan's two wings were isolated by one thousand miles of enemy territory in India. This unique geographical position could pose a grave threat to the integrity of the country. There was nothing common between two wings with the exception of religion. In a word, all the common identity that tie a nation-state, physical bonding, common culture, common language, habits of life was absent in Pakistan.

Eastern wing was only one-seventh of the total area of the country but its people surpassed the total residents of all other provinces and states of Western wings. Western wings residents spoke diverse languages such as Punjabi, Sindhi, Urdu and Pashtun. On the other hand, for Eastern wings residents, Bangla was the common language. It was also portrait of Bengali nationalism and egotism. The political professional in West wings predominantly came from the landlords. On the other hand, Eastern wings from professionals like lawyers, teachers and retired government officials. The people in the eastern wing were, therefore, more conscious about political matters and well aware of their rights compared to the people in the western wing who had been living in a society dominated by the feudal lords and the tribal chiefs. Education was more widespread in the eastern wing and middle class was strong and assertive. The politician and Government official from East and West wings had inconsistent ideas and objectives and they could not understand properly each other's problems. The Bengali politicians had more secular and democratic outlook which closest to the common peoples' mood and attitude. The West Pakistani dominated ruling class considered every demand of East Pakistanis as a conspiracy and a threat to the Islamic belief and reliability of the country. Culturally and psychologically at some extent, the country was divided long before 1971.

==== Educational and economic grievance ====
From 1947 Bangladesh (East Pakistan) is derived from their legal rights by Pakistan (West Pakistan). The East Pakistani population was 58% of the total population of the whole of Pakistan. Even this majority were not even allowed to have their language as one of the national languages until after a bloody battle between army and students. From the very inception of Pakistan, west Pakistanis dominated political, social, cultural and economic field of life.

Discrimination against East Pakistan started right from the outset in 1947, because, most of the private sector was located in West Pakistan. In addition, East Pakistanis felt that since the central policy making structures were dominated by West Pakistani civil servants, most of the lucrative import licenses were given to West Pakistanis. Moreover, East Pakistan's earnings enabled West Pakistani merchants and traders to enhance manufacturing and infrastructure facilities in West Pakistan and offered a maximum scope to the private sector in industries like cotton textiles, woollen cloth, sugar, food canneries, chemicals, telephones, cement, and fertiliser. Day after day from 1947 educational facilities, qualities were highly reducing in East Pakistan compare to West Pakistan. With the quality of education, number of school was reduced at that period.

As we know that education is the key element for any kind of development on any nation or state or province. But the above group indicates that how East Pakistan was discriminated by West Pakistan during 1950–1971. We can clearly see that though the number of primary school in the East Pakistan were higher than the West Pakistan during 1950-1961 but later on it was decreased compare to the west Pakistan. On the other hand, number of primary school in West Pakistan was an upward sloping line. Because, the number of primary school was increased from 1962 to 1971, Though East Pakistan was majority in term of population.

Most of the earlier leaders were from West Pakistan: the founder and the first governor general of Pakistan Muhammad Ali Jinnah was born in Karachi (A West Pakistan's city). Similarly, Bengalis were under-represented in the Pakistan armed forces and bureaucracy, as these areas were dominated by the West Pakistanis. For instance, in the total of 3 lakhs (300,000) of armed forces in 1970 only 40,000 personnel were from the East Pakistan, while in the Civil services numbers of Bengalis were much less as compare to their proportion of population.

Bengalis also were deprived from economic rights. Talking about economic disparities peter says "Although both the wings (East and West Pakistan) produced about the same quantities of food grains, nutritional levels of the Bengalis were lower. East Pakistan received only 25 percent of the economic portion of the aid. Agriculture and service contributed 70% and 10% respectively to East Bengal's GDP, the comparable figures for West Pakistan were 54% and 17% respectively.

The East wing had consistently received smaller public expenditure than its western counterparts. Given such disparity in the overall expenditure, it is no surprise that educational expenditure also followed suit.

The above group clearly indicates that East Pakistan was neglected by West Pakistan for per capita public expenditure by the provincial governments during 1952–1968. We can see that from the year of 1952 West Pakistan's public expenditure was an increasing way till 1968. On the other hand, per capita public expenditure of East Pakistan was always below compare to the West Pakistan's, though it was more increased from 1962 to 1968. But it was not enough in terms of majority population in the East Pakistan.

Following the partition of British India in 1947, political and economic tensions developed between East Pakistan and West Pakistan. These tensions were influenced by disparities in economic development, political representation, and access to resources. In 1966, Sheikh Mujibur Rahman introduced the Six-Point Movement, which called for greater political and economic autonomy for East Pakistan. The proposals faced opposition from the central government of Pakistan, contributing to growing political tensions and demands for regional autonomy among Bengalis in East Pakistan.

==== Political issue ====
Since 1947 Muslim League was in power. To defeat the Muslim League, was challenging. There was only one way to win the general election and that was to create an alliance among opposing parties of East Pakistan. It was mainly composed of four parties of East Bengal. On the election of 10 March 1954, The United Front won 223 seats out of 309 seats. Muslim League only captured 9 seats. The election result was a signal to the end of the dominance of the national elite in the politics of East Bengal. Towards the history of the independence of East Bengal 1954's election and United, Front formation was a very significant chapter. The oppression of the Muslim League against the Bengali nation, language, and culture and also the six years of tyranny of Pakistani rulers, against them this election was a ballot revolution.

Before the election, East Bengal's people were well aware that provincial autonomy is the only way to stop the oppression of West Pakistan. This unity was the reflection of nationalism among the people of East Bengal. They wanted their own identity based on their culture, their language. Though for the deceptive and undemocratic events created by Pakistani rulers did not allow the United Front to stay in power. Although it was failed, the political parties saw that people were supporting them for the country. The effect of this event was extensive in growing nationalism in the future.

From the beginning of the formation of Pakistan, the people of East Pakistan were demanding a constitution and constitutional rule but 1956's constitution did not reflect the expectation of the East Pakistani people. Their reaction was negative on this. It is also true that some of demands of the East Pakistani people were fulfilled. Government like the British, parliamentary system, state autonomy, and Bangla as the state language, these demands were fulfilled in this constitution. But it was doubtful whether it would work or not through the deception of the West Pakistani upper class. By the mutual understanding of East Bengal's politicians and West Pakistani politicians, the constitution was adopted. But they changed the name of East Bengal to East Pakistan. As we know, back then out of 69 Million population of Pakistan, 44 Million were from East Pakistan with Bangla as their mother tongue. It was expected by the East Pakistani people that the name of this province would remain the same. But it was also deception of West Pakistani upper-class people. East Pakistan did not get the proper representation in accordance with its huge population, moreover, they started to treat East Pakistan and West Pakistan as distinctive units and treat them differently. After these dissimulations, the constitution was no longer acceptable to East Pakistani people. Awami League was against the constitution. There were strikes against it but because of the differences between A K Fazlul Haque and Hussain Suhrawardy the strikes were not that effective. Before the constitution it was a war for language and after it was a war for their identity. It was clear that West Pakistan had no interest in the culture, language, and emotions of the East Pakistani people. East Pakistani people were deprived of their rights and their very own identity. The theory of nationalism grew stronger among the East Pakistani people. They wanted their own independent nation of the Bengalis as West Pakistan did not respect and treat them how they wanted to be treated. West Pakistan had no idea that this will backfire in their face. This event leads East Pakistanis one step closer to independence.

==== Six point movement issue ====
Six points movement was one of the most important events that eventually led East Pakistan to a new nation, Bangladesh. It was the result of the growing sense of nationalism in the mind of East Pakistani people. Six points movement was to describe the demands of the people of East Pakistan. The East Bengal nationalism was developed from almost the beginning of the partition of 1947, because of the disparity that we see in East Pakistan's history. The historic six points was the first powerful movement that was taken by the East Pakistani people against the central Pakistani Government. These six points demand of autonomy was declared by Sheikh Mujib. He said these six points are the "Muktir Sanad for the people of East Pakistan".

Before the six point's movement, the demands - that East Pakistani people made - were being a part of Pakistan. By these six points East Pakistani people got the identity themselves as a separate nation and claimed full autonomy. These six points represented the claims of mass people of East Pakistan. They collectively supported six points and participated in six point's movement.

In 1966, to make East Pakistan free from the colonial rules and oppressions, Sheikh Mujib declared six points movement. These six points were declared in Lahore in a political meeting. Considering the 18 years of struggle of East Pakistani people, the declaration was the supreme demand of autonomy under Pakistan. The Indo-Pak war of 1965 made East Pakistani people more restless and the military arrangements in East Pakistan made the demand of autonomy stronger. Eventually, Sheikh Mujib declared six points. After these six-points declaration people of East Pakistan got excited and they supported this movement whole-heartedly.

After 1966 the six point's movement gave East Bengal people the confidence and belief for the autonomous movement, election in 1970, and in the liberation war. In reality, there was no hint in the six point's movement of being separated from Pakistan. Moreover, Sheikh Mujib never mentioned such separation or possibility of the separation. If we look at the depth of the six point's movement, we see that first two points were about the regional autonomy of East Pakistan. The next three points were to remove the disparity between the two wings of Pakistan. The last point was to ensure he defence of East Pakistan. However, these six-points were not accepted by the West Pakistan.

After the six point's movement, the history has seen another important event in East Pakistan's history. As the six-points movement got no approval from West Pakistani authority, and moreover, they conspired against the major political leaders of East Pakistan. This case also holds an important meaning in East Pakistan's history, known as Agartala Conspiracy Case. This mass upsurge had objectives of freeing the political leaders and removing the military rulers. This upsurge was one of the landmarks in East Pakistani history. This mass upsurge developed the grown nationalism in the East Pakistani people. People from all over the East Pakistan joined this upsurge.

=== Bengali Language movement (1952) ===
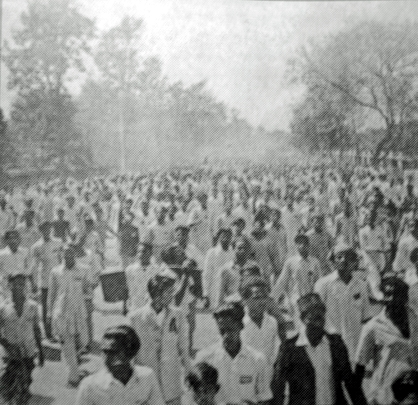
22 February rally after Janaja at Dhaka Medical College on Dhaka University road, Dhaka.

The Language movement was a political and cultural agitation in East Pakistan that centred on the recognition of the Bengali language as an official language of Pakistan and a broader reaffirmation of the ethno-national consciousness of the Bengali people. Discontent against Pakistan's "Urdu-only" policy had spilled into mass agitation since 1948 and reached its climactic strength after police fired upon and killed student demonstrators on 21 February 1952.

After the creation of Pakistan in 1947, the central government under Muhammad Ali Jinnah ordained Urdu to be the sole national language, even though the Bengali-speaking people formed a majority of the national population. The policy, compounded by sectional tensions served as a major provocation of political conflict. Despite protests in 1948, the policy was enshrined into law and reaffirmed by national leaders, including several Bengali politicians.

Facing rising tensions, the government in East Pakistan outlawed public meetings and gatherings. Defying this, the students of Dhaka University and other political activists started a procession on 21 February. Near the current Dhaka Medical College Hospital, police fired on the protesters and numerous protesters, including Abdus Salam, Rafiq Uddin Ahmed, Abul Barkat, and Abdul Jabbar were killed.

The deaths of the students served to provoke widespread strikes and protests led mainly by Bengali political parties such as the Awami League (then Awami Muslim League). The central government relented, granting official status for Bengali. The Language movement served as a catalyst for the assertion of the Bengali cultural and national identity within Pakistan.

==== Significance of Language movement ====
Language movement was not only developed for language dignity. In Pakistan, 7.2 percent of the people were Urdu speakers. On the other hand, 54.6 percent of the population did not want to accept that their mother language will be neglected. Most of the people were Bengalis so it was rational for Bangla to get the status. Along with this, the question of livelihood was also involved. In the beginning, Pakistan established in the centre of the capital administration in West Pakistan, in violation of the multiplicity of population in East Pakistan. There is a possibility of further lagging behind in various fields due to choose Urdu as the only state language of Pakistan. It was associated with Western mentality to deprive Bengalis everywhere including politics. Therefore, language movement makes the Bengalis skeptical about the Muslim nationalism of Muslim League and the two-nation theory. They choose Bangla language as the first stage to establish their rights. This Bengali nationalist spirit inspired the movement for anti-dictatorship and autonomy for the sixties and independent wars.

=== Creation of Bangladesh ===
Nationalist flag of Bangladesh

The Language movement and its fallout had created substantial cultural and political animosity between the two wings of Pakistan. Despite constituting a majority of the Pakistani population, Bengalis constituted a small part of Pakistan's military, police and civil services. Ethnic and socio economic discrimination against Bengali people aggravated and agitations arose in East Pakistan over sectional bias, neglect and insufficient allocation of resources and national wealth.

Steeped in Perso-Arabic culture, West Pakistanis thought Bengali culture too closely associated with Hindu culture even it served great contribution to Islamic Culture. Bengali Muslims became a constant victim of racism socially and culturally. One of the first groups demanding the independence of East Pakistan was the Shadhin Bangla Biplobi Porishad (Free Bengal Revolutionary Council). Under Sheikh Mujibur Rahman, the Awami League became more secular in character, changing its name from Awami Muslim League to just Awami League. and launched the Six point movement demanding substantial political, administrative and economic autonomy for East Pakistan.

Seeking democracy, a separate currency and balanced sharing of wealth and resources, Mujib also sought the recognition of the term "Bangla-desh" (Bengali: বাংলা-দেশ; Transla: Country of Bengal) to describe the eastern wing of Pakistan, instead of East Pakistan, thus emphasising the Bengali Identity of the people of East Pakistan. Mujib was arrested by Pakistani forces in 1966 and tried for treason in what became the Agartala Conspiracy Case. Following violent protests and disorder, Mujib was released in 1968. In the elections of 1970, the Awami League won an outright majority in the Parliament of Pakistan. When Pakistan's president Yahya Khan and West Pakistani politician Zulfikar Ali Bhutto resisted Mujib's claim to form the government, sectional hostility escalated significantly.

Before his arrest on the night of 25 March 1971, Mujib issued a call for Bengalis to fight for their independence; declaration of independence was proclaimed from Chittagong by members of the Mukti Bahini—the national liberation army formed by Bengali military, paramilitary and civilians. The East Bengal Regiment and the East Pakistan Rifles played a crucial role in the resistance. Led by General M. A. G. Osmani and eleven sector commanders, the Bangladesh Forces waged a mass guerrilla war against the Pakistani military. They liberated numerous towns and cities in the initial months of the conflict. The Pakistan Army regained momentum in the monsoon. Bengali guerrillas carried out widespread sabotage, including Operation Jackpot against the Pakistan Navy. The nascent Bangladesh Air Force flew sorties against Pakistani military bases. By November, the Bangladesh forces restricted the Pakistani military to its barracks during the night. They secured control of most parts of the countryside and the independent state of Bangladesh was officially declared by the Awami League's government-in-exile in Mujibnagar. Mujib's trademark "Joy Bangla" (Glory to Bengal) salute became the rallying cry of Bengali nationalists, who mobilised to form the Mukti Bahini guerrilla force, which received training and equipment from the Indian government. Indian intervention at the height of the liberation war would eventually lead to the surrender of Pakistani forces and the establishment of the Bangladeshi state on 16 December.

== Bangladeshi nationalism ==
Bangladeshi nationalism Bengali: বাংলাদেশী জাতীয়তাবাদ, romanised: Baṅladeśi jatiẏôtabad, pronounced [ˈbaŋladeʃiˑ ˈdʒati̯oˌtabad] is a civic nationalism that promotes the territorial identity of Bangladeshis. It originated as an ideology that emerged during the late 1970s and popularised by former President Ziaur Rahman.

The history of nationalism in the country dates back to the colonial era, when the region started witnessing anti-colonial movements against the British Empire. Soon, a sense of religious nationalism began to emerge that later revolutionised into an ethnonationalism that was the driving force behind the East Bengali liberation war in East Pakistan and the emergence of independent Bangladesh in 1971. However, the popularisation of a separate national identity other than ethnicity, and the alienation of ethnic minorities post-independence led later leaders to espouse a more democratic civic form of nationalism based on territorial attachment of the people. When army chief Ziaur Rahman came to power, he sought to invigorate state policy and began to promote Bangladeshi nationalism.
