= St. Mary's College, Kegalle =

St. Mary's College

Location
- Main Street, Kegalle, Sabaragamuwa Province, 71000; Sri Lanka
- Coordinates: 7°15′9″N 80°20′17″E

Information
- Type: National school
- Motto: Latin: Non Sibi Sed Patriae; English: Not for Self but for Country
- Religious affiliation: Roman Catholic
- Established: 1 March 1867; 158 years ago
- Founder: Fr. Domenico Singolani
- Principal: Gamini Karunaruwan
- Teaching staff: 135
- Grades: 1 to 13
- Gender: Boys
- Age: 6 to 19
- Enrolment: 3,000
- Language: Sinhala, English and Tamil
- Campus type: Suburban
- Colours: Red and gold
- Affiliation: Ministry of Education
- Alumni name: Old Marians
- Abbreviation: SMC
- Website: St. Mary's College, Kegalle

St. Mary's College (Sinhala: සාන්ත මරියා විදුහල; Tamil: செயிண்ட் மேரி கல்லூரி) is a Catholic boys' school located in Kegalle, Sabaragamuwa Province, Sri Lanka, adjacent to St. Mary's church. Established in 1867 by Benedictine missionaries, it was the first school in Kegalle. In 2023 it had approximately 3,000 students and 135 teaching staff. It currently offers primary and secondary education, and the college is under the management of Ministry of Education.

== History ==
St. Mary's College was established on 1 March 1867, the fifth Catholic school in the country established by the Benedictine missionaries. The school was founded as a vernacular English school in 1867 by Rev. Fr. Domenico Pingulani, a Benedictine missionary, in connection with St. Mary's church. It initially had 22 students and one teacher.

The Jesuit missionaries took over the running of the school in 1893. In 1902 Lucian van Langenberg was appointed the school's principal. In 1921 Rev. Fr. Berneart took over the administration of the school and by 1922 it had 110 students enrolled. In 1933 Rev. Fr. P. M. Baguet was appointed as principal. In 1947 St. Mary's College was elevated to a secondary school, with classes in English, Sinhala and Tamil. The same year the house system was re-introduced to the school, with the houses named after colours: red, blue, green and gold. In 1960 it was changed to a government school with 688 students enrolled and 36 staff. The school was elevated to a national school in 1995.

== Houses ==
The Students are divided into four Houses:

- – Nilwala
- – Mahaweli
- – Kelani
- – Walawe

== Notable alumni ==
Name	Notability
Jayanath Colombage	Admiral, Commander of the Sri Lanka Navy (2012–2014)
Amaranath Jayathilake	Film maker
Tharanga Paranavitana	Test cricket player (2009–2012)
Kalinga Indatissa	Lawyer
Sam Karunaratne	Professor and engineer
Chaminda Bandara	Cricket player (2016)
Chamod Yodasinghe	Sprinter
Maheepala Herath	Governor of North Central Province (2020–2024)
Udayakantha Gunathilaka	Member of Parliament (2020–2024)
Kanchana Welipitiya	Member of Parliament (2024–present)
K. T. Francis	Test Cricket Umpire
Bandu Samarasinghe	Actor
Edward Jayakody	Musician
Sir. Edwin Wijeyeratne	Lawyer, politician and diplomat
Buddhadasa Vithanarachchi	Actor
Premakumar Gunaratnam	Political activist
Asoka Handagama	Film maker
Rookantha Gunathilake	Singer/musician
