= Kalinga Indatissa =

Sri Lankan lawyer and academic

Attorney-At-Law Kalinga Indatissa PC
- Born: Kalinga Nandaka Indatissa
- Education: St. Mary’s College Kegalle Royal College Colombo Sri Lanka Law College
- Alma mater: Sri Lanka Law College
- Occupation: Senior Counsel
- Known for: 25th President - BASL

Kalinga Nandaka Indatissa PC is a Sri Lankan lawyer and 25th President of the Bar Association of Sri Lanka. He is also a legal academic. He has also held public office on several occasions and has represented clients in foreign jurisdictions. Indatissa is a prolific writer.

In 2018, Indatissa was awarded for his leadership in promoting sustainable development goals, by Sri Lanka United Nations Friendship Organisation. As an act of recognition for the role has actively played, being a role model and model leader, and for his efforts in the field of law.

== Early life and education ==
Born on September 12, 1965, in Colombo, Sri Lanka. He received his early education at St. Mary's College, Kegalle and Royal College Colombo. In 1982, at the age of 17, he enrolled at Sri Lanka Law College, where he excelled in his studies. Indatissa received a 1st Class pass at the 1st Year Examination and at the 3rd Year Examination. Indatissa entered the Bar in 1986.

== Legal career ==
After taking oaths, Indatissa worked as a junior lawyer in various chambers, such as the chambers of Eardley Perera President’s Counsel, Tivanka Wickramasinghe President’s Counsel and D. S. Wijesinghe President’s Counsel.

Following which he joined as State Counsel, at the Attorney General’s Department 1987. He entered the unofficial in 1991, and developed a practice mainly in criminal law.

He was the Junior Bar Committee - Convenor in 1988 & 1989, and was its Chairman in 1989, 1997, 1998, 2001, and 2006. He was also the Editor of the Colombo Law Society in 1991 and served as a committee member from 1990 to 1993.

In 1993 Indatissa was elected the Chairman of the Law Asia Young Lawyers Group and was a member of the Law Asia Council from 2002-2003. He was also an Executive Committee member of the Bar Association, and has held the position of Secretary.

Indatissa has also represented various clients in foreign jurisdictions. Such as Susanthika Jayasinghe in 1991 at an arbitration held by the International Athletics Association in Monaco (Regarding the Sydney Olympics), Arjuna Ranatunga (regarding a ICC match-fixing inquiry), here Indatissa acted as junior counsel to S. L. Gunasekara, Manju Wanniarachchi in both Delhi and Malaysia, and Sanath Jayasuriya for an ongoing ICC investigation by the ICC.

He also was appointed to commissions looking into the deaths of Lalith Athulathmudali, and General Denzil Kobbekaduwa.

== Public office ==
Indatissa has held numerous positions in public office. Such as being a member of Central Environmental Authority, a trustee of the Mahapola Higher Educational Trust Fund. He also served as an Advisor for the Mahapola Professionals Organization.

A senior consultant to the Ministry of Constitutional Affairs and as an Advisor to the Ministry of Interior. He was served as a Secretary of the Mahabodhi Society of Sri Lanka from 2004-2006. In May 2010, he was appointed as a member of Sri Lanka Cricket Interim Committee.

== Writing career ==
Indatissa is known for his extensive writing on legal topics in Sri Lanka. He has authored numerous articles, and has published 46 books on a wide range of legal topics. His publications are highly regarded and widely used in the legal community.
