= Saliya (name) =

Saliya is a given name. Notable people with the name include:

- Saliya Ahangama (born 1959), Sri Lankan cricketer
- Saliya Upul Aladeniya, (1963–1990), Sri Lankan soldier
- Saliya Pieris (fl. 2018), Sri Lankan lawyer
- Saliya Saman (born 1985), Sri Lankan cricketer
- C. N. Saliya Mathew (fl. 1993–2005), Governor of Sabaragamuwa
