= Udayakantha =

Udayakantha is a given name. Notable people with the name include:

- Udayakantha Gunathilaka (born 1965), Sri Lankan politician
- Udayakantha Warnasuriya, Sri Lankan film director
