= Manoj Rajapaksha =

Sri Lankan politician

Manoj Rajapaksha is a Sri Lankan politician. He was elected to the Sri Lankan Parliament from Kegalle Electoral District as a member of the National People's Power
