= Mawanella Polling Division =

Mawanella
- Polling Division
- Interactive map of Mawanella
- Coordinates: 7.217744°N 80.479362°E
- Country: Sri Lanka
- Province: Sabaragamuwa Province, Sri Lanka
- Electoral District: Kegalle Electoral District

Area
  - Total: 112.51 km^{2} (43.44 sq mi)

Population (2012)
  - Total: 111,727
  - Density: 993/km^{2} (2,570/sq mi)
- ISO 3166 code: EC-22E

The Mawanella Polling Division is a Polling Division in the Kegalle Electoral District, in the Sabaragamuwa Province, Sri Lanka.

== Presidential Election Results ==
=== Summary ===
The winner of Mawanella has matched the final country result 6 out of 8 times. Hence, Mawanella is a Weak Bellwether for Presidential Elections.

Year	Mawanella	Kegalle Electoral District	MAE %	Sri Lanka	MAE %
2019	NDF	SLPP	9.84%	SLPP	6.98%
2015	NDF	UPFA	10.55%	NDF	6.37%
2010	UPFA	UPFA	8.13%	UPFA	4.35%
2005	UNP	UPFA	7.12%	UPFA	6.39%
1999	PA	PA	3.40%	PA	3.44%
1994	PA	PA	0.27%	PA	6.44%
1988	UNP	UNP	2.98%	UNP	8.34%
1982	UNP	UNP	2.70%	UNP	5.68%
Matches/Mean MAE	6/8	7/8	5.62%	8/8	6.00%

=== 2019 Sri Lankan Presidential Election ===
Party	Mawanella		Kegalle Electoral District		Sri Lanka	
Party	Votes	%	Votes	%	Votes	%
NDF	37,967	50.09%	228,032	39.60%	5,564,239	41.99%
SLPP	34,443	45.44%	320,484	55.66%	6,924,255	52.25%
NMPP	1,856	2.45%	15,043	2.61%	418,553	3.16%
Other Parties (with < 1%)	1,533	2.02%	12,272	2.13%	345,452	2.61%
Valid Votes	75,799	99.27%	575,831	99.11%	13,252,499	98.99%
Rejected Votes	561	0.73%	5,152	0.89%	135,452	1.01%
Total Polled	76,360	83.46%	580,983	85.89%	13,387,951	83.71%
Registered Electors	91,492		676,440		15,992,568	

=== 2015 Sri Lankan Presidential Election ===
Party	Mawanella		Kegalle Electoral District		Sri Lanka	
Party	Votes	%	Votes	%	Votes	%
NDF	40,066	57.74%	252,533	47.05%	6,217,162	51.28%
UPFA	28,561	41.16%	278,130	51.82%	5,768,090	47.58%
Other Parties (with < 1%)	762	1.10%	6,108	1.14%	138,200	1.14%
Valid Votes	69,389	98.89%	536,771	98.80%	12,123,452	98.85%
Rejected Votes	778	1.11%	6,515	1.20%	140,925	1.15%
Total Polled	70,167	77.42%	543,286	79.85%	12,264,377	78.69%
Registered Electors	90,627		680,414		15,585,942	

=== 2010 Sri Lankan Presidential Election ===
Party	Mawanella		Kegalle Electoral District		Sri Lanka	
Party	Votes	%	Votes	%	Votes	%
UPFA	32,335	53.60%	296,639	61.80%	6,015,934	57.88%
NDF	27,039	44.82%	174,877	36.44%	4,173,185	40.15%
Other Parties (with < 1%)	953	1.58%	8,448	1.76%	204,494	1.97%
Valid Votes	60,327	99.29%	479,964	99.25%	10,393,613	99.03%
Rejected Votes	434	0.71%	3,604	0.75%	101,838	0.97%
Total Polled	60,761	73.15%	483,568	76.11%	10,495,451	66.70%
Registered Electors	83,066		635,342		15,734,587	

=== 2005 Sri Lankan Presidential Election ===
Party	Mawanella		Kegalle Electoral District		Sri Lanka	
Party	Votes	%	Votes	%	Votes	%
UNP	32,203	54.85%	223,483	47.67%	4,706,366	48.43%
UPFA	25,701	43.78%	239,184	51.02%	4,887,152	50.29%
Other Parties (with < 1%)	805	1.37%	6,106	1.30%	123,521	1.27%
Valid Votes	58,709	98.99%	468,773	98.99%	9,717,039	98.88%
Rejected Votes	602	1.01%	4,795	1.01%	109,869	1.12%
Total Polled	59,311	75.84%	473,568	78.68%	9,826,908	69.51%
Registered Electors	78,208		601,872		14,136,979	

=== 1999 Sri Lankan Presidential Election ===
Party	Mawanella		Kegalle Electoral District		Sri Lanka	
Party	Votes	%	Votes	%	Votes	%
PA	24,279	47.57%	210,185	51.30%	4,312,157	51.12%
UNP	23,730	46.49%	176,376	43.05%	3,602,748	42.71%
JVP	1,938	3.80%	14,997	3.66%	343,927	4.08%
Other Parties (with < 1%)	1,093	2.14%	8,122	1.98%	176,679	2.09%
Valid Votes	51,040	98.19%	409,680	98.05%	8,435,754	97.69%
Rejected Votes	943	1.81%	8,136	1.95%	199,536	2.31%
Total Polled	51,983	74.49%	417,816	76.52%	8,635,290	72.17%
Registered Electors	69,783		546,038		11,965,536	

=== 1994 Sri Lankan Presidential Election ===
Party	Mawanella		Kegalle Electoral District		Sri Lanka	
Party	Votes	%	Votes	%	Votes	%
PA	25,400	55.74%	211,676	56.06%	4,709,205	62.28%
UNP	19,367	42.50%	159,707	42.30%	2,715,283	35.91%
Other Parties (with < 1%)	803	1.76%	6,209	1.64%	137,040	1.81%
Valid Votes	45,570	98.27%	377,592	98.14%	7,561,526	98.03%
Rejected Votes	803	1.73%	7,139	1.86%	151,706	1.97%
Total Polled	46,373	73.61%	384,731	74.84%	7,713,232	69.12%
Registered Electors	63,001		514,055		11,158,880	

=== 1988 Sri Lankan Presidential Election ===
Party	Mawanella		Kegalle Electoral District		Sri Lanka	
Party	Votes	%	Votes	%	Votes	%
UNP	22,423	60.52%	168,720	57.11%	2,569,199	50.43%
SLFP	14,094	38.04%	119,769	40.54%	2,289,857	44.95%
SLMP	535	1.44%	6,923	2.34%	235,701	4.63%
Valid Votes	37,052	98.79%	295,412	98.57%	5,094,754	98.24%
Rejected Votes	452	1.21%	4,277	1.43%	91,499	1.76%
Total Polled	37,504	67.86%	299,689	67.98%	5,186,256	55.87%
Registered Electors	55,270		440,836		9,283,143	

=== 1982 Sri Lankan Presidential Election ===
Party	Mawanella		Kegalle Electoral District		Sri Lanka	
Party	Votes	%	Votes	%	Votes	%
UNP	24,108	60.02%	195,444	57.02%	3,450,815	52.93%
SLFP	13,814	34.39%	126,538	36.92%	2,546,348	39.05%
JVP	1,945	4.84%	13,706	4.00%	273,428	4.19%
Other Parties (with < 1%)	299	0.74%	7,074	2.06%	249,460	3.83%
Valid Votes	40,166	99.32%	342,762	98.69%	6,520,156	98.78%
Rejected Votes	275	0.68%	4,537	1.31%	80,470	1.22%
Total Polled	40,441	82.75%	347,299	84.30%	6,600,626	80.15%
Registered Electors	48,873		411,994		8,235,358	

== Parliamentary Election Results ==
=== Summary ===
The winner of Mawanella has matched the final country result 4 out of 7 times. Hence, Mawanella is a Weak Bellwether for Parliamentary Elections.

Year	Mawanella	Kegalle Electoral District	MAE %	Sri Lanka	MAE %
2015	UNP	UNP	9.63%	UNP	9.45%
2010	UPFA	UPFA	6.09%	UPFA	2.04%
2004	UNP	UPFA	5.78%	UPFA	5.14%
2001	UNP	UNP	7.28%	UNP	7.21%
2000	UNP	PA	6.50%	PA	5.56%
1994	UNP	UNP	2.57%	PA	6.09%
1989	UNP	UNP	1.34%	UNP	6.63%
Matches/Mean MAE	4/7	6/7	5.60%	7/7	6.02%

=== 2015 Sri Lankan Parliamentary Election ===
Party	Mawanella		Kegalle Electoral District		Sri Lanka	
Party	Votes	%	Votes	%	Votes	%
UNP	37,910	59.61%	247,467	49.52%	5,098,916	45.77%
UPFA	22,446	35.29%	227,208	45.47%	4,732,664	42.48%
JVP	2,282	3.59%	18,394	3.68%	544,154	4.88%
Other Parties (with < 1%)	960	1.51%	6,661	1.33%	101,045	0.91%
Valid Votes	63,598	96.41%	499,730	96.35%	11,140,333	95.35%
Rejected Votes	2,348	3.56%	18,770	3.62%	516,926	4.42%
Total Polled	65,968	72.79%	518,674	79.81%	11,684,111	77.66%
Registered Electors	90,627		649,878		15,044,490	

=== 2010 Sri Lankan Parliamentary Election ===
Party	Mawanella		Kegalle Electoral District		Sri Lanka	
Party	Votes	%	Votes	%	Votes	%
UPFA	26,467	60.62%	242,463	66.89%	4,846,388	60.38%
UNP	15,476	35.45%	104,925	28.95%	2,357,057	29.37%
DNA	1,544	3.54%	13,518	3.73%	441,251	5.50%
Other Parties (with < 1%)	175	0.40%	1,549	0.43%	33,973	0.42%
Valid Votes	43,662	93.59%	362,455	93.32%	8,026,322	96.03%
Rejected Votes	2,989	6.41%	25,965	6.68%	581,465	6.96%
Total Polled	46,651	56.16%	388,420	60.93%	8,358,246	59.29%
Registered Electors	83,066		637,524		14,097,690	

=== 2004 Sri Lankan Parliamentary Election ===
Party	Mawanella		Kegalle Electoral District		Sri Lanka	
Party	Votes	%	Votes	%	Votes	%
UNP	26,099	49.36%	186,641	44.32%	3,486,792	37.73%
UPFA	23,290	44.05%	214,267	50.88%	4,223,126	45.70%
JHU	3,151	5.96%	18,034	4.28%	552,723	5.98%
Other Parties (with < 1%)	334	0.63%	2,187	0.52%	59,247	0.64%
Valid Votes	52,874	94.88%	421,134	94.25%	9,241,931	94.52%
Rejected Votes	2,853	5.12%	25,685	5.75%	534,452	5.47%
Total Polled	55,727	73.21%	446,816	78.35%	9,777,821	75.74%
Registered Electors	76,115		570,299		12,909,631	

=== 2001 Sri Lankan Parliamentary Election ===
Party	Mawanella		Kegalle Electoral District		Sri Lanka	
Party	Votes	%	Votes	%	Votes	%
UNP	30,845	57.76%	208,104	49.36%	4,086,026	45.62%
PA	17,641	33.03%	170,901	40.53%	3,330,815	37.19%
JVP	4,116	7.71%	36,711	8.71%	815,353	9.10%
Other Parties (with < 1%)	801	1.50%	5,924	1.40%	123,245	1.38%
Valid Votes	53,403	95.43%	421,640	94.90%	8,955,844	94.77%
Rejected Votes	2,560	4.57%	22,669	5.10%	494,009	5.23%
Total Polled	55,963	76.59%	444,309	80.10%	9,449,878	76.03%
Registered Electors	73,064		554,698		12,428,762	

=== 2000 Sri Lankan Parliamentary Election ===
Party	Mawanella		Kegalle Electoral District		Sri Lanka	
Party	Votes	%	Votes	%	Votes	%
UNP	23,751	47.49%	175,627	42.69%	3,451,765	40.12%
PA	19,976	39.94%	201,114	48.88%	3,899,329	45.33%
NUA	2,901	5.80%	4,797	1.17%	185,593	2.16%
JVP	2,428	4.86%	22,028	5.35%	518,725	6.03%
Other Parties (with < 1%)	953	1.91%	7,846	1.91%	233,914	2.72%
Valid Votes	50,009	N/A	411,412	N/A	8,602,617	N/A

=== 1994 Sri Lankan Parliamentary Election ===
Party	Mawanella		Kegalle Electoral District		Sri Lanka	
Party	Votes	%	Votes	%	Votes	%
UNP	25,921	53.79%	203,938	51.24%	3,498,370	44.04%
PA	21,814	45.27%	190,689	47.91%	3,887,805	48.94%
Other Parties (with < 1%)	452	0.94%	3,383	0.85%	90,078	1.13%
Valid Votes	48,187	96.00%	398,010	95.89%	7,943,688	95.20%
Rejected Votes	2,010	4.00%	17,043	4.11%	400,395	4.80%
Total Polled	50,197	79.68%	415,053	80.78%	8,344,095	74.75%
Registered Electors	63,001		513,825		11,163,064	

=== 1989 Sri Lankan Parliamentary Election ===
Party	Mawanella		Kegalle Electoral District		Sri Lanka	
Party	Votes	%	Votes	%	Votes	%
UNP	20,193	60.39%	174,334	61.12%	2,838,005	50.71%
SLFP	9,066	27.11%	80,668	28.28%	1,785,369	31.90%
ELJP	3,831	11.46%	14,056	4.93%	67,723	1.21%
Other Parties (with < 1%)	348	1.04%	16,196	5.68%	232,463	4.15%
Valid Votes	33,438	93.37%	285,254	93.95%	5,596,468	93.87%
Rejected Votes	2,375	6.63%	18,362	6.05%	365,563	6.13%
Total Polled	35,813	66.15%	303,616	69.46%	5,962,031	63.60%
Registered Electors	54,137		437,131		9,374,164	

== Demographics ==
=== Ethnicity ===
The Mawanella Polling Division has a Sinhalese majority (68.4%) and a significant Moor population (30.3%) . In comparison, the Kegalle Electoral District (which contains the Mawanella Polling Division) has a Sinhalese majority (85.5%)

Ethnicity in Mawanella
1. Sinhalese (68.4%)
2. Moor (30.3%)
3. Other (1.40%)

=== Religion ===
The Mawanella Polling Division has a Buddhist majority (68.1%) and a significant Muslim population (30.4%) . In comparison, the Kegalle Electoral District (which contains the Mawanella Polling Division) has a Buddhist majority (84.4%)

Religion in Mawanella
1. Buddhist (68.1%)
2. Muslim (30.4%)
3. Other (1.40%)
