= Galigamuwa Polling Division =

Galigamuwa
- Polling Division
- Interactive map of Galigamuwa
- Coordinates: 7.224161°N 80.305520°E
- Country: Sri Lanka
- Province: Sabaragamuwa Province, Sri Lanka
- Electoral District: Kegalle Electoral District

Area
  - Total: 131.09 km^{2} (50.61 sq mi)

Population (2012)
  - Total: 74,490
  - Density: 568/km^{2} (1,470/sq mi)
- ISO 3166 code: EC-22B

The Galigamuwa Polling Division is a Polling Division in the Kegalle Electoral District, in the Sabaragamuwa Province, Sri Lanka.

== Presidential Election Results ==
=== Summary ===
The winner of Galigamuwa has matched the final country result 7 out of 8 times. Hence, Galigamuwa is a Bellwether for Presidential Elections.

Year	Galigamuwa	Kegalle Electoral District	MAE %	Sri Lanka	MAE %
2019	SLPP	SLPP	2.57%	SLPP	5.35%
2015	UPFA	UPFA	3.27%	NDF	7.46%
2010	UPFA	UPFA	2.79%	UPFA	6.56%
2005	UPFA	UPFA	1.67%	UPFA	2.41%
1999	PA	PA	0.76%	PA	0.79%
1994	PA	PA	1.73%	PA	4.44%
1988	UNP	UNP	4.07%	UNP	1.53%
1982	UNP	UNP	4.66%	UNP	1.65%
Matches/Mean MAE	7/8	7/8	2.69%	8/8	3.77%

=== 2019 Sri Lankan Presidential Election ===
Party	Galigamuwa		Kegalle Electoral District		Sri Lanka	
Party	Votes	%	Votes	%	Votes	%
SLPP	32,376	58.36%	320,484	55.66%	6,924,255	52.25%
NDF	20,475	36.91%	228,032	39.60%	5,564,239	41.99%
NMPP	1,405	2.53%	15,043	2.61%	418,553	3.16%
Other Parties (with < 1%)	1,224	2.21%	12,272	2.13%	345,452	2.61%
Valid Votes	55,480	99.16%	575,831	99.11%	13,252,499	98.99%
Rejected Votes	472	0.84%	5,152	0.89%	135,452	1.01%
Total Polled	55,952	85.64%	580,983	85.89%	13,387,951	83.71%
Registered Electors	65,331		676,440		15,992,568	

=== 2015 Sri Lankan Presidential Election ===
Party	Galigamuwa		Kegalle Electoral District		Sri Lanka	
Party	Votes	%	Votes	%	Votes	%
UPFA	28,608	55.11%	278,130	51.82%	5,768,090	47.58%
NDF	22,699	43.73%	252,533	47.05%	6,217,162	51.28%
Other Parties (with < 1%)	604	1.16%	6,108	1.14%	138,200	1.14%
Valid Votes	51,911	98.38%	536,771	98.80%	12,123,452	98.85%
Rejected Votes	855	1.62%	6,515	1.20%	140,925	1.15%
Total Polled	52,766	78.32%	543,286	79.85%	12,264,377	78.69%
Registered Electors	67,375		680,414		15,585,942	

=== 2010 Sri Lankan Presidential Election ===
Party	Galigamuwa		Kegalle Electoral District		Sri Lanka	
Party	Votes	%	Votes	%	Votes	%
UPFA	30,980	64.61%	296,639	61.80%	6,015,934	57.88%
NDF	16,077	33.53%	174,877	36.44%	4,173,185	40.15%
Other Parties (with < 1%)	889	1.85%	8,448	1.76%	204,494	1.97%
Valid Votes	47,946	99.32%	479,964	99.25%	10,393,613	99.03%
Rejected Votes	330	0.68%	3,604	0.75%	101,838	0.97%
Total Polled	48,276	74.77%	483,568	76.11%	10,495,451	66.70%
Registered Electors	64,565		635,342		15,734,587	

=== 2005 Sri Lankan Presidential Election ===
Party	Galigamuwa		Kegalle Electoral District		Sri Lanka	
Party	Votes	%	Votes	%	Votes	%
UPFA	25,086	52.68%	239,184	51.02%	4,887,152	50.29%
UNP	21,875	45.94%	223,483	47.67%	4,706,366	48.43%
Other Parties (with < 1%)	655	1.38%	6,106	1.30%	123,521	1.27%
Valid Votes	47,616	99.08%	468,773	98.99%	9,717,039	98.88%
Rejected Votes	443	0.92%	4,795	1.01%	109,869	1.12%
Total Polled	48,059	77.60%	473,568	78.68%	9,826,908	69.51%
Registered Electors	61,932		601,872		14,136,979	

=== 1999 Sri Lankan Presidential Election ===
Party	Galigamuwa		Kegalle Electoral District		Sri Lanka	
Party	Votes	%	Votes	%	Votes	%
PA	21,032	50.34%	210,185	51.30%	4,312,157	51.12%
UNP	18,227	43.63%	176,376	43.05%	3,602,748	42.71%
JVP	1,670	4.00%	14,997	3.66%	343,927	4.08%
Other Parties (with < 1%)	852	2.04%	8,122	1.98%	176,679	2.09%
Valid Votes	41,781	98.24%	409,680	98.05%	8,435,754	97.69%
Rejected Votes	750	1.76%	8,136	1.95%	199,536	2.31%
Total Polled	42,531	74.32%	417,816	76.52%	8,635,290	72.17%
Registered Electors	57,224		546,038		11,965,536	

=== 1994 Sri Lankan Presidential Election ===
Party	Galigamuwa		Kegalle Electoral District		Sri Lanka	
Party	Votes	%	Votes	%	Votes	%
PA	22,942	57.83%	211,676	56.06%	4,709,205	62.28%
UNP	16,086	40.55%	159,707	42.30%	2,715,283	35.91%
Other Parties (with < 1%)	641	1.62%	6,209	1.64%	137,040	1.81%
Valid Votes	39,669	98.28%	377,592	98.14%	7,561,526	98.03%
Rejected Votes	696	1.72%	7,139	1.86%	151,706	1.97%
Total Polled	40,365	74.69%	384,731	74.84%	7,713,232	69.12%
Registered Electors	54,044		514,055		11,158,880	

=== 1988 Sri Lankan Presidential Election ===
Party	Galigamuwa		Kegalle Electoral District		Sri Lanka	
Party	Votes	%	Votes	%	Votes	%
UNP	16,732	53.16%	168,720	57.11%	2,569,199	50.43%
SLFP	14,160	44.99%	119,769	40.54%	2,289,857	44.95%
SLMP	580	1.84%	6,923	2.34%	235,701	4.63%
Valid Votes	31,472	98.22%	295,412	98.57%	5,094,754	98.24%
Rejected Votes	570	1.78%	4,277	1.43%	91,499	1.76%
Total Polled	32,042	66.38%	299,689	67.98%	5,186,256	55.87%
Registered Electors	48,269		440,836		9,283,143	

=== 1982 Sri Lankan Presidential Election ===
Party	Galigamuwa		Kegalle Electoral District		Sri Lanka	
Party	Votes	%	Votes	%	Votes	%
UNP	19,599	52.39%	195,444	57.02%	3,450,815	52.93%
SLFP	15,842	42.35%	126,538	36.92%	2,546,348	39.05%
JVP	1,477	3.95%	13,706	4.00%	273,428	4.19%
LSSP	403	1.08%	6,184	1.80%	58,531	0.90%
Other Parties (with < 1%)	86	0.23%	890	0.26%	190,929	2.93%
Valid Votes	37,407	98.71%	342,762	98.69%	6,520,156	98.78%
Rejected Votes	490	1.29%	4,537	1.31%	80,470	1.22%
Total Polled	37,897	84.01%	347,299	84.30%	6,600,626	80.15%
Registered Electors	45,109		411,994		8,235,358	

== Parliamentary Election Results ==
=== Summary ===
The winner of Galigamuwa has matched the final country result 6 out of 7 times.

Year	Galigamuwa	Kegalle Electoral District	MAE %	Sri Lanka	MAE %
2015	UPFA	UNP	2.84%	UNP	3.19%
2010	UPFA	UPFA	2.14%	UPFA	6.12%
2004	UPFA	UPFA	1.59%	UPFA	5.30%
2001	UNP	UNP	1.95%	UNP	2.92%
2000	PA	PA	0.49%	PA	2.78%
1994	PA	UNP	1.75%	PA	2.82%
1989	UNP	UNP	3.49%	UNP	6.01%
Matches/Mean MAE	6/7	6/7	2.03%	7/7	4.16%

=== 2015 Sri Lankan Parliamentary Election ===
Party	Galigamuwa		Kegalle Electoral District		Sri Lanka	
Party	Votes	%	Votes	%	Votes	%
UPFA	23,663	48.73%	227,208	45.47%	4,732,664	42.48%
UNP	22,724	46.80%	247,467	49.52%	5,098,916	45.77%
JVP	1,716	3.53%	18,394	3.68%	544,154	4.88%
Other Parties (with < 1%)	456	0.94%	6,661	1.33%	101,045	0.91%
Valid Votes	48,559	96.42%	499,730	96.35%	11,140,333	95.35%
Rejected Votes	1,795	3.56%	18,770	3.62%	516,926	4.42%
Total Polled	50,364	74.75%	518,674	79.81%	11,684,111	77.66%
Registered Electors	67,375		649,878		15,044,490	

=== 2010 Sri Lankan Parliamentary Election ===
Party	Galigamuwa		Kegalle Electoral District		Sri Lanka	
Party	Votes	%	Votes	%	Votes	%
UPFA	24,552	69.00%	242,463	66.89%	4,846,388	60.38%
UNP	9,423	26.48%	104,925	28.95%	2,357,057	29.37%
DNA	1,485	4.17%	13,518	3.73%	441,251	5.50%
Other Parties (with < 1%)	125	0.35%	1,549	0.43%	33,973	0.42%
Valid Votes	35,585	93.51%	362,455	93.32%	8,026,322	96.03%
Rejected Votes	2,471	6.49%	25,965	6.68%	581,465	6.96%
Total Polled	38,056	58.94%	388,420	60.93%	8,358,246	59.29%
Registered Electors	64,565		637,524		14,097,690	

=== 2004 Sri Lankan Parliamentary Election ===
Party	Galigamuwa		Kegalle Electoral District		Sri Lanka	
Party	Votes	%	Votes	%	Votes	%
UPFA	22,980	52.75%	214,267	50.88%	4,223,126	45.70%
UNP	18,693	42.91%	186,641	44.32%	3,486,792	37.73%
JHU	1,715	3.94%	18,034	4.28%	552,723	5.98%
Other Parties (with < 1%)	177	0.41%	2,187	0.52%	59,247	0.64%
Valid Votes	43,565	94.83%	421,134	94.25%	9,241,931	94.52%
Rejected Votes	2,373	5.17%	25,685	5.75%	534,452	5.47%
Total Polled	45,938	75.87%	446,816	78.35%	9,777,821	75.74%
Registered Electors	60,550		570,299		12,909,631	

=== 2001 Sri Lankan Parliamentary Election ===
Party	Galigamuwa		Kegalle Electoral District		Sri Lanka	
Party	Votes	%	Votes	%	Votes	%
UNP	20,569	47.33%	208,104	49.36%	4,086,026	45.62%
PA	18,619	42.84%	170,901	40.53%	3,330,815	37.19%
JVP	3,736	8.60%	36,711	8.71%	815,353	9.10%
Other Parties (with < 1%)	539	1.24%	5,924	1.40%	123,245	1.38%
Valid Votes	43,463	95.15%	421,640	94.90%	8,955,844	94.77%
Rejected Votes	2,217	4.85%	22,669	5.10%	494,009	5.23%
Total Polled	45,680	77.42%	444,309	80.10%	9,449,878	76.03%
Registered Electors	59,001		554,698		12,428,762	

=== 2000 Sri Lankan Parliamentary Election ===
Party	Galigamuwa		Kegalle Electoral District		Sri Lanka	
Party	Votes	%	Votes	%	Votes	%
PA	20,284	48.52%	201,114	48.88%	3,899,329	45.33%
UNP	18,109	43.32%	175,627	42.69%	3,451,765	40.12%
JVP	2,468	5.90%	22,028	5.35%	518,725	6.03%
SU	556	1.33%	4,549	1.11%	127,859	1.49%
Other Parties (with < 1%)	390	0.93%	8,094	1.97%	291,648	3.39%
Valid Votes	41,807	N/A	411,412	N/A	8,602,617	N/A

=== 1994 Sri Lankan Parliamentary Election ===
Party	Galigamuwa		Kegalle Electoral District		Sri Lanka	
Party	Votes	%	Votes	%	Votes	%
PA	20,730	49.74%	190,689	47.91%	3,887,805	48.94%
UNP	20,647	49.54%	203,938	51.24%	3,498,370	44.04%
Other Parties (with < 1%)	300	0.72%	3,383	0.85%	90,078	1.13%
Valid Votes	41,677	96.06%	398,010	95.89%	7,943,688	95.20%
Rejected Votes	1,709	3.94%	17,043	4.11%	400,395	4.80%
Total Polled	43,386	80.28%	415,053	80.78%	8,344,095	74.75%
Registered Electors	54,044		513,825		11,163,064	

=== 1989 Sri Lankan Parliamentary Election ===
Party	Galigamuwa		Kegalle Electoral District		Sri Lanka	
Party	Votes	%	Votes	%	Votes	%
UNP	16,931	59.69%	174,334	61.12%	2,838,005	50.71%
SLFP	10,311	36.35%	80,668	28.28%	1,785,369	31.90%
USA	637	2.25%	15,168	5.32%	141,983	2.54%
ELJP	393	1.39%	14,056	4.93%	67,723	1.21%
Other Parties (with < 1%)	91	0.32%	1,028	0.36%	90,480	1.62%
Valid Votes	28,363	94.88%	285,254	93.95%	5,596,468	93.87%
Rejected Votes	1,530	5.12%	18,362	6.05%	365,563	6.13%
Total Polled	29,893	63.18%	303,616	69.46%	5,962,031	63.60%
Registered Electors	47,312		437,131		9,374,164	

== Demographics ==
=== Ethnicity ===
The Galigamuwa Polling Division has a Sinhalese majority (94.5%) . In comparison, the Kegalle Electoral District (which contains the Galigamuwa Polling Division) has a Sinhalese majority (85.5%)

Ethnicity in Galigamuwa
1. Sinhalese (94.5%)
2. Indian Tamil (3.20%)
3. Moor (1.50%)
4. Other (0.80%)

=== Religion ===
The Galigamuwa Polling Division has a Buddhist majority (94.0%) . In comparison, the Kegalle Electoral District (which contains the Galigamuwa Polling Division) has a Buddhist majority (84.4%)

Religion in Galigamuwa
1. Buddhist (94.0%)
2. Hindu (3.30%)
3. Muslim (1.60%)
4. Other (1.10%)
