= Champika Premadasa =

Sri Lankan politician

Hon. Champika Premadasa MP

Member of Parliament for Kegalle District
- Incumbent
- Assumed office 2000

Personal details
- Born: November 4, 1948 (age 77)
- Party: United National Party

Abathenna Devayalage Champika Premadasa (born November 4, 1948) is a Sri Lankan politician and a member of the Parliament of Sri Lanka. He was elected from Kegalle District in 2000. He is a member of the United National Party.
