= Sujith Sanjaya Perera =

Sri Lankan politician

Hon. Sujith Sanjaya Perera MP
- සුජිත් සංජය පෙරේරා சுஜித் சஞ்சய பெரேரா

Member of Parliament for Kegalle District
- Incumbent
- Assumed office 2015

Personal details
- Party: Samagi Jana Balawegaya
- Other political affiliations: United National Party
- Education: Nalanda College, Colombo

Sujith Sanjaya Perera is a Sri Lankan politician and member of the Parliament of Sri Lanka. He was elected from Kegalle District in 2015 as a candidate of the United National Party . He is the son of Vincent Perera.

He was educated at Nalanda College, Colombo
