= Kegalle Electoral District =

Electoral district in Sri Lanka

Kegalle
- Electoral District for the Parliament of Sri Lanka
- Administrative District: Kegalle
- Province: Sabaragamuwa
- Polling divisions: 9
- Population: 807,000 (2008)
- Electorate: 613,938 (2010)
- Area: 1,693 km^{2} (654 sq mi)

Current Electoral District
- Number of members: 9
- MPs: NPP (7) Dammika Patabendi; Kosala Jayaweera; Sagarika Athauda; Manoj Rajapaksha; Nandana Millagala; Kanchana Welipitiya; Nanda Bandara SJB (2) Kabir Hashim; Sujith Sanjaya Perera

Kegalle electoral district is one of the 22 multi-member electoral districts of Sri Lanka created by the 1978 Constitution of Sri Lanka. The district is conterminous with the administrative district of Kegalle in the Sabaragamuwa province. The district currently elects 9 of the 225 members of the Sri Lankan Parliament and had 613,938 registered electors in 2010. The district is Sri Lanka's Electorate Number 22.

== Polling Divisions ==
The Kegalle Electoral District consists of the following polling divisions:

A: Dedigama

B: Galigamuwa

C: Kegalle

D: Rambukkana

E: Mawanella

F: Aranayake

G: Yatiyantota

H: Ruwanwella

I. Deraniyagala

== 1982 Presidential Election ==
Results of the 1st presidential election held on 20 October 1982 for the district:

Candidate	Party	Votes per Polling Division									Postal Votes	Total Votes	%
Candidate	Party	Arana -yake	Dedi- gama	Derani- yagala	Gali- gamuwa	Kegalle	Mawa- nella	Rambuk -kana	Ruwan- wella	Yatiy- antota	Postal Votes	Total Votes	%
Junius Jayewardene	UNP	17,183	26,926	19,249	19,599	20,184	24,108	19,130	22,645	22,889	3,531	195,444	57.02%
Hector Kobbekaduwa	SLFP	10,433	18,803	11,997	15,842	14,567	13,814	13,220	13,749	12,517	1,596	126,538	36.92%
Rohana Wijeweera	JVP	1,197	2,201	1,371	1,477	1,506	1,945	1,799	1,198	862	150	13,706	4.00%
Colvin R. de Silva	LSSP	154	432	789	403	384	219	168	1,683	1,838	114	6,184	1.80%
Vasudeva Nanayakkara	NSSP	29	41	104	54	63	51	21	72	69	10	514	0.15%
Kumar Ponnambalam	ACTC	26	45	66	32	31	29	17	52	78	0	376	0.11%
Valid Votes		29,022	48,448	33,576	37,407	36,735	40,166	34,355	39,399	38,253	5,401	342,762	100.00%
Rejected Votes		219	538	572	490	443	275	328	856	771	45	4,537	
Total Polled		29,241	48,986	34,148	37,897	37,178	40,441	34,683	40,255	39,024	5,446	347,299	
Registered Electors		34,504	57,629	40,531	45,109	45,146	48,873	41,612	47,333	45,811		406,548	
Turnout		84.75%	85.00%	84.25%	84.01%	82.35%	82.75%	83.35%	85.05%	85.18%		85.43%	

== 1988 Presidential Election ==
Results of the 2nd presidential election held on 19 December 1988 for the district:

Candidate	Party	Votes per Polling Division									Postal Votes	Total Votes	%
Candidate	Party	Arana -yake	Dedi- gama	Derani- yagala	Gali- gamuwa	Kegalle	Mawa- nella	Rambuk -kana	Ruwan- wella	Yatiy- antota	Postal Votes	Total Votes	%
Ranasinghe Premadasa	UNP	14,894	20,951	17,649	16,732	15,167	22,423	16,033	21,282	21,614	1,975	168,720	57.11%
Sirimavo Bandaranaike	SLFP	9,605	15,046	11,008	14,160	15,226	14,094	12,490	13,249	13,452	1,439	119,769	40.54%
Oswin Abeygunasekara	SLMP	335	587	595	580	694	535	535	1,674	1,253	135	6,923	2.34%
Valid Votes		24,834	36,584	29,252	31,472	31,087	37,052	29,058	36,205	36,319	3,549	295,412	100.00%
Rejected Votes		369	396	438	570	474	452	411	542	516	109	4,277	
Total Polled		25,203	36,980	29,690	32,042	31,561	37,504	29,469	36,747	36,835	3,658	299,689	
Registered Electors		37,459	61,669	43,740	48,269	48,217	55,270	43,847	50,045	48,662		437,178	
Turnout		67.28%	59.97%	67.88%	66.38%	65.46%	67.86%	67.21%	73.43%	75.70%		68.55%	

== 1989 Parliamentary General Election ==
Results of the 9th parliamentary election held on 15 February 1989 for the district:

Party	Votes per Polling Division									Postal Votes	Total Votes	%	Seats
Party	Arana -yake	Dedi- gama	Derani- yagala	Gali- gamuwa	Kegalle	Mawa- nella	Rambuk -kana	Ruwan- wella	Yatiy- antota	Postal Votes	Total Votes	%	Seats
United National Party / Ceylon Workers' Congress	16,302	23,006	15,959	16,931	16,984	20,193	13,525	22,644	24,062	4,728	174,334	61.12%	6
Sri Lanka Freedom Party	8,682	13,722	7,421	10,311	11,304	9,066	6,803	4,828	6,377	2,154	80,668	28.28%	2
United Socialist Alliance (CPSL, LSSP, NSSP, SLMP)	171	508	1,101	637	685	235	362	6,865	4,248	356	15,168	5.32%	1
United Lanka People's Party	479	6,834	202	393	680	3,831	633	393	305	306	14,056	4.93%	0
Mahajana Eksath Peramuna	68	70	133	91	153	113	86	142	112	60	1,028	0.36%	0
Valid Votes	25,702	44,140	24,816	28,363	29,806	33,438	21,409	34,872	35,104	7,604	285,254	100.00%	9
Rejected Votes	2,191	2,629	1,999	1,530	1,689	2,375	1,361	1,822	2,573	193	18,362		
Total Polled	27,893	46,769	26,815	29,893	31,495	35,813	22,770	36,694	37,677	7,797	303,616		
Registered Electors	36,713	60,616	43,230	47,312	46,828	54,137	42,695	49,325	48,126	8,149	437,131		
Turnout	75.98%	77.16%	62.03%	63.18%	67.26%	66.15%	53.33%	74.39%	78.29%	95.68%	69.46%		

The following candidates were elected: Maha Maya Samanthadevi Karunaratne (UNP), 50,779 preference votes (pv); Kasedoruge Vincent Perera (UNP), 42,237 pv; Dharmadeva Jayasinghe (UNP), 42,170 pv; Yunoos Lebbe Mohamed Farook (UNP), 38,857 pv; Chandradasa Ranatunga (UNP), 29,051 pv; Mano Wijeyeratne (UNP), 28,065 pv; Dharmasiri Senanayake (SLFP), 24,715 pv; Balasooriya Arachchilage Balasooriya Jagath (SLFP), 23,088 pv; and Athauda Seneviratne (USA), 10,792 pv.

== 1994 Parliamentary General Election ==
Results of the 10th parliamentary election held on 16 August 1994 for the district:

Party	Votes per Polling Division									Postal Votes	Total Votes	%	Seats
Party	Arana -yake	Dedi- gama	Derani- yagala	Gali- gamuwa	Kegalle	Mawa- nella	Rambuk -kana	Ruwan- wella	Yatiy- antota	Postal Votes	Total Votes	%	Seats
United National Party / Ceylon Workers' Congress	17,392	28,357	23,725	20,647	18,311	25,921	17,976	22,082	24,145	5,382	203,938	51.24%	5
People's Alliance (SLFP et al.)	15,383	26,678	16,305	20,730	23,084	21,814	19,346	21,536	19,340	6,473	190,689	47.91%	4
Sri Lanka Progressive Front (JVP)	304	434	253	300	543	452	469	289	202	137	3,383	0.85%	0
Valid Votes	33,079	55,469	40,283	41,677	41,938	48,187	37,791	43,907	43,687	11,992	398,010	100.00%	9
Rejected Votes	1,406	1,845	2,125	1,709	1,624	2,010	1,560	1,910	2,604	250	17,043		
Total Polled	34,485	57,314	42,408	43,386	43,562	50,197	39,351	45,817	46,291	12,242	415,053		
Registered Electors	42,338	70,142	52,714	54,044	54,933	63,001	49,996	56,451	57,328		500,947		
Turnout	81.45%	81.71%	80.45%	80.28%	79.30%	79.68%	78.71%	81.16%	80.75%		82.85%		

The following candidates were elected: P.B.G. Kalugalla (PA), 73,369 preference votes (pv); Herath Ralalage Jayathileke Podinilame (UNP), 67,190 pv; Balasooriya Arachchilage Balasooriya Jagath (PA), 59,017 pv; Mahipala Herath (PA), 52,221 pv; Mano Wijeyeratne (UNP), 51,531 pv; Athauda Seneviratne (PA), 50,775 pv; R.A.D. Sirisena (UNP), 50,690 pv; Yunoos Lebbe Mohamed Farook (UNP), 47,765 pv; and Kasedoruge Vincent Perera (UNP), 45,884 pv.

== 1994 Presidential Election ==
Results of the 3rd presidential election held on 9 November 1994 for the district:

Candidate	Party	Votes per Polling Division									Postal Votes	Total Votes	%
Candidate	Party	Arana -yake	Dedi- gama	Derani- yagala	Gali- gamuwa	Kegalle	Mawa- nella	Rambuk -kana	Ruwan- wella	Yatiy- antota	Postal Votes	Total Votes	%
Chandrika Kumaratunga	PA	17,156	28,939	18,793	22,942	24,126	25,400	21,224	23,340	21,930	7,826	211,676	56.06%
Srimathi Dissanayake	UNP	13,854	22,989	18,179	16,086	14,150	19,367	13,899	18,038	18,200	4,945	159,707	42.30%
Hudson Samarasinghe	Ind 2	224	329	375	307	197	350	259	298	409	11	2,759	0.73%
Harischandra Wijayatunga	SMBP	113	159	131	132	140	209	144	137	180	57	1,402	0.37%
Nihal Galappaththi	SLPF	107	134	94	104	115	101	110	119	110	34	1,028	0.27%
A.J. Ranashinge	Ind 1	78	133	128	98	87	143	84	131	123	15	1,020	0.27%
Valid Votes		31,532	52,683	37,700	39,669	38,815	45,570	35,720	42,063	40,952	12,888	377,592	100.00%
Rejected Votes		604	795	915	696	751	803	761	602	992	220	7,139	
Total Polled		32,136	53,478	38,615	40,365	39,566	46,373	36,481	42,665	41,944	13,108	384,731	
Registered Electors		42,338	70,142	52,714	54,044	54,933	63,001	49,996	56,451	57,328		500,947	
Turnout		75.90%	76.24%	73.25%	74.69%	72.03%	73.61%	72.97%	75.58%	73.16%		76.80%	

== 1999 Provincial Council Election ==
Results of the 3rd Sabaragamuwa provincial council election held on 6 April 1999 for the district:

Party	Votes	%	Seats
People's Alliance (SLFP, SLMC et al.)	165,041	47.70%	
United National Party	158,503	45.81%	
Janatha Vimukthi Peramuna	15,537	4.49%	
National Union of Workers (CWC, DWC)	4,351	1.26%	
Mahajana Eksath Peramuna	1,552	0.45%	
Liberal Party	983	0.28%	
Valid Votes	345,967	100.00%	
Rejected Votes	23,749		
Total Polled	369,716		
Registered Electors	528,107		
Turnout	70.01%		

== 1999 Presidential Election ==
Results of the 4th presidential election held on 21 December 1999 for the district:

Candidate	Party	Votes per Polling Division									Postal Votes	Total Votes	%
Candidate	Party	Arana -yake	Dedi- gama	Derani- yagala	Gali- gamuwa	Kegalle	Mawa- nella	Rambuk -kana	Ruwan- wella	Yatiy- antota	Postal Votes	Total Votes	%
Chandrika Kumaratunga	PA	18,314	28,307	19,771	21,032	23,670	24,279	22,909	23,868	22,655	5,380	210,185	51.30%
Ranil Wickremasinghe	UNP	14,224	25,324	19,062	18,227	16,407	23,730	15,635	19,546	19,765	4,456	176,376	43.05%
Nandana Gunathilake	JVP	1,232	2,005	1,202	1,670	2,314	1,938	1,740	1,337	902	657	14,997	3.66%
Harischandra Wijayatunga	SMBP	117	189	146	206	259	232	204	109	162	106	1,730	0.42%
W.V.M. Ranjith	Ind 2	99	125	201	134	105	150	112	135	195	6	1,262	0.31%
Rajiva Wijesinha	Liberal	101	122	205	127	104	138	97	129	184	2	1,209	0.30%
T. Edirisuriya	Ind 1	78	129	179	106	121	115	118	108	173	7	1,134	0.28%
Abdul Rasool	SLMP	63	110	66	70	61	245	52	60	78	9	814	0.20%
Vasudeva Nanayakkara	LDA	34	51	75	67	85	72	65	101	97	56	703	0.17%
Kamal Karunadasa	PLSF	44	61	57	51	39	52	56	49	68	4	481	0.12%
Hudson Samarasinghe	Ind 3	28	66	45	47	32	47	39	45	66	1	416	0.10%
A.W. Premawardhana	PFF	13	21	27	24	21	23	22	16	36	1	204	0.05%
A. Dissanayaka	DUNF	10	23	20	20	22	19	16	26	12	1	169	0.04%
Valid Votes		34,357	56,533	41,056	41,781	43,240	51,040	41,065	45,529	44,393	10,686	409,680	100.00%
Rejected Votes		749	1,065	801	750	924	943	809	725	998	372	8,136	
Total Polled		35,106	57,598	41,857	42,531	44,164	51,983	41,874	46,254	45,391	11,058	417,816	
Registered Electors		46,078	74,291	54,448	57,224	59,084	69,783	54,323	59,827	59,922		534,980	
Turnout		76.19%	77.53%	76.88%	74.32%	74.75%	74.49%	77.08%	77.31%	75.75%		78.10%	

== 2000 Parliamentary General Election ==
Results of the 11th parliamentary election held on 10 October 2000 for the district:

Party	Votes per Polling Division									Postal Votes	Total Votes	%	Seats
Party	Arana -yake	Dedi- gama	Derani- yagala	Gali- gamuwa	Kegalle	Mawa- nella	Rambuk -kana	Ruwan- wella	Yatiy- antota	Postal Votes	Total Votes	%	Seats
People's Alliance (SLFP et al.)	18,340	25,961	19,715	20,284	22,237	19,976	20,907	23,375	22,659	7,660	201,114	48.88%	5
United National Party	14,160	25,938	18,443	18,109	16,091	23,751	16,647	18,298	18,738	5,452	175,627	42.69%	4
Janatha Vimukthi Peramuna	1,688	3,153	1,848	2,468	3,509	2,428	2,356	2,196	1,347	1,035	22,028	5.35%	0
National Unity Alliance (SLMC)	226	629	20	146	142	2,901	147	215	331	40	4,797	1.17%	0
Sinhala Heritage	164	678	289	556	740	452	461	628	306	275	4,549	1.11%	0
Independent 4	43	49	78	47	45	58	31	69	76	1	497	0.12%	0
Muslim United Liberation Front	28	42	34	24	39	156	26	63	49	3	464	0.11%	0
Citizen's Front	46	42	45	20	59	93	49	33	28	7	422	0.10%	0
Liberal Party	25	31	78	29	43	37	37	48	52	1	381	0.09%	0
Left & Democratic Alliance	15	13	18	6	21	10	8	50	195	8	344	0.08%	0
People's Liberation Solidarity Front	22	41	33	40	41	38	22	23	25	15	300	0.07%	0
Sinhalaye Mahasammatha Bhoomiputra Pakshaya	13	51	21	19	40	39	31	33	13	29	289	0.07%	0
Democratic United National Front	21	34	36	29	26	30	35	28	32	2	273	0.07%	0
Sri Lanka Progressive Front	7	8	8	9	8	9	7	6	10	1	73	0.02%	0
Independent 3	6	7	8	4	9	9	7	4	8	2	64	0.02%	0
National Development Front	5	11	9	4	3	9	6	9	5	0	61	0.01%	0
People's Freedom Front	1	7	6	5	2	9	4	5	5	1	45	0.01%	0
Independent 1	3	3	6	4	5	3	2	7	9	2	44	0.01%	0
Independent 2	2	2	12	4	3	1	4	6	5	1	40	0.01%	0
Valid Votes	34,815	56,700	40,707	41,807	43,063	50,009	40,787	45,096	43,893	14,535	411,412	100.00%	9
Rejected Votes	1,847	2,710	2,833	2,386	2,241	2,840	2,030	2,599	2,960	282	22,728		
Total Polled	36,662	59,410	43,540	44,193	45,304	52,849	42,817	47,695	46,853	14,817	434,140		
Registered Electors	46,852	75,475	55,567	58,109	60,082	71,439	55,564	60,851	61,299		545,238		
Turnout	78.25%	78.71%	78.36%	76.05%	75.40%	73.98%	77.06%	78.38%	76.43%		79.62%		

The following candidates were elected: Athauda Seneviratne (PA), 76,510 preference votes (pv); Mahipala Herath (PA), 61,625 pv; Ranjith Siyambalapitiya (PA), 49,582 pv; Herath Ralalage Jayathileke Podinilame (UNP), 48,504 pv; A. D. Champika Premadasa (UNP), 47,342 pv; Balasooriya Arachchilage Balasooriya Jagath (PA), 45,862 pv; Rupasinghe Arachchige Don Sirisena (UNP), 43,002 pv; Mano Wijeyeratne (UNP), 41,069 pv; and Lalith Dissanayake (PA), 40,624 pv.

== 2001 Parliamentary General Election ==
Results of the 12th parliamentary election held on 5 December 2001 for the district:

Party	Votes per Polling Division									Postal Votes	Total Votes	%	Seats
Party	Arana -yake	Dedi- gama	Derani- yagala	Gali- gamuwa	Kegalle	Mawa- nella	Rambuk -kana	Ruwan- wella	Yatiy- antota	Postal Votes	Total Votes	%	Seats
United National Front (UNP, SLMC, CWC, WPF)	18,044	29,259	20,383	20,569	19,242	30,845	19,972	21,298	22,704		208,104	49.36%	5
People's Alliance (SLFP et al.)	12,263	23,109	16,528	18,619	19,454	17,641	17,068	20,574	19,508		170,901	40.53%	3
Janatha Vimukthi Peramuna	3,161	5,515	3,148	3,736	5,415	4,116	3,454	3,820	2,678		36,711	8.71%	1
New Left Front (NSSP et al.)	175	284	392	236	244	244	203	333	391		2,514	0.60%	0
Sinhala Heritage	105	191	133	182	389	408	232	223	87		2,046	0.49%	0
United Sinhala Great Council	29	43	61	40	37	42	36	51	58		399	0.09%	0
Liberal Party	8	20	30	12	30	20	17	20	27		185	0.04%	0
People's Freedom Front	12	22	24	19	15	10	16	22	20		161	0.04%	0
Sinhalaye Mahasammatha Bhoomiputra Pakshaya	14	16	10	10	18	16	28	15	9		144	0.03%	0
Independent 4	10	20	19	8	8	23	20	12	16		137	0.03%	0
Independent 1	8	8	18	7	7	10	7	9	16		92	0.02%	0
National Development Front	11	4	8	10	8	16	10	10	7		85	0.02%	0
Independent 3	6	8	11	9	9	4	3	4	5		59	0.01%	0
Independent 2	6	6	7	5	4	3	12	6	5		54	0.01%	0
Sri Lanka Progressive Front	5	10	3	1	9	5	7	4	4		48	0.01%	0
Valid Votes	33,857	58,515	40,775	43,463	44,889	53,403	41,085	46,401	45,535		421,640	100.00%	9
Rejected Votes	1,827	2,527	3,014	2,217	2,057	2,560	2,045	2,594	3,521		22,669		
Total Polled	35,684	61,042	43,789	45,680	46,946	55,963	43,130	48,995	49,056		444,309		
Registered Electors	47,648	76,475	56,143	59,001	61,324	73,064	56,580	61,914	62,548		554,697		
Turnout	74.89%	79.82%	78.00%	77.42%	76.55%	76.59%	76.23%	79.13%	78.43%		80.10%		

The following candidates were elected: Rukman Senanayake (UNF), 73,594 preference votes (pv); Mahipala Herath (PA), 70,934 pv; A. D. Champika Premadasa (UNF), 57,249 pv; Athauda Seneviratne (PA), 56,299 pv; Kabir Hashim (UNF), 53,406 pv; Ranjith Siyambalapitiya (PA), 49,298 pv; Herath Ralalage Jayathileke Podinilame (UNF), 46,769 pv; Rupasinghe Arachchige Don Sirisena (UNF), 44,627 pv; and R. M. Gamini Rathnayake (JVP), 3,691 pv.

== 2004 Parliamentary General Election ==
Results of the 13th parliamentary election held on 2 April 2004 for the district:

Party	Votes per Polling Division									Postal Votes	Total Votes	%	Seats
Party	Arana -yake	Dedi- gama	Derani- yagala	Gali- gamuwa	Kegalle	Mawa- nella	Rambuk -kana	Ruwan- wella	Yatiy- antota	Postal Votes	Total Votes	%	Seats
United People's Freedom Alliance (SLFP, JVP et al.)	16,911	28,964	20,436	22,980	23,778	23,290	22,187	24,746	22,081	8,894	214,267	50.88%	5
United National Front (UNP, SLMC, CWC, WPF)	15,321	26,328	18,881	18,693	17,509	26,099	16,858	19,950	21,500	5,502	186,641	44.32%	4
Jathika Hela Urumaya	1,458	2,095	824	1,715	2,834	3,151	2,256	1,760	1,083	858	18,034	4.28%	0
National Development Front	40		42	36	71	89	41	83	46	4	488*	0.12%	0
United Socialist Party	46		70	44	37	66	20	50	74	3	487*	0.12%	0
United Muslim People's Party	39		44	39	18	82	23	29	43	2	356*	0.08%	0
New Left Front (NSSP et al.)	12		27	18	28	32	22	56	87	9	307*	0.07%	0
Independent 9	8		15	7	7	9	11	5	15	0	87*	0.02%	0
Sinhalaye Mahasammatha Bhoomiputra Pakshaya	0		7	6	4	3	13	5	1	6	85*	0.02%	0
Sri Lanka Muslim Party	2		1	7	2	8	3	52	6	2	85*	0.02%	0
Independent 5	4		1	2	2	8	23	2	3	0	47*	0.01%	0
Independent 8	2		11	1	1	1	3	3	7	1	35*	0.01%	0
Independent 1	3		5	1	0	3	1	4	6	0	29*	0.01%	0
Sri Lanka National Front	1		1	2	2	3	1	7	2	0	26*	0.01%	0
Independent 7	1		4	6	0	9	1	1	2	0	26*	0.01%	0
Independent 3	1		6	2	3	5	1	2	2	0	25*	0.01%	0
Liberal Party	2		4	1	5	5	2	0	0	0	21*	0.00%	0
Sri Lanka Progressive Front	2		1	2	0	3	3	2	1	1	20*	0.00%	0
Ruhuna People's Party	4		2	0	0	3	2	4	2	0	20*	0.00%	0
Independent 2	3		2	0	1	2	4	1	1	0	16*	0.00%	0
Independent 4	1		3	2	1	3	1	0	2	0	15*	0.00%	0
Independent 6	1		0	1	4	0	1	1	2	0	14*	0.00%	0
Valid Votes	33,862	57,630*	40,387	43,565	44,307	52,874	41,477	46,763	44,966	15,282	421,131*	100.00%	9
Rejected Votes	2,032	3130	3,584	2,373	2,276	2,853	2,316	2,880	3,910	329	25,685*		
Total Polled	35,894	60,760	43,971	45,938	46,583	55,727	43,793	49,643	48,876	15,611	446,816*		
Registered Electors	48,731	78,357	57,117	60,550	62561	76,115	58,588	64,110	64,170		570,299		
Turnout	73.66%	77.54%	76.98%	75.87%	74.46%	73.21%	74.75%	77.43%	76.17%		78.35%		

The following candidates were elected: R. M. Gamini Rathnayake (UPFA-JVP), 90,070 preference votes (pv); Anuruddha Polgampola (UPFA-JVP), 84,981 pv; Ranjith Siyambalapitiya (UPFA-SLFP), 80,485 pv; Mahipala Herath (UPFA-SLFP), 71,682 pv; Kabir Hashim (UNF-UNP), 69,372 pv; Athauda Seneviratne (UPFA-SLFP), 53,892 pv; A. D. Champika Premadasa (UNF-UNP), 44,391 pv; Mano Wijeyeratne (UNF-UNP), 44,272 pv; and Rukman Senanayake (UNF-UNP), 43,630 pv.

Mahipala Herath (UPFA-SLFP) resigned on 27 May 2004 to contest the Sabaragamuwa provincial council elections. His replacement H. R. Mithrapala (UPFA-SLFP) was sworn in on 20 July 2004.

Anuruddha Polgampola (UPFA-JVP) resigned on 3 September 2008. His replacement Lalith Dissanayake (UPFA-SLFP) was sworn in on 12 September 2008.

== 2004 Provincial Council Election ==
Results of the 4th Sabaragamuwa provincial council election held on 10 July 2004 for the district:

Party	Votes per Polling Division									Postal Votes	Total Votes	%	Seats
Party	Arana -yake	Dedi- gama	Derani- yagala	Gali- gamuwa	Kegalle	Mawa- nella	Rambuk -kana	Ruwan- wella	Yatiy- antota	Postal Votes	Total Votes	%	Seats
United People's Freedom Alliance (SLFP, JVP et al.)	17,805	24,192	16,738	19,539	20,547	21,603	20,123	19,876	19,208	5,481	185,112	58.90%	11
United National Party	9,148	16,727	10,755	12,278	10,796	14,679	10,057	15,405	13,104	2,602	115,551	36.77%	7
Sri Lanka Muslim Congress	603	967	13	79	110	4,146	208	337	287	20	6,770	2.15%	0
Ceylon Workers' Congress	6	259	1,469	110	54	30	6	470	1,873	18	4,295	1.37%	0
United Socialist Party	40	390	55	46	41	42	44	64	74	2	798	0.25%	0
United Lalith Front	56	75	70	49	49	75	49	76	81	4	584	0.19%	0
National Development Front	48	41	51	35	55	54	50	50	37	2	423	0.13%	0
Independent 3	15	22	46	18	6	20	16	26	28	4	201	0.06%	0
Sinhalaye Mahasammatha Bhoomiputra Pakshaya	6	15	16	12	23	28	23	11	6	18	158	0.05%	0
United Sinhala Great Council	3	8	11	6	9	10	7	14	6	10	84	0.03%	0
Democratic United National Front	5	2	21	5	11	5	3	10	18	0	80	0.03%	0
Independent 2	13	5	11	4	6	9	10	13	8	1	80	0.03%	0
Sri Lanka Progressive Front	9	3	5	1	4	20	5	5	11	0	63	0.02%	0
Independent 1	6	7	10	4	6	5	4	4	9	3	58	0.02%	0
Ruhuna People's Party	4	3	2	4	3	3	2	4	14	0	39	0.01%	0
Valid Votes	27,767	42,716	29,273	32,190	31,720	40,729	30,607	36,365	34,764	8,165	314,296	100.00%	18
Rejected Votes	1,689	2,251	2,476	2,038	1,810	2,346	1,976	2,033	2,732	428	19,779		
Total Polled	29,456	44,967	31,749	34,228	33,530	43,075	32,583	38,398	37,496	8,593	334,075		
Registered Electors	48,731	78,357	57,117	60,550	62,561	76,115	58,588	64,110	64,170		570,299		
Turnout	60.45%	57.39%	55.59%	56.53%	53.60%	56.59%	55.61%	59.89%	58.43%		58.58%		

The following candidates were elected: Mahipala Herath (UPFA-SLFP), 85,365 preference votes (pv); M. A. Kamal Nandasena Pemasiri (UPFA), 35,546 pv; Lalith Dissanayake (UPFA), 30,287 pv; Y. G. Padmasiri (UPFA), 29,243 pv; Herath Ralalage Jayathilleke Podinilame (UNP), 25,946 pv; Sri Lal Wickramasinghe (UPFA), 23,004 pv; N. G. Priyantha Ranjith Kumar (UPFA), 22,479 pv; Ananda Millangoda (UPFA), 22,030 pv; Kasadoruge Sujitha Sanjaya Perera (UNP), 20,641 pv; Udayakantha Gunathilaka (UPFA), 20,419 pv; Thusitha Wijemanne (UNP), 20,359 pv; R. A. Darmapala Rajapaksha (UPFA), 19,942 pv; D. P. Sisira Kumara Sarathchandra (UPFA), 19,595 pv; D. A. Buddhisena (UPFA), 19,542 pv; Wedikkarayalage Somadasa (UNP), 17,096 pv; Nihal Farook (UNP), 15,736 pv; Lakshman Kodikara (UNP), 15,169 pv; and M. D. Siril Gunarathne Pallepola (UNP), 14,817 pv.

== 2005 Presidential Election ==
Results of the 5th presidential election held on 17 November 2005 for the district:

Candidate	Party	Votes per Polling Division									Postal Votes	Total Votes	%
Candidate	Party	Arana -yake	Dedi- gama	Derani- yagala	Gali- gamuwa	Kegalle	Mawa- nella	Rambuk -kana	Ruwan- wella	Yatiy- antota	Postal Votes	Total Votes	%
Mahinda Rajapaksa	UPFA	18,391	32,231	22,653	25,086	27,444	25,701	24,559	26,522	25,080	11,517	239,184	51.02%
Ranil Wickremasinghe	UNP	18,906	30,391	22,087	21,875	20,451	32,203	20,078	24,684	26,056	6,752	223,483	47.67%
Siritunga Jayasuriya	USP	179	176	272	198	150	220	139	224	242	4	1,804	0.38%
A.A. Suraweera	NDF	121	125	248	154	123	194	121	175	190	6	1,457	0.31%
Victor Hettigoda	ULPP	53	84	69	60	73	111	82	70	60	45	707	0.15%
Chamil Jayaneththi	NLF	40	47	51	55	46	60	38	46	48	6	437	0.09%
Wimal Geeganage	SLNF	42	57	52	57	31	49	33	42	32	5	400	0.09%
Aruna de Soyza	RPP	33	52	36	37	36	45	30	52	48	6	375	0.08%
Anura De Silva	ULF	30	50	37	39	33	52	37	36	41	0	355	0.08%
A.K.J. Arachchige	DUA	22	36	23	21	19	33	25	24	25	3	231	0.05%
Wije Dias	SEP	7	14	21	19	16	15	19	16	24	1	152	0.03%
P. Nelson Perera	SLPF	17	10	18	10	10	17	11	9	15	0	117	0.02%
H.S. Dharmadwaja	UNAF	5	10	6	5	6	9	6	9	13	2	71	0.02%
Valid Votes		37,846	63,283	45,573	47,616	48,438	58,709	45,178	51,909	51,874	18,347	468,773	100.00%
Rejected Votes		434	613	526	443	421	602	496	481	536	243	4,795	
Total Polled		38,280	63,896	46,099	48,059	48,859	59,311	45,674	52,390	52,410	18,590	473,568	
Registered Electors		49,586	80,201	58,163	61,932	63,755	78,208	59,711	65,989	65,737		583,282	
Turnout		77.20%	79.67%	79.26%	77.60%	76.64%	75.84%	76.49%	79.39%	79.73%		81.19%	

== 2008 Provincial Council Election ==
Results of the 5th Sabaragamuwa provincial council election held on 23 August 2008 for the district:

Party	Votes per Polling Division									Postal Votes	Total Votes	%	Seats
Party	Arana -yake	Dedi- gama	Derani- yagala	Gali- gamuwa	Kegalle	Mawa- nella	Rambuk -kana	Ruwan- wella	Yatiy- antota	Postal Votes	Total Votes	%	Seats
United People's Freedom Alliance (SLFP et al.)	18,729	28,797	18,659	22,741	24,809*	23,641	22,419	23,102	22,731	6,943	212,571*	55.48%	10
United National Party	12,215	21,587	14,931	15,381	13,881	22,348	13,245	18,808	19,239	2,690	154,325	40.28%	7
Janatha Vimukthi Peramuna	653	1,443	925	1,060	1,408	808	1,077	1,051	546	394	9,365	2.44%	1
Ceylon Workers' Congress	91	281	1,279	126	68	1,849	12	382	913	27	5,028	1.31%	0
United National Alliance	58	81	61	75	54	90	53	89	98	15	674	0.18%	0
United Socialist Party	30	63	41	35	30	52	38	59	60	4	412	0.11%	0
National Development Front	14	15	36	12	11	31	20	37	24	3	203	0.05%	0
Independent 10	14	15	17	13	11	5	6	13	9	5	108	0.03%	0
Left Front (NSSP et al.)	0	15	6	8	5	3	5	8	13	3	66	0.02%	0
United Lanka Great Council	6	5	12	4	8	3	8	7	3	1	57	0.01%	0
Independent 8	6	4	6	3	8	3	6	6	5	1	48	0.01%	0
Independent 9	5	3	7	0	9	3	8	5	4	3	47	0.01%	0
Independent 3	4	2	7	4	6	7	10	4	1	1	46	0.01%	0
Independent 1	0	1	9	1	2	10	1	4	6	0	34	0.01%	0
Independent 5	1	3	2	5	8	1	4	4	2	0	30	0.01%	0
Independent 7	3	2	6	2	5	7	1	2	1	1	30	0.01%	0
Independent 2	4	2	4	2	2	0	2	4	1	0	21	0.01%	0
Ruhuna People's Party	0	2	3	0	2	4	2	5	1	0	19	0.00%	0
Independent 6	1	6	0	0	2	4	2	3	1	0	19	0.00%	0
Independent 4	2	0	2	0	4	1	3	2	3	1	18	0.00%	0
Sri Lanka Progressive Front	1	1	1	2	1	1	2	2	0	0	11	0.00%	0
Valid Votes	31,837	52,328	36,014	39,474	40,334*	48,871	36,924	43,597	43,661	10,092	383,132*	100.00%	18
Rejected Votes	1,609	2,285	2,823	1,916	2,095	2,729	1,986	2,728	3,023	334	21,528		
Total Polled	33,446	54,613	38,837	41,390	42,429*	51,600	38,910	46,325	46,684	10,426	404,660*		
Registered Electors	51,025	82,630	60,518	63,819	66,367	81,844	61,544	69,082	68,792		605,621		
Turnout	65.55%	66.09%	64.17%	64.86%	63.93%*	63.05%	63.22%	67.06%	67.86%		66.82%*		

== 2010 Presidential Election ==
Results of the 6th presidential election held on 26 January 2010 for the district:

Candidate	Party	Votes per Polling Division									Postal Votes	Total Votes	%
Candidate	Party	Arana -yake	Dedi- gama	Derani- yagala	Gali- gamuwa	Kegalle	Mawa- nella	Rambuk -kana	Ruwan- wella	Yatiy- antota	Postal Votes	Total Votes	%
Mahinda Rajapaksa	UPFA	23,204	39,736	28,460	30,980	33,129	32,335	29,864	33,145	31,456	14,330	296,639	61.80%
Sarath Fonseka	NDF	13,469	23,097	16,461	16,077	15,791	27,039	15,967	19,819	20,346	6,811	174,877	36.44%
M.C.M. Ismail	DUNF	177	128	164	136	127	133	131	140	217	24	1,377	0.29%
A.A. Suraweera	NDF	113	174	202	146	116	134	99	163	161	4	1,312	0.27%
C.J. Sugathsiri Gamage	UDF	75	70	140	86	69	91	54	92	153	5	835	0.17%
W.V. Mahiman Ranjith	Ind 1	95	102	107	85	84	90	74	59	113	12	821	0.17%
A.S.P Liyanage	SLLP	60	71	94	86	62	86	49	50	99	4	661	0.14%
Ukkubanda Wijekoon	Ind 3	40	62	72	45	49	47	51	49	58	3	476	0.10%
Sarath Manamendra	NSH	39	44	56	43	28	70	38	23	82	1	424	0.09%
Lal Perera	ONF	47	35	55	36	34	55	40	21	68	4	395	0.08%
Siritunga Jayasuriya	USP	39	42	56	34	26	55	23	47	65	4	391	0.08%
Aithurus M. Illias	Ind 2	35	39	49	41	38	34	17	20	31	5	309	0.06%
Vikramabahu Karunaratne	LF	32	25	50	25	18	34	16	11	30	6	247	0.05%
M. K. Shivajilingam	Ind 5	19	22	36	30	20	17	15	28	58	1	246	0.05%
Wije Dias	SEP	18	15	21	20	24	16	27	16	32	2	191	0.04%
Sanath Pinnaduwa	NA	17	16	19	10	12	20	12	9	18	1	134	0.03%
Battaramulla Seelarathana	JP	19	8	30	14	8	5	6	16	21	1	128	0.03%
Aruna de Soyza	RPP	7	10	12	17	8	19	8	18	23	0	122	0.03%
Senaratna de Silva	PNF	11	10	24	6	12	11	8	11	18	0	111	0.02%
M. Mohamed Musthaffa	Ind 4	9	10	10	13	7	11	6	9	23	1	99	0.02%
M.B. Thaminimulla	ACAKO	12	9	16	9	6	18	6	13	10	0	99	0.02%
Sarath Kongahage	UNAF	6	13	11	7	6	7	6	5	8	1	70	0.01%
Valid Votes		37,543	63,738	46,145	47,946	49,674	60,327	46,517	53,764	53,090	21,220	479,964	100.00%
Rejected Votes		268	383	398	330	372	434	346	458	431	184	3,604	
Total Polled		37,811	64,121	46,543	48,276	50,046	60,761	46,863	54,222	53,521	21,404	483,568	
Registered Electors		51,391	83,554	61,507	64,565	67,118	83,066	62,325	70,448	69,964		613,938	
Turnout		73.58%	76.74%	75.67%	74.77%	74.56%	73.15%	75.19%	76.97%	76.50%		78.76%	

== 2010 Parliamentary General Election ==
Results of the 14th parliamentary election held on 8 April 2010 for the district:

Party	Votes per Polling Division									Postal Votes	Total Votes	%	Seats
Party	Arana -yake	Dedi- gama	Derani- yagala	Gali- gamuwa	Kegalle	Mawa- nella	Rambuk -kana	Ruwan- wella	Yatiy- antota	Postal Votes	Total Votes	%	Seats
United People's Freedom Alliance (SLFP, CWC et al.)	19,758	31,983	22,109	24,552	25,513	26,467	23,317	26,700	25,522	16,542	242,463	66.89%	7
United National Front (UNP, SLMC, DPF, SLFP(P))	7,396	14,331	9,204	9,423	9,106	15,476	9,545	12,640	13,404	4,400	104,925	28.95%	2
Democratic National Alliance (JVP et al.)	997	2,022	898	1,485	2,061	1,544	1,427	1,190	552	1,342	13,518	3.73%	0
National Development Front	27	28	53	23	18	39	24	36	30	9	287	0.08%	0
Sri Lanka National Front	3	1	170	8	2	22	5	28	4	13	256	0.07%	0
United Socialist Party	12	26	23	11	19	22	13	13	32	2	173	0.05%	0
Independent 8	11	11	18	14	11	12	16	11	26	5	135	0.04%	0
Independent 1	14	18	14	13	11	18	15	14	11	4	132	0.04%	0
United National Alternative Front	6	14	16	10	7	11	4	14	18	2	102	0.03%	0
United Democratic Front	9	6	6	6	8	8	14	7	10	3	77	0.02%	0
Patriotic National Front	6	1	9	6	4	4	6	6	4	2	48	0.01%	0
Sinhalaye Mahasammatha Bhoomiputra Pakshaya	3	5	4	16	2	3	6	1	1	3	44	0.01%	0
Left Liberation Front	4	2	2	4	3	6	7	4	3	0	35	0.01%	0
United Lanka Great Council	1	2	5	1	4	6	2	7	6	1	35	0.01%	0
Independent 3	3	0	14	1	0	4	2	3	5	2	34	0.01%	0
Janasetha Peramuna	1	7	3	1	6	1	0	8	1	4	32	0.01%	0
Independent 7	3	1	2	0	12	2	3	5	2	0	30	0.01%	0
Independent 5	4	5	0	0	1	5	1	6	6	0	28	0.01%	0
Independent 4	0	0	2	6	2	3	9	3	1	1	27	0.01%	0
Independent 2	2	10	0	1	4	4	1	1	2	1	26	0.01%	0
Independent 6	2	3	3	2	2	3	1	2	8	0	26	0.01%	0
Sri Lanka Labour Party	1	3	4	2	1	2	4	1	4	0	22	0.01%	0
Valid Votes	28,263	48,479	32,559	35,585	36,797	43,662	34,422	40,700	39,652	22,336	362,455	100.00%	9
Rejected Votes	1,938	3,335	3,229	2,471	2,209	2,989	2,407	2,869	3,889	629	25,965		
Total Polled	30,201	51,814	35,788	38,056	39,006	46,651	36,829	43,569	43,541	22,965	388,420		
Registered Electors	51,391	83,554	61,507	64,565	67,118	83,066	62,325	70,448	69,964		613,938		
Turnout	58.77%	62.01%	58.19%	58.94%	58.12%	56.16%	59.09%	61.85%	62.23%		63.27%		

The following candidates were elected: Ranjith Siyambalapitiya (UPFA-SLFP), 145,623 preference votes (pv); Athauda Seneviratne (UPFA-SLFP), 68,528 pv; Kanaka Herath (UPFA), 66,912 pv; Y. G. Padmasiri (UPFA), 61,685 pv; Lalith Dissanayake (UPFA-SLFP), 52,673 pv; Kabir Hashim (UNF-UNP), 48,822 pv; A. D. Champika Premadasa (UNF-UNP), 41,271 pv; Arachchilage Jagath Balasuriya (UPFA), 47,121 pv; and H. R. Mithrapala (UPFA-SLFP), 37,831 pv.
