= Bar Association of Sri Lanka =

Lawyer organization in Sri Lanka

Bar Association of Sri Lanka ශ්‍රී ලංකා නීතිඥ සංගමය
- ශ්‍රී ලංකා නීතිඥ සංගමය
- Abbreviation: BASL
- Founded: 1974; 52 years ago
- Headquarters: 153, Mihindu Mawatha, Colombo 12
- Location: Colombo, Sri Lanka
- Region served: Sri Lanka
- Official language: English, Sinhala and Tamil
- President: Rajeev Amarasuriya
- Deputy President: Rienzie Arsecularatne
- Secretary: Chathura Galhena
- Website: BASL.LK

The Bar Association of Sri Lanka (BASL) is the Bar Association in Sri Lanka, established in 1974. The institute amalgamated the Bar Council of Sri Lanka which represented the Advocates and Law Society of Sri Lanka which represented the Proctors, following which both branches were merged into a group of practitioners called Attorneys-At-Law under the Justice Law No. 44 of 1973 . Membership is optional for any Attorney-at-law. Traditionally the President of the Bar Association of Sri Lanka is considered the head of the unofficial bar.

== Past Presidents ==
- Hector Wilfred Jayewardene (1975–1977)
- Eardley Perera (1977–1979)
- A. C. Gooneratne (1979–1981)
- A. C. de Zoysa (1981–1983)
- Herman J C Perera (1983–1985)
- Nimal Senanayake (1985–1987)
- H. L. de Silva (1987–1989)
- Desmond Fernando (1989–1991)
- Ranjith Abeysuriya (1991–1993)
- D. W. Abeyakoon (1993–1995)
- N. R. M. Daluwatte (1995–1997)
- Romesh de Silva (1997–1999)
- Upali A. Gooneratne (1999–2001)
- Ajantha W. Athukorala (2001–2003)
- Ananda Wijesekera (2003–2004)
- M Ikram Mohamed (2004–2005)
- Desmond Fernando (2005–2006)
- Nihal Jayamanne (2006–2008)
- W. Dayaratne (2008–2010)
- Shibly Aziz (2010–2012)
- Wijeyadasa Rajapakshe (2012–2013)
- Upul Jayasuriya (2013–2015)
- Geoffrey Alagaratnam (2015–2017)
- U. R. de Silva (2017–2019)
- Kalinga Indatissa (2019–2021)
- Saliya Pieris (2021–2023)
- Kaushalya Nawaratne (2023–2025)
- Rajeev Amarasuriya (2025–present)

== See also ==
- Attorney General's Department (Sri Lanka)
