= Rambukkana Polling Division =

Rambukkana
- Polling Division
- Interactive map of Rambukkana
- Coordinates: 7.309397°N 80.382153°E
- Country: Sri Lanka
- Province: Sabaragamuwa Province, Sri Lanka
- Electoral District: Kegalle Electoral District

Area
  - Total: 129.29 km^{2} (49.92 sq mi)

Population (2012)
  - Total: 82,769
  - Density: 640/km^{2} (1,700/sq mi)
- ISO 3166 code: EC-22D

The Rambukkana Polling Division is a Polling Division in the Kegalle Electoral District, in the Sabaragamuwa Province, Sri Lanka.

== Presidential Election Results ==
=== Summary ===
The winner of Rambukkana has matched the final country result 7 out of 8 times.

Year	Rambukkana	Kegalle Electoral District	MAE %	Sri Lanka	MAE %
2019	SLPP	SLPP	4.08%	SLPP	6.83%
2015	UPFA	UPFA	2.24%	NDF	6.43%
2010	UPFA	UPFA	2.25%	UPFA	6.00%
2005	UPFA	UPFA	3.24%	UPFA	3.98%
1999	PA	PA	4.46%	PA	4.37%
1994	PA	PA	3.31%	PA	2.86%
1988	UNP	UNP	2.11%	UNP	3.40%
1982	UNP	UNP	1.41%	UNP	1.80%
Matches/Mean MAE	7/8	7/8	2.89%	8/8	4.46%

=== 2019 Sri Lankan Presidential Election ===
Party	Rambukkana		Kegalle Electoral District		Sri Lanka	
Party	Votes	%	Votes	%	Votes	%
SLPP	31,902	59.54%	320,484	55.66%	6,924,255	52.25%
NDF	18,657	34.82%	228,032	39.60%	5,564,239	41.99%
NMPP	1,828	3.41%	15,043	2.61%	418,553	3.16%
Other Parties (with < 1%)	1,197	2.23%	12,272	2.13%	345,452	2.61%
Valid Votes	53,584	99.04%	575,831	99.11%	13,252,499	98.99%
Rejected Votes	519	0.96%	5,152	0.89%	135,452	1.01%
Total Polled	54,103	84.80%	580,983	85.89%	13,387,951	83.71%
Registered Electors	63,798		676,440		15,992,568	

=== 2015 Sri Lankan Presidential Election ===
Party	Rambukkana		Kegalle Electoral District		Sri Lanka	
Party	Votes	%	Votes	%	Votes	%
UPFA	27,400	54.12%	278,130	51.82%	5,768,090	47.58%
NDF	22,690	44.82%	252,533	47.05%	6,217,162	51.28%
Other Parties (with < 1%)	538	1.06%	6,108	1.14%	138,200	1.14%
Valid Votes	50,628	99.11%	536,771	98.80%	12,123,452	98.85%
Rejected Votes	457	0.89%	6,515	1.20%	140,925	1.15%
Total Polled	51,085	78.19%	543,286	79.85%	12,264,377	78.69%
Registered Electors	65,337		680,414		15,585,942	

=== 2010 Sri Lankan Presidential Election ===
Party	Rambukkana		Kegalle Electoral District		Sri Lanka	
Party	Votes	%	Votes	%	Votes	%
UPFA	29,864	64.20%	296,639	61.80%	6,015,934	57.88%
NDF	15,967	34.33%	174,877	36.44%	4,173,185	40.15%
Other Parties (with < 1%)	686	1.47%	8,448	1.76%	204,494	1.97%
Valid Votes	46,517	99.26%	479,964	99.25%	10,393,613	99.03%
Rejected Votes	346	0.74%	3,604	0.75%	101,838	0.97%
Total Polled	46,863	75.19%	483,568	76.11%	10,495,451	66.70%
Registered Electors	62,325		635,342		15,734,587	

=== 2005 Sri Lankan Presidential Election ===
Party	Rambukkana		Kegalle Electoral District		Sri Lanka	
Party	Votes	%	Votes	%	Votes	%
UPFA	24,559	54.36%	239,184	51.02%	4,887,152	50.29%
UNP	20,078	44.44%	223,483	47.67%	4,706,366	48.43%
Other Parties (with < 1%)	541	1.20%	6,106	1.30%	123,521	1.27%
Valid Votes	45,178	98.91%	468,773	98.99%	9,717,039	98.88%
Rejected Votes	496	1.09%	4,795	1.01%	109,869	1.12%
Total Polled	45,674	76.49%	473,568	78.68%	9,826,908	69.51%
Registered Electors	59,711		601,872		14,136,979	

=== 1999 Sri Lankan Presidential Election ===
Party	Rambukkana		Kegalle Electoral District		Sri Lanka	
Party	Votes	%	Votes	%	Votes	%
PA	22,909	55.79%	210,185	51.30%	4,312,157	51.12%
UNP	15,635	38.07%	176,376	43.05%	3,602,748	42.71%
JVP	1,740	4.24%	14,997	3.66%	343,927	4.08%
Other Parties (with < 1%)	781	1.90%	8,122	1.98%	176,679	2.09%
Valid Votes	41,065	98.07%	409,680	98.05%	8,435,754	97.69%
Rejected Votes	809	1.93%	8,136	1.95%	199,536	2.31%
Total Polled	41,874	77.08%	417,816	76.52%	8,635,290	72.17%
Registered Electors	54,323		546,038		11,965,536	

=== 1994 Sri Lankan Presidential Election ===
Party	Rambukkana		Kegalle Electoral District		Sri Lanka	
Party	Votes	%	Votes	%	Votes	%
PA	21,224	59.42%	211,676	56.06%	4,709,205	62.28%
UNP	13,899	38.91%	159,707	42.30%	2,715,283	35.91%
Other Parties (with < 1%)	597	1.67%	6,209	1.64%	137,040	1.81%
Valid Votes	35,720	97.91%	377,592	98.14%	7,561,526	98.03%
Rejected Votes	761	2.09%	7,139	1.86%	151,706	1.97%
Total Polled	36,481	72.97%	384,731	74.84%	7,713,232	69.12%
Registered Electors	49,996		514,055		11,158,880	

=== 1988 Sri Lankan Presidential Election ===
Party	Rambukkana		Kegalle Electoral District		Sri Lanka	
Party	Votes	%	Votes	%	Votes	%
UNP	16,033	55.18%	168,720	57.11%	2,569,199	50.43%
SLFP	12,490	42.98%	119,769	40.54%	2,289,857	44.95%
SLMP	535	1.84%	6,923	2.34%	235,701	4.63%
Valid Votes	29,058	98.61%	295,412	98.57%	5,094,754	98.24%
Rejected Votes	411	1.39%	4,277	1.43%	91,499	1.76%
Total Polled	29,469	67.21%	299,689	67.98%	5,186,256	55.87%
Registered Electors	43,847		440,836		9,283,143	

=== 1982 Sri Lankan Presidential Election ===
Party	Rambukkana		Kegalle Electoral District		Sri Lanka	
Party	Votes	%	Votes	%	Votes	%
UNP	19,130	55.68%	195,444	57.02%	3,450,815	52.93%
SLFP	13,220	38.48%	126,538	36.92%	2,546,348	39.05%
JVP	1,799	5.24%	13,706	4.00%	273,428	4.19%
Other Parties (with < 1%)	206	0.60%	7,074	2.06%	249,460	3.83%
Valid Votes	34,355	99.05%	342,762	98.69%	6,520,156	98.78%
Rejected Votes	328	0.95%	4,537	1.31%	80,470	1.22%
Total Polled	34,683	83.35%	347,299	84.30%	6,600,626	80.15%
Registered Electors	41,612		411,994		8,235,358	

== Parliamentary Election Results ==
=== Summary ===
The winner of Rambukkana has matched the final country result 7 out of 7 times.

Year	Rambukkana	Kegalle Electoral District	MAE %	Sri Lanka	MAE %
2015	UNP	UNP	1.01%	UNP	2.71%
2010	UPFA	UPFA	0.93%	UPFA	5.00%
2004	UPFA	UPFA	3.01%	UPFA	4.70%
2001	UNP	UNP	0.80%	UNP	3.05%
2000	PA	PA	1.99%	PA	3.03%
1994	PA	UNP	3.46%	PA	2.66%
1989	UNP	UNP	2.54%	UNP	6.42%
Matches/Mean MAE	7/7	6/7	1.96%	7/7	3.94%

=== 2015 Sri Lankan Parliamentary Election ===
Party	Rambukkana		Kegalle Electoral District		Sri Lanka	
Party	Votes	%	Votes	%	Votes	%
UNP	22,447	48.24%	247,467	49.52%	5,098,916	45.77%
UPFA	21,491	46.18%	227,208	45.47%	4,732,664	42.48%
JVP	2,249	4.83%	18,394	3.68%	544,154	4.88%
Other Parties (with < 1%)	346	0.74%	6,661	1.33%	101,045	0.91%
Valid Votes	46,533	96.32%	499,730	96.35%	11,140,333	95.35%
Rejected Votes	1,774	3.67%	18,770	3.62%	516,926	4.42%
Total Polled	48,312	73.94%	518,674	79.81%	11,684,111	77.66%
Registered Electors	65,337		649,878		15,044,490	

=== 2010 Sri Lankan Parliamentary Election ===
Party	Rambukkana		Kegalle Electoral District		Sri Lanka	
Party	Votes	%	Votes	%	Votes	%
UPFA	23,317	67.74%	242,463	66.89%	4,846,388	60.38%
UNP	9,545	27.73%	104,925	28.95%	2,357,057	29.37%
DNA	1,427	4.15%	13,518	3.73%	441,251	5.50%
Other Parties (with < 1%)	133	0.39%	1,549	0.43%	33,973	0.42%
Valid Votes	34,422	93.46%	362,455	93.32%	8,026,322	96.03%
Rejected Votes	2,407	6.54%	25,965	6.68%	581,465	6.96%
Total Polled	36,829	59.09%	388,420	60.93%	8,358,246	59.29%
Registered Electors	62,325		637,524		14,097,690	

=== 2004 Sri Lankan Parliamentary Election ===
Party	Rambukkana		Kegalle Electoral District		Sri Lanka	
Party	Votes	%	Votes	%	Votes	%
UPFA	22,187	53.49%	214,267	50.88%	4,223,126	45.70%
UNP	16,858	40.64%	186,641	44.32%	3,486,792	37.73%
JHU	2,256	5.44%	18,034	4.28%	552,723	5.98%
Other Parties (with < 1%)	176	0.42%	2,187	0.52%	59,247	0.64%
Valid Votes	41,477	94.71%	421,134	94.25%	9,241,931	94.52%
Rejected Votes	2,316	5.29%	25,685	5.75%	534,452	5.47%
Total Polled	43,793	74.75%	446,816	78.35%	9,777,821	75.74%
Registered Electors	58,588		570,299		12,909,631	

=== 2001 Sri Lankan Parliamentary Election ===
Party	Rambukkana		Kegalle Electoral District		Sri Lanka	
Party	Votes	%	Votes	%	Votes	%
UNP	19,972	48.61%	208,104	49.36%	4,086,026	45.62%
PA	17,068	41.54%	170,901	40.53%	3,330,815	37.19%
JVP	3,454	8.41%	36,711	8.71%	815,353	9.10%
Other Parties (with < 1%)	591	1.44%	5,924	1.40%	123,245	1.38%
Valid Votes	41,085	95.26%	421,640	94.90%	8,955,844	94.77%
Rejected Votes	2,045	4.74%	22,669	5.10%	494,009	5.23%
Total Polled	43,130	76.23%	444,309	80.10%	9,449,878	76.03%
Registered Electors	56,580		554,698		12,428,762	

=== 2000 Sri Lankan Parliamentary Election ===
Party	Rambukkana		Kegalle Electoral District		Sri Lanka	
Party	Votes	%	Votes	%	Votes	%
PA	20,907	51.26%	201,114	48.88%	3,899,329	45.33%
UNP	16,647	40.81%	175,627	42.69%	3,451,765	40.12%
JVP	2,356	5.78%	22,028	5.35%	518,725	6.03%
SU	461	1.13%	4,549	1.11%	127,859	1.49%
Other Parties (with < 1%)	416	1.02%	8,094	1.97%	291,648	3.39%
Valid Votes	40,787	N/A	411,412	N/A	8,602,617	N/A

=== 1994 Sri Lankan Parliamentary Election ===
Party	Rambukkana		Kegalle Electoral District		Sri Lanka	
Party	Votes	%	Votes	%	Votes	%
PA	19,346	51.19%	190,689	47.91%	3,887,805	48.94%
UNP	17,976	47.57%	203,938	51.24%	3,498,370	44.04%
SLPF	469	1.24%	3,383	0.85%	90,078	1.13%
Valid Votes	37,791	96.04%	398,010	95.89%	7,943,688	95.20%
Rejected Votes	1,560	3.96%	17,043	4.11%	400,395	4.80%
Total Polled	39,351	78.71%	415,053	80.78%	8,344,095	74.75%
Registered Electors	49,996		513,825		11,163,064	

=== 1989 Sri Lankan Parliamentary Election ===
Party	Rambukkana		Kegalle Electoral District		Sri Lanka	
Party	Votes	%	Votes	%	Votes	%
UNP	13,525	63.17%	174,334	61.12%	2,838,005	50.71%
SLFP	6,803	31.78%	80,668	28.28%	1,785,369	31.90%
ELJP	633	2.96%	14,056	4.93%	67,723	1.21%
USA	362	1.69%	15,168	5.32%	141,983	2.54%
Other Parties (with < 1%)	86	0.40%	1,028	0.36%	90,480	1.62%
Valid Votes	21,409	94.02%	285,254	93.95%	5,596,468	93.87%
Rejected Votes	1,361	5.98%	18,362	6.05%	365,563	6.13%
Total Polled	22,770	53.33%	303,616	69.46%	5,962,031	63.60%
Registered Electors	42,695		437,131		9,374,164	

== Demographics ==
=== Ethnicity ===
The Rambukkana Polling Division has a Sinhalese majority (95.4%) . In comparison, the Kegalle Electoral District (which contains the Rambukkana Polling Division) has a Sinhalese majority (85.5%)

Ethnicity in Rambukkana
1. Sinhalese (95.4%)
2. Moor (3.30%)
3. Other (1.30%)

=== Religion ===
The Rambukkana Polling Division has a Buddhist majority (91.0%) . In comparison, the Kegalle Electoral District (which contains the Rambukkana Polling Division) has a Buddhist majority (84.4%)

Religion in Rambukkana
1. Buddhist (91.0%)
2. Muslim (3.40%)
3. Other Christian (3.00%)
4. Roman Catholic (1.60%)
5. Other (1.00%)
