= Dedigama Polling Division =

Dedigama
- Polling Division
- Interactive map of Dedigama
- Coordinates: 7.198160°N 80.231464°E
- Country: Sri Lanka
- Province: Sabaragamuwa Province, Sri Lanka
- Electoral District: Kegalle Electoral District

Area
  - Total: 205.59 km^{2} (79.38 sq mi)

Population (2012)
  - Total: 113,056
  - Density: 550/km^{2} (1,400/sq mi)
- ISO 3166 code: EC-22A

The Dedigama Polling Division is a Polling Division in the Kegalle Electoral District, in the Sabaragamuwa Province, Sri Lanka.

== Presidential Election Results ==
=== Summary ===
The winner of Dedigama has matched the final country result 7 out of 8 times. Hence, Dedigama is a strong bellwether for presidential elections.

Year	Dedigama	Kegalle Electoral District	MAE %	Sri Lanka	MAE %
2019	SLPP	SLPP	1.16%	SLPP	3.93%
2015	UPFA	UPFA	0.96%	NDF	5.14%
2010	UPFA	UPFA	0.41%	UPFA	4.16%
2005	UPFA	UPFA	0.21%	UPFA	0.52%
1999	PA	PA	1.39%	PA	1.45%
1994	PA	PA	1.20%	PA	7.35%
1988	UNP	UNP	0.34%	UNP	5.31%
1982	UNP	UNP	1.56%	UNP	1.58%
Matches/Mean MAE	7/8	7/8	0.90%	8/8	3.68%

=== 2019 Sri Lankan Presidential Election ===
Party	Dedigama		Kegalle Electoral District		Sri Lanka	
Party	Votes	%	Votes	%	Votes	%
SLPP	41,632	56.84%	320,484	55.66%	6,924,255	52.25%
NDF	28,097	38.36%	228,032	39.60%	5,564,239	41.99%
NMPP	2,164	2.95%	15,043	2.61%	418,553	3.16%
Other Parties (with < 1%)	1,347	1.84%	12,272	2.13%	345,452	2.61%
Valid Votes	73,240	99.20%	575,831	99.11%	13,252,499	98.99%
Rejected Votes	593	0.80%	5,152	0.89%	135,452	1.01%
Total Polled	73,833	85.50%	580,983	85.89%	13,387,951	83.71%
Registered Electors	86,351		676,440		15,992,568	

=== 2015 Sri Lankan Presidential Election ===
Party	Dedigama		Kegalle Electoral District		Sri Lanka	
Party	Votes	%	Votes	%	Votes	%
UPFA	36,838	52.87%	278,130	51.82%	5,768,090	47.58%
NDF	32,163	46.16%	252,533	47.05%	6,217,162	51.28%
Other Parties (with < 1%)	671	0.96%	6,108	1.14%	138,200	1.14%
Valid Votes	69,672	98.98%	536,771	98.80%	12,123,452	98.85%
Rejected Votes	715	1.02%	6,515	1.20%	140,925	1.15%
Total Polled	70,387	80.17%	543,286	79.85%	12,264,377	78.69%
Registered Electors	87,800		680,414		15,585,942	

=== 2010 Sri Lankan Presidential Election ===
Party	Dedigama		Kegalle Electoral District		Sri Lanka	
Party	Votes	%	Votes	%	Votes	%
UPFA	39,736	62.34%	296,639	61.80%	6,015,934	57.88%
NDF	23,097	36.24%	174,877	36.44%	4,173,185	40.15%
Other Parties (with < 1%)	905	1.42%	8,448	1.76%	204,494	1.97%
Valid Votes	63,738	99.40%	479,964	99.25%	10,393,613	99.03%
Rejected Votes	383	0.60%	3,604	0.75%	101,838	0.97%
Total Polled	64,121	76.74%	483,568	76.11%	10,495,451	66.70%
Registered Electors	83,554		635,342		15,734,587	

=== 2005 Sri Lankan Presidential Election ===
Party	Dedigama		Kegalle Electoral District		Sri Lanka	
Party	Votes	%	Votes	%	Votes	%
UPFA	32,231	50.93%	239,184	51.02%	4,887,152	50.29%
UNP	30,391	48.02%	223,483	47.67%	4,706,366	48.43%
Other Parties (with < 1%)	661	1.04%	6,106	1.30%	123,521	1.27%
Valid Votes	63,283	99.04%	468,773	98.99%	9,717,039	98.88%
Rejected Votes	613	0.96%	4,795	1.01%	109,869	1.12%
Total Polled	63,896	79.67%	473,568	78.68%	9,826,908	69.51%
Registered Electors	80,201		601,872		14,136,979	

=== 1999 Sri Lankan Presidential Election ===
Party	Dedigama		Kegalle Electoral District		Sri Lanka	
Party	Votes	%	Votes	%	Votes	%
PA	28,307	50.07%	210,185	51.30%	4,312,157	51.12%
UNP	25,324	44.80%	176,376	43.05%	3,602,748	42.71%
JVP	2,005	3.55%	14,997	3.66%	343,927	4.08%
Other Parties (with < 1%)	897	1.59%	8,122	1.98%	176,679	2.09%
Valid Votes	56,533	98.15%	409,680	98.05%	8,435,754	97.69%
Rejected Votes	1,065	1.85%	8,136	1.95%	199,536	2.31%
Total Polled	57,598	77.53%	417,816	76.52%	8,635,290	72.17%
Registered Electors	74,291		546,038		11,965,536	

=== 1994 Sri Lankan Presidential Election ===
Party	Dedigama		Kegalle Electoral District		Sri Lanka	
Party	Votes	%	Votes	%	Votes	%
PA	28,939	54.93%	211,676	56.06%	4,709,205	62.28%
UNP	22,989	43.64%	159,707	42.30%	2,715,283	35.91%
Other Parties (with < 1%)	755	1.43%	6,209	1.64%	137,040	1.81%
Valid Votes	52,683	98.51%	377,592	98.14%	7,561,526	98.03%
Rejected Votes	795	1.49%	7,139	1.86%	151,706	1.97%
Total Polled	53,478	76.24%	384,731	74.84%	7,713,232	69.12%
Registered Electors	70,142		514,055		11,158,880	

=== 1988 Sri Lankan Presidential Election ===
Party	Dedigama		Kegalle Electoral District		Sri Lanka	
Party	Votes	%	Votes	%	Votes	%
UNP	20,951	57.27%	168,720	57.11%	2,569,199	50.43%
SLFP	15,046	41.13%	119,769	40.54%	2,289,857	44.95%
SLMP	587	1.60%	6,923	2.34%	235,701	4.63%
Valid Votes	36,584	98.93%	295,412	98.57%	5,094,754	98.24%
Rejected Votes	396	1.07%	4,277	1.43%	91,499	1.76%
Total Polled	36,980	59.97%	299,689	67.98%	5,186,256	55.87%
Registered Electors	61,669		440,836		9,283,143	

=== 1982 Sri Lankan Presidential Election ===
Party	Dedigama		Kegalle Electoral District		Sri Lanka	
Party	Votes	%	Votes	%	Votes	%
UNP	26,926	55.58%	195,444	57.02%	3,450,815	52.93%
SLFP	18,803	38.81%	126,538	36.92%	2,546,348	39.05%
JVP	2,201	4.54%	13,706	4.00%	273,428	4.19%
Other Parties (with < 1%)	518	1.07%	7,074	2.06%	249,460	3.83%
Valid Votes	48,448	98.90%	342,762	98.69%	6,520,156	98.78%
Rejected Votes	538	1.10%	4,537	1.31%	80,470	1.22%
Total Polled	48,986	85.00%	347,299	84.30%	6,600,626	80.15%
Registered Electors	57,629		411,994		8,235,358	

== Parliamentary Election Results ==
=== Summary ===
The winner of Dedigama has matched the final country result 5 out of 7 times. Hence, Dedigama is a Weak Bellwether for Parliamentary Elections.

Year	Dedigama	Kegalle Electoral District	MAE %	Sri Lanka	MAE %
2015	UPFA	UNP	1.97%	UNP	2.88%
2010	UPFA	UPFA	0.81%	UPFA	3.51%
2004	UPFA	UPFA	0.95%	UPFA	5.21%
2001	UNP	UNP	0.80%	UNP	2.88%
2000	PA	PA	2.83%	PA	2.52%
1994	UNP	UNP	0.15%	PA	3.54%
1989	UNP	UNP	7.03%	UNP	1.21%
Matches/Mean MAE	5/7	6/7	2.08%	7/7	3.11%

=== 2015 Sri Lankan Parliamentary Election ===
Party	Dedigama		Kegalle Electoral District		Sri Lanka	
Party	Votes	%	Votes	%	Votes	%
UPFA	30,511	47.43%	227,208	45.47%	4,732,664	42.48%
UNP	30,495	47.40%	247,467	49.52%	5,098,916	45.77%
JVP	2,765	4.30%	18,394	3.68%	544,154	4.88%
Other Parties (with < 1%)	560	0.87%	6,661	1.33%	101,045	0.91%
Valid Votes	64,331	96.64%	499,730	96.35%	11,140,333	95.35%
Rejected Votes	2,218	3.33%	18,770	3.62%	516,926	4.42%
Total Polled	66,567	75.82%	518,674	79.81%	11,684,111	77.66%
Registered Electors	87,800		649,878		15,044,490	

=== 2010 Sri Lankan Parliamentary Election ===
Party	Dedigama		Kegalle Electoral District		Sri Lanka	
Party	Votes	%	Votes	%	Votes	%
UPFA	31,983	65.97%	242,463	66.89%	4,846,388	60.38%
UNP	14,331	29.56%	104,925	28.95%	2,357,057	29.37%
DNA	2,022	4.17%	13,518	3.73%	441,251	5.50%
Other Parties (with < 1%)	143	0.29%	1,549	0.43%	33,973	0.42%
Valid Votes	48,479	93.56%	362,455	93.32%	8,026,322	96.03%
Rejected Votes	3,335	6.44%	25,965	6.68%	581,465	6.96%
Total Polled	51,814	62.01%	388,420	60.93%	8,358,246	59.29%
Registered Electors	83,554		637,524		14,097,690	

=== 2004 Sri Lankan Parliamentary Election ===
Party	Dedigama		Kegalle Electoral District		Sri Lanka	
Party	Votes	%	Votes	%	Votes	%
UPFA	28,964	50.24%	214,267	50.88%	4,223,126	45.70%
UNP	26,328	45.67%	186,641	44.32%	3,486,792	37.73%
JHU	2,095	3.63%	18,034	4.28%	552,723	5.98%
Other Parties (with < 1%)	264	0.46%	2,179	0.52%	60,867	0.66%
Valid Votes	57,651	94.85%	421,134	94.25%	9,241,931	94.52%
Rejected Votes	3,132	5.15%	25,685	5.75%	534,452	5.47%
Total Polled	60,780	77.57%	446,816	78.35%	9,777,821	75.74%
Registered Electors	78,357		570,299		12,909,631	

=== 2001 Sri Lankan Parliamentary Election ===
Party	Dedigama		Kegalle Electoral District		Sri Lanka	
Party	Votes	%	Votes	%	Votes	%
UNP	29,259	50.00%	208,104	49.36%	4,086,026	45.62%
PA	23,109	39.49%	170,901	40.53%	3,330,815	37.19%
JVP	5,515	9.42%	36,711	8.71%	815,353	9.10%
Other Parties (with < 1%)	632	1.08%	5,924	1.40%	123,245	1.38%
Valid Votes	58,515	95.86%	421,640	94.90%	8,955,844	94.77%
Rejected Votes	2,527	4.14%	22,669	5.10%	494,009	5.23%
Total Polled	61,042	79.82%	444,309	80.10%	9,449,878	76.03%
Registered Electors	76,475		554,698		12,428,762	

=== 2000 Sri Lankan Parliamentary Election ===
Party	Dedigama		Kegalle Electoral District		Sri Lanka	
Party	Votes	%	Votes	%	Votes	%
PA	25,961	45.79%	201,114	48.88%	3,899,329	45.33%
UNP	25,938	45.75%	175,627	42.69%	3,451,765	40.12%
JVP	3,153	5.56%	22,028	5.35%	518,725	6.03%
SU	678	1.20%	4,549	1.11%	127,859	1.49%
NUA	629	1.11%	4,797	1.17%	185,593	2.16%
Other Parties (with < 1%)	341	0.60%	3,297	0.80%	106,055	1.23%
Valid Votes	56,700	N/A	411,412	N/A	8,602,617	N/A

=== 1994 Sri Lankan Parliamentary Election ===
Party	Dedigama		Kegalle Electoral District		Sri Lanka	
Party	Votes	%	Votes	%	Votes	%
UNP	28,357	51.12%	203,938	51.24%	3,498,370	44.04%
PA	26,678	48.10%	190,689	47.91%	3,887,805	48.94%
Other Parties (with < 1%)	434	0.78%	3,383	0.85%	90,078	1.13%
Valid Votes	55,469	96.78%	398,010	95.89%	7,943,688	95.20%
Rejected Votes	1,845	3.22%	17,043	4.11%	400,395	4.80%
Total Polled	57,314	81.71%	415,053	80.78%	8,344,095	74.75%
Registered Electors	70,142		513,825		11,163,064	

=== 1989 Sri Lankan Parliamentary Election ===
Party	Dedigama		Kegalle Electoral District		Sri Lanka	
Party	Votes	%	Votes	%	Votes	%
UNP	23,006	52.12%	174,334	61.12%	2,838,005	50.71%
SLFP	13,722	31.09%	80,668	28.28%	1,785,369	31.90%
ELJP	6,834	15.48%	14,056	4.93%	67,723	1.21%
USA	508	1.15%	15,168	5.32%	141,983	2.54%
Other Parties (with < 1%)	70	0.16%	1,028	0.36%	90,480	1.62%
Valid Votes	44,140	94.38%	285,254	93.95%	5,596,468	93.87%
Rejected Votes	2,629	5.62%	18,362	6.05%	365,563	6.13%
Total Polled	46,769	77.16%	303,616	69.46%	5,962,031	63.60%
Registered Electors	60,616		437,131		9,374,164	

== Demographics ==
=== Ethnicity ===
The Dedigama Polling Division has a Sinhalese majority (91.2%) . In comparison, the Kegalle Electoral District (which contains the Dedigama Polling Division) has a Sinhalese majority (85.5%)

Ethnicity in Dedigama
1. Sinhalese (91.2%)
2. Moor (5.50%)
3. Indian Tamil (1.90%)
4. Sri Lankan Tamil (1.40%)
5. Other (0.10%)

=== Religion ===
The Dedigama Polling Division has a Buddhist majority (90.8%) . In comparison, the Kegalle Electoral District (which contains the Dedigama Polling Division) has a Buddhist majority (84.4%)

Religion in Dedigama
1. Buddhist (90.8%)
2. Muslim (5.60%)
3. Hindu (2.70%)
4. Other (0.90%)
