= Ruwanwella Polling Division =

Ruwanwella
- Polling Division
- Interactive map of Ruwanwella
- Coordinates: 7.067171°N 80.219072°E
- Country: Sri Lanka
- Province: Sabaragamuwa Province, Sri Lanka
- Electoral District: Kegalle Electoral District

Area
  - Total: 147.23 km^{2} (56.85 sq mi)

Population (2012)
  - Total: 63,913
  - Density: 434/km^{2} (1,120/sq mi)
- ISO 3166 code: EC-22H

The Ruwanwella Polling Division is a Polling Division in the Kegalle Electoral District, in the Sabaragamuwa Province, Sri Lanka.

== Presidential Election Results ==
=== Summary ===
The winner of Ruwanwella has matched the final country result 7 out of 8 times. Hence, Ruwanwella serves as a bellwether for presidential elections.

Year	Ruwanwella	Kegalle Electoral District	MAE %	Sri Lanka	MAE %
2019	SLPP	SLPP	0.81%	SLPP	3.59%
2015	UPFA	UPFA	0.97%	NDF	5.15%
2010	UPFA	UPFA	0.25%	UPFA	3.50%
2005	UPFA	UPFA	0.09%	UPFA	0.83%
1999	PA	PA	0.65%	PA	0.81%
1994	PA	PA	0.57%	PA	6.73%
1988	UNP	UNP	2.61%	UNP	7.97%
1982	UNP	UNP	1.09%	UNP	4.18%
Matches/Mean MAE	7/8	7/8	0.88%	8/8	4.10%

=== 2019 Sri Lankan Presidential Election ===
Party	Ruwanwella		Kegalle Electoral District		Sri Lanka	
Party	Votes	%	Votes	%	Votes	%
SLPP	35,714	56.71%	320,484	55.66%	6,924,255	52.25%
NDF	24,604	39.07%	228,032	39.60%	5,564,239	41.99%
NMPP	1,403	2.23%	15,043	2.61%	418,553	3.16%
Other Parties (with < 1%)	1,260	2.00%	12,272	2.13%	345,452	2.61%
Valid Votes	62,981	99.10%	575,831	99.11%	13,252,499	98.99%
Rejected Votes	570	0.90%	5,152	0.89%	135,452	1.01%
Total Polled	63,551	85.43%	580,983	85.89%	13,387,951	83.71%
Registered Electors	74,386		676,440		15,992,568	

=== 2015 Sri Lankan Presidential Election ===
Party	Ruwanwella		Kegalle Electoral District		Sri Lanka	
Party	Votes	%	Votes	%	Votes	%
UPFA	30,922	52.79%	278,130	51.82%	5,768,090	47.58%
NDF	26,984	46.06%	252,533	47.05%	6,217,162	51.28%
Other Parties (with < 1%)	675	1.15%	6,108	1.14%	138,200	1.14%
Valid Votes	58,581	99.02%	536,771	98.80%	12,123,452	98.85%
Rejected Votes	577	0.98%	6,515	1.20%	140,925	1.15%
Total Polled	59,158	80.49%	543,286	79.85%	12,264,377	78.69%
Registered Electors	73,498		680,414		15,585,942	

=== 2010 Sri Lankan Presidential Election ===
Party	Ruwanwella		Kegalle Electoral District		Sri Lanka	
Party	Votes	%	Votes	%	Votes	%
UPFA	33,145	61.65%	296,639	61.80%	6,015,934	57.88%
NDF	19,819	36.86%	174,877	36.44%	4,173,185	40.15%
Other Parties (with < 1%)	800	1.49%	8,448	1.76%	204,494	1.97%
Valid Votes	53,764	99.16%	479,964	99.25%	10,393,613	99.03%
Rejected Votes	458	0.84%	3,604	0.75%	101,838	0.97%
Total Polled	54,222	76.97%	483,568	76.11%	10,495,451	66.70%
Registered Electors	70,448		635,342		15,734,587	

=== 2005 Sri Lankan Presidential Election ===
Party	Ruwanwella		Kegalle Electoral District		Sri Lanka	
Party	Votes	%	Votes	%	Votes	%
UPFA	26,522	51.09%	239,184	51.02%	4,887,152	50.29%
UNP	24,684	47.55%	223,483	47.67%	4,706,366	48.43%
Other Parties (with < 1%)	703	1.35%	6,106	1.30%	123,521	1.27%
Valid Votes	51,909	99.08%	468,773	98.99%	9,717,039	98.88%
Rejected Votes	481	0.92%	4,795	1.01%	109,869	1.12%
Total Polled	52,390	79.39%	473,568	78.68%	9,826,908	69.51%
Registered Electors	65,989		601,872		14,136,979	

=== 1999 Sri Lankan Presidential Election ===
Party	Ruwanwella		Kegalle Electoral District		Sri Lanka	
Party	Votes	%	Votes	%	Votes	%
PA	23,868	52.42%	210,185	51.30%	4,312,157	51.12%
UNP	19,546	42.93%	176,376	43.05%	3,602,748	42.71%
JVP	1,337	2.94%	14,997	3.66%	343,927	4.08%
Other Parties (with < 1%)	778	1.71%	8,122	1.98%	176,679	2.09%
Valid Votes	45,529	98.43%	409,680	98.05%	8,435,754	97.69%
Rejected Votes	725	1.57%	8,136	1.95%	199,536	2.31%
Total Polled	46,254	77.31%	417,816	76.52%	8,635,290	72.17%
Registered Electors	59,827		546,038		11,965,536	

=== 1994 Sri Lankan Presidential Election ===
Party	Ruwanwella		Kegalle Electoral District		Sri Lanka	
Party	Votes	%	Votes	%	Votes	%
PA	23,340	55.49%	211,676	56.06%	4,709,205	62.28%
UNP	18,038	42.88%	159,707	42.30%	2,715,283	35.91%
Other Parties (with < 1%)	685	1.63%	6,209	1.64%	137,040	1.81%
Valid Votes	42,063	98.59%	377,592	98.14%	7,561,526	98.03%
Rejected Votes	602	1.41%	7,139	1.86%	151,706	1.97%
Total Polled	42,665	75.58%	384,731	74.84%	7,713,232	69.12%
Registered Electors	56,451		514,055		11,158,880	

=== 1988 Sri Lankan Presidential Election ===
Party	Ruwanwella		Kegalle Electoral District		Sri Lanka	
Party	Votes	%	Votes	%	Votes	%
UNP	21,282	58.78%	168,720	57.11%	2,569,199	50.43%
SLFP	13,249	36.59%	119,769	40.54%	2,289,857	44.95%
SLMP	1,674	4.62%	6,923	2.34%	235,701	4.63%
Valid Votes	36,205	98.53%	295,412	98.57%	5,094,754	98.24%
Rejected Votes	542	1.47%	4,277	1.43%	91,499	1.76%
Total Polled	36,747	73.43%	299,689	67.98%	5,186,256	55.87%
Registered Electors	50,045		440,836		9,283,143	

=== 1982 Sri Lankan Presidential Election ===
Party	Ruwanwella		Kegalle Electoral District		Sri Lanka	
Party	Votes	%	Votes	%	Votes	%
UNP	22,645	57.48%	195,444	57.02%	3,450,815	52.93%
SLFP	13,749	34.90%	126,538	36.92%	2,546,348	39.05%
LSSP	1,683	4.27%	6,184	1.80%	58,531	0.90%
JVP	1,198	3.04%	13,706	4.00%	273,428	4.19%
Other Parties (with < 1%)	124	0.31%	890	0.26%	190,929	2.93%
Valid Votes	39,399	97.87%	342,762	98.69%	6,520,156	98.78%
Rejected Votes	856	2.13%	4,537	1.31%	80,470	1.22%
Total Polled	40,255	85.05%	347,299	84.30%	6,600,626	80.15%
Registered Electors	47,333		411,994		8,235,358	

== Parliamentary Election Results ==
=== Summary ===
The winner of Ruwanwella has matched the final country result 5 out of 7 times. Hence, Ruwanwella is a Weak Bellwether for Parliamentary Elections.

Year	Ruwanwella	Kegalle Electoral District	MAE %	Sri Lanka	MAE %
2015	UPFA	UNP	2.11%	UNP	3.48%
2010	UPFA	UPFA	1.51%	UPFA	3.79%
2004	UPFA	UPFA	1.79%	UPFA	5.29%
2001	UNP	UNP	3.29%	UNP	2.87%
2000	PA	PA	2.38%	PA	3.24%
1994	UNP	UNP	1.03%	PA	2.81%
1989	UNP	UNP	7.37%	UNP	13.43%
Matches/Mean MAE	5/7	6/7	2.78%	7/7	4.99%

=== 2015 Sri Lankan Parliamentary Election ===
Party	Ruwanwella		Kegalle Electoral District		Sri Lanka	
Party	Votes	%	Votes	%	Votes	%
UPFA	26,191	48.20%	227,208	45.47%	4,732,664	42.48%
UNP	25,993	47.84%	247,467	49.52%	5,098,916	45.77%
JVP	1,460	2.69%	18,394	3.68%	544,154	4.88%
Other Parties (with < 1%)	692	1.27%	6,661	1.33%	101,045	0.91%
Valid Votes	54,336	96.62%	499,730	96.35%	11,140,333	95.35%
Rejected Votes	1,885	3.35%	18,770	3.62%	516,926	4.42%
Total Polled	56,238	76.52%	518,674	79.81%	11,684,111	77.66%
Registered Electors	73,498		649,878		15,044,490	

=== 2010 Sri Lankan Parliamentary Election ===
Party	Ruwanwella		Kegalle Electoral District		Sri Lanka	
Party	Votes	%	Votes	%	Votes	%
UPFA	26,700	65.60%	242,463	66.89%	4,846,388	60.38%
UNP	12,640	31.06%	104,925	28.95%	2,357,057	29.37%
DNA	1,190	2.92%	13,518	3.73%	441,251	5.50%
Other Parties (with < 1%)	170	0.42%	1,549	0.43%	33,973	0.42%
Valid Votes	40,700	93.42%	362,455	93.32%	8,026,322	96.03%
Rejected Votes	2,869	6.58%	25,965	6.68%	581,465	6.96%
Total Polled	43,569	61.85%	388,420	60.93%	8,358,246	59.29%
Registered Electors	70,448		637,524		14,097,690	

=== 2004 Sri Lankan Parliamentary Election ===
Party	Ruwanwella		Kegalle Electoral District		Sri Lanka	
Party	Votes	%	Votes	%	Votes	%
UPFA	24,746	52.92%	214,267	50.88%	4,223,126	45.70%
UNP	19,950	42.66%	186,641	44.32%	3,486,792	37.73%
JHU	1,760	3.76%	18,034	4.28%	552,723	5.98%
Other Parties (with < 1%)	307	0.66%	2,187	0.52%	59,247	0.64%
Valid Votes	46,763	94.20%	421,134	94.25%	9,241,931	94.52%
Rejected Votes	2,880	5.80%	25,685	5.75%	534,452	5.47%
Total Polled	49,643	77.43%	446,816	78.35%	9,777,821	75.74%
Registered Electors	64,110		570,299		12,909,631	

=== 2001 Sri Lankan Parliamentary Election ===
Party	Ruwanwella		Kegalle Electoral District		Sri Lanka	
Party	Votes	%	Votes	%	Votes	%
UNP	21,298	45.90%	208,104	49.36%	4,086,026	45.62%
PA	20,574	44.34%	170,901	40.53%	3,330,815	37.19%
JVP	3,820	8.23%	36,711	8.71%	815,353	9.10%
Other Parties (with < 1%)	709	1.53%	5,924	1.40%	123,245	1.38%
Valid Votes	46,401	94.71%	421,640	94.90%	8,955,844	94.77%
Rejected Votes	2,594	5.29%	22,669	5.10%	494,009	5.23%
Total Polled	48,995	79.13%	444,309	80.10%	9,449,878	76.03%
Registered Electors	61,914		554,698		12,428,762	

=== 2000 Sri Lankan Parliamentary Election ===
Party	Ruwanwella		Kegalle Electoral District		Sri Lanka	
Party	Votes	%	Votes	%	Votes	%
PA	23,375	51.83%	201,114	48.88%	3,899,329	45.33%
UNP	18,298	40.58%	175,627	42.69%	3,451,765	40.12%
JVP	2,196	4.87%	22,028	5.35%	518,725	6.03%
SU	628	1.39%	4,549	1.11%	127,859	1.49%
Other Parties (with < 1%)	599	1.33%	8,094	1.97%	291,648	3.39%
Valid Votes	45,096	N/A	411,412	N/A	8,602,617	N/A

=== 1994 Sri Lankan Parliamentary Election ===
Party	Ruwanwella		Kegalle Electoral District		Sri Lanka	
Party	Votes	%	Votes	%	Votes	%
UNP	22,082	50.29%	203,938	51.24%	3,498,370	44.04%
PA	21,536	49.05%	190,689	47.91%	3,887,805	48.94%
Other Parties (with < 1%)	289	0.66%	3,383	0.85%	90,078	1.13%
Valid Votes	43,907	95.83%	398,010	95.89%	7,943,688	95.20%
Rejected Votes	1,910	4.17%	17,043	4.11%	400,395	4.80%
Total Polled	45,817	81.16%	415,053	80.78%	8,344,095	74.75%
Registered Electors	56,451		513,825		11,163,064	

=== 1989 Sri Lankan Parliamentary Election ===
Party	Ruwanwella		Kegalle Electoral District		Sri Lanka	
Party	Votes	%	Votes	%	Votes	%
UNP	22,644	64.93%	174,334	61.12%	2,838,005	50.71%
USA	6,865	19.69%	15,168	5.32%	141,983	2.54%
SLFP	4,828	13.84%	80,668	28.28%	1,785,369	31.90%
ELJP	393	1.13%	14,056	4.93%	67,723	1.21%
Other Parties (with < 1%)	142	0.41%	1,028	0.36%	90,480	1.62%
Valid Votes	34,872	95.03%	285,254	93.95%	5,596,468	93.87%
Rejected Votes	1,822	4.97%	18,362	6.05%	365,563	6.13%
Total Polled	36,694	74.39%	303,616	69.46%	5,962,031	63.60%
Registered Electors	49,325		437,131		9,374,164	

== Demographics ==
=== Ethnicity ===
The Ruwanwella Polling Division has a Sinhalese majority (87.1%) . In comparison, the Kegalle Electoral District (which contains the Ruwanwella Polling Division) has a Sinhalese majority (85.5%)

Ethnicity in Ruwanwella
1. Sinhalese (87.1%)
2. Moor (5.50%)
3. Sri Lankan Tamil (5.10%)
4. Indian Tamil (2.30%)
5. Other (0.10%)

=== Religion ===
The Ruwanwella Polling Division has a Buddhist majority (86.4%) . In comparison, the Kegalle Electoral District (which contains the Ruwanwella Polling Division) has a Buddhist majority (84.4%)

Religion in Ruwanwella
1. Buddhist (86.4%)
2. Hindu (6.20%)
3. Muslim (6.00%)
4. Other (1.50%)
