= Aranayaka Polling Division =

Aranayaka
- Polling Division
- Interactive map of Aranayaka
- Coordinates: 7.170890°N 80.427723°E
- Country: Sri Lanka
- Province: Sabaragamuwa Province, Sri Lanka
- Electoral District: Kegalle Electoral District

Area
  - Total: 117.67 km^{2} (45.43 sq mi)

Population (2012)
  - Total: 68,464
  - Density: 582/km^{2} (1,510/sq mi)
- ISO 3166 code: EC-22F

The Aranayaka Polling Division is a Polling Division in the Kegalle Electoral District, in the Sabaragamuwa Province, Sri Lanka.

== Presidential Election Results ==
=== Summary ===
The winner of Aranayaka has matched the final country result 6 out of 8 times. Hence, Aranayaka is a Weak Bellwether for Presidential Elections.

| Year | Aranayaka | Kegalle Electoral District | MAE % | Sri Lanka | MAE % |
|---|---|---|---|---|---|
| 2019 | SLPP | SLPP | 0.45% | SLPP | 3.20% |
| 2015 | UPFA | UPFA | 0.61% | NDF | 3.60% |
| 2010 | UPFA | UPFA | 0.21% | UPFA | 3.99% |
| 2005 | UNP | UPFA | 2.33% | UPFA | 1.59% |
| 1999 | PA | PA | 1.74% | PA | 1.70% |
| 1994 | PA | PA | 1.62% | PA | 7.79% |
| 1988 | UNP | UNP | 2.41% | UNP | 7.78% |
| 1982 | UNP | UNP | 1.63% | UNP | 4.61% |
| Matches/Mean MAE | 6/8 | 7/8 | 1.37% | 8/8 | 4.28% |

=== 2019 Sri Lankan Presidential Election ===
| Party | Aranayaka | | Kegalle Electoral District | | Sri Lanka | |
| Party | Votes | % | Votes | % | Votes | % |
|---|---|---|---|---|---|---|
| SLPP | 24,294 | 56.39% | 320,484 | 55.66% | 6,924,255 | 52.25% |
| NDF | 17,075 | 39.63% | 228,032 | 39.60% | 5,564,239 | 41.99% |
| Other Parties (with < 1%) | 961 | 2.23% | 12,272 | 2.13% | 345,452 | 2.61% |
| NMPP | 752 | 1.75% | 15,043 | 2.61% | 418,553 | 3.16% |
| Valid Votes | 43,082 | 99.34% | 575,831 | 99.11% | 13,252,499 | 98.99% |
| Rejected Votes | 288 | 0.66% | 5,152 | 0.89% | 135,452 | 1.01% |
| Total Polled | 43,370 | 85.41% | 580,983 | 85.89% | 13,387,951 | 83.71% |
| Registered Electors | 50,780 | | 676,440 | | 15,992,568 | |

=== 2015 Sri Lankan Presidential Election ===
| Party | Aranayaka | | Kegalle Electoral District | | Sri Lanka | |
| Party | Votes | % | Votes | % | Votes | % |
|---|---|---|---|---|---|---|
| UPFA | 20,742 | 51.04% | 278,130 | 51.82% | 5,768,090 | 47.58% |
| NDF | 19,297 | 47.48% | 252,533 | 47.05% | 6,217,162 | 51.28% |
| Other Parties (with < 1%) | 602 | 1.48% | 6,108 | 1.14% | 138,200 | 1.14% |
| Valid Votes | 40,641 | 98.98% | 536,771 | 98.80% | 12,123,452 | 98.85% |
| Rejected Votes | 417 | 1.02% | 6,515 | 1.20% | 140,925 | 1.15% |
| Total Polled | 41,058 | 77.17% | 543,286 | 79.85% | 12,264,377 | 78.69% |
| Registered Electors | 53,207 | | 680,414 | | 15,585,942 | |

=== 2010 Sri Lankan Presidential Election ===
| Party | Aranayaka | | Kegalle Electoral District | | Sri Lanka | |
| Party | Votes | % | Votes | % | Votes | % |
|---|---|---|---|---|---|---|
| UPFA | 23,204 | 61.81% | 296,639 | 61.80% | 6,015,934 | 57.88% |
| NDF | 13,469 | 35.88% | 174,877 | 36.44% | 4,173,185 | 40.15% |
| Other Parties (with < 1%) | 870 | 2.32% | 8,448 | 1.76% | 204,494 | 1.97% |
| Valid Votes | 37,543 | 99.29% | 479,964 | 99.25% | 10,393,613 | 99.03% |
| Rejected Votes | 268 | 0.71% | 3,604 | 0.75% | 101,838 | 0.97% |
| Total Polled | 37,811 | 73.58% | 483,568 | 76.11% | 10,495,451 | 66.70% |
| Registered Electors | 51,391 | | 635,342 | | 15,734,587 | |

=== 2005 Sri Lankan Presidential Election ===
| Party | Aranayaka | | Kegalle Electoral District | | Sri Lanka | |
| Party | Votes | % | Votes | % | Votes | % |
|---|---|---|---|---|---|---|
| UNP | 18,906 | 49.96% | 223,483 | 47.67% | 4,706,366 | 48.43% |
| UPFA | 18,391 | 48.59% | 239,184 | 51.02% | 4,887,152 | 50.29% |
| Other Parties (with < 1%) | 549 | 1.45% | 6,106 | 1.30% | 123,521 | 1.27% |
| Valid Votes | 37,846 | 98.87% | 468,773 | 98.99% | 9,717,039 | 98.88% |
| Rejected Votes | 434 | 1.13% | 4,795 | 1.01% | 109,869 | 1.12% |
| Total Polled | 38,280 | 77.20% | 473,568 | 78.68% | 9,826,908 | 69.51% |
| Registered Electors | 49,586 | | 601,872 | | 14,136,979 | |

=== 1999 Sri Lankan Presidential Election ===
| Party | Aranayaka | | Kegalle Electoral District | | Sri Lanka | |
| Party | Votes | % | Votes | % | Votes | % |
|---|---|---|---|---|---|---|
| PA | 18,314 | 53.31% | 210,185 | 51.30% | 4,312,157 | 51.12% |
| UNP | 14,224 | 41.40% | 176,376 | 43.05% | 3,602,748 | 42.71% |
| JVP | 1,232 | 3.59% | 14,997 | 3.66% | 343,927 | 4.08% |
| Other Parties (with < 1%) | 587 | 1.71% | 8,122 | 1.98% | 176,679 | 2.09% |
| Valid Votes | 34,357 | 97.87% | 409,680 | 98.05% | 8,435,754 | 97.69% |
| Rejected Votes | 749 | 2.13% | 8,136 | 1.95% | 199,536 | 2.31% |
| Total Polled | 35,106 | 76.19% | 417,816 | 76.52% | 8,635,290 | 72.17% |
| Registered Electors | 46,078 | | 546,038 | | 11,965,536 | |

=== 1994 Sri Lankan Presidential Election ===
| Party | Aranayaka | | Kegalle Electoral District | | Sri Lanka | |
| Party | Votes | % | Votes | % | Votes | % |
|---|---|---|---|---|---|---|
| PA | 17,156 | 54.41% | 211,676 | 56.06% | 4,709,205 | 62.28% |
| UNP | 13,854 | 43.94% | 159,707 | 42.30% | 2,715,283 | 35.91% |
| Other Parties (with < 1%) | 522 | 1.66% | 6,209 | 1.64% | 137,040 | 1.81% |
| Valid Votes | 31,532 | 98.12% | 377,592 | 98.14% | 7,561,526 | 98.03% |
| Rejected Votes | 604 | 1.88% | 7,139 | 1.86% | 151,706 | 1.97% |
| Total Polled | 32,136 | 75.90% | 384,731 | 74.84% | 7,713,232 | 69.12% |
| Registered Electors | 42,338 | | 514,055 | | 11,158,880 | |

=== 1988 Sri Lankan Presidential Election ===
| Party | Aranayaka | | Kegalle Electoral District | | Sri Lanka | |
| Party | Votes | % | Votes | % | Votes | % |
|---|---|---|---|---|---|---|
| UNP | 14,894 | 59.97% | 168,720 | 57.11% | 2,569,199 | 50.43% |
| SLFP | 9,605 | 38.68% | 119,769 | 40.54% | 2,289,857 | 44.95% |
| SLMP | 335 | 1.35% | 6,923 | 2.34% | 235,701 | 4.63% |
| Valid Votes | 24,834 | 98.54% | 295,412 | 98.57% | 5,094,754 | 98.24% |
| Rejected Votes | 369 | 1.46% | 4,277 | 1.43% | 91,499 | 1.76% |
| Total Polled | 25,203 | 67.28% | 299,689 | 67.98% | 5,186,256 | 55.87% |
| Registered Electors | 37,459 | | 440,836 | | 9,283,143 | |

=== 1982 Sri Lankan Presidential Election ===
| Party | Aranayaka | | Kegalle Electoral District | | Sri Lanka | |
| Party | Votes | % | Votes | % | Votes | % |
|---|---|---|---|---|---|---|
| UNP | 17,183 | 59.21% | 195,444 | 57.02% | 3,450,815 | 52.93% |
| SLFP | 10,433 | 35.95% | 126,538 | 36.92% | 2,546,348 | 39.05% |
| JVP | 1,197 | 4.12% | 13,706 | 4.00% | 273,428 | 4.19% |
| Other Parties (with < 1%) | 209 | 0.72% | 7,074 | 2.06% | 249,460 | 3.83% |
| Valid Votes | 29,022 | 99.25% | 342,762 | 98.69% | 6,520,156 | 98.78% |
| Rejected Votes | 219 | 0.75% | 4,537 | 1.31% | 80,470 | 1.22% |
| Total Polled | 29,241 | 84.75% | 347,299 | 84.30% | 6,600,626 | 80.15% |
| Registered Electors | 34,504 | | 411,994 | | 8,235,358 | |

== Parliamentary Election Results ==
=== Summary ===
The winner of Aranayaka has matched the final country result 6 out of 7 times. Hence, Aranayaka is a Bellwether for Parliamentary Elections.

| Year | Aranayaka | Kegalle Electoral District | MAE % | Sri Lanka | MAE % |
|---|---|---|---|---|---|
| 2015 | UNP | UNP | 1.56% | UNP | 3.21% |
| 2010 | UPFA | UPFA | 2.83% | UPFA | 6.80% |
| 2004 | UPFA | UPFA | 0.89% | UPFA | 4.88% |
| 2001 | UNP | UNP | 3.75% | UNP | 3.88% |
| 2000 | PA | PA | 2.76% | PA | 3.67% |
| 1994 | UNP | UNP | 1.36% | PA | 4.96% |
| 1989 | UNP | UNP | 3.37% | UNP | 7.12% |
| Matches/Mean MAE | 6/7 | 6/7 | 2.36% | 7/7 | 4.93% |

=== 2015 Sri Lankan Parliamentary Election ===
| Party | Aranayaka | | Kegalle Electoral District | | Sri Lanka | |
| Party | Votes | % | Votes | % | Votes | % |
|---|---|---|---|---|---|---|
| UNP | 19,192 | 51.25% | 247,467 | 49.52% | 5,098,916 | 45.77% |
| UPFA | 16,457 | 43.95% | 227,208 | 45.47% | 4,732,664 | 42.48% |
| JVP | 1,250 | 3.34% | 18,394 | 3.68% | 544,154 | 4.88% |
| Other Parties (with < 1%) | 548 | 1.46% | 6,661 | 1.33% | 101,045 | 0.91% |
| Valid Votes | 37,447 | 96.20% | 499,730 | 96.35% | 11,140,333 | 95.35% |
| Rejected Votes | 1,458 | 3.75% | 18,770 | 3.62% | 516,926 | 4.42% |
| Total Polled | 38,928 | 73.16% | 518,674 | 79.81% | 11,684,111 | 77.66% |
| Registered Electors | 53,207 | | 649,878 | | 15,044,490 | |

=== 2010 Sri Lankan Parliamentary Election ===
| Party | Aranayaka | | Kegalle Electoral District | | Sri Lanka | |
| Party | Votes | % | Votes | % | Votes | % |
|---|---|---|---|---|---|---|
| UPFA | 19,758 | 69.91% | 242,463 | 66.89% | 4,846,388 | 60.38% |
| UNP | 7,396 | 26.17% | 104,925 | 28.95% | 2,357,057 | 29.37% |
| DNA | 997 | 3.53% | 13,518 | 3.73% | 441,251 | 5.50% |
| Other Parties (with < 1%) | 112 | 0.40% | 1,549 | 0.43% | 33,973 | 0.42% |
| Valid Votes | 28,263 | 93.58% | 362,455 | 93.32% | 8,026,322 | 96.03% |
| Rejected Votes | 1,938 | 6.42% | 25,965 | 6.68% | 581,465 | 6.96% |
| Total Polled | 30,201 | 58.77% | 388,420 | 60.93% | 8,358,246 | 59.29% |
| Registered Electors | 51,391 | | 637,524 | | 14,097,690 | |

=== 2004 Sri Lankan Parliamentary Election ===
| Party | Aranayaka | | Kegalle Electoral District | | Sri Lanka | |
| Party | Votes | % | Votes | % | Votes | % |
|---|---|---|---|---|---|---|
| UPFA | 16,911 | 49.94% | 214,267 | 50.88% | 4,223,126 | 45.70% |
| UNP | 15,321 | 45.25% | 186,641 | 44.32% | 3,486,792 | 37.73% |
| JHU | 1,458 | 4.31% | 18,034 | 4.28% | 552,723 | 5.98% |
| Other Parties (with < 1%) | 172 | 0.51% | 2,187 | 0.52% | 59,247 | 0.64% |
| Valid Votes | 33,862 | 94.34% | 421,134 | 94.25% | 9,241,931 | 94.52% |
| Rejected Votes | 2,032 | 5.66% | 25,685 | 5.75% | 534,452 | 5.47% |
| Total Polled | 35,894 | 73.66% | 446,816 | 78.35% | 9,777,821 | 75.74% |
| Registered Electors | 48,731 | | 570,299 | | 12,909,631 | |

=== 2001 Sri Lankan Parliamentary Election ===
| Party | Aranayaka | | Kegalle Electoral District | | Sri Lanka | |
| Party | Votes | % | Votes | % | Votes | % |
|---|---|---|---|---|---|---|
| UNP | 18,044 | 53.29% | 208,104 | 49.36% | 4,086,026 | 45.62% |
| PA | 12,263 | 36.22% | 170,901 | 40.53% | 3,330,815 | 37.19% |
| JVP | 3,161 | 9.34% | 36,711 | 8.71% | 815,353 | 9.10% |
| Other Parties (with < 1%) | 389 | 1.15% | 5,924 | 1.40% | 123,245 | 1.38% |
| Valid Votes | 33,857 | 94.88% | 421,640 | 94.90% | 8,955,844 | 94.77% |
| Rejected Votes | 1,827 | 5.12% | 22,669 | 5.10% | 494,009 | 5.23% |
| Total Polled | 35,684 | 74.89% | 444,309 | 80.10% | 9,449,878 | 76.03% |
| Registered Electors | 47,648 | | 554,698 | | 12,428,762 | |

=== 2000 Sri Lankan Parliamentary Election ===
| Party | Aranayaka | | Kegalle Electoral District | | Sri Lanka | |
| Party | Votes | % | Votes | % | Votes | % |
|---|---|---|---|---|---|---|
| PA | 18,340 | 52.68% | 201,114 | 48.88% | 3,899,329 | 45.33% |
| UNP | 14,160 | 40.67% | 175,627 | 42.69% | 3,451,765 | 40.12% |
| JVP | 1,688 | 4.85% | 22,028 | 5.35% | 518,725 | 6.03% |
| Other Parties (with < 1%) | 627 | 1.80% | 12,643 | 3.07% | 419,507 | 4.88% |
| Valid Votes | 34,815 | N/A | 411,412 | N/A | 8,602,617 | N/A |

=== 1994 Sri Lankan Parliamentary Election ===
| Party | Aranayaka | | Kegalle Electoral District | | Sri Lanka | |
| Party | Votes | % | Votes | % | Votes | % |
|---|---|---|---|---|---|---|
| UNP | 17,392 | 52.58% | 203,938 | 51.24% | 3,498,370 | 44.04% |
| PA | 15,383 | 46.50% | 190,689 | 47.91% | 3,887,805 | 48.94% |
| Other Parties (with < 1%) | 304 | 0.92% | 3,383 | 0.85% | 90,078 | 1.13% |
| Valid Votes | 33,079 | 95.92% | 398,010 | 95.89% | 7,943,688 | 95.20% |
| Rejected Votes | 1,406 | 4.08% | 17,043 | 4.11% | 400,395 | 4.80% |
| Total Polled | 34,485 | 81.45% | 415,053 | 80.78% | 8,344,095 | 74.75% |
| Registered Electors | 42,338 | | 513,825 | | 11,163,064 | |

=== 1989 Sri Lankan Parliamentary Election ===
| Party | Aranayaka | | Kegalle Electoral District | | Sri Lanka | |
| Party | Votes | % | Votes | % | Votes | % |
|---|---|---|---|---|---|---|
| UNP | 16,302 | 63.43% | 174,334 | 61.12% | 2,838,005 | 50.71% |
| SLFP | 8,682 | 33.78% | 80,668 | 28.28% | 1,785,369 | 31.90% |
| ELJP | 479 | 1.86% | 14,056 | 4.93% | 67,723 | 1.21% |
| Other Parties (with < 1%) | 239 | 0.93% | 16,196 | 5.68% | 232,463 | 4.15% |
| Valid Votes | 25,702 | 92.14% | 285,254 | 93.95% | 5,596,468 | 93.87% |
| Rejected Votes | 2,191 | 7.86% | 18,362 | 6.05% | 365,563 | 6.13% |
| Total Polled | 27,893 | 75.98% | 303,616 | 69.46% | 5,962,031 | 63.60% |
| Registered Electors | 36,713 | | 437,131 | | 9,374,164 | |

== Demographics ==
=== Ethnicity ===
The Aranayaka Polling Division has a Sinhalese majority (90.1%) . In comparison, the Kegalle Electoral District (which contains the Aranayaka Polling Division) has a Sinhalese majority (85.5%)

Ethnicity in Aranayaka
1. Sinhalese (90.1%)
2. Moor (7.60%)
3. Sri Lankan Tamil (1.60%)
4. Other (0.80%)

=== Religion ===
The Aranayaka Polling Division has a Buddhist majority (90.0%) . In comparison, the Kegalle Electoral District (which contains the Aranayaka Polling Division) has a Buddhist majority (84.4%)

Religion in Aranayaka
1. Buddhist (90.0%)
2. Muslim (7.60%)
3. Hindu (1.90%)
4. Other (0.50%)
