= Gamini Rathnayake =

Sri Lankan politician

Hon. Gamini Rathnayake MP

Member of Parliament for National List
- Incumbent
- Assumed office 21 November 2024

Member of Parliament for Kegalle District
- In office 2001–2010

Personal details
- Party: Janatha Vimukthi Peramuna
- Other political affiliations: National People's Power

R. M. Gamini Rathnayake is a Sri Lankan politician and National List Member of the Parliament of Sri Lanka. He previously represented the Janatha Vimukthi Peramuna in parliament from 2001 to 2010 from the Kegalle District.
