= Sagarika Athauda =

Sri Lankan politician

Sagarika Athauda is a Sri Lankan politician. She was elected to the Sri Lankan Parliament from Kegalle Electoral District as a member of the National People's Power.
