= Kanchana Welipitiya =

Sri Lankan politician

Kanchana Welipitiya is a Sri Lankan politician. She was elected to the Sri Lankan Parliament from Kegalle Electoral District as a member of the National People's Power
