= Saliya Pieris =

Sri Lankan lawyer

Attorney-At-Law Saliya Pieris PC
- Born: Saliya Pieris
- Education: Sri Lanka Law College
- Occupation: Attorney at law
- Known for: President - BASL

Saliya Pieris, PC is a Sri Lankan lawyer, and 26th President of the Bar Association of Sri Lanka. Pieris is an Eisenhower Fellow. He is also an alumnus of the Dealing with the Past (DwP) Programme, Switzerland and IVLP, USA. He began his career as a prosecutor in the Attorney General’s Department. Later, he served as the First Chairman of the Office on Missing Persons from February 2018 to September 2020, which was created as part of Sri Lanka's reconciliation mechanism. Additionally, he was also a Member of the Human Rights Commission of Sri Lanka between October 2015 and March 2018.

LMD magazine titled him as "Sri Lankan of The Year", for his efforts during the 2022 protests that were held in Sri Lanka. The Hindu, highlighted his role in the Sri Lankan protests, acting as a voice of reason and ensuring citizens their Constitutional freedoms through awareness via the BASL.
