= Eardley Perera =

Sri Lankan lawyer (1925–2005)

Attorney-At-Law Eardley Perera
- Born: John Eardley Russel Perera; 20 October 1925; Moratuwa, Ceylon
- Died: 31 December 2004 (aged 79); Colombo, Sri Lanka
- Education: Sri Lanka Law College; St. Sebastian's College, Moratuwa
- Occupation: Attorney at law
- Known for: President - BASL (1977-78)

John Eardley Russel Perera PC (20 October 1925 - 31 December 2004) was a Sri Lankan lawyer and the 2nd president of the Bar Association of Sri Lanka (1977–78). He was a member of the Law Commission and the Council of Legal Education. Mr. Perera was in the first batch of President's Counsel appointed in 1981, having refused silk as a Queen's Counsel in 1967.

== Early life and education ==
Born on 20 October 1925, in Moratuwa, he was the third son, of Mr. and Mrs. C.S.A. Perera. Perera received his initial education at St. Bridget’s Convent in Colombo and subsequently attended St. Sebastian’s College for the latter.

His father was a Proctor of the Supreme Court and Notary Public, his elder brother Herman J.C. Perera was a proctor and was also a subsequent BASL President (being the only Proctor to do so), and President of the Incorporated Law Society of Ceylon, and his uncles Shelton de Silva and Andrew de Silva were leading lawyers as well. Eardley and Herman are only two brothers to ever become BASL Presidents history.

== Legal career ==
In 1944, Perera enrolled in the Ceylon Law College. Then after passing his Advocates’ Examinations, he was admitted to the Bar on 24 August 1948, after doing his apprenticeship in the Chambers of Mr. Nihal Gunasekera.

In 1977, he was elected as the 2nd President of the Bar Association of Sri Lanka (BASL) and at the time was the senior most Past President of the BASL following the death of Dr. Hector Wilfred Jayewardene Q.C.

In 1967, Perera was offered the honour of being appointed Queen’s Counsel but declined it. However, he was appointed as a President's Counsel in 1978 when the practice was re-commenced under the new Constitution.

== Family ==
Perera had 5 children, Charith, Surith, Ravith, Preemali and Vijiththree. 3 Perera's children Ravith, Preemali and Vijith are also lawyers.

== Death and legacy ==
Perera died on 31 December 2005, in his memory a bust of Perera was unveiled by Chief Justice Asoka de Silva at the Colombo Law Library.
