= Udayakantha Gunathilaka =

Sri Lankan politician

Hon. Udayakantha Gunathilaka MP
- උදයකාන්ත ගුණතිලක உதயகாந்த குணதிலகே

Member of the Parliament of Sri Lanka
- Incumbent
- Assumed office 2020
- Constituency: Kegalle District

Member of the Sabaragamuwa Provincial Council
- In office 2012–2017
- Constituency: Kegalle District
- In office 1999–2008

Personal details
- Born: Koswatta Ralalage Udayakantha Gunathilaka; 3 May 1965 (age 60)
- Party: Sri Lanka Podujana Peramuna
- Other political affiliations: Sri Lanka People's Freedom Alliance

Koswatta Ralalage Udayakantha Gunathilaka (born 3 May 1965) is a Sri Lankan politician, former provincial councillor and Member of Parliament.

Gunathilaka was born on 3 May 1965. He was a member of Warakapola Divisional Council and the Sabaragamuwa Provincial Council. He contested the 2020 parliamentary election as a Sri Lanka People's Freedom Alliance electoral alliance candidate in Kegalle District and was elected to the Parliament of Sri Lanka.

Electoral history of Udayakantha Gunathilaka
Election	Constituency	Party	Alliance	Votes	Result
1999 provincial	Kegalle District		People's Alliance	20,347	Elected
2004 provincial	Kegalle District		United People's Freedom Alliance	20,419	Elected
2008 provincial	Kegalle District		United People's Freedom Alliance		Not elected
2012 provincial	Kegalle District		United People's Freedom Alliance	21,490	Elected
2020 parliamentary	Kegalle District	Sri Lanka Podujana Peramuna	Sri Lanka People's Freedom Alliance	46,628	Elected
