= List of non-governmental organisations in Bangladesh =

This article is a list of domestic and international non-governmental organisations operating in the People's Republic of Bangladesh.

== A ==
- Academy for Educational Development
- Acid Survivors Foundation
- ActionAid, overcoming poverty
- Adventist Development and Relief Agency
- Association for Social Advancement

== B ==
- BRAC (NGO)
  - Bangladesh Rehabilitation Assistance Committee
  - Bangladesh Rural Advancement Committee
- Bangladesh Red Crescent Society
- Bangladesh Rehabilitation Centre for Trauma Victims
- BD Clean

== C ==
- CAFOD, working through partner agency Action on Disability and Development
- Caritas Internationalis
- Carter Center, democracy, health
- Centre for Law and Mediation (Bangladesh)
- Centre for Policy Dialogue
- Christian Commission for Development in Bangladesh
- CIRDAP

== F ==
- The Fred Hollows Foundation, eye health
- Friendship (NGO)

== H ==
- Habitat for Humanity (Habitat Bangladesh)
- Helen Keller International

== M ==
- Mastul Foundation

== O ==
- Odhikar, human rights
- Oxfam
- OrphansBD Foundation

== P ==
- Proshika, self-reliance for the poor
- Platform Bangladesh Foundation

== U ==
- UBINIG, Unnayan Bikalper Nitinirdharoni Gobeshona, research, policy, advocacy agency, opposes industrial agriculture
