= History of Bangladesh (1971–present) =

Post-independence history of Bangladesh

The history of Bangladesh (1971–present) refers to the period after the independence of Bangladesh from Pakistan.

== 1972–80: Post-independence era ==
=== Sheikh Mujibur Rahman administration ===
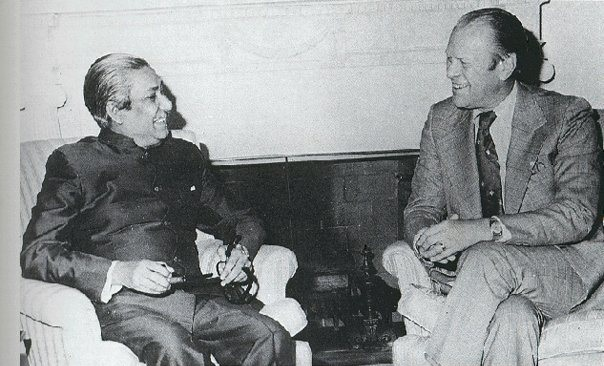
Bangladesh's founding leader Sheikh Mujibur Rahman, as prime minister, with US President Gerald Ford at the Oval Office in 1974

Upon his release on 10 January 1972, Sheikh Mujibur Rahman briefly assumed the provisional presidency and later took office as the prime minister, assuming control of government branches and decision-making. The politicians elected in 1970 formed the provisional parliament of the new state. The Mukti Bahini and other militias amalgamated to form a new Bangladeshi army to which Indian forces transferred control on 17 March. The government faced serious challenges, which included the rehabilitation of millions of people displaced in 1971, and organising the supply of food, health aids, and other necessities. The effects of the 1970 cyclone had not worn off, and the state's economy was severely declined by the conflict.

Rahman helped Bangladesh enter into the United Nations and the Non-Aligned Movement. He travelled to the United States, the United Kingdom, and other European nations to obtain humanitarian and developmental assistance for the nation. He signed a treaty of friendship with India, which pledged extensive economic and humanitarian assistance, and began training Bangladesh's security forces and government personnel. Rahman maintained diplomatic ties with Indira Gandhi, strongly praising India's decision to intercede, and established close ties with India. Major efforts were launched to rehabilitate an estimated 10 million refugees. The economy began recovering, and a famine was prevented. A constitution was proclaimed in 1972, and elections were held, which resulted in Rahman and his party winning a landslide victory. He further outlined state programmes to expand primary education, sanitation, food, healthcare, water, and electricity supply across the country. A five-year plan released in 1973 focused state investments on agriculture, rural infrastructure, and cottage industries.

From March 1974 to December 1974, what is described by historians as one of the deadliest famines of the 20th century occurred in Bangladesh, when it is estimated that anywhere between 27,000 and 1,500,000 people perished from starvation. The first widespread reports of this famine started to emerge in March 1974, and the price of rice climbed significantly. Rangpur District of Bangladesh experienced the first signs of this famine.

=== Communist insurgency ===
At the height of Sheikh Mujibur Rahman's power, left-wing insurgents, organised by Jatiyo Samajtantrik Dal's armed wing Gonobahini, fought against the government of Sheikh Mujibur Rahman to establish a Marxist government.

The government responded by forming the Jatiya Rakkhi Bahini, which began a campaign of widespread human rights violations against the general populace. The force became involved in numerous charges of human rights abuses, including political killings, shootings by death squads, and rape. Members of the Jatiya Rakkhi Bahini were granted immunity from prosecution and other legal proceedings.

=== Bangladesh Krishak Sramik Awami League (BAKSAL) ===
According to Abdur Razzaq, the 1974 famine profoundly affected Rahman's views on governance, while political unrest gave rise to increasing violence. During the famine, 70,000 people were reported as dead with varying numbers on the death count. In response, he began increasing his powers. On 25 January 1975, Rahman declared a state of emergency, and his political supporters approved a constitutional amendment banning all opposition political parties. Rahman assumed the presidency and was given extraordinary powers. His political supporters amalgamated to form the only legalised political party, the Bangladesh Krishak Sramik Awami League, commonly known by its initials—BAKSAL. The party identified itself with the rural masses, farmers, and labourers, and took control of government machinery. It also launched major socialist programmes. Using government forces and the Rakkhi Bahini, Rahman suppressed any opposition to him. The Rakkhi Bahini and the police were accused of torturing suspects and political killings. While retaining support from many segments of the population, veterans of the 1971 war criticised Rahman for what was seen as a 'betrayal' of the causes of democracy and civil rights.

=== Assassination of Sheikh Mujibur Rahman and aftermath ===
On 15 August 1975, a group of junior army officers stormed the presidential residence with tanks and killed Rahman, his family, and his personal staff. Only his daughters, Sheikh Hasina and Sheikh Rehana, who were in West Germany, escaped. They were temporarily exiled from Bangladesh. The coup was planned by angered Awami League colleagues and military officers, which included Rahman's colleague and former confidant Khondaker Mostaq Ahmad, who became his immediate successor. There was speculation by journalist Lawrence Lifschultz, who accused the US Central Intelligence Agency of having instigated the plot. He alleged that the CIA was involved in the coup and assassination, relying on testimony from the then US ambassador in Dhaka, Eugene Boster.

Rahman's death caused the nation to go into many years of political violence. The coup leaders were soon overthrown, and a series of counter-coups and political assassinations led to a period of turmoil in the country. Order was largely restored after a coup in 1977 gave control to the army chief, Ziaur Rahman. Declaring himself president in 1978, Ziaur Rahman signed the Indemnity Ordinance, giving immunity from prosecution to the men who plotted Sheikh Mujibur Rahman's assassination and overthrow.

=== Military-Civil administration under Ziaur Rahman, 1975–81 ===
Successive military coups resulted in the emergence of Army Chief of Staff General Ziaur Rahman ("Zia") as a primary political candidate. He pledged the army's support to the civilian government headed by President Chief Justice Sayem. Acting at Zia's behest, Sayem dissolved Parliament, promising fresh elections in 1977, and instituted martial law.

Acting behind the scenes of the Martial Law Administration (MLA), Zia sought to invigorate government policy and administration. While continuing the ban on political parties, he sought to restructure the demoralised bureaucracy, to begin new economic development programmes, and to emphasise family planning. In November 1976, Zia became Chief Martial Law Administrator (CMLA) and assumed the presidency upon Sayem's retirement five months later, promising national elections in 1978.

As president, Zia announced a 19-point programme of economic reform and began dismantling the MLA. Keeping his promise to hold elections, Zia won a five-year term in the June 1978 elections, with 76% of the vote. In November 1978, his government removed the remaining restrictions on political party activities in time for parliamentary elections in February 1979. These elections, which were contested by more than 30 parties, marked the transformation of Bangladesh's government from the MLA to a democratically elected, constitutional one. The Awami League and the Bangladesh Nationalist Party (BNP), founded by Zia, emerged as the two major parties.

In May 1981, Zia was assassinated in Chittagong by dissident elements of the military. The attempted coup never spread beyond the city, and the major conspirators were either taken into custody or killed. In accordance with the constitution, Vice-President Justice Abdul Sattar was sworn in as acting president. He declared a new national emergency and called for the election of a new president within six months. In the election, Sattar won as the BNP's candidate. President Sattar sought to follow the policies of his predecessor and retained essentially the same cabinet, but the army stepped in once again.

== 1980s ==
=== Administration of Hussain Muhammad Ershad, 1982–90 ===
Presidential Oath Ceremony after the 1986 election, with the Chief Justice and Military Secretary (1984–1989) Brigadier ABM Elias

Army Chief of Staff Lieutenant General Hussain Muhammad Ershad assumed power in a bloodless coup on 24 March 1982, citing the "grave political, economic, and societal crisis" that the nation was in. This move was not unanticipated, as Ershad had previously publicly expressed dissatisfaction with the ageing Sattar (who was over 75 years old) and his handling of national affairs, in addition to his refusal to allow the army more participation in politics. Like his predecessors, Ershad suspended the constitution and—citing pervasive corruption, ineffectual government, and economic mismanagement—declared martial law. Among his first actions were to privatise the largely state-owned economy (up to 70 per cent of industry was in public ownership) and encourage private investment in heavy industries along with light manufacturing, raw materials, and newspapers. Foreign companies were invited to invest in Bangladeshi industry as well, and stiff protectionist measures were put in place to safeguard manufacturing. All political parties and trade unions were banned for the time being, with the death penalty to be administered for corruption and political agitation. Ershad's takeover was initially viewed as a positive development, as Bangladesh was in a state of serious economic difficulty after Zia's death and political turmoil.

Two weeks before the coup in March, Prime Minister Shah Azizur Rahman announced that the country was facing significant food shortages. The government also faced a severe budget deficit to the tune of 4 billion taka (approximately $260 million in 1980), and the IMF declared that it would not provide any more loans until Bangladesh paid down some of its existing debts. The following year, Ershad assumed the presidency, retaining his positions as army chief and CMLA. During most of 1984, Ershad sought the opposition parties' participation in local elections under martial law. The opposition's refusal to participate, however, forced Ershad to abandon these plans. Ershad sought public support for his regime in a national referendum on his leadership in March 1985. He won overwhelmingly, although turnout was small. Two months later, Ershad held elections for local council chairmen. Pro-government candidates won a majority of the posts, setting in motion the president's ambitious decentralisation programme. Political life was further liberalised in early 1986, and additional political rights, including the right to hold large public rallies, were restored. At the same time, the Jatiya Party (Ershad), designed as Ershad's political vehicle for the transition from martial law, was established.

Despite a boycott by the BNP, led by President Zia's widow, Khaleda Zia, parliamentary elections were held on schedule in May 1986. The Jatiya Party won 153 of the 330 elected seats in the National Assembly. The Awami League participated in the elections, led by the late Sheikh Mujibur Rahman's daughter, Sheikh Hasina, who was the leader of the opposition against Ershad.

Ershad resigned as Army Chief of Staff and retired from military service in preparation for the presidential elections, scheduled for October. Protesting that martial law was still in effect, both the BNP and the Awami League refused to put up opposing candidates. Ershad reportedly received 84% of the vote. Although Ershad's government claimed a turnout of more than 50%, opposition leaders and much of the foreign press estimated a far lower percentage and alleged voting irregularities.

Ershad continued his stated commitment to lift martial law. In November 1986, his government mustered the necessary two-thirds majority in the National Assembly to amend the constitution and confirm the previous actions of the martial law regime. The president then lifted martial law, and the opposition parties took their elected seats in the National Assembly.

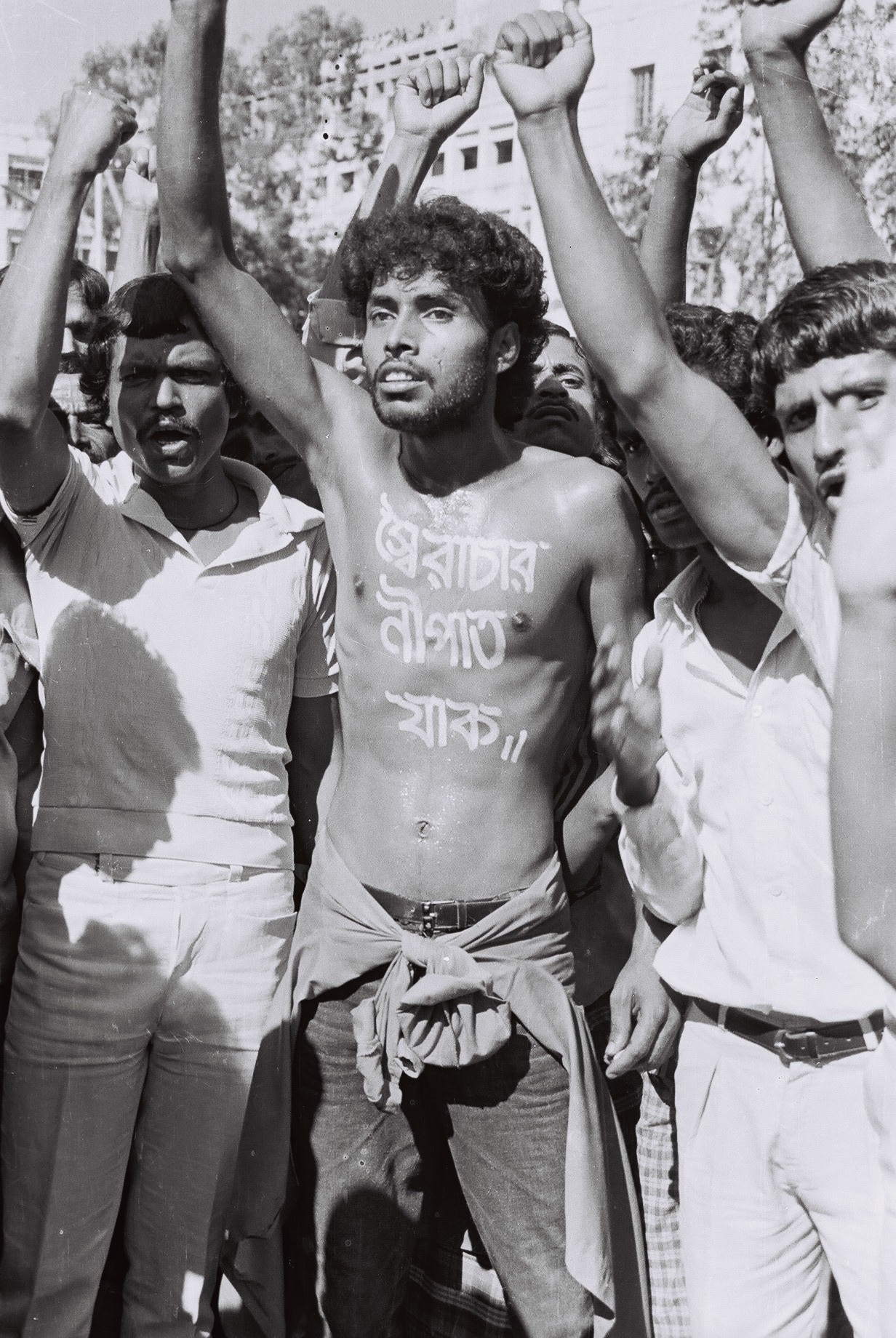
Bangladeshi pro-democracy activist Noor Hossain photographed by Dinu Alam with the words "Let tyranny die!" before he was killed, protesting the autocratic rule of Hussain Muhammad Ershad.

In July 1987, after the government hastily pushed through a controversial legislative bill to include military representation on local administrative councils, the opposition walked out of Parliament. Passage of the bill helped spark an opposition movement that quickly gathered momentum, uniting Bangladesh's opposition parties for the first time. The government began to arrest scores of opposition activists under the country's Special Powers Act of 1974. Despite these arrests, opposition parties continued to organise protest marches and nationwide strikes. After declaring a state of emergency, Ershad dissolved Parliament and scheduled fresh elections for March 1988.

All major opposition parties refused government overtures to participate in these polls, maintaining that the government was incapable of holding free and fair elections. Despite the opposition boycott, the government proceeded. The ruling Jatiya Party won 251 of the 300 seats. The Parliament, while still regarded by the opposition as an illegitimate body, held its sessions as scheduled, and passed numerous bills, including, in June 1988, a controversial constitutional amendment making Islam Bangladesh's state religion and a provision for setting up High Court benches in major cities outside of Dhaka. While Islam remains the state religion, the provision for decentralising the High Court division has been struck down by the Supreme Court.

By 1989, the domestic political situation in the country seemed to have quieted down. The local council elections were generally considered by international observers to have been less violent and more free and fair than previous elections. However, opposition to Ershad's rule began to regain momentum, escalating by the end of 1990 in frequent general strikes, increased campus protests, public rallies, and a general disintegration of law and order.

=== Devolution and Local Government Act ===
To improve rural and local administration, Ershad introduced the upazila and Zila Parishad system. He held the "first democratic elections for these village councils" in 1985.

== 1990s ==
=== Transition to democracy ===
A broad coalition of political parties united against Ershad. Khaleda Zia, led the Bangladesh Nationalist Party, which allied with the Bangladesh Awami League, led by Sheikh Hasina. Jamaat-e-Islami Bangladesh and other Islamic parties and alliances joined the opposition ranks. Although the parliament was dissolved, fresh elections were boycotted by the opposition, including Awami League and Jamaat. Students launched an intensifying opposition campaign, which ultimately forced Ershad to step down. On 6 December 1990, Ershad offered his resignation. On 27 February 1991, after two months of widespread civil unrest, an interim government headed by Acting President Chief Justice Shahabuddin Ahmed oversaw what most observers, including internal monitors, generally categorize as the nation's most free and fair elections to that date.

=== First Khaleda administration, 1991–96 ===
The centre-right Bangladesh Nationalist Party won a plurality of seats and formed a government with support from the Islamic party Jamaat-e-Islami, with Khaleda Zia, obtaining the post of prime minister. Only four parties had more than 10 members elected to the 1991 Parliament: the BNP, led by Prime Minister Khaleda Zia; the Awami League, led by Sheikh Hasina; the Jamaat-e-Islami, led by Ghulam Azam; and the Jatiya Party, led by acting chairman Mizanur Rahman Choudhury while its founder, former President Ershad, served out a prison sentence on corruption charges. The electorate approved further changes to the constitution, formally re-creating a parliamentary system and returning governing power to the office of the prime minister, as in Bangladesh's original 1972 constitution. In October 1991, members of Parliament elected a new head of state, President Abdur Rahman Biswas.

In March 1994, controversy over a parliamentary by-election, which the opposition claimed the government had rigged, led to an indefinite boycott of Parliament by the entire opposition. The opposition also began a programme of repeated general strikes to press its demand that Khaleda Zia's government resign and a caretaker government supervise a general election. Efforts to mediate the dispute, under the auspices of the Commonwealth Secretariat, failed. After another attempt at a negotiated settlement failed narrowly in late December 1994, the opposition resigned en masse from Parliament. The opposition then continued a campaign of marches, demonstrations, and strikes in an effort to force the government to resign. The opposition, including the Bangladesh Awami League, led by Sheikh Hasina, pledged to boycott national elections scheduled for 15 February 1996.

In February Khaleda Zia was re-elected by a landslide in voting boycotted and denounced as unfair by the three main opposition parties. In March 1996, following escalating political turmoil, the sitting Parliament enacted a constitutional amendment to allow a neutral caretaker government to assume power and conduct new parliamentary elections; former chief justice Muhammad Habibur Rahman was named chief adviser (a position equivalent to Prime Minister) in the interim government. New parliamentary elections were held in June 1996, and the Awami League won a plurality and formed the government with support from the Jatiya Party led by deposed president Hussain Muhammad Ershad; party leader Sheikh Hasina became Prime Minister of Bangladesh.

=== First Hasina administration, 1996–2001 ===
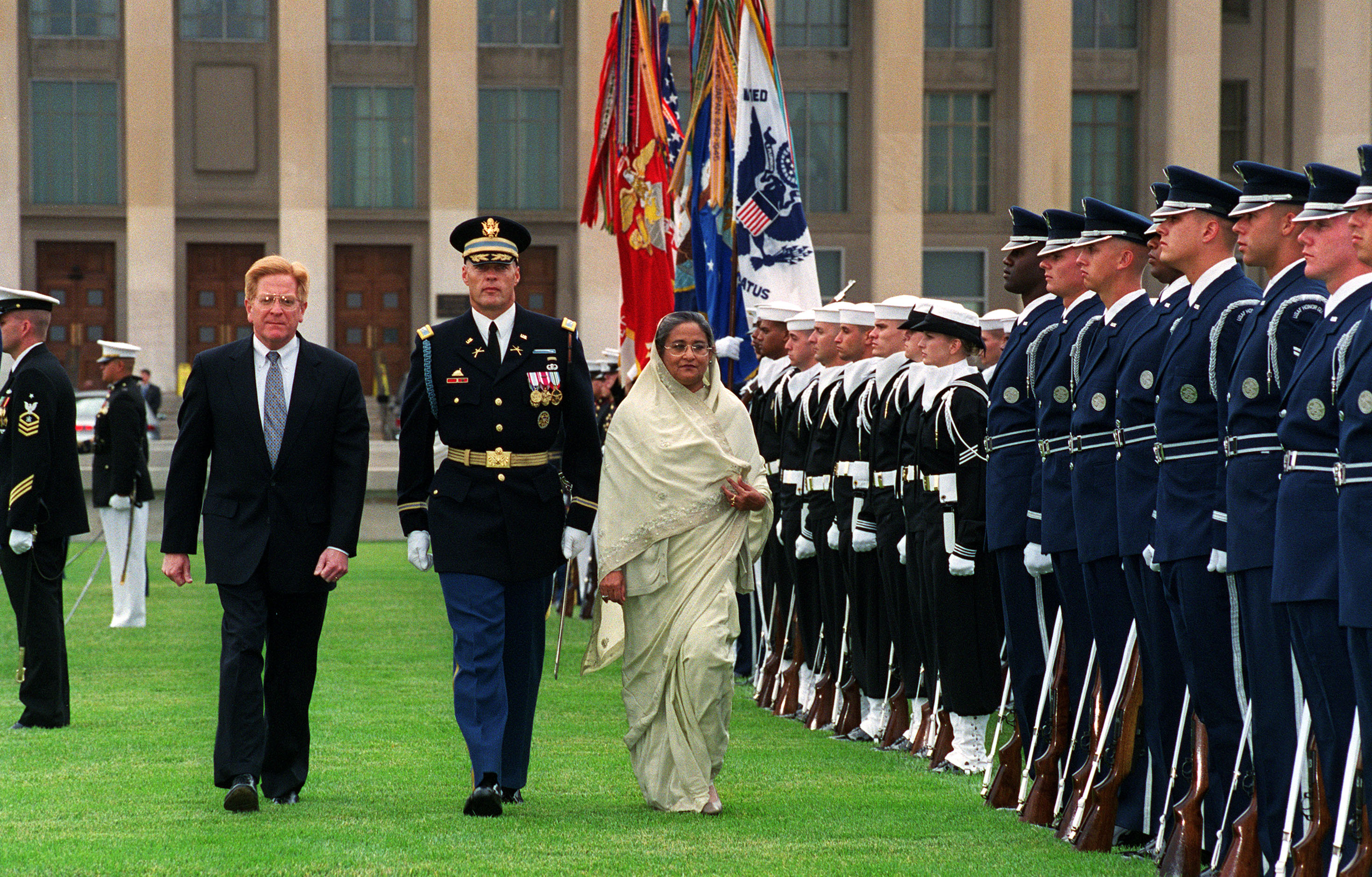
Prime Minister Sheikh Hasina inspects the ceremonial honour guard during a full honour arrival ceremony at the Pentagon on 17 October 2000.

Sheikh Hasina formed what she called a "Government of National Consensus" in June 1996, which included one minister from the Jatiya Party and another from the Jatiya Samajtantrik Dal. The Jatiya Party never entered into a formal coalition arrangement, and party president Hussain Muhammad Ershad withdrew his support from the government in September 1997. Only three parties had more than 10 members elected to the 1996 Parliament: the Awami League, BNP, and Jatiya Party. Jatiya Party president Ershad was released from prison on bail in January 1997.

International and domestic election observers found the June 1996 election free and fair, and ultimately, the Bangladesh Nationalist Party decided to join the new Parliament. The BNP soon charged that police and Bangladesh Awami League activists were engaged in large-scale harassment and jailing of opposition activists. At the end of 1996, the Bangladesh Nationalist Party staged a parliamentary walkout over this and other grievances but returned in January 1997 under a four-point agreement with the ruling party. The Bangladesh Nationalist Party asserted that this agreement was never implemented and later staged another walkout in August 1997. The Bangladesh Nationalist Party returned to Parliament under another agreement in March 1998.

In June 1999, the Bangladesh Nationalist Party and other opposition parties again began to abstain from attending Parliament. Opposition parties staged an increasing number of nationwide general strikes, rising from six days of general strikes in 1997 to 27 days in 1999. A four-party opposition alliance formed at the beginning of 1999 announced that it would boycott parliamentary by-elections and local government elections unless the government took steps demanded by the opposition to ensure electoral fairness. The government did not take these steps, and the opposition subsequently boycotted all elections, including municipal council elections in February 1999, several parliamentary by-elections, and the Chittagong City Corporation elections in January 2000.

In July 2001, the Bangladesh Awami League government stepped down to allow a caretaker government to preside over parliamentary elections. Political violence that had increased during the Bangladesh Awami League government's tenure continued to increase through the summer in the run up to the election. In August, Khaleda Zia and Sheikh Hasina agreed during a visit of former President Jimmy Carter to respect the results of the election, join Parliament win or lose, forswear the use of hartals (general strikes) as political tools, and, if successful in forming a government, allow for a more meaningful role for the opposition in Parliament. The caretaker government was successful in containing the violence, which allowed a parliamentary general election to be successfully held on 1 October 2001.

== 2000s ==
=== Second Khaleda administration, 2001–2006 ===
The Four Party Alliance, led by the Bangladesh Nationalist Party, won over a two-thirds majority in Parliament. Khaleda Zia was sworn in on 10 October 2001 as prime minister for the third time (first in 1991, second after the 15 February 1996 elections).

Despite her August 2001 pledge and all election monitoring groups declaring the election free and fair, Sheikh Hasina condemned the election, rejected the results, and boycotted Parliament. In 2002, however, she led her party legislators back to Parliament, but the Bangladesh Awami League again walked out in June 2003 to protest derogatory remarks about Hasina by a state minister and the allegedly partisan role of the parliamentary speaker. In June 2004, the Awami League returned to Parliament without having any of their demands met. They then attended Parliament irregularly before announcing a boycott of the entire June 2005 budget session.

On 17 August 2005, near-synchronized blasts of improvised explosive devices in 63 out of 64 administrative districts targeted mainly government buildings and killed two people. An extremist Islamist group named Jamaat-ul-Mujahideen Bangladesh (JMB) claimed responsibility for the blasts, which aimed to enforce the JMB's demand for a replacement of the secular legal system with Islamic sharia courts. Subsequent attacks on the courts in several districts killed 28 people, including judges, lawyers, and police personnel guarding the courts. A government campaign against the Islamic extremists led to the arrest of hundreds of senior and mid-level JMB leaders. Six high-ranking JMB leaders were tried and executed for their role in the murder of two judges; another leader was tried and sentenced to death in absentia in the same case.

In February 2006, the Awami League returned to Parliament, demanded early elections, and requested significant changes in the electoral and caretaker government systems to stop alleged moves by the ruling coalition to rig the next election. The Awami League blamed the BNP for several high-profile attacks on opposition leaders and asserted the BNP was bent on eliminating Sheikh Hasina and the Awami League as a viable force. The BNP and its allies accused the Awami League of maligning Bangladesh at home and abroad out of jealousy over the government's performance on development and economic issues. Dialogue between the secretaries general of the main ruling and opposition parties failed to sort out the electoral reform issues.

=== Political crisis and caretaker government, 2006–2008 ===
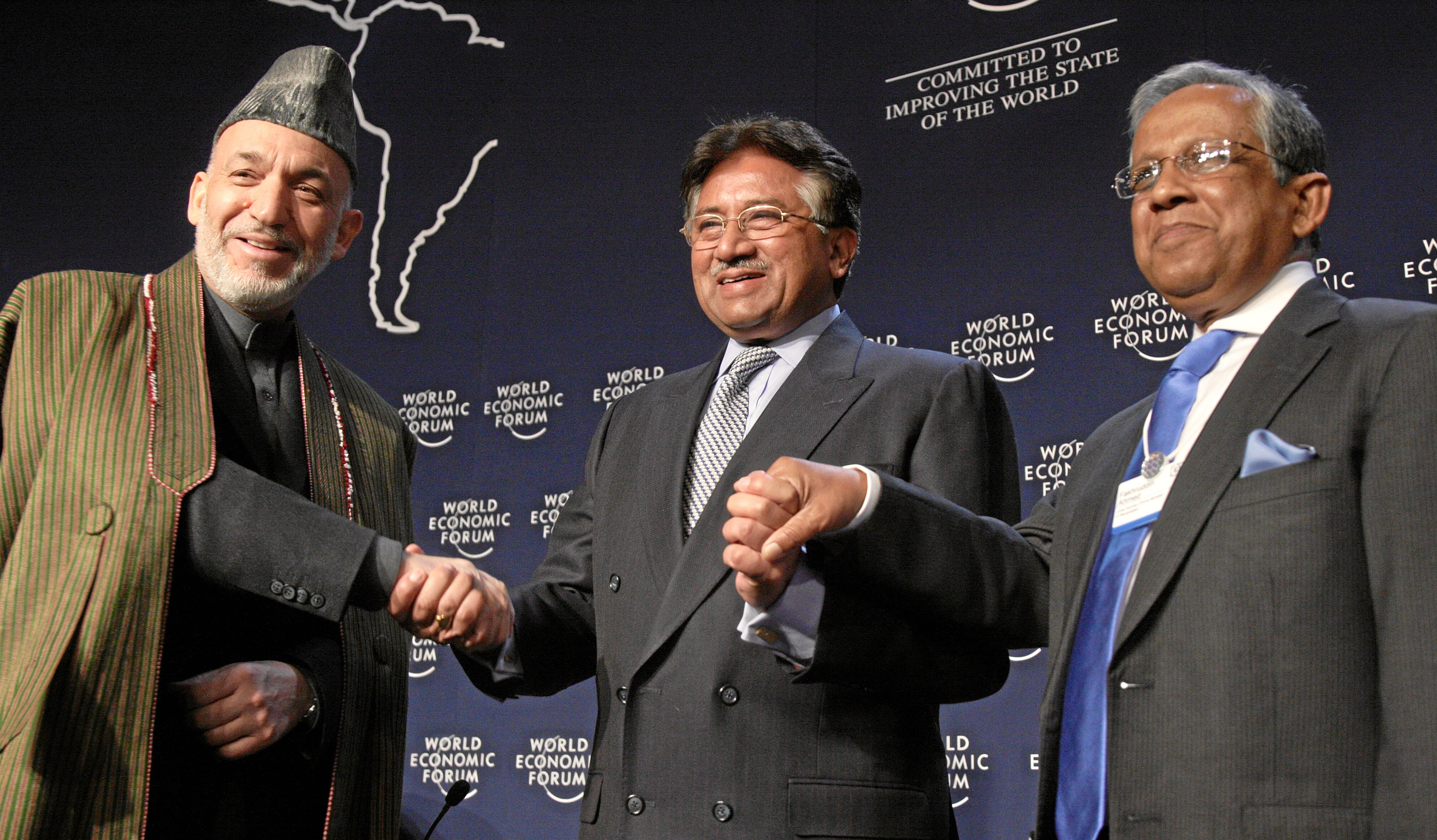
Hamid Karzai (left), Pervez Musharraf (center), and Fakhruddin Ahmed (right) at the Annual Meeting 2008 of the World Economic Forum in Davos, Switzerland

The months preceding the planned 22 January 2007 elections were filled with political unrest and controversy. Following the end of Khaleda Zia's government in late October 2006, there were protests and strikes, during which 40 people were killed in the following month, over uncertainty about who would head the caretaker government. The caretaker government had difficulty bringing all parties to the table. Awami League and its allies protested and alleged that the caretaker government favoured the BNP.

The interim period was marked by violence and strikes. Presidential Advisor Mukhlesur Rahman Chowdhury negotiated with Sheikh Hasina and Khaleda Zia and brought all the parties to the planned 22 January 2007 parliamentary elections. Later, Hussain Muhammad Ershad's nomination was cancelled; as a result, the Grand Alliance withdrew its candidates en masse on the last day possible. They demanded to have voters' lists published.

Later in the month, President Iajuddin Ahmed imposed a state of emergency. Iajuddin Ahmed resigned from the post of chief adviser under reported pressure from the Bangladesh Army, and appointed Fakhruddin Ahmed the new chief adviser. Political activity was prohibited. The military-backed government worked to develop graft and corruption cases against leaders and members of both major parties. In March 2007, Khaleda Zia's two sons, who both had positions in the Bangladesh Nationalist Party, were charged with corruption. Hasina was charged with graft and extortion in April 2007, and a day later, Khaleda Zia was charged with graft as well. There were attempts by Bangladesh Army chief Moeen U Ahmed, the head of the Anti-Terrorism division of the Directorate General of Forces Intelligence, Brigadier General ATM Amin, and Director of Directorate General of Forces Intelligence Brigadier General Chowdhury Fazlul Bari to remove Sheikh Hasina and Khaleda Zia from politics. Former army chief General Hasan Mashhud Chowdhury was made the head of the Bangladesh Anti Corruption Commission. The Anti Corruption Commission and the Bangladesh Election Commission were strengthened by the caretaker government. On 27 August 2007, violence broke out on the University of Dhaka campus between students and soldiers of the Bangladesh Army. Students called strikes and burned effigies of the army chief. Police attacked the students and physically assaulted Acting Vice-chancellor AFM Yusuf Haider and other faculty members of the University of Dhaka. Students were joined in demonstration by street vendors and slum residents who were evicted by the government. The Bangladesh Army agreed to the demands of the protesters and removed the army camp from the University of Dhaka campus. Students and teachers expressed the continued state of emergency in Bangladesh.

=== Second Hasina administration ===
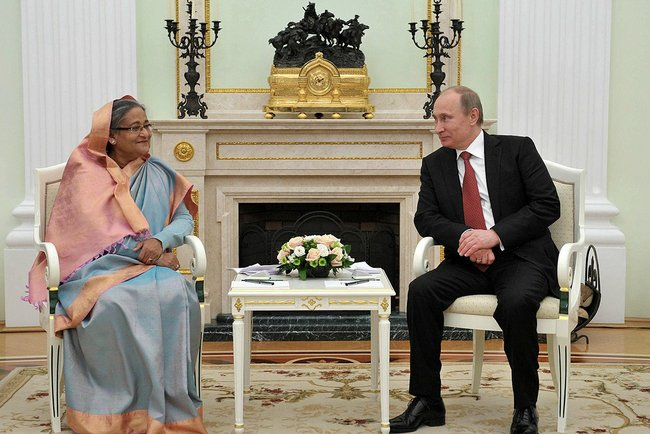
Sheikh Hasina with Vladimir Putin in Moscow

The Awami League won the national election on 29 December 2008 as part of a larger electoral alliance that also included the Jatiya Party led by former military ruler General Hussain Muhammad Ershad as well as some leftist parties. According to the official results, the Bangladesh Awami League won 230 out of 299 constituencies, and together with its allies, had a total of 262 parliamentary seats. The Awami League and its allies received 57% of the total votes cast. The AL alone got 48%, compared to 36% of the other major alliance led by the BNP, which by itself got 33% of the votes. Sheikh Hasina, as party head, became the new prime minister. Her term of office began on 7 January 2009, after Fakhruddin Ahmed. The new cabinet included many first-time ministers, including three women in prominent positions: Dipu Moni (Foreign Minister), Matia Chowdhury (Agriculture Minister), and Sahara Khatun (Home Minister). Younger MPs with a link to assassinated members of the 1972–1975 Awami League government are Syed Ashraful Islam, son of Syed Nazrul Islam; Sheikh Fazle Noor Taposh, son of Sheikh Fazlul Huq Moni; and Tanjim Ahmad Sohel Taj, son of Tajuddin Ahmad.

Since 2009, the Awami League government faced several major political challenges, including the BDR mutiny, power crisis, unrest in the garments industry and stock market fluctuations. Judicial achievements for the party included restoring the 1972 constitution (set by the first Awami League government), beginning war crimes trials, and a guilty verdict in the 1975 assassination trial. According to the Nielsen 2-year survey, 50 per cent felt the country was moving in the right direction, and 36 per cent gave the government a favourable rating. On 18 September 2012, the Bangladesh Supreme Court declared the caretaker government led by Fakhruddin Ahmed as unconstitutional.

=== Vision 2021 and Digital Bangladesh ===
Vision 2021 was the political manifesto of the Bangladesh Awami League party before winning the national elections of 2008. It stands as a political vision of Bangladesh for the year 2021, the golden jubilee of the nation. The policy has been criticized as a policy emblematic of technological optimism in the context of Bangladesh and the state repression of media, low internet penetration, and inadequate electricity generation.

Digital Bangladesh implies the broad use of computers, and embodies the modern philosophy of effective and useful use of technology in terms of implementing the promises in education, health, job placement and poverty reduction. The party underscored a changing attitude, positive thinking and innovative ideas for the successes of "Digital Bangladesh".

== 2010s ==
=== War crimes tribunal ===
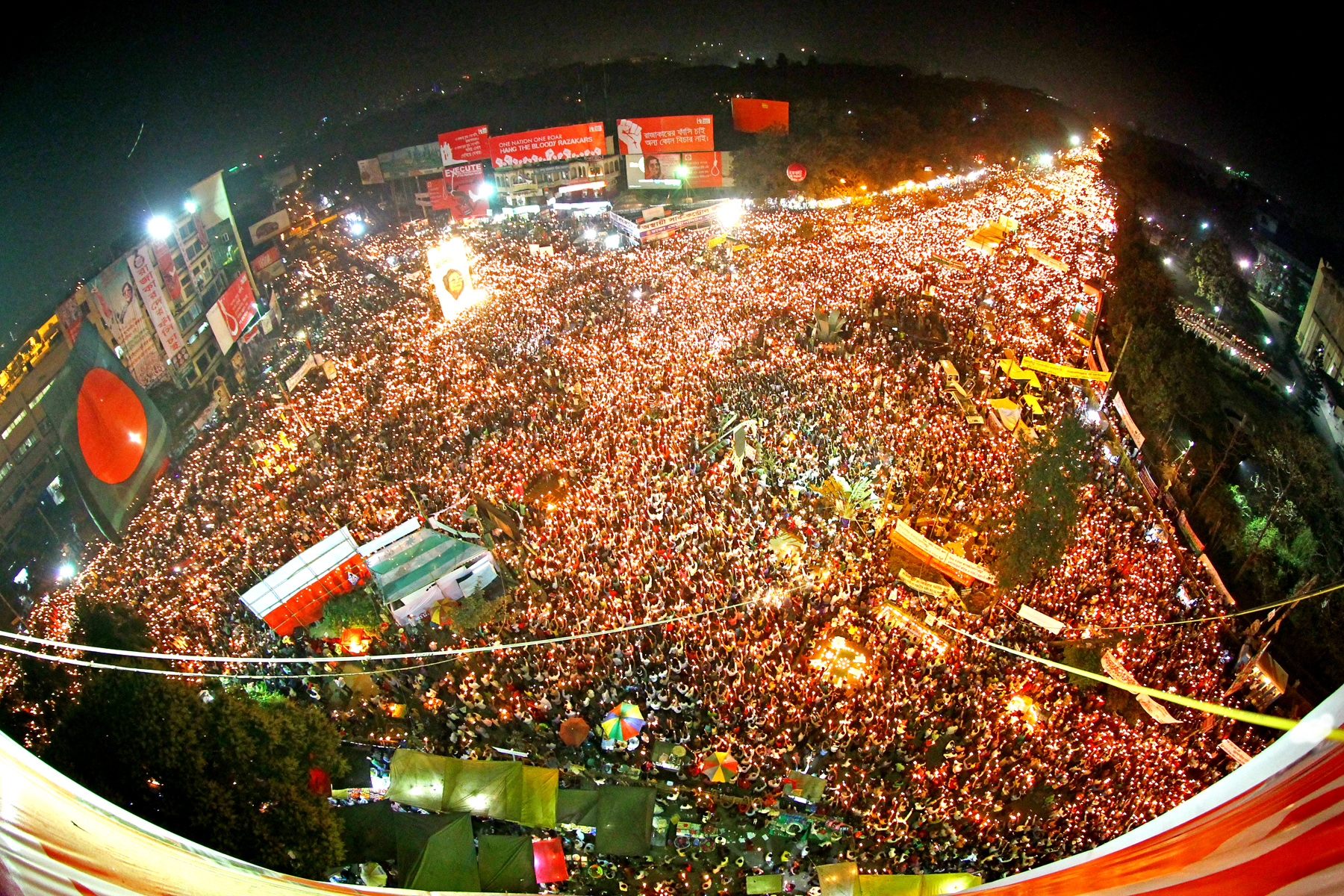
2013 Shahbag protests, Protests demanding the punishment for war criminals in Shahbagh, Bangladesh.

During the 2008 general election, the Awami League pledged to establish the tribunals in response to long-standing calls for trying war criminals. The first indictments were issued in 2010. However, the Pakistani military, who were the main combatants of the 1971 Liberation War, were not subject to the proceedings of the courts.

The government set up the tribunal after the Awami League won the general election in December 2008 with a more than two-thirds majority in parliament. The War Crimes Fact Finding Committee, tasked to investigate and find evidence, completed its report in 2008, identifying 1,600 suspects. Prior to the formation of the ICT, the United Nations Development Programme offered assistance in 2009 on the tribunal's formation. In 2009, the parliament amended the 1973 act that authorised such a tribunal to update it.

=== Third Hasina administration, 2014–2019 ===
A general election was held on 5 January 2014, in accordance with the constitutional requirement that the election must take place within the 90-day period before the expiration of the term of the parliament on 24 January 2014. The buildup to the election was marred by violence. The opposition BNP agitated for restoration of the caretaker government system, abolished in June 2011 when parliament, under Prime Minister Hasina, passed the 15th amendment of the constitution. Jamaat-e-Islami (JI), once a BNP ally, protested against the International Crimes Tribunal and its conviction and execution of JI leaders. The BNP and JI were among the 70 per cent of registered parties that boycotted the election.

The Jatiya Party threatened to boycott the election too, but was persuaded to participate. Out of 300 seats, 233 went to the AL, the Jatiya Party won 34, and the remainder were divided among minor parties and independent candidates. More than half of the seats, 153, were uncontested. According to The New York Times, voter turnout was low, at 20 per cent. Hasina was sworn in to lead the next government. She included three Jatiya Party members in her cabinet.

=== Attacks on secularists ===
From 2013 a number of secularist writers, bloggers and publishers in Bangladesh were killed or seriously injured in attacks perpetrated by extremists. The attacks took place at a time of growing tension between Bangladeshi secularists, who wanted the country to maintain its secularist tradition of separation of religion and state, and Islamists, who wanted an Islamic state. Tensions also rose as a result of the country's war crimes tribunal, which convicted several members of the opposition Islamist Jamaat-e-Islami party for crimes committed during Bangladesh's War of Independence in 1971. Secularists had been calling for harsher penalties for the convicted, with some calling for the Jamaat-e-Islami party itself to be outlawed, drawing the anger of the party's supporters. Responsibility for the attacks on secularists which subsequently occurred has been claimed by a number of militant groups including Ansarullah Bangla Team, who have frequently justified their attacks on the grounds that their victims are "atheists" and enemies of Islam. Four bloggers had been killed in 2015, but only four people were arrested in the murder cases.

=== Student protests against VAT on education ===
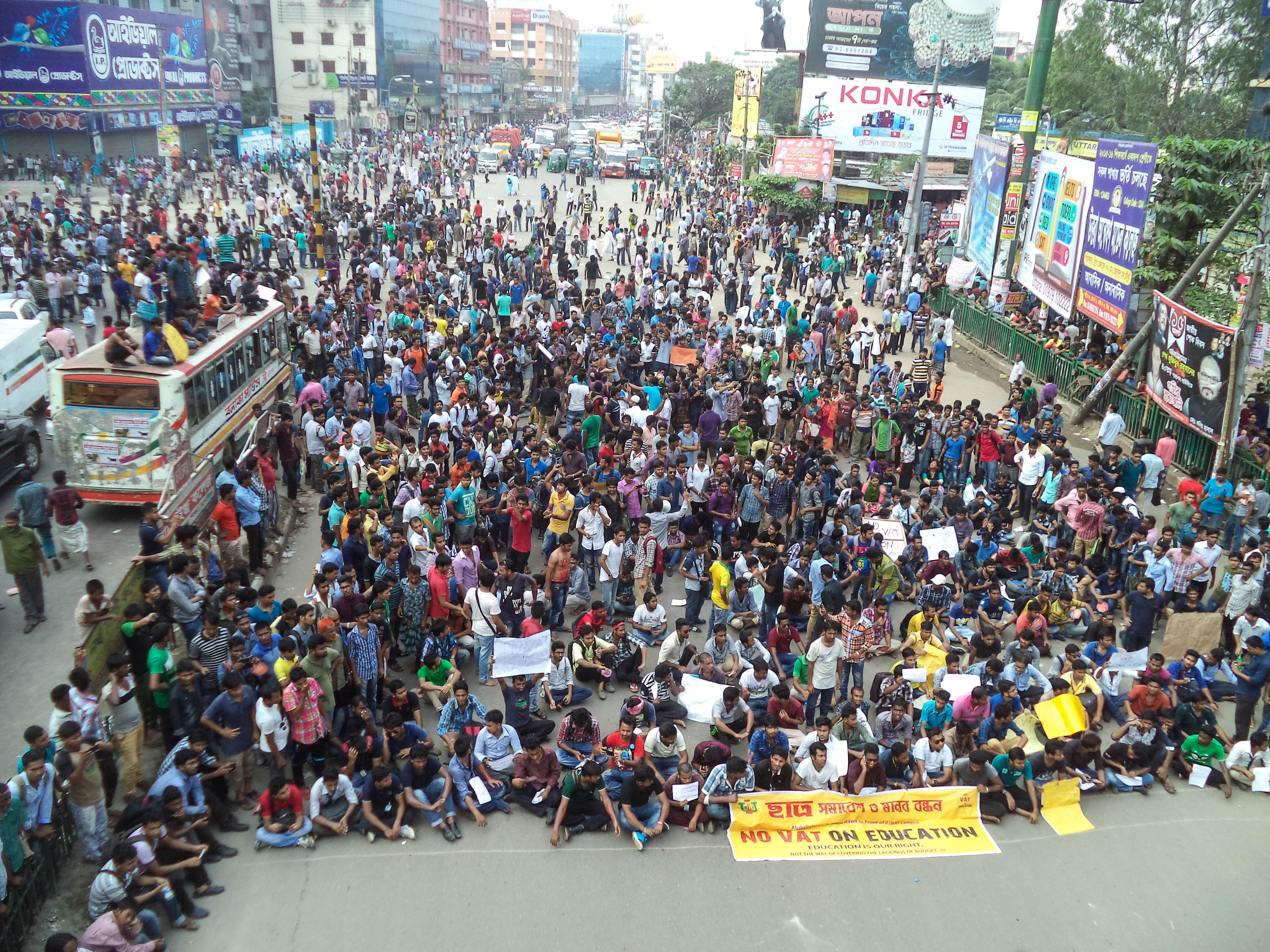
Private university students in Uttara, Dhaka protest VAT on tuition fees.

The 2015 Bangladesh student protests on "No VAT on Education" were protests by students of private universities in Bangladesh demanding the VAT imposed on higher education in private universities be eliminated. The Finance Minister of the Awami League government first introduced a 10% VAT upon higher education in private universities in the draft of budget of 2015–16. Following strong opposition, the VAT was reduced to 7.5%. The imposed VAT was withdrawn by the finance division after a cabinet meeting on 14 September 2015.

=== Quota Reform Movement ===
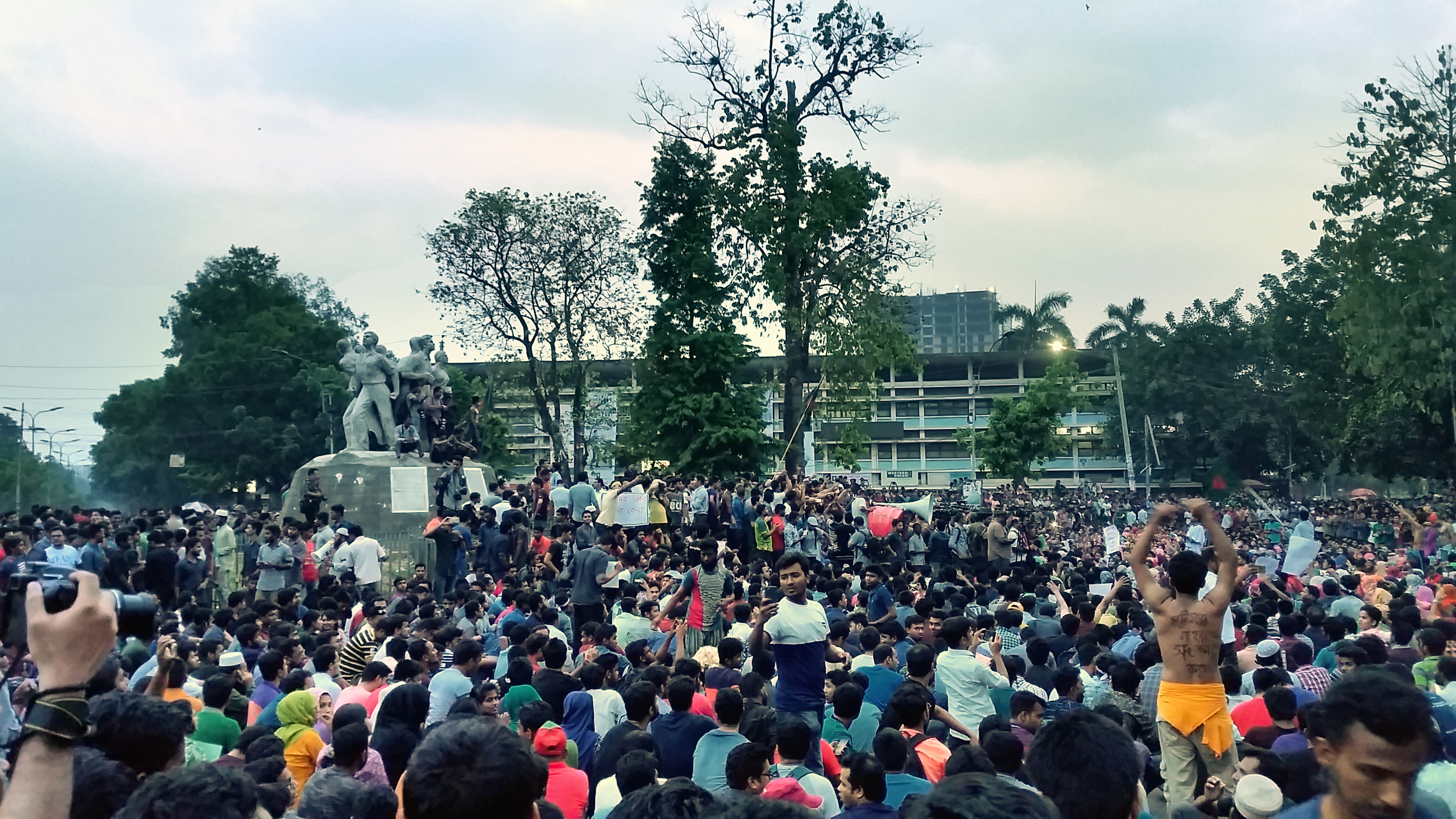
Quota reform protesters at University of Dhaka

The 2018 Bangladesh Quota Reform Movement was a movement demanding reforms in policies regarding recruitment in the Bangladesh government services. Bangladesh Sadharan Chhatra Adhikar Sangrakshan Parishad (Bangladesh General Students' Right Conservation Council) initiated movement initially began in Shahbag and on Dhaka University campus on 17 February 2018, and eventually spread country-wide by 8 April 2018. The movement rapidly attained popularity among students of different universities and colleges forcing the government to announce changes in its policy.

=== Road Safety Protests ===
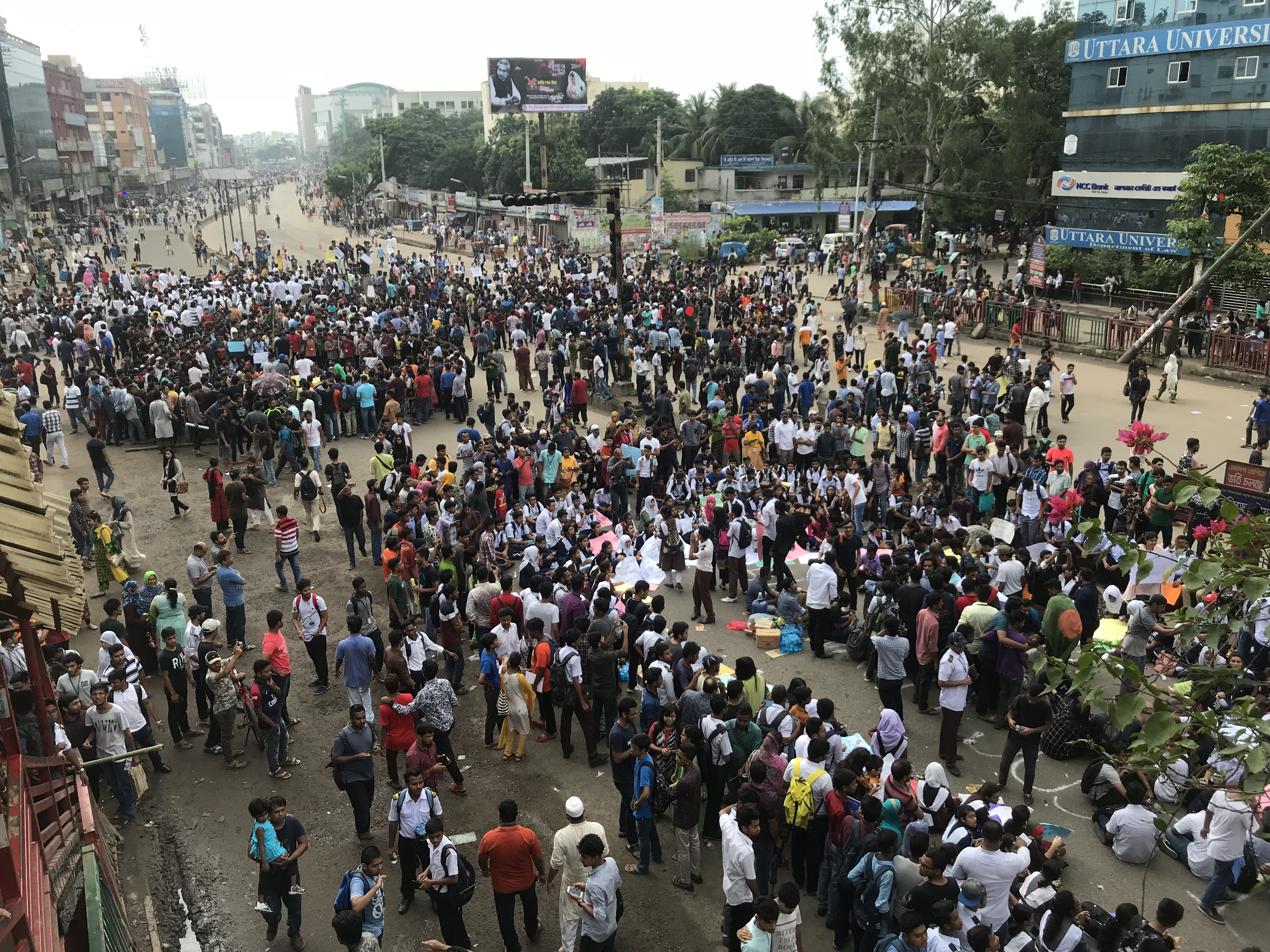
Students blocking a road in Uttara, North Dhaka, 2 August 2018

A series of public protests in Bangladesh advocating improved road safety were held from 29 July to 8 August 2018. They were sparked by the deaths of two high-school students in Dhaka struck by a bus operated by an unlicensed driver who was racing to collect passengers. The incident impelled students to demand safer roads and stricter traffic laws, and the demonstrations rapidly spread throughout Bangladesh.

The protests were peaceful until 2 August, when police attempted to disperse the demonstrators with tear gas and people believed to be members of a pro-government youth league attacked protesters and journalists. The government arrested several protesters and a photographer for giving an interview about the protests to international media. Various international organisations and high-profile figures expressed solidarity with the protesters. The governments response to the student protesters received high criticism both domestically and internationally.

The third Sheikh Hasina Cabinet approved on 6 August a draft traffic act stipulating capital punishment for intentional killing and a maximum five-year prison sentence for accidental killing with a motor vehicle. The protesters felt that the maximum five-year sentence was too light for accidental deaths due to reckless driving. By 8 August, the situation in the city had returned to normal, most students had returned to their classes and traffic had resumed as normal, with many sources stating that the nine-day protests were over.

=== Fourth Hasina administration ===
2018 Bangladeshi general election were held on 30 December 2018. The result was a landslide victory for the Awami League led by Sheikh Hasina. The elections were marred by violence and claims of vote rigging. Opposition leader Kamal Hossain rejected the results, calling it 'farcical' and demanding fresh elections to be held under a neutral government.

== 2020s ==
=== COVID-19 pandemic ===
The COVID-19 pandemic in Bangladesh was a part of the worldwide pandemic of coronavirus disease 2019 (COVID-19) caused by severe acute respiratory syndrome coronavirus 2 (SARS-CoV-2). The virus was confirmed to have spread to Bangladesh in March 2020. The first three known cases were reported on 8 March 2020 by the country's epidemiology institute, IEDCR. After that, the pandemic spread day by day over the whole nation and the number of affected people increased. Bangladesh was the second most affected country in South Asia, after India.

=== Mujib Year and Golden jubilee ===
The government of Bangladesh announced the commemoration of 2020–2021 as the Mujib Year (Bengali: মুজিব বর্ষ) on the occasion of the centennial birth anniversary of the founding leader of the country, Sheikh Mujibur Rahman . The year was celebrated from 17 March 2020 to 26 March 2021. The UN General Assembly, UNESCO decided to jointly celebrate the Mujib Year with Bangladesh at the UNESCO 40th General Assembly. The decision was made in the presence of all UNESCO members on 12–27 November in Paris, held on 25 November 2019.

In 2021, the "Bangla50" initiative was launched to celebrate 50 years of independence from Pakistan and in Bengali is called, "সুবর্ণ জয়ন্তী; Subarṇa jaẏantī" with a logo that spells "BD50". Several celebration programmes were held in countries including India, Russia, Germany, Sweden, Hungary, Poland, Nepal and Bhutan.

=== 2021 Bangladesh communal violence ===
From 13 to 19 October 2021 Muslim mobs instigated communal violence against Hindu communities across Bangladesh during the Durga Puja festival. More than 50 temples and makeshift worship arrangements were vandalised all over Bangladesh According to ASK aka Ain o Salish Kendra (আইন ও সালিশ কেন্দ্র) – a Bangladeshi legal aid and human rights organization; With 3,679 attacks in nine years (between January 2013 and September 2021), Bangladesh's Hindus at 'regular threat' of violence.

The Bangladesh government deployed paramilitary Bangladesh Border Guards forces in 22 of the 64 administrative districts of Bangladesh to quell violence against the Hindu community. As of 22 October 2021, at least 11 people have been killed across the country, including seven Hindus, in the "worst communal violence in years" as termed by The New York Times.

=== Smart Bangladesh ===
Smart Bangladesh is an initiative led by the Government of Bangladesh aiming to transform Bangladesh into a technologically advanced and sustainable society. Building on the foundation of the Vision 2021 initiative, Smart Bangladesh envisions the development of smart cities, smart agriculture, smart healthcare, smart education, smart energy, smart governance and smart institutions with the ultimate goal of creating a more prosperous, equitable, and sustainable future for the people of Bangladesh. The inauguration of the nation's elevated expressway marked a milestone toward the realization of a 'Smart Bangladesh'. Initiatives such as community and mobile clinics have been established to extend healthcare access, particularly in rural areas, with a focus on maternal health.

Although the day has been celebrated as Smart Bangladesh Day since 2022, the day was canceled by the interim government on 16 October 2024, after the fall of the Sheikh Hasina government on 5 August 2024.

=== 2024 Bangladeshi general election ===
In January 2024, Prime Minister Sheikh Hasina secured her fourth straight term in Bangladesh's controversial general election, which was boycotted by the main opposition Bangladesh Nationalist Party.

=== July Uprising ===
The July Uprising was a mass uprising in Bangladesh in 2024. It began as a quota reform movement to reform the quota rule regarding government jobs, after the Supreme Court of Bangladesh invalidated the government's 2018 circular regarding job quotas in the public sector. It began in early June 2024 and was led by the Students Against Discrimination. By early August, the movement evolved into a non-cooperation movement, ultimately leading to the ouster of the prime minister, Sheikh Hasina, who fled to India.

==== 2024 Bangladesh quota reform movement ====
The 2024 Bangladesh quota reform movement, was a series of anti-government and pro-democracy protests in Bangladesh, spearheaded primarily by university students. Initially focused on restructuring quota-based systems for government job recruitment, the movement expanded against what many perceive as an authoritarian government when they carried out the July massacre against protestors and civilians, most of whom were students.

==== Non-cooperation movement (2024) ====
The non-cooperation movement, also known as the one-point movement, was a pro-democratic disinvestment movement and mass uprising against the Awami League-led government of Bangladesh, initiated within the framework of the 2024 Bangladesh quota reform movement. The sole demand of this movement was the resignation of Prime Minister Sheikh Hasina and her cabinet. Later Hasina was forced to resign and exile to India.

=== Yunus Interim government (2024–2026) ===
An interim government led by Muhammad Yunus was formed on 8 August 2024 in Bangladesh, following the resignation of Prime Minister Sheikh Hasina on 5 August 2024 amid nationwide student and public protests against the government. Following the dissolution of the 12th Jatiya Sangsad on 6 August 2024, the interim government will remain in office until a new Prime Minister is appointed after a snap general election. The government, like the previous Caretaker government of Bangladesh and interim government in 1975 and 1990, is extra-constitutional. However, the Appellate Division of the Supreme Court of Bangladesh affirmed the legality of the stopgap government on 9 August 2024, citing the urgent need to manage state affairs and address the constitutional vacuum, as has been the case in the past too.

==== Tarique Rahman government (2026–present) ====
The BNP returned to power after a landslide victory in the 2026 Bangladeshi general election, with the son of Ziaur Rahman and Khaleda Zia, Tarique Rahman becoming prime minister. The Awami League was legally banned in the election, and the Bangladesh Jamaat-e-Islami formed the opposition. The July Charter's provisions also received majority approval in the 2026 Bangladeshi constitutional referendum.

== See also ==
- History of Bengal
- History of East Pakistan
