= COVID-19 pandemic in South Asia =

Epidemiology of COVID-19 pandemic in Southern Asia

- South Asia
- Disease: COVID-19
- Pathogen: SARS-CoV-2
- Location: South Asia
- First outbreak: Wuhan, Hubei, China
- Index case: Kathmandu, Nepal
- Arrival date: 5 January 2020
- Confirmed cases: 8,395,617 (17 February 2021)
- Active cases: 1,176,416 (17 February 2021)
- Recovered: 7,347,826 (17 February 2021)
- Deaths: 128,625 (17 February 2021)
- Territories: Afghanistan; Bangladesh; Bhutan; India; Maldives; Nepal; Pakistan; Sri Lanka

Government website
- SAARC Disaster Management Centre

Countries and territories in South Asia have been affected by the COVID-19 pandemic. The first South Asian country to report a confirmed case was Nepal, which documented its first case on 23 January 2020, in a man who had returned from Wuhan on 9 January. As of 2 July, at least one case of COVID-19 has been reported in every country in South Asia. Afghanistan, Bangladesh, Pakistan and Maldives have implemented lockdowns, Sri Lanka has responded with quarantine curfews while India and Nepal have declared a country-wide lockdown. Countries have also instituted various levels of restrictions on international travel, some countries have completely sealed off their land borders and grounded most international flights.

India, Pakistan, and Bangladesh were three South Asian countries that overtook China in terms of the number of coronavirus cases. In the middle of May, India was the first South Asian country to overtake China in terms of the number of coronavirus cases. On 4 June, Pakistan was the second South Asian country. And on 13 June, Bangladesh was the third South Asian country. In India, the number of recoveries exceeded the number of active cases on 10 June. In Pakistan, the number of recoveries exceeded the number of active cases on 3 July. And in Bangladesh, the number of recoveries exceeded the number of active cases on 12 July.

Governments are attempting to coordinate a response to the pandemic through the regional organization, SAARC, the South Asia Association for Regional Cooperation. India Prime Minister Narendra Modi proposed a joint emergency fund to tackle the pandemic, and pledged to seed US$10 Million. As of 11 April, Sri Lanka had contributed US$5 million to the SAARC COVID-19 Emergency Fund and Pakistan $3 million, Bangladesh $1.5 million, Afghanistan and Nepal had given $1 million each, Maldives had given $200,000 while Bhutan $100,000.

== Background ==
The ongoing pandemic of coronavirus disease 2019 (COVID-19) is caused by severe acute respiratory syndrome coronavirus 2 (SARS-CoV-2). The outbreak was first identified in Wuhan, Hubei, China, in December 2019 and recognised as a pandemic by the World Health Organization (WHO) on 11 March 2020. As of 29 March 2020, more than 708,000 cases of COVID-19 have been reported in over 190 countries and territories, resulting in approximately 33,500 deaths. More than 150,000 people have since recovered.

The virus primarily spreads between people in a way similar to influenza, via respiratory droplets from coughing or sneezing. The time between exposure and symptom onset is typically five days, but may range from two to fourteen days. Symptoms are most often fever, dry cough, and shortness of breath. Complications may include pneumonia and acute respiratory distress syndrome. There is no vaccine or specific antiviral treatment, but research is ongoing. Efforts are aimed at managing symptoms and supportive therapy. Recommended preventive measures include handwashing, covering the mouth when coughing, maintaining distance from other people (particularly those who are unwell), and monitoring and self-isolation for fourteen days for people who suspect they are infected.

South Asia is one of the most densely populated regions and having low testing rates, and is considered highly vulnerable to any large scale outbreak of an infectious disease.

== Statistics ==
| Territories | Date | Confirmed cases | Active cases | Recoveries | Deaths | Total tests | Tests per million population | Ref. |
|---|---|---|---|---|---|---|---|---|
| India | 22 Jan 2022 | 39,237,264 | 2,187,192 | 36,560,650 | 489,422 | 713,499,892 | 509,234 | |
| Bangladesh | 15 Jul 2022 | 1,994,433 | 44,085 | 1,921,123 | 29,225 | 14,484,461 | 86,205 | |
| Pakistan | 15 Jul 2022 | 1,544,910 | 9,665 | 1,504,817 | 30,428 | 29,241,450 | 127,355 | |
| Nepal | 26 July 2022 | 984,475 | 3,714 | 968,802 | 11,959 | 5,804,358 | 206,592 | |
| Afghanistan | 22 Jan 2022 | 159,548 | 5,970 | 146,188 | 7,390 | 842,743 | 20,916 | |
| Maldives | 15 Jul 2022 | 183,491 | 19,497 | 163,687 | 307 | 2,213,831 | 3,954,068 | |
| Sri Lanka | 22 Jan 2022 | 601,048 | 9,832 | 575,932 | 15,284 | 6,007,118 | 278,713 | |
| Bhutan | 22 Jan 2022 | 3,557 | 900 | 2,654 | 3 | 1,388,558 | 1,769,240 | |

== By country ==
=== Afghanistan ===
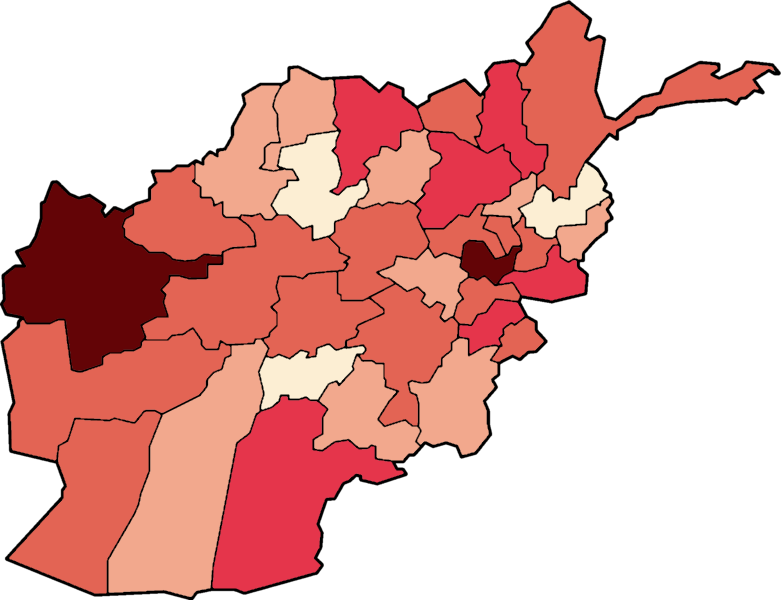
Map of the number of confirmed cases of COVID-19 in Afghanistan as of 17 April 2020. Confirmed cases 0 Confirmed cases 1–9 Confirmed cases 10–19 Confirmed cases 20-99 Confirmed cases ≥100

On 24 February, Afghanistan confirmed its first COVID-19 case, in a 35-year-old man from Herat province. On 7 March, three new cases were confirmed in Herat. On 10 March, the first case outside of Herat province, was reported in Samangan province, bringing the total to five. By 22 March, the day Afghanistan confirmed its first official death, the total number of cases had risen to 40. As of 29 March, a total of 120 cases had been confirmed, resulting in four deaths and three recoveries.

Afghanistan temporarily closed its border with Iran on 23 February when first suspected cases emerged in Herat province bordering Iran. In March, it restricted most international flights. By the end of March, strict restrictions on the movement of people and public gatherings were in place in several provinces; lockdowns had also been implemented, including in Kabul and Kandahar.

=== Bangladesh ===
The first three COVID-19 cases of the country were found on 7 March 2020 that was officially confirmed on 8 March 2020 by Professor Dr. Meerjady Sabrina Flora, former director, Institute of Epidemiology, Disease Control and Research (IEDCR). As of 29 March 2020, the Government of Bangladesh has confirmed testing 1095 samples among which there is a total of 48 confirmed cases, 15 recoveries, and 5 deaths in the country., were confirmed to have spread to Bangladesh in March 2020.

On 22 March, Bangladesh declared a 10-day shut down effective from March 26 to 4 April .

=== Bhutan ===
On 6 March, Bhutan confirmed its first COVID-19 case, a 76-year-old US male who travelled to the country via India. Around 90 people who came directly in contact with him, along with his 59-year-old partner, driver, and guide were quarantined. Bhutan immediately restricted entry of foreign tourists for two weeks. On 20 March, the 59-year old partner of the American tourist tested positive for COVID-19. Although the driver and guide tested negative, both were held in extended quarantine even though their quarantine period had ended.

On 22 March, Jigme Khesar Namgyel Wangchuck, the king of Bhutan, announced in a national address that the country's land borders would be sealed off. On 24 March, the government closed all its borders with India. On 25 March, a student who had returned from the United Kingdom was found to be positive for COVID-19, the third case in the country. On 29 March, According to the Ministry of Health, a returning student in the quarantine facility tested positive. The patient was moved to the isolation ward in Thimphu.

=== India ===
Confirmed cases of COVID-19 infections in India as of 2 May 2021

India has more than 5 million confirmed COVID-19 cases in the world which is largest in Asia and second largest in the world after United States with more than 82 thousand deaths and around 4 million patients recovered.

Country reported its first infection on 30 January 2020 while eventual moderate rise of infections took place due to students from Wuhan and tourist groups from Italy. In March, the transmissions grew after several people with travel history to affected countries, and their contacts, tested positive. On 12 March, a 76-year-old man, with a travel history to Saudi Arabia, became the first COVID-19 fatality of India. A gathering by Tablighi Jamaat emerged as a super spreader event adding more than 4,000 cases directly. On 22 March, the Government of India announced complete lockdown in 82 districts in 22 states and Union Territories of country where confirmed cases were reported. 80 cities including Delhi, Bengaluru, Chennai, Mumbai, Chandigarh and Kolkata were put under lockdown. Some states sealed their borders barring inter-state movement. On 24 March, PM Narendra Modi announced a complete 21-day national lockdown to contain the pandemic. By 6 April, the doubling rate had slowed to six days from earlier figure of three days.

Oxford COVID-19 Government Response Tracker (OxCGRT) noted the government's swift and stringent actions, emergency policy-making, emergency investment in health care, fiscal stimulus, and investment in vaccine and drug R&D and gave India a score of 100 for the strict response. Michael Ryan, chief executive director of the WHO's health emergencies programme noted that India had tremendous capacity to deal with the outbreak owing to its vast experience in eradicating smallpox and polio. In June, India was ranked 56th of 200 countries in COVID-19 safety assessment report by Deep Knowledge Group.

India initially suffered from a low testing rate, however has substantially increased it. Country also has launched a number of research projects for treatment of disease and development of anti COVID vaccines. Demand amid pandemic has also turned India into world's second largest manufacturer of PPE after China.

=== Maldives ===
The COVID-19 pandemic was confirmed to have spread to the Maldives on 7 March 2020 from an Italian tourist who had returned to Italy after spending holidays in Kuredu Resort & Spa. The Health Protection Agency of the Maldives confirmed two cases in the Maldives, both employees of the resort. Following this, the hotel was locked down with several tourists stranded on the island. As of 11 March, the islands resorts of Kuredu, Vilamendhoo, Batalaa and Kuramathi island have also been placed under temporary quarantine.

The Maldives declared a public health emergency over COVID-19 on 12 March. On 27 March, the government announced the first confirmed case of a Maldivian citizen with COVID-19, a passenger who had returned from the United Kingdom. This brought the total number of confirmed cases in the country to 16; the other 15 were foreign citizens.

=== Nepal ===
A Nepali student who had returned to Kathmandu from Wuhan became the first case of the country and South Asia on 23 January 2020. The first case of local transmission inside the country was confirmed on 4 April, while the first COVID-19 death came on 14 May. The country observed an almost four-month-long nationwide lockdown between 24 March and 21 July. As of 26 July 2022, the country has a total of 984,475 confirmed cases, 968,802 recoveries, and 11,959 deaths.

=== Sri Lanka ===
Confirmed cases per districts

When compared with other South Asian countries, Sri Lanka has the best position. It has had the COVID-19 outbreak for the longest duration but has managed to limit the case count the most. Sri Lanka also managed to keep lowest death rate in South Asia. Sri Lanka's fatality rate is 0.7%.

In May 2020, Sri Lanka was ranked the 9th best country in the world for its successful response in tackling the virus; however, Sri Lanka was also ranked the 16th most vulnerable country to COVID-19.

In May 2021, Sri Lanka started its vaccination program with the Oxford–AstraZeneca and Sinopharm BIBP vaccines and Sputnik V. Sri Lanka has also ordered 5 million doses of Pfizer–BioNTech becoming the first South Asian nation to approve and ordered the Pfizer vaccine.

As of 13 May 2021 135,796 confirmed cases have been reported in the country with 892 deaths. A ban on foreign arrivals has been instituted postponed.

=== Pakistan ===
The COVID-19 pandemic in Pakistan is part of the pandemic of coronavirus disease 2019 (COVID-19) caused by severe acute respiratory syndrome coronavirus 2 (SARS-CoV-2). The virus was confirmed to have reached Pakistan on 26 February 2020, when two cases were recorded (a student in Karachi who had just returned from Iran and another person in the Islamabad Capital Territory). On 18 March 2020, cases had been confirmed in all four provinces, the two autonomous territories, and Islamabad Capital Territory, and by 17 June, each district in Pakistan had recorded at least one confirmed case of COVID-19.

Despite being the world's 5th-most-populous country, Pakistan only has so far recorded the world's 29th-highest death toll (at approximately 23,087) and 29th-highest number of confirmed cases (at approximately 1,011,708). However, these figures do not include under-counting of COVID-19 infections in the country.

Pakistan so far has experienced three different waves of COVID-19. The nation's first wave, which began in late May 2020, peaked in mid-June when daily new confirmed case numbers and daily new death numbers reached high points – and ended in mid-July. The first wave was marked by a low death rate, and passed very suddenly as case and death rates began to drop very quickly after peaking. After the first wave, Pakistan's COVID-19 situation subsided ,dand aily new death numbers and testing positive rates in the country stabilized at low levels. Cases and deaths began rising again, though, in early November 2020, culminating in the country's second wave. This wave was low in its intensity, mainly affected the southern province of Sindh, and peaked in mid-December 2020. The country's third wave began in mid-March 2021, when testing positivity rates, and daily new confirmed cases and deaths began to skyrocket. The third wave mainly affected the provinces of Punjab and Khyber Pakhtunkhwa. This wave peaked in late April 2021, and since then, positivity rates, daily new case numbers, and daily new death numbers have been falling.

Pakistan's most populated province, Punjab, has so far seen the highest raw number of confirmed cases (334,000) and deaths (9,770). Sindh, the second-most populated province in the country, has seen the second-highest number of confirmed cases (308,000) and deaths (4,910), but was hit hardest by Pakistan's first two waves of the virus, and still has higher proportions of confirmed cases than all of Pakistan's other provinces. It also has the second-highest death rate, after Khyber Pakhtunkhwa, which is Pakistan's third-most-populated province. While Khyber Pakhtunkhwa has the third-highest number of confirmed cases of COVID-19 (129,000), it has faced an exceptionally high fatality rate of 3.03% which has caused it to have the highest death rate out of any province and the third-highest number of deaths (3,920). In the southwest of the country, the sparse and arid province of Balochistan has seen the lowest confirmed case count (24,500) and the lowest death count (270) of all of Pakistan's provinces and has also shown the lowest number of confirmed cases per capita, as well as the lowest number of deaths per capita. The fatality rate in Balochistan is especially low, currently standing at 1.10%. Islamabad Capital Territory, which is richer than any of Pakistan's provinces, has confirmed 80,300 cases and has seen 745 deaths so far, giving it a higher number of deaths per capita and a higher number of confirmed cases per capita than any Pakistani province, while also having the lowest fatality rate in the country.

The country was put under a nationwide lockdown from 1 April and extended twice until 9 May. Upon its end, the lockdown was eased in phases. After the first wave, the country has battled COVID-19 by using "smart lockdowns" and enforcing SOPs.

The distribution of COVID-19 in Pakistan is heavily concentrated in a few key areas. The city of Karachi (as of 7 May 2021) has recorded about 189,000 confirmed cases, making up about 22% of all cases of COVID-19 in Pakistan. Meanwhile, Lahore, the country's second-largest city, has recorded (as of 5 September 2020) 170,000 cases of COVID-19, making up about 19% of the country's cases. Islamabad Capital Territory and Peshawar District have recorded about 79,000 and 47,000 confirmed cases respectively as of the latest available data. Karachi, Lahore, Islamabad, and Peshawar account for about 485,000 cases, which make up over 55% of the country's total confirmed cases.

== Regional response ==
=== 15 March conference call ===
On 13 March, India Prime Minister Narendra Modi called for a joint regional response to the pandemic through the regional organisation, SAARC; the proposal was met with positive response. A conference call was attended by heads of governments of all member states, except Pakistan which sent the special adviser to the prime minister, on 15 March. Modi's proposal to set up an emergency fund was agreed upon. Modi also proposed creating a common research platform to coordinate research within the South Asia region, while Afghan President Ashraf Ghani proposed creating a common framework for telemedicine.

=== SAARC COVID-19 Emergency Fund ===
On 15 March 2020, coinciding with the International Consumer Rights Day the emergency fund was proposed by Indian Prime Minister Narendra Modi during a video conference of SAARC heads of government from New Delhi as a result of the global coronavirus pandemic. The purpose of this fund is to tackle and mitigate the risks associated with the coronavirus pandemic in the South Asian region. Other member nations welcomed the decision of Modi for the proposal of coronavirus emergency fund.

India announced US$10 million as its initial contribution to support the initiative and Modi stated that the contributions for the fund from member countries would be voluntary. As of 11 April 2020, the Emergency fund had accumulated sum of US$21.8 million with the pool of contributions from seven member countries.

Bangladesh announced it would contribute US$1.5 million, Nepal and Afghanistan each announced that they would voluntarily contribute US$1 million. On 23 March, Sri Lanka announced it would contribute US$5 million which was the second most highest contribution from a member country besides India. Maldives announced it would contribute US$200,000 while Bhutan announced it would contribute US$100,000. On 10 April, Pakistan also announced a contribution of $3 million.

=== Medical response coordination ===
The SAARC Disaster Management Centre later launched a website for information related to the pandemic in member countries, as proposed by Modi in the conference call.

A video conference was held among health professional of all countries at the director general of health services (DGHS) level on 26 March, to discuss a framework for cooperation as agreed in the 15 March conference. A shared electronic platform for sharing of information, knowledge and expertise was proposed.

== Censorship ==
People in India, Pakistan, Bangladesh, and Sri Lanka have been arrested for allegedly spreading false information about the COVID-19 pandemic.

== Impact of mobility reduction on air quality ==
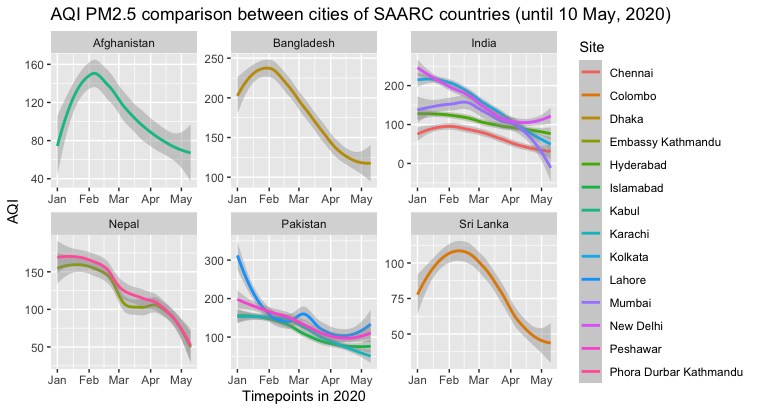
AQI PM2.5 changes across SAARC countries indicates a reduction of particle emission due to COVID-19 containment measurement as well as a positive environmental outcome in the cities. The data has been smoothed using the locally weighted scatterplot smoothing (LOWESS) method.

In light of the Google COVID-19 community mobility reports, apparently Afghanistan has a base decrease of mobility and a lower mobility in residential from the base. As far as indoor activity, rate versatility expanded in all nations at a comparable level aside from Afghanistan. Bangladesh, India, Nepal, Pakistan, and Sri Lanka had a higher decrease in outdoor, open air versatility. Notwithstanding, for Bangladesh and Pakistan, mobility in the parks didn't lessen that much (around 10-25%) contrasted with other SAARC nations aside from Afghanistan. Likewise, in all classes, Sri Lanka has a reliably higher decrease in portability.

The impact of mobility decrease was likewise seen noticeable in air-quality record (in view of particulate issue size 2.5 micrometers, otherwise called AQI PM2.5). Aside from the Bhutan and Maldives, all nations in SAARC have day by day records of PM2.5 (as announced in airnow.gov) which has been imagined in figure 4 from mid 2020 until May 10 for all urban areas for which the information is accessible in SAARC. Afghanistan, Bangladesh, and Sri Lanka indicated an expansion of AQI PM2.5 esteem in mid 2020 that crested in mid February, and afterward reliably declined until May. In every single other nation, a consistent diminishing has been seen in these five months. Since a huge extent of PM2.5 can be credited to traffic vehicle's gas and mechanical consuming of fills, this overall decrease of AQI information by implication shows an impact of lockdown in these nations.

== See also ==
- COVID-19 pandemic in Asia
- COVID-19 pandemic by country and territory
