= Bidyanondo Foundation =

Bangladeshi non-profit social organization

- বিদ্যানন্দ ফাউন্ডেশন
- Founded: 22 December 2013
- Founder: Kishor Kumar Das
- Type: Non Profit Organization
- Registration no.: S-12258/2015
- Region served: Bangladesh
- Website: www.bidyanondo.org

Bidyanondo Foundation (Bengali: বিদ্যানন্দ ফাউন্ডেশন) is a non-profit organization registered under the Bangladesh Department of Social Services. It works to help the poor community of Bangladesh and performs various social welfare activities. This organization was founded by Kishor Kumar Das in 2013.

== History ==
Kishor Kumar Das, a computer science graduate from Chittagong University of Engineering & Technology, established the organization in 2013. It focuses on the education and feeding of street children. As of 2020, it operated 12 branches that provided basic literacy, educational supplies, food, and other essentials to more than 2,000 children.

== Activities ==
Bidyanondo provides tutoring, educational supplies, and library facilities to students.

The organization is known for rendering many of their services for a token price of one Bangladeshi taka, a practice intended to avoid the stigma of accepting charity. Their 'One Taka Meal' program serves more than 2,000 lunches a day to children and the elderly. During Ramadan, they also sell sahri and iftar meals for one taka. The organization also dispenses medical services and legal assistance for a fee of one taka.

Other charitable activities include selling clothing to the poor for nominal amounts during the Durga Puja festival, and distributing blankets to the poor at no cost.

=== During COVID-19 pandemic ===
In 2020, different areas of Bangladesh were locked-down due to the COVID-19 pandemic. The foundation expanded its activities to include setting up hand washing stations, manufacturing and distributing masks and hand sanitizer, sanitizing public transport, spraying disinfectant in public spaces, and distributing food to the underprivileged.

Bidyanondo reacted more swiftly to the pandemic than the government did, which drew attention and increased donations to the charity. With the additional funding, they ventured into the hospital sector. In 2020, they partnered with the owners of BK Convention Hall in Patenga Thana and with the Chittagong Metropolitan Police to transform the building into a field hospital. It opened in July with 50 beds. Bidyanondo also worked with the Bangladesh Coast Guard to repurpose a hired tourist boat into a floating hospital named Jibon Kheya, which began treating patients in September. The following April, Bidyanondo opened a 70-bed field hospital in Halishahar Thana of Chittagong.

=== Others ===
Recently they have come up with discussion by making exercise notebooks and school bags out of waste electoral posters and banners. Bidyanondo also operates a 36-bed women's hostel in Dhaka.

== Finances ==
Bidyanondo is a small nonprofit, with only 40 full-time staff as of 2019. According to Das, its 2017 budget was about 20,000,000 Bangladeshi taka ($250,000 as of 2017). As of 2020, financial support comes from 5,000 donors. Most are from Bangladesh, but a large percentage of donations come from abroad.
