= BD Clean =

Voluntary organization in Bangladesh

- Formation: 3 June 2016 (9 years ago)
- Founder: Farid Uddin
- Founded at: Bangladesh
- Type: Voluntary Organisation
- Purpose: The main purpose of BD Clean is to establish the status of Bangladesh as one of the cleanest nations in the world and to set every citizen of Bangladesh as an example of an ideal citizen worldwide.
- Chief Coordinator: Masudur Rahaman
- Deputy Chief Coordinator: Tokaruzzaman
- Head of IT & Media: Adnan Sami
- Head of Logistics: Abdul Aziz Rocky
- Volunteers: 58,000+ active members
- Website: bdclean.org

BD Clean is a volunteer-based youth organization working to establish Bangladesh as a clean country. Every Friday, the organization selects a specific place in the country to clean. It also works to educate the local people about the benefits of a clean environment, and encourages them to properly dispose of garbage instead of littering.

== History ==
BD Clean was founded on 3 June 2016 by Farid Uddin and several friends. Dhaka Clean was launched on 2 June 2016 as a roadside scavenger hunt from Shahbag to A SAARC Fountain in Kawran Bazar, which is now known as BD Clean. As of 2023, BD Clean has more than 44,000 active members. They have branch teams in 12 city corporations, 3 public universities, 58 districts and upazilas under the district.

== Activities ==
BD Clean's 58 district and sub-district upazila teams individually select a local unclean spot on a specific day every week to clean. They educate the surrounding people about the benefits of cleanliness, and about the role of the people in realizing a clean Bangladesh. They request that the locals do not litter. Various awareness exhibitions and road shows are also organized by BD Clean. BD Clean has organized three exhibitions so far. On Friday, January 19, 2024, Habiganj - 4 Constituency Member of Parliament Syed Sayedul Haque, who is better known as Barrister Suman. At his invitation, with own funding, BD Clean was gone from Dhaka with more than six hundred volunteers to clean the dying Khoai River. Which again brings BD clean to the national discussion. Besides, BD Clean has also been hugely discussed among the capital residents as a result of the cleaning of several rivers and canals in the areas included in the Dhaka North City Corporation. On May 11, 2024, they divided into 21 groups and carried out cleaning operations on a 5 km section of the canal from Rangpur's Shyamasundari canal check post to Shapla.

== Exhibitions ==
BD Clean organized a total of 3 exhibitions. The slogan of the exhibitions is, "I am not saying no to use plastic materials, I am just saying to be aware, let's all build a clean Bangladesh, take great care". The exhibitions named Save Earth Save Bangladesh were held successively as Season-1, Season-2 and Season-3. These exhibitions were widely appreciated by the public and were made from non-biodegradable materials such as cigarette filters, plastic bottles, packets of chips, polythene etc.

=== Save Earth Save Bangladesh Season - 1 ===
The exhibition, titled Save Earth Save Bangladesh Season 1, features portrait installations made from 30 lakh discarded plastic bottles, inaugurated by Atiqul Islam, Mayor of Dhaka North City Corporation. The exhibition held at BTCL(T&T) ground next to Titumir College on Wireless Road in Banani area of the capital was displayed to the public from 17 December 2019 to 25 December 2019. Various portrait installations made of plastic bottles, bottle caps were displayed in the exhibition. For example: portrait of Bangabandhu with bottle cap, map of Bangladesh, national memorial, tiger mask and various items of daily use.

=== Save Earth Save Bangladesh Season - 2 ===
Season - 2 of the exhibition was held at the same venue from 17 December 2021 to 25 December 2021. Mayor of Dhaka North City Corporation Atiqul Islam inaugurated the exhibition by reciting the oath of BD Clean. Goodwill Ambassador of BD Clean Solaiman Sukhan, Group Director of TK Group of Industries Md. Mostafizur Rahman, representatives of Rotary Club Dhaka, Mayors Association of Bangladesh, Faraj Karim Chowdhury, Chairman of ATN Bangla and ATN News Dr. Mahfuzur Rahman came as guests in this 9-day long exhibition. And many more. In this exhibition, BD Clean volunteers created various sculptures with 5 crore cigarette filters and 1 lakh cigarette packets collected from all over the country. Among them, a 71 ft by 100 ft map of Bangladesh drawn with cigarette filters, a portrait of Sheikh Mujibur Rahman made from abandoned bottle caps. In addition, the organization's volunteers make fish, brains, turtles, trees, fruits, lungs and tree sap from cigarette filters collected from around the country. The stage, gates, walls of the exhibition are all made of cigarette filters and packets.

=== Save Earth Save Bangladesh Season - 3 ===
The third episode (Season-3) of the exhibition with the same title was held from 30 December 2022 to 7 January 2023. As before, the exhibition held at the BTCL (T&T) grounds in Banani was also decorated with various structures made of discarded and non-perishable materials. A boundary made of discarded plastic bottles, a fish figure made of plastic bottles, a sculpture of a dead banyan tree made of cigarette filters, a sculpture of an endangered turtle made by picking up packets of chips thrown away by common people. Also, a huge cigarette shape with cigarette filters, a human brain and a giant grenade. Each installation is based on a cigarette filter. A portrait of Bangabandhu is made from discarded plastic bottle caps, with the quote "Bangabandhu's hand-made dear Bangladesh, we will keep it clean; in the month of great victory, this is our firm pledge". 3 crore discarded cigarette filters, more than 45 lakh plastic bottles, more than 6 tonnes of polythene and chips packets were used in the construction of these structures. The exhibition was inaugurated by Atiqul Islam, Mayor of Dhaka North City Corporation. Tajul Islam, Minister of Local Government, Rural Development and Cooperatives, spoke as the chief guest at the closing ceremony.

== Clean campus declaration ==
From 10 November 2017 to 26 January 2018, the volunteers of BD Clean carried out a continuous campaign to increase awareness about cleanliness with a 12-week clean campaign with the aim of establishing a clean University of Dhaka campus. On January 26, 2018, at 3 pm, after the group photo and oath, about 15 hundred BD Clean volunteers started the campus cleaning work simultaneously in 121 sections. After the cleaning at 6.25 pm Dhaka University Vice-Chancellor Mohammed Akhtaruzzaman declared the University of Dhaka campus as clean.

== Official Oath ==
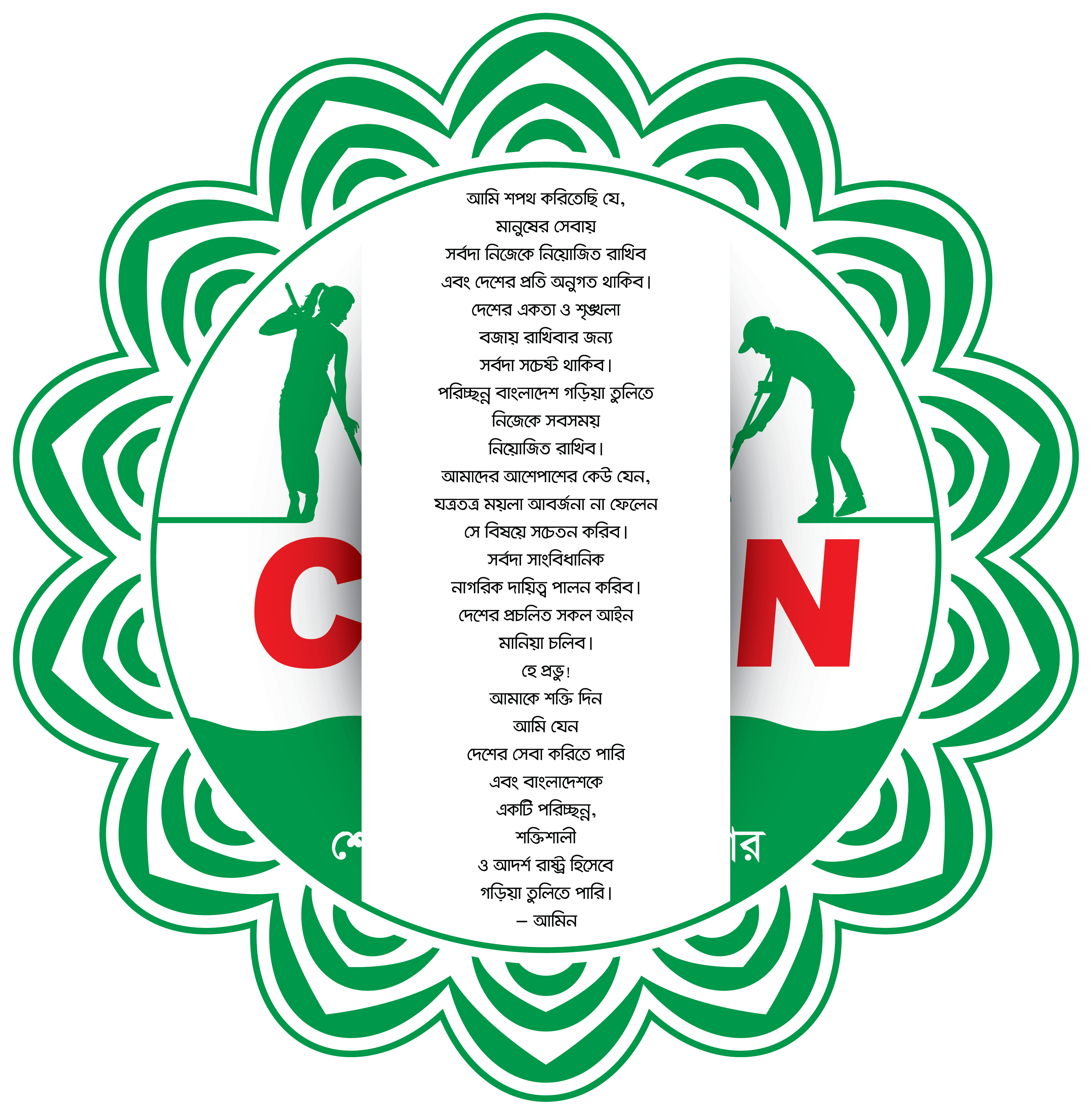
BD Clean's official oath

BD Clean recites an oath at their weekly cleanup events across the country, which is established as the organisation's institutional oath. Oath:

I swear that

I will always devote myself to the service of the people

and remain loyal to the country.

I will always strive to maintain the unity and order of the country.

I will always devote myself to building a clean Bangladesh.

I will make everyone around me

aware that they should not litter.

I will always fulfill my constitutional

civic duties.

I will abide by all the laws of the country.

Oh Lord!

Give me strength

so that

I can serve the country

and build Bangladesh

as a clean,

strong

and ideal state.

-Amin

(Note: This oath has been translated from Bengali. The official oath is in Bengali)

== Controversy ==
The founder of BD Clean, Farid Uddin, has been accused of various allegations. According to reports from multiple media sources, he allegedly misappropriated crores of taka from Dhaka North City Corporation by exploiting volunteers. Additionally, he faces corruption charges.
