= Institute of Epidemiology, Disease Control and Research =

Government organization in Dhaka, Bangladesh

Institute of Epidemiology Disease Control And Research
- Abbreviation: IEDCR
- Formation: 1976
- Purpose: Epidemiology, disease control and research
- Headquarters: Dhaka
- Location: Bangladesh
- Region served: Bangladesh
- Official language: Bengali
- Director: Tahmina Shirin
- Parent organization: Ministry of Health
- Website: www.iedcr.gov.bd

The Institute of Epidemiology, Disease Control And Research (IEDCR) (Bengali: রোগতত্ত্ব, রোগ নিয়ন্ত্রণ ও গবেষণা ইনস্টিটিউট) is a Bangladesh government research institute, under the Ministry of Health, responsible for researching epidemiological and communicable disease in Bangladesh as well as disease control. Tahmina Shirin is the head of the organization.

== History ==
Institute of Epidemiology Disease Control And Research was established by the government of Bangladesh in 1976. It is responsible for epidemiological and communicable disease research as well as developing public health plans for the government of Bangladesh to implement. It incorporated the previously established Malaria Institute of East Pakistan, which was part of the Central Malaria Institute of India before the partition of India.

The institute was the first COVID-19 testing site in Bangladesh following the COVID-19 pandemic in Bangladesh. It had been given the task to carryout epidemiological surveillance during the pandemic.
