= Mastul Foundation =

Bangladeshi non-profit organisation

- মাস্তুল ফাউন্ডেশন
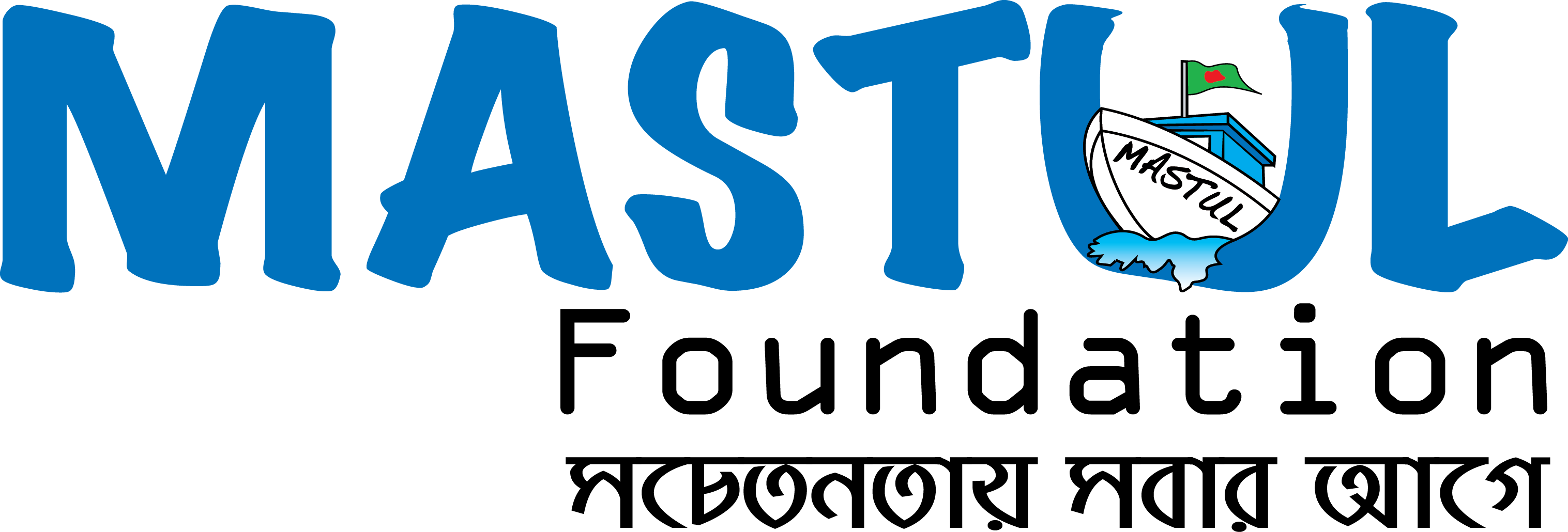
- Founder: Kazi Reaz Rahman
- Type: Nonprofit
- Headquarters: Dhaka, Bangladesh
- Location: Bangladesh
- Volunteers: 8,700
- Website: https://www.mastul.net/

Mastul Foundation is a government-registered non-profit organization based in Bangladesh, founded in 2013 by Kazi Reaz Rahman. The organization focuses on education, healthcare, youth development, and humanitarian aid for underprivileged communities across the country.

== History ==
Mastul Foundation informally began when Kazi Reaz Rahman, then a university student, met a group of street children at Rabindra Sarobar who asked for books and pencils. He set up a small informal school there to support their learning needs, which eventually led to the formation of the foundation.

== Activities ==
Mastul Foundation has approximately 8,700 volunteers and operates across 5 divisions and 14 districts. It also manages a daily community kitchen (MASTUL Mehmankhana), providing meals to hundreds of low-income individuals. Mastul Foundation also carries out diverse activities addressing multiple social issues:

=== Child Sponsorship ===
The "Sponsor A Child" program connects disadvantaged children with donor parents who financially support the children's education.

=== Shelter Home and Child Welfare ===
Mastul Foundation operates the Mastul Orphanage and Shelter Home, which houses more than a hundred orphaned children and elderly residents.

=== Educational and Skill Development ===
Mastul Foundation supports more than 1,400 disadvantaged students across 25 project-based schools in 12 districts. It provides food, educational kits, health care, and nutrition. It operates its own schools and madrassas and maintains sewing and computer training centers intended to support vocational skills among underprivileged populations. It has provided support to more than 1,000 people through its Zakat self-reliance initiative.

=== Disaster Relief and Refugee Assistance ===
Mastul Foundation's project for conflicts, natural disasters, and refugees provides trauma care, shelter, medical camps, and sanitation support. It also assisted the Rohingya refugees in Bangladesh with housing, food, and clean water.

=== COVID-19 Response ===
The foundation conducted over 3,000 burials during the COVID-19 pandemic and offered free ambulance and oxygen services. It provided funeral services for approximately 510 COVID-related deaths and supported over 50 injured and disabled individuals with wheelchairs, prosthetics, and medical care through the 'MASTUL Aid' project.

== Recognition ==
Mastul Foundation received the Joy Bangla Youth Award in 2020 for its contribution to social service and youth-led initiatives.
