= Senate =

Upper house of a bicameral legislature

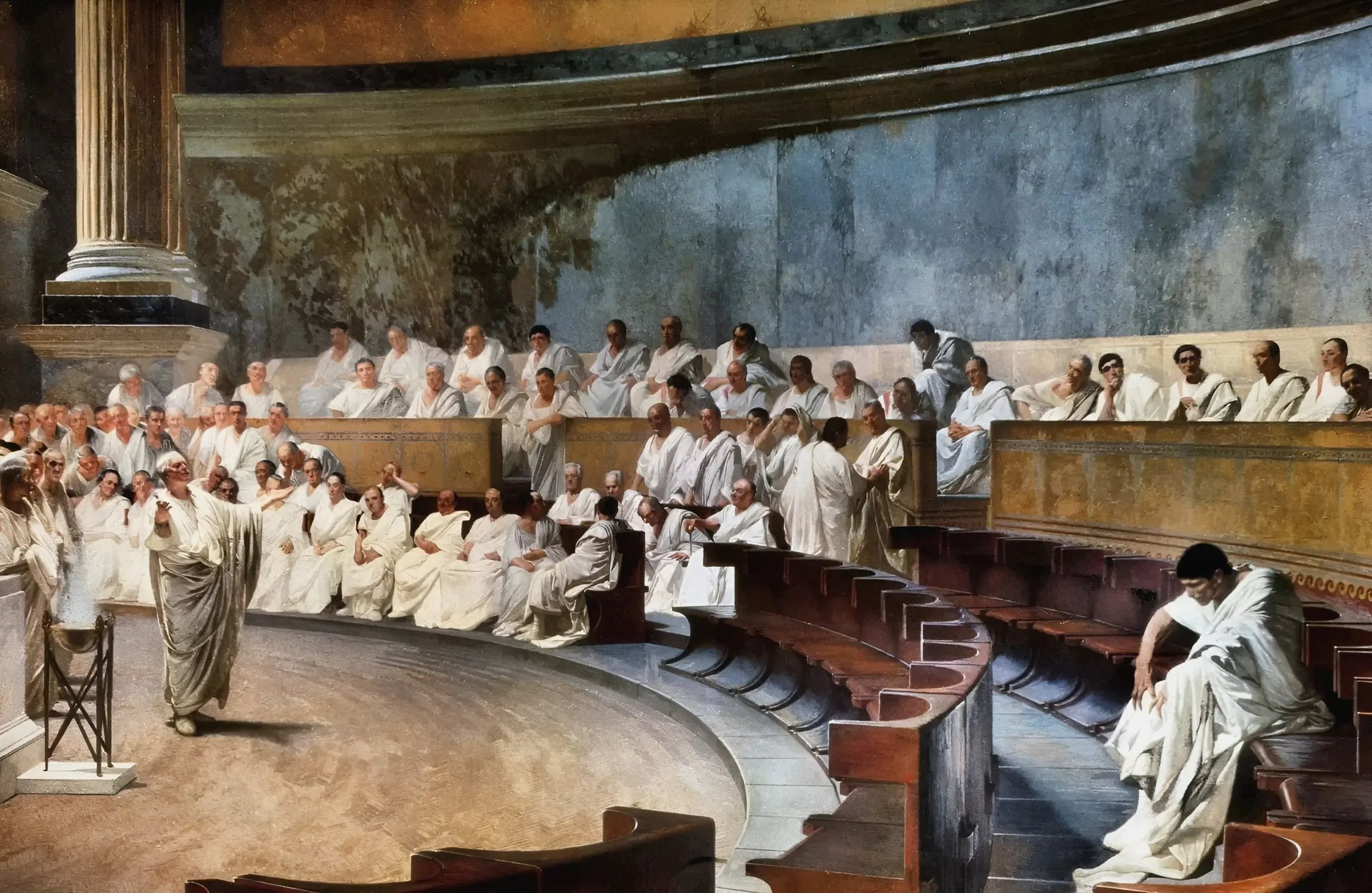
Cicero addressing the Catilinarian conspiracy in the Roman Senate

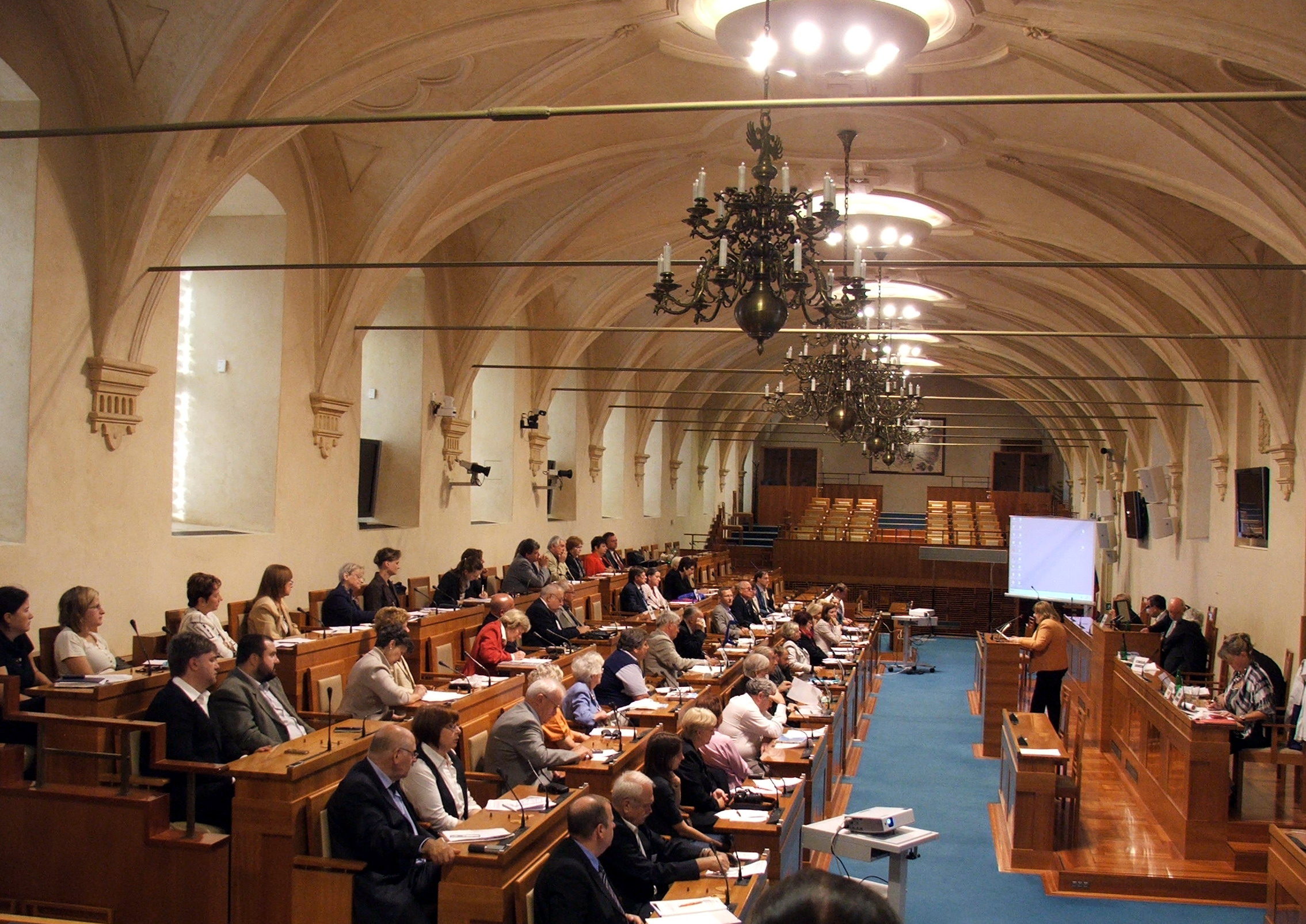
The debating chamber of the Senate of the Czech Republic in the Wallenstein Palace

A senate is a deliberative assembly, often the upper house or chamber of a bicameral legislature. The name comes from the ancient Roman Senate (Latin: Senatus), so-called as an assembly of the senior (Latin: senex meaning "the elder" or "old man") and therefore considered wiser and more experienced members of the society or ruling class. However the Roman Senate was not the ancestor or predecessor of modern parliamentarism in any sense, because the Roman senate was not a de jure legislative body.

Many countries have an assembly named a senate, composed of senators who may be elected, appointed, have inherited the title, or gained membership by other methods, depending on the country. Modern senates typically serve to provide a chamber of "sober second thought" to consider legislation passed by a lower house, whose members are usually elected. Most senates have asymmetrical duties and powers compared with their respective lower house meaning they have special duties, for example to fill important political positions or to pass special laws. Conversely many senates have limited powers in changing or stopping bills under consideration and efforts to stall or veto a bill may be bypassed by the lower house or another branch of government.

== Overview ==
The modern word senate is derived from the Latin word senātus (senate), which comes from senex, 'elder man'. A member or legislator of a senate is called senator. The Latin word senator was adopted into English with no change in spelling. Its meaning is derived from a very ancient form of social organization, in which advisory or decision-making powers are reserved for the eldest men. For the same reason, the word senate is correctly used when referring to any powerful authority characteristically composed by the eldest members of a community, as a deliberative body of a faculty in an institution of higher learning is often called a senate. This form of adaptation was used to show the power of those in body and for the decision-making process to be thorough, which could take a long period of time. The original senate was the Roman Senate, which lasted until at least CE 603, although various efforts to revive it were made in Medieval Rome. In the Eastern Roman Empire, the Byzantine Senate continued until the Fourth Crusade, circa 1202–1204. The female form senatrix also existed.

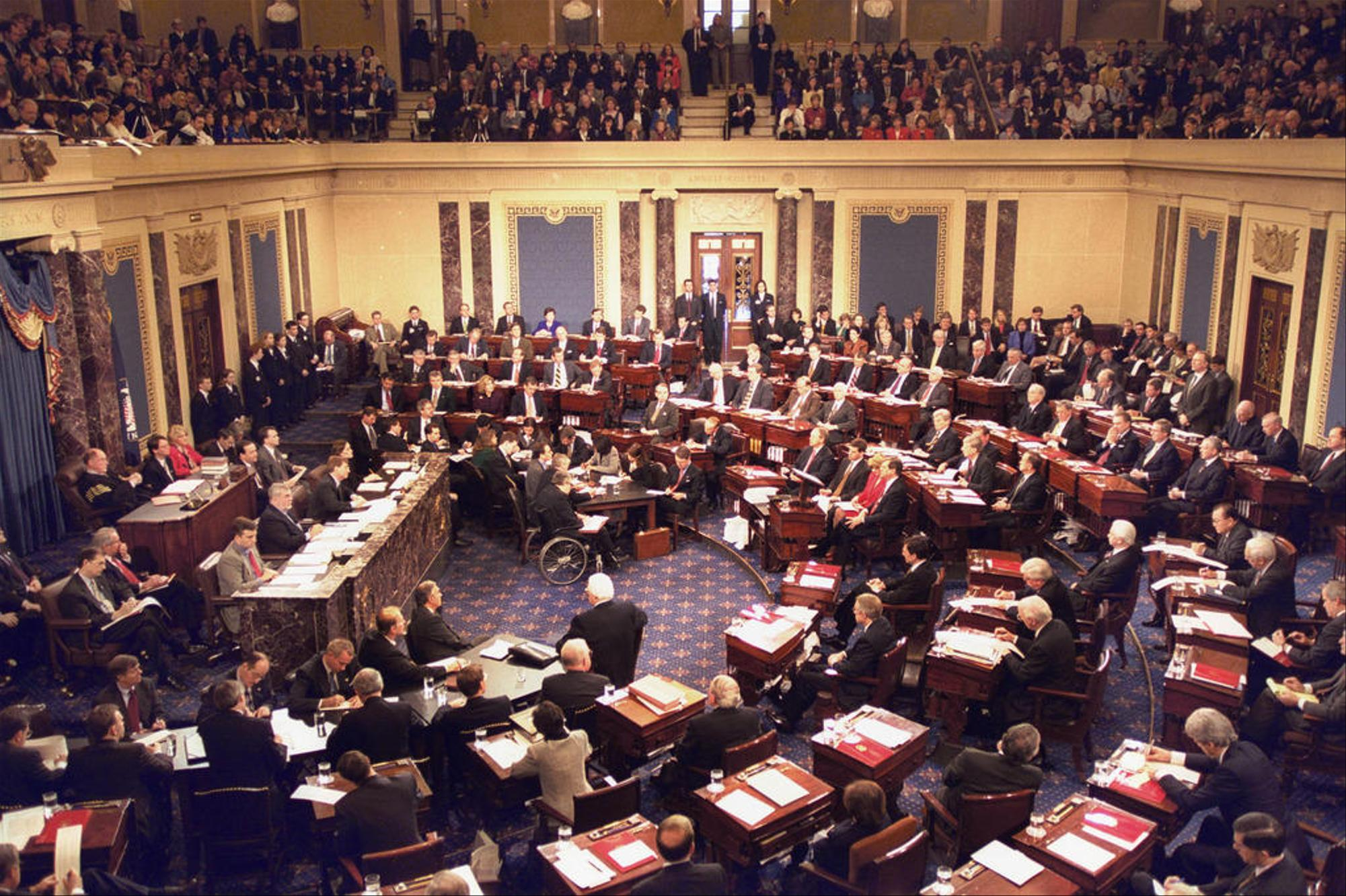
The Senate of the United States in session

Modern democratic states with bicameral parliamentary systems are sometimes equipped with a senate, often distinguished from an ordinary parallel lower house, known variously as the "House of Representatives", "House of Commons", "Chamber of Deputies", "National Assembly", "Legislative Assembly", or "House of Assembly", by electoral rules. This may include minimum age required for voters and candidates, one house employing a proportional voting system and the other being elected on a majoritarian or plurality basis, and an electoral basis or collegium. Typically, the senate is referred to as the upper house and has a smaller membership than the lower house. In some federal states senates also exist at the subnational level. In the United States, most states and territories have senates, with the exception of Nebraska, Guam, and the U.S. Virgin Islands (whose legislatures are unicameral bodies called the "Legislature" but whose members refer to themselves as "senators") and the District of Columbia (whose unicameral legislature is called the Council). There is also the US Senate at the federal level. Similarly in Argentina, in addition to the Senate at federal level, eight of the country's provinces, Buenos Aires, Catamarca, Corrientes, Entre Ríos, Mendoza, Salta, San Luis (since 1987) and Santa Fe, have bicameral legislatures with a Senate. Córdoba and Tucumán changed to unicameral systems in 2001 and 2003 respectively.

In Australia and Canada, only the upper house of the federal parliament is known as the Senate. All Australian states other than Queensland have an upper house known as a Legislative council. Several Canadian provinces also once had a Legislative Council, but these have all been abolished, the last being Quebec's Legislative council in 1968.

In Germany, the last senate of a state parliament, the Bavarian Senate, was abolished in 2000.

Senate membership can be determined either through elections or appointments. For example, elections are held every three years for half the membership of the Senate of the Philippines, the term of a senator being six years. In contrast, members of the Canadian Senate are appointed by the Governor General upon the recommendation of the Prime Minister of Canada, holding the office until they resign, are removed, or retire at the mandatory age of 75.

== Alternative meanings ==
The terms senate and senator, however, do not necessarily refer to a second chamber of a legislature:

- The Senate of Finland was, until 1918, the executive branch and the supreme court.
- The Senate of Latvia (lv) fulfilled a similar judicial function during the interbellum (1918–1940).
- In German politics:
  - In the Bundesländer (Federated States) of Germany which form a City State (in German: Stadtstaat), i.e. Berlin (Senate of Berlin), Bremen (Senate of Bremen) and Hamburg (Senate of Hamburg), the senates (Senat in German) are the executive branch, with senators (Senator) being the holders of ministerial portfolios. (Note: See Senate of Berlin, Senate of Bremen and Senate of Hamburg.)
  - In a number of cities which were former members of the Hanse (a medieval confederacy of port cities mainly at the shores of the Baltic Sea and the North Sea), such as Greifswald, Lübeck, Rostock, Stralsund, or Wismar, the city government is also called a Senate. However, in Bavaria, the Senate was a second legislative chamber until its abolition in 1999.
- In German jurisprudence:
  - The term Senat (senate) in higher courts of appeal refers to the "bench" in its broader metonymy meaning, describing members of the judiciary collectively (usually five judges), often occupied with a particular subject-matter jurisdiction. However, the judges are not called "senators". The German term Strafsenat (literally "Penal Senate") in a German court translates to Bench of penal-law jurisdiction and Zivilsenat (literally "Civil Senate") to Bench of private-law jurisdiction. The Federal Constitutional Court of Germany consists of two senates of eight judges each. In its case the division is mostly of an organizational nature, as a matter of dividing the work load; both senates handle the same kind of constitutional cases. At some points in the past, one senate was considered more conservative and the other more liberal, but that is not the case as of 2011.
- In Scotland, judges of the High Court of Justiciary are called Senators of the College of Justice.
- In some, mostly federal countries with a unicameral legislature, some of the legislators are elected differently from the others and are called senators. In federal countries, such senators represent the territories, while the other members represent the people at large (this device is used to allow a federal representation without having to establish a bicameral legislature); this is the case with St. Kitts and Nevis, Comoros and Micronesia. In other, non-federal countries, the use of the term senator marks some other difference between such members and the rest of the legislators (such as the method of selection); this is the case with Dominica's House of Assembly and the Saint Vincent House of Assembly. Until 2022, this was also the case in the States of Jersey.
- In Wales, there is a translation of the word Senatus into the Welsh language (equivalent to 'Senate' in English) as the word "Senedd". The word was used first to refer specifically to what is now referred to as the Senedd building, but the name later became a metonym for the devolved unicameral legislature it hosts, the "National Assembly for Wales", which in May 2020 adopted the name "Senedd Cymru" or "the Welsh Parliament" with the term "Senedd" becoming the common short name for the institution in both languages of Welsh and English. There is no direct translation of the word "Parliament" in Welsh, with Senedd (being a cognate of Senate) meaning both "Senate" and "Parliament".
- An academic senate is a governing body of some universities.
- In Greece during the early stages of the Greek War of Independence, various local legislative and executive bodies were established by the Greek rebels. Two of them were styled "senate": the Peloponnesian Senate and the Senate of Western Continental Greece.

== List of national senates ==
- Antigua and Barbuda
- Argentina
- Austria
- Australia
- Bahamas
- Bangladesh
- Barbados
- Belgium
- Belize
- Bolivia
- Brazil
- Burundi
- Cambodia
- Cameroon
- Canada
- Chad
- Chile
- Colombia
- Democratic Republic of the Congo
- Republic of Congo
- Czech Republic
- Dominican Republic
- Egypt
- Eswatini
- France
- Gabon
- Germany
- Grenada
- Guinea
- Haiti
- India
- Indonesia
- Ireland
- Italy
- Ivory Coast
- Jamaica
- Japan
- Jordan
- Kenya
- Kazakhstan
- Lesotho
- Liberia
- Madagascar
- Malaysia
- Mexico
- Nepal
- Netherlands
- Nigeria
- Palau
- Pakistan
- Paraguay
- Peru
- Philippines
- Poland
- Romania
- Russia
- Rwanda
- Saint Lucia
- Somalia
- Spain
- Switzerland
- Thailand
- Togo
- Trinidad and Tobago
- United States
- Uzbekistan
- Uruguay
- Wales
- Zimbabwe

== Defunct and unestablished senates ==
Abolished in favor of
unicameral system
- 1863 Greece (Note: A Greek Senate was reestablished in 1927, and abolished again in 1935.)
- 1904 Santiago del Estero Province, Argentina
- 1954 Maldives
- 1958 Sudan
- 1966 Kenya (restored in 2013) (Note: The Kenyan Senate and House of Representatives were combined into a single National Assembly, under the 2010 Constitution, the Senate is the upper house, with the National Assembly becoming the lower house.)
- 1971 Ceylon (now Sri Lanka)
- 1979 Iran
- 1990 Tucumán Province, Argentina
- 1981 South Africa (Note: A South African Senate was reconvened between 1994 and 1997, before being replaced by the National Council of Provinces.)
- 1993 Republic of China (Taiwan) (Note: The Control Yuan existed as a parliamentary body in the 1947 Chinese constitution which were elected by provincial legislators for a duration of 6 years. After the Chinese Civil War, the government was transferred to Taiwan. In the constitutional reforms of the 1990s, the Control Yuan is now a purely auditory body, and its 29 members are nominated by the president, and confirmed by the Legislative Yuan for a duration of 6 years. Since 2005, the Legislative Yuan is now the nation's sole parliamentary body.)
- 2000 Bavaria, Germany
- 2001 Córdoba Province, Argentina
- 2017 Mauritania
Legislature disbanded
- 603 Roman Republic/Empire
- 1204 Byzantine Empire
- 1865 Confederate States of America
- 1831–1879 Montenegro
- 1931–1941 Yugoslavia
- 1939 Czechoslovakia
- 1947 British Burma
- 1958 Cuba
- 1959 Iraq
- 1961 South Korea
- 1969 Libya
- 1972 Northern Ireland
- 1972 Philippines (restored in 1987) (Note: The Philippine Senate was abolished and restored twice. A new constitution in 1935 abolished the Senate but an amendment in 1941 restored it in 1945. In 1972, Congress was prevented from convening, and a passage of a new constitution in 1973 confirmed the abolition of the Senate; an approval of a new constitution in 1987 restored it.)
- 1974 Ethiopia
- 1975 South Vietnam
- 1979 Rhodesia
New constitution adopted
- 1847 Costa Rica (Note: The 1844 Constitution of the Republic of Costa Rica Archived 2011-01-24 at the Wayback Machine provided for a Senate; the Constitution of 1847 Archived 2014-11-29 at the Wayback Machine, which replaced it, established a unicameral legislature. The Senate was reestablished by the Constitution of 1859 Archived 2014-11-29 at the Wayback Machine; the country reverted to unicameralism with the adoption of the 1871 Constitution Archived 2014-11-29 at the Wayback Machine. Costa Rica briefly restored the Senate and bicameralism with the adoption of the 1917 Constitution Archived 2014-11-29 at the Wayback Machine, but that constitution was abrogated in 1919, whereupon the 1871 Constitution was restored; it remained in effect until 1949, when Costa Rica adopted its present Constitution, which provides for a unicameral legislature.)
- 1866 Sweden
- 1871 Costa Rica
- 1886 El Salvador (Note: The 1841 Constitution of the Republic of El Salvador established a bicameral legislature with a Chamber of Deputies and a Senate. The 1886 constitution replaced the bicameral legislature with a unicameral one.)
- 1890 Japan
- 1901–1903 Serbia
- 1917 Russia
- 1919 Costa Rica
- 1919 Finland
- 1926 Portugal
- 1928 Albania
- 1930 Bahia, Brazil
- 1930 Ceará, Brazil
- 1930 Pernambuco, Brazil
- 1930 São Paulo, Brazil
- 1935 Philippines (restored in 1945)
- 1937 Ireland
- 1949 Malta
- 1950 Indonesia (restored in 2001 as Regional Representative Council)
- 1964 British Guiana (now Guyana)
- 1970 Ceylon
- 1978 Ecuador
- 1978 Philippines (restored in 1987)
- 1979 Iran
- 1979 Nicaragua
- 1982 Turkey (Note: The Turkish Senate did not function after the 1980 Turkish coup d'état and was legally abolished with the adoption of the 1982 Constitution of Turkey.)
- 1993 Peru (restored in 2026)
- 1999 Venezuela
- 2012 Senegal
- 2013 Fiji
Senate unestablished, though foreseen by the Constitution
- 1989 Lebanon
- 1994 Malawi
- 1995 Georgia
- 2004 Iraq
- 2012 Burkina Faso
- 2015 Central African Republic
- 2023 Mali

== Proposed ==
- Bangladesh - 2026 Bangladeshi constitutional referendum voted for yes. Lower house has to pass the law within 180 days.

== See also ==
- Senator for life
