= Liberal democratic constitutions with references to socialism =

Socialism has been mentioned in several liberal democratic constitutions. It is referenced either in the form of denunciation (as is the case in the Croatian, Hungarian and Polish constitutions) or in form of construction, namely that the constitution of the state in question proclaim that it seeks to establish a socialist society (Bangladesh, India, Guyana and Portugal being examples). In these cases, the intended meaning of the term socialism can vary widely and sometimes the constitutional references to socialism are left over from a previous period in the country's history.

With the exceptions of Bangladesh, India, Guyana, Portugal, and Sri Lanka, references to socialism were introduced by Marxist–Leninist communist parties (sometimes in collaboration with more moderate socialist parties). In India, it is used in relation to secularism. In Sri Lanka, socialist terms were introduced by the United National Party. Tanzania considers itself to be a socialist state, having previously been a one-party state led by the Party of the Revolution (which has been in power since independence). Croatia, Hungary and Poland have references to socialism in the form of rejection of their own past communist state.

Countries governed by a single Marxist–Leninist party that have made an attempt to abolish capitalism and/or aim to implement socialism are socialist countries that are referred to as communist states. Some of these socialist states use the title of people's republic. A number of republics with liberal democratic political systems such as Algeria and Bangladesh also adopted the title.

== In reference to construction ==
=== Bangladesh ===
On 4 November 1972, the resolution of the Constituent Assembly of Bangladesh, dominated by the Bangladesh Awami League (BAL), stated: "We promise that the ideology which inspired our freedom fighters and heroic martyrs to sacrifice their lives, viz., nationalism, socialism, democracy and secularism, these ideals shall be the main features of our Constitution". In another nod to socialism, it went on to state: "We further promise that the main objectives of our nation shall be to establish by democratic methods a socialist society free from exploitation of any kind which will ensure for every citizen the rule of law, basic human rights and political, economic and social equality, liberty and justice". Several socialist principles exist throughout the document. Article 19 provides for equality of opportunities as well as the eradication of inequalities. Article 20 provides that for every able bodied citizen work is a right, a duty and an honour while Article 20 states "from everyone according to his capacity and to everyone according to his work". Having been removed in later amendments, the original constitution stated: "A socialist economic system shall be established with a view to ensuring the attainment of a just and egalitarian society, free from exploitation of man by man. [...] The people shall own or control the instruments and means of production and distribution, and with this end in view ownership shall assume the following forms (a) state ownership, (b) cooperative ownership, and (c) private ownership".

The AL's original aim was to establish socialism. On 25 January 1975, the AL led by Bangladeshi president Sheikh Mujibur Rahman instituted a one-party system led by the Bangladesh Worker-Peasant's People's League. Rahman referred to it as the start of the Second Revolution to bring about "the democracy of the exploiting masses". Having instituted a one-party socialist state, the government went on to nationalize the media and create a people's militia. The president was killed in a coup d'état on 15 August 1975. Military strongman Ziaur Rahman amended the constitution and dropped the terms socialism and socialist from the document. During the years of military rule of Rahman (1975–1981) and Hussain Muhammad Ershad (1982–1990), state enterprises were dismantled, state subsidies withdrawn and trade liberalization and exports promoted. Contemporary Bangladesh has among the most liberalized economies of South Asia. The term socialism and socialist were reintroduced in 2011 to make the constitution more in line with the original document. However, the meaning of socialism has changed, with AL's new leader Sheikh Hasina noting that socialism was a failed system in 1991.

After the July Revolution, the July Charter was passed. It replaced the four fundamental principles Nationalism, Socialism, Democracy, and Secularism with Equality, Human Dignity, Social Justice, and Religious Harmony. On 12 February 2026, a referendum was held over these amendments.

=== Guyana ===
Although Guyana was a British colony until 1966, the People's Progressive Party (PPP) was established in 1950 as the country's first political party. The PPP was committed to Marxism–Leninism and was led by Cheddi Jagan. In 1957, the PPP split, officially over ideological differences. In reality, the split was along ethnic lines. The Indian community stayed in the PPP led by Jagan while the Afro-Guyanese left to establish the People's National Congress (PNC) led by Forbes Burnham. The PPP was in government until the British removed them from power in 1963 and instituted electoral changes which made it easier for Burnham's PNC to win a democratic election. The PNC won the 1968 general election, widely believed to have been rigged by the American government's Central Intelligence Agency to ensure the defeat of the PPP.

In 1970, the government proclaimed the Co-operative Republic of Guyana based on Burnham's idea of co-operative socialism. It was billed as a peaceful revolution and its first initiative was the nationalisation of foreign-owned enterprises. Burnham described the revolution's professed goal by using the Marxist–Leninist term commanding heights of the economy, meaning the nationalisation of the largest enterprises. Scholar Ivelaw L. Griffith has noted: "By 1976, US, Canadian, and European control over the sugar and bauxite industries, banking, drug manufacturing, imports, local trade, communications, as well as other areas, had all been transferred to the state". The changes were not revolutionary and the foreign-owners were compensated. The second initiative was the creation and the development of the cooperative sector of the economy. It was planned that this sector would dominate the economy, with state and private ownership playing a lesser role. In a further nod to the Marxist–Leninist conception of the socialist state, the PNC adopted the Doctrine of Paramountcy in 1973 which stated that all governing institutions were subordinate to the party. In the words of Burnham, "[i]i is the Party that formulates policy on the basis of its ideology, strategy and tactics. It is the Party that mobilizes, educates and appeals to the people. [...] It is the Party that then selects the members of the political government to execute the former's policy". The PNC's control of the state was strengthened by the establishment of the Office of the General Secretary of the People's National Congress and the Ministry of National Development in 1974. The Secretariat of the PNC, headed by the Office of the General Secretary, was fused into the Ministry of National Development. It was through this ministry that the PNC governed the country. The takeover of the state was followed by "socialist transformation, the harassing of the opposition and the eliminations of threats (most notably the murder of Walter Rodney), and subverting the electoral process to ensure PNC victories".

By the mid- to late 1970s, the PNC was making it clear that the country needed a new constitution. The old constitution was deemed to be "capitalist-oriented" which had entrenched "economic and associated social and political relationships which make up the framework of a capitalist society as an instrument of exploitation". The PNC had concluded that "the degree of people involvement which is possible [...] is limited. [...] They may criticise governmental action, but they do so as spectators. [...] The great forces which control the economy upon which their welfare is dependent are largely beyond their reach. [...] In effect, there is much formal democracy, but little practical democracy". In the preamble, it is stated: "WE THE PEOPLE OF THE CO-OPERATIVE REPUBLIC OF GUYANA, CONVINCED that the organisation of the State and society on socialist principles is the only means of ensuring social and economic justice for all of the people of Guyana; and, therefore, BEING MOTIVATED and guided by the principles of socialism, BEING OPPOSED to all social, economic and political systems which permit the exploitation of man by man; DO ADOPT the following-CONSTITUTION OF THE CO-OPERATIVE REPUBLIC OF GUYANA". Article 1 states that "Guyana is an indivisible, democratic sovereign state in the course of transition from capitalism to socialism" and that the principal objective of the state is "to extend socialist democracy by providing increasing opportunities for the participation of citizens in the management and decision-making processes of the State". Marxist–Leninist vocabulary are found throughout the document such as "the fullest possible satisfaction of the people's growing material, cultural and intellectual requirements, as well as the development of their personality and their socialist relations in society" and that the economy "will develop in accordance with the economic laws of socialism on the foundation of socialist relations of production and development of the production forces".

By Burnham's death on 6 August 1985, the country had moved into an authoritarian direction. At the beginning, his successor Desmond Hoyte stood by Burnham's policies, saying a couple of months after his death: "Our ultimate goal must be the same as his—creation a socialist society in the Cooperative Republic of Guyana. We must reaffirm our commitment and rededicate ourselves to the pursuit of this objective". The early 1990s saw the Hoyte government attempt to democratize society. As long as the United States was the "uncontested political hegemon, where their ideas permeated all other structures", the creation of a socialist political system was considered as untenable. In a further shift, the Hoyte government allowed for free and fair elections. The PPP is still committed to establishing a society based on Marxist–Leninist principles and "to build a socialist society and ultimately to construct a communist society". However, the PPP stopped calling for the establishment of a socialist state after the Revolutions of 1989. PNC and PPP remain the dominant parties in Guyanese politics.

=== India ===
The Constitution of India was amended in 1976 for the 42nd time. The Indian National Congress government of Indira Gandhi changed the preamble from "sovereign democratic republic" to "sovereign socialist secular democratic republic" to emphasize the secular nature of the Indian state.

=== Nepal ===
All the major political forces in Nepal subscribe to one form of socialism and the country's founding document stresses the importance of its socialist nature. The two largest Marxist–Leninist parties with powered help from China merged to establish the Nepal Communist Party which could not live long and split within two years of merger. The Nepalese Civil War ended with the 2006 Nepalese revolution. On 28 May 2008, a republic under an interim constitution was proclaimed. The Constitution of Nepal adopted in 2015 states that "Nepal is an independent, indivisible, sovereign, secular, inclusive democratic, socialism-oriented federal democratic republican state".

=== Nicaragua ===
After the Nicaraguan Revolution, the socialist Sandinistas established the Junta of National Reconstruction in 1979. The multiparty elections were held in 1984 and Daniel Ortega became a regular president the next year. The Constitution of Nicaragua passed in 1987 stresses the importance of maintaining a socialist system and process of government. Ortega and the Sandanistas were defeated in the 1990 election. In 1995, the references to socialism were removed. In 2006, Ortega returned to power and in 2014, the references to socialism were restored. Since a 2025 constitutional amendment, Nicaragua has defined itself as a revolutionary socialist state based on Christian values, socialist ideals, and solidarity. |}

=== Portugal ===
Following the Carnation Revolution that put an end to the Estado Novo, a new constitution was adopted in 1976. A leftist coup had been put down on 25 November 1975 and there was much discussion nationwide on the viability of establishing a socialist system of governance. There was uncertainty in certain parts of the country that the armed forces would not respect the constitution. Likewise, many members of parliament were not committed to liberal democracy. About 60% of MPs represented leftist forces, representing either the Socialist Party, the Communist Party, the People's Socialist Front or the People's Democratic Union. The two right-leaning parties Democratic and Social Centre (CDS) and Popular Democratic Party (later Social Democratic Party; PSD) adopted more centrist or left-leaning programs and avoided to accept former leaders as party members.

Eventually, the Constituent Assembly adopted a liberal democratic constitution. The constitution was ideologically charged and had numerous references to socialism, workers rights, the desirability of a socialist economy and it restricted private enterprise. These articles were advanced by both communist and socialists representatives. The document stated that the republic's goal was "to ensure the transition to socialism" and urged the state to "socialise the means of production and abolish the exploitation of man by man", the last phrase echoing Karl Marx's The Communist Manifesto. Also noteworthy was that workers' committees were established in enterprises and were given the right to supervise management and have their representatives elected to the boards of state-owned companies. The document was considered as a compromise and even before the constitution was passed politicians agreed that changes to the constitution would be prohibited for a five-year period (until 1981). The CDS, the Portuguese party furthest to the right with representation, refused to ratify it.

The right-wing Democratic Alliance won a majority in the 1980 legislative election. However, they lacked the two-thirds majority to change the constitution alone. In the first amendments to the constitution in 1982, the governing coalition failed to remove the provisions on socialist economics. Nonetheless, these provisions had not been implemented. After the 1987 legislative election in which the right-wing party PSD won a majority, the constitution was amended yet again. This time, most of the constitution's ideological language was eliminated and the economic restrictions put in place in the original were removed. After these amendments, there remains only one reference to socialism, in the preamble of the constitution, which states that the Constituent Assembly respects the people's will to "open up a path towards a socialist society", although this term is very general and ambiguous. Through these changes, the government could initiate the privatization of state-owned enterprises nationalized after the revolution.

=== Sri Lanka ===
The first constitution of Sri Lanka, adopted on 22 May 1972, promised "the progressive advancement towards the establishment in Sri Lanka of a Socialist democracy" and to put an end to "economic and social privilege, disparity and exploitation". Despite the uprising the year earlier by the emerging Marxist–Leninist People's Liberation Front, the inclusion of the term socialist democracy did not create controversy. Another reason is that all Sri Lankan parties call themselves socialists, even the United National Party (UNP) which is considered right-wing. On that note, the UNP proposed during the 1977 parliamentary elections to establish "a mandate to draft, adopt and operate a new Republican Constitution in order to achieve the goal of a democratic socialist society". The name of the country became the Democratic Socialist Republic of Sri Lanka when the UNP proposed a new constitution which was adopted on 7 September 1978 and is still in effect. However, the constitution removed articles devoted to state ownership in the economy and instead wrote that the state seeks to establish "a democratic socialist society whose postulates recognize the coexistence of both private and public enterprise".

=== Tanzania ===
On 26 April 1964, Tanzania became a socialist state inspired by the Marxist–Leninist model and guided by Julius Nyerere's conception of African socialism. The constitution of Tanzania was passed in 1977. In 1992, Tanzania introduced a multi-party system within a liberal democratic framework.

== In reference to denunciation ==
=== Croatia ===
The Constitution of Croatia cites the collapse of the communist system.

=== Hungary ===
The Constitution of Hungary directly criticizes its past ruling communist regime. Based on its history, the founding document explicitly denounces its socialist past.

=== Poland ===
The Constitution of Poland distinctly condemns all forms of totalitarian systems, including communism. It was the first of the Eastern Bloc socialist countries to begin the transition away from its past system.

== List of countries ==
Country	Since	Until	Duration	Form of government	Constitutional statement
People's Republic of Bangladesh	11 April 1971	12 February 2026	54 years, 307 days (Note: Socialism was redefined as "economic and social justice" between 6 April 1979 and 30 June 2011 without this time period: 23 years, 131 days.)	Multi-party parliamentary republic	Preamble: "Further pledging that it shall be a fundamental aim of the State to realise through the democratic process, a socialist society free from exploitation, a society in which the rule of law, fundamental human rights and freedoms, equality and justice, political, economic and social, will be secured for all citizens".
Co-operative Republic of Guyana	6 October 1980	–	46 years, 38 days	Multi-party presidential republic	Section 1, Article 1: "Guyana is an indivisible, secular, democratic sovereign state in the course of transition from capitalism to socialism and shall be known as the Co-operative Republic of Guyana".
Republic of India	18 December 1976	–	49 years, 330 days	Multi-party federal parliamentary republic	Preamble: "We, the people of India, having solemnly resolved to constitute India into a Sovereign Socialist Secular Democratic Republic and to secure to all its citizens".
Federal Democratic Republic of Nepal	20 September 2015	–	11 years, 54 days	Multi-party federal parliamentary republic	Section 1, Article 4: "Nepal is an independent, indivisible, sovereign, secular, inclusive democratic, socialism-oriented federal democratic republican state".
Republic of Nicaragua	1 January 1987	–	39 years, 316 days (Note: Socialist rule started on 18 July 1979 (47 years, 118 days ago) but the references of socialism in the constitution were removed between 1 February 1995 and 29 January 2014 reducing the time period with a socialist constitution to 20 years, 319 days.)	Dominant-party presidential republic	Section 1, Article 5: "Liberty, justice, respect for the dignity of the human person, political and social pluralism, the recognition of the distinct identity of the indigenous peoples and those of African descent within the framework of a unitary and indivisible state, the recognition of different forms of property, free international cooperation and respect for the free self-determination of peoples, Christian values, socialist ideals, and practices based on solidarity, and the values and ideals of the Nicaraguan culture and identity, are the principles of the Nicaraguan nation. [...] The socialist ideals promote the common good over individual egoism, seeking to create an ever more inclusive, just and fair society, promoting an economic democracy which redistributes national wealth and eliminates exploitation among human beings".
Portuguese Republic	2 April 1976	–	50 years, 225 days	Multi-party semi-presidential republic	Preamble: "The Constituent Assembly affirms the Portuguese people's decision to [...] open up a path towards a socialist society".
Democratic Socialist Republic of Sri Lanka	7 September 1978	–	48 years, 67 days	Multi-party semi-presidential republic	Preamble: "[...] to constitute Sri Lanka into a democratic socialist republic whilst ratifying the immutable republican principles of representative democracy, and assuring to all peoples freedom, equality, justice, fundamental human rights and the independence of the judiciary".
United Republic of Tanzania	1 July 1992	–	34 years, 135 days (Note: The country was united under a socialist government on 26 April 1964 (62 years, 215 days ago) but the interim constitution did not reference socialism. The current constitution was passed under one-party rule on 16 March 1977 (49 years, 242 days ago).)	Dominant-party semi-presidential republic	Section 1, Article 3: "The United Republic is a democratic, secular and socialist state which adheres to multi-party democracy".

== List of countries with references to socialist liberation movements ==
Most of these countries were before the 1990s one-party states under their former liberation movement and their constitutions had direct references to socialism but these were removed after democratization leaving only references to their wars of national liberation. They often kept some socialist imagery in their national symbols or their official remained people's republic or democratic republic.

Country	Since	Duration	Form of government	Constitutional statement
People's Democratic Republic of Algeria	23 February 1989	37 years, 263 days	Multi-party semi-presidential republic	Preamble: "Gathered in the national movement and later within the National Front of Liberation, the Algerian people have made great sacrifices in order to assume their collective destiny in the framework of recovered freedom and cultural identity and to build authentic people's democratic constitutional institutions. The National Front of Liberation crowned the sacrifices of the best sons of Algeria during the people's war of liberation with independence and built a modern and full sovereign State". The National Liberation Front, which remains the dominant party, is a political party based on Arab socialism and the original intention of the FLN was to "mobilize[], supervise[] and educate[] the popular masses for the achievement of socialism".
Republic of Guinea-Bissau	9 May 1991	35 years, 188 days	Multi-party semi-presidential republic	Preamble: "The Party for the Independence of Guinea and Cape Verde (PAIGC), founded on September 19th, 1956, has accomplished in an exemplary manner its Minimum Plan, which consisted in the liberation of the people of Guinea and Cape Verde, winning the sovereignty of the respective States and, at the same time, launching the foundations for the construction of a free, democratic and socially just nation in each country. After independence, the Party garnered sympathy, respect and admiration, in both national and international spheres, for the way in which it has conducted the destiny of the Guinean Nation, notably through the creation and institutional development of the State apparatus." The PAIGC is a political party based on African socialism and under which's rule the state was defined as "anti-colonialist and anti-imperialist".
Democratic Republic of São Tomé and Príncipe	20 September 1990	36 years, 54 days	Multi-party semi-presidential republic	Preamble: "On 12th July, 1975, under the enlightened direction of the Liberation Movement of S. Tome and Principe—M.L.S.T.P, the Sao Tomean People attained their National Independence and proclaimed before Africa and all Humanity the Democratic Republic of S. Tome and Principe. That victory, the greatest of our History only was possible thanks to the sacrifices and to the determination of valiant sons of S. Tome and Principe who, for centuries, always resisted the colonial presence, and in 1960 organized themselves in C.L.S.T.P. and later on, in 1972 in M.L.S.T.P., until achieving the supreme objective of national liberation. With the proclamation of National Independence, the Representative Assembly of the S. Tomean People entrusted to the Political Bureau of the M.L.S.T.P., through a stipulation in the 3rd Article of the Fundamental Law then approved, the heavy responsibility of, as the highest political organ of the Nation, assuming the leadership of the society and of the State in S. Tome and Principe, targeting the noble objective of guaranteeing independence and national unity, through the building of a Democratic State in accordance with the maximum plan of the M.L.S.T.P." The MLSTP is a political party based on African socialism and the original constitution stated that the people will continue "path of democratic and popular revolution […] defined in the M.L.S.T.P. program".
Democratic Republic of Timor-Leste	20 May 2002	24 years, 177 days	Multi-party semi-presidential republic	Preamble: "Following the liberation of the Timorese People from colonisation and illegal occupation of the Maubere Motherland by foreign powers, the independence of East Timor, proclaimed on the 28 th of November 1975 by Frente Revolucionária do Timor-Leste Independente (FRETILIN), is recognised internationally on the 20 th of May 2002. […] The struggle waged against the enemy, initially under the leadership of FRETILIN, gave way to more comprehensive forms of political participation, particularly in the wake of the establishment of the National Council of the Maubere Resistance (CNRM) in 1987 and the National Council of Timorese Resistance (CNRT) in 1998." The Fretilin is a socialist political party and ruled the country before the Indonesian occupation which had a more socialist constitution defining the state as "anti-colonialist, anti-neocolonialist and anti-imperialist".

== See also ==
- List of communist states
- List of non-communist socialist states
