= Women senators =

Women senators may refer to:

- List of female members of Seanad Éireann, the upper house in Ireland
- List of female senators of the Philippines
- Women in the Australian Senate
- Women in the French Senate
- Women in the United States Senate
- Women in the Sri Lankan Parliament, includes current female Senators
- Women in the 44th Canadian Parliament, includes current female Senators

== See also ==
- Women in Congress (disambiguation)
- Women in the House (disambiguation)
- Women in House of Representatives (disambiguation)
- Women in Parliament (disambiguation)
