= Women in the House of Representatives =

Women in House of Representatives or House of Representatives women may refer to:

- Women in the Australian House of Representatives
- Women in the United States House of Representatives
- Women in the Sri Lanka House of Representatives; see Women in the Parliament of Sri Lanka
- Women in the House of Representatives of Jamaica

== See also ==
- Women in Congress (disambiguation)
- Women in the House (disambiguation)
- Women in Parliament (disambiguation)
- Women in the Senate (disambiguation)
- Women in government
- Assemblywomen (play)
