= People's republic =

Title used by some republican states

Map of states using the name people's republic: Current Former

People's republic is an official title that is mostly used by current and former communist states, as well as other left-wing governments. It is mainly associated with soviet republics, communist states that self-designate as people's democratic states, sovereign states with a democratic-republican constitution that usually mentions socialism, as well as some countries that do not fit into any of these categories.

A number of the short-lived socialist states that formed during World War I and its aftermath called themselves people's republics. Many of these sprang up in the territory of the former Russian Empire, which had collapsed in 1917 as a result of the Russian Revolution. Decades later, following the Allied victory in World War II, the name "people's republic" was adopted by some of the newly established Marxist–Leninist states, mainly within the Soviet Union's Eastern Bloc.

As a term, people's republic is associated with socialist states as well as communist countries adhering to Marxism–Leninism, although its use is not unique to such states. A number of republics with liberal democratic political systems such as Algeria and Bangladesh adopted the title, given its rather generic nature, after popular wars of independence. Nonetheless, such countries still usually mention socialism in their constitutions.

== Non-Marxist–Leninist people's republics ==
The collapse of the European empires during and following World War I resulted in the creation of a number of short-lived non-Leninist people's republics during the revolutions of 1917–1923. In many cases, these governments were unrecognised and often had Leninist rivals.

The Russian Empire produced several non-Leninist people's republics after the October Revolution. The Crimean People's Republic was opposed to the Bolsheviks and the latter went on to capture its territory and establish the Taurida Soviet Socialist Republic. The anti-Bolshevik Kuban People's Republic was established in Russia's Kuban region and survived until the Red Army captured the area. The socialist-leaning Ukrainian People's Republic declared its independence from the Russian Republic, but it had a rival in the Ukrainian People's Republic of Soviets (later the Ukrainian Soviet Republic) whom it fought during the Ukrainian War of Independence. The Belarusian People's Republic tried to create an independent Belarusian state in land controlled by the German Imperial Army, but the Socialist Soviet Republic of Byelorussia replaced it once the German army had left. All of these territories finally became constituent parts of the Soviet Union.

In the former Austro-Hungarian Empire, the West Ukrainian People's Republic was formed in eastern Galicia under the political guidance of Greek Catholic, liberal and socialist ideologies. The territory was subsequently absorbed into the Second Polish Republic. Meanwhile, the Hungarian People's Republic was established, briefly replaced by the Hungarian Soviet Republic and eventually succeeded by the Kingdom of Hungary.

In Germany, the People's State of Bavaria (German: Volksstaat Bayern) (Note: Referred to as the Free People's State of Bavaria (German: Freier Volksstaat Bayern), or later simply as Freistaat Bayern (the present-day official name of Bavaria), the name of the state has also been translated as the Bavarian Republic and the People's Republic of Bavaria. For further discussion of the terms Freistaat and Volksstaat (de), see Free state (Germany).) was a short-lived socialist state and people's republic formed in Bavaria during the German Revolution of 1918–1919 as an attempt to establish a socialist state to replace the Kingdom of Bavaria. Its supporters clashed with the Bavarian Soviet Republic, founded five months later, before revolutionary activity was put down by elements of the German Army and the paramilitary Freikorps. The Free State of Bavaria, a state within the Weimar Republic, was then established on 15 September 1919.

During the 1960s and 1970s, a number of former colonies that had gained independence through revolutionary liberation struggles adopted the name people's republic. Examples include Algeria, Bangladesh and Zanzibar. Libya adopted the term (Note: The Arabic word translated as republic is Jamahiriya, a neologism widely interpreted to mean "state of the masses".) after its Al Fateh Revolution against King Idris.

In the 2010s, Ukraine's pro-Russian separatist movements during the Russo-Ukrainian War declared the oblasts of Donetsk and Luhansk to be people's republics, but they did not receive diplomatic recognition from the international community. In 2022 amid an ongoing invasion of Ukraine they were annexed by Russia.

=== List of non-Marxist–Leninist people's republics ===
Current non-Marxist–Leninist people's republics include:

- People's Democratic Republic of Algeria (since 1962)
- People's Republic of Bangladesh (since 1971)

Historical people's republics include:

- Belarusian People's Republic (1918–1919; partially recognized)
- (Autonomous Republic of Crimea) Crimean People's Republic (1917–1918; unrecognized)
- Donetsk People's Republic (2014–2022; partially recognized)
- People's Revolutionary Republic of Guinea (1958–1984)
- Hungarian People's Republic (1918–1919; unrecognized)
- People's Republic of Korea (1945–1946)
- Kuban People's Republic (1918–1920; unrecognized)
- (Libya) Great Socialist People's Libyan Arab Jamahiriya (1977–2011)
- Luhansk People's Republic (2014–2022; partially recognized)
- Ukrainian People's Republic (1917–1921; partially recognized)
- West Ukrainian People's Republic (1918–1919; joined the Ukrainian People's Republic)
- People's Republic of Zanzibar (1963–1964)

== Marxist–Leninist people's republics ==
All the Iron Curtain countries (except possibly Bulgaria) strenuously deny that they are dictatorships, and call themselves "people's democracies" or "people's republics." At first I thought this was only the most transparent kind of doubletalk. The Soviet Union has never bothered to disguise itself in this manner. Why should the puppets?

The answer would appear to be several. First, incredible as the fact may seem, the satellite leaders, in a perverted, self-deluded, almost-crazy way, do genuinely consider that they are "democratic." Second, they seek to pay some lip service to the democratic ideas of the West as a means of encouraging support from their own people. In other words, totalitarian as the whole region clearly is, the power of democracy in the rest of the world is still such that the men who run these countries continue to find it necessary to speak of it admiringly.

— John Gunther, 1949

The Soviet Union never called itself a people's republic; the first people's republics that came into existence were those formed following the Russian Revolution. Ukraine was briefly declared a people's republic in 1917. The Khanate of Khiva and the Emirate of Bukhara, both territories of the former Russian Empire, were transformed into people's republics in 1920. In 1921, the Russian protectorate of Tuva became a people's republic, followed in 1924 by neighbouring Mongolia. Following World War II, developments in Marxist–Leninist theory led to the appearance of people's democracy, a concept which potentially allowed for a route to socialism and dictatorship of the proletariat via multi-class, multi-party democracy. Countries which had reached this intermediate stage were called people's republics. The European states that became people's republics at this time were Albania, Bulgaria, Czechoslovakia, Hungary, Poland, Romania and Yugoslavia. In Asia, China became a people's republic following the Chinese Communist Revolution, and North Korea also became a people's republic.

Many of these countries also called themselves socialist states in their constitutions. During the 1960s, Romania and Yugoslavia ceased to use the term people's in their official names, replacing it with the term socialist as a mark of their ongoing political development. Czechoslovakia also added the term socialist into its name during this period. It had become a people's republic in 1948, but the country had not used that term in its official name. Albania used both terms in its official name from 1976 to 1991. In the West, these countries are often referred to as communist states. However, none of them described themselves in that way, as they regarded communism as a level of political development that they had not yet reached. Terms used by communist states include national-democratic, people's democratic, socialist-oriented and workers and peasants' states. The communist parties in these countries often governed in coalition with other progressive parties.

During the postcolonial period, a number of former European colonies that had achieved independence and adopted Marxist–Leninist governments took the name people's republic. Angola, Benin, Congo-Brazzaville, Ethiopia, Cambodia, Laos, Mozambique and South Yemen followed this route. Following the Revolutions of 1989, the people's republics of Central and Eastern Europe (namely Albania, Bulgaria, Hungary, and Poland), as well as Mongolia, dropped the term people's from their names due to the term's association with their former communist governments, and became known simply as republics, adopting liberal democracy as their system of government. At around the same time, most of the former European colonies that had taken the people's republic name began to replace it as part of their move away from Marxism–Leninism and towards democratic socialism or social democracy.

=== List of Marxist–Leninist people's republics ===
The current officially Marxist–Leninist states that use the term people's republic in their full names include:

- People's Republic of China (since 1949)
- (Laos) Lao People's Democratic Republic (since 1975)
- (North Korea) Democratic People's Republic of Korea (since 1948)

Historical examples include:

- People's Republic of Albania (1946–1976) and People's Socialist Republic of Albania (1976–1991)
- People's Republic of Angola (1975–1992)
- Democratic People's Republic of Angola (1975–2002; partially recognized; later abandoned marxism)
- People's Republic of Benin (1975–1990)
- Bukharan People's Soviet Republic (1920–1925)
- People's Republic of Bulgaria (1946–1990)
- (First Congolese Republic) People's Republic of the Congo (1964–1965)
- People's Republic of the Congo (1969–1992)
- People's Democratic Republic of Ethiopia (1987–1991)
- Hungarian People's Republic (1949–1989)
- Inner Mongolian People's Republic (1945)
- (Cambodia) People's Republic of Kampuchea (1979–1989)
- Khorezm People's Soviet Republic (1920–1925)
- (North Korea) Democratic People's Republic of Korea (1948–1992/2009) (Note: Although the government's official ideology is now the Juche part of the Kimilsungism–Kimjongilism policy of Kim Il Sung as opposed to orthodox Marxism–Leninism, it is still considered a socialist state. In 1992, all references to Marxism–Leninism in the Constitution of North Korea were dropped and replaced with Juche. In 2009, the constitution was quietly amended so that not only did it remove all Marxist–Leninist references present in the first draft, but it also dropped all reference to communism. However, according to North Korea: A Country Study by Robert L. Worden, Marxism–Leninism was abandoned immediately after the start of de-Stalinisation in the Soviet Union and it has been totally replaced by Juche from at least 1974 onwards.)
- (Mongolia) Mongolian People's Republic (1924–1992)
- People's Republic of Mozambique (1975–1990)
- People's Republic of Peru (1980–1992)
- Polish People's Republic (1944; 1952–1989)
- (Romania) Romanian People's Republic (1947–1965)
- Tuvan People's Republic (1921–1944)
- Ukrainian People's Republic of Soviets (1917–1918) (united into the Ukrainian Soviet Republic)
- (South Yemen) People's Democratic Republic of Yemen (1967–1990)
- (Socialist Federal Republic of Yugoslavia) Federal People's Republic of Yugoslavia (1945–1963)

Other titles commonly used by Marxist–Leninist and socialist states are democratic republic (e.g. the German Democratic Republic, the Somali Democratic Republic, or the Democratic Federal Yugoslavia between 1943 and 1946) and socialist republic (e.g. the Czechoslovak Socialist Republic and the Socialist Republic of Vietnam).

== 21st century ==
Presently five countries use the phrase People's Republic in their official names:

- People's Democratic Republic of Algeria
- People's Republic of Bangladesh
- People's Republic of China
- (Laos) Lao People's Democratic Republic
- (North Korea) Democratic People's Republic of Korea

== Other uses ==
As a term, people's republic is sometimes used by critics and satirists to describe areas perceived to be dominated by left-wing politics, such as the People's Republic of South Yorkshire.

== See also ==
- Mountain Government
- Provisional Democratic Government
- Bolivarianism
- Decolonization
- Democratic republic
- Islamic republic
- List of republics
- List of socialist states
- Narodniks
- Populism
