= Ranjith de Zoysa =

Sri Lankan politician (1962–2019)

Hon. Ranjith de Zoysa

Member of Parliament for Ratnapura District
- In office 22 April 2010 – 4 December 2019
- Succeeded by: Waruna Liyanage
- Majority: 63,078 preferential votes

Personal details
- Born: 3 May 1962 Ratnapura, Sri Lanka
- Died: 4 December 2019 (aged 57) Singapore
- Party: Sri Lanka Podujana Peramuna; Sri Lanka Freedom Party
- Other political affiliations: United People's Freedom Alliance
- Spouse: Muditha Prishanthi
- Children: 2
- Occupation: Planter
- Committees: Ministerial Consultative Committee on Plantation Industries

Thirimadura Ranjith de Zoysa (3 May 1962 – 4 December 2019) was a Sri Lankan politician and member of the Parliament of Sri Lanka. He was a member of the Sri Lanka Freedom Party and Sri Lanka Podujana Peramuna.

== Early life ==
Zoysa was born to a family of seven children from Elpitiya, Godakawela, on 3 May 1962. He received his primary education from Siddhartha Vidyalaya in Elpitiya, his secondary education from Rahula College in Elpitiya, and later studied agriculture in Aquinas University College.

== Political career ==
In the late 1980s, motivated at the time by the radical political wave of second JVP insurrection, Zoysa entered politics. He was elected chairman of the Atakalampanna Pradeshiya Sabha in 1997 and appointed chairman of the same Pradeshiya Sabha as opposition leader in 2002. Zoysa was elected to the Sabaragamuwa Provincial Council in 2004 and 2008, where he held many positions of provincial minister.

He was first elected to parliament from the Rakwana Electorate in 2010, and was re-elected in 2015. He later served as the deputy national organizer of the Joint Opposition.

In the 2019 presidential election, Zoysa was a prominent supporter of Sri Lanka Podujana Peramuna candidate Gotabaya Rajapaksa.

== Controversies ==
Zoysa was arrested for assaulting a person on 20 December 2018 and was remanded until 1 January 2019.

== Death ==
Zoysa died on 4 December 2019 while receiving treatments at a hospital in Singapore for a cardiac condition.
