= Women in Parliament =

Women in Parliament may refer to:

== Politics ==
By country, alphabetically,

- Women in the 39th Canadian Parliament
- Women in the House of Representatives of Jamaica
- List of female members of the Parliament of Northern Ireland
- Women in the Sri Lankan Parliament
- Women in the House of Commons of the United Kingdom
- Women in the House of Lords

== Other ==
- Assemblywomen (play) aka Aristophanes' Ecclesiazusae (Greek: Ἐκκλησιάζουσαι Ekklesiazousai) -- a Classical Greek play

== See also ==
- Women in Congress (disambiguation)
- Women in the Senate (disambiguation)
- Women in the House (disambiguation)
- Women in House of Representatives (disambiguation)
- Women in government
