= Women in Congress =

Women in Congress may refer to:

- Women in the United States House of Representatives
- Women in the United States Senate
- Women in the Indian National Congress; see All India Mahila Congress

== See also ==
- Women in the Senate (disambiguation)
- Women in Parliament (disambiguation)
- Women in the House (disambiguation)
- Women in House of Representatives (disambiguation)
- Women in government
- Assemblywomen (play)
