= Daya Sepali Senadheera =

Sri Lankan politician

Daya Sepali Senadheera (?- 1988) was a Sri Lankan politician.

She was nominated by the United National Party, to fill the seat of Karandeniya, following the death of her husband, Bandulahewa in January 1982. Officially taking office on 26 March 1982. Senadheera was assassinated at her home in 1988 by the Janatha Vimukthi Peramuna (JVP) during the second JVP insurrection.

== See also ==
- List of assassinations of the Second JVP Insurrection
- List of political families in Sri Lanka
- Women in the Sri Lankan Parliament
- List of members of the Sri Lankan Parliament who died in office
