= Socialist state =

Sovereign state constitutionally dedicated to the establishment of socialism

A socialist state, socialist republic, or socialist country is a sovereign state constitutionally dedicated to the establishment of socialism. This article is about states that refer to themselves as socialist states, and not specifically about communist states that refer to themselves as socialist states. It includes information on liberal democratic states with constitutional references to socialism as well as other state formations that have referred to themselves as socialist.

== Overview ==
=== Constitutional references to socialism ===
A number of countries that make references to socialism in their constitutions are not communist states. In most cases, these are constitutional references to the building of a socialist society and political principles that have little to no bearing on the structure and guidance of these country's machinery of government and economic system. The preamble to the 1976 Constitution of Portugal states that the Portuguese state has, as one of its goals, opening "the way to socialist society". Another broad example is that of Slovenia, which defines itself as a "state governed by the rule of law and a social state". Algeria, the Congo, India, and Sri Lanka have directly used the term socialist in their official constitution and name. Croatia, Hungary, and Poland directly denounce "Communism" in their founding documents in reference to their past regimes.

In these cases, the intended meaning of socialism can vary widely and sometimes the constitutional references to socialism are left over from a previous period in the country's history. In the case of many Middle Eastern states, the term socialism was often used in reference to an Arab socialist/nationalist philosophy adopted by specific regimes, such as that of Gamal Abdel Nasser and that of the various Ba'ath parties. Examples of countries directly using the term socialist in their names include the Democratic Socialist Republic of Sri Lanka and the Socialist Republic of Vietnam, while a number of countries make references to socialism in their constitutions, but not in their names. These include India and Portugal. In addition, countries such as Belarus, Colombia, France, Russia, and Spain use the varied term social state, leaving a more ambiguous meaning. In the constitutions of Croatia, Hungary, and Poland, direct condemnation is made to the respective past socialist regimes. The autonomous region of Rojava, which operates under the principles of democratic confederalism, has been described as a socialist state.

=== Other uses ===
During the post-war consensus era (1945-79), nationalisation of large industries was relatively widespread and it was not uncommon for commentators to describe some European countries as democratic socialist states seeking to move their countries toward a socialist economy. In 1956, leading British Labour Party politician and author Anthony Crosland claimed that capitalism had been abolished in Britain, although others such as Welshman Aneurin Bevan, Minister of Health in the first post-war Labour government and the architect of the National Health Service, disputed the claim that Britain was a socialist state. For Crosland and others who supported his views, Britain was a socialist state. According to Bevan, Britain had a socialist National Health Service which stood in opposition to the hedonism of Britain's capitalist society, making the following point:

The National Health service and the Welfare State have come to be used as interchangeable terms, and in the mouths of some people, as terms of reproach. Why this is so it is not difficult to understand, if you view everything from the angle of a strictly individualistic competitive society. A free health service is pure Socialism and as such, it is opposed to the hedonism of capitalist society.

Although, as in the rest of Europe, the laws of capitalism still operated fully and private enterprise dominated the economy, some political commentators claimed that during the post-war period, when socialist parties were in power, countries such as Britain and France were democratic socialist states and the same is now applied to the Nordic countries and the Nordic model. In the 1980s, the left-wing government of President François Mitterrand aimed to expand dirigisme and attempted to nationalise all French banks, but this attempt faced opposition of the European Economic Community because it demanded a free-market capitalist economy among its members. Nevertheless, public ownership in France and the United Kingdom during the height of nationalisation in the 1960s and 1970s never accounted for more than 15–20% of capital formation, further dropping to 8% in the 1980s and below 5% in the 1990s; after the rise of neoliberalism by consecutive right-wing and centrist governments.

The socialist policies practiced by parties such as the Singaporean People's Action Party (PAP) during its first few decades in power were of a pragmatic kind as characterized by its rejection of nationalisation. Despite this, the PAP still claimed to be a socialist party, pointing out its regulation of the private sector, state intervention in the economy, and social policies as evidence of this. The former Singaporean Prime Minister Lee Kuan Yew also stated that he has been influenced by the democratic socialist British Labour Party.

=== Communist states ===
Communist states categorised themselves as socialist state after having reached a specific point of social development. But a communist state had myriads of self-designations. Terms used by communist states include national democratic, people's democratic, people's republican, socialist-oriented, and workers' and peasants' states.

A people's republic is a type of communist state with a republican constitution. Although the term initially became associated with populist movements in the 19th century such as the German Völkisch movement and the Narodniks in Russia, it is now associated with Communist Party ruled states. A number of the short-lived communist states which formed during World War I and its aftermath called themselves people's republics. Many of these sprang up in the territory of the former Russian Empire following the October Revolution. Additional people's republics emerged following the Allied victory in World War II, mainly within the Eastern Bloc. In Asia, China became a people's republic following the Chinese Communist Revolution and North Korea also became a people's republic. During the 1960s, Romania and Yugoslavia ceased to use the term people's republic in their official name, replacing it with the term socialist republic as a mark of their ongoing political development. Czechoslovakia also added the term socialist republic into its name during this period. It had become a people's republic in 1948, but the country had not used that term in its official name. Albania used both terms in its official name from 1976 to 1991.

== See also ==
- Legislatures in communist states
- Soviet democracy
- Soviet (council)
- Soviet republic
- State socialism
