= Senate of Bangladesh =

Proposed upper house in Bangladesh Parliament

Coordinates: 23°45′44″N 90°22′43″E

Bangladesh Adhisod Senate of Bangladesh বাংলাদেশ অধিষদ

Type
- Type: Upper house of the Parliament of Bangladesh
- Established: 17 February 2026 to within 180 working days.

Leadership
- Chairman: TBD
- Deputy Chairman: TBD
- Leader of the House: TBD
- Leader of the Opposition: TBD
- Secretary: TBD

Structure
- Seats: 105
- Political groups: Government (56): BNP (56); Opposition (41): 11 Party Alliance (41); Jamaat (36); NCP (3); BKM (2); Crossbench (8): IAB (3); Nominated (5)
- Length of term: Up to five years

Elections
- Voting system: 100 seats elected via Proportional Representation; 5 seats nominated by the President
- First election: 12 February 2026
- Last election: 12 February 2026
- Next election: By 2031

Meeting place
- Jatiya Sangsad Bhaban, Sher-e-Bangla Nagar, Dhaka, Bangladesh

Constitution
- Constitution of Bangladesh

The Senate of Bangladesh (Bengali: বাংলাদেশ অধিষদ) is the upper house of the bicameral Parliament of Bangladesh, the lower house being the House of the Nation. It is going through transition phase following the success of the 2026 Bangladeshi constitutional referendum on February 12, 2026.

== Background ==
Since independence in 1971, Bangladesh has had a unicameral legislature, the Jatiya Sangsad. After the political reforms following the July Uprising, the National Consensus Commission has developed the July Charter, which proposes changes to the constitution, governance and election framework and creating a bicameral parliament with a Senate as the upper house.

Under the "July Charter implementation order" which has approved and gazetted in November 2025, the Senate proposal is formally included as part of the constitutional referendum question to be held alongside the 2026 general election.

== Structure ==
The Parliament of Bangladesh would be restructured into a bicameral legislature, consisting of two chambers:

Parliament of Bangladesh
National Assembly	Senate
Lower House	Upper House
Serves as the principal legislative chamber.; Members are elected from constituencies, primarily through the first-past-the-post system, along with reserved seats.	Proposed as a 100-member chamber elected through proportional representation based on national vote share in general elections.; An additional five eminent citizens would be nominated by the President as independent members.; Members would serve terms similar in length to those of the lower house.; The Senate's primary role would be to review, amend, and delay legislation passed by the House of the Nation.

=== Proposed composition according to July Charter ===
Proposed composition according to the proportional representation, and election result.

== Functions and powers ==
Under the charter’s framework:

- Legislative review: The Senate would debate and suggest changes to bills passed by the lower house.
- Constitutional amendments: Any constitutional change would require approval by a majority of the Senate, adding a check to constitutional revisions.
- The Senate is not intended to duplicate the lower house’s functions but to act as a deliberative and revisory chamber.
