= Women in the Sri Lankan Parliament =

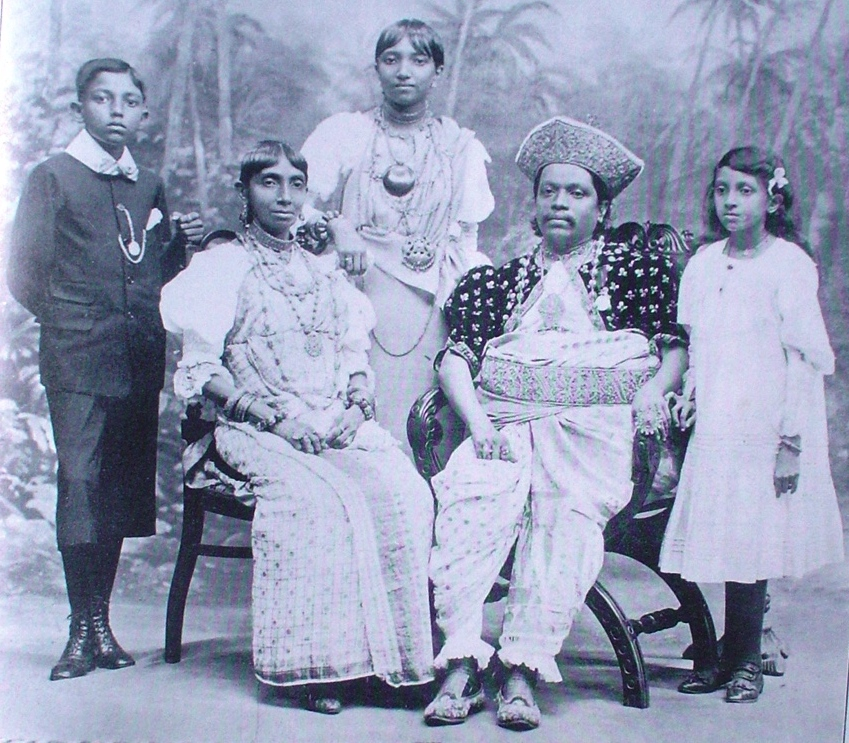
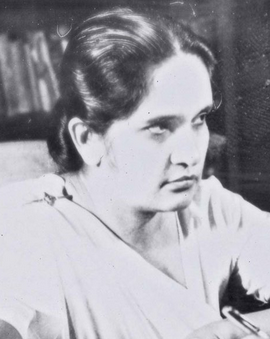
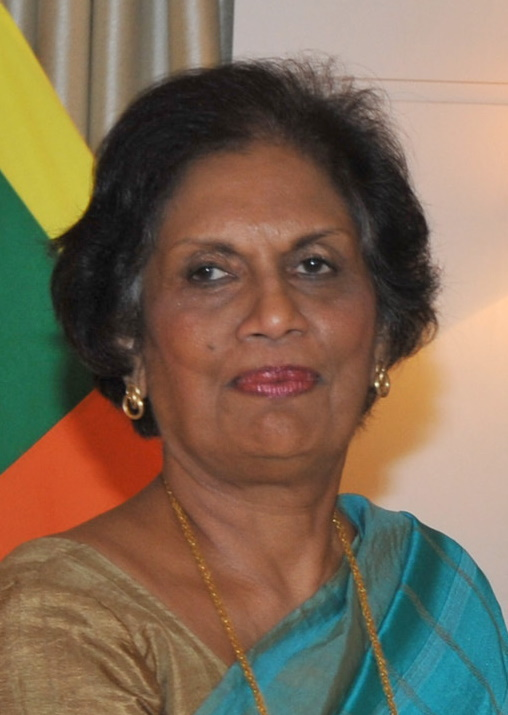
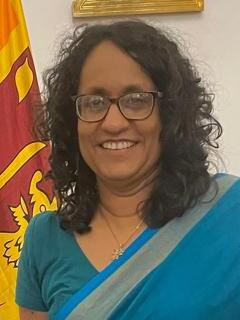
- Top left: Adeline Molamure became the first female legislator in Sri Lanka in 1931.
- Top right: Sirimavo Bandaranaike became the world's first female Prime Minister in 1960.
- Bottom left: Chandrika Kumaratunga became the second female Prime Minister and later the first female President of Sri Lanka in 1994.
- Bottom right: Harini Amarasuriya became the third female Prime Minister of Sri Lanka in 2024.

The Parliament of Sri Lanka and its predecessors (the National State Assembly, the Parliament of Ceylon and the State Council of Ceylon) have included women Members of Parliament or other applicable representatives continuously since 1931. Adeline Molamure, daughter of J. H. Meedeniya and wife of Alfred Francis Molamure, both State Councillors, was the first woman representative, elected to the State Council in the 1931 election.

Women in the Sri Lankan parliament, however small in numbers, have held high positions in Parliament and the cabinet. Three women have become Prime Minister and one has gone on to become the President of Sri Lanka. Sirimavo Bandaranaike became the world's first female head of government on 21 July 1960, holding the post for a non-consecutive 17 years. Her daughter, Chandrika Kumaratunga, became Sri Lanka's first modern female head of state and president.

The 17th Parliament of Sri Lanka, the current parliament elected in 2024, has the highest number of female legislators with 22 female MPs.

== Number of women ==
=== Number of women in Parliament by House ===
Number of women in the Sri Lankan Parliament (1931–2024):

#	Legislature	Years	in Parliament	%	in House	%	in Senate	%
1st	Ceylonese State Council	1931–1936	2	3.4%	2	3.4%	—N/a	
2nd	Ceylonese State Council	1936–1947	1	1.7%	1	1.7%	—N/a	
3rd	Ceylonese Parliament	1947–1952	1	?%	3	2.9%	4	?%
4th	Ceylonese Parliament	1952–1956	?	?%	2	1.9%	?	?%
5th	Ceylonese Parliament	1956–1959	?	?%	4	3.9%	?	?%
6th	Ceylonese Parliament	1960–1960	?	?%	3	2.9%	?	?%
7th	Ceylonese Parliament	1960–1964	?	?%	3	2.9%	?	?%
8th	Ceylonese Parliament	1965–1970	?	?%	6	5.9%	?	?%
9th	Ceylonese Parliament	1970–1972	?	?%	6	3.8%	?	?%
10th	National State Assembly	1972–1977	6	3.6%	6	3.6%	—N/a	
11th	National State Assembly	1977–1978	11	6.5%	11	6.5%	—N/a	
12th	Sri Lankan Parliament	1978–1988	11	4.8%	11	4.8%	—N/a	
13th	Sri Lankan Parliament	1989–1994	13	5.7%	13	5.7%	—N/a	
14th	Sri Lankan Parliament	1994–2000	12	5.3%	12	5.3%	—N/a	
15th	Sri Lankan Parliament	2000–2001	9	4%	9	4%	—N/a	
16th	Sri Lankan Parliament	2001–2004	10	4.4%	10	4.4%	—N/a	
17th	Sri Lankan Parliament	2004–2010	13	5.7%	13	5.7%	—N/a	
18th	Sri Lankan Parliament	2010–2015	13	5.7%	13	5.7%	—N/a	
19th	Sri Lankan Parliament	2015–2020	13	5.7%	13	5.7%	—N/a	
20th	Sri Lankan Parliament	2020–2024	12	5.3%	12	5.3%	—N/a	
21st	Sri Lankan Parliament	2024–2028	22	9.8%	22	9.8%	—N/a	

== List of female members ==
This is a complete list of women who have served as members of the successive Sri Lankan Legislatures, ordered by seniority. This list includes women who served in the past and who continue to serve in the present.

=== Service ===
Representative	Party	Electorate	Years	Notes
Adeline Molamure	—N/a	Ruwanwella	June 1931– 7 December 1935	Elected in by-election First woman to be elected to the State Council of Ceylon (first elected female legislator)
Naysum Saravanamuttu	—N/a	Colombo North	June 1931– 4 July 1947	Second woman to be elected to the State Council
Florence Senanayake	Lanka Sama Samaja Party	Kiriella	September 1947– 8 April 1952	First female to be elected to Parliament
Cissy Cooray	—N/a	—N/a	1947–1952	First female to be appointed to the Senate of Ceylon
Kusumasiri Gunawardena	Lanka Sama Samaja Party	Avissawella	1948– 18 February 1956	Second female to be elected to Parliament; Elected unopposed in by-election
Kusumasiri Gunawardena	Viplavakari Lanka Sama Samaja Party	Kiriella	April 1956– 5 December 1959	
Tamara Kumari Ilangaratne	Independent	Kandy	June 1949– 8 April 1952	Third female to be elected to Parliament; Elected in by-election
Tamara Kumari Ilangaratne	Sri Lanka Freedom Party	Galagedara	27 May 1970– 18 May 1977	
Doreen Wickremasinghe	Communist Party of Ceylon	Akuressa	May 1952– 18 February 1956	
Clodagh Jayasuriya	United National Party	—N/a	October 1953–1956	Elected to the Senate of Ceylon
Vivienne Goonewardena	Lanka Sama Samaja Party	Colombo North	April 1956– 5 December 1959	
Vivienne Goonewardena	Lanka Sama Samaja Party	Borella	20 July 1960– 17 December 1964	Elected in by-election
Vivienne Goonewardena	Lanka Sama Samaja Party	Dehiwala–Mt. Lavinia	27 May 1970– 18 May 1977	
Vimala Wijewardene	Sri Lanka Freedom Party	Mirigama	April 1956– 5 December 1959	First female cabinet minister
Kusuma Rajaratne	Independent	Welimada	September 1957– 5 December 1959	Elected in by-election
Kusuma Rajaratne	National Liberation Front	Uva–Paranagama	19 March 1960– 25 March 1970	
Evelyn de Soysa	—N/a	—N/a	April 1959–1963	Appointed member of the Senate of Ceylon
Wimala Kannangara	United National Party	Galigamuwa	19 March 1960– 23 April 1960	
Wimala Kannangara	United National Party	Galigamuwa	22 March 1965– 25 March 1970	
Wimala Kannangara	United National Party	Galigamuwa	21 July 1977– 20 December 1988	
Soma Wickremanayake	Lanka Sama Samaja Party	Dehiowita	19 March 1960– 17 December 1964	
Sirimavo Bandaranaike	Sri Lanka Freedom Party	Attanagalla	22 March 1965– 20 December 1988	Appointed Prime Minister of Sri Lanka on 21 July 1960, 29 May 1970, 22 May 1972 and 14 November 1994.
Sirimavo Bandaranaike	Sri Lanka Freedom Party	Gampaha	15 February 1989– 24 June 1994	Appointed Prime Minister of Sri Lanka on 21 July 1960, 29 May 1970, 22 May 1972 and 14 November 1994.
Sirimavo Bandaranaike	Sri Lanka Freedom Party	National List	16 August 1994– 18 August 2000	Appointed Prime Minister of Sri Lanka on 21 July 1960, 29 May 1970, 22 May 1972 and 14 November 1994.
Sivagamie Obeyesekere	Sri Lanka Freedom Party	Mirigama	22 March 1965– 18 May 1977	
Leticia Rajapaksa	Sri Lanka Freedom Party	Dodangaslanda	22 March 1965– 25 March 1970	Elected in by-election
Mallika Ratwatte	Sri Lanka Freedom Party	Balangoda	22 March 1965– 18 May 1977	Elected in by-election
Seetha Seneviratne	United National Party	Balangoda	October 1967– April 1970	Appointed member of the Senate of Ceylon
Kusala Abhayavardhana	Lanka Sama Samaja Party	Borella	27 May 1970– 18 May 1977	
Renuka Herath	United National Party	Walapane	21 July 1977– 20 December 1988	
Renuka Herath	United National Party	Nuwara Eliya	15 February 1989– 18 August 2000	
Amara Piyaseeli Ratnayake	United National Party	Wariyapola	21 July 1977– 20 December 1988	
Amara Piyaseeli Ratnayake	United National Party	Kurunegala	15 February 1989– 9 February 2010	
Sunethra Ranasinghe	—N/a	Dehiwala–Mount Lavinia	21 July 1977– 20 December 1988	Elected in by-election
Sunethra Ranasinghe	United National Party	Colombo	15 February 1989– 24 June 1994	
Rupa Sriyani Daniel	United National Party	Hewaheta	21 July 1977– 20 December 1988	Nominated
Rupa Sriyani Daniel	United National Party	National List	15 February 1989– 24 June 1994	
Ranganayaki Pathmanathan	—N/a	Pottuvil	21 July 1977– 20 December 1988	Nominated
Daya Sepali Senadheera	—N/a	Karandeniya	21 July 1977– 20 December 1988	Nominated and succeeded seat vacated by the death of her husband Bandulahewa Senadheera. Assassinated by the Janatha Vimukthi Peramuna.
Lohini Wijesiri	—N/a	Harispattuwa	21 July 1977– 20 December 1988	Nominated
Keerthilatha Abeywickrema	—N/a	Deniyaya	21 July 1977– 20 December 1988	Nominated
Samantha Karunaratne	—N/a	Rambukkana	21 July 1977– 20 December 1988	Nominated
Samantha Karunaratne	United National Party	Kegalle	15 February 1989– 24 June 1994	
Sumitha Priyangeni Abeyweera	Sri Lanka Freedom Party	Kalutara	15 February 1989– 24 June 1994	
Sujatha Dharmawardana	United National Party	Puttalam	15 February 1989– 24 June 1994	
Chandra Karunaratne	United National Party	Badulla	15 February 1989– 24 June 1994	
Rasamanohari Pulendran	United National Party	Vanni	15 February 1989– 24 June 1994	
Hema Ratnayake	Sri Lanka Freedom Party	Badulla	15 February 1989– 24 June 1994	
Hema Ratnayake	United National Party	Badulla	16 August 1994– 18 August 2000	
Daya Amarakeerthi	Sri Lanka Freedom Party	Galle	15 February 1989– 24 June 1994	
Chandrika Kumaratunga	People's Alliance	Gampaha	16 August 1994– 18 August 2000	Appointed Prime Minister of Sri Lanka on 19 August 1994, then elected President of Sri Lanka on 12 November 1994.
Sumedha G. Jayasena	People's Alliance	Monaragala	16 August 1994– 7 February 2004	
Sumedha G. Jayasena	United People's Freedom Alliance	Monaragala	2 April 2004– 3 March 2020	
Sumitha Priyangani Abeyweera	People's Alliance	Kalutara	16 August 1994– 18 August 2000	
Nirupama Rajapaksa	People's Alliance	Hambantota	16 August 1994– 18 August 2000	
Nirupama Rajapaksa	United People's Freedom Alliance	Hambantota	2 April 2004– 9 February 2010	
Pavithra Devi Wanniarachchi	People's Alliance	Ratnapura	16 August 1994– 7 February 2004	
Pavithra Devi Wanniarachchi	United People's Freedom Alliance	Ratnapura	2 April 2004– 3 March 2020	
Pavithra Devi Wanniarachchi	Sri Lanka Podujana Peramuna	Ratnapura	20 August 2020– 24 September 2024	
Srimanee Athulathmudali	People's Alliance	Colombo	16 August 1994– 18 August 2000	
Amara Badra Dissanayake	United National Party	National List	16 August 1994– 18 August 2000	
Ferial Ashraff	People's Alliance	Digamadulla	10 October 2000– 7 February 2004	
Ferial Ashraff	United People's Freedom Alliance	Digamadulla	2 April 2004– 9 February 2010	
Surangani Ellawala	People's Alliance	Ratnapura	10 October 2000– 10 October 2001	
Somakumari Tennakoon	People's Alliance	Kurunegala	10 October 2000– 7 February 2004	
Yvonne Sriyani Fernando	People's Alliance	Puttalam	10 October 2000– 10 October 2001	
Chandrani Bandara Jayasinghe	United National Party	Anuradhapura	10 October 2000– 3 March 2020	
A. R. Anjan Umma	Janatha Vimukthi Peramuna	National List	10 October 2000– 10 October 2001	
A. R. Anjan Umma	Janatha Vimukthi Peramuna	Gampaha	5 December 2001– 7 February 2004	
Larine Perera	United National Party	Puttalam	5 December 2001– 9 February 2010	
Mallika de Mel	People's Alliance	Matara	5 December 2001– 7 February 2004	
Chitra Srimathi Mantilake	United National Party	Kandy	5 December 2001– 7 February 2004	
Sujatha Alahakoon	United People's Freedom Alliance	Matale	2 April 2004– 9 February 2010	
Thalatha Atukorale	United National Party	Ratnapura	2 April 2004– 3 March 2020	
Thalatha Atukorale	Samagi Jana Balawegaya	Ratnapura	3 March 2020– 21 August 2024	
Pathmini Sithamparanathan	Tamil National Alliance	Jaffna	2 April 2004– 9 February 2010	
Thangeswary Kathiraman	Tamil National Alliance	Batticaloa	2 April 2004– 9 February 2010	
Sudarshani Fernandopulle	United People's Freedom Alliance	Gampaha	22 April 2010– 3 March 2020	
Sudarshani Fernandopulle	Sri Lanka Podujana Peramuna	Gampaha	20 August 2020– 24 September 2024	
Sriyani Wijewickrama	United People's Freedom Alliance	Digamadulla	22 April 2010– 3 March 2020	
Rosy Senanayake	United National Party	Colombo	22 April 2010– 26 June 2015	
Upeksha Swarnamali	United National Party	Gampaha	22 April 2010– 26 June 2015	
Vijayakala Maheswaran	United National Party	Jaffna	22 April 2010– 3 March 2020	
Malini Fonseka	United People's Freedom Alliance	National List	22 April 2010– 26 June 2015	
Kamala Ranathunga	United People's Freedom Alliance	National List	22 April 2010– 26 June 2015	
Anoma Gamage	United National Party	National List	22 April 2010– 3 March 2020	
Rohini Kumari Wijerathna	United National Party	Matale	1 September 2015– 3 March 2020	
Rohini Kumari Wijerathna	Samagi Jana Balawegaya	Matale	20 August 2020– present	
Hirunika Premachandra	United National Party	Colombo	1 September 2015– 3 March 2020	
Geetha Kumarasinghe	United People's Freedom Alliance	Galle	1 September 2015– 3 May 2017	
Geetha Kumarasinghe	Sri Lanka Podujana Peramuna	Galle	20 August 2020– 24 September 2024	
Thusitha Wijemanne	United National Party	Kegalle	1 September 2015– 3 March 2020	
Shanthi Sriskantharajah	Tamil National Alliance	National List	1 September 2015– 3 March 2020	
Kokila Gunawardena	Sri Lanka Podujana Peramuna	Gampaha	20 August 2020– 24 September 2024	
Seetha Arambepola	Sri Lanka Podujana Peramuna	National List	20 August 2020– 24 September 2024	
Muditha Prishanthi	Sri Lanka Podujana Peramuna	Ratnapura	20 August 2020– 24 September 2024	
Rajika Wickramasinghe	Sri Lanka Podujana Peramuna	Kegalle	20 August 2020– 24 September 2024	
Manjula Dissanayake	Sri Lanka Podujana Peramuna	National List	20 August 2020– 24 September 2024	
Harini Amarasuriya	National People's Power	National List	20 August 2020– 24 September 2024	Appointed Prime Minister of Sri Lanka on 23 September 2024.
Harini Amarasuriya	National People's Power	Colombo	21 November 2024– present	Appointed Prime Minister of Sri Lanka on 23 September 2024.
Diana Gamage	Samagi Jana Balawegaya	National List	20 August 2020– 2021	Disqualified from parliament after the Supreme Court ruled she was not a Sri Lankan citizen.
Diana Gamage	Sri Lanka Podujana Peramuna	National List	2021– 8 May 2024	Disqualified from parliament after the Supreme Court ruled she was not a Sri Lankan citizen.
Hemali Weerasekara	National People's Power	Gampaha	21 November 2024– present	
Saroja Savithri Paulraj	National People's Power	Matara	21 November 2024– present	
Sagarika Athauda	National People's Power	Kegalle	21 November 2024– present	
Kaushalya Ariyarathne	National People's Power	Colombo	21 November 2024– present	
Oshani Umanga	National People's Power	Kalutara	21 November 2024– present	
Krishnan Kaleichelvi	National People's Power	Nuwara Eliya	21 November 2024– present	
Nilanthi Kottahachchi	National People's Power	Kalutara	21 November 2024– present	
Chathuri Gangani	National People's Power	Monaragala	21 November 2024– present	
Nilusha Gamage	National People's Power	Ratnapura	21 November 2024– present	
Samanmalee Gunasinghe	National People's Power	Colombo	21 November 2024– present	
Thushari Jayasinghe	National People's Power	Kandy	21 November 2024– present	
Anushka Thilakarathne	National People's Power	Nuwara Eliya	21 November 2024– present	
Muthumenike Rathwatte	National People's Power	Ampara	21 November 2024– present	
Nayanathara Premathilake	National People's Power	Galle	21 November 2024– present	
Deepthi Wasalage	National People's Power	Matale	21 November 2024– present	
Hiruni Wijesinghe	National People's Power	Puttalam	21 November 2024– present	
Ambika Samuel	National People's Power	Badulla	21 November 2024– present	
Lakmali Hemachandra	National People's Power	National List	21 November 2024– present	
Geetha Herath	National People's Power	Kurunegala	21 November 2024– present	
Chamindrani Kiriella	Samagi Jana Balawegaya	Kandy	21 November 2024– present	

== See also ==
- Parliament of Sri Lanka
- List of female cabinet ministers of Sri Lanka
