= 2026 Bangladeshi constitutional referendum =

Abrogative referendum on constitutional reforms

- 12 February 2026
- Do you approve of the July National Charter (Constitution Amendment) Implementation Order, 2025, and the following proposals for constitutional reform as recorded in the July National Charter?; (Read the whole question)
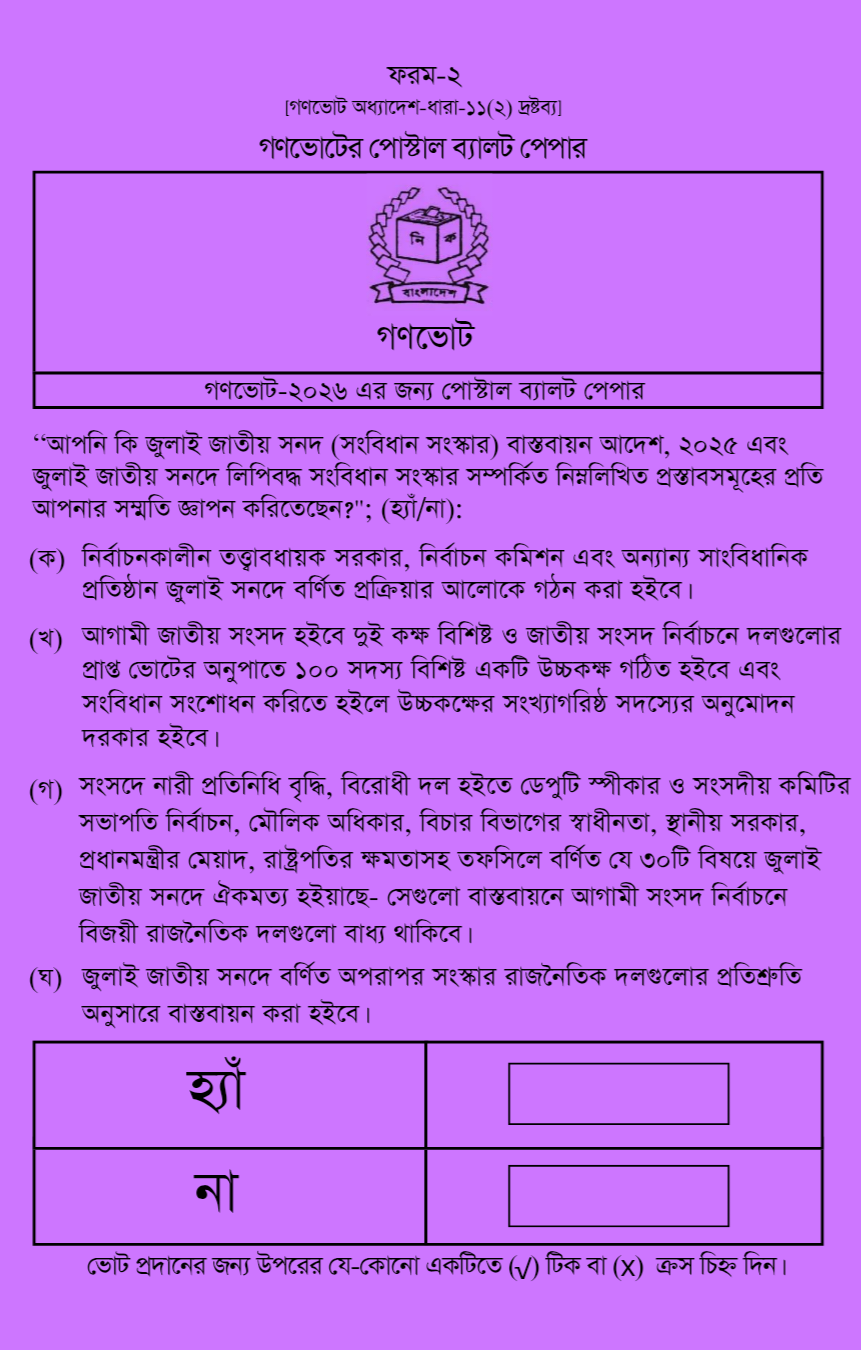
- Postal ballot paper of the referendum.
- Voting system: Popular referendum
- Outcome: July Charter passes
- Website: gonovote.gov.bd

Results
Choice	Votes	%
Yes	47,225,980	68.26%
No	21,960,231	31.74%
Valid votes	69,186,211	90.30%
Invalid or blank votes	7,435,196	9.70%
Total votes	76,621,407	100.00%
Registered voters/turnout	127,711,793	60.00%

A constitutional referendum took place in Bangladesh on 12 February 2026, alongside the general election. Voters were asked about the provisions of the July Charter and related amendments to the Constitution of Bangladesh. "July National Charter (Constitutional Amendment) Implementation Order, 2025" were issued for this purpose.

The referendum propounds reforms to countervail among state institutions — the legislature, executive, and judiciary and improve accountability in governance. If the referendum is passed, the newly elected parliament will act as a constituent assembly to enact the changes in the constitution agreed in the charter.

The "Yes" vote passed in the referendum, with 68% votes in favor on a turnout of 60%. The "Yes" vote does not, by itself, change the Constitution; it is a mandate to change the Constitution. It is considered politically binding, not legally binding.

On 26 February 2026, Bangladesh Election Commission revised referendum results and published a corrected gazette notification.

== Background ==
On 13 November 2025, the President of Bangladesh, Mohammed Shahabuddin issued the "July National Charter (Constitutional Amendment) Implementation Order, 2025" to implement the July Charter, which effectively gave the Bangladesh Election Commission authorization to organize a referendum and make the necessary legal arrangements.

This order provides for a national referendum in which voters will approve or reject the proposed reforms, including the establishment of a caretaker government and an independent election commission, the introduction of a bicameral parliament, term limits for the prime minister, enhanced presidential powers and judicial independence, and increased women's representation in parliament. If approved, a "Constitution Reform Council" composed of all newly elected members of parliament will be formed to complete the constitutional amendments within 180 working days from the date of commencement of its first session, upon which the Council shall be dissolved. While certain provisions of the order take effect immediately, others will be implemented only upon a positive referendum result, with the election commission responsible for organizing the vote and facilitating the legal process to formally incorporate the July Charter into the Constitution of Bangladesh.

== Question ==
The referendum question outlines various reforms suggested by the Reform Commissions of Bangladesh. The ballot for the referendum reads as follows:

Do you approve of the July National Charter (Constitution Amendment) Implementation Order, 2025 and the following proposals for constitutional reform as recorded in the July National Charter?

a. The caretaker government during election, the Election Commission, and other constitutional institutions shall be constituted in accordance with the process described in the July Charter.

b. The next Parliament shall be bicameral. A 100-member upper house will be formed based on the proportion of votes received by political parties in the national election, and any constitutional amendment will require approval by a majority of the upper house.

c. The 30 reform proposals on which political parties reached consensus under the July National Charter — including increased representation of women in Parliament, election of the Deputy Speaker and parliamentary committee chairs from the opposition, term limits for the Prime Minister, enhanced powers of the President, expansion of fundamental rights, judicial independence, and strengthening of local government — shall be binding on the parties that win the upcoming election.

d. Other reforms outlined in the July Charter shall be implemented according to the commitments made by political parties.

== Proposed reforms ==
=== Constitutional changes ===
If the charter is passed, the following 47 changes will be brought to the constitution:

- All mother languages spoken in Bangladesh will be recognized as used languages, alongside state language Bengali.
- "Bangladeshi" will replace "Bengali" as the nationality of the citizens of Bangladesh.
- A two-thirds majority in the proposed lower house and a simple majority in the proposed upper house of the legislature will be required to amend the constitution.
- A national referendum will be required to reform the caretaker government system.
- Articles 7(A) and 7(B) which define constitutional offenses and impose restrictions on constitutional amendments, will be abolished.
- Equality, Human dignity, Social justice, Religious freedom and Harmony will replace Mujibist ideas of Bengali nationalism, Democracy, Socialism and Secularism as fundamental principles.
- Secularism and Freedom of religion will be defined as "coexistence and due dignity of all communities shall be ensured".
- The right to uninterrupted internet service and a right to protect personal information will be added to the fundamental rights.
- Approval from the cabinet members and Leader and Deputy leader of the opposition will be required to declare a state of emergency, replacing the prime minister signature only.
- Fundamental rights will not be curtailed during a state of emergency.
- Presidential elections will be held via secret ballot, and the President will be elected by the members of the lower house.
- The President can independently appoint the heads and members of National Human Rights Commission of Bangladesh, Information Commission, Press Council, Law Commission, and Bangladesh Energy Regulatory Commission, expanding from the prime minister and the chief justice only.
- A two-thirds majority in both houses will be required to impeach the president.
- Presidential pardon will be subject to the consent of the family of the victims.
- One person cannot serve as the prime minister for more than 10 years
- The Caretaker system will be reinstated, and will be formed by the consensus among the ruling party, the main opposition and the second opposition parties.
- Bicameralism will be introduced.
- The Upper House will consist of 100 seats proportionally distributed among the votes of the elected parties in the general election.
- Reserved seats for women in the lower house will be gradually increased up to 100 seats.
- The Deputy Speaker of the Jatiya Sangsad will be elected from the opposition party.
- Article 70 will be abolished, which prohibits floor crossing.
- Any major international treaty related to the national security will require approval from both houses.
- Electoral boundary delimitation powers will be taken from the Bangladesh Election Commission and will be vested in a specialized committee set by the parliament.
- The Election Commission will be formed under the supervision of the Speaker, Deputy Speaker, Prime Minister, Leader of the Opposition, and the Chief Justice.
- The Chief Justice will be appointed from the Appellate Division, Supreme Court of Bangladesh.
- Number of the appointed justices in the appellate division will be determined by the needs of the chief justice, and appointment of justices in the high court will be solely vested on the chief justice.
- Full freedom of judiciary will be constitutionally guaranteed, necessary numbers of high court benches will be established in each division, Supreme Judicial Council will be strengthened, and the supreme court will be entrusted with the control of the appointment of lower court judges.
- An Ombudsman will be appointed under the supervision of the Speaker, Deputy Speaker, Prime Minister, Leaders of Opposition Parties, and the Justices of the Appellate Division.
- Separate committees will be formed comprising opposition parties for the appointment of the Public Service Commission, the appointment of the auditor general and comptroller, and the appointment of the Anti-Corruption Commission Chairman and Commissioner.
- A new article will be added to the constitution calling to prevent the misuse of constitutional powers.

=== Legal reforms ===
37 reforms will be brought by amending the existing acts, ordinances, executive orders, and bills:

- Special rights, limits of rights, and responsibilities of committees and members of parliament will be defined through legislation.
- Reforms brought by the interim government before the general election such law on gerrymandering, mandatory code of conduct for incumbent and former judges, establishment of the supreme court secretariat, formation of an independent criminal investigation service, increase in the manpower of the judiciary, conversion of the National Legal Aid Agency into a directorate, details of assets of judges and supporting staff, digitalization of court management, and issues related to the code of conduct for lawyers will be recognized through legislation.
- An independent and permanent Public Administration Reform Commission to implement public administration reform programs will be formed, additionally the existing Public Service Commission will be divided into Public Service Commission (General), Public Service Commission (Education), and Public Service Commission (Health).
- Comilla Division and Faridpur Division will be formed.

== Position ==
Parties	Position	Notes
Interim government	Yes	Chief Adviser Muhammad Yunus has called the voters to cast a yes vote. State institutions have also campaigned for the yes vote.
11 Party Alliance	Yes	The alliance is campaigning for a yes vote to a position in favor of necessary reforms, a system to strengthen the state and democracy, establishing people's rights, moving forward on the path of good governance, to provide necessary reforms in the state structure, establish justice, protect democratic rights for voters, an opportunity for people to express their opinions and it will pave the way for positive changes in the country's governance.
Bangladesh Nationalist Party	Yes (de jure); Unclear (de facto)	Party Chairman Tarique Rahman urged his supporters to vote "yes" in the referendum during a campaign event in Rangpur. Secretary-general Mirza Fakhrul Islam Alamgir also confirmed his party's support for the yes vote. Although there have been reports of local party leaders campaigning for a "no" vote in the referendum.
Democratic United Front	Unclear	DUF described the process as undemocratic and unconstitutional, but has not yet campaigned for a no vote.
Jatiya Party	No	Party chairman GM Quader has called the voters to cast a no vote. He claimed that the whole process was undemocratic and unconstitutional.

== Opinion polls ==
Vote share projections
Polling agency	Fieldwork dates	Date published	Sample size	Yes	No	Undecided	"Don't know"	Lead (pp)
IILD	21 Jan — 5 February 2026	9 February 2026	63,615	89.6%	9.1%	1.3%	—	80.5
EASD	18 — 31 January 2026	9 February 2026	41,500	47.8%	26.8%	11.1%	10.9%	21
Innovision Consulting	16 — 27 January 2026	30 January 2026	5,147	59.5%	6.8%	11.7%	22%	52.7

== Results ==
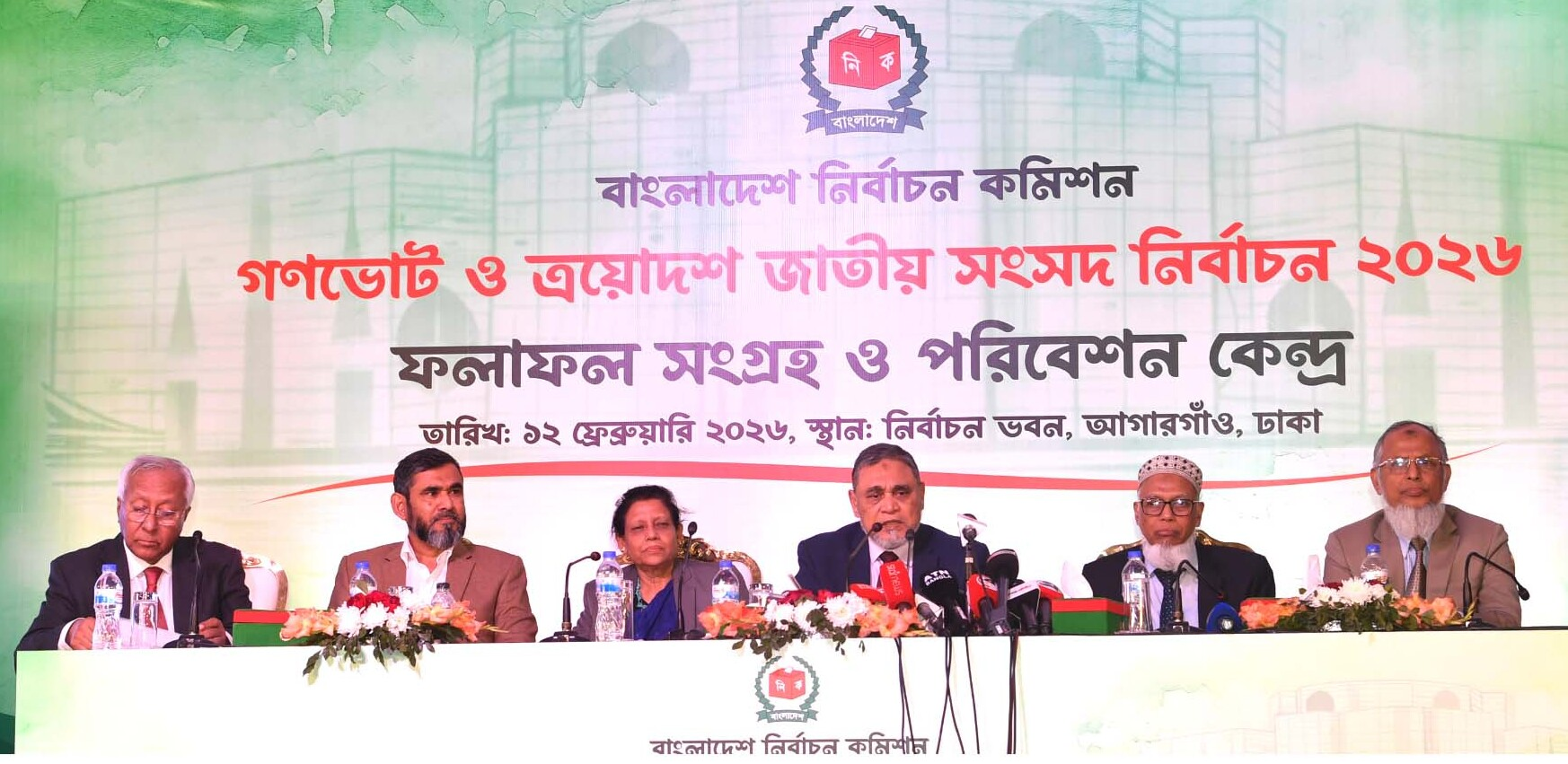
Chief Election Commissioner AMM Nasir Uddin briefing the results of the Referendum and National Parliament Election 2026.

Choice	Votes	%
For	47,225,980	68.26
Against	21,960,231	31.74
Total	69,186,211	100.00
Valid votes	69,186,211	90.30
Invalid/blank votes	7,435,196	9.70
Total votes	76,621,407	100.00
Registered voters/turnout	127,711,793	60.00
Source: Prothom Alo

== Controversy ==
The Business Standard reported some statistical and reporting anomalies in the referendum. Figures included impossible numbers such as a 244.3% turnout in Rajshahi-4 which included 612,229 votes for "No" and 145,382 for "Yes" against 319,909 registered voters, vote counts in areas of Netrokona that exceeded the number of registered voters, and discrepancies between the referendum and the parallel parliamentary elections in Sirajganj-1. However, press secretary Shafiqul Alam stated that when asked about the news that 200% of the votes were cast in a centre in the election, he said,

This is false journalism. It is basically a mistake due to currency. Whoever reported such news did so without talking to the returning officer. It was later corrected.

— Shafiqul Alam

== See also ==
- 1977 Bangladeshi presidential confidence referendum
- 1985 Bangladeshi military rule referendum
- 1991 Bangladeshi constitutional referendum
- 2026 Bangladeshi general election
