= Women in the House =

Women in the House may refer to:

- Women in the House of Commons of the United Kingdom
- Women in the House of Lords
- Women in the House of Representatives (disambiguation)

== See also ==
- Women of the House, an American sitcom television series
- Women in Congress (disambiguation)
- Women senators (disambiguation)
- Women in Parliament (disambiguation)
- Women in government
- House (legislature)
