= Muditha Prishanthi =

Sri Lankan politician

Hon. Muditha Prishanthi MP
- මුදිතා ප්‍රිෂාන්ති முடித ப்ரிசாந்தி

Member of Parliament for Ratnapura District
- Incumbent
- Assumed office 20 August 2020
- Majority: 65,933 Preferential Votes

Personal details
- Born: Muditha Prishanthi; 12 October 1968 (age 57)
- Party: Sri Lanka Podujana Peramuna
- Other political affiliations: Sri Lanka People's Freedom Alliance
- Spouse: Ranjith de Zoysa
- Children: 2

Muditha Prishanthi is a Sri Lankan politician and former member of the Sri Lankan parliament from the Ratnapura Electoral District. She is a member of the Sri Lanka Podujana Peramuna.
