= Bandulahewa Senadheera =

Sri Lankan politician (1936–1982)

Bandulahewa Senadheera (2 September 1936 – January 1982) was a Sri Lankan politician.

He was elected to parliament at the 8th parliamentary election held on 21 July 1977, representing the United National Party (UNP) in the newly created seat of Karandeniya. He received 17,790 votes (59% of the total vote), which was 6,903 votes clear of the Sri Lanka Freedom Party candidate, Wilson Wijetunga.

Bandulahewa died whilst still in office in January 1982. His wife, Daya Sepali, was appointed by the UNP to fill his parliamentary seat. She also died whilst still in office, when she was assassinated by the Janatha Vimukthi Peramuna (JVP) at their home in 1988 during the second JVP insurrection.

== See also ==
- List of political families in Sri Lanka
- List of members of the Sri Lankan Parliament who died in office
