= Karandeniya Electoral District =

Electoral district of Sri Lanka

Karandeniya electoral district was an electoral district of Sri Lanka between July 1977 and February 1989. The district was named after the town of Karandeniya in Galle District, Southern Province. The 1978 Constitution of Sri Lanka introduced the proportional representation electoral system for electing members of Parliament. The existing 160 mainly single-member electoral districts were replaced with 22 multi-member electoral districts. Karandeniya electoral district was replaced by the Galle multi-member electoral district at the 1989 general elections, the first under the proportional representation system.

== Members of Parliament ==
Key

Independent SLFP UNP

Election	Member	Party	Term
1977	Bandulahewa Senadheera	United National Party	1977 - 1982
	Daya Sepali Senadheera	United National Party	1982 - 1988

== Elections ==
=== 1977 Parliamentary General Election ===
Results of the 8th parliamentary election held on 21 July 1977:

Candidate	Party	Symbol	Votes	%
Bandulahewa Senadheera	United National Party	Elephant	17,790	58.69
Wilson Wijetunga	Sri Lanka Freedom Party	Hand	10,887	35.91
Henry Wilson Karunaratne	Communist Party of Sri Lanka	Star	950	3.13
Francis Tudawe		Lamp	274	0.90
Pinikahane Saddhatissa Thero		Chair	198	0.65
Ananda Wijeratne		Umbrella	138	0.46
Valid Votes			30,237	99.75
Rejected Votes			77	0.25
Total Polled			30,314	100.0
Registered Electors			34,918	
Turnout				86.81

In January 1982 Senadheera died, his parliamentary position was filled by his wife, Daya Sepali. She was assassinated in 1988 by the Janatha Vimukthi Peramuna (JVP).
