= July Charter =

2025 Bangladeshi political declaration

July National Charter 2025 জুলাই জাতীয় সনদ ২০২৫
- Type: Charter
- Context: July Uprising
- Drafted: February 13, 2025
- Signed: October 17, 2025
- Location: South Plaza of the Jatiya Sangsad Bhaban; Sher-e-Bangla Nagar, Dhaka, Bangladesh
- Mediators: National Consensus Commission
- Negotiators: National Consensus Commission
- Signatories: See here
- Parties: Interim government of Muhammad Yunus; 26 political parties
- Language: Bengali

The July National Charter 2025 (Bengali: জুলাই জাতীয় সনদ ২০২৫) is a political declaration in Bangladesh based on the consensus between 30 political parties and the interim government over the constitutional, electoral, and administrative reforms in the aftermath of the July Uprising in 2024. It was signed on 17 October 2025 at South Plaza of the Jatiya Sangsad by the National Consensus Commission and 24 political parties of Bangladesh, with other two parties signing later, bringing the total to 26 political parties.

Over 80 reform proposals have been proposed in the charter, including constitutional, judicial and legislative reforms. Key proposals include increasing women's political representation in the legislature, imposing prime ministerial term limits, enhancing presidential powers, expanding fundamental rights, and protecting judicial freedom. However, some signatory parties have expressed disagreement to certain proposals, leading the analysts to question the proper implementation of the provisions of the charter.

== Draft ==
The July Charter follows the July Uprising, in July 2024. A preliminary draft of the July Charter, intended to bring reform to the Constitution of Bangladesh, was released on 28 July 2025, following a series of consultations involving the 30 political parties and the interim government under Muhammad Yunus. These discussions were facilitated by the National Consensus Commission, a commission formed by the Chief Adviser Muhammad Yunus to draft the document. After further deliberation and review, the participating parties are expected to formally sign and adopt the final version of the charter. The charter consists of 28 points. On 31 July 2025, protesters injured during the July Uprising blockaded Dhaka's Shahbag intersection, demanding the immediate declaration of the "July Charter" and "July Declaration". The demonstration caused major traffic disruption, with participants vowing to continue until their demands are fulfilled.

=== Objectives ===
The commitments of the Charter include:

1. Ensuring its full implementation in accordance with public aspirations and sacrifices;
2. Enacting recommendations related to governance, the judiciary, elections, public administration, law enforcement, and anti-corruption through necessary constitutional amendments, legal revisions, or new legislation;
3. Completing these reforms within two years of the formation of a government elected after the Charter's formal adoption;
4. Establishing legal and constitutional safeguards throughout the implementation process;
5. Guaranteeing full legal and constitutional protection for the Charter's contents; and
6. Formally recognizing, within the Constitution, the historical significance of the 2024 pro-democracy movement and popular uprising that led to the Charter.

== Finalisation and signature ==
The July Charter was finalised in August 2025 after weeks of consensus talks. During the process, 11 notes of dissent, 9 of which came from the BNP and its allies, were filed to register disagreement with some key aspects of the July Charter. However, commission vice-president Ali Riaz remained optimistic about the implementation of the Charter.

The charter was signed on 17 October 2025 at South Plaza of the Jatiya Sangsad by the National Consensus Commission and 24 political parties of Bangladesh. The Gano Forum signed the charter on 19 October 2025. The National Citizen Party signed the charter on 16 February 2026, bringing the total number of signatory to 26 political parties.

=== Signatories ===
No.	Party/Alliance	Signatories	Date
–	Interim government of Bangladesh; National Consensus Commission	Muhammad Yunus	17 October 2025
–	Interim government of Bangladesh; National Consensus Commission	Ali Riaz	17 October 2025
–	Interim government of Bangladesh; National Consensus Commission	Iftekharuzzaman	17 October 2025
–	Interim government of Bangladesh; National Consensus Commission	Md. Emdadul Haque Azad	17 October 2025
–	Interim government of Bangladesh; National Consensus Commission	Badiul Alam Majumdar	17 October 2025
–	Interim government of Bangladesh; National Consensus Commission	Safar Raj Hossain	17 October 2025
–	Interim government of Bangladesh; National Consensus Commission	Muhammad Ayub Mia	17 October 2025
1	Liberal Democratic Party	Redwan Ahmed	17 October 2025
1	Liberal Democratic Party	Neyamul Bashir	17 October 2025
2	Khelafat Majlis	Abdul Basit Azad	17 October 2025
2	Khelafat Majlis	Ahmad Abdul Quader	17 October 2025
3	Rastro Sonskar Andolan	Hasnat Quaiyum	17 October 2025
3	Rastro Sonskar Andolan	Syed Hasibuddin Hossain	17 October 2025
4	Amar Bangladesh Party	Mujibur Rahman Bhuiyan Monju	17 October 2025
4	Amar Bangladesh Party	Asaduzzaman Fuaad	17 October 2025
5	Nagorik Oikko	Mahmudur Rahman Manna	17 October 2025
5	Nagorik Oikko	Shahidullah Kaiser	17 October 2025
6	National Democratic Movement	Bobby Hajjaj	17 October 2025
6	National Democratic Movement	Mominul Amin	17 October 2025
7	Bangladesh Nationalist Party	Mirza Fakhrul Islam Alamgir	17 October 2025
7	Bangladesh Nationalist Party	Salahuddin Ahmed	17 October 2025
8	Bangladesh Khelafat Majlish	Yusuf Ashraf	17 October 2025
8	Bangladesh Khelafat Majlish	Jalaluddin Ahmed	17 October 2025
9	Bangladesh Jamaat-e-Islami	Syed Abdullah Muhammad Taher	17 October 2025
9	Bangladesh Jamaat-e-Islami	Mia Golam Parwar	17 October 2025
10	Ganosamhati Andolon	Zonayed Saki	17 October 2025
10	Ganosamhati Andolon	Abul Hasan Rubel	17 October 2025
11	Jatiya Samajtantrik Dal (Rab)	Shahid Uddin Mahmud Swapan	17 October 2025
11	Jatiya Samajtantrik Dal (Rab)	Tania Rob	17 October 2025
12	Gono Odhikar Parishad	Nurul Haque Nur	17 October 2025
12	Gono Odhikar Parishad	Md. Rashed Khan	17 October 2025
13	Revolutionary Workers Party of Bangladesh	Saiful Haque	17 October 2025
13	Revolutionary Workers Party of Bangladesh	Bahnishikha Jamali	17 October 2025
14	Nationalist Like-minded Alliance	Fariduzzaman Farhad (NPP)	17 October 2025
14	Nationalist Like-minded Alliance	Khondaker Lutfar Rahman (JAGPA)	17 October 2025
15	12-party Alliance	Mostafa Jamal Haider	17 October 2025
15	12-party Alliance	Shahadat Hossain Selim	17 October 2025
16	Islami Andolan Bangladesh	Ashraf Ali Akon	17 October 2025
16	Islami Andolan Bangladesh	Gazi Ataur Rahman	17 October 2025
17	Zaker Party	Shahidul Islam Bhuiyan	17 October 2025
17	Zaker Party	Zahirul Hasan Sheikh	17 October 2025
18	Gano Front	Aminul Haque Tipu Biswas	17 October 2025
18	Gano Front	Manjurul Arefin Litu Biswas	17 October 2025
19	Nizam-e-Islam Party	Abdul Majed Athari	17 October 2025
19	Nizam-e-Islam Party	Musa Bin Izhar	17 October 2025
20	Bangladesh Labour Party	Mostafizur Rahman Iran	17 October 2025
20	Bangladesh Labour Party	Khondaker Mirajul Islam	17 October 2025
21	Bhasani Janashakti Party	Sheikh Rafiqul Islam Bablu	17 October 2025
21	Bhasani Janashakti Party	Mohammad Abu Yusuf Selim	17 October 2025
22	Jamiat Ulema-e-Islam Bangladesh	Abdur Rob Yousufi	17 October 2025
22	Jamiat Ulema-e-Islam Bangladesh	Manjurul Islam Afendi	17 October 2025
23	Islami Oikya Jote	Abdul Kader	17 October 2025
23	Islami Oikya Jote	Sakhawat Hossain Raji	17 October 2025
24	Amjanatar Dol	Mia Moshiuzzaman	17 October 2025
24	Amjanatar Dol	Md. Tariq Rahman	17 October 2025
25	Gano Forum	Subrata Chowdhury	19 October 2025
25	Gano Forum	Md. Mizanur Rahman	19 October 2025
26	National Citizen Party	Nahid Islam	16 February 2026
26	National Citizen Party	Akhter Hossen	16 February 2026

== Proposals ==
=== Constitutional changes ===
If the charter is passed, the following 47 changes will be brought to the constitution:

- All mother languages spoken in Bangladesh will be recognized as used languages, alongside state language Bengali.
- "Bangladeshi" will replace "Bengali" as the nationality of the citizens of Bangladesh.
- A two-thirds majority in the proposed lower house and a simple majority in the proposed upper house of the legislature will be required to amend the constitution.
- A national referendum will be required to reform the caretaker government system.
- Articles 7(A) and 7(B) which define constitutional offenses and impose restrictions on constitutional amendments, will be abolished.
- Equality, Human dignity, Social justice, Religious freedom and Harmony will replace Mujibist ideas of Bengali nationalism, Democracy, Socialism and Secularism as fundamental principles.
- Secularism and Freedom of religion will be defined as "coexistence and due dignity of all communities shall be ensured".
- The right to uninterrupted internet service and a right to protect personal information will be added to the fundamental rights.
- Approval from the cabinet members and Leader and Deputy leader of the opposition will be required to declare a state of emergency, replacing the prime minister signature only.
- Fundamental rights will not be curtailed during a state of emergency.
- Presidential elections will be held via secret ballot, and the President will be elected by the members of the lower house.
- The President can independently appoint the heads and members of National Human Rights Commission of Bangladesh, Information Commission, Press Council, Law Commission, and Bangladesh Energy Regulatory Commission, expanding from the prime minister and the chief justice only.
- A two-thirds majority in both houses will be required to impeach the president.
- Presidential pardon will be subject to the consent of the family of the victims.
- One person cannot serve as the prime minister for more than 10 years
- The Caretaker system will be reinstated, and will be formed by the consensus among the ruling party, the main opposition and the second opposition parties.
- Bicameralism will be introduced.
- The Upper House will consist of 100 seats proportionally distributed among the votes of the elected parties in the general election.
- Reserved seats for women in the lower house will be gradually increased up to 100 seats.
- The Deputy Speaker of the Jatiya Sangsad will be elected from the opposition party.
- Article 70 will be abolished, which prohibits floor crossing.
- Any major international treaty related to the national security will require approval from both houses.
- Electoral boundary delimitation powers will be taken from the Bangladesh Election Commission and will be vested in a specialized committee set by the parliament.
- The Election Commission will be formed under the supervision of the Speaker, Deputy Speaker, Prime Minister, Leader of the Opposition, and the Chief Justice.
- The Chief Justice will be appointed from the Appellate Division, Supreme Court of Bangladesh.
- Number of the appointed justices in the appellate division will be determined by the needs of the chief justice, and appointment of justices in the high court will be solely vested on the chief justice.
- Full freedom of judiciary will be constitutionally guaranteed, necessary numbers of high court benches will be established in each division, Supreme Judicial Council will be strengthened, and the supreme court will be entrusted with the control of the appointment of lower court judges.
- An Ombudsman will be appointed under the supervision of the Speaker, Deputy Speaker, Prime Minister, Leaders of Opposition Parties, and the Justices of the Appellate Division.
- Separate committees will be formed comprising opposition parties for the appointment of the Public Service Commission, the appointment of the auditor general and comptroller, and the appointment of the Anti-Corruption Commission Chairman and Commissioner.
- A new article will be added to the constitution calling to prevent the misuse of constitutional powers.

=== Legal reforms ===
37 reforms will be brought by amending the existing acts, ordinances, executive orders, and bills:

- Special rights, limits of rights, and responsibilities of committees and members of parliament will be defined through legislation.
- Reforms brought by the interim government before the general election such law on gerrymandering, mandatory code of conduct for incumbent and former judges, establishment of the supreme court secretariat, formation of an independent criminal investigation service, increase in the manpower of the judiciary, conversion of the National Legal Aid Agency into a directorate, details of assets of judges and supporting staff, digitalization of court management, and issues related to the code of conduct for lawyers will be recognized through legislation.
- An independent and permanent Public Administration Reform Commission to implement public administration reform programs will be formed, additionally the existing Public Service Commission will be divided into Public Service Commission (General), Public Service Commission (Education), and Public Service Commission (Health).
- Comilla Division and Faridpur Division will be formed.

== Implementation ==
=== July National Charter (Constitutional Amendment) Implementation Order, 2025 ===
On 13 November 2025, the President of Bangladesh, Mohammed Shahabuddin issued the "July National Charter (Constitutional Amendment) Implementation Order, 2025" to implement the July Charter, which effectively gave the Bangladesh Election Commission authorization to organize a referendum and make the necessary legal arrangements.

This order provides for a national referendum in which voters will approve or reject the proposed reforms, including the establishment of a caretaker government and an independent election commission, the introduction of a bicameral parliament, term limits for the prime minister, enhanced presidential powers and judicial independence, and increased women’s representation in parliament. If approved, a "Constitution Reform Council" composed of all newly elected members of parliament will be formed to complete the constitutional amendments within 180 working days from the date of commencement of its first session, upon which the Council shall be dissolved. While certain provisions of the order take effect immediately, others will be implemented only upon a positive referendum result, with the election commission responsible for organizing the vote and facilitating the legal process to formally incorporate the July Charter into the Constitution of Bangladesh.

=== Constitutional Referendum ===
A constitutional referendum took place in Bangladesh on 12 February 2026, alongside the general election. Voters were asked about the provisions of the July Charter and related amendments to the Constitution of Bangladesh.

Choice	Votes	%
For	47,225,980	68.26
Against	21,960,231	31.74
Total	69,186,211	100.00
Valid votes	69,186,211	90.30
Invalid/blank votes	7,435,196	9.70
Total votes	76,621,407	100.00
Registered voters/turnout	127,711,793	60.00
Source: Prothom Alo

== Reactions ==
Bangladesh Nationalist Party and many more remained neutral but stated that it would benefit some parties even more, notably the student-led party National Citizen Party. BNP later said that it supported state recognition of the charter, but opposed incorporating the July Charter in the constitution.

While the National Citizen Party first refrained from signing the charter demanding its legality immediately, later signed on 16 February 2026. The Communist Party of Bangladesh, Socialist Party of Bangladesh, Socialist Party of Bangladesh (Marxist) and Bangladesh Jatiya Samajtantrik Dal refrained from signing the charter alleging that it distorts the history of the Bangladesh Liberation War and alters the constitutional principles.

== Gallery ==
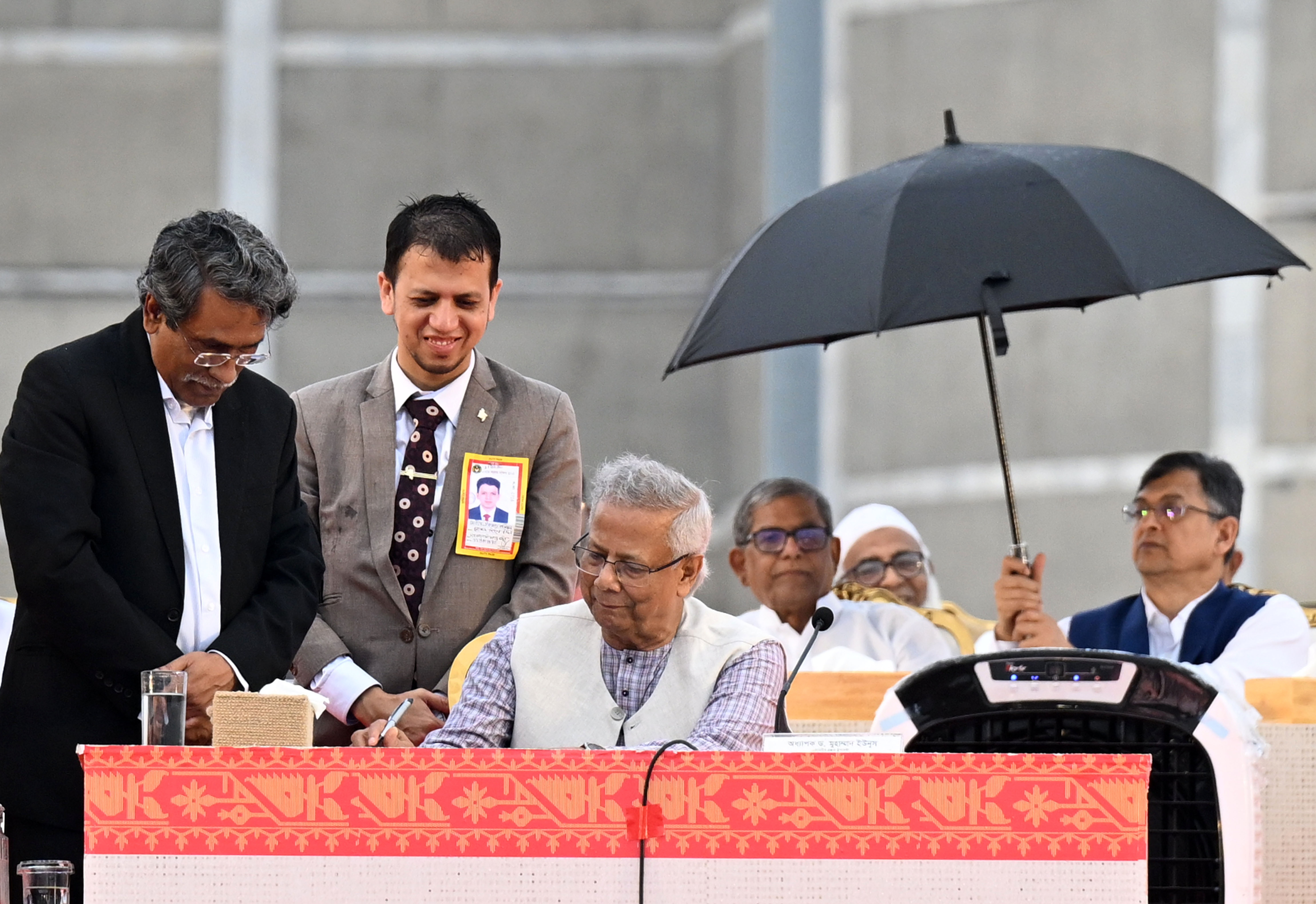
Muhammad Yunus signing the July Charter

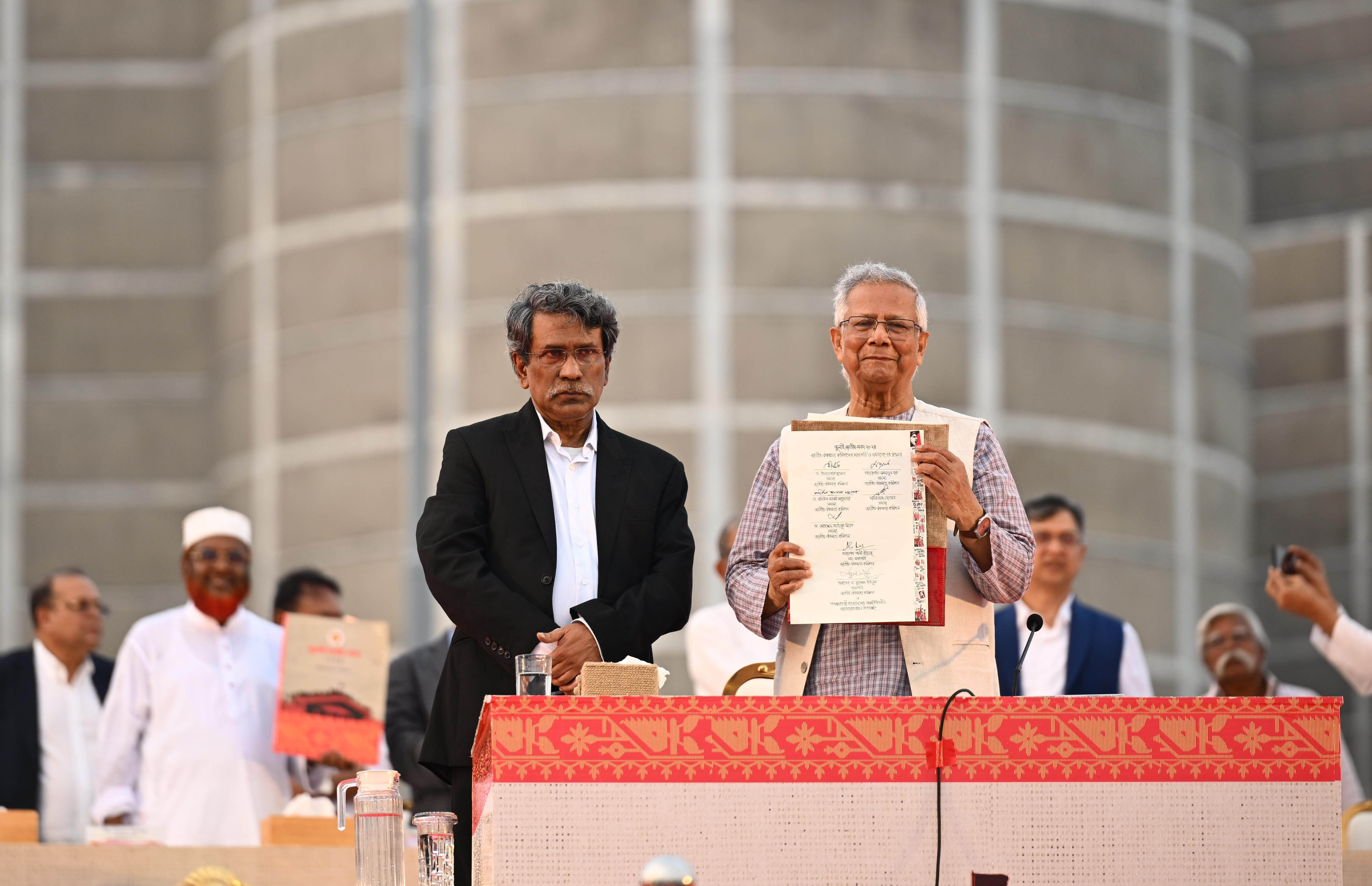
Muhammad Yunus presents the July Charter

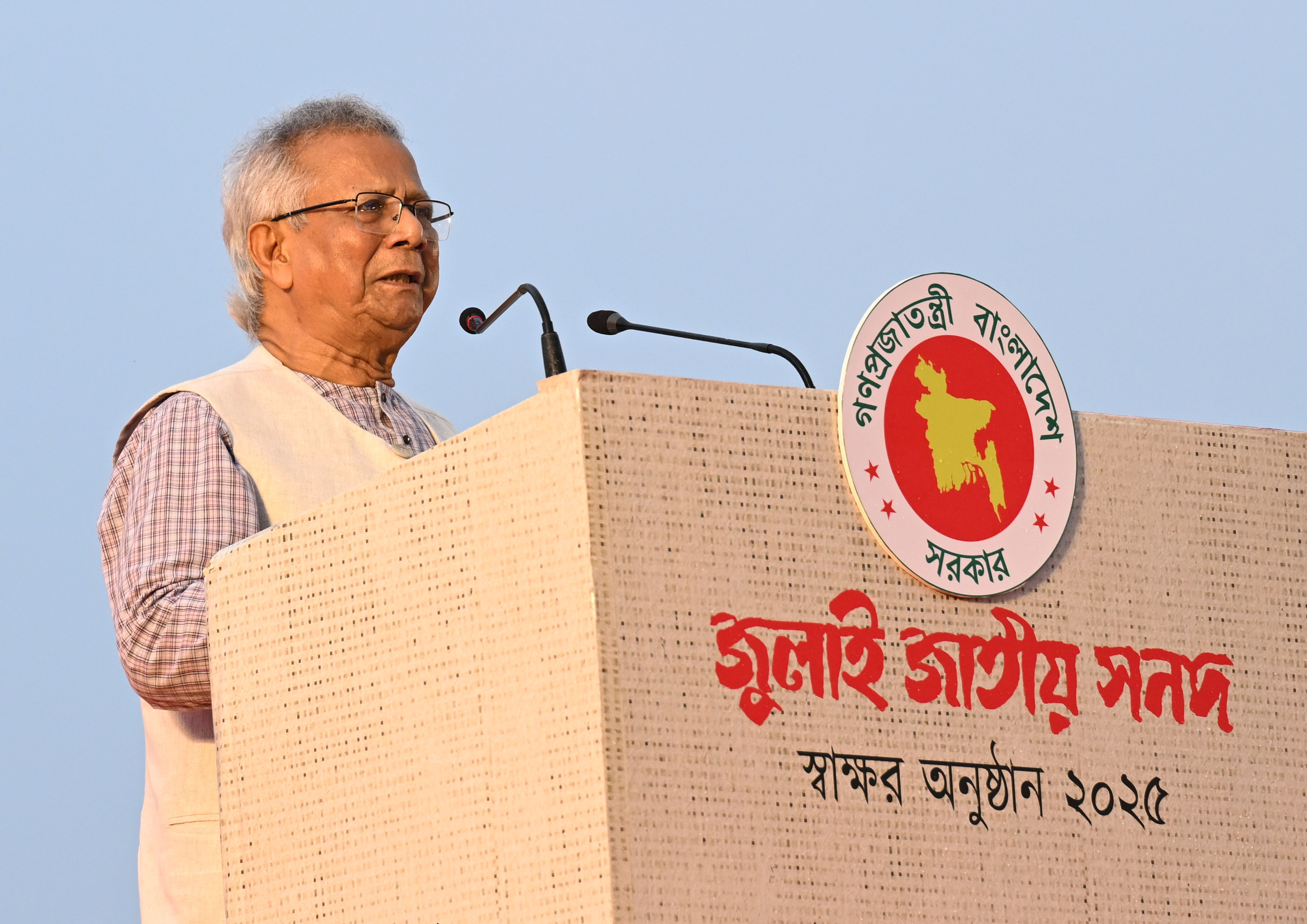
Muhammad Yunus at July Charter signing ceremony

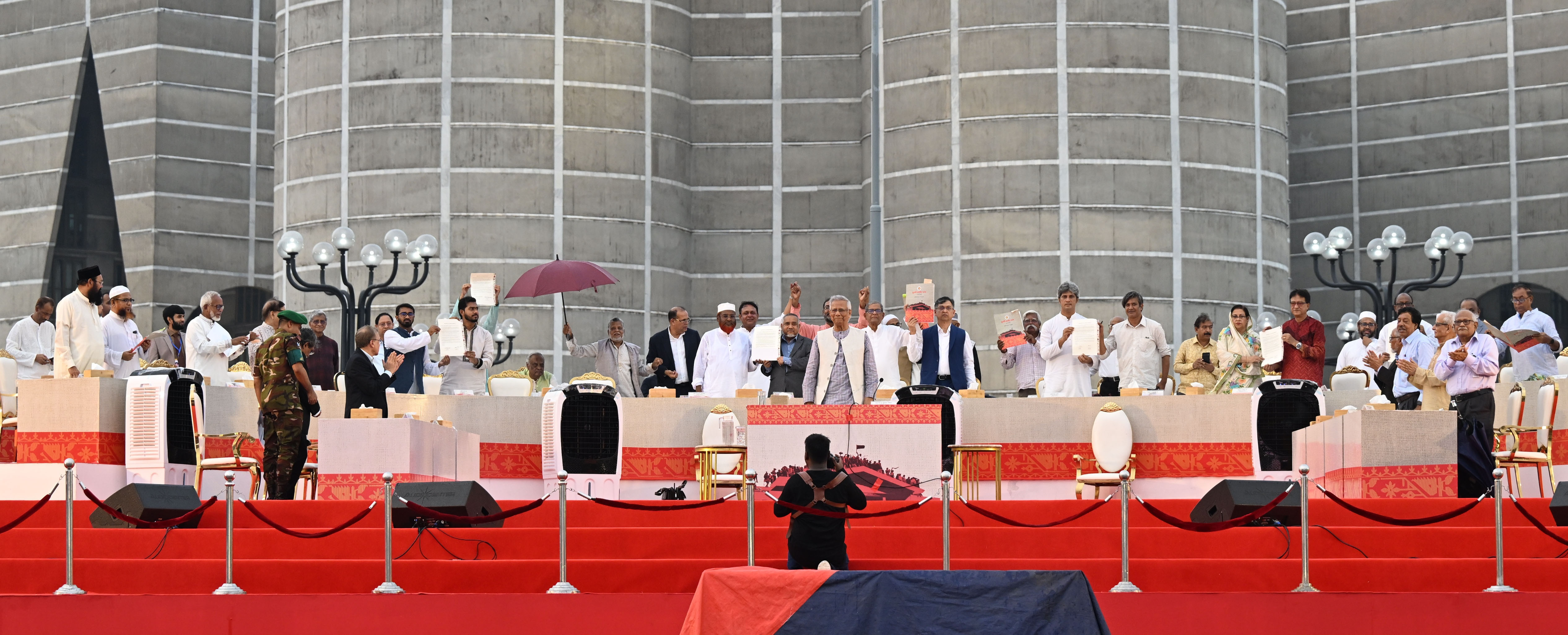
Representatives of political parties signing July Charter

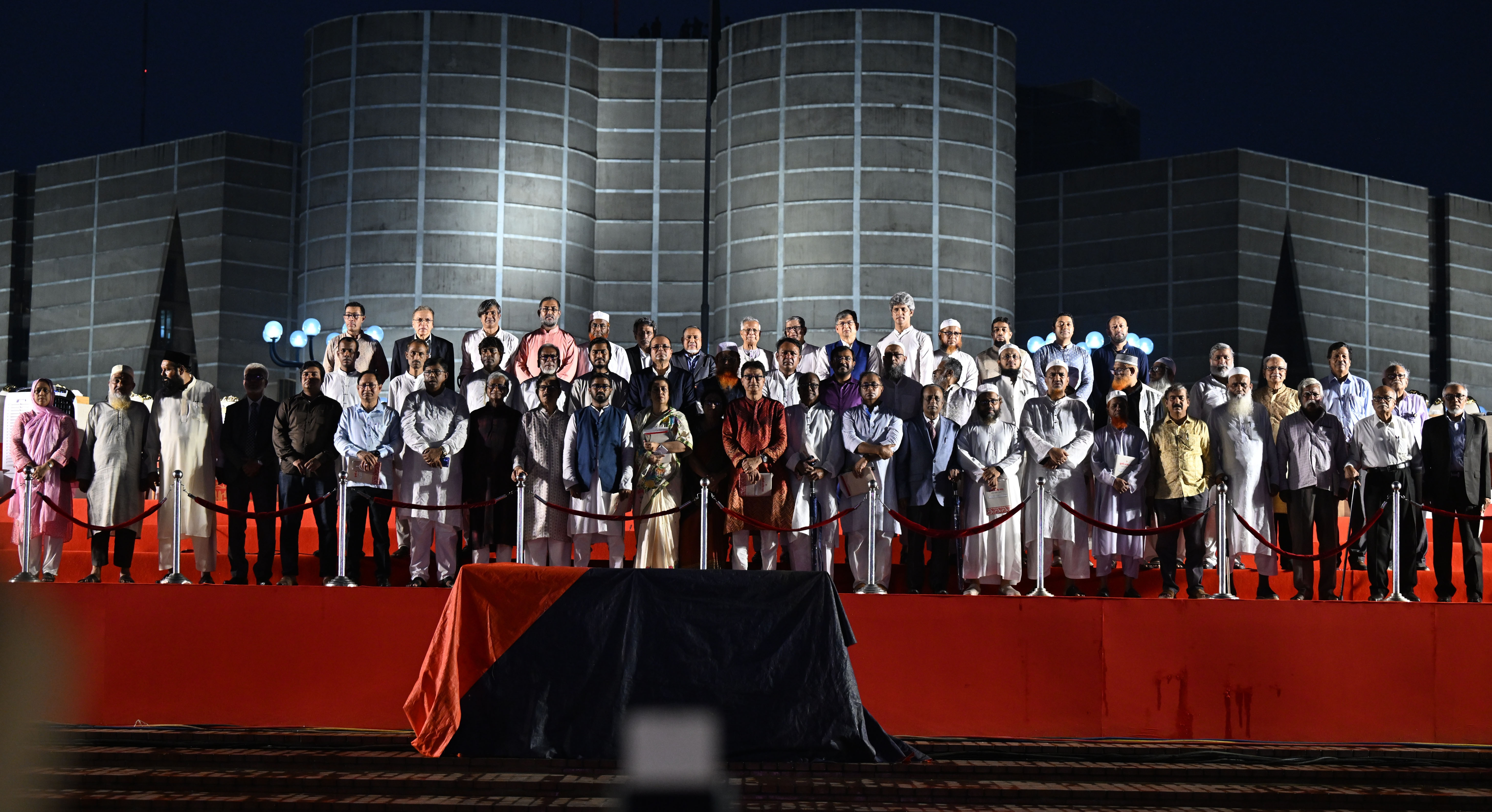
Representatives of political parties at the ceremony

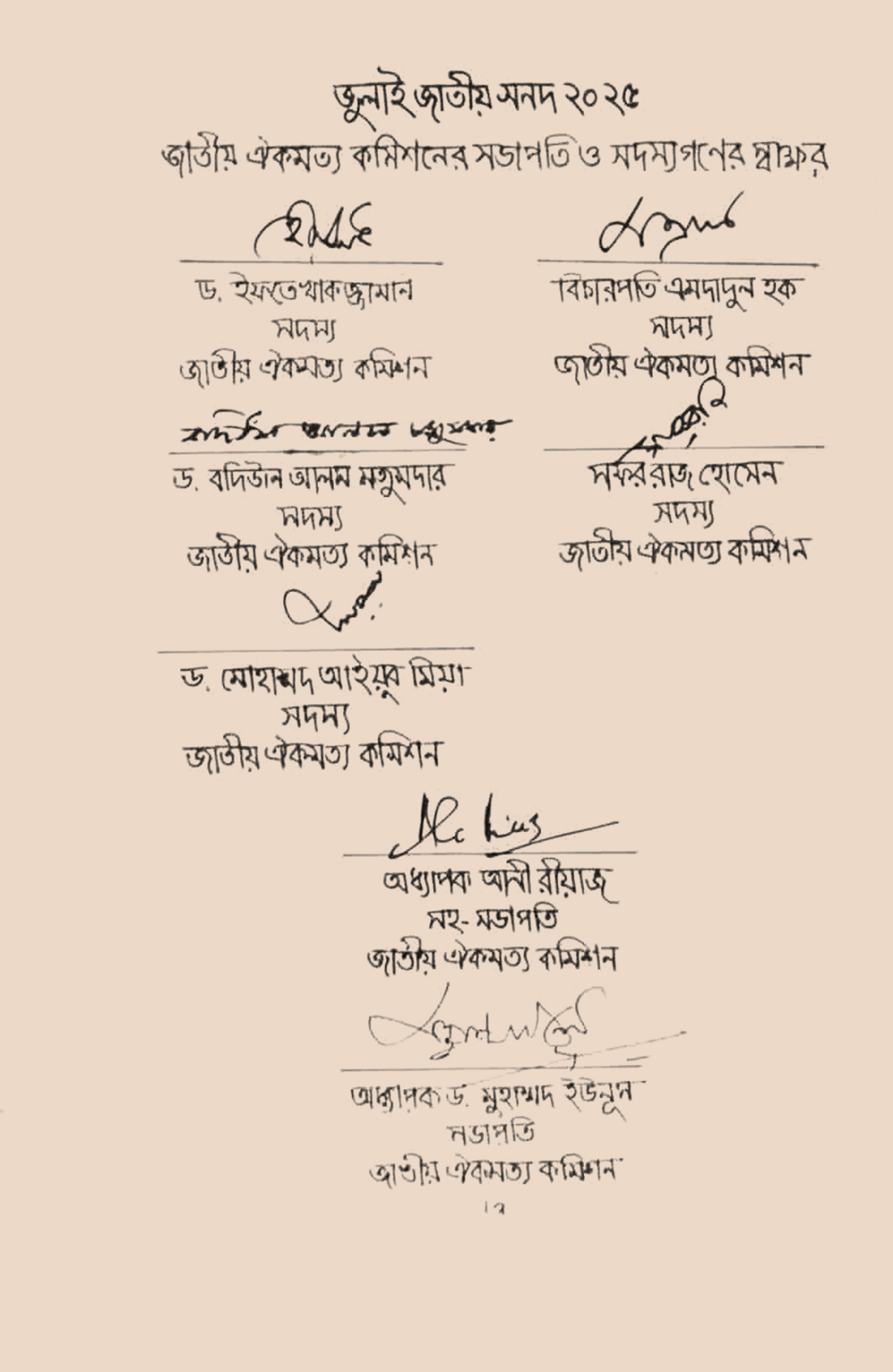
Signatories of July Charter

== See also ==
- Constitution of Bangladesh
