= Ilankai Tamil Arasu Kachchi =

Sri Lankan Tamil nationalist party

Ilankai Tamil Arasu Kachchi Federal Party இலங்கைத் தமிழர்சுக் கட்சி ඉලංගෙයි තමිළ් අරසු කච්චි
- Leader: S. Shritharan
- President: S. Shritharan
- Senior Vice Presidents: P. Selvarasa; S. Sittampalam
- General Secretary: M. A. Sumanthiran
- Treasurer: S. Thiyagarajah
- Founder: S. J. V. Chelvanayakam, C. Vanniasingam, E. M. V. Naganathan
- Founded: 18 December 1949
- Split from: All Ceylon Tamil Congress
- Headquarters: 30 Martin Road, Jaffna
- Ideology: Tamil nationalism
- National affiliation: Tamil National Alliance (2001–2024); Tamil United Liberation Front (1972–2004)
- Colors: Yellow
- Parliament: 8 / 225
- Local Government: 377 / 7,842

Election symbol
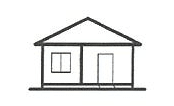

Party flag

Website
- www.itak.lk

Ilankai Tamil Arasu Kachchi (ITAK; lit. 'Sri Lanka Tamil State Party'; Tamil: இலங்கைத் தமிழரசுக் கட்சி, Sinhala: ඉලංගෙයි තමිළ් අරසු කච්චි) is a Sri Lankan political party which represents the Sri Lankan Tamil minority in the country. It was originally founded in 1949 as a breakaway faction of the All Ceylon Tamil Congress (ACTC). In 1972, ITAK merged with the ACTC and Ceylon Workers' Congress (CWC) to form the Tamil United Front, which later changed its name to the Tamil United Liberation Front (TULF). ITAK remained dormant until 2004 when a split in the TULF resulted in ITAK being re-established as an active political party. ITAK was the main constituent party of the Tamil National Alliance from 2004 until its dissolution in 2024. As of 2024, the party is the largest Tamil party in Parliament and the third-largest overall, after the National People's Power and the Samagi Jana Balawegaya.

== History ==
=== Federal Party ===
ITAK was founded in late 1949 by three Ceylon Tamil parliamentarians, S. J. V. Chelvanayakam, C. Vanniasingam and Senator E. M. V. Naganathan, who had withdrawn from G. G. Ponnambalam's ACTC over the latter's decision to enter the United National Party (UNP) government of D. S. Senanayke. ITAK was commonly known as the Federal Party (FP) in English.

Policies adopted by successive Sri Lankan governments, and the 1956 success of the Sinhalese nationalist government under S. W. R. D. Bandaranaike, made the FP the main voice of Sri Lankan Tamil politics. Increased racial and political tension between the country's ethnic groups led three political parties representing the ethnic minorities (FP, ACTC and the CWC) to form the Tamil United Front (TUF) in 1972. The TUF became increasingly nationalistic and by 1976 it had renamed itself as the Tamil United Liberation Front and was advocating an independent Tamil state. The CWC subsequently left the TULF.

The TULF became the first Tamil nationalist party to run on a separatist platform in the 1977 election. It gained a majority of the votes in the north and east, won 18 seats, and became the largest opposition party in parliament. As Tamil nationalism turned violent and civil war broke out, the TULF remained the moderate face of Tamil politics. It became the target of nationalists on both sides and many of its leaders were assassinated.

=== Tamil National Alliance ===
In 2001, the TULF formed a political alliance, the Tamil National Alliance (TNA), with other moderate Tamil parties as well as a number of former militant groups. The TNA contested the 2001 parliamentary election under the TULF name and won 15 seats. Subsequently, the TNA began to make a more pro–Tamil Tiger stance, recognising the Tigers as the sole representative of the Sri Lankan Tamils. This caused a split within the TULF. This meant some members of the TULF, led by its President V. Anandasangaree, were opposed to the Tigers. Anandasangaree refused to allow the TNA to use the TULF's name during the 2004 parliamentary election. This caused the members of TULF who wished to remain with the TNA to resurrect the Illankai Tamil Arasu Kachchi name. ITAK is a registered political party and the TNA has contested all elections since the 2004 parliamentary election under the ITAK name.

== Election results ==
=== 1952 Parliamentary General Election ===
In the first general election contested by ITAK, the 1952 election in which the UNP increased its stranglehold on power, ITAK won 1.9% of the popular vote and 2 out of 95 seats in the Sri Lankan parliament. The ACTC won four seats.

=== 1956 Parliamentary General Election ===
In the 1956 election in which the SLFP-led leftist coalition swept to power, ITAK won 5.39% of the popular vote and 10 out of 95 seats in the Sri Lankan parliament. The ACTC won just one seat. ITAK became the dominant party in the Tamil districts and remained so for two decades.

Votes and seats won by ITAK by electoral district

| Electoral District | Votes | % | Seats | Turnout | ITAK MP |
|---|---|---|---|---|---|
| Batticaloa | 9,300 | 52.05% | 1 | 61.57% | Chelliah Rajadurai |
| Chavakachcheri | 15,952 | 64.77% | 1 | 69.14% | V. N. Navaratnam |
| Jaffna | 7,173 | 32.56% | 0 | 63.72% | |
| Kalkudah | 4,555 | 28.31% | 0 | 60.80% | |
| Kalmunai | 9,464 | 47.80% | 1 | 71.78% | M. S. Kariapper |
| Kankesanthurai | 14,855 | 54.30% | 1 | 67.55% | S. J. V. Chelvanayakam |
| Kayts | 16,308 | 71.19% | 1 | 71.26% | V. A. Kandiah |
| Kopay | 12,804 | 53.83% | 1 | 69.90% | C. Vanniasingam |
| Mannar | 6,726 | 53.12% | 1 | 80.70% | V. A. Alegacone |
| Paddirippu | 9,422 | 49.72% | 0 | 74.17% | |
| Point Pedro | 5,859 | 20.70% | 0 | 64.17% | |
| Pottuvil | 8,355 | 52.46% | 1 | 63.81% | M. M. Mustapha |
| Trincomalee | 7,048 | 56.88% | 1 | 77.36% | N. R. Rajavarothiam |
| Vaddukoddai | 14,937 | 57.92% | 1 | 72.78% | A. Amirthalingam |
| Total | 142,758 | 5.39% | 10 | | |
Source: Department of Elections

ITAK's uncompromising stand on Tamil rights earned it the enmity of nationalist Sinhalese. In response to the Sinhala Only Act of 1956, ITAK MPs staged a satyagraha protest, but it was violently broke up by a Sinhalese mob. ITAK was blamed for the 1958 riots and banned briefly.

Unlike the Left parties, which opposed anything but full parity for the Tamil language, ITAK agreed to compromise and accepted the 1958 the Tamil Language (Special Provisions) Act in accordance with the Bandaranaike–Chelvanayakam Pact.

=== 1960 (March) Parliamentary General Election ===
In the March 1960 election in which the UNP became the largest party, ITAK won 5.80% of the popular vote and 15 out of 151 seats in the Sri Lankan parliament.

Votes and seats won by ITAK by electoral district

| Electoral District | Votes | % | Seats | Turnout | ITAK MP |
|---|---|---|---|---|---|
| Batticaloa | 28,309 | 47.62% | 1 | 159.67% | Chelliah Rajadurai |
| Chavakachcheri | 13,907 | 65.26% | 1 | 83.20% | V. N. Navaratnam |
| Jaffna | 5,101 | 29.35% | 0 | 71.91% | |
| Kalkudah | 7,318 | 48.51% | 1 | 83.46% | P. Manicavasagam |
| Kalmunai | 5,520 | 39.67% | 0 | 79.41% | |
| Kankesanthurai | 13,545 | 67.61% | 1 | 71.22% | S. J. V. Chelvanayakam |
| Kayts | 10,820 | 56.61% | 1 | 75.34% | V. A. Kandiah |
| Kilinochchi | 3,741 | 41.76% | 1 | 64.89% | A. Sivasunderam |
| Kopay | 10,279 | 48.63% | 1 | 77.13% | M. Balasundaram |
| Mannar | 6,463 | 47.37% | 1 | 81.31% | V. A. Alegacone |
| Mutur | 10,685 | 26.73% | 1 | 144.20% | T. Ahambaram |
| Nallur | 9,651 | 49.36% | 1 | 73.12% | E. M. V. Naganathan |
| Paddirippu | 10,799 | 62.36% | 1 | 89.91% | S. M. Rasamanickam |
| Point Pedro | 5,679 | 40.34% | 1 | 73.33% | K. Thurairatnam |
| Trincomalee | 8,872 | 71.43% | 1 | 65.96% | N. R. Rajavarothiam |
| Udupiddy | 3,860 | 18.19% | 0 | 74.84% | |
| Uduvil | 9,033 | 44.07% | 1 | 75.92% | V. Dharmalingam |
| Vaddukoddai | 11,524 | 53.52% | 1 | 75.37% | A. Amirthalingam |
| Vavuniya | 1,338 | 10.78% | 0 | 67.76% | |
| Total | 176,444 | 5.80% | 15 | | |
Source: Department of Elections

=== 1960 (July) Parliamentary General Election ===
In the July 1960 election in which the SLFP became the largest party, ITAK won 7.0% of the popular vote and 16 out of 151 seats in the Sri Lankan parliament.

=== 1965 Parliamentary General Election ===
In the 1965 election in which the UNP became the largest party, ITAK won 5.38% of the popular vote and 14 out of 151 seats in the Sri Lankan parliament.

Votes and seats won by ITAK by electoral district

| Electoral District | Votes | % | Seats | Turnout | ITAK MP |
|---|---|---|---|---|---|
| Batticaloa | 29,023 | 43.47% | 1 | 150.59% | Chelliah Rajadurai |
| Chavakachcheri | 16,316 | 69.41% | 1 | 77.92% | V. N. Navaratnam |
| Jaffna | 6,800 | 30.81% | 0 | 77.76% | |
| Kalkudah | 6,096 | 35.22% | 0 | 72.70% | |
| Kalmunai | 6,235 | 32.69% | 0 | 86.07% | |
| Kankesanthurai | 14,735 | 58.24% | 1 | 72.42% | S. J. V. Chelvanayakam |
| Kayts | 13,558 | 69.98% | 1 | 61.49% | V. Navaratnam |
| Kilinochchi | 5,922 | 44.69% | 1 | 71.33% | K. P. Ratnam |
| Kopay | 12,339 | 51.93% | 1 | 72.90% | S. Kathiravelupillai |
| Mannar | 6,896 | 39.52% | 1 | 82.04% | V. A. Alegacone |
| Mutur | 20,237 | 35.64% | 1 | 150.92% | M. E. H. Mohamed Ali |
| Nallur | 10,301 | 45.05% | 1 | 72.03% | E. M. V. Naganathan |
| Paddirippu | 11,270 | 51.50% | 1 | 85.23% | S. M. Rasamanickam |
| Point Pedro | 7,564 | 46.24% | 1 | 71.62% | K. Thurairatnam |
| Pottuvil | 871 | 4.53% | 0 | 82.26% | |
| Trincomalee | 9,651 | 48.48% | 1 | 73.00% | S. M. Manickarajah |
| Udupiddy | 8,452 | 32.85% | 0 | 75.47% | |
| Uduvil | 11,638 | 48.61% | 1 | 72.80% | V. Dharmalingam |
| Vaddukoddai | 15,498 | 60.78% | 1 | 69.83% | A. Amirthalingam |
| Vavuniya | 4,512 | 25.05% | 0 | 73.45% | |
| Total | 217,914 | 5.38% | 14 | | |
Source: Department of Elections

=== 1970 Parliamentary General Election ===
In the 1970 election in which the SLFP-led United Front coalition won a landslide, ITAK won 4.92% of the popular vote and 13 out of 151 seats in the Sri Lankan parliament.

Votes and seats won by ITAK by electoral district

| Electoral District | Votes | % | Seats | Turnout | ITAK MP |
|---|---|---|---|---|---|
| Batticaloa | 27,661 | 33.17% | 1 | 164.35% | Chelliah Rajadurai |
| Chavakachcheri | 15,473 | 54.49% | 1 | 86.11% | V. N. Navaratnam |
| Jaffna | 8,848 | 35.59% | 1 | 79.89% | C. X. Martyn |
| Kalkudah | 8,420 | 37.97% | 0 | 83.59% | |
| Kalmunai | 4,960 | 23.00% | 0 | 87.77% | |
| Kankesanthurai | 13,520 | 44.29% | 1 | 81.03% | S. J. V. Chelvanayakam |
| Kayts | 13,079 | 53.35% | 1 | 76.88% | K. P. Ratnam |
| Kilinochchi | 8,392 | 46.55% | 0 | 76.03% | |
| Kopay | 16,428 | 43.92% | 1 | 79.01% | S. Kathiravelupillai |
| Mannar | 10,697 | 48.98% | 1 | 86.34% | V. A. Alegacone |
| Mutur | 19,787 | 25.87% | 1 | 174.73% | A. Thangathurai |
| Nallur | 12,508 | 44.61% | 0 | 78.69% | |
| Paddirippu | 12,723 | 48.76% | 0 | 90.45% | |
| Point Pedro | 9,217 | 48.50% | 1 | 79.52% | K. Thurairatnam |
| Trincomalee | 12,395 | 45.83% | 1 | 76.61% | B. Neminathan |
| Udupiddy | 12,918 | 46.54% | 1 | 80.41% | Kandappa Jeyakody |
| Uduvil | 14,120 | 49.27% | 1 | 78.43% | V. Dharmalingam |
| Vaddukoddai | 13,634 | 48.71% | 0 | 78.67% | |
| Vavuniya | 10,947 | 42.99% | 1 | 80.82% | X. M. Sellathambu |
| Total | 245,727 | 4.92% | 13 | | |
Source: Department of Elections

=== 1977 Parliamentary General Election ===
In the first general election contested by the TULF, the 21 July 1977 election in which the UNP won by a landslide, the TULF won 6.40% of the popular vote and 18 out of 168 seats in the Sri Lankan parliament, including all 14 seats in the Northern Province.

Votes and seats won by TULF by electoral district

| Electoral District | Votes | % | Seats | Turnout | TULF MP |
|---|---|---|---|---|---|
| Batticaloa | 26,648 | 24.70% | 1 | 171.15% | Chelliah Rajadurai |
| Chavakachcheri | 20,028 | 63.27% | 1 | 85.65% | V. N. Navaratnam |
| Jaffna | 16,251 | 56.62% | 1 | 82.32% | V. Yogeswaran |
| Kalkudah | 12,595 | 43.07% | 0 | 86.02% | |
| Kalmunai | 7,093 | 27.38% | 0 | 89.86% | |
| Kankesanthurai | 31,155 | 85.41% | 1 | 83.08% | A. Amirthalingam |
| Kayts | 17,640 | 64.05% | 1 | 75.72% | K. P. Ratnam |
| Kilinochchi | 15,607 | 73.42% | 1 | 79.71% | V. Anandasangaree |
| Kopay | 25,840 | 77.20% | 1 | 80.03% | S. Kathiravelupillai |
| Manipay | 27,550 | 83.99% | 1 | 79.28% | V. Dharmalingam |
| Mannar | 15,141 | 51.58% | 1 | 92.40% | P. S. Soosaithasan |
| Mullaitivu | 10,261 | 52.36% | 1 | 79.34% | X. M. Sellathambu |
| Mutur | 7,520 | 27.00% | 0 | 91.65% | |
| Nallur | 29,858 | 89.42% | 1 | 83.05% | M. Sivasithamparam |
| Paddirippu | 15,877 | 49.17% | 1 | 89.92% | P. Ganeshalingam |
| Point Pedro | 12,989 | 55.91% | 1 | 81.66% | K. Thurairatnam |
| Pottuvil | 23,990 | 26.97% | 1 | 179.02% | M. Kanagaratnam |
| Puttalam | 3,268 | 10.52% | 0 | 83.58% | |
| Sammanthurai | 8,615 | 34.65% | 0 | 91.04% | |
| Trincomalee | 15,144 | 51.76% | 1 | 81.78% | R. Sampanthan |
| Udupiddy | 18,768 | 63.44% | 1 | 80.05% | T. Rasalingam |
| Vaddukoddai | 23,384 | 70.18% | 1 | 81.90% | T. Thirunavukarasu |
| Vavuniya | 13,821 | 59.02% | 1 | 82.31% | T. Sivasithamparam |
| Total | 399,043 | 6.40% | 18 | | |

The TULF became the official opposition as result of the rout of the SLFP. The TULF's success would lead to riots in which hundreds of Tamils were murdered by Sinhalese mobs.

Throughout the 1970s and early 1980s, the TULF was frequently blamed by nationalist Sinhalese politicians for acts of violence committed by militant groups such as the Liberation Tigers of Tamil Eelam (LTTE). In fact, the TULF represented an older, more conservative generation of Tamils that felt independence could be achieved without violence, more rival than ally to youth groups like the LTTE who believed in armed conflict.

In October 1983, all the TULF legislators, numbering sixteen at the time, forfeited their seats in Parliament for refusing to swear an oath unconditionally renouncing support for a separate state in accordance with the Sixth Amendment to the Constitution of Sri Lanka.

During the 1980s, the LTTE began to see the TULF as a rival in its desire to be considered the sole representatives of the Tamils of the north and east. Over the next two decades, the LTTE assassinated several TULF leaders, including A. Amirthalingam and Neelan Thiruchelvam.

=== 1989 Parliamentary General Election ===
The TULF formed an alliance with the three Indian backed paramilitary groups, Eelam National Democratic Liberation Front (ENDLF), Eelam People's Revolutionary Liberation Front (EPRLF) and Tamil Eelam Liberation Organization (TELO), to contest the 15 February 1989 election. The alliance won 3.40% of the popular vote and 10 out of 225 seats in the Sri Lankan parliament.

Votes and seats won by TULF / ENDLF / EPRLF / TULF alliance by electoral district

| Electoral District | Votes | % | Seats | Turnout | TULF / ENDLF / EPRLF / TELO MPs |
|---|---|---|---|---|---|
| Batticaloa | 55,131 | 35.49% | 3 | 71.74% | Prince Gunarasa Casinader (EPRLF); Govinthan Karunakaram (TELO); Samuel Pennington Thavarasa Tambimuttu (EPRLF), murdered 11 May 1990; Joseph Pararajasingham (TULF), from 1990 (replaces Sam Tambimuttu (EPRLF)) |
| Digamadulla | 43,424 | 20.32% | 1 | 80.41% | Jeyaratnam Thiviya Nadan (EPRLF) |
| Jaffna | 60,013 | 25.02% | 3 | 40.50% | Kandiah Navaratnam (EPRLF); Suresh Premachandran (EPRLF); Ganeshankari Yogasangari (EPRLF), murdered 19 June 1990 |
| Vanni | 17,271 | 39.99% | 2 | 30.53% | Raja Kuhaneswaran (TELO); Anthony Emmanuel Silva (EPRLF) |
| National List | | | 1 | | A. Amirthalingam (TULF), murdered 13 July 1989; Mavai Senathirajah (replaces A. Amirthalingam) |
| Total | 188,593 | 3.40% | 10 | 63.6% | |

=== 1994 Parliamentary General Election ===
In the 16 August 1994 election in which the People's Alliance led by Chandrika Kumaratunga came to power after 17 years of UNP rule, the TULF won 1.60% of the popular vote and 5 out of 225 seats in the Sri Lankan parliament.

Votes and seats won by TULF by electoral district

| Electoral District | Votes | % | Seats | Turnout | TULF MPs |
|---|---|---|---|---|---|
| Batticaloa | 76,516 | 43.95% | 3 | 66.47% | Joseph Pararajasingham; P. Selvarasa; K. Thurairasasingham |
| Trincomalee | 28,380 | 23.66% | 1 | 65.15% | A. Thangathurai |
| National List | | | 1 | | Neelan Tiruchelvam, murdered 29 July 1999; Mavai Senathirajah, from August 1999 (replaces Neelan Tiruchelvam) |
| Total | 132,461 | 1.60% | 5 | 76.23% | |

=== 2000 Parliamentary General Election ===
In the 10 October 2000 election in which the People's Alliance led by Ratnasiri Wickremanayake retained to power, the TULF won 1.23% of the popular vote and 5 out of 225 seats in the Sri Lankan parliament.

Votes and seats won by TULF by electoral district

| Electoral District | Votes | % | Seats | Turnout | TULF MPs |
|---|---|---|---|---|---|
| Batticaloa | 54,448 | 29.20% | 2 | 71.74% | Joseph Pararajasingham; Nimalan Soundaranayagam |
| Jaffna | 32,852 | 27.59% | 3 | 21.32% | V. Anandasangaree; Mavai Senathirajah; Sinnathamby Sivamaharajah |
| Trincomalee | 14,090 | 10.58% | 0 | 68.52% | |
| Vanni | 4,643 | 5.58% | 0 | 42.13% | |
| National List | | | 0 | | |
| Total | 106,033 | 1.23% | 5 | 75.62% | |

=== 2001 Parliamentary General Election ===
In the first parliamentary election contested by the Tamil National Alliance, the 5 December 2001 election, the TNA led by Rajavarothiam Sampanthan won 3.88% of the popular vote and 15 out of 225 seats in the Sri Lankan parliament.

Votes and seats won by TNA by electoral district

| Electoral District | Votes | % | Seats | Turnout | TNA MPs |
|---|---|---|---|---|---|
| Ampara | 48,789 | 17.41% | 1 | 82.51% | A. Chandranehru (TULF) |
| Batticaloa | 86,284 | 48.17% | 3 | 68.20% | G. Krishnapillai (ACTC); Joseph Pararajasingham (TULF); Thambiraja Thangavadivel (TELO) |
| Colombo | 12,696 | 1.20% | 0 | 76.31% | |
| Jaffna | 102,324 | 54.84% | 6 | 31.14% | V. Anandasangaree (TULF); Gajendrakumar Ponnambalam (ACTC); Nadarajah Raviraj (TULF); Mavai Senathirajah (TULF); M. K. Shivajilingam (TELO); A. Vinayagamoorthy (ACTC) |
| Trincomalee | 56,121 | 34.83% | 1 | 79.88% | R. Sampanthan (TULF) |
| Vanni | 41,950 | 44.39% | 3 | 46.77% | Selvam Adaikalanathan (TELO); Sivasakthy Ananthan (EPRLF); Irasa Kuhaneswaran (TELO) |
| National List | | | 1 | | M. Sivasithamparam (TULF), died 5 June 2002; K. Thurairetnasingam (TULF) (replaces M. Sivasithamparam) |
| Total | 348,164 | 3.88% | 15 | 76.03% | |
Source:"Parliamentary General Election 2001, Final District Results". Department of Elections, Sri Lanka.

=== 2004 Parliamentary General Election ===
In the 2 April 2004 parliamentary election in which the United People's Freedom Alliance led by President Kumaratunga came to power, the Tamil National Alliance led by Rajavarothiam Sampanthan won 6.84% of the popular vote and 22 out of 225 seats in the Sri Lankan parliament.

Votes and seats won by TNA by electoral district

| Electoral District | Votes | % | Seats | Turnout | TNA MPs |
|---|---|---|---|---|---|
| Ampara | 55,533 | 19.13% | 1 | 81.42% | K. Pathmanathan, died 21 May 2009; Thomas Thangathurai William, from 12 June 2009 (replaces K. Pathmanathan) |
| Batticaloa | 161,011 | 66.71% | 4 | 83.58% | Senathirajah Jeyanandamoorthy; Thanmanpillai Kanagasabai; Thangeswary Kathiraman; Kingsley Rasanayagam, resigned April 2004; P. Ariyanethiran, from 18 May 2004 (replaces Kingsley Rasanayagam) |
| Jaffna | 257,320 | 90.60% | 8 | 47.38% | Selvarajah Kajendren; Gajendrakumar Ponnambalam (ACTC); Suresh Premachandran (EPRLF); Nadarajah Raviraj (ITAK), murdered 10 November 2006; Mavai Senathirajah (ITAK); M. K. Shivajilingam (TELO); K. Sivanesan, murdered 6 March 2008; Pathmini Sithamparanathan; Nallathamby Srikantha (TELO), from 30 November 2006 (replaces Nadarajah Raviraj); Solomon Cyril, from 9 April 2008 (replaces Kidnan Sivanesan) |
| Trincomalee | 68,955 | 37.72% | 2 | 85.44% | R. Sampanthan (ITAK); K. Thurairetnasingam (ITAK) |
| Vanni | 90,835 | 64.71% | 5 | 66.64% | Selvam Adaikalanathan (TELO); Sivasakthy Ananthan (EPRLF); Sathasivam Kanagaratnam; Sivanathan Kisshor; Vino Noharathalingam (TELO) |
| National List | | | 2 | | M. K. Eelaventhan, expelled from Parliament 14 December 2007 for non-attendance Joseph Pararajasingham (ITAK), murdered 24 December 2005; Chandra Nehru Chandrakanthan, from 27 September 2006 (replaces Joseph Pararajasingham); Raseen Mohammed Imam, from 5 February 2008 (replaces M. K. Eelaventhan) |
| Total | 633,654 | 6.84% | 22 | 75.96% | |
Source:"Parliamentary General Election 2004, Final District Results". Department of Elections, Sri Lanka.

=== 2010 Parliamentary General Election ===
In the 2010 Sri Lankan parliamentary election, in which the United People's Freedom Alliance , led by Mahinda Rajapaksa, retained power, the Tamil National Alliance, led by Rajavarothiam Sampanthan, won 2.9% of the popular vote and 14 out of 225 seats in the Sri Lankan parliament.

Votes and seats won by the TNA by electoral district

| Electoral District | Votes | % | Seats | Turnout | TNA MPs |
|---|---|---|---|---|---|
| Ampara | 26,895 | 10.47% | 1 | 64.74% | Podiappuhamy Piyasena |
| Batticaloa | 66,235 | 36.67% | 3 | 58.56% | P. Ariyanethiran (ITAK); P. Selvarasa (ITAK); S. Yogeswaran (ITAK) |
| Jaffna | 65,119 | 43.85% | 5 | 23.33% | Suresh Premachandran (EPRLF); E. Saravanapavan (ITAK); Mavai Senathirajah (ITAK); S. Sritharan (ITAK); A. Vinayagamoorthy |
| Trincomalee | 33,268 | 23.81% | 1 | 62.20% | R. Sampanthan (ITAK) |
| Vanni | 41,673 | 38.96% | 3 | 43.89% | Selvam Adaikalanathan (TELO); Sivasakthy Ananthan (EPRLF); Vino Noharathalingam (TELO) |
| National List | | | 1 | | M. A. Sumanthiran (ITAK) |
| Total | 233,190 | 2.90% | 14 | 61.26% | |
Source:"Parliamentary General Election – 2010". Department of Elections, Sri Lanka.

=== 2024 parliamentary election ===
| Election | Leader | Votes | | Seats | | | Result | Ref |
| Election | Leader | No. | % | No. | +/– | % | Result | Ref |
|---|---|---|---|---|---|---|---|---|
| 2024 | S. Shritharan | 257,813 | 2.37% | 8 / 225 | ▲8 | 24.00% | Opposition | |
