= K. Thurairetnasingam =

Sri Lankan politician (1941–2021)

Hon. K. Thurairetnasingam MP
- கே. துரைரத்தினசிங்கம்

Member of Parliament for National List
- In office 2015–2020
- In office 2002–2004
- Preceded by: M. Sivasithamparam

Member of Parliament for Trincomalee District
- In office 2004–2010

Personal details
- Born: 4 January 1941
- Died: 17 May 2021 (aged 80)
- Party: Illankai Tamil Arasu Kachchi
- Other political affiliations: Tamil National Alliance
- Occupation: Civil servant
- Ethnicity: Sri Lankan Tamil

Kathirgamathamby Thurairetnasingam (Tamil: கதிர்காமத்தம்பி துரைரத்தினசிங்கம்; 4 January 1941 – 17 May 2021) was a Sri Lankan Tamil civil servant, politician and Member of Parliament.

== Early life ==
Thurairetnasingam was born on 4 January 1941.

== Career ==
Thurairetnasingam was a Divisional Director of Education.

Thurairetnasingam was one of the Tamil National Alliance's (TNA) candidates in Trincomalee District at the 2001 parliamentary election but failed to get elected after coming second amongst the TNA candidates. However, in June 2002 he entered Parliament when he was appointed a National List Member of Parliament for the TNA, replacing M. Sivasithamparam who had died on 5 June 2002. He was one of the TNA's candidates in Trincomalee District at the 2004 parliamentary election. He was elected and re-entered Parliament. Thurairetnasingam did not contest the 2010 parliamentary election for personal reasons.

Thurairetnasingam was one of the TNA's candidates in Trincomalee District at the 2015 parliamentary election but failed to get elected after coming second amongst the TNA candidates. However, after the election he was appointed a TNA National List MP in Parliament.

== Death ==
Thurairetnasingam died from COVID-19 on 17 May 2021, aged 80.

== Electoral history ==
Electoral history of K. Thurairetnasingam
Election	Constituency	Party	Votes	Result
2001 parliamentary	Trincomalee District	TNA		Not elected
2004 parliamentary	Trincomalee District	TNA	34,773	Elected
2015 parliamentary	Trincomalee District	TNA	14,779	Not elected
