= Gajendrakumar Ponnambalam =

Sri Lankan lawyer, politician and Member of Parliament

Hon. Gajendrakumar Ponnambalam MP
- கஜேந்திரகுமார் பொன்னம்பலம் ජේන්ද්‍රකුමාර් කැන්ගසර් පොන්නම්බලම්
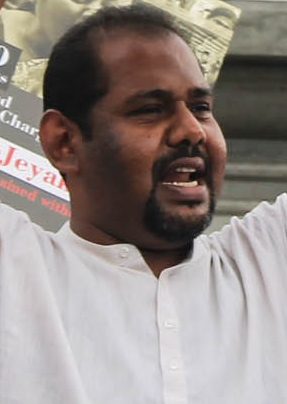
- Ponnambalam in September 2014

Member of the Parliament of Sri Lanka
- Incumbent
- Assumed office 2020
- Constituency: Jaffna District
- In office 2001–2010
- Constituency: Jaffna District

Personal details
- Born: Gajendrakumar Gangaser Ponnambalam; 16 January 1974 (age 52)
- Party: All Ceylon Tamil Congress
- Other political affiliations: Tamil National People's Front
- Education: SOAS, University of London
- Profession: Lawyer

Gajendrakumar Gangaser Ponnambalam (Tamil: கஜேந்திரகுமார் காங்கேசர் பொன்னம்பலம், romanized: Kajēntirakumār Kāṅkēcar Poṉṉampalam; born 16 January 1974) is a Sri Lankan lawyer, politician and Member of Parliament. He is the leader of the All Ceylon Tamil Congress, a member of the Tamil National People's Front.

== Early life and family ==
Ponnambalam was born on 16 January 1974. He is the son of Kumar Ponnambalam and grandson of G. G. Ponnambalam, both leaders of the All Ceylon Tamil Congress (ACTC). He was educated at Royal College, Colombo and the Colombo International School. After school he joined SOAS, University of London, graduating with a LL.B. degree in 1995.

== Career ==
Ponnambalam qualified as a barrister-at-law from Lincoln's Inn and was called to the bar of England and Wales in 1997. Returning to Sri Lanka, he qualified as an attorney-at-law and was called to the bar of Sri Lanka in 1999.

Ponnambalam entered politics following the assassination of his father on 5 January 2000. On 20 October 2001 the ACTC, Eelam People's Revolutionary Liberation Front, Tamil Eelam Liberation Organization and Tamil United Liberation Front formed the Tamil National Alliance (TNA). Ponnambalam contested the 2001 parliamentary election as one of the TNA's candidates in Jaffna District and was elected to the Parliament. He was re-elected at the 2004 parliamentary election. In March 2010 Ponnambalam, along with fellow TNA MPs S. Kajendran and Pathmini Sithamparanathan, left the TNA and formed the Tamil National People's Front (TNPF).

Ponnambalam contested the 2010 parliamentary election as a TNPF candidate in Jaffna District but the TNPF failed to win any seats in Parliament. In February 2011 Ponnambalam became one of the vice-presidents of the TNPF. He contested the 2015 parliamentary election as a TNPF candidates in Jaffna District but, again, the TNPF failed to win any seats in Parliament.

Ponnambalam contested the 2020 parliamentary election as a TNPF candidate in Jaffna District and was re-elected to the Parliament of Sri Lanka.

Ponnambalam has extensive shareholdings in several companies listed on the Colombo Stock Exchange - either directly or through family owned companies Gee Gees Properties (Pvt) Ltd and Gitanjali Gajaluckshmi (Pvt) Ltd - including Serendib Land PLC (property developer), LOLC Holdings PLC/Lanka ORIX Leasing Company (leasing, factoring and microfinance) and Bukit Darah PLC (palm oil).

== Electoral history ==
Electoral history of Gajendrakumar Ponnambalam
Election	Constituency	Party	Alliance	Votes	Result
2001 parliamentary	Jaffna District	All Ceylon Tamil Congress	Tamil National Alliance	29,641	Elected
2004 parliamentary	Jaffna District	All Ceylon Tamil Congress	Tamil National Alliance	60,770	Elected
2010 parliamentary	Jaffna District	All Ceylon Tamil Congress	Tamil National People's Front		Not elected
2015 parliamentary	Jaffna District	All Ceylon Tamil Congress	Tamil National People's Front		Not elected
2020 parliamentary	Jaffna District	All Ceylon Tamil Congress	Tamil National People's Front	31,658	Elected
2024 parliamentary	Jaffna District	All Ceylon Tamil Congress	Tamil National People's Front	15,135	Elected

== See also ==
- List of political families in Sri Lanka
