= Sivasakthy Ananthan =

Sri Lankan Tamil politician and Member of Parliament

Hon. Sivasakthy Ananthan MP
- சிவசக்தி ஆனந்தன் සිවශක්ති ආනන්දන්

Member of Parliament for Vanni District
- In office 2001–2020

Personal details
- Born: 29 July 1964 (age 61)
- Party: Eelam People's Revolutionary Liberation Front
- Other political affiliations: Tamil National Alliance

Annamalai Nadesu Sivasakthy Ananthan (born 29 July 1964) is a Sri Lankan Tamil politician and Member of Parliament.

== Early life ==
Ananthan was born on 29 July 1964.

== Career ==
Ananthan is a member of the Eelam People's Revolutionary Liberation Front (EPRLF). On 20 October 2001 the All Ceylon Tamil Congress, EPRLF, Tamil Eelam Liberation Organization and Tamil United Liberation Front formed the Tamil National Alliance (TNA). Ananthan contested the 2001 parliamentary election as one of the TNA's candidates in Vanni District. He was elected and entered Parliament. He was re-elected at the 2004, 2010 and 2015 parliamentary elections.

== Electoral history ==
Electoral history of Sivasakthy Ananthan
Election	Constituency	Party	Votes	Result
2001 parliamentary	Vanni District	TNA	14,023	Elected
2004 parliamentary	Vanni District	TNA	29,801	Elected
2010 parliamentary	Vanni District	TNA	11,674	Elected
2015 parliamentary	Vanni District	TNA	25,027	Elected
