= S. Kajendran =

Sri Lankan Tamil politician

Honourable S. Kajendran MP
- செல்வராசா கஜேந்திரன் සෙල්වරාසා ගජේන්ද්‍රන්
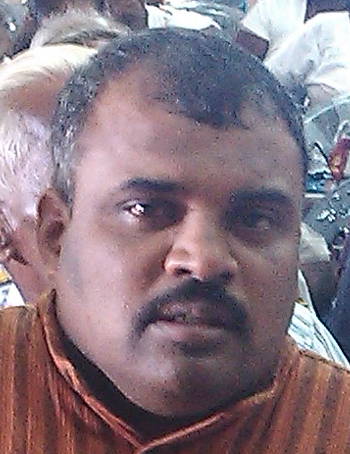

Member of Parliament for National List
- Incumbent
- Assumed office 20 August 2020

Member of Parliament for Jaffna District
- In office 2004–2010

Personal details
- Born: 29 October 1974 (age 51)
- Party: Tamil National People's Front

Selvarajah Kajendran (Tamil: செல்வராசா கஜேந்திரன்; born 29 October 1974) is a Sri Lankan Tamil politician and a Member of Parliament of Sri Lanka.

== Early life ==
Kajendran was born on 29 October 1974. He was president of the Jaffna University Student Union in 2001/02.

== Career ==
Kajendran was selected by the militant Liberation Tigers of Tamil Eelam (LTTE) to be one of the Tamil National Alliance's (TNA) candidates in Jaffna District at the 2004 parliamentary election. He was elected and entered Parliament. In March 2010 Kajendran, along with fellow TNA MPs Gajendrakumar Ponnambalam and Pathmini Sithamparanathan, left the TNA and formed the Tamil National People's Front (TNPF).

Kajendran contested the 2010 parliamentary election as one of the TNPF's candidates in Jaffna District but the TNPF failed to win any seats in Parliament. In February 2011 Kajendran became general secretary of the TNPF. He contested the 2015 parliamentary election as one of the TNPF's candidates in Jaffna District but again the TNPF failed to win any seats in Parliament.

== Electoral history ==
Electoral history of S. Kajendran
Election	Constituency	Party	Votes	Result
2004 parliamentary	Jaffna District	TNA	112,077	Elected
2010 parliamentary	Jaffna District	TNPF		Not elected
2015 parliamentary	Jaffna District	TNPF		Not elected
2020 parliamentary	Jaffna District	TNPF		Not elected
