= S. Shritharan =

Sri Lankan Tamil politician

Hon. S. Shritharan MP
- சி. சிறீதரன் සිවඥානම් ශ්රීධරන්

Member of the Parliament of Sri Lanka
- Incumbent
- Assumed office 2010
- Constituency: Jaffna District

Personal details
- Born: Sivagnanam Shritharan; 8 December 1968 (age 57)
- Party: Ilankai Tamil Arasu Kachchi
- Other political affiliations: Tamil National Alliance
- Education: University of Jaffna
- Profession: Teacher
- Website: www.shritharan.com

Sivagnanam Shritharan (Tamil: சிவஞானம் சிறீதரன், romanized: Civañāṉam Ciṟītaraṉ; born 8 December 1968) is a Sri Lankan Tamil teacher, politician and Member of Parliament. He is the current leader of the Ilankai Tamil Arasu Kachchi, the largest Tamil nationalist party in the Sri Lankan Parliament.

== Early life and family ==
Shritharan was born on 8 December 1968. He is from Kandavalai in Kilinochchi District though he is originally from the island of Neduntivu (Delft) in Jaffna District. He was educated at Jaffna Hindu College. After school, he joined the University of Jaffna.

Shritharan is married to the sister of Brigadier Theepan (Velayuthapillai Baheerathakumarn) who was a senior military commander in the Liberation Tigers of Tamil Eelam.

== Career ==
Shritharan taught at several schools in Kilinochchi District and was the principal of Kilinochchi Maha Vidyalayam.

Shritharan contested the 2010 parliamentary election as one of the Tamil National Alliance electoral alliance's candidates in Jaffna District and was elected to the Parliament. He was re-elected at the 2015 and 2020 parliamentary elections.

Following the announcement of the retirement of ITAK party leader Mavai Senathirajah, Shritharan applied for the leadership position in December 2023. He was the favored candidate since he was based in Jaffna and was elected leader of the ITAK on 21 January 2024 defeating M. A. Sumanthiran and S. Yogeswaran; having gained 184 votes to Sumanthiran's 134. Following the appointment, he paid respects at the Kanagapuram Thuyilum Illam (cemetery for fallen Tamil Tigers).

== Assassination attempt ==
On 7 March 2011, Shritharan was traveling in a van from Kilinochchi to Colombo to attend a meeting of Parliament the following day. Traveling with Sritharan in the van were four others including a police guard. At around 5.30pm the van was on the A12 highway near Nochchiyagama, Anuradhapura District, when three men standing by a white van parked on the roadside pulled out guns and started shooting at Shritharan's van. The men also threw hand grenades at the van. Sritharan's police guard fired back, forcing the attackers to flee in their white van which had no number plates. No one was seriously injured in the incident. Shritharan has blamed the Eelam People's Democratic Party, a government backed paramilitary group, for the assassination attempt. The EPDP has been implicated in a number of assassinations. Speaker Chamal Rajapaksa ordered an investigation into the assassination attempt.

== Electoral history ==
Electoral history of S. Shritharan
Election	Constituency	Party	Alliance	Votes	Result
2010 parliamentary	Jaffna District	Illankai Tamil Arasu Kachchi	Tamil National Alliance	10,057	Elected
2015 parliamentary	Jaffna District	Illankai Tamil Arasu Kachchi	Tamil National Alliance	72,058	Elected
2020 parliamentary	Jaffna District	Illankai Tamil Arasu Kachchi	Tamil National Alliance	35,884	Elected
2024 parliamentary	Jaffna District	Illankai Tamil Arasu Kachchi	-	32,833	Elected
