= Suresh Premachandran =

Sri Lankan politician (born 1957)

Hon. Suresh Premachandran MP
- சுரேஷ் பிரேமச்சந்திரன்
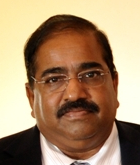

Member of Parliament for Jaffna District
- In office 1989–1994
- In office 2004–2015

Personal details
- Born: 8 November 1957 (age 68) Jaffna, Dominion of Ceylon
- Party: Eelam People's Revolutionary Liberation Front
- Other political affiliations: Tamil National Alliance

Arumugam Kandaiah Premachandran (Tamil: ஆறுமுகம் கந்தையா பிரேமச்சந்திரன்; born 8 November 1957; commonly known as Suresh Premachandran) is a Sri Lankan Tamil militant turned politician and former Member of Parliament. He is the current leader of the Eelam People's Revolutionary Liberation Front (EPRLF), a member of the Tamil National Alliance (TNA).

== Early life ==
Premachandran was born on 8 November 1957, the son of a farmer. He was educated at Uruthirapuram Maha Vidyalayam and Senguntha Hindu College. He then joined Waterloo College, London and Madras Christian College where he studied political science.

Premachandran got involved in the Sri Lankan Tamil nationalism movement whilst at school and in 1976, whilst in London, he joined the Eelam Revolutionary Organisation of Students (EROS). He received military training from the Palestinians in Lebanon. In 1979 K. Pathmanabha left EROS to form the Eelam People's Revolutionary Liberation Front (EPRLF) and Premachandran joined him. He took on the nom de guerre Suresh and was a member of the EPRLF's central committee and politburo. Premachandran took on the leadership of EPRLF following the assassination of Pathmanabha by the Liberation Tigers of Tamil Eelam on 19 June 1990.

== Career ==
Premachandran was one of the ENDLF/EPRLF/TELO/TULF alliance's candidates in Jaffna District at the 1989 parliamentary election. He was elected and entered Parliament.

On 20 October 2001 the All Ceylon Tamil Congress, EPRLF, Tamil Eelam Liberation Organization and Tamil United Liberation Front formed the Tamil National Alliance (TNA). He contested the 2001 parliamentary election as one of the TNA's candidates in Jaffna District but failed to get elected.

Premachandran contested the 2004 parliamentary election as one of the TNA's candidates in Jaffna District. He was elected and re-entered Parliament. He was re-elected at the 2010 parliamentary election. He failed to get re-elected at the 2015 parliamentary election after coming seventh amongst the TNA candidates.

== Electoral history ==
Electoral history of Suresh Premachandran
Election	Constituency	Party	Votes	Result
1989 parliamentary	Jaffna District	EPRLF	20,738	Elected
2001 parliamentary	Jaffna District	TNA	13,302	Not elected
2004 parliamentary	Jaffna District	TNA	45,786	Elected
2010 parliamentary	Jaffna District	TNA	16,425	Elected
2015 parliamentary	Jaffna District	TNA	29,906	Not elected
