= S. Kishore =

Sri Lankan politician

Hon. S. Kishore MP

Member of Parliament for Vanni District
- In office 2004–2010

Personal details
- Born: 12 May 1962 (age 63)
- Party: Tamil United Liberation Front

Sivanathan Kishore (Tamil: சிவநாதன் கிசோர்; born 12 May 1962) is a Sri Lankan Tamil politician and former member of parliament.

== Early life ==
Kishore was born on 12 May 1962.

== Career ==
Kishore was a Red Cross official for 14 years. He was arrested by the Sri Lanka Army in April 1999 and handed over to the Terrorist Investigation Division. He was released in August 2000 after 16 months in detention.

Kishore was selected by the rebel Liberation Tigers of Tamil Eelam (LTTE) to be one of the Tamil National Alliance's (TNA) candidates in Vanni District at the 2004 parliamentary election. He was elected and entered Parliament.

In 2010, after the LTTE's military defeat in the civil war, the TNA deselected most of its LTTE appointed MPs, including Kishore. He subsequently joined the governing United People's Freedom Alliance (UPFA). He contested the 2010 parliamentary election as one of the UPFA's candidates in Vanni District but failed to get elected after coming ninth amongst the UPFA candidates.

Kishore contested the 2015 parliamentary election as one of the Tamil United Liberation Front's (TULF) candidates in Vanni District but again the TULF failed to win any seats in Parliament.

== Electoral history ==
Electoral history of S. Kishore
Election	Constituency	Party	Votes	Result
2004 parliamentary	Vanni District	TNA	17,653	Elected
2010 parliamentary	Vanni District	UPFA	1,262	Not elected
2015 parliamentary	Vanni District	TULF		Not elected
