= Pathmini Sithamparanathan =

Sri Lankan politician

Hon. Pathmini Sithamparanathan MP
- பத்மினி சிதம்பரநாதன்

Member of Parliament for Jaffna District
- In office 2004–2010

Personal details
- Born: 26 July 1954 (age 71)
- Party: Tamil National People's Front

Pathmini Sithamparanathan (Tamil: பத்மினி சிதம்பரநாதன்; born 26 July 1954) is a Sri Lankan Tamil politician and former member of parliament.

== Early life ==
Sithamparanathan was born on 26 July 1954.

== Career ==
Sithamparanathan was selected by the militant Liberation Tigers of Tamil Eelam (LTTE) to be one of the Tamil National Alliance's (TNA) candidates in Jaffna District at the 2004 parliamentary election. She was elected and entered Parliament. In March 2010 Sithamparanathan, along with fellow TNA MPs Gajendrakumar Ponnambalam and S. Kajendran, left the TNA and formed the Tamil National People's Front (TNPF).

Sithamparanathan contested the 2010 parliamentary election as one of the TNPF's candidates in Jaffna District but the TNPF failed to win any seats in Parliament. In February 2011 Sithamparanathan became one of the vice-presidents of the TNPF. She contested the 2015 parliamentary election as one of the TNPF's candidates in Jaffna District but again the TNPF failed to win any seats in Parliament.

== Electoral history ==
Electoral history of Pathmini Sithamparanathan
Election	Constituency	Party	Votes	Result
2004 parliamentary	Jaffna District	TNA	68,240	Elected
2010 parliamentary	Jaffna District	TNPF		Not elected
2015 parliamentary	Jaffna District	TNPF		Not elected
