= M. A. Sumanthiran =

Sri Lankan Tamil lawyer and politician

Hon. M. A. Sumanthiran PC
- ம. ஆ. சுமந்திரன் එම් ඒ සුමන්තිරන්
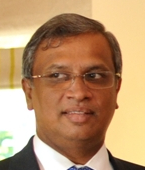
- Sumanthiran in November 2013

Member of the Parliament of Sri Lanka
- In office 2015–2024
- Constituency: Jaffna District
- In office 2010–2015
- Constituency: National List

Personal details
- Born: Mathiaparanan Abraham Sumanthiran; 9 February 1964 (age 62) Inuvil, Ceylon
- Party: Illankai Tamil Arasu Kachchi
- Other political affiliations: Tamil National Alliance
- Education: University of Madras; Monash University
- Profession: Lawyer
- Website: www.sumanthiran.com

Mathiaparanan Abraham Sumanthiran, PC (Tamil: மதியாபரணம் ஆபிரகாம் சுமந்திரன், romanized: Matiyāparaṇam Āpirakām Cumantiraṉ. Sinhala: එම් ඒ සුමන්තිරන්, romanized: M A Sumanthiran) born 9 February 1964) is a Sri Lankan Tamil lawyer and politician. A successful civil lawyer who practices civil litigation, human rights and constitutional law, Sumanthiran has served as Member of Parliament from the Jaffna District from 2015 to 2024, and National List from 2010 to 2015 from the Illankai Tamil Arasu Kachchi.

== Early life ==
Sumanthiran was born on 9 February 1964 at the Church of South India's McLeod Hospital in Inuvil in northern Ceylon. His family are from the Vadamarachchi region of the Jaffna Peninsula; his father is from Karaveddy and his mother is from Kudathanai. Both of his grandfathers were teachers in Vadamarachchi. Sumanthiran grew up in Colombo and was educated at Royal College, Colombo. After school he joined the University of Madras, graduating with a B.Sc. degree in physics. He then proceeded to Sri Lanka Law College, qualifying as an advocate.

Sumanthiran is a Methodist Christian. He was vice-president of the Methodist Church in Sri Lanka.

== Career ==
=== Law ===
Sumanthiran was called to the bar in 1991. He then started practising law in Colombo, appearing in civil litigation cases in the supreme court, court of appeal, commercial high court and district courts. His successful cases include the privatisation of Sri Lanka Insurance Corporation, privatisation of Lanka Marine Services and the closure of Pramuka Bank. He has appeared in a number of fundamental rights cases and judicial reviews of parliamentary legislation and executive action including the charging of levy for water and establishing a revenue authority. He prevented the forced expulsion of Tamils from Colombo and successfully challenged an anti-conversion bill which the courts struck down as being unconstitutional. He has also appeared for petitioners against the proposed 18th and 19th amendments to the constitution which were found to be unconstitutional and required two-thirds majority in Parliament and a referendum. He has worked on a number of public interest cases including the ongoing attempt by residents of the Valikamam North High Security Zone to get their land back from the Sri Lankan military. His human rights work has led to him being threatened, harassed and branded "traitors in black coats" by the Sri Lankan military under the then President's brother Gotabhaya Rajapaksa.

Sumanthiran has become one of Sri Lanka's top human rights and constitutional lawyers. He received an LLM degree in internet and electronic law from Monash University in 2001. He was made a President's Counsel in 2017.

=== Politics ===
Following the 2010 parliamentary election Sumanthiran was appointed to the Parliament of Sri Lanka as a National List MP representing the Tamil National Alliance (TNA). In May 2012 he was elected Illankai Tamil Arasu Kachchi's (ITAK) Secretary for Foreign and Legal Affairs. He became one of ITAK's two Assistant Secretaries in September 2014. Sumanthiran contested the 2015 parliamentary election as one of the TNA's candidates in Jaffna District and was re-elected to Parliament.

In January 2017 the Sri Lanka Police's Terrorist Investigation Department (TID) arrested several former members of the militant Liberation Tigers of Tamil Eelam (LTTE) in connection with the attempted assassination of Sumanthiran. It was alleged that two aborted attempts were made to assassinate Sumanthiran on the B402 Soranapattu-Thalayadi Road near Maruthankerny on 12 December 2016 and 13 January 2017. Five former LTTE cadres - Mariyanayagam Lewis Ajanthan/Louis Mariampillai Ajanthan (alias Jana, Kadalavan) from Championpattu, Maruthankerny; Karalasingham Kulendran (alias Master, Cholai) from Kilinochchi; Murugiah Thavaventhan (alias Vendran) from Kilinochchi; Chandrasekaralingam Vasudevan/Gnanasekaralingam Rajmathan (alias Mathan) from Trincomalee; and Velayanthan Vijayan from Mannar - were charged with possession of explosives and narcotics but the TID informed the magistrates court in Kilinochchi that there had been a plot to assassinate Sumanthiran. The five suspects were bailed in September 2017 by the High Court in Jaffna . The suspects weren't initially charged under the draconian Prevention of Terrorism Act (PTA) but in July 2018 they were indicted under PTA regulations at the High Court in Colombo.

Sumanthiran was re-elected at the 2020 parliamentary election. The preferential vote count held at Jaffna Central College on 6 August 2020 was marred by violent clashes between supporters of various candidates from various parties. Relatives of TNA candidate Sashikala Raviraj (widow of Nadarajah Raviraj) accused Sumanthiran of interfering on the vote count. However, the Center for Monitoring Election Violence, an independent election monitoring body who were present at the count, blamed the incident on lack of understanding of the counting process by candidates and their supporters combined with ability to spread unsubstantiated rumours on social media. Sumanthiran denied the allegations, pointing out the counts were carried out and verified at different locations in each polling division, where counting agents for each candidate were present, before the results were brought to the primary counting centre at Jaffna Central College.

Sumanthiran is one of a trio of MPs (the other two being R. Sampanthan and Mavai Senathirajah) who lead the TNA.

In January 2024, he ran for the leadership of the ITAK against S. Yogeswaran and S. Shritharan. Shritharan was elected by secret ballot on 21 January 2024. The same year he lost his seat at the 2024 parliamentary election.

== Electoral history ==
Electoral history of M. A. Sumanthiran
Election	Constituency	Party	Alliance	Votes	Result
2015 parliamentary	Jaffna District	Illankai Tamil Arasu Kachchi	Tamil National Alliance	58,043	Elected
2020 parliamentary	Jaffna District	Illankai Tamil Arasu Kachchi	Tamil National Alliance	27,834	Elected
2024 parliamentary	Jaffna District	Illankai Tamil Arasu Kachchi	-	27,834	Not elected
