= Tamil National Alliance =

Centre-left political alliance in Sri Lanka

Tamil National Alliance தமிழ் தேசிய கூட்டமைப்பு
- Abbreviation: TNA
- President: R. Sampanthan
- Secretary-General: Mavai Senathirajah
- Deputy President: A. Vinayagamoorthy
- Deputy Secretary: Selvam Adaikalanathan; Suresh Premachandran
- Founded: 20 October 2001
- Dissolved: 2024
- Headquarters: 6, 1st Lane, Point Pedro Road, Jaffna, Sri Lanka
- Ideology: Tamil nationalism; Regionalism; Federalism; Formerly: Separatism
- Political position: Centre-left
- Colours: Yellow; Red

The Tamil National Alliance (TNA; Tamil: தமிழ்த் தேசியக் கூட்டமைப்பு; ISO 15919: tamiḻt tēciyakkūṭṭamaippu) was a political alliance in Sri Lanka which represented the Sri Lankan Tamil minority of the country. It was formed in October 2001 by a group of moderate Tamil nationalist parties and former Tamil militant groups. The alliance originally supported self-determination in an autonomous state (Tamil Eelam) for the island's Tamils. It supported negotiations with the rebel Liberation Tigers of Tamil Eelam (LTTE) to resolve the civil war in Sri Lanka. The TNA was considered a political proxy of the LTTE, with the LTTE personally selecting some of its candidates, even though its leadership maintains it never supported the LTTE and merely negotiated with the LTTE just as the government did.

Soon after its formation in 2001, the alliance began to make a more pro-LTTE stance, supporting their "freedom struggle" and recognizing them as the sole representative of the Tamils. In an interview, Selvam Adaikalanathan explained that it would be a disservice to the Tamil people to oppose the LTTE, and believed that victory could only be achieved if all Tamil groups set aside their differences and stood as a united front. Following the end of the civil war and the defeat of the LTTE, the TNA dropped its demands for an independent state, saying that it is ready to accept federalism and regional self-rule. The TNA and its supporters have been subject to numerous attacks during its existence and three of its sitting Members of Parliament have been assassinated, allegedly by government-backed paramilitary groups.

In 2015, TNA consisted of four parties: the Eelam People's Revolutionary Liberation Front, the Ilankai Tamil Arasu Kachchi (ITAK), the People's Liberation Organisation of Tamil Eelam and the Tamil Eelam Liberation Organization. The alliance began to fall apart during the lead-up to the 2024 presidential election, and in the following parliamentary election, the alliance split into various factions, with each contesting separately at the election. As a result, the Tamil nationalist vote was split between several parties, including the ITAK, the Democratic Tamil National Alliance, the Tamil People's Alliance, the Eros Democratic Front, the All Ceylon Tamil Congress (ACTC) and the People's Struggle Alliance.

At the end of its parliamentary lifespan, the TNA had 10 members in the national parliament. It controlled the provincial government in the Northern Province and was part of the provincial government in the Eastern Province. It also controlled 33 local authorities in the north and east. The leader of the alliance, R. Sampanthan, served as the leader of the opposition from September 2015 to December 2018.

== History ==
The TNA was formed in October 2001 to contest the 2001 parliamentary election on a common platform. On 20 October 2001 a Memorandum of Understanding was signed between the All Ceylon Tamil Congress (ACTC), Eelam People's Revolutionary Liberation Front (EPRLF), Tamil Eelam Liberation Organization (TELO) and Tamil United Liberation Front (TULF). At the 2001 parliamentary election, the TNA, contesting under the name and symbol of the TULF, received 348,164 votes (3.89%) and won 15 out of 225 seats in the Sri Lankan parliament.

Soon after its formation, the TNA began to make a more pro-LTTE stance, supporting their "freedom struggle" and recognising them as the sole representative of the Sri Lankan Tamils. This caused a split within the TULF. Some members of the TULF, led by its president V. Anandasangaree, were opposed to the LTTE. Anandasangaree refused to allow the TNA to use the TULF name during the 2004 parliamentary election. This caused the members of TULF who wished to remain with the TNA to resurrect the Illankai Tamil Arasu Kachchi (ITAK) political party. At the 2004 parliamentary election the TNA, contesting under the name and symbol of the ITAK, received 633,654 votes (6.84%) and won 22 out of 225 seats in parliament.

The TNA boycotted the 2008 local authority election in Batticaloa District and the 2008 Eastern Provincial Council election due to threats posed by the government backed Tamil Makkal Viduthalai Pulikal (TMVP) paramilitary group and opposition to the de-merger of the North Eastern Province.

The civil war ended in May 2009 after the LTTE were defeated by the Sri Lankan military. A United Nations report found that as many as 40,000 civilians may have been killed in the final months of the civil war, mostly as a result of indiscriminate shelling by the Sri Lankan military. There are widespread allegations that both sides committed atrocities and human rights violations including war crimes. The TNA has consistently campaigned for an independent international investigation into the alleged war crimes.

At the 2010 presidential election, the TNA supported common opposition candidate Sarath Fonseka who, as Commander of the Sri Lanka Army, had played a key role in the LTTE's defeat. In March 2010 the TNA dropped its demand for a separate Tamil state, advocating instead a federal solution with significant devolution and merger of the Northern and Eastern provinces. In March 2010 ACTC and its leader Gajendrakumar Ponnambalam, along with fellow TNA MPs S. Kajendran and Pathmini Sithamparanathan, left the TNA and formed the Tamil National People's Front (TNPF). At the 2010 parliamentary election the TNA received 233,190 votes (2.90%) and won 14 out of 225 seats in parliament.

At the 2013 provincial council election, the first elections for provincial councils in the Northern Province, the TNA secured nearly 80% of the votes, winning 30 of the 38 seats on the Northern Provincial Council. The TNA's C. V. Vigneswaran was sworn in as the first democratically elected Chief Minister of the Northern Province on 7 October 2013.

At the 2015 presidential election, the TNA supported common opposition candidate Maithripala Sirisena. Newly elected president Sirisena formed a national unity government after the election but the TNA chose not to join the new government, saying that, although the TNA supported Sirisena's policies for political reform, a political solution must first be found to address Tamil grievances before the TNA would consider joining the government. The TNA was however represented by its leader Sampanthan on the National Executive Council.

In March 2015 the TNA joined an all party provincial government in the Eastern Province. Two TNA provincial councillors were appointed to the province's Board of Ministers.

At the 2015 parliamentary election, the TNA received 515,963 votes (4.62%) and won 16 out of 225 seats in parliament. After the election, Sampanthan was recognised as Leader of the Opposition in parliament.

== Manifesto and policies ==
Tamil National Alliances manifesto were based on what is known as the Thimpu principles amongst Sri Lankan Tamil nationalists. But the TNA later rejected separatism preferring power devolution to the provinces and stated that they accept that Sri Lanka is a united state and the TNA does not intent to form a separate state.

The current political manifesto and policies of the TNA are,

- The Tamils are a distinct People and from time immemorial have inhabited this island together with the Sinhalese People and others
- The contiguous preponderantly Tamil-speaking Northern and Eastern provinces is the historical habitation of the Tamil-speaking Peoples
- The Tamil People are entitled to the right to self-determination
- Power sharing arrangements must be established in a unit of a merged Northern and Eastern Provinces based on a Federal structure, in a manner also acceptable to the Tamil-speaking Muslim people
- Devolution of power on the basis of shared sovereignty shall necessarily be over land, law and order, socio-economic development including health and education, resources and fiscal powers.

The TNA also stands for,

- There must be meaningful de-militarization resulting in the return to the pre-war situation as it existed in 1983 before the commencement of hostilities by the removal of armed forces, military apparatuses and High Security/Restricted Zones from the Northern and Eastern Provinces
- Tamil People who have been displaced in the North and the East due to the conflict must be speedily resettled in their original places; housing provided, their livelihoods restored and their dignity respected
- An independent International Investigation must be conducted into the allegations of violations of international human rights and humanitarian laws made against both the Government of Sri Lanka and the LTTE during the last stages of the war, the truth ascertained and justice to victims and reparation including compensation must be ensured
- Persons who are detained without charges must be released promptly and a general amnesty should be granted to all other political prisoners
- There must be finality reached with regard to thousands of missing persons and compensation must be paid to the next of kin
- Tamils who fled the country must be permitted to return to their homes and a conducive atmosphere created for their return
- A comprehensive programme for the development of the North and East including the creation of employment opportunities for the youth will be undertaken with the active support of the Sri Lankan State, the Tamil Diaspora and the International Community

== Attacks and assassinations ==
The TNA and its supporters have been subject to numerous attacks during its existence.

Batticaloa District parliamentary candidate Rajan Sathiyamoorthy was shot dead on 30 March 2004 at his home in Batticaloa. The LTTE was blamed for the assassination. Former Ampara District MP A. Chandranehru was shot dead on 7 February 2005 as he was travelling in Batticaloa District. The government backed Tamil Makkal Viduthalai Pulikal (TMVP) and Eelam National Democratic Liberation Front (ENDLF) paramilitary groups claimed responsibility for the assassination.

National List MP Joseph Pararajasingham was shot dead on 25 December 2005 as he attended Midnight Mass in Batticaloa. The government backed Eelam People's Democratic Party (EPDP) and TMVP paramilitary groups have been blamed the assassination. Pararajasingham's nominated replacement Vanniasingham Vigneswaran was shot dead on 7 April 2006 in Trincomalee. The TMVP was blamed for the assassination.

Former Jaffna District MP S. Sivamaharajah was shot dead on 20 August 2006 outside his home in Tellippalai. The EPDP was blamed for the assassination. Jaffna District MP Nadarajah Raviraj was shot dead on 10 November 2006 as left his home in Colombo for work. The TNA blamed the assassination on paramilitary groups working with the army. The EPDP and Gotabhaya Rajapaksa, brother of President Mahinda Rajapaksa, were also blamed.

Jaffna District MP K. Sivanesan was killed by claymore mines on 6 March 2008 near Maankulam, Mullaitivu District as he returned home to Mallavi after attending Parliament in Colombo. The TNA blamed the assassination on the army's Deep Penetration Unit.

On 7 March 2011 Jaffna District MP S. Shritharan was travelling in a van on the A12 highway near Nochchiyagama, Anuradhapura District when three men standing by a white van parked on the roadside pulled out guns and started shooting and throwing hand grenades at Shritharan's van. Sritharan's police guard fired back, forcing the attackers to flee in their white van which had no number plates. No one was hurt in the incident. Shritharan has blamed the EPDP, a government backed paramilitary group, for the assassination attempt. A TNA local election campaign meeting in Alaveddy on 16 June 2011 was attacked allegedly by army personnel.

A mob, allegedly from the security forces, attacked a TNA meeting at MP S. Shritharan's in Kilinochchi on 30 March 2013, injuring 13. During the 2013 provincial council election campaign TNA activist Rasiah Kavithan was clubbed to death by United People's Freedom Alliance supporters on 16 September 2013 in Puthukkudiyiruppu, Mullaitivu District. A group of around 70 armed men in military uniform attacked the home of TNA provincial council candidate Ananthi Sasitharan in Chulipuram on 20 September 2013, injuring some of her supporters and an election monitor.

== Electoral history ==
=== Parliamentary ===
Election	Northern Province			Eastern Province			National		
Election	Votes	%	Seats	Votes	%	Seats	Votes	%	Seats
2001 Parliamentary	144,274	51.32%	9	191,194	30.81%	5	348,164	3.89%	15 / 225
2004 Parliamentary	348,155	82.03%	13	285,499	39.96%	7	633,654	6.84%	22 / 225
2010 Parliamentary	106,792	41.80%	8	126,398	21.89%	5	233,190	2.90%	14 / 225
2015 Parliamentary	297,463	63.96%	9	218,500	29.31%	5	515,963	4.62%	16 / 225
2020 Parliamentary	182,883	32.26%	6	144,285	16.09%	3	327,168	2.82%	10 / 225

=== Provincial ===
Election	Northern Province			Eastern Province			National		
Election	Votes	%	Seats	Votes	%	Seats	Votes	%	Seats
2012 Provincial	-	-	-	193,827	30.59%	11	-	-	-
2013 Provincial	353,595	78.48%	30	-	-	-	-	-	-

=== Local ===
Election	Northern Province			Eastern Province			National		
Election	Votes	%	Seats	Votes	%	Seats	Votes	%	Seats
2006 Local	-	-	-	96,466	21.69%	69	-	-	-
2009 Local	12,287	36.99%	13	-	-	-	-	-	-
2011 Local	190,625	62.87%	226	64,453	13.06%	49	255,078	2.99%	275

== Election results ==
=== 2001 parliamentary election ===
In the first parliamentary election contested by the Tamil National Alliance, the 5 December 2001 election, the TNA led by Rajavarothiam Sampanthan won 3.88% of the popular vote and 15 out of 225 seats in the Sri Lankan parliament.

Votes and seats won by TNA by electoral district

Electoral District	Votes	%	Seats	Turnout	TNA MPs
Ampara	48,789	17.41%	1	82.51%	A. Chandranehru (TULF)
Batticaloa	86,284	48.17%	3	68.20%	G. Krishnapillai (ACTC); Joseph Pararajasingham (TULF); Thambiraja Thangavadivel (TELO)
Colombo	12,696	1.20%	0	76.31%	
Jaffna	102,324	54.84%	6	31.14%	V. Anandasangaree (TULF); Gajendrakumar Ponnambalam (ACTC); Nadarajah Raviraj (TULF); Mavai Senathirajah (TULF); M. K. Shivajilingam (TELO); A. Vinayagamoorthy (ACTC)
Trincomalee	56,121	34.83%	1	79.88%	R. Sampanthan (TULF)
Vanni	41,950	44.39%	3	46.77%	Selvam Adaikalanathan (TELO); Sivasakthy Ananthan (EPRLF); Irasa Kuhaneswaran (TELO)
National List			1		M. Sivasithamparam (TULF), died 5 June 2002; K. Thurairetnasingam (TULF) (replaces M. Sivasithamparam)
Total	348,164	3.88%	15	76.03%	
Source:"Parliamentary General Election 2001, Final District Results". Department of Elections, Sri Lanka.

=== 2004 parliamentary election ===
In the 2 April 2004 parliamentary election in which the United People's Freedom Alliance led by President Kumaratunga came to power, the Tamil National Alliance led by Rajavarothiam Sampanthan won 6.84% of the popular vote and 22 out of 225 seats in the Sri Lankan parliament.

Votes and seats won by TNA by electoral district

Electoral District	Votes	%	Seats	Turnout	TNA MPs
Ampara	55,533	19.13%	1	81.42%	K. Pathmanathan, died 21 May 2009; Thomas Thangathurai William, from 12 June 2009 (replaces K. Pathmanathan)
Batticaloa	161,011	66.71%	4	83.58%	Senathirajah Jeyanandamoorthy; Thanmanpillai Kanagasabai; Thangeswary Kathiraman; Kingsley Rasanayagam, resigned April 2004; P. Ariyanethiran, from 18 May 2004 (replaces Kingsley Rasanayagam)
Jaffna	257,320	90.60%	8	47.38%	Selvarajah Kajendren; Gajendrakumar Ponnambalam (ACTC); Suresh Premachandran (EPRLF); Nadarajah Raviraj (ITAK), murdered 10 November 2006; Mavai Senathirajah (ITAK); M. K. Shivajilingam (TELO); K. Sivanesan, murdered 6 March 2008; Pathmini Sithamparanathan; Nallathamby Srikantha (TELO), from 30 November 2006 (replaces Nadarajah Raviraj); Solomon Cyril, from 9 April 2008 (replaces Kidnan Sivanesan)
Trincomalee	68,955	37.72%	2	85.44%	R. Sampanthan (ITAK); K. Thurairetnasingam (ITAK)
Vanni	90,835	64.71%	5	66.64%	Selvam Adaikalanathan (TELO); Sivasakthy Ananthan (EPRLF); Sathasivam Kanagaratnam; Sivanathan Kisshor; Vino Noharathalingam (TELO)
National List			2		M. K. Eelaventhan, expelled from Parliament 14 December 2007 for non-attendance Joseph Pararajasingham (ITAK), murdered 24 December 2005; Chandra Nehru Chandrakanthan, from 27 September 2006 (replaces Joseph Pararajasingham); Raseen Mohammed Imam, from 5 February 2008 (replaces M. K. Eelaventhan)
Total	633,654	6.84%	22	75.96%	
Source:"Parliamentary General Election 2004, Final District Results". Department of Elections, Sri Lanka.

=== 2010 parliamentary election ===
In the 2010 Sri Lankan parliamentary election, in which the United People's Freedom Alliance , led by Mahinda Rajapaksa, retained power, the Tamil National Alliance, led by Rajavarothiam Sampanthan, won 2.9% of the popular vote and 14 out of 225 seats in the Sri Lankan parliament.

Votes and seats won by the TNA by electoral district

Electoral District	Votes	%	Seats	Turnout	TNA MPs
Ampara	26,895	10.47%	1	64.74%	Podiappuhamy Piyasena
Batticaloa	66,235	36.67%	3	58.56%	P. Ariyanethiran (ITAK); P. Selvarasa (ITAK); S. Yogeswaran (ITAK)
Jaffna	65,119	43.85%	5	23.33%	Suresh Premachandran (EPRLF); E. Saravanapavan (ITAK); Mavai Senathirajah (ITAK); S. Sritharan (ITAK); A. Vinayagamoorthy
Trincomalee	33,268	23.81%	1	62.20%	R. Sampanthan (ITAK)
Vanni	41,673	38.96%	3	43.89%	Selvam Adaikalanathan (TELO); Sivasakthy Ananthan (EPRLF); Vino Noharathalingam (TELO)
National List			1		M. A. Sumanthiran (ITAK)
Total	233,190	2.90%	14	61.26%	
Source:"Parliamentary General Election – 2010". Department of Elections, Sri Lanka.

=== 2015 parliamentary election ===
The Tamil National Alliance won 16 seats, an increase of two from 2010.
