= 2020 Sri Lankan parliamentary election =

- 5 August 2020

All 225 seats in the Parliament of Sri Lanka 113 seats needed for a majority
- Turnout: 75.89% (▼1.77pp)
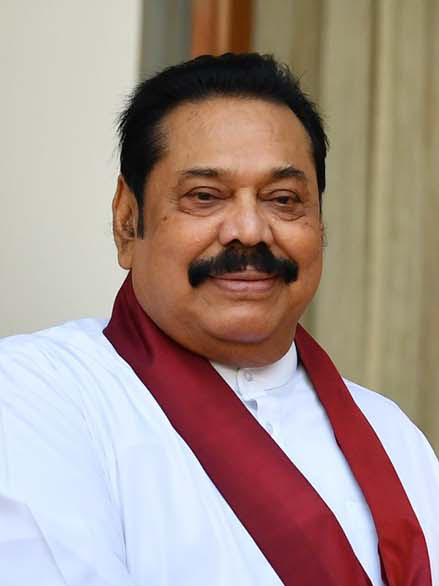

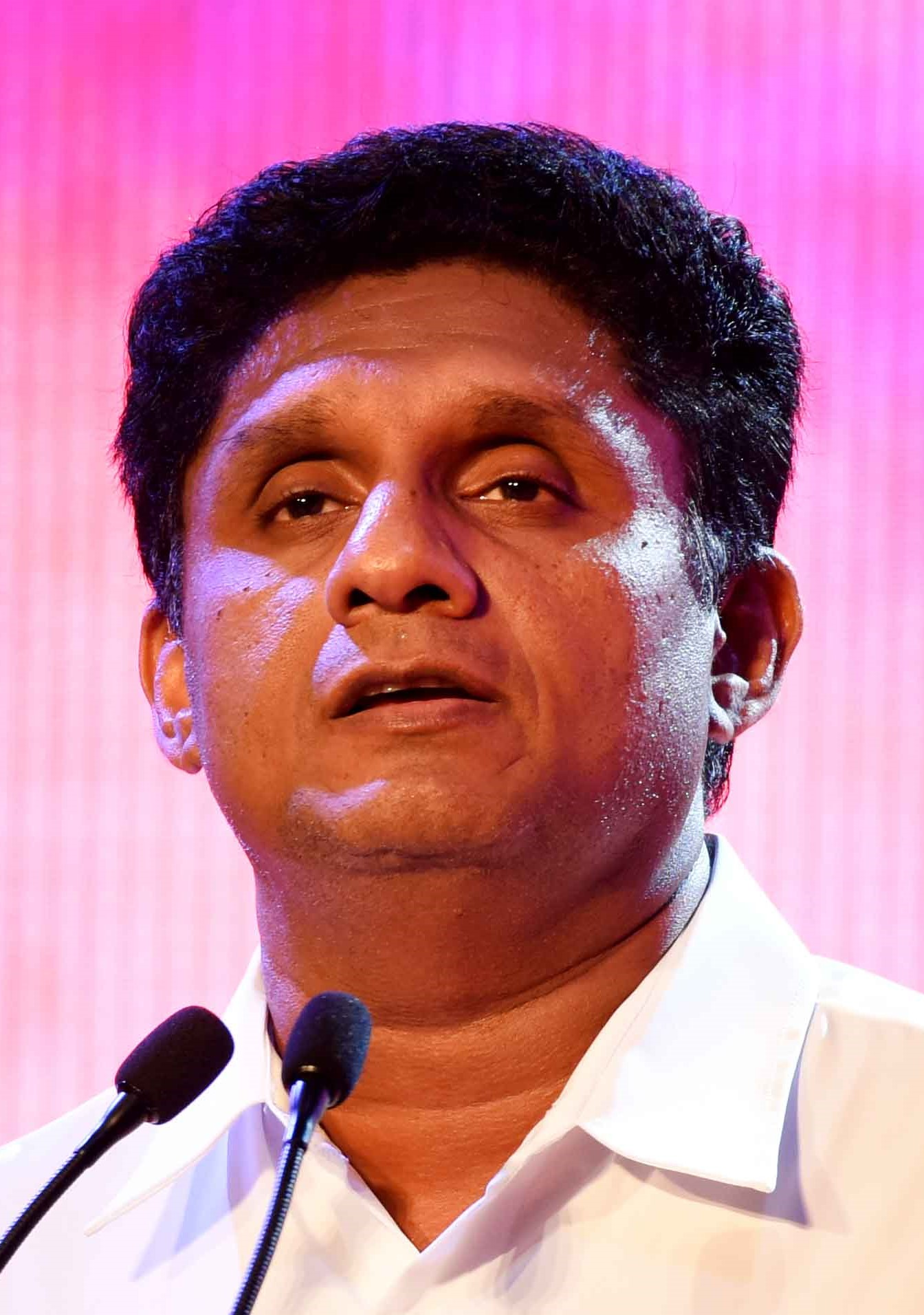

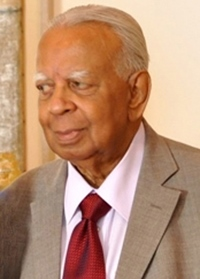

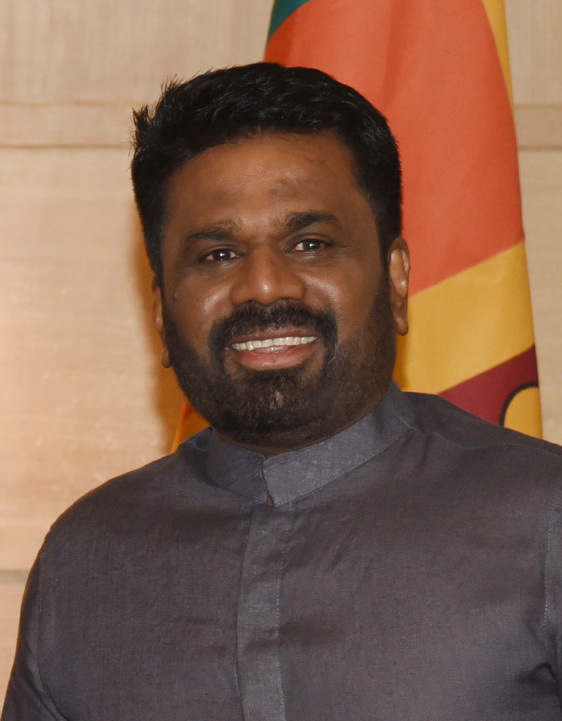

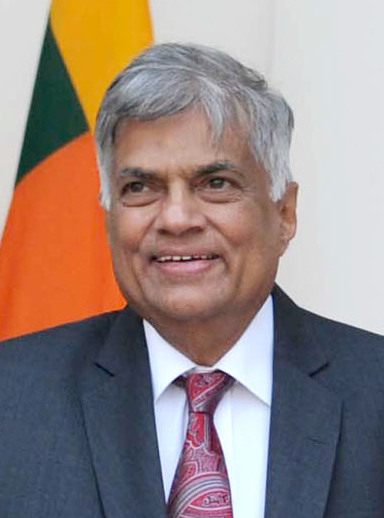
	First party	Second party	Third party
Leader	Mahinda Rajapaksa	Sajith Premadasa	R. Sampanthan
Party	SLPFA	SJB	TNA
Last election	Did not exist	Did not exist	4.62%, 16 seats
Seats won	145	54	10
Seat change	New party	New party	▼6
Popular vote	6,853,690	2,771,980	327,168
Percentage	59.09%	23.90%	2.82%
Swing	New party	New party	▼1.80pp
	Fourth party	Fifth party
Leader	Anura Kumara Dissanayake	Ranil Wickremesinghe
Party	NPP	UNP
Last election	4.87%, 6 seats (Note: Represents seats won by the Janatha Vimukthi Peramuna (JVP) at the 2015 parliamentary election.)	45.66%, 106 seats (Note: Represents seats won by the United National Front for Good Governance (UNFGG) at the 2015 parliamentary election.)
Seats won	3	1
Seat change	▼3	▼105
Popular vote	445,958	249,435
Percentage	3.84%	2.15%
Swing	▼1.03pp	▼43.51pp
- Results by polling division: SLPFA SJB TNA SLFP EPDP Other parties
Prime Minister before election
Mahinda Rajapaksa
SLPFA
Prime Minister after election
Mahinda Rajapaksa
SLPFA

Parliamentary elections were held in Sri Lanka on 5 August 2020 to elect 225 members to Sri Lanka's 16th Parliament. 16,263,885 people were eligible to vote in the election, 31.95% of whom were young voters.

The incumbent Sri Lanka People's Freedom Alliance coalition claimed a landslide victory in the election, winning 145 seats, while Samagi Jana Balawegaya won 54 seats, Tamil National Alliance won 10 seats and National People's Power won 3 seats. The main opposition United National Party suffered its worst showing in history following a split over party leadership, finishing in fifth place with only one seat.

The election was postponed at least twice due to a surge in COVID-19 cases in the country, before the date was finalized as 5 August 2020. Prior to the election, a coronavirus-proof mock election was conducted by the Election Commission in June 2020 as a trial run in order to comply with health guidelines.

Initial reports revealed that the overall voter turnout was estimated at 70%, comparatively less than the turnout of the previous elections, mainly due to COVID-19. Vote counting started on 6 August 2020 at around 9 am. The new parliament is expected to reconvene on 20 August 2020.

In November 2018, the date was briefly moved forward by more than a year to 5 January 2019 after President Maithripala Sirisena dissolved parliament during a constitutional crisis and called for a snap election. The Supreme Court later suspended the dissolution and ordered a halt to the snap election, effectively moving the election's date back to 2020.

== Electoral system ==
The Parliament has 225 members, elected for a five-year term. 196 members are elected in 22 multi-seat constituencies through a proportional representation system where each party is allocated a number of seats from the quota for each district according to the proportion of the total vote that party obtains in the district. The other 29 are elected from the national list, with list members appointed by each party secretary according to the island wide proportional vote the party obtains.

== Contesting parties ==
The main parties and alliances contesting in the election included the alliance of Sri Lankan president Gotabaya Rajapakse, the ruling Sri Lanka People's Freedom Alliance (SLPFA), the main opposition United National Party (UNP) of Ranil Wickremasinghe, Samagi Jana Balawegaya (SJB) of Sajith Premadasa, former opposition TNA of R. Sampanthan and National People's Power (NPP) of Anura Kumara Dissanayake. President Gotabaya was previously elected president in November 2019.

Samagi Jana Balawegaya, a breakaway faction from the United National Party, was formed by Sajith Premadasa in February 2020 following a rift and creative differences between Sajith and Ranil Wickremasinghe regarding the leadership of the UNP. The party itself claimed a position as a main opposition party prior to the election despite being newly formed.

== Development ==
On 19 March 2020, Chairman of the Election Commission Mahinda Deshapriya revealed that the election would be postponed indefinitely due to the COVID-19 pandemic. The Sri Lankan government initially insisted that scheduled forthcoming the election would proceed as planned on 25 April despite the COVID-19 pandemic in Sri Lanka, and the authorities banned election rallies and meetings. During the video conference with SAARC leaders, Sri Lankan President Gotabaya Rajapaksa initially confirmed that the parliamentary elections would be held as scheduled. Even with the president's comments holding the elections as scheduled, the Election Commission in Sri Lanka put off the date to 20 June 2020, using its powers. This created a crisis between the president's office and the Constitution, and the matter went to the courts.

On 10 June 2020, Election Commissioner Mahinda Deshapriya confirmed that the postponed parliamentary elections would be held on 5 August 2020 with strict health measures and guidelines.

According to various sources, vote turnout initially had a slow start, mainly due to the virus fears, but started to pick up gradually in late morning. This was the first Sri Lankan general election held amid a disease outbreak; the Election Commission recommended that voters bring their own blue or black ballpoint pen in order to make the proceedings easier along with precautionary distancing guidelines. The authorities also required that voters wear face masks and use hand sanitizer upon entering and exiting polling stations.

On election day, Election Commissioner Mahinda Deshapriya cast his vote by visiting the polling station rather than opting for a postal vote. This also marked his first voting appearance in a polling station in nine years. Approximately 82,000 security personnel and more than 60,000 health officials were deployed during the election. The Colombo Stock Exchange was closed early at around 12:30 pm.

== Exit poll opinions ==
Initial exit poll reports and opinions stated that the ruling SLPFA were favourites to emerge victorious in the elections, mainly owing to the predominant success in curbing the COVID-19 pandemic and due to the negative publicity about the UNP-led government, which was accused of a major intelligence failure which was triggered by the aftermath of the 2019 Easter attacks.

== Election campaigns ==
The candidates were reported to have spent 2.2 billion rupees during the election campaign, with SJB being reported to have spent a higher amount compared to other parties. Campaigns were mostly arranged by the candidates on social media platforms such as Facebook, due to the ban on public gatherings owing to the COVID-19 pandemic. In June 2020, UNP became the first party to launch the digital election campaign.

Sri Lanka's treasury department issued 8.5 billion rupees to the election department for election expenditures. In July 2020, President Gotabaya of SLPFA was awarded the Zero carbon certificate for conducting his election campaign representing SLPFA in eco-friendly manner. His election campaign also became the first zero carbon election campaign in the world.

SLPP's political campaign was primarily based on economic revival as well making changes to the constitution, including amending the Nineteenth Amendment to the Constitution, controversially passed following the 2015 parliamentary election. Rajapaksa brothers were critical of the 19th amendment as it reduced the major powers of the executive President.

All election campaigns were restricted on 2 August 2020 by the Election Commissioner.

== Timeline ==
2018

- 9 November 2018 – President Maithripala Sirisena dissolves parliament and calls general elections to be held on 5 January 2019.
- 13 December 2018 – The Supreme Court of Sri Lanka ruled unanimously that President Maithripala Sirisena's order to dissolve Parliament and hold new elections was unconstitutional.
- 16 December 2018 – Ranil Wickramasinghe was sworn back in as Prime Minister after the Supreme Court ruled that Mahinda Rajapaksa can not act as Prime Minister.

2019

- 21 November 2019 – Incumbent Prime Minister Ranil Wickramasinghe resigns and President Gotabaya Rajapaksa appoints his brother Mahinda Rajapakse as the new Prime Minister.

2020

- 30 January 2020 – United National Party working committee approves Leader of Opposition Sajith Premadasa as its Prime Minister candidate.
- 10 February 2020 – Leader of the opposition Sajith Premadasa forms a new alliance called Samagi Jana Balawegaya following the rift between him and United National Party leader Ranil Wickremasinghe due to political creative differences.
- 17 February 2020 – Sri Lanka People's Freedom Alliance registered under the leadership of Mahinda Rajapaksa and Maithripala Sirisena named as chairperson.
- 3 March 2020 – The President dissolved Parliament, with elections set on 25 April 2020 and the nomination period ending 18 March.
- 19 March 2020 – Election Commission postpones the elections without announcing a new date due to the COVID-19 pandemic.
- 3 April 2020 – Elections Commission write to the president asking him to see advise for a new date or make an alternative since they are unable to hold the elections as per the Gazette.
- 9 April 2020 – President's Secretary PB Jayasundara response to the commission that president will not get any advice from the courts on the elections, and it is the commissions' responsibility to hold the elections, warning of Constitutional Crisis.
- 20 April 2020 – Election Commission of Sri Lanka declared 20 June 2020 as the date of elections, after a member of commission Professor Ratnajeevan Hoole object to hold the election on 28 May 2020 with the government influence.
- 5 May 2020 – Newspaper editor Victor Ivan and seven others filed a Fundamental Rights petition in Supreme Court seeking an order quashing the Extraordinary Gazette notification declaring the General Election on 20 June.
- 6 May 2020 – Samagi Jana Balawegaya files a Fundamental Rights petition challenging the Gazette notification issued by the Elections Commission declaring the General Election to be held on 20 June.
- 9 May 2020 – Champika Ranawaka of Jathika Hela Urumaya and Kumara Welgama of the New Lanka Freedom Party file a Fundamental Rights petition challenging the Gazette notification issued by the Elections Commission declaring the General Election to be held on 20 June.
- 18 May 2020 – Supreme Court's five-member judge bench started hearing 8 petitions against the 20 June general election date.
- 20 May 2020 – Elections Commission inform the Supreme court that 20 June fix date is no longer a possible date for the election.
- 22 May 2020 – Attorney General requests the supreme court to dismiss petitions submitted in relation to the general election without hearings.
- 2 June 2020 – The Supreme Court dismissed all Fundamental Rights petitions filed and denied granting leave to proceed with all petitions.
- 10 June 2020 – Election Commission announces 5 August 2020 as the new date of elections.
- 30 July 2020 – All election campaigning and propaganda activities for the Parliamentary Election 2020 must end at midnight on 2 August, the Elections Commission announced.
- 10 August 2020 – Gotabaya Rajapaksa announces that the Subject Ministers and State Ministers are scheduled to be sworn in at the Magul Maduwa on 12 August 2020.

== Background ==
During the constitutional crisis in 2018, Sirisena dissolved parliament and ordered a snap election after his nominee for Prime Minister, Mahinda Rajapaksa, failed to gain a majority in Parliament to back his nomination.

However, after the constitutionality of the dissolution was challenged before Sri Lanka's Supreme Court, the dissolution was suspended, and the snap election was put on hold while the court case was ongoing. On 13 December 2018, the Supreme Court ruled the dissolution of the parliament unconstitutional, moving the election back to its original date.

On 19 March 2020, the Election Commission postponed the elections without announcing a new date due to the COVID-19 pandemic. On 20 May 2020, the Election Commission informed that the Supreme Court clarified a fix date 20 June 2020 for the election. On 10 June 2020, Election Commissioner Mahinda Deshapriya confirmed that the postponed parliamentary elections were to be held on 5 August 2020. On 17 July 2020, the Ministry of Health, Nutrition and Indigenous Medicine issued a gazette regarding the health guidelines for the election after a long delay.

== COVID-19 ==
On 19 March 2020, Sri Lanka reported an increase in cases from the COVID-19 pandemic, but the government went ahead with nominations for the election until 18 March 2020. On 19 March, soon after the nominations ended, the Elections Commission with its powers postponed the elections. The proposed date which was initially mentioned as 25 April 2020 was pushed back until 20 June 2020 due to the virus outbreak, and was later postponed further to its final date. Sri Lanka also joined countries such as Poland, South Korea, Singapore, Syria and Serbia to have held the elections in the middle of the COVID-19 pandemic. Sri Lanka is also the first South Asian nation to hold elections in the middle of the pandemic.

The health authorities also made special arrangements regarding the safety of the voters by disinfecting the polling station including the internal and external booths of the station with sanitizers prior to the election.

== Election violations ==
Around 340 minor incidents were reported regarding the election violations according to the survey of the Centre for Monitoring Election Violence. It reported around 167 cases of illegal campaigning, 59 cases of intimidation, 24 cases of illegal poster cutouts and some cases regarding health guidelines violations. SLPFA party recorded the highest number of complaints around 161, while SJB recorded complaints of 40 and 18 complaints were recorded against the UNP.

=== Alleged manipulation attempts ===
Candidate Sashikala Raviraj accused Jaffna District candidate M. A. Sumanthiran who was representing Tamil National Alliance of misconduct during the preference vote count in the Jaffna District and being seated inside the vote counting centre after the conclusion of the parliamentary election in contrast to the regulations as candidates are restricted from entering the counting centre during the process of counting votes after the election. However Center for Monitoring Election Violence (CMEV) noted that the claims of manipulation are false and is driven by social media misinformation and ignorance of the counting process. Sumanthiran denied the accusations noting that counting is done at different locations and brought to the electoral district's primary counting centre and that counting booth has agents from all parties who must provide their verification and agreement for the results to be finalised. Sumanthiran revealed that he was at his house during the counting and was not present in any counting centre and only visited the announcement area when the results were going to be released and that other candidates including Sashikala Raviraj were also present and spoke with the Returning Officer.

=== Allegations of unlawful action against the UNP ===
The SJB accused the head of the UNP, Ranil Wickremesinghe, of attempting to save his seat in the parliament through preference votes and SJB claimed that the UNP didn't attain at least 5% of the total votes in order to secure a national seat in the parliament.

== Electoral system ==
196 MPs were elected from 22 multi-member electoral districts using the D'Hondt method with an open list, a proportional representation system (with a de facto threshold that is on average 11%). The remaining 29 seats were allocated to contesting parties and independent groups in proportion to their share of the national vote. The electoral commission announced that voters can vote for one main party and can cast votes to a maximum of 3 individuals as preferential votes.

== Results ==
The first official results were released on 6 August 2020 in the afternoon starting with the postal votes in the Galle District.

The SLPFA became the largest group in Parliament after securing 59.09% of votes and 145 seats, winning in 18 electoral districts, whilst the main opposition SJB won 23.90% of votes and 54 seats. The SLPFA managed to exceed the majority cutoff of 113, obtaining 128 seats from districts and 17 seats from the national list, for a total of 145 seats. The result is expected to further increase the influence the Rajapaksa family has over Sri Lankan politics, and the SLPFA only requires five seats from collaborating smaller parties to reach the majority needed to enact constitutional changes, including some that may overturn amendments enacted in 2015 (which included strengthening the role of Parliament and the Prime Minister, as well as putting independent commissions in charge of judiciary appointments, police, public services and the conduct of elections). A total of four other members of the Rajapaksa family (aside from Mahinda) were elected as MPs, including his son Namal, his eldest brother Chamal and his son Sashindra, and his nephew, Nipuna Ranawaka. The SJB, which received second highest number of votes and seats in the election, is set to dethrone the UNP as the main opposition party of the country despite being newly formed following a split over disagreements on party leadership. Parties aligned with the Tamil minority lost a few seats, likely weakening their influence and putting into doubt any progress toward their desire for autonomy within a federal state.

The Election Commission revealed that Mahinda Rajapaksa received the highest number of preferential votes during the election with 527,364 votes.

Party	Votes	%	Seats			
Party	Votes	%	District	National	Total	+/–
Sri Lanka People's Freedom Alliance (Note: The SLPFA contested under the name and symbol of SLPP. The alliance consisted of the Ceylon Workers' Congress, Mahajana Eksath Peramuna, National Congress (which contested separately in two districts, Ampara and Polonnaruwa), the National Freedom Front, Pivithuru Hela Urumaya, the Socialist Alliance (consisting of the Communist Party of Sri Lanka, the Democratic Left Front (which contested separately in two districts, Jaffna and Vanni), the Lanka Sama Samaja Party (which contested separately in one district, Jaffna), the National Liberation People's Party and the Sri Lanka People's Party), the Sri Lanka Freedom Party (which contested separately in three districts, Jaffna, Kalutara and Nuwara Eliya) and Sri Lanka Podujana Peramuna).)	6,853,690	59.09	128	17	145	+50
Samagi Jana Balawegaya (Note: Alliance consisting of the All Ceylon Makkal Congress (which contested separately in one district, Ampara), Jathika Hela Urumaya, the New Lanka Freedom Party, the Sri Lanka Muslim Congress (which contested separately in one district, Batticaloa), the Tamil Progressive Alliance (consisting of the National Union of Workers, the United Progressive Alliance, the Democratic People's Front and the Up-Country People's Front) and the United National Party (Sajith wing).)	2,771,980	23.90	47	7	54	New
National People's Power (Note: Including Janatha Vimukthi Peramuna.)	445,958	3.84	2	1	3	–3
Tamil National Alliance (Note: The alliance contested under the name and symbol of Illankai Tamil Arasu Kachchi. It consisted of the Illankai Tamil Arasu Kachchi, the People's Liberation Organisation of Tamil Eelam and the Tamil Eelam Liberation Organization.)	327,168	2.82	9	1	10	–6
United National Party	249,435	2.15	0	1	1	–105
Tamil National People's Front (Note: Including the All Ceylon Tamil Congress.)	67,766	0.58	1	1	2	+2
Our Power of People's Party (Note: Including Bodu Bala Sena.)	67,758	0.58	0	1	1	+1
Tamil Makkal Viduthalai Pulikal	67,692	0.58	1	0	1	+1
Sri Lanka Freedom Party	66,579	0.57	1	0	1	+1
Eelam People's Democratic Party	61,464	0.53	2	0	2	+1
Muslim National Alliance (Note: Consisting of the All Ceylon Makkal Congress, Muslim National Alliance and the Sri Lanka Muslim Congress.)	55,981	0.48	1	0	1	+1
Tamil People's National Alliance (Note: Consisting of the Eelam People's Revolutionary Liberation Front, the Eelam Tamil Self Rule Party, the Tamil National Party and the Tamil People's Alliance.)	51,301	0.44	1	0	1	+1
All Ceylon Makkal Congress	43,319	0.37	1	0	1	+1
National Congress	39,272	0.34	1	0	1	+1
Sri Lanka Muslim Congress	34,428	0.30	1	0	1	0
United Peace Alliance	31,054	0.27	0	0	0	New
All Lanka Tamil Mahasabha	30,031	0.26	0	0	0	New
National Development Front	14,686	0.13	0	0	0	New
Frontline Socialist Party	14,522	0.13	0	0	0	0
Social Democratic Party of Tamils	11,464	0.10	0	0	0	New
Tamil United Liberation Front	9,855	0.08	0	0	0	0
Socialist Party of Sri Lanka	9,368	0.08	0	0	0	New
People's Welfare Front	7,361	0.06	0	0	0	New
Sinhalese National Front	5,056	0.04	0	0	0	New
New Democratic Front	4,883	0.04	0	0	0	New
United Left Front	4,879	0.04	0	0	0	0
Liberal Party of Sri Lanka	4,345	0.04	0	0	0	0
National People's Party	3,813	0.03	0	0	0	New
Democratic United National Front	3,611	0.03	0	0	0	New
National Democratic Front	3,488	0.03	0	0	0	New
Sri Lanka Labour Party	3,134	0.03	0	0	0	0
Democratic Left Front	2,964	0.03	0	0	0	0
New Sinhala Heritage	1,397	0.01	0	0	0	0
United Socialist Party	1,189	0.01	0	0	0	0
Motherland People's Party	1,087	0.01	0	0	0	New
Eelavar Democratic Front	1,035	0.01	0	0	0	0
Socialist Equality Party	780	0.01	0	0	0	0
Lanka Sama Samaja Party	737	0.01	0	0	0	0
All Are Citizens All Are Kings Organization	632	0.01	0	0	0	New
Democratic Unity Alliance	145	0.00	0	0	0	0
Independents	223,622	1.93	0	0	0	0
Total	11,598,929	100.00	196	29	225	0
Valid votes	11,598,929	93.97				
Invalid/blank votes	744,373	6.03				
Total votes	12,343,302	100.00				
Registered voters/turnout	16,263,885	75.89				
Source: Election Commission

=== By district ===
Districts won by SJB
Districts won by SLPFA
Districts won by TNA

District results for the 2020 Sri Lankan parliamentary election
Province	Electoral District	SLPFA			SJB			TNA			NPP			Others			Total			Turnout
Province	Electoral District	Votes	%	Seats	Votes	%	Seats	Votes	%	Seats	Votes	%	Seats	Votes	%	Seats	Votes	%	Seats	Turnout
Western	Colombo	674,603	57.04%	12	387,145	32.73%	6	-	-	-	67,600	5.72%	1	53,428	4.52%	0	1,182,776	100.00%	19	73.94%
Western	Gampaha	807,896	65.76%	13	285,809	23.27%	4	-	-	-	61,833	5.03%	1	72,936	5.94%	0	1,228,474	100.00%	18	73.01%
Western	Kalutara	448,699	64.08%	8	171,988	24.56%	2	-	-	-	33,434	4.77%	0	46,135	6.59%	0	700,256	100.00%	10	76.79%
Central	Kandy	477,446	58.76%	8	234,523	28.86%	4	-	-	-	22,997	2.83%	0	77,612	9.55%	0	812,578	100.00%	12	77.02%
Central	Matale	188,779	65.53%	4	73,955	25.67%	1	-	-	-	7,542	2.62%	0	17,797	6.18%	0	288,073	100.00%	5	76.69%
Central	Nuwara Eliya	230,389	54.47%	5	132,008	31.21%	3	-	-	-	5,043	1.19%	0	55,537	13.13%	0	422,977	100.00%	8	80.49%
Southern	Galle	430,334	70.54%	7	115,456	18.93%	2	-	-	-	29,963	4.91%	0	34,299	5.62%	0	610,052	100.00%	9	74.43%
Southern	Matara	352,217	73.63%	6	72,740	15.21%	1	-	-	-	37,136	7.76%	0	16,286	3.40%	0	478,379	100.00%	7	75.95%
Southern	Hambantota	280,881	75.10%	6	51,758	13.84%	1	-	-	-	31,362	8.39%	0	10,016	2.68%	0	374,017	100.00%	7	79.68%
Northern	Jaffna	-	-	-	13,564	3.78%	0	112,967	31.46%	3	853	0.24%	0	231,746	64.53%	4	359,130	100.00%	7	68.92%
Northern	Vanni	42,524	20.46%	1	37,883	18.23%	1	69,916	33.64%	3	662	0.32%	0	56,852	27.35%	1	207,837	100.00%	6	78.34%
Eastern	Batticaloa	33,424	11.22%	1	28,362	9.52%	0	79,460	26.66%	2	348	0.12%	0	156,418	52.49%	2	298,012	100.00%	5	76.83%
Eastern	Ampara	126,012	32.65%	3	102,274	26.50%	2	25,255	6.54%	0	5,060	1.31%	0	127,396	33.00%	2	385,997	100.00%	7	78.28%
Eastern	Trincomalee	68,681	32.25%	1	86,394	40.56%	2	39,570	18.58%	1	2,226	1.05%	0	16,121	7.57%	0	212,992	100.00%	4	78.62%
North Western	Kurunegala	649,965	66.92%	11	244,860	25.21%	4	-	-	-	36,290	3.74%	0	40,128	4.13%	0	971,243	100.00%	15	75.45%
North Western	Puttalam	220,566	57.26%	5	80,183	20.81%	2	-	-	-	9,944	2.58%	0	74,528	19.35%	1	385,221	100.00%	8	67.47%
North Central	Anuradhapura	344,458	67.95%	7	119,788	23.63%	2	-	-	-	24,492	4.83%	0	18,164	3.58%	0	506,902	100.00%	9	78.19%
North Central	Polonnaruwa	180,847	73.66%	4	47,781	19.46%	1	-	-	-	6,792	2.77%	0	10,099	4.11%	0	245,519	100.00%	5	78.99%
Uva	Badulla	309,538	62.06%	6	144,290	28.93%	3	-	-	-	19,308	3.87%	0	25,659	5.14%	0	498,795	100.00%	9	80.43%
Uva	Monaragala	208,193	74.12%	5	54,147	19.28%	1	-	-	-	11,429	4.07%	0	7,116	2.53%	0	280,885	100.00%	6	80.93%
Sabaragamuwa	Ratnapura	446,668	68.86%	8	155,759	24.01%	3	-	-	-	17,611	2.72%	0	28,576	4.41%	0	648,614	100.00%	11	77.38%
Sabaragamuwa	Kegalle	331,573	66.29%	7	131,317	26.25%	2	-	-	-	14,033	2.81%	0	23,284	4.65%	0	500,207	100.00%	9	76.70%
National List		—N/a		17	—N/a		7	—N/a		1	—N/a		1	—N/a		3	—N/a		29	—N/a
Total		6,853,693	59.09%	145	2,771,984	23.90%	54	327,168	2.82%	10	445,958	3.84%	3	1,200,133	10.35%	13	11,598,936	100.00%	225	75.89%

== Swearing-in ==
Mahinda Rajapaksa was sworn in as the Prime Minister of Sri Lanka for the fourth time on 9 August 2020 at Kelaniya Temple on the outskirts of Colombo.

== International reactions ==
=== Nations ===
- India – Indian Prime Minister Narendra Modi phoned Mahinda Rajapaksa and congratulated his party for the election win.
- United States – The US embassy issued a statement congratulating the SLPP for their victory and praised the smooth as well as peaceful conduct of the election.
- Vietnam – Vietnamese Prime Minister Nguyễn Xuân Phúc congratulated Mahinda Rajapaksa.
- Nepal – Nepali Prime Minister KP Sharma Oli congratulated Mahinda Rajapaksa.
- Maldives – Maldivian President Ibrahim Mohamed Solih congratulated Mahinda Rajapaksa.
- Bangladesh – Prime Minister of Bangladesh Sheikh Hasina congratulated Mahinda Rajapaksa.
- Russia – Russian Prime Minister Mikhail Mishustin congratulated Mahinda Rajapaksa.
- Singapore – Singaporean Prime Minister Lee Hsien Loong congratulated Mahinda Rajapaksa.
- Iran – Iranian President Hassan Rouhani congratulated Mahinda Rajapaksa.
