= Tamil National People's Front =

Tamil National People's Front தமிழ் தேசியத்திற்கான மக்கள் முன்னணி ද්‍රවිඩ ජාතික ජනතා පෙරමුණ
- President: Gajendrakumar Ponnambalam
- Secretary-General: S. Kajendren
- Vice President: R. E. Anandaraja; Rajakon Hariharan; Visvalingam Manivannan; Gajendrakumar Ponnambalam; P. Sithamparanathan
- Founder: Gajendrakumar Ponnambalam
- Founded: 28 February 2010
- Split from: Tamil National Alliance
- Headquarters: 43, 3rd Cross Street, Jaffna, Sri Lanka
- Ideology: Tamil nationalism Regionalism; Secularism
- Colors: Yellow
- Parliament of Sri Lanka: 1 / 225
- Local Government: 101 / 8,793

Website
- www.tnpf.info

The Tamil National People's Front (TNPF) is a Sri Lankan political alliance which represents the Sri Lankan Tamil ethnic minority in the country. It was launched on 28 February 2010 as breakaway faction of the Tamil National Alliance (TNA). Its main constituent is the All Ceylon Tamil Congress and it also includes former TNA Jaffna district MPs Selvarajah Kajendren and Pathmini Sithamparanathan.

It contests under the Ideology of "Two-Nations in One Country" meaning Sri Lankan State as the country comprising the Sinhala nation and the Tamil nation in a pluri-national society and supports Federalism as a model to achieve this goal. But diverges from the TNA in that the TNPF does not agree on the devolutionary path to federalism. It also opposes both the concept of Sri Lankan nation state and the concept of a Sinhala State.

== 2010 Parliamentary General Election ==
In the 8 April 2010 parliamentary election in which the United People's Freedom Alliance led by President Rajapaksa retained power, the Tamil National People's Front led by Gajendrakumar Ponnambalam won 0.09% of the popular vote and no seats in the Sri Lankan parliament.

Votes and seats won by TNPF by electoral district

Electoral District	Votes	%	Seats	Turnout	TNPF MPs
Jaffna	6,362	4.28%	0	23.33%	
Trincomalee	1,182	0.85%	0	62.20%	
Total	7,544	0.09%	0	61.26%	
Source:"Parliamentary General Election – 2010". Department of Elections, Sri Lanka.
