= 2001 Sri Lankan parliamentary election =

← 2000	5 December 2001	2004 →

All 225 seats in the Parliament of Sri Lanka 113 seats were needed for a majority
- Turnout: 76.03%
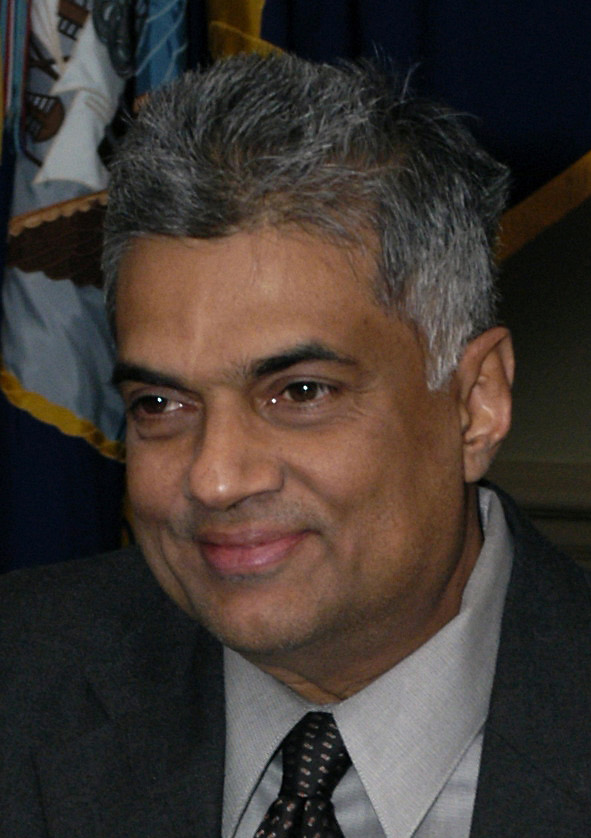

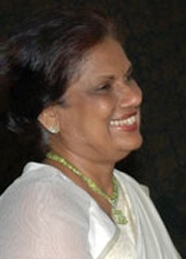

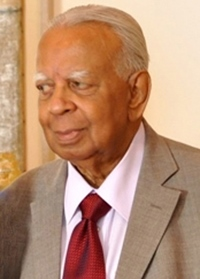
	First party	Second party
Leader	Ranil Wickremesinghe	Chandrika Kumaratunga
Party	UNF	PA
Leader since	1994	1994
Leader's seat	Colombo District	n/a
Last election	40.22%, 89 seats	45.11%, 107 seats
Seats won	109	77
Seat change	▲20	▼30
Popular vote	4,086,026	3,330,815
Percentage	45.62%	37.19%
Swing	▲5.40%	▼7.92%
	Third party	Fourth party
	JVP
Leader	Somawansa Amarasinghe	Rajavarothiam Sampanthan
Party	JVP	TNA
Leader since	1990	2001
Leader's seat	n/a	Trincomalee District
Last election	6.00%, 10 seats	Did not exist
Seats won	16	15
Seat change	▲6	New party
Popular vote	815,353	348,164
Percentage	9.10%	3.89%
Swing	▲3.10%	New party
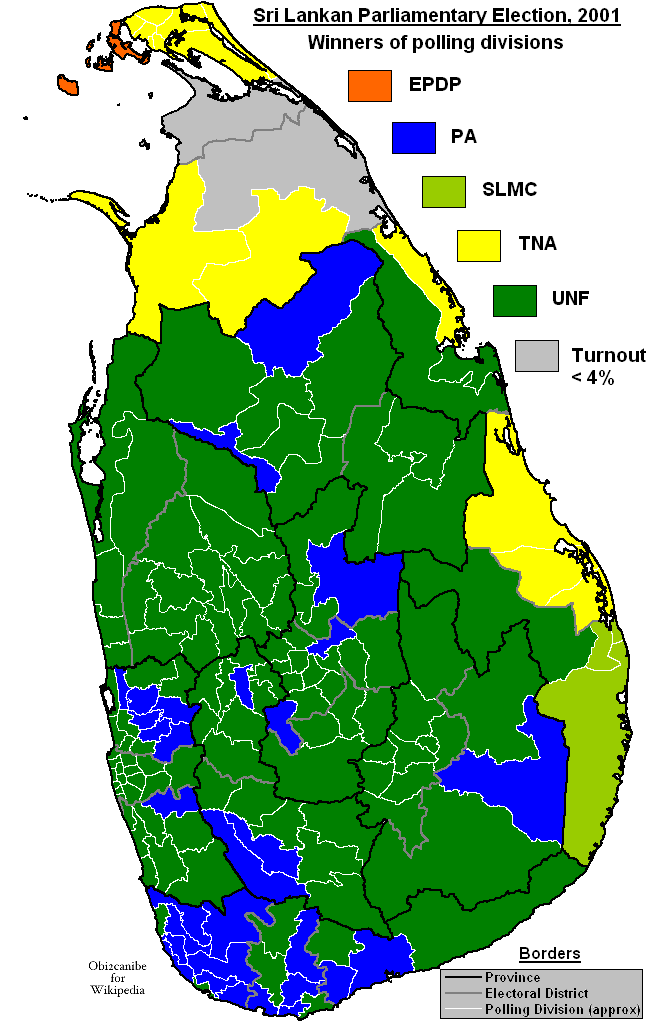
- Winners of polling divisions. UNF in green and PA in blue.
Prime Minister before election
Ratnasiri Wickremanayake
People's Alliance
Prime Minister-designate
Ranil Wickremesinghe
United National Front

Parliamentary elections were held in Sri Lanka on 5 December 2001, just a little over a year after the previous elections in October 2000.

== Background ==
The People's Alliance (PA) government faced a blow when most of the SLMC MPs left the coalition. President Chandrika Kumaratunga tried to recruit the JVP to replace it, but this angered several PA MPs, thirteen of which defected to the opposition. A no-confidence motion was prepared; to forestall this, Kumaratunga called the election.

More than 1,300 incidents of election violence were reported during the campaign. Prime Minister Ratnasiri Wickremanayake was nearly killed by a suicide bomber. Overall, 60 people were killed in election-related violence, including 14 on polling day.

== Parties ==
- Democratic People's Liberation Front (DFLP)
- Eelam People's Democratic Party (EPDP)
- People's Alliance (Bahejana Nidasa Pakhsaya, BNP), which consisted of:
  - Communist Party of Sri Lanka
  - Democratic United National Front
  - Lanka Sama Samaja Party (Sri Lanka Equal Society Party, LSSP)
  - Sri Lanka Freedom Party (Sri Lanka Nidahas Pakshaya, SLNP)
  - Sri Lanka Mahajana Pakshaya (Sri Lanka People's Party, SLMP)
- Janatha Vimukthi Peramuna (People's Liberation Front, JVP)
- Sri Lanka Muslim Congress
- Tamil United Liberation Front (Tamil Vimuktasi Peramuna, TVP)
- United National Front, which consisted of:
  - United National Party (Eksath Jathika Pakshaya, UNP)
  - Ceylon Workers Congress (CWC)

== Results ==
The ruling People's Alliance lost the election, which saw the United National Front win the legislative power. UNP leader Ranil Wickremesinghe became the new prime minister.

Having the President and Prime Minister belong to two different parties proved to be unstable, and Parliament was dissolved again in 2004, leading to yet another general election.

Party	Votes	%	Seats		
Party	Votes	%	District	National	Total
United National Front (Note: Contested under the name and symbol of the United National Party. Also consisted of the Ceylon Workers' Congress, the Democratic People's Front, the Sri Lanka Muslim Congress (except in Ampara, Batticaloa and Jaffna, where it ran alone), the United National Party and the Up-Country People's Front.)	4,086,026	45.62	96	13	109
People's Alliance (Note: Consisting of the Communist Party of Sri Lanka, the Desha Vimukthi Janatha Party, the Lanka Sama Samaja Party, Mahajana Eksath Peramuna, the*National Unity Alliance, the Sri Lanka Freedom Party and Sri Lanka Mahajana Pakshaya.)	3,330,815	37.19	66	11	77
Janatha Vimukthi Peramuna	815,353	9.10	13	3	16
Tamil National Alliance (Note: Contested under the name and symbol of Tamil United Liberation Front. Also consisted of the All Ceylon Tamil Congress, the Eelam People's Revolutionary Liberation Front and the Tamil Eelam Liberation Organization.)	348,164	3.89	14	1	15
Sri Lanka Muslim Congress	105,346	1.18	4	1	5
Eelam People's Democratic Party	72,783	0.81	2	0	2
Sinhala Heritage	50,665	0.57	0	0	0
New Left Front	45,901	0.51	0	0	0
Democratic People's Liberation Front	16,669	0.19	1	0	1
United Socialist Party	9,455	0.11	0	0	0
National Democratic Party	6,952	0.08	0	0	0
Democratic Left Front	6,214	0.07	0	0	0
United Lalith Front	3,851	0.04	0	0	0
Eksath Sinhala Maha Sabha	2,771	0.03	0	0	0
Muslim United Liberation Front	2,644	0.03	0	0	0
Motherland People's Party	1,630	0.02	0	0	0
Jathika Sangwardhena Peramuna	1,624	0.02	0	0	0
Bahujana Nidahas Peramuna	1,361	0.02	0	0	0
Liberal Party	1,152	0.01	0	0	0
Ruhunu Janatha Party	1,089	0.01	0	0	0
Democratic United National Front	978	0.01	0	0	0
Sri Lanka Progressive Front	854	0.01	0	0	0
Sri Lanka Muslim Katchi	802	0.01	0	0	0
Sri Lanka National Front	719	0.01	0	0	0
Socialist Equality Party	243	0.00	0	0	0
Eksath Lanka Podujana Pakshaya	56	0.00	0	0	0
Independents	41,752	0.47	0	0	0
Total	8,955,869	100.00	196	29	225
Valid votes	8,955,869	94.77			
Invalid/blank votes	493,944	5.23			
Total votes	9,449,813	100.00			
Registered voters/turnout	12,428,762	76.03			
Source: Election Commission
