= 2004 Sri Lankan parliamentary election =

Election

← 2001	2 April 2004	2010 →

All 225 seats in the Parliament of Sri Lanka 113 seats were needed for a majority
- Turnout: 75.96%
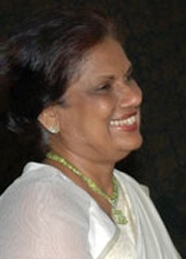

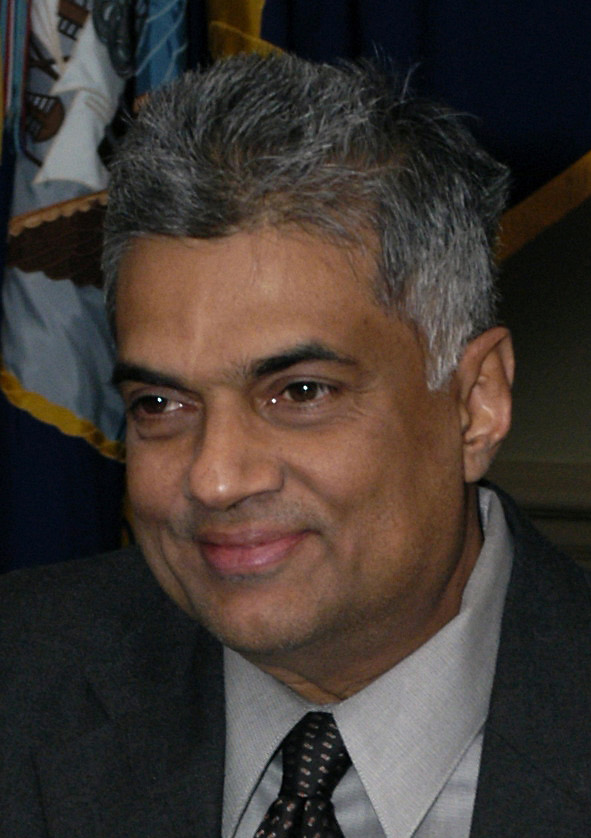
	First party	Second party
Leader	Chandrika Kumaratunga	Ranil Wickremesinghe
Party	UPFA	United National Front
Leader since	1994	1994
Leader's seat	n/a	Colombo District
Last election	37.20%, 77 seats (Note: As People's Alliance)	45.60%, 109 seats
Seats won	105	82
Seat change	▲12	▼27
Popular vote	4,223,970	3,504,200
Percentage	45.60%	37.83%
Swing	▼0.01%	▼7.73%
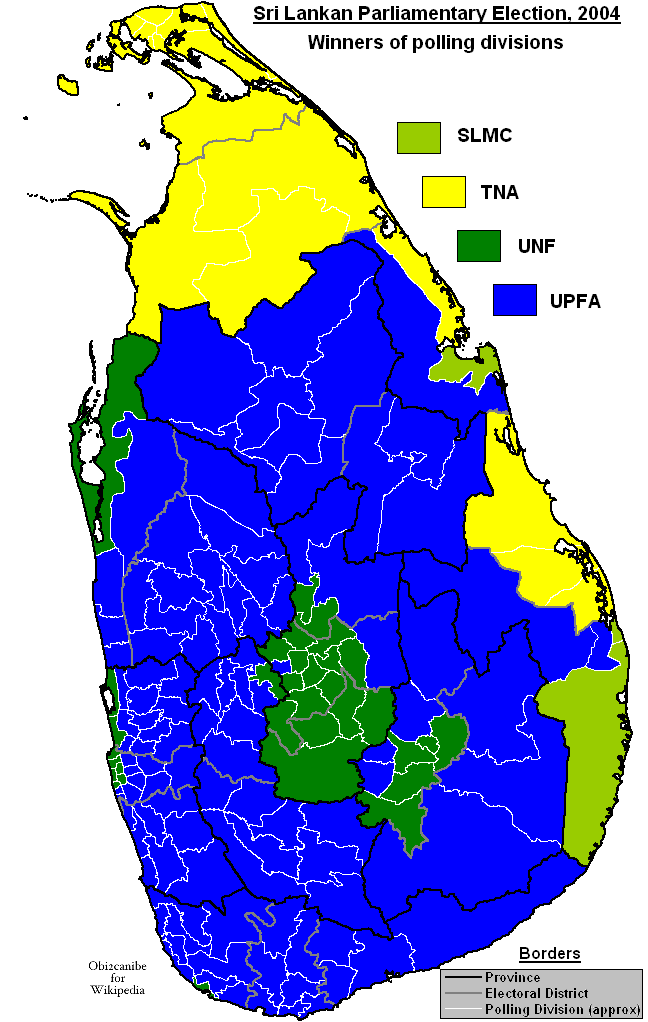
- Winners of polling divisions. UPFA in blue and UNF in green.
Prime Minister before election
Ranil Wickremesinghe
United National Front
Prime Minister-designate
Mahinda Rajapaksa
UPFA

Parliamentary elections were held in Sri Lanka on 2 April 2004. The ruling United National Party of Prime Minister Ranil Wickremesinghe was defeated, winning only eighty two seats in the 225-member Sri Lankan parliament. The opposition United People's Freedom Alliance won 105 seats. While this was eight seats short of an absolute majority, the Alliance was able to form a government.

On 6 April, President Chandrika Kumaratunga appointed former Minister of Labour Mahinda Rajapaksa as Prime Minister.

== Parties ==
The United People's Freedom Alliance was formed as an alliance between President Kumaratunga's party, the Sri Lanka Freedom Party (SLFP), and the leftist Janatha Vimukthi Peramuna. Other parties that belong to the People's Alliance, such as the Communist Party of Sri Lanka, the Democratic United National Front, the Lanka Sama Samaja Party, Mahajana Eksath Peramuna and the Sri Lanka Mahajana Pakshaya, later joined UPFA.

In the 2001 elections, the People's Alliance and Janatha Vimukthi Peramuna had fought separately. Then the JVP won 9.1% of the vote and sixteen seats. At this election it is reported than as many as thirty nine JVP members won seats as UPFA candidates.

The runner-up in the election was the United National Front (UNF), the front led by the United National Party. In addition to the UNP, the UNF also had candidates from minor parties such as Ceylon Workers Congress.

Other parties winning seats were the Buddhist, Sinhala nationalist outfit Jathika Hela Urumaya (JHU), the pro-LTTE alliance Tamil National Alliance (TNA), the Sri Lanka Muslim Congress (SLMC) and the Eelam People's Democratic Party (EPDP). The Democratic Peoples Liberation Front (the political wing of PLOTE) lost their parliamentary representation.

== Campaign ==
Prime Minister Ranil Wickremasinghe's UNF government had been in limbo since October 2003, when President Kumaratunga declared a state of emergency and took three key cabinet portfolios for her party. During the campaign, she argued that Wickremasinghe had been too soft on the Liberation Tigers of Tamil Eelam and promised to take a harder line. The UNF, for its part, stressed the economic gains that had been made with the ceasefire and the need to find a negotiated solution to the civil war.

== Voting ==
Polling booths opened at 07:00 local time and remained open until 16:00 (01:00 to 10:00 UTC). A total of 10,670 polling stations were installed to receive votes from 12.9 million eligible voters. Voter turnout was high, at around 75%.

The backdrop to polling day was tense, with continued guerrilla activity by Tamil Tiger separatists and five politically motivated murders in the run-up to the election. However, except for a slightly lower turnout in the Eastern Province, Sri Lanka and allegations of fraud in the North, the election was calm and orderly.

Sri Lanka's Elections Commissioner Dayananda Dissanayake said that despite reported cases of electoral malpractice in certain polling stations in six electoral districts, there would be no fresh elections in these areas and the results issued by the Commission were final.

== Results ==
The United People's Freedom Alliance vote and seat totals are compared with the combined People's Alliance and JVP vote and seat counts at the 2001 election.

Party	Votes	%	Seats		
Party	Votes	%	District	National	Total
United People's Freedom Alliance (Note: Included the Communist Party of Sri Lanka, the Desha Vimukthi Janatha Party, Janatha Vimukthi Peramuna, the Lanka Sama Samaja Party, Mahajana Eksath Peramuna, the National Muslim Congress, the National Unity Alliance, the Sri Lanka Freedom Party and Sri Lanka Mahajana Pakshaya.)	4,223,970	45.60	92	13	105
United National Front (Note: Contested under the name and symbol of the United National Party. Also consisted of the Ceylon Workers' Congress, the Democratic People's Front and the Sri Lanka Muslim Congress (which contested separately in Ampara, Batticaloa, Jaffna and Trincomalee).)	3,504,200	37.83	71	11	82
Tamil National Alliance (Note: Contested under the name and symbol of Illankai Tamil Arasu Kachchi. Also consisted of the All Ceylon Tamil Congress, the Eelam People's Revolutionary Liberation Front and the Tamil Eelam Liberation Organization.)	633,654	6.84	20	2	22
Jathika Hela Urumaya	552,724	5.97	7	2	9
Sri Lanka Muslim Congress	186,876	2.02	4	1	5
Up-Country People's Front	49,728	0.54	1	0	1
Eelam People's Democratic Party	24,955	0.27	1	0	1
National Development Front	14,956	0.16	0	0	0
United Socialist Party	14,660	0.16	0	0	0
Ceylon Democratic Unity Alliance	10,736	0.12	0	0	0
New Left Front	8,461	0.09	0	0	0
Democratic People's Liberation Front (Note: Including the People's Liberation Organisation of Tamil Eelam.)	7,326	0.08	0	0	0
United Muslim People's Alliance	3,779	0.04	0	0	0
United Lalith Front	3,773	0.04	0	0	0
National People's Party	1,540	0.02	0	0	0
Sinhalaye Mahasammatha Bhoomiputra Pakshaya	1,401	0.02	0	0	0
Swarajya	1,136	0.01	0	0	0
Sri Lanka Progressive Front	814	0.01	0	0	0
Ruhuna People's Party	590	0.01	0	0	0
Sri Lanka National Front	493	0.01	0	0	0
Liberal Party of Sri Lanka	413	0.00	0	0	0
Sri Lanka Muslim Party	382	0.00	0	0	0
Socialist Equality Party	159	0.00	0	0	0
Democratic United National Front	141	0.00	0	0	0
Independents	15,865	0.17	0	0	0
Total	9,262,732	100.00	196	29	225
Valid votes	9,262,732	94.54			
Invalid/blank votes	534,948	5.46			
Total votes	9,797,680	100.00			
Registered voters/turnout	12,899,139	75.96			

=== By electoral district ===
District	UNP	UPFA	Other	Valid Votes
Colombo	441,841 (41.8%); 9 seats	414,688 (39.2%); 8 seats	JHU: 190,618 (18.0%); 3 seats	1,057,966
Gampaha	367,572 (37.1%); 6 seats	509,963 (51.5%); 9 seats	JHU: 102,516 (19.4%); 2 seats	990,002
Kaluthara	212,721 (37.8%); 3 seats	291,208 (51.7%); 6 seats	JHU: 56,615 (10.1); 1 seat	563,019
Kandy	313,859 (50.0%); 6 seats	268,131 (42.7%); 5 seats	JHU: 42,192 (6.7%); 1 seat	627,866
Matale	100,642 (45.7%); 2 seats	108,259 (49.2%); 3 seats	JHU: 8,819 (4.0%)	220,062
Nuwara-Eliya	176,971 (54.0%); 4 seats	82,945 (25.3%); 2 seats	JHU: 4,454 (1.4%); Other: 63,239 (19.3%); 1 seat	327,609
Galle	209,399 (38.7%); 4 seats	306,385 (56.6%); 6 seats	JHU: 22,826 (4.2%)	541,511
Matara	139,633 (34.9%); 3 seats	241,235 (60.3%); 5 seats	JHU: 16,229 (4.0%)	400,233
Hambantota	98,877 (35.4%); 2 seats	178,895 (64.0); 5 seats	JHU: 1,538 (0.5%)	279,310
Jaffna	-	-	ITAK: 257,320 (90.6%); 8 seats EPDP: 18,612 (6.5%); 1 seat SLMC: 1,995 (0.7%)	284,026
Vanni	16,213 (13.4%); 1 seat	6,415 (05.3%)	ITAK: 90,252 (74.7%); 5 seats DPLF: 6,028 (4.99%); EPDP: 1,084 (0.9%)	120,848
Batticaloa	6,151 (2.5%)	26,268 (10.9%)	ITAK: 161,011 (66.7%); 4 seats SLMC: 43,131 (17.9%); 1 seat	241,375
Digamadulla	42,121 (14.5%); 1 seat	111,747 (38.5%); 3 seats	SLMC: 76,563 (26.4%); 2 seats ITAK: 55,533 (19.1%); 1 seat EPDP: 1,611 (0.5%); JHU: 1,130 (0.4%)	290,361
Trincomalee	15,693 (8.6%)	31,053 (17.0%); 1 seat	ITAK: 68,955 (37.7%); 2 seats SLMC: 65,187 (35.7%); 1 seat JHU: 791 (0.4%); EPDP: 540 (0.3%)	182,794
Kurunegala	340,768 (42.9%); 7 seats	412,157 (51.9%); 9 seats	JHU: 37,459 (4.7%)	793,647
Puttalam	135,152 (46.6%); 3 seats	142,784 (49.3%); 5 seats	JHU: 10,000 (3.4%)	289,763
Anuradhapura	148,612 (39.9%); 3 seats	212,943 (57.2%); 5 seats	JHU: 8,034 (2.2%)	372,125
Polonnaruwa	75,664 (40.8%); 2 seats	106,243 (57.3%); 3 seats	JHU: 2,413 (1.3%)	185,261
Badulla	181,705 (49.1%); 5 seats	178,634 (48.3%); 3 seats	JHU: 6,932 (1.9%)	370,178
Monaragala	71,067 (37.0); 2 seats	117,456 (61.1%); 3 seats	JHU: 2,675 (1.4%)	192,113
Ratnapura	205,490 (41.8%); 4 seats	261,450 (53.1%); 6 seats	JHU: 20,801 (4.2%)	492,003
Kegalle	186,641 (44.3%); 4 seats	214,267 (50.9%); 5 seats	JHU: 18,034 (4.3%)	421,131
