= 2015 Sri Lankan parliamentary election =

2015 elections to the Sri Lankan legislature

- 17 August 2015

All 225 seats in Parliament 113 seats needed for a majority
- Turnout: 77.66%
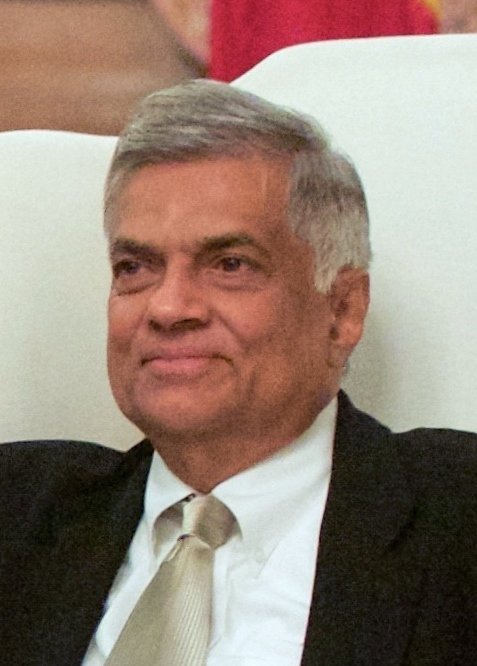

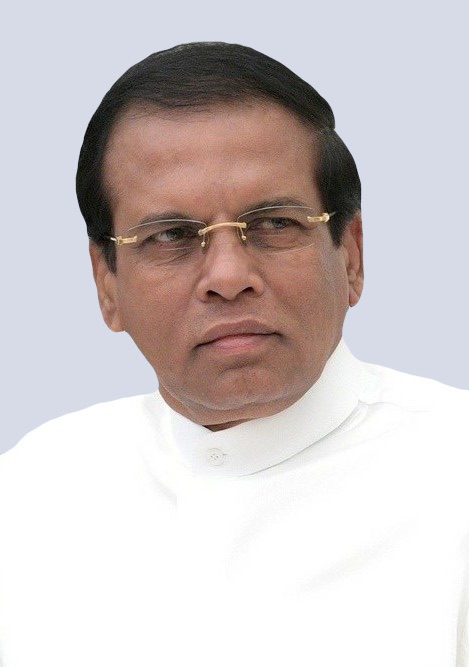

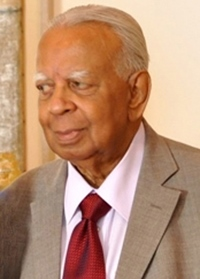

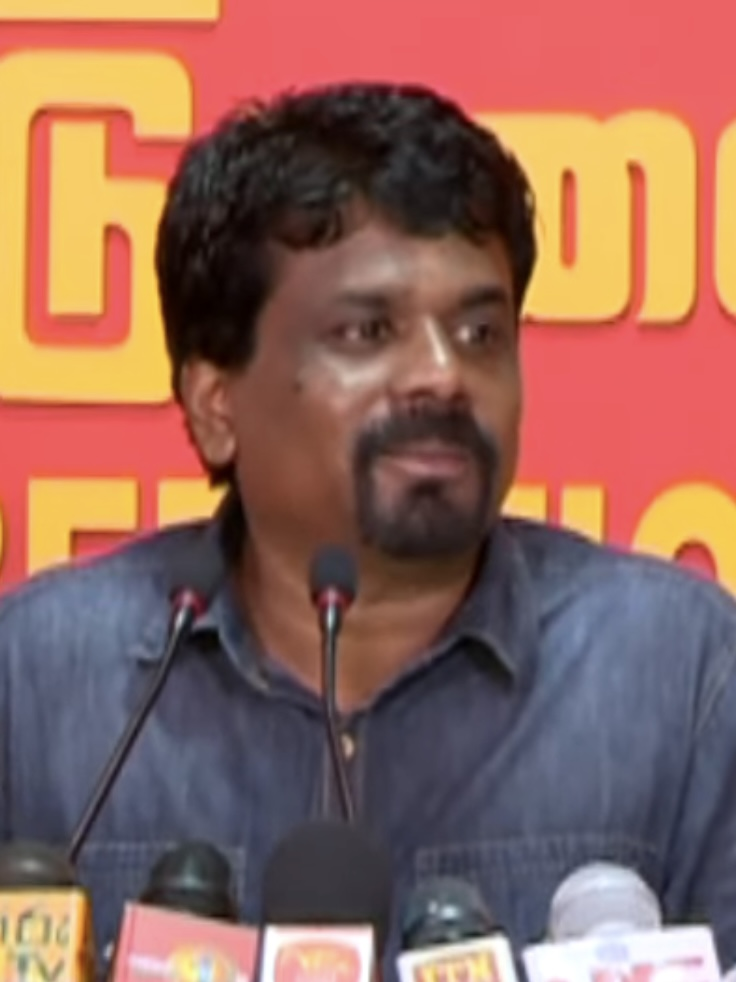
	First party	Second party
Leader	Ranil Wickremesinghe	Maithripala Sirisena (Note: President Sirisena was the nominal leader of the UPFA. Most members of the alliance remained loyal to former President Mahinda Rajapaksa.)
Party	UNFGG	UPFA
Last election	29.34%, 60 seats (Note: Represents seats won by the now defunct United National Front (UNF) at the 2010 parliamentary election. The UNFGG consists of most of the members of the UNF in 2010 (Democratic People's Front, National Union of Workers, Sri Lanka Muslim Congress and United National Party) and some the members of the UPFA in 2010 (All Ceylon Makkal Congress, Jathika Hela Urumaya, United Left Front and Up-Country People's Front).)	60.33%, 144 seats
Seats won	106	95
Seat change	▲46	▼49
Popular vote	5,098,916	4,732,664
Percentage	45.66%	42.38%
Swing	▲16.32pp	▼17.95pp
	Third party	Fourth party
Leader	R. Sampanthan	Anura Kumara Dissanayake
Party	TNA	JVP
Last election	2.90%, 14 seats	5.49%, 4 seats
Seats won	16	6
Seat change	▲2	▲2
Popular vote	515,963	543,944
Percentage	4.62%	4.87%
Swing	▲1.72pp	▼0.62pp
- Results by polling division UNFGG UPFA TNA
Prime Minister before election
Ranil Wickremesinghe
UNF
Prime Minister after election
Ranil Wickremesinghe
UNFGG

Parliamentary elections were held in Sri Lanka on 17 August 2015, ten months ahead of schedule, to elect 225 members to Sri Lanka's 15th Parliament.

The United National Party (UNP) led United National Front for Good Governance (UNFGG) won 106 seats, an increase of 46 since the 2010 election, but failed to secure a majority in Parliament. The United People's Freedom Alliance (UPFA) won 95 seats, a decline of 49. The Tamil National Alliance (TNA), the largest party representing Sri Lankan Tamils, won 16 seats, an increase of two from 2010. The remaining eight seats were won by Janatha Vimukthi Peramuna (6), Sri Lanka Muslim Congress (1) and Eelam People's Democratic Party (1).

Prime Minister Ranil Wickremesinghe, leader of the UNFGG and UNP, was able to form a national government with the support of UPFA MPs loyal to President Maithripala Sirisena.

== Background ==
The last parliamentary election was held in April 2010. The incumbent United People's Freedom Alliance (UPFA), buoyed by the military defeat of the rebel Liberation Tigers of Tamil Eelam, won a landslide victory, securing 144 seats in the legislature. In September 2010 the UPFA, with the support of some opposition MPs, passed the eighteenth amendment to the constitution, increasing the powers of President Mahinda Rajapaksa, leader of the UPFA, and removing the two term limit on the presidency. The UPFA was also able to impeach the chief justice, allowing Rajapaksa to appoint an ally as chief justice.

In November 2014 Rajapaksa called a presidential election, two years ahead of schedule, seeking an unprecedented third term. In a surprise move Maithripala Sirisena, Rajapaksa's Minister of Health, was put up as the common opposition candidate. At the election in January 2015 Sirisena inflicted a shock defeat on Rajapaksa. Sirisena subsequently formed a government dominated by the opposition United National Party (UNP). In March 2015 Sirisena formed a national government by appointing ministers from the Sri Lanka Freedom Party, the main constituent of the UPFA.

In his election manifesto Sirisena had promised a 100-day reform program after which parliament would be dissolved on 23 April 2015. However, Srisena and his government faced opposition from a large contingent of legislators loyal to Rajapaksa, and, although some reforms, such as the curtailing of presidential powers and re-introducing the two term limit, were introduced by the passing of the nineteenth amendment, others, notably electoral reforms, were not carried out. With electoral reforms stalled and the 100-day reform program falling behind schedule, the UNP started calling for parliamentary elections. Sirisena dissolved parliament on 26 June 2015.

== Electoral system ==
196 MPs were elected from 22 multi-member electoral districts using the D'Hondt method with an open list, a proportional representation system. The remaining 29 seats were allocated to contesting parties and independent groups in proportion to their share of the national vote.

== Details ==
Nominations took place between 6 July 2015 and 13 July 2015. Postal voting took place on 5 August 2015 and 6 August 2015 except for school teachers who cast their postal votes on 3 August 2015. The date of the election was set for 17 August 2015. 15,044,490 Sri Lankans were eligible to vote at the election. 12,314 polling stations and 1,600 counting centres were used. Nearly 200,000 state employees and over 70,000 police officers were deployed on election duties.

The new parliament is expected to meet on 1 September 2015.

== Contesting parties ==
A total of 6,151 candidates from 21 registered political parties (3,653) and 201 independent groups (2,498) competed for the 196 district seats. The nominations of 12 registered political parties and 24 independent groups were rejected. The UPFA, United National Front for Good Governance and Janatha Vimukthi Peramuna (JVP) contested in all 22 electoral districts.

=== United People's Freedom Alliance ===
The ruling UPFA suffered a series of defections to the opposition during the 2015 presidential election. After the election the UPFA and its main constituent, the Sri Lanka Freedom Party (SLFP), pledged support for newly elected President Sirisena's reform program. Sirisena became chairman/leader of the SLFP on 16 January 2015 and of the UPFA on 14 March 2015. However, large sections of the UPFA/SLFP remained loyal to former President Rajapaksa. They called for Rajapaksa to be made the UPFA's prime ministerial candidate at the forthcoming parliamentary election. This alarmed those members of the UPFA/SLPF who had supported Sirisena during the presidential election. They urged Sirisena to prevent Rajapaksa's return to politics but Sirisena remained silent on the matter. After the parliamentary election was called it was announced that Rajapaksa would contest but not as the prime ministerial candidate which would be decided after the election. Feeling "betrayed" by Sirisena, his supporters in the UPFA/SLFP allied themselves with the UNP to form the United National Front for Good Governance.

=== United National Front for Good Governance ===
The UNP had contested past parliamentary elections in alliance with smaller parties representing ethnic minorities but many of these had defected to the UPFA after the election. Prior to this election being called the UNP had claimed it would contest the election on its own. However, after the election had been called it started forming alliances with minority parties including the Sri Lanka Muslim Congress (SLMC) and Tamil Progressive Alliance (TPA). On 12 July 2015 the UNP, SLMC and TPA signed agreements with the Jathika Hela Urumaya (JHU) and anti-Rajapaksa members of the SLFP to form the United National Front for Good Governance (UNFGG) to contest the election. The All Ceylon Makkal Congress (ACMC) also contested with the UNFGG. The UNFGG is believed to have had the tacit support of President Sirisena but officially he has pledged to be neutral.

The UNFGG had originally been established by the renaming of the JHU after it left the UPFA. It was registered as a political party with the diamond symbol. Despite this the UNFGG contested the election under the name and elephant symbol of the UNP. UNFGG general-secretary Champika Ranawaka has stated that the JHU name and its conch symbol will be revived after the election.

=== Other parties ===
The Tamil National Alliance, the largest party representing the Sri Lankan Tamils, contested in the five electoral districts in the north and east and was aiming to win 20 seats. The JVP, which had contested the two previous parliamentary elections in alliances, contested this election on its own. Sarath Fonseka's Democratic Party contested in all but three electoral districts.

The SLMC, despite being a member of the UNFGG, contested on its own in two electoral districts. Similarly, the ACMC contested on its own in one electoral district. The Ceylon Workers' Congress, a member of the UPFA, contested on its own in three electoral districts.

The Sinhalese Buddhist nationalist Bodu Bala Sena allied with the United Lanka Great Council (Eksath Lanka Maha Sabha) to contest as the Buddhist People's Front (Bodu Jana Peramuna) in 16 electoral districts.

== Violence and violations of election laws ==
Thushara Devalegama, a UNP supporter, was attacked and killed by an unidentified group on 29 June 2015 in Nivithigala, Ratnapura District. Two people (Siththi Maheema and Bulathsinghalalage Niroshan Sampath) were killed and around dozen others injured when gunmen arriving in two vehicles opened fire into a crowd attending an election rally for UNP candidate Ravi Karunanayake at Kotahena on 31 July 2015. According to the police the incident was a clash between rival underworld gangs. Jamaldeen Ameer, a supporter of UNFGG candidate Ali Ameer, was shot dead by two gunmen in Oddamavadi, Valaichchenai on 15 August 2015.

Election monitors received 1,500 complaints of assaults, misuse of state resources and other violations of election laws and over 700 were arrested for election-related offences.

== Results ==
The UNFGG became the largest group in Parliament after securing 45.66% of votes and 106 seats whilst the UPFA won 42.38% of votes and 95 seats. Rajapaksa quickly conceded defeat in his attempt to become prime minister.

The result left the UNFGG seven seats short of a majority in Parliament. However, on 20 August 2015 the central committee of the SLFP agreed to form a national government with the UNP for two years. Wickremesinghe was sworn in as prime minister on 21 August 2015. Immediately afterwards a memorandum of understanding to work together in Parliament was signed by acting SLFP general secretary Duminda Dissanayake and UNP general secretary Kabir Hashim.

Winners of electoral districts

Party	Votes	%	Seats		
Party	Votes	%	District	National	Total
United National Front for Good Governance (Note: The UNFGG contested under the name and symbol of UNP. The alliance consisted of the All Ceylon Makkal Congress(which contested separately in one district, Ampara), the Democratic National Movement, Jathika Hela Urumaya, the Muslim Tamil National Alliance, the National Front for Good Governance, the Sri Lanka Muslim Congress (which contested separately in two districts, Batticaloa and Vanni), the Tamil Progressive Alliance (the Democratic People's Front, the National Union of Workers and the Up-Country People's Front), the United Left Front and the United National Party.)	5,098,916	45.66	93	13	106
United People's Freedom Alliance (Note: Consisting of the Ceylon Workers' Congress (which contested separately in three districts, Badulla, Kandy and Kegalle), the Citizen's Front (which contested separately in two districts, Nuwara Eliya and Vanni), the Democratic National Front, the Democratic People's Congress, the Liberal Party (which contested separately in four districts, Colombo, Galle, Kurunegala and Matara), Mahajana Eksath Peramuna, the National Congress, the National Freedom Front, Pivithuru Hela Urumaya, the Socialist Alliance (the Communist Party of Sri Lanka, Democratic Left Front, Lanka Sama Samaja Party, National Liberation People's Party and Sri Lanka People's Party), the Sri Lanka Freedom Party, Tamil Makkal Viduthalai Pulikal and the United Citizens’ Front.)	4,732,664	42.38	83	12	95
Janatha Vimukthi Peramuna	544,154	4.87	4	2	6
Tamil National Alliance (Note: The TNA contested under the name and symbol of Illankai Tamil Arasu Kachchi. It consisted of the Eelam People's Revolutionary Liberation Front, Illankai Tamil Arasu Kachchi, the People's Liberation Organisation of Tamil Eelam and the Tamil Eelam Liberation Organization.)	515,963	4.62	14	2	16
Sri Lanka Muslim Congress	44,193	0.40	1	0	1
Eelam People's Democratic Party	33,481	0.30	1	0	1
All Ceylon Makkal Congress	33,102	0.30	0	0	0
Democratic Party	28,587	0.26	0	0	0
Buddhist People's Front (Note: Bodu Bala Sena and the United Lanka Great Council)	20,377	0.18	0	0	0
Tamil National People's Front (Note: Contested under the name and symbol of the All Ceylon Tamil Congress.)	18,644	0.17	0	0	0
Ceylon Workers' Congress	17,107	0.15	0	0	0
Frontline Socialist Party	7,349	0.07	0	0	0
United People's Party	5,353	0.05	0	0	0
Puravesi Peramuna	4,272	0.04	0	0	0
Tamil United Liberation Front	4,173	0.04	0	0	0
Eelavar Democratic Front	3,173	0.03	0	0	0
Our National Front	2,868	0.03	0	0	0
United Socialist Party	1,895	0.02	0	0	0
Jana Setha Peramuna	1,728	0.02	0	0	0
Akhila Ilankai Tamil Mahasabha	1,628	0.01	0	0	0
Okkoma Wasiyo Okkoma Rajawaru Sanvidanaya	700	0.01	0	0	0
Nawa Sama Samaja Party	644	0.01	0	0	0
Sri Lanka Mahajana Pakshaya	626	0.01	0	0	0
New Sinhala Heritage	502	0.00	0	0	0
United Peace Front	488	0.00	0	0	0
Eksath Lanka Podujana Pakshaya	454	0.00	0	0	0
Maubima Janatha Pakshaya	352	0.00	0	0	0
Socialist Equality Party	321	0.00	0	0	0
Sri Lanka National Force	236	0.00	0	0	0
Liberal Party	118	0.00	0	0	0
Democratic Unity Alliance	98	0.00	0	0	0
Sri Lanka Labour Party	62	0.00	0	0	0
Sri Lanka Vanguard Party	49	0.00	0	0	0
Democratic National Movement	47	0.00	0	0	0
Muslim National Alliance	33	0.00	0	0	0
Independents	42,828	0.38	0	0	0
Total	11,167,185	100.00	196	29	225
Valid votes	11,167,185	95.58			
Invalid/blank votes	516,926	4.42			
Total votes	11,684,111	100.00			
Registered voters/turnout	15,044,490	77.66			
Source: Election Commission, Election Commission

=== By district ===
Districts won by UNFGG
Districts won by UPFA
Districts won by TNA

District results for the 2015 Sri Lankan parliamentary election
Province	Electoral District	UNFGG			UPFA			TNA			JVP			Others			Total			Turnout
Province	Electoral District	Votes	%	Seats	Votes	%	Seats	Votes	%	Seats	Votes	%	Seats	Votes	%	Seats	Votes	%	Seats	Turnout
Western	Colombo	640,743	53.00%	11	474,063	39.21%	7	-	-	-	81,391	6.73%	1	12,702	1.05%	0	1,208,899	100.00%	19	78.93%
Western	Gampaha	577,004	47.13%	9	549,958	44.92%	8	-	-	-	87,880	7.18%	1	9,559	0.78%	0	1,224,401	100.00%	18	78.21%
Western	Kalutara	310,234	44.47%	4	338,801	48.56%	5	-	-	-	38,475	5.52%	1	10,125	1.45%	0	697,635	100.00%	10	80.13%
Central	Kandy	440,761	55.57%	7	309,152	38.98%	5	-	-	-	30,669	3.87%	0	12,518	1.58%	0	793,100	100.00%	12	79.13%
Central	Matale	138,241	49.84%	3	126,315	45.54%	2	-	-	-	10,947	3.95%	0	1,877	0.68%	0	277,380	100.00%	5	78.73%
Central	Nuwara Eliya	228,920	59.01%	5	147,348	37.98%	3	-	-	-	5,590	1.44%	0	6,088	1.57%	0	387,946	100.00%	8	78.77%
Southern	Galle	265,180	42.48%	4	312,518	50.07%	6	-	-	-	37,778	6.05%	0	8,735	1.40%	0	624,211	100.00%	10	78.00%
Southern	Matara	186,675	39.08%	3	250,505	52.44%	5	-	-	-	35,270	7.38%	0	5,267	1.10%	0	477,717	100.00%	8	78.61%
Southern	Hambantota	130,433	35.65%	2	196,980	53.84%	4	-	-	-	36,527	9.98%	1	1,889	0.52%	0	365,829	100.00%	7	81.20%
Northern	Jaffna	20,025	6.67%	1	17,309	5.76%	0	207,577	69.12%	5	247	0.08%	0	55,151	18.36%	1	300,309	100.00%	7	61.56%
Northern	Vanni	39,513	23.98%	1	20,965	12.72%	1	89,886	54.55%	4	876	0.53%	0	13,535	8.21%	0	164,775	100.00%	6	71.89%
Eastern	Batticaloa	32,359	13.55%	1	32,232	13.49%	0	127,185	53.25%	3	81	0.03%	0	46,989	19.67%	1	238,846	100.00%	5	69.11%
Eastern	Ampara	151,013	46.30%	4	89,334	27.39%	2	45,421	13.92%	1	5,391	1.65%	0	35,036	10.74%	0	326,195	100.00%	7	73.99%
Eastern	Trincomalee	83,638	46.36%	2	38,463	21.32%	1	45,894	25.44%	1	2,556	1.42%	0	9,845	5.46%	0	180,396	100.00%	4	74.34%
North Western	Kurunegala	441,275	45.85%	7	474,124	49.26%	8	-	-	-	41,077	4.27%	0	5,947	0.62%	0	962,423	100.00%	15	79.63%
North Western	Puttalam	180,185	50.40%	5	153,130	42.83%	3	-	-	-	12,211	3.42%	0	11,982	3.35%	0	357,508	100.00%	8	68.83%
North Central	Anuradhapura	213,072	44.82%	4	229,856	48.35%	5	-	-	-	28,701	6.04%	0	3,754	0.79%	0	475,383	100.00%	9	79.13%
North Central	Polonnaruwa	118,845	50.26%	3	103,172	43.63%	2	-	-	-	13,497	5.71%	0	948	0.40%	0	236,462	100.00%	5	79.81%
Uva	Badulla	258,844	54.76%	5	179,459	37.97%	3	-	-	-	21,445	4.54%	0	12,934	2.74%	0	472,682	100.00%	8	80.07%
Uva	Monaragala	110,372	41.97%	2	138,136	52.53%	3	-	-	-	13,626	5.18%	0	854	0.32%	0	262,988	100.00%	5	80.13%
Sabaragamuwa	Ratnapura	284,117	44.94%	5	323,636	51.19%	6	-	-	-	21,525	3.40%	0	2,918	0.46%	0	632,196	100.00%	11	80.88%
Sabaragamuwa	Kegalle	247,467	49.52%	5	227,208	45.47%	4	-	-	-	18,184	3.64%	0	6,835	1.37%	0	499,694	100.00%	9	79.81%
National List				13			12			2			2			0			29	
Total		5,098,916	45.66%	106	4,732,664	42.38%	95	515,963	4.62%	16	543,944	4.87%	6	275,488	2.47%	2	11,166,975	100.00%	225	74.23%

== International reaction ==
Supranational bodies

- United Nations – Secretary-General Ban Ki-moon's spokesperson issued a statement on 18 August 2015 applauding the Sri Lankan people "for their peaceful and broad-based participation in the parliamentary elections" and encouraging the new government to "make further progress on good governance, accountability and reconciliation".
- European Union – The European External Action Service spokesperson issued a statement on 19 August 2015 stating that the election was "genuine, well administered and peaceful" and saying that the new government needed prioritise "good governance, human rights and the rule of law as well as the crucial tasks of accountability and genuine national reconciliation".

Nations

- Australia – Foreign Affairs Minister Julie Bishop issued a statement on 21 August 2015 congratulating Wickremesinghe, saying she looked forward to working with the new government "to further develop our strong bilateral relationship" and supporting Sri Lanka on national reconciliation.
- China – Foreign Affairs Ministry spokesperson Hua Chunying congratulated Wickremesinghe on 19 August 2015, saying China was "ready to work with Sri Lanka to consolidate the traditional friendship, strengthen mutually-beneficial cooperation, and elevate China-Sri Lanka strategic cooperation partnership to a new level".
- France – The Ministry of Foreign Affairs and International Development issued a statement on 20 August 2015 welcoming the smooth running of the election, characterising it as "one more step forward towards strengthening democracy" and saying that hopefully this would support human rights and inter-community reconciliation.
- India – Prime Minister Narendra Modi telephoned Wickremesinghe on 18 August 2015 to congratulate him and the Sri Lankan people for the "peaceful conduct of polls".
- Japan – Prime Minister Shinzō Abe sent a congratulatory message to Wickremesinghe "following a free and democratic Parliamentary election".
- Nepal – Prime Minister Sushil Koirala sent a congratulatory message Wickremesinghe and expressed his desire to work closely with his Sri Lankan counterpart to strengthen the bilateral relations between the two countries.
- Singapore – Prime Minister Lee Hsien Loong sent a congratulatory letter to Wickremesinghe adding that "Singapore has consistently supported national reconciliation, peace and progress in Sri Lanka".
- South Korea – Prime Minister Hwang Kyo-ahn sent a congratulatory message to Wickremesinghe saying that the election result "reflects the desire and willingness of the people of Sri Lanka to strengthen democracy and restore good governance" and that "democracy in Sri Lanka is making significant progress".
- United Kingdom – Foreign Secretary Philip Hammond issued a statement on 21 August 2015 congratulating Wickremesinghe, crediting the Sri Lankan people for the way the election was run and offering UK support for achieving "reconciliation and a lasting peace".
