= Dilip =

Dilip may refer to:

== People ==
- Dilīpa, king in Hindu mythology
- Dilip Chhabria, Indian automobile designer
- Dilip Chitre (1938–2009), Indian writer and critic
- Dilip D'Souza (born 1960), Indian writer and journalist
- Dilip Dholakia (1921–2011), often credited as D. Dilip or Dilip Roy, an Indian music composer and singer
- Dilip Doshi (1947–2025), Indian cricketer
- Dilip Hiro, playwright and analyst specializing in India and the Islamic world
- Dilip Jajodia (born 1944), Indian businessman
- Dilip Joshi (born 1968), Indian film and television actor
- Dilip Kumar (1922–2021), Indian actor, also known as Mohammed Yousef Khan
- Dilip Kumar Chakrabarti (born 1941), archaeologist and professor of South Asian archaeology at Cambridge University
- Dilip Mahalanabis (1934–2022), Indian pediatrician
- Dilip P. Gaonkar (born 1945), associate professor of communication studies at Northwestern University
- Dilip Prabhavalkar (born 1944), Indian Marathi film and television actor
- Dilip Ray (born 1954), Indian politician and hotelier
- Dilip Rayamajhi (born 1976), Nepali actor
- Dilip Roy (disambiguation), several
- Dilip Sardesai (1940–2007), Indian test cricketer
- Dilip Sarkar (Tripura politician) (?–2019), Indian politician
- Dalip Tahil (born 1952), Indian film, television and theatre actor
- Dilip T. (born 1980), India national cricket team's current fielding coach
- Dilip Tirkey (born 1977), Indian hockey player
- Dilip Vengsarkar (born 1956), Indian cricketer
- Dilip Wagh, politician
- Dilip Wedaarachchi (born 1957), Sri Lankan politician
- R. Dilip (Tamil actor) (1950s–2012), Indian actor

== Other uses ==
- Mons Dilip, location on the Moon

== See also ==
- Dileep (disambiguation)
