= Bal (surname) =

Bal is a surname of Dutch, Punjabi, Turkish or Polish origin.

In Dutch, bal means "ball" and the name sometimes is metonymic (e.g. indicating a ball player), but primarily appears patronymic after a short form of the name Baldwin.

In Turkish, bal means "honey", and could have a metonymic occupational origin from e.g. a beekeeper.

The Polish surname originated in the 15th century with Jan I Bal. His descendants held various titles and offices in south-eastern Poland until the partitions. Baligród ("Bal's borough" in Polish) was founded by Piotr II Bal. According to the Universal Electronic System for Registration of the Population in 2002 there were 2016 people with that surname living in Poland.

Notable people with the name include:

- Andriy Bal (1958–2014), Ukrainian footballer and coach
- Anton Bal (born 1963), Papua-New Guinea Catholic bishop of Dutch descent
- Bülent Bal (born 1977), Turkish footballer
- Cees Bal (born 1951), Dutch racing cyclist
- Dileep G. Bal (born 1945), Indian-American physician
- Duygu Bal (born 1987), Turkish volleyball player
- Emre Bal (born 1997), Dutch footballer of Turkish descent
- Hannie Bal (1921–2012), Dutch painter
- Harigopal Bal, Indian freedom fighter
- Hartosh Singh Bal (born 1966/67), Indian editor, journalist, and columnist
- Henri Bal (born 1958), Dutch computer scientist
- İdris Bal (born 1968), Turkish politician and political scientist
- Jeanne Bal (1928–1996), American actress
- Kadir Bal (born 1966), Turkish bureaucrat, diplomat, and engineer
- Lokenath Bal, Indian freedom fighter
- Martyn Bal (born 1976), Dutch fashion designer
- Mieke Bal (born 1946), Dutch cultural theorist and video artist
- Nanda Kishore Bal (1875–1928), Indian (Odia) poet
- Navjeet Bal, American jurist
- Nicolas Bal (born 1978), French Nordic combined skier
- Randall Bal (born 1980), American backstroke swimmer
- Rohit Bal (1961–2024), Indian fashion designer
- Rupan Bal (born 1990), Indian-born Canadian actor and comedian
- Vidya Bal (1937–2020), Indian (Marathi) writer and editor
- Vincent Bal (born 1971), Belgian movie director
- Vineeta Bal, Indian immunologist

== See also ==
- Ball (surname)
- Bal (disambiguation)
- Bal (given name)
- Shalla-Bal, a Marvel Comics character
