= Dileep (disambiguation) =

Dileep (born 1968) is an Indian film actor and producer who works in Malayalam films.

Dileep may also refer to:

- Dileep Agrawal, (born 1973), Nepalese businessman, entrepreneur, philanthropist and investor
- Dileep G. Bal, (born 1945), Indian-American physician
- Dileep Singh Bhuria, (1944–2015) was a member of Lok Sabha of India
- Dileep George, (born 1977), AI and neuroscience researcher
- Dileep Jhaveri (born 1943), Gujarati language poet, playwright, editor and translator from India
- Dileep Kumar (disambiguation)
  - Dileep Kumar (politician), Indian politician and Member of Andhra Pradesh Legislative Council
- Dileep K. Nair, Indian educationist, skill development campaigner, social activist and publisher
- Dileep Nair, former United Nations Under Secretary General
- Dileep Rao (born 1973), American actor
- Dileep Raj (born 1978), Indian actor, director and producer known for his work in Kannada cinema
- Dileepbhai Sanghani (born 1954), politician
- Dileep Shankar (1970–2024), Indian actor, director and writer
- Dileep Singh (1891–1961), the last official ruler of the princely state of Sailana State
- A. R. Rahman (born Dileep Kumar in 1966), Indian composer, musician, and record producer

== See also ==
- Dilip (disambiguation)
