= Mulkirigala Polling Division =

Mulkirigala
- Polling Division
- Coordinates: 6.187949°N 80.730273°E
- Country: Sri Lanka
- Province: Southern Province, Sri Lanka
- Electoral District: Hambantota Electoral District

Area
  - Total: 324.78 km^{2} (125.40 sq mi)

Population (2012)
  - Total: 130,611
  - Density: 402/km^{2} (1,040/sq mi)
- ISO 3166 code: EC-09A

The Mulkirigala Polling Division is a Polling Division in the Hambantota Electoral District, in the Southern Province, Sri Lanka.

== Presidential Election Results ==
=== Summary ===
The winner of Mulkirigala has matched the final country result 6 out of 8 times. Hence, Mulkirigala is a Weak Bellwether for Presidential Elections.

Year	Mulkirigala	Hambantota Electoral District	MAE %	Sri Lanka	MAE %
2019	SLPP	SLPP	1.17%	SLPP	14.99%
2015	UPFA	UPFA	1.62%	NDF	16.88%
2010	UPFA	UPFA	0.25%	UPFA	8.77%
2005	UPFA	UPFA	0.96%	UPFA	12.08%
1999	PA	PA	1.76%	PA	4.08%
1994	PA	PA	3.44%	PA	3.97%
1988	UNP	UNP	0.24%	UNP	1.80%
1982	SLFP	UNP	3.80%	UNP	7.92%
Matches/Mean MAE	6/8	7/8	1.65%	8/8	8.81%

=== 2019 Sri Lankan Presidential Election ===
Party	Mulkirigala		Hambantota Electoral District		Sri Lanka	
Party	Votes	%	Votes	%	Votes	%
SLPP	58,903	67.73%	278,804	66.17%	6,924,255	52.25%
NDF	22,329	25.68%	108,906	25.85%	5,564,239	41.99%
NMPP	4,192	4.82%	26,295	6.24%	418,553	3.16%
Other Parties (with < 1%)	1,542	1.77%	7,369	1.75%	345,452	2.61%
Valid Votes	86,966	99.21%	421,374	99.25%	13,252,499	98.99%
Rejected Votes	691	0.79%	3,179	0.75%	135,452	1.01%
Total Polled	87,657	87.80%	424,553	87.36%	13,387,951	83.71%
Registered Electors	99,833		485,986		15,992,568	

=== 2015 Sri Lankan Presidential Election ===
Party	Mulkirigala		Hambantota Electoral District		Sri Lanka	
Party	Votes	%	Votes	%	Votes	%
UPFA	52,202	64.58%	243,295	63.02%	5,768,090	47.58%
NDF	27,601	34.14%	138,708	35.93%	6,217,162	51.28%
Other Parties (with < 1%)	1,034	1.28%	4,073	1.05%	138,200	1.14%
Valid Votes	80,837	99.19%	386,076	99.14%	12,123,452	98.85%
Rejected Votes	658	0.81%	3,351	0.86%	140,925	1.15%
Total Polled	81,495	80.92%	389,427	81.23%	12,264,377	78.69%
Registered Electors	100,711		479,433		15,585,942	

=== 2010 Sri Lankan Presidential Election ===
Party	Mulkirigala		Hambantota Electoral District		Sri Lanka	
Party	Votes	%	Votes	%	Votes	%
UPFA	48,187	66.88%	226,887	67.21%	6,015,934	57.88%
NDF	22,537	31.28%	105,336	31.20%	4,173,185	40.15%
Other Parties (with < 1%)	1,326	1.84%	5,341	1.58%	204,494	1.97%
Valid Votes	72,050	99.27%	337,564	99.35%	10,393,613	99.03%
Rejected Votes	529	0.73%	2,218	0.65%	101,838	0.97%
Total Polled	72,579	77.47%	339,782	78.29%	10,495,451	66.70%
Registered Electors	93,685		433,991		15,734,587	

=== 2005 Sri Lankan Presidential Election ===
Party	Mulkirigala		Hambantota Electoral District		Sri Lanka	
Party	Votes	%	Votes	%	Votes	%
UPFA	42,897	62.36%	202,918	63.43%	4,887,152	50.29%
UNP	24,784	36.03%	112,712	35.23%	4,706,366	48.43%
Other Parties (with < 1%)	1,108	1.61%	4,295	1.34%	123,521	1.27%
Valid Votes	68,789	99.07%	319,925	99.09%	9,717,039	98.88%
Rejected Votes	645	0.93%	2,928	0.91%	109,869	1.12%
Total Polled	69,434	78.43%	322,853	79.47%	9,826,908	69.51%
Registered Electors	88,528		406,270		14,136,979	

=== 1999 Sri Lankan Presidential Election ===
Party	Mulkirigala		Hambantota Electoral District		Sri Lanka	
Party	Votes	%	Votes	%	Votes	%
PA	24,728	46.08%	120,275	47.41%	4,312,157	51.12%
UNP	21,426	39.93%	95,088	37.48%	3,602,748	42.71%
JVP	6,298	11.74%	33,739	13.30%	343,927	4.08%
Other Parties (with < 1%)	1,212	2.26%	4,576	1.80%	176,679	2.09%
Valid Votes	53,664	97.48%	253,678	97.93%	8,435,754	97.69%
Rejected Votes	1,389	2.52%	5,375	2.07%	199,536	2.31%
Total Polled	55,053	70.05%	259,053	72.69%	8,635,290	72.17%
Registered Electors	78,596		356,394		11,965,536	

=== 1994 Sri Lankan Presidential Election ===
Party	Mulkirigala		Hambantota Electoral District		Sri Lanka	
Party	Votes	%	Votes	%	Votes	%
PA	26,535	57.80%	132,873	61.52%	4,709,205	62.28%
UNP	17,983	39.17%	77,735	35.99%	2,715,283	35.91%
Other Parties (with < 1%)	1,391	3.03%	5,387	2.49%	137,040	1.81%
Valid Votes	45,909	97.85%	215,995	98.18%	7,561,526	98.03%
Rejected Votes	1,010	2.15%	4,013	1.82%	151,706	1.97%
Total Polled	46,919	64.07%	220,008	66.06%	7,713,232	69.12%
Registered Electors	73,236		333,054		11,158,880	

=== 1988 Sri Lankan Presidential Election ===
Party	Mulkirigala		Hambantota Electoral District		Sri Lanka	
Party	Votes	%	Votes	%	Votes	%
UNP	5,952	49.30%	41,198	49.62%	2,569,199	50.43%
SLFP	5,740	47.54%	39,343	47.39%	2,289,857	44.95%
SLMP	382	3.16%	2,478	2.98%	235,701	4.63%
Valid Votes	12,074	94.79%	83,019	95.56%	5,094,754	98.24%
Rejected Votes	663	5.21%	3,855	4.44%	91,499	1.76%
Total Polled	12,737	19.08%	86,874	29.40%	5,186,256	55.87%
Registered Electors	66,740		295,536		9,283,143	

=== 1982 Sri Lankan Presidential Election ===
Party	Mulkirigala		Hambantota Electoral District		Sri Lanka	
Party	Votes	%	Votes	%	Votes	%
SLFP	19,605	43.57%	76,402	38.73%	2,546,348	39.05%
UNP	18,964	42.15%	90,545	45.90%	3,450,815	52.93%
JVP	5,966	13.26%	28,835	14.62%	273,428	4.19%
Other Parties (with < 1%)	458	1.02%	1,496	0.76%	249,460	3.83%
Valid Votes	44,993	98.94%	197,278	99.09%	6,520,156	98.78%
Rejected Votes	484	1.06%	1,804	0.91%	80,470	1.22%
Total Polled	45,477	79.10%	199,082	81.37%	6,600,626	80.15%
Registered Electors	57,491		244,660		8,235,358	

== Parliamentary Election Results ==
=== Summary ===
The winner of Mulkirigala has matched the final country result 5 out of 7 times. Hence, Mulkirigala is a Weak Bellwether for Parliamentary Elections.

Year	Mulkirigala	Hambantota Electoral District	MAE %	Sri Lanka	MAE %
2015	UPFA	UPFA	1.84%	UNP	10.97%
2010	UPFA	UPFA	0.49%	UPFA	1.91%
2004	UPFA	UPFA	3.88%	UPFA	7.15%
2001	UNP	UNP	2.10%	UNP	2.13%
2000	UNP	UNP	1.55%	PA	4.05%
1994	PA	PA	1.58%	PA	3.06%
1989	UNP	UNP	2.71%	UNP	6.95%
Matches/Mean MAE	5/7	5/7	2.02%	7/7	5.18%

=== 2015 Sri Lankan Parliamentary Election ===
Party	Mulkirigala		Hambantota Electoral District		Sri Lanka	
Party	Votes	%	Votes	%	Votes	%
UPFA	42,503	56.55%	196,980	53.87%	4,732,664	42.48%
UNP	26,429	35.16%	130,433	35.67%	5,098,916	45.77%
JVP	5,854	7.79%	36,527	9.99%	544,154	4.88%
Other Parties (with < 1%)	378	0.50%	1,743	0.48%	82,845	0.74%
Valid Votes	75,164	96.98%	365,683	97.29%	11,140,333	95.35%
Rejected Votes	2,314	2.99%	10,056	2.68%	516,926	4.42%
Total Polled	77,505	76.96%	375,885	81.20%	11,684,111	77.66%
Registered Electors	100,711		462,911		15,044,490	

=== 2010 Sri Lankan Parliamentary Election ===
Party	Mulkirigala		Hambantota Electoral District		Sri Lanka	
Party	Votes	%	Votes	%	Votes	%
UPFA	35,851	62.73%	174,808	62.87%	4,846,388	60.38%
UNP	17,700	30.97%	83,027	29.86%	2,357,057	29.37%
DNA	3,364	5.89%	19,186	6.90%	441,251	5.50%
Other Parties (with < 1%)	236	0.41%	1,033	0.37%	23,385	0.29%
Valid Votes	57,151	95.55%	278,054	96.11%	8,026,322	96.03%
Rejected Votes	2,661	4.45%	11,240	3.89%	581,465	6.96%
Total Polled	59,812	63.84%	289,294	66.47%	8,358,246	59.29%
Registered Electors	93,685		435,218		14,097,690	

=== 2004 Sri Lankan Parliamentary Election ===
Party	Mulkirigala		Hambantota Electoral District		Sri Lanka	
Party	Votes	%	Votes	%	Votes	%
UPFA	34,604	60.11%	178,895	64.05%	4,223,126	45.70%
UNP	22,582	39.23%	98,877	35.40%	3,486,792	37.73%
Other Parties (with < 1%)	382	0.66%	1,538	0.55%	58,285	0.63%
Valid Votes	57,568	92.84%	279,310	94.03%	9,241,931	94.52%
Rejected Votes	4,438	7.16%	17,724	5.97%	534,452	5.47%
Total Polled	62,006	72.47%	297,034	77.28%	9,777,821	75.74%
Registered Electors	85,563		384,361		12,909,631	

=== 2001 Sri Lankan Parliamentary Election ===
Party	Mulkirigala		Hambantota Electoral District		Sri Lanka	
Party	Votes	%	Votes	%	Votes	%
UNP	25,854	43.08%	112,520	40.02%	4,086,026	45.62%
PA	22,625	37.70%	105,175	37.41%	3,330,815	37.19%
JVP	10,600	17.66%	59,693	21.23%	815,353	9.10%
Other Parties (with < 1%)	928	1.55%	3,774	1.34%	115,846	1.29%
Valid Votes	60,007	94.78%	281,162	95.46%	8,955,844	94.77%
Rejected Votes	3,302	5.22%	13,378	4.54%	494,009	5.23%
Total Polled	63,309	76.85%	294,540	79.81%	9,449,878	76.03%
Registered Electors	82,382		369,073		12,428,762	

=== 2000 Sri Lankan Parliamentary Election ===
Party	Mulkirigala		Hambantota Electoral District		Sri Lanka	
Party	Votes	%	Votes	%	Votes	%
UNP	26,409	44.52%	119,074	43.12%	3,451,765	40.12%
PA	24,401	41.13%	110,308	39.95%	3,899,329	45.33%
JVP	7,191	12.12%	42,042	15.23%	518,725	6.03%
Other Parties (with < 1%)	1,322	2.23%	4,703	1.70%	260,613	3.03%
Valid Votes	59,323	N/A	276,127	N/A	8,602,617	N/A

=== 1994 Sri Lankan Parliamentary Election ===
Party	Mulkirigala		Hambantota Electoral District		Sri Lanka	
Party	Votes	%	Votes	%	Votes	%
PA	28,181	52.46%	132,008	53.51%	3,887,805	48.94%
UNP	22,078	41.10%	95,382	38.67%	3,498,370	44.04%
SLPF	2,679	4.99%	15,309	6.21%	90,078	1.13%
Other Parties (with < 1%)	782	1.46%	3,980	1.61%	134,507	1.69%
Valid Votes	53,720	93.45%	246,679	94.80%	7,943,688	95.20%
Rejected Votes	3,763	6.55%	13,539	5.20%	400,395	4.80%
Total Polled	57,483	78.49%	260,218	78.19%	8,344,095	74.75%
Registered Electors	73,236		332,805		11,163,064	

=== 1989 Sri Lankan Parliamentary Election ===
Party	Mulkirigala		Hambantota Electoral District		Sri Lanka	
Party	Votes	%	Votes	%	Votes	%
UNP	8,653	59.87%	31,639	55.92%	2,838,005	50.71%
SLFP	5,581	38.61%	22,459	39.70%	1,785,369	31.90%
Other Parties (with < 1%)	220	1.52%	2,477	4.38%	363,149	6.49%
Valid Votes	14,454	97.28%	56,575	92.88%	5,596,468	93.87%
Rejected Votes	404	2.72%	4,339	7.12%	365,563	6.13%
Total Polled	14,858	22.47%	60,914	20.64%	5,962,031	63.60%
Registered Electors	66,111		295,120		9,374,164	

== Demographics ==
=== Ethnicity ===
The Mulkirigala Polling Division has a Sinhalese majority (99.3%) . In comparison, the Hambantota Electoral District (which contains the Mulkirigala Polling Division) has a Sinhalese majority (97.1%)

Ethnicity in Mulkirigala
1. Sinhalese (99.3%)
2. Other (0.70%)

=== Religion ===
The Mulkirigala Polling Division has a Buddhist majority (99.2%) . In comparison, the Hambantota Electoral District (which contains the Mulkirigala Polling Division) has a Buddhist majority (96.7%)

Religion in Mulkirigala
1. Buddhist (99.2%)
2. Other (0.80%)
