= Beliatta Polling Division =

Beliatta
- Polling Division
- Coordinates: 6.090694°N 80.706439°E
- Country: Sri Lanka
- Province: Southern Province, Sri Lanka
- Electoral District: Hambantota Electoral District

Area
  - Total: 141.63 km^{2} (54.68 sq mi)

Population (2012)
  - Total: 75,010
  - Density: 530/km^{2} (1,400/sq mi)
- ISO 3166 code: EC-09B

The Beliatta Polling Division is a Polling Division in the Hambantota Electoral District, in the Southern Province, Sri Lanka.

== Presidential Election Results ==
=== Summary ===
The winner of Beliatta has matched the final country result 7 out of 8 times. Hence, Beliatta is a Strong Bellwether for Presidential Elections.

Year	Beliatta	Hambantota Electoral District	MAE %	Sri Lanka	MAE %
2019	SLPP	SLPP	0.26%	SLPP	13.84%
2015	UPFA	UPFA	0.62%	NDF	15.84%
2010	UPFA	UPFA	0.32%	UPFA	8.67%
2005	UPFA	UPFA	1.15%	UPFA	14.16%
1999	PA	PA	1.60%	PA	3.43%
1994	PA	PA	1.01%	PA	1.52%
1988	UNP	UNP	2.94%	UNP	1.47%
1982	UNP	UNP	0.82%	UNP	4.30%
Matches/Mean MAE	7/8	7/8	1.09%	8/8	7.90%

=== 2019 Sri Lankan Presidential Election ===
Party	Beliatta		Hambantota Electoral District		Sri Lanka	
Party	Votes	%	Votes	%	Votes	%
SLPP	42,668	66.01%	278,804	66.17%	6,924,255	52.25%
NDF	17,029	26.34%	108,906	25.85%	5,564,239	41.99%
NMPP	3,793	5.87%	26,295	6.24%	418,553	3.16%
Other Parties (with < 1%)	1,151	1.78%	7,369	1.75%	345,452	2.61%
Valid Votes	64,641	99.26%	421,374	99.25%	13,252,499	98.99%
Rejected Votes	483	0.74%	3,179	0.75%	135,452	1.01%
Total Polled	65,124	85.86%	424,553	87.36%	13,387,951	83.71%
Registered Electors	75,851		485,986		15,992,568	

=== 2015 Sri Lankan Presidential Election ===
Party	Beliatta		Hambantota Electoral District		Sri Lanka	
Party	Votes	%	Votes	%	Votes	%
UPFA	39,513	63.65%	243,295	63.02%	5,768,090	47.58%
NDF	21,912	35.29%	138,708	35.93%	6,217,162	51.28%
Other Parties (with < 1%)	658	1.06%	4,073	1.05%	138,200	1.14%
Valid Votes	62,083	99.12%	386,076	99.14%	12,123,452	98.85%
Rejected Votes	553	0.88%	3,351	0.86%	140,925	1.15%
Total Polled	62,636	80.06%	389,427	81.23%	12,264,377	78.69%
Registered Electors	78,234		479,433		15,585,942	

=== 2010 Sri Lankan Presidential Election ===
Party	Beliatta		Hambantota Electoral District		Sri Lanka	
Party	Votes	%	Votes	%	Votes	%
UPFA	38,055	66.93%	226,887	67.21%	6,015,934	57.88%
NDF	17,965	31.59%	105,336	31.20%	4,173,185	40.15%
Other Parties (with < 1%)	842	1.48%	5,341	1.58%	204,494	1.97%
Valid Votes	56,862	99.43%	337,564	99.35%	10,393,613	99.03%
Rejected Votes	324	0.57%	2,218	0.65%	101,838	0.97%
Total Polled	57,186	76.79%	339,782	78.29%	10,495,451	66.70%
Registered Electors	74,470		433,991		15,734,587	

=== 2005 Sri Lankan Presidential Election ===
Party	Beliatta		Hambantota Electoral District		Sri Lanka	
Party	Votes	%	Votes	%	Votes	%
UPFA	36,615	64.56%	202,918	63.43%	4,887,152	50.29%
UNP	19,290	34.01%	112,712	35.23%	4,706,366	48.43%
Other Parties (with < 1%)	808	1.42%	4,295	1.34%	123,521	1.27%
Valid Votes	56,713	99.14%	319,925	99.09%	9,717,039	98.88%
Rejected Votes	492	0.86%	2,928	0.91%	109,869	1.12%
Total Polled	57,205	78.51%	322,853	79.47%	9,826,908	69.51%
Registered Electors	72,862		406,270		14,136,979	

=== 1999 Sri Lankan Presidential Election ===
Party	Beliatta		Hambantota Electoral District		Sri Lanka	
Party	Votes	%	Votes	%	Votes	%
PA	24,492	49.85%	120,275	47.41%	4,312,157	51.12%
UNP	18,140	36.92%	95,088	37.48%	3,602,748	42.71%
JVP	5,691	11.58%	33,739	13.30%	343,927	4.08%
Other Parties (with < 1%)	807	1.64%	4,576	1.80%	176,679	2.09%
Valid Votes	49,130	98.16%	253,678	97.93%	8,435,754	97.69%
Rejected Votes	919	1.84%	5,375	2.07%	199,536	2.31%
Total Polled	50,049	73.23%	259,053	72.69%	8,635,290	72.17%
Registered Electors	68,349		356,394		11,965,536	

=== 1994 Sri Lankan Presidential Election ===
Party	Beliatta		Hambantota Electoral District		Sri Lanka	
Party	Votes	%	Votes	%	Votes	%
PA	26,335	60.54%	132,873	61.52%	4,709,205	62.28%
UNP	16,150	37.12%	77,735	35.99%	2,715,283	35.91%
Other Parties (with < 1%)	1,017	2.34%	5,387	2.49%	137,040	1.81%
Valid Votes	43,502	98.52%	215,995	98.18%	7,561,526	98.03%
Rejected Votes	652	1.48%	4,013	1.82%	151,706	1.97%
Total Polled	44,154	66.81%	220,008	66.06%	7,713,232	69.12%
Registered Electors	66,091		333,054		11,158,880	

=== 1988 Sri Lankan Presidential Election ===
Party	Beliatta		Hambantota Electoral District		Sri Lanka	
Party	Votes	%	Votes	%	Votes	%
UNP	6,793	52.86%	41,198	49.62%	2,569,199	50.43%
SLFP	5,733	44.61%	39,343	47.39%	2,289,857	44.95%
SLMP	326	2.54%	2,478	2.98%	235,701	4.63%
Valid Votes	12,852	96.32%	83,019	95.56%	5,094,754	98.24%
Rejected Votes	491	3.68%	3,855	4.44%	91,499	1.76%
Total Polled	13,343	21.26%	86,874	29.40%	5,186,256	55.87%
Registered Electors	62,773		295,536		9,283,143	

=== 1982 Sri Lankan Presidential Election ===
Party	Beliatta		Hambantota Electoral District		Sri Lanka	
Party	Votes	%	Votes	%	Votes	%
UNP	21,056	46.25%	90,545	45.90%	3,450,815	52.93%
SLFP	18,150	39.86%	76,402	38.73%	2,546,348	39.05%
JVP	5,957	13.08%	28,835	14.62%	273,428	4.19%
Other Parties (with < 1%)	368	0.81%	1,496	0.76%	249,460	3.83%
Valid Votes	45,531	99.18%	197,278	99.09%	6,520,156	98.78%
Rejected Votes	378	0.82%	1,804	0.91%	80,470	1.22%
Total Polled	45,909	81.61%	199,082	81.37%	6,600,626	80.15%
Registered Electors	56,254		244,660		8,235,358	

== Parliamentary Election Results ==
=== Summary ===
The winner of Beliatta has matched the final country result 5 out of 7 times. Hence, Beliatta is a Weak Bellwether for Parliamentary Elections.

Year	Beliatta	Hambantota Electoral District	MAE %	Sri Lanka	MAE %
2015	UPFA	UPFA	0.31%	UNP	9.38%
2010	UPFA	UPFA	3.54%	UPFA	4.86%
2004	UPFA	UPFA	0.05%	UPFA	9.32%
2001	PA	UNP	2.24%	UNP	5.06%
2000	PA	UNP	3.25%	PA	1.09%
1994	PA	PA	0.46%	PA	4.35%
1989	UNP	UNP	1.07%	UNP	6.18%
Matches/Mean MAE	5/7	5/7	1.56%	7/7	5.75%

=== 2015 Sri Lankan Parliamentary Election ===
Party	Beliatta		Hambantota Electoral District		Sri Lanka	
Party	Votes	%	Votes	%	Votes	%
UPFA	31,389	53.87%	196,980	53.87%	4,732,664	42.48%
UNP	21,165	36.33%	130,433	35.67%	5,098,916	45.77%
JVP	5,399	9.27%	36,527	9.99%	544,154	4.88%
Other Parties (with < 1%)	311	0.53%	1,743	0.48%	82,845	0.74%
Valid Votes	58,264	97.39%	365,683	97.29%	11,140,333	95.35%
Rejected Votes	1,533	2.56%	10,056	2.68%	516,926	4.42%
Total Polled	59,825	76.47%	375,885	81.20%	11,684,111	77.66%
Registered Electors	78,234		462,911		15,044,490	

=== 2010 Sri Lankan Parliamentary Election ===
Party	Beliatta		Hambantota Electoral District		Sri Lanka	
Party	Votes	%	Votes	%	Votes	%
UPFA	31,330	66.60%	174,808	62.87%	4,846,388	60.38%
UNP	12,192	25.92%	83,027	29.86%	2,357,057	29.37%
DNA	3,338	7.10%	19,186	6.90%	441,251	5.50%
Other Parties (with < 1%)	181	0.38%	1,033	0.37%	23,385	0.29%
Valid Votes	47,041	96.08%	278,054	96.11%	8,026,322	96.03%
Rejected Votes	1,917	3.92%	11,240	3.89%	581,465	6.96%
Total Polled	48,958	65.74%	289,294	66.47%	8,358,246	59.29%
Registered Electors	74,470		435,218		14,097,690	

=== 2004 Sri Lankan Parliamentary Election ===
Party	Beliatta		Hambantota Electoral District		Sri Lanka	
Party	Votes	%	Votes	%	Votes	%
UPFA	32,017	64.06%	178,895	64.05%	4,223,126	45.70%
UNP	17,631	35.28%	98,877	35.40%	3,486,792	37.73%
Other Parties (with < 1%)	328	0.66%	1,538	0.55%	58,285	0.63%
Valid Votes	49,976	94.84%	279,310	94.03%	9,241,931	94.52%
Rejected Votes	2,717	5.16%	17,724	5.97%	534,452	5.47%
Total Polled	52,693	73.14%	297,034	77.28%	9,777,821	75.74%
Registered Electors	72,045		384,361		12,909,631	

=== 2001 Sri Lankan Parliamentary Election ===
Party	Beliatta		Hambantota Electoral District		Sri Lanka	
Party	Votes	%	Votes	%	Votes	%
PA	21,272	41.06%	105,175	37.41%	3,330,815	37.19%
UNP	20,457	39.49%	112,520	40.02%	4,086,026	45.62%
JVP	9,385	18.12%	59,693	21.23%	815,353	9.10%
Other Parties (with < 1%)	688	1.33%	3,774	1.34%	115,846	1.29%
Valid Votes	51,802	95.42%	281,162	95.46%	8,955,844	94.77%
Rejected Votes	2,484	4.58%	13,378	4.54%	494,009	5.23%
Total Polled	54,286	76.94%	294,540	79.81%	9,449,878	76.03%
Registered Electors	70,560		369,073		12,428,762	

=== 2000 Sri Lankan Parliamentary Election ===
Party	Beliatta		Hambantota Electoral District		Sri Lanka	
Party	Votes	%	Votes	%	Votes	%
PA	22,406	44.23%	110,308	39.95%	3,899,329	45.33%
UNP	20,221	39.92%	119,074	43.12%	3,451,765	40.12%
JVP	7,192	14.20%	42,042	15.23%	518,725	6.03%
Other Parties (with < 1%)	841	1.66%	4,703	1.70%	260,613	3.03%
Valid Votes	50,660	N/A	276,127	N/A	8,602,617	N/A

=== 1994 Sri Lankan Parliamentary Election ===
Party	Beliatta		Hambantota Electoral District		Sri Lanka	
Party	Votes	%	Votes	%	Votes	%
PA	25,501	52.76%	132,008	53.51%	3,887,805	48.94%
UNP	18,643	38.57%	95,382	38.67%	3,498,370	44.04%
SLPF	3,169	6.56%	15,309	6.21%	90,078	1.13%
MEP	680	1.41%	2,080	0.84%	68,538	0.86%
Other Parties (with < 1%)	338	0.70%	1,900	0.77%	65,969	0.83%
Valid Votes	48,331	95.40%	246,679	94.80%	7,943,688	95.20%
Rejected Votes	2,333	4.60%	13,539	5.20%	400,395	4.80%
Total Polled	50,664	76.66%	260,218	78.19%	8,344,095	74.75%
Registered Electors	66,091		332,805		11,163,064	

=== 1989 Sri Lankan Parliamentary Election ===
Party	Beliatta		Hambantota Electoral District		Sri Lanka	
Party	Votes	%	Votes	%	Votes	%
UNP	6,235	57.12%	31,639	55.92%	2,838,005	50.71%
SLFP	4,418	40.47%	22,459	39.70%	1,785,369	31.90%
DPLF	242	2.22%	648	1.15%	19,150	0.34%
Other Parties (with < 1%)	21	0.19%	1,829	3.23%	343,999	6.15%
Valid Votes	10,916	98.17%	56,575	92.88%	5,596,468	93.87%
Rejected Votes	204	1.83%	4,339	7.12%	365,563	6.13%
Total Polled	11,120	18.09%	60,914	20.64%	5,962,031	63.60%
Registered Electors	61,466		295,120		9,374,164	

== Demographics ==
=== Ethnicity ===
The Beliatta Polling Division has a Sinhalese majority (99.8%) . In comparison, the Hambantota Electoral District (which contains the Beliatta Polling Division) has a Sinhalese majority (97.1%)

Ethnicity in Beliatta
1. Sinhalese (99.8%)
2. Other (0.20%)

=== Religion ===
The Beliatta Polling Division has a Buddhist majority (99.6%) . In comparison, the Hambantota Electoral District (which contains the Beliatta Polling Division) has a Buddhist majority (96.7%)

Religion in Beliatta
1. Buddhist (99.6%)
2. Other (0.40%)
