= Hewage =

Hewage (Sinhala: හේවගේ, romanized: Hēvagē) is a Sinhalese surname. Notable people with the surname include:

- Athula Hewage, Sri Lankan politician
- Chaamikara Hewage (born 1998), Sri Lankan cricketer
- Nalin Hewage, Sri Lankan politician
- Pradeep Hewage (born 1978), Sri Lankan cricketer
