= Navjeet =

Navjeet is a feminine given name. Notable people with the name include:

- Navjeet Bal, American lawyer
- Navjeet Kaur Dhillon (born 1995), Indian athlete
