= Thissamaharama Polling Division =

Thissamaharama
- Polling Division
- Coordinates: 6.311388°N 81.305029°E
- Country: Sri Lanka
- Province: Southern Province, Sri Lanka
- Electoral District: Hambantota Electoral District

Area
  - Total: 1,507.27 km^{2} (581.96 sq mi)

Population (2012)
  - Total: 200,531
  - Density: 133/km^{2} (340/sq mi)
- ISO 3166 code: EC-09D

The Thissamaharama Polling Division is a Polling Division in the Hambantota Electoral District, in the Southern Province, Sri Lanka.

== Presidential Election Results ==
=== Summary ===
The winner of Thissamaharama has matched the final country result 7 out of 8 times. Hence, Thissamaharama is considered a strong bellwether for Presidential Elections.

Year	Thissamaharama	Hambantota Electoral District	MAE %	Sri Lanka	MAE %
2019	SLPP	SLPP	3.40%	SLPP	10.64%
2015	UPFA	UPFA	2.99%	NDF	12.24%
2010	UPFA	UPFA	2.57%	UPFA	6.44%
2005	UPFA	UPFA	2.95%	UPFA	10.04%
1999	PA	PA	0.09%	PA	4.41%
1994	PA	PA	1.68%	PA	1.19%
1988	UNP	UNP	0.66%	UNP	2.23%
1982	UNP	UNP	0.96%	UNP	3.95%
Matches/Mean MAE	7/8	7/8	1.91%	8/8	6.39%

=== 2019 Sri Lankan Presidential Election ===
Party	Thissamaharama		Hambantota Electoral District		Sri Lanka	
Party	Votes	%	Votes	%	Votes	%
SLPP	91,577	62.55%	278,804	66.17%	6,924,255	52.25%
NDF	43,460	29.68%	108,906	25.85%	5,564,239	41.99%
NMPP	8,749	5.98%	26,295	6.24%	418,553	3.16%
Other Parties (with < 1%)	2,623	1.79%	7,369	1.75%	345,452	2.61%
Valid Votes	146,409	99.32%	421,374	99.25%	13,252,499	98.99%
Rejected Votes	1,007	0.68%	3,179	0.75%	135,452	1.01%
Total Polled	147,416	86.94%	424,553	87.36%	13,387,951	83.71%
Registered Electors	169,555		485,986		15,992,568	

=== 2015 Sri Lankan Presidential Election ===
Party	Thissamaharama		Hambantota Electoral District		Sri Lanka	
Party	Votes	%	Votes	%	Votes	%
UPFA	78,546	59.99%	243,295	63.02%	5,768,090	47.58%
NDF	50,977	38.93%	138,708	35.93%	6,217,162	51.28%
Other Parties (with < 1%)	1,412	1.08%	4,073	1.05%	138,200	1.14%
Valid Votes	130,935	99.17%	386,076	99.14%	12,123,452	98.85%
Rejected Votes	1,102	0.83%	3,351	0.86%	140,925	1.15%
Total Polled	132,037	80.60%	389,427	81.23%	12,264,377	78.69%
Registered Electors	163,818		479,433		15,585,942	

=== 2010 Sri Lankan Presidential Election ===
Party	Thissamaharama		Hambantota Electoral District		Sri Lanka	
Party	Votes	%	Votes	%	Votes	%
UPFA	71,581	64.58%	226,887	67.21%	6,015,934	57.88%
NDF	37,426	33.77%	105,336	31.20%	4,173,185	40.15%
Other Parties (with < 1%)	1,827	1.65%	5,341	1.58%	204,494	1.97%
Valid Votes	110,834	99.33%	337,564	99.35%	10,393,613	99.03%
Rejected Votes	748	0.67%	2,218	0.65%	101,838	0.97%
Total Polled	111,582	77.69%	339,782	78.29%	10,495,451	66.70%
Registered Electors	143,622		433,991		15,734,587	

=== 2005 Sri Lankan Presidential Election ===
Party	Thissamaharama		Hambantota Electoral District		Sri Lanka	
Party	Votes	%	Votes	%	Votes	%
UPFA	63,197	60.47%	202,918	63.43%	4,887,152	50.29%
UNP	40,006	38.28%	112,712	35.23%	4,706,366	48.43%
Other Parties (with < 1%)	1,310	1.25%	4,295	1.34%	123,521	1.27%
Valid Votes	104,513	99.04%	319,925	99.09%	9,717,039	98.88%
Rejected Votes	1,012	0.96%	2,928	0.91%	109,869	1.12%
Total Polled	105,525	79.23%	322,853	79.47%	9,826,908	69.51%
Registered Electors	133,196		406,270		14,136,979	

=== 1999 Sri Lankan Presidential Election ===
Party	Thissamaharama		Hambantota Electoral District		Sri Lanka	
Party	Votes	%	Votes	%	Votes	%
PA	39,021	47.44%	120,275	47.41%	4,312,157	51.12%
UNP	30,983	37.67%	95,088	37.48%	3,602,748	42.71%
JVP	10,865	13.21%	33,739	13.30%	343,927	4.08%
Other Parties (with < 1%)	1,386	1.69%	4,576	1.80%	176,679	2.09%
Valid Votes	82,255	98.00%	253,678	97.93%	8,435,754	97.69%
Rejected Votes	1,675	2.00%	5,375	2.07%	199,536	2.31%
Total Polled	83,930	73.16%	259,053	72.69%	8,635,290	72.17%
Registered Electors	114,717		356,394		11,965,536	

=== 1994 Sri Lankan Presidential Election ===
Party	Thissamaharama		Hambantota Electoral District		Sri Lanka	
Party	Votes	%	Votes	%	Votes	%
PA	42,523	63.31%	132,873	61.52%	4,709,205	62.28%
UNP	23,102	34.39%	77,735	35.99%	2,715,283	35.91%
Other Parties (with < 1%)	1,543	2.30%	5,387	2.49%	137,040	1.81%
Valid Votes	67,168	97.91%	215,995	98.18%	7,561,526	98.03%
Rejected Votes	1,432	2.09%	4,013	1.82%	151,706	1.97%
Total Polled	68,600	64.31%	220,008	66.06%	7,713,232	69.12%
Registered Electors	106,669		333,054		11,158,880	

=== 1988 Sri Lankan Presidential Election ===
Party	Thissamaharama		Hambantota Electoral District		Sri Lanka	
Party	Votes	%	Votes	%	Votes	%
UNP	20,020	48.98%	41,198	49.62%	2,569,199	50.43%
SLFP	19,665	48.11%	39,343	47.39%	2,289,857	44.95%
SLMP	1,192	2.92%	2,478	2.98%	235,701	4.63%
Valid Votes	40,877	96.08%	83,019	95.56%	5,094,754	98.24%
Rejected Votes	1,667	3.92%	3,855	4.44%	91,499	1.76%
Total Polled	42,544	44.67%	86,874	29.40%	5,186,256	55.87%
Registered Electors	95,245		295,536		9,283,143	

=== 1982 Sri Lankan Presidential Election ===
Party	Thissamaharama		Hambantota Electoral District		Sri Lanka	
Party	Votes	%	Votes	%	Votes	%
UNP	25,656	47.21%	90,545	45.90%	3,450,815	52.93%
SLFP	20,624	37.95%	76,402	38.73%	2,546,348	39.05%
JVP	7,724	14.21%	28,835	14.62%	273,428	4.19%
Other Parties (with < 1%)	335	0.62%	1,496	0.76%	249,460	3.83%
Valid Votes	54,339	99.05%	197,278	99.09%	6,520,156	98.78%
Rejected Votes	523	0.95%	1,804	0.91%	80,470	1.22%
Total Polled	54,862	78.91%	199,082	81.37%	6,600,626	80.15%
Registered Electors	69,521		244,660		8,235,358	

== Parliamentary Election Results ==
=== Summary ===
The winner of Thissamaharama has matched the final country result 5 out of 7 times. Hence, Thissamaharama is a Weak Bellwether for Parliamentary Elections.

Year	Thissamaharama	Hambantota Electoral District	MAE %	Sri Lanka	MAE %
2015	UPFA	UPFA	2.47%	UNP	7.24%
2010	UPFA	UPFA	5.66%	UPFA	4.13%
2004	UPFA	UPFA	1.02%	UPFA	8.41%
2001	UNP	UNP	1.61%	UNP	3.81%
2000	UNP	UNP	2.44%	PA	6.69%
1994	PA	PA	0.15%	PA	4.71%
1989	UNP	UNP	1.50%	UNP	4.14%
Matches/Mean MAE	5/7	5/7	2.12%	7/7	5.59%

=== 2015 Sri Lankan Parliamentary Election ===
Party	Thissamaharama		Hambantota Electoral District		Sri Lanka	
Party	Votes	%	Votes	%	Votes	%
UPFA	63,950	51.33%	196,980	53.87%	4,732,664	42.48%
UNP	48,184	38.67%	130,433	35.67%	5,098,916	45.77%
JVP	12,031	9.66%	36,527	9.99%	544,154	4.88%
Other Parties (with < 1%)	424	0.34%	1,743	0.48%	82,845	0.74%
Valid Votes	124,589	97.23%	365,683	97.29%	11,140,333	95.35%
Rejected Votes	3,494	2.73%	10,056	2.68%	516,926	4.42%
Total Polled	128,132	78.22%	375,885	81.20%	11,684,111	77.66%
Registered Electors	163,818		462,911		15,044,490	

=== 2010 Sri Lankan Parliamentary Election ===
Party	Thissamaharama		Hambantota Electoral District		Sri Lanka	
Party	Votes	%	Votes	%	Votes	%
UPFA	52,058	56.99%	174,808	62.87%	4,846,388	60.38%
UNP	33,172	36.32%	83,027	29.86%	2,357,057	29.37%
DNA	5,751	6.30%	19,186	6.90%	441,251	5.50%
Other Parties (with < 1%)	360	0.39%	1,033	0.37%	23,385	0.29%
Valid Votes	91,341	96.03%	278,054	96.11%	8,026,322	96.03%
Rejected Votes	3,776	3.97%	11,240	3.89%	581,465	6.96%
Total Polled	95,117	66.23%	289,294	66.47%	8,358,246	59.29%
Registered Electors	143,622		435,218		14,097,690	

=== 2004 Sri Lankan Parliamentary Election ===
Party	Thissamaharama		Hambantota Electoral District		Sri Lanka	
Party	Votes	%	Votes	%	Votes	%
UPFA	57,861	63.04%	178,895	64.05%	4,223,126	45.70%
UNP	33,449	36.44%	98,877	35.40%	3,486,792	37.73%
Other Parties (with < 1%)	477	0.52%	1,538	0.55%	58,285	0.63%
Valid Votes	91,787	93.57%	279,310	94.03%	9,241,931	94.52%
Rejected Votes	6,311	6.43%	17,724	5.97%	534,452	5.47%
Total Polled	98,098	76.41%	297,034	77.28%	9,777,821	75.74%
Registered Electors	128,377		384,361		12,909,631	

=== 2001 Sri Lankan Parliamentary Election ===
Party	Thissamaharama		Hambantota Electoral District		Sri Lanka	
Party	Votes	%	Votes	%	Votes	%
UNP	37,939	41.51%	112,520	40.02%	4,086,026	45.62%
PA	32,159	35.18%	105,175	37.41%	3,330,815	37.19%
JVP	20,179	22.08%	59,693	21.23%	815,353	9.10%
Other Parties (with < 1%)	1,124	1.23%	3,774	1.34%	115,846	1.29%
Valid Votes	91,401	95.36%	281,162	95.46%	8,955,844	94.77%
Rejected Votes	4,451	4.64%	13,378	4.54%	494,009	5.23%
Total Polled	95,852	78.56%	294,540	79.81%	9,449,878	76.03%
Registered Electors	122,005		369,073		12,428,762	

=== 2000 Sri Lankan Parliamentary Election ===
Party	Thissamaharama		Hambantota Electoral District		Sri Lanka	
Party	Votes	%	Votes	%	Votes	%
UNP	41,169	45.94%	119,074	43.12%	3,451,765	40.12%
PA	33,181	37.02%	110,308	39.95%	3,899,329	45.33%
JVP	13,958	15.57%	42,042	15.23%	518,725	6.03%
Other Parties (with < 1%)	1,311	1.46%	4,703	1.70%	260,613	3.03%
Valid Votes	89,619	N/A	276,127	N/A	8,602,617	N/A

=== 1994 Sri Lankan Parliamentary Election ===
Party	Thissamaharama		Hambantota Electoral District		Sri Lanka	
Party	Votes	%	Votes	%	Votes	%
PA	41,739	53.42%	132,008	53.51%	3,887,805	48.94%
UNP	30,056	38.47%	95,382	38.67%	3,498,370	44.04%
SLPF	5,151	6.59%	15,309	6.21%	90,078	1.13%
Other Parties (with < 1%)	1,190	1.52%	3,980	1.61%	134,507	1.69%
Valid Votes	78,136	95.00%	246,679	94.80%	7,943,688	95.20%
Rejected Votes	4,116	5.00%	13,539	5.20%	400,395	4.80%
Total Polled	82,252	77.11%	260,218	78.19%	8,344,095	74.75%
Registered Electors	106,669		332,805		11,163,064	

=== 1989 Sri Lankan Parliamentary Election ===
Party	Thissamaharama		Hambantota Electoral District		Sri Lanka	
Party	Votes	%	Votes	%	Votes	%
UNP	13,406	54.72%	31,639	55.92%	2,838,005	50.71%
SLFP	9,273	37.85%	22,459	39.70%	1,785,369	31.90%
USA	1,492	6.09%	1,686	2.98%	141,983	2.54%
Other Parties (with < 1%)	329	1.34%	791	1.40%	221,166	3.95%
Valid Votes	24,500	90.44%	56,575	92.88%	5,596,468	93.87%
Rejected Votes	2,589	9.56%	4,339	7.12%	365,563	6.13%
Total Polled	27,089	28.75%	60,914	20.64%	5,962,031	63.60%
Registered Electors	94,234		295,120		9,374,164	

== Demographics ==
=== Ethnicity ===
The Thissamaharama Polling Division has a Sinhalese majority (93.3%) . In comparison, the Hambantota Electoral District (which contains the Thissamaharama Polling Division) has a Sinhalese majority (97.1%)

Ethnicity in Thissamaharama
1. Sinhalese (93.3%)
2. Malay (3.50%)
3. Moor (2.20%)
4. Other (1.00%)

=== Religion ===
The Thissamaharama Polling Division has a Buddhist majority (92.8%) . In comparison, the Hambantota Electoral District (which contains the Thissamaharama Polling Division) has a Buddhist majority (96.7%)

Religion in Thissamaharama
1. Buddhist (92.8%)
2. Muslim (5.90%)
3. Other (1.30%)
