= Tangalle Polling Division =

Tangalle
- Polling Division
- Coordinates: 6.116993°N 80.864196°E
- Country: Sri Lanka
- Province: Southern Province, Sri Lanka
- Electoral District: Hambantota Electoral District

Area
  - Total: 511.85 km^{2} (197.63 sq mi)

Population (2012)
  - Total: 193,751
  - Density: 379/km^{2} (980/sq mi)
- ISO 3166 code: EC-09C

The Tangalle Polling Division is a Polling Division in the Hambantota Electoral District, in the Southern Province, Sri Lanka.

== Presidential Election Results ==
=== Summary ===
The party that secures Tangalle will often secure the election as a whole. Hence, Tangalle has been considered a Bellwether for Presidential Elections.

Year	Tangalle	Hambantota Electoral District	MAE %	Sri Lanka	MAE %
2019	SLPP	SLPP	3.51%	SLPP	17.90%
2015	UPFA	UPFA	2.11%	NDF	17.31%
2010	UPFA	UPFA	3.31%	UPFA	12.28%
2005	UPFA	UPFA	2.86%	UPFA	15.86%
1999	PA	PA	1.17%	PA	5.57%
1994	PA	PA	1.04%	PA	0.55%
1988	UNP	UNP	0.34%	UNP	1.89%
1982	UNP	UNP	2.40%	UNP	5.68%
Matches/Mean MAE	7/8	7/8	2.09%	8/8	9.63%

=== 2019 Sri Lankan Presidential Election ===
Party	Tangalle		Hambantota Electoral District		Sri Lanka	
Party	Votes	%	Votes	%	Votes	%
SLPP	72,673	69.53%	278,804	66.17%	6,924,255	52.25%
NDF	22,141	21.18%	108,906	25.85%	5,564,239	41.99%
NMPP	7,830	7.49%	26,295	6.24%	418,553	3.16%
Other Parties (with < 1%)	1,881	1.80%	7,369	1.75%	345,452	2.61%
Valid Votes	104,525	99.34%	421,374	99.25%	13,252,499	98.99%
Rejected Votes	696	0.66%	3,179	0.75%	135,452	1.01%
Total Polled	105,221	86.81%	424,553	87.36%	13,387,951	83.71%
Registered Electors	121,212		485,986		15,992,568	

=== 2015 Sri Lankan Presidential Election ===
Party	Tangalle		Hambantota Electoral District		Sri Lanka	
Party	Votes	%	Votes	%	Votes	%
UPFA	62,739	65.18%	243,295	63.02%	5,768,090	47.58%
NDF	32,598	33.87%	138,708	35.93%	6,217,162	51.28%
Other Parties (with < 1%)	911	0.95%	4,073	1.05%	138,200	1.14%
Valid Votes	96,248	99.12%	386,076	99.14%	12,123,452	98.85%
Rejected Votes	851	0.88%	3,351	0.86%	140,925	1.15%
Total Polled	97,099	80.82%	389,427	81.23%	12,264,377	78.69%
Registered Electors	120,148		479,433		15,585,942	

=== 2010 Sri Lankan Presidential Election ===
Party	Tangalle		Hambantota Electoral District		Sri Lanka	
Party	Votes	%	Votes	%	Votes	%
UPFA	60,082	70.59%	226,887	67.21%	6,015,934	57.88%
NDF	23,729	27.88%	105,336	31.20%	4,173,185	40.15%
Other Parties (with < 1%)	1,308	1.54%	5,341	1.58%	204,494	1.97%
Valid Votes	85,119	99.40%	337,564	99.35%	10,393,613	99.03%
Rejected Votes	511	0.60%	2,218	0.65%	101,838	0.97%
Total Polled	85,630	78.27%	339,782	78.29%	10,495,451	66.70%
Registered Electors	109,409		433,991		15,734,587	

=== 2005 Sri Lankan Presidential Election ===
Party	Tangalle		Hambantota Electoral District		Sri Lanka	
Party	Votes	%	Votes	%	Votes	%
UPFA	53,291	66.35%	202,918	63.43%	4,887,152	50.29%
UNP	25,992	32.36%	112,712	35.23%	4,706,366	48.43%
Other Parties (with < 1%)	1,036	1.29%	4,295	1.34%	123,521	1.27%
Valid Votes	80,319	99.14%	319,925	99.09%	9,717,039	98.88%
Rejected Votes	695	0.86%	2,928	0.91%	109,869	1.12%
Total Polled	81,014	79.42%	322,853	79.47%	9,826,908	69.51%
Registered Electors	102,009		406,270		14,136,979	

=== 1999 Sri Lankan Presidential Election ===
Party	Tangalle		Hambantota Electoral District		Sri Lanka	
Party	Votes	%	Votes	%	Votes	%
PA	29,828	47.19%	120,275	47.41%	4,312,157	51.12%
UNP	22,431	35.48%	95,088	37.48%	3,602,748	42.71%
JVP	9,887	15.64%	33,739	13.30%	343,927	4.08%
Other Parties (with < 1%)	1,068	1.69%	4,576	1.80%	176,679	2.09%
Valid Votes	63,214	98.10%	253,678	97.93%	8,435,754	97.69%
Rejected Votes	1,222	1.90%	5,375	2.07%	199,536	2.31%
Total Polled	64,436	72.28%	259,053	72.69%	8,635,290	72.17%
Registered Electors	89,147		356,394		11,965,536	

=== 1994 Sri Lankan Presidential Election ===
Party	Tangalle		Hambantota Electoral District		Sri Lanka	
Party	Votes	%	Votes	%	Votes	%
PA	33,442	62.62%	132,873	61.52%	4,709,205	62.28%
UNP	18,680	34.98%	77,735	35.99%	2,715,283	35.91%
Other Parties (with < 1%)	1,283	2.40%	5,387	2.49%	137,040	1.81%
Valid Votes	53,405	98.54%	215,995	98.18%	7,561,526	98.03%
Rejected Votes	789	1.46%	4,013	1.82%	151,706	1.97%
Total Polled	54,194	66.97%	220,008	66.06%	7,713,232	69.12%
Registered Electors	80,917		333,054		11,158,880	

=== 1988 Sri Lankan Presidential Election ===
Party	Tangalle		Hambantota Electoral District		Sri Lanka	
Party	Votes	%	Votes	%	Votes	%
UNP	8,292	49.10%	41,198	49.62%	2,569,199	50.43%
SLFP	8,026	47.53%	39,343	47.39%	2,289,857	44.95%
SLMP	569	3.37%	2,478	2.98%	235,701	4.63%
Valid Votes	16,887	94.37%	83,019	95.56%	5,094,754	98.24%
Rejected Votes	1,007	5.63%	3,855	4.44%	91,499	1.76%
Total Polled	17,894	25.41%	86,874	29.40%	5,186,256	55.87%
Registered Electors	70,422		295,536		9,283,143	

=== 1982 Sri Lankan Presidential Election ===
Party	Tangalle		Hambantota Electoral District		Sri Lanka	
Party	Votes	%	Votes	%	Votes	%
UNP	23,196	46.64%	90,545	45.90%	3,450,815	52.93%
SLFP	17,253	34.69%	76,402	38.73%	2,546,348	39.05%
JVP	8,966	18.03%	28,835	14.62%	273,428	4.19%
Other Parties (with < 1%)	318	0.64%	1,496	0.76%	249,460	3.83%
Valid Votes	49,733	99.21%	197,278	99.09%	6,520,156	98.78%
Rejected Votes	397	0.79%	1,804	0.91%	80,470	1.22%
Total Polled	50,130	85.41%	199,082	81.37%	6,600,626	80.15%
Registered Electors	58,690		244,660		8,235,358	

== Parliamentary Election Results ==
=== Summary ===
The winner of Tangalle has matched the final country result 3 out of 7 times.

Year	Tangalle	Hambantota Electoral District	MAE %	Sri Lanka	MAE %
2015	UPFA	UPFA	2.71%	UNP	12.50%
2010	UPFA	UPFA	4.13%	UPFA	5.43%
2004	UPFA	UPFA	4.03%	UPFA	12.64%
2001	PA	UNP	2.52%	UNP	6.03%
2000	UNP	UNP	1.36%	PA	3.77%
1994	PA	PA	0.89%	PA	5.55%
1989	SLFP	UNP	11.64%	UNP	9.95%
Matches/Mean MAE	3/7	5/7	3.90%	7/7	7.98%

=== 2015 Sri Lankan Parliamentary Election ===
Party	Tangalle		Hambantota Electoral District		Sri Lanka	
Party	Votes	%	Votes	%	Votes	%
UPFA	50,697	55.86%	196,980	53.87%	4,732,664	42.48%
UNP	28,700	31.62%	130,433	35.67%	5,098,916	45.77%
JVP	10,842	11.95%	36,527	9.99%	544,154	4.88%
Other Parties (with < 1%)	517	0.57%	1,743	0.48%	82,845	0.74%
Valid Votes	90,756	97.35%	365,683	97.29%	11,140,333	95.35%
Rejected Votes	2,430	2.61%	10,056	2.68%	516,926	4.42%
Total Polled	93,224	77.59%	375,885	81.20%	11,684,111	77.66%
Registered Electors	120,148		462,911		15,044,490	

=== 2010 Sri Lankan Parliamentary Election ===
Party	Tangalle		Hambantota Electoral District		Sri Lanka	
Party	Votes	%	Votes	%	Votes	%
UPFA	46,289	66.95%	174,808	62.87%	4,846,388	60.38%
UNP	17,174	24.84%	83,027	29.86%	2,357,057	29.37%
DNA	5,449	7.88%	19,186	6.90%	441,251	5.50%
Other Parties (with < 1%)	230	0.33%	1,033	0.37%	23,385	0.29%
Valid Votes	69,142	96.45%	278,054	96.11%	8,026,322	96.03%
Rejected Votes	2,547	3.55%	11,240	3.89%	581,465	6.96%
Total Polled	71,689	65.52%	289,294	66.47%	8,358,246	59.29%
Registered Electors	109,409		435,218		14,097,690	

=== 2004 Sri Lankan Parliamentary Election ===
Party	Tangalle		Hambantota Electoral District		Sri Lanka	
Party	Votes	%	Votes	%	Votes	%
UPFA	48,744	68.15%	178,895	64.05%	4,223,126	45.70%
UNP	22,472	31.42%	98,877	35.40%	3,486,792	37.73%
Other Parties (with < 1%)	312	0.44%	1,538	0.55%	58,285	0.63%
Valid Votes	71,528	94.55%	279,310	94.03%	9,241,931	94.52%
Rejected Votes	4,121	5.45%	17,724	5.97%	534,452	5.47%
Total Polled	75,649	76.90%	297,034	77.28%	9,777,821	75.74%
Registered Electors	98,376		384,361		12,909,631	

=== 2001 Sri Lankan Parliamentary Election ===
Party	Tangalle		Hambantota Electoral District		Sri Lanka	
Party	Votes	%	Votes	%	Votes	%
PA	26,745	37.66%	105,175	37.41%	3,330,815	37.19%
UNP	25,539	35.96%	112,520	40.02%	4,086,026	45.62%
JVP	17,744	24.99%	59,693	21.23%	815,353	9.10%
Other Parties (with < 1%)	984	1.39%	3,774	1.34%	115,846	1.29%
Valid Votes	71,012	95.91%	281,162	95.46%	8,955,844	94.77%
Rejected Votes	3,028	4.09%	13,378	4.54%	494,009	5.23%
Total Polled	74,040	78.66%	294,540	79.81%	9,449,878	76.03%
Registered Electors	94,126		369,073		12,428,762	

=== 2000 Sri Lankan Parliamentary Election ===
Party	Tangalle		Hambantota Electoral District		Sri Lanka	
Party	Votes	%	Votes	%	Votes	%
UNP	28,755	41.20%	119,074	43.12%	3,451,765	40.12%
PA	27,595	39.54%	110,308	39.95%	3,899,329	45.33%
JVP	12,298	17.62%	42,042	15.23%	518,725	6.03%
Other Parties (with < 1%)	1,142	1.64%	4,703	1.70%	260,613	3.03%
Valid Votes	69,790	N/A	276,127	N/A	8,602,617	N/A

=== 1994 Sri Lankan Parliamentary Election ===
Party	Tangalle		Hambantota Electoral District		Sri Lanka	
Party	Votes	%	Votes	%	Votes	%
PA	33,090	54.34%	132,008	53.51%	3,887,805	48.94%
UNP	22,882	37.58%	95,382	38.67%	3,498,370	44.04%
SLPF	4,054	6.66%	15,309	6.21%	90,078	1.13%
Other Parties (with < 1%)	869	1.43%	3,980	1.61%	134,507	1.69%
Valid Votes	60,895	94.95%	246,679	94.80%	7,943,688	95.20%
Rejected Votes	3,239	5.05%	13,539	5.20%	400,395	4.80%
Total Polled	64,134	79.26%	260,218	78.19%	8,344,095	74.75%
Registered Electors	80,917		332,805		11,163,064	

=== 1989 Sri Lankan Parliamentary Election ===
Party	Tangalle		Hambantota Electoral District		Sri Lanka	
Party	Votes	%	Votes	%	Votes	%
SLFP	1,948	53.41%	22,459	39.70%	1,785,369	31.90%
UNP	1,640	44.97%	31,639	55.92%	2,838,005	50.71%
Other Parties (with < 1%)	59	1.62%	2,477	4.38%	363,149	6.49%
Valid Votes	3,647	79.14%	56,575	92.88%	5,596,468	93.87%
Rejected Votes	961	20.86%	4,339	7.12%	365,563	6.13%
Total Polled	4,608	6.65%	60,914	20.64%	5,962,031	63.60%
Registered Electors	69,327		295,120		9,374,164	

== Demographics ==
=== Ethnicity ===
The Tangalle Polling Division has a Sinhalese majority (98.4%) . In comparison, the Hambantota Electoral District (which contains the Tangalle Polling Division) has a Sinhalese majority (97.1%)

Ethnicity in Tangalle
1. Sinhalese (98.4%)
2. Other (1.60%)

=== Religion ===
The Tangalle Polling Division has a Buddhist majority (98.0%) . In comparison, the Hambantota Electoral District (which contains the Tangalle Polling Division) has a Buddhist majority (96.7%)

Religion in Tangalle
1. Buddhist (98.0%)
2. Muslim (1.30%)
3. Other (0.70%)
