= Vijitha Ranaweera =

Sri Lankan politician

Hon. Vijitha Ranaweera

Member of Parliament for Hambantota District
- In office 2004–2010

Personal details
- Party: Janatha Vimukthi Peramuna

Vijitha Ranaweera is a Sri Lankan politician and a former member of the Parliament of Sri Lanka.
