= Aravinda Vitharana =

Sri Lankan politician

Aravinda Vitharana is a Sri Lankan politician. He was elected to the Sri Lankan Parliament from Hambantota Electoral District as a member of the National People's Power.
