= Hambantota Electoral District =

Electoral district in Sri Lanka

Hambantota
- Electoral District for the Parliament of Sri Lanka
- Administrative District: Hambantota
- Province: Southern
- Polling divisions: 4
- Population: 558,000 (2008)
- Electorate: 421,186 (2010)
- Area: 2,609 km^{2} (1,007 sq mi)

Current Electoral District
- Number of members: 7
- MPs: NPP (5) Nihal Galappaththi; Athula Hewage; Saliya Madarasinghe; Aravinda Vitharana; Prabha Senarath SJB (1) Dilip Wedaarachchi SLPP (1) D. V. Chanaka

Hambantota electoral district is one of the 22 multi-member electoral districts of Sri Lanka created by the 1978 Constitution of Sri Lanka. The district is conterminous with the administrative district of Hambantota in the Southern province. The district currently elects 7 of the 225 members of the Sri Lankan Parliament and had 421,186 registered electors in 2010. The district is Sri Lanka's Electorate Number 09.

== Polling Divisions ==
The Hambantota Electoral District consists of the following polling divisions:

A: Mulkirigala

B: Beliatta

C: Tangalle

D: Tissamaharama

== 1982 Presidential Election ==
Results of the 1st presidential election held on 20 October 1982 for the district:

Candidate	Party	Votes per Polling Division				Postal Votes	Total Votes	%
Candidate	Party	Beli- atta	Mulkiri -gala	Tan- galla	Tissama -harama	Postal Votes	Total Votes	%
Junius Jayewardene	UNP	21,056	18,964	23,196	25,656	1,673	90,545	45.90%
Hector Kobbekaduwa	SLFP	18,150	19,605	17,253	20,624	770	76,402	38.73%
Rohana Wijeweera	JVP	5,957	5,966	8,966	7,724	222	28,835	14.62%
Colvin R. de Silva	LSSP	227	247	183	212	8	877	0.44%
Vasudeva Nanayakkara	NSSP	78	114	78	65	9	344	0.17%
Kumar Ponnambalam	ACTC	63	97	57	58	0	275	0.14%
Valid Votes		45,531	44,993	49,733	54,339	2,682	197,278	100.00%
Rejected Votes		378	484	397	523	22	1,804	
Total Polled		45,909	45,477	50,130	54,862	2,704	199,082	
Registered Electors		56,254	57,491	58,690	69,521		241,956	
Turnout		81.61%	79.10%	85.41%	78.91%		82.28%	

== 1988 Presidential Election ==
Results of the 2nd presidential election held on 19 December 1988 for the district:

Candidate	Party	Votes per Polling Division				Postal Votes	Total Votes	%
Candidate	Party	Beli- atta	Mulkiri -gala	Tan- galla	Tissama -harama	Postal Votes	Total Votes	%
Ranasinghe Premadasa	UNP	6,793	5,952	8,292	20,020	141	41,198	49.62%
Sirimavo Bandaranaike	SLFP	5,733	5,740	8,026	19,665	179	39,343	47.39%
Oswin Abeygunasekara	SLMP	326	382	569	1,192	9	2,478	2.98%
Valid Votes		12,852	12,074	16,887	40,877	329	83,019	100.00%
Rejected Votes		491	663	1,007	1,667	27	3,855	
Total Polled		13,343	12,737	17,894	42,544	356	86,874	
Registered Electors		62,773	66,740	70,422	95,245		295,180	
Turnout		21.26%	19.08%	25.41%	44.67%		29.43%	

== 1989 Parliamentary General Election ==
Results of the 9th parliamentary election held on 15 February 1989 for the district:

Party	Votes per Polling Division				Postal Votes	Total Votes	%	Seats
Party	Beli- atta	Mulkiri -gala	Tan- galla	Tissama -harama	Postal Votes	Total Votes	%	Seats
United National Party	6,235	8,653	1,640	13,406	1,705	31,639	55.92%	5
Sri Lanka Freedom Party	4,418	5,581	1,948	9,273	1,239	22,459	39.70%	2
United Socialist Alliance (CPSL, LSSP, NSSP, SLMP)	18	111	25	1,492	40	1,686	2.98%	0
Mahajana Eksath Peramuna	242	85	29	224	68	648	1.15%	0
Sri Lanka Muslim Congress	3	24	5	105	6	143	0.25%	0
Valid Votes	10,916	14,454	3,647	24,500	3,058	56,575	100.00%	7
Rejected Votes	204	404	961	2,589	181	4,339		
Total Polled	11,120	14,858	4,608	27,089	3,239	60,914		
Registered Electors	61,466	66,111	69,327	94,234	3,982	295,120		
Turnout	18.09%	22.47%	6.65%	28.75%	81.34%	20.64%		

The following candidates were elected: Mahinda Rajapaksa (SLFP), 13,073 preference votes (pv); Ranjit Atapattu (UNP), 10,381 pv; Chamal Rajapaksa (SLFP), 10,342 pv; Kadukannage Ananda Kularatne (UNP), 9,470 pv; Patabandi Madduma Baduge Cyril (UNP), 5,911 pv; Abeydheera Hary (UNP), 5,699 pv; and Gunapala Tissakuttiarachchi (UNP), 3,600 pv.

== 1993 Provincial Council Election ==
Results of the 2nd Southern provincial council election held on 17 May 1993 for the district:

Party	Votes	%	Seats
United National Party	102,841	49.85%	
People's Alliance (SLFP et al.)	63,919	30.98%	
Democratic United National Front	32,882	15.94%	
Independent 1	4,266	2.07%	
Nava Sama Samaja Party	1,859	0.90%	
Others	533	0.26%	
Valid Votes	206,300	100.00%	
Rejected Votes	17,789		
Total Polled	224,089		
Registered Electors	323,653		
Turnout	69.24%		

== 1994 Provincial Council Election ==
Results of the 3rd Southern provincial council election held on 24 March 1994 for the district:

Party	Votes	%	Seats
People's Alliance (SLFP et al.)	118,889	53.95%	
United National Party	96,118	43.62%	
Nava Sama Samaja Party	2,703	1.23%	
Independent	2,650	1.20%	
Valid Votes	220,360	100.00%	
Rejected Votes	14,828		
Total Polled	235,188		
Registered Electors	323,653		
Turnout	72.67%		

== 1994 Parliamentary General Election ==
Results of the 10th parliamentary election held on 16 August 1994 for the district:

Party	Votes per Polling Division				Postal Votes	Total Votes	%	Seats
Party	Beli- atta	Mulkiri -gala	Tan- galla	Tissama -harama	Postal Votes	Total Votes	%	Seats
People's Alliance (SLFP et al.)	25,501	28,181	33,090	41,739	3,497	132,008	53.51%	4
United National Party	18,643	22,078	22,882	30,056	1,723	95,382	38.67%	2
Sri Lanka Progressive Front (JVP)	3,169	2,679	4,054	5,151	256	15,309	6.21%	1
Mahajana Eksath Peramuna	680	288	443	554	115	2,080	0.84%	0
Independent 1	154	298	230	315	0	997	0.40%	0
Independent 2	112	117	113	126	0	468	0.19%	0
Sinhalaye Mahasammatha Bhoomiputra Pakshaya	49	32	32	149	5	267	0.11%	0
People's Freedom Front	23	47	51	46	1	168	0.07%	0
Valid Votes	48,331	53,720	60,895	78,136	5,597	246,679	100.00%	7
Rejected Votes	2,333	3,763	3,239	4,116	88	13,539		
Total Polled	50,664	57,483	64,134	82,252	5,685	260,218		
Registered Electors	66,091	73,236	80,917	106,669		326,913		
Turnout	76.66%	78.49%	79.26%	77.11%		79.60%		

The following candidates were elected: Mahinda Rajapaksa (PA), 78,977 preference votes (pv); Chamal Rajapaksa (PA), 63,698 pv; Nirupama Rajapaksa (PA), 46,034 pv; Mahinda Amaraweera (PA), 39,376 pv; Ananda Kularatne K. (UNP), 36,965 pv; Mervyn Silva (UNP), 36,338 pv; and Janith Priyantha Vidyathilaka Vipulaguna (SLPF-JVP), 1,791 pv.

Janith Vipulaguna (SLPF-JVP) resigned and was replaced by Nihal Galappaththi (SLPF-JVP).

== 1994 Presidential Election ==
Results of the 3rd presidential election held on 9 November 1994 for the district:

Candidate	Party	Votes per Polling Division				Postal Votes	Total Votes	%
Candidate	Party	Beli- atta	Mulkiri -gala	Tan- galla	Tissama -harama	Postal Votes	Total Votes	%
Chandrika Kumaratunga	PA	26,335	26,535	33,442	42,523	4,038	132,873	61.52%
Srimathi Dissanayake	UNP	16,150	17,983	18,680	23,102	1,820	77,735	35.99%
Nihal Galappaththi	SLPF	285	389	462	478	71	1,685	0.78%
Harischandra Wijayatunga	SMBP	294	389	332	478	45	1,538	0.71%
Hudson Samarasinghe	Ind 2	273	419	319	390	13	1,414	0.65%
A.J. Ranashinge	Ind 1	165	194	170	197	24	750	0.35%
Valid Votes		43,502	45,909	53,405	67,168	6,011	215,995	100.00%
Rejected Votes		652	1,010	789	1,432	130	4,013	
Total Polled		44,154	46,919	54,194	68,600	6,141	220,008	
Registered Electors		66,091	73,236	80,917	106,669		326,913	
Turnout		66.81%	64.07%	66.97%	64.31%		67.30%	

== 1999 Provincial Council Election ==
Results of the 4th Southern provincial council election held on 10 June 1999 for the district:

Party	Votes	%	Seats
People's Alliance (SLFP, SLMC et al.)	89,483	39.11%	6
United National Party	82,786	36.19%	5
Janatha Vimukthi Peramuna	47,296	20.67%	3
New Left Front (NSSP et al.)	4,869	2.13%	0
Independent 1	2,603	1.14%	0
Mahajana Eksath Peramuna	1,044	0.46%	0
People's Liberation Solidarity Front	324	0.14%	0
Liberal Party	150	0.07%	0
Independent 2	134	0.06%	0
Independent 3	87	0.04%	0
Valid Votes	228,776	100.00%	14
Rejected Votes			
Total Polled			
Registered Electors	342,498		
Turnout			

== 1999 Presidential Election ==
Results of the 4th presidential election held on 21 December 1999 for the district:

Candidate	Party	Votes per Polling Division				Postal Votes	Total Votes	%
Candidate	Party	Beli- atta	Mulkiri -gala	Tan- galla	Tissama -harama	Postal Votes	Total Votes	%
Chandrika Kumaratunga	PA	24,492	24,728	29,828	39,021	2,206	120,275	47.41%
Ranil Wickremasinghe	UNP	18,140	21,426	22,431	30,983	2,108	95,088	37.48%
Nandana Gunathilake	JVP	5,691	6,298	9,887	10,865	998	33,739	13.30%
Harischandra Wijayatunga	SMBP	136	187	171	202	37	733	0.29%
Rajiva Wijesinha	Liberal	116	198	181	229	5	729	0.29%
W.V.M. Ranjith	Ind 2	118	227	174	180	1	700	0.28%
T. Edirisuriya	Ind 1	101	180	149	249	12	691	0.27%
Vasudeva Nanayakkara	LDA	81	125	119	121	37	483	0.19%
Kamal Karunadasa	PLSF	80	108	98	130	5	421	0.17%
Abdul Rasool	SLMP	69	68	72	134	3	346	0.14%
Hudson Samarasinghe	Ind 3	40	47	43	61	1	192	0.08%
A. Dissanayaka	DUNF	37	38	39	45	1	160	0.06%
A.W. Premawardhana	PFF	29	34	22	35	1	121	0.05%
Valid Votes		49,130	53,664	63,214	82,255	5,415	253,678	100.00%
Rejected Votes		919	1,389	1,222	1,675	170	5,375	
Total Polled		50,049	55,053	64,436	83,930	5,585	259,053	
Registered Electors		68,349	78,596	89,147	114,717		350,809	
Turnout		73.23%	70.05%	72.28%	73.16%		73.84%	

== 2000 Parliamentary General Election ==
Results of the 11th parliamentary election held on 10 October 2000 for the district:

Party	Votes per Polling Division				Postal Votes	Total Votes	%	Seats
Party	Beli- atta	Mulkiri -gala	Tan- galla	Tissama -harama	Postal Votes	Total Votes	%	Seats
United National Party	20,221	26,409	28,755	41,169	2,520	119,074	43.12%	4
People's Alliance (SLFP et al.)	22,406	24,401	27,595	33,181	2,725	110,308	39.95%	2
Janatha Vimukthi Peramuna	7,192	7,191	12,298	13,958	1,403	42,042	15.23%	1
New Left Front (NSSP et al.)	306	427	432	458	6	1,629	0.59%	0
Sinhala Heritage	157	432	230	208	52	1,079	0.39%	0
Citizen's Front	105	106	94	166	7	478	0.17%	0
United Sinhala Great Council	48	100	101	142	1	392	0.14%	0
Independent 5	49	62	64	69	1	245	0.09%	0
Sinhalaye Mahasammatha Bhoomiputra Pakshaya	37	33	37	64	13	184	0.07%	0
Liberal Party	26	21	62	44	1	154	0.06%	0
Democratic United National Front	29	33	38	39	0	139	0.05%	0
Independent 4	30	35	23	28	0	116	0.04%	0
Independent 2	20	20	25	26	2	93	0.03%	0
Independent 3	10	22	12	32	1	77	0.03%	0
Independent 1	10	10	9	15	1	45	0.02%	0
Sri Lanka Progressive Front	8	14	7	11	2	42	0.02%	0
People's Freedom Front	6	7	8	9	0	30	0.01%	0
Valid Votes	50,660	59,323	69,790	89,619	6,735	276,127	100.00%	7
Rejected Votes	2,462	3,561	3,227	4,441	124	13,815		
Total Polled	53,122	62,884	73,017	94,060	6,859	289,942		
Registered Electors	69,413	80,283	91,814	118,516		360,026		
Turnout	76.53%	78.33%	79.53%	79.36%		80.53%		

The following candidates were elected: Sajith Premadasa (UNP), 98,968 preference votes (pv); Mahinda Rajapaksa (PA), 88,726 pv; Chamal Rajapaksa (PA), 66,737 pv; Dilip Wedaarachchi (UNP), 43,949 pv; Siri Alexander Andrahennady (UNP), 39,674 pv; Kadukannage Ananda Kularatne (UNP), 27,618 pv; and Nihal Galappaththi (JVP), 4,654 pv.

== 2001 Parliamentary General Election ==
Results of the 12th parliamentary election held on 5 December 2001 for the district:

Party	Votes per Polling Division				Postal Votes	Total Votes	%	Seats
Party	Beli- atta	Mulkiri -gala	Tan- galla	Tissama -harama	Postal Votes	Total Votes	%	Seats
United National Front (UNP, SLMC, CWC, WPF)	20,457	25,854	25,539	37,939		112,520	40.02%	4
People's Alliance (SLFP et al.)	21,272	22,625	26,745	32,159		105,175	37.41%	2
Janatha Vimukthi Peramuna	9,385	10,600	17,744	20,179		59,693	21.23%	1
New Left Front (NSSP et al.)	399	514	505	671		2,101	0.75%	0
Sinhala Heritage	111	159	219	157		679	0.24%	0
United Lalith Front	60	88	86	101		336	0.12%	0
Independent 1	23	41	41	38		143	0.05%	0
United Sinhala Great Council	20	34	29	43		126	0.04%	0
Peoples Freedom Front	24	19	45	32		121	0.04%	0
Independent 3	20	29	17	26		93	0.03%	0
Sri Lanka National Front	11	15	19	17		62	0.02%	0
Sri Lanka Progressive Front	14	14	10	21		60	0.02%	0
Independent 2	6	15	13	18		53	0.02%	0
Valid Votes	51,802	60,007	71,012	91,401		281,162	100.00%	7
Rejected Votes	2,484	3,302	3,028	4,451		13,378		
Total Polled	54,286	63,309	74,040	95,852		294,540		
Registered Electors	70,560	82,382	94,126	122,005		369,073		
Turnout	76.94%	76.85%	78.66%	78.56%		79.81%		

The following candidates were elected: Sajith Premadasa (UNF), 92,536 preference votes (pv); Mahinda Rajapaksa (PA), 81,855 pv; Chamal Rajapaksa (PA), 48,473 pv; Dilip Wedaarachchi (UNF), 38,972 pv; Siri Alexander Andrahennady (UNF), 26,644 pv; Kadukannage Ananda Kularatne (UNF), 24,811 pv; and Nihal Galappaththi (JVP), 4,514 pv.

== 2004 Parliamentary General Election ==
Results of the 13th parliamentary election held on 2 April 2004 for the district:

Party	Votes per Polling Division				Postal Votes	Total Votes	%	Seats
Party	Beli- atta	Mulkiri -gala	Tan- galla	Tissama -harama	Postal Votes	Total Votes	%	Seats
United People's Freedom Alliance (SLFP, JVP et al.)	32,017	34,604	48,744	57,861	5,669	178,895	64.05%	5
United National Front (UNP, SLMC, CWC, WPF)	17,631	22,582	22,472	33,449	2,743	98,877	35.40%	2
National Development Front	68	70	68	121	1	328	0.12%	0
United Lalith Front	49	61	54	82	6	252	0.09%	0
United Socialist Party	44	51	60	83	1	239	0.09%	0
New Left Front (NSSP et al.)	39	86	27	36	7	195	0.07%	0
Independent 8	35	38	37	28	1	139	0.05%	0
Sinhalaye Mahasammatha Bhoomiputra Pakshaya	29	15	14	31	16	105	0.04%	0
Independent 5	9	19	8	26	0	62	0.02%	0
Independent 1	20	3	8	9	1	41	0.01%	0
Independent 2	10	7	6	7	2	32	0.01%	0
Swarajya	5	8	7	11	0	31	0.01%	0
Independent 7	3	12	4	7	0	26	0.01%	0
Sri Lanka National Front	3	6	6	9	2	26	0.01%	0
Independent 3	5	3	3	11	1	23	0.01%	0
Independent 6	6	0	4	11	0	21	0.01%	0
Sri Lanka Progressive Front	2	2	6	1	1	12	0.00%	0
Independent 4	1	1	0	4	0	6	0.00%	0
Valid Votes	49,976	57,568	71,528	91,787	8,451	279,310	100.00%	7
Rejected Votes	2,717	4,438	4,121	6,311	137	17,724		
Total Polled	52,693	62,006	75,649	98,098	8,588	297,034		
Registered Electors	72,045	85,563	98,376	128,377		384,361		
Turnout	73.14%	72.47%	76.90%	76.41%		77.28%		

The following candidates were elected: Mahinda Rajapaksa (UPFA-SLFP), 107,603 preference votes (pv); Nihal Galappaththi (UPFA-JVP), 96,039 pv; Vijitha Ranaweera (UPFA-JVP), 86,184 pv; Sajith Premadasa (UNF-UNP), 82,968 pv; Mahinda Amaraweera (UPFA-SLFP), 63,118 pv; Chamal Rajapaksa (UPFA-SLFP), 56,416 pv; and Dilip Wedaarachchi (UNF-UNP), 40,738 pv.

Mahinda Rajapaksa (UPFA-SLFP) resigned on 19 November 2005 to take up presidency. His replacement Nirupama Rajapaksa (UPFA-SLFP) was sworn in on 25 November 2005.

== 2004 Provincial Council Election ==
Results of the 5th Southern provincial council election held on 10 July 2004 for the district:

Party	Votes per Polling Division				Postal Votes	Total Votes	%	Seats
Party	Beli- atta	Mulkiri -gala	Tan- galla	Tissama -harama	Postal Votes	Total Votes	%	Seats
United People's Freedom Alliance (SLFP, JVP et al.)	26,938	25,531	38,212	47,251	3,351	141,283	70.12%	8
United National Party	10,647	12,270	13,153	21,028	1,229	58,327	28.95%	4
United Socialist Party	177	199	225	394	9	1,004	0.50%	0
Independent 3	72	71	83	86	1	313	0.16%	0
National Development Front	52	69	55	88	3	267	0.13%	0
Sinhalaye Mahasammatha Bhoomiputra Pakshaya	15	15	20	17	11	78	0.04%	0
United Sinhala Great Council	10	7	19	19	1	56	0.03%	0
Independent 1	11	12	10	15	2	50	0.02%	0
Independent 2	7	14	8	17	0	46	0.02%	0
Sri Lanka Progressive Front	7	10	10	11	5	43	0.02%	0
Sri Lanka National Front	7	6	5	10	1	29	0.01%	0
Valid Votes	37,943	38,204	51,800	68,936	4,613	201,496	100.00%	12
Rejected Votes	2,379	2,574	3,550	5,025	197	13,725		
Total Polled	40,322	40,778	55,350	73,961	4,810	215,221		
Registered Electors	72,045	85,563	98,376	128,377		384,361		
Turnout	55.97%	47.66%	56.26%	57.61%		55.99%		

The following candidates were elected: Piyasena Ramanayake (UPFA), 55,780 preference votes (pv); Wahalathanthrige Sisisra Kumara (UPFA), 47,697 pv; Ajith Rajapakse (UPFA), 36,546 pv; Athula Welandagoda Hewage (UPFA), 35,153 pv; Wehella Kankanamge Indika (UPFA), 30,198 pv; Hewa Wellalage Gunasena (UPFA), 25,730 pv; Jayantha Wanniarachchi (UPFA), 25,215 pv; D.V.R. Priya Upul (UPFA), 22,738 pv; Thennakoon Gamage Senarathne (UNP), 21,202 pv; Ekanayake Somapala (UNP), 18,775 pv; Dewaka Weerasinghe Puwakdandawa Muneendradasa (UNP), 13,228 pv; and Nimal Lalchandra Punchihewage (UNP), 12,166 pv.

== 2005 Presidential Election ==
Results of the 5th presidential election held on 17 November 2005 for the district:

Candidate	Party	Votes per Polling Division				Postal Votes	Total Votes	%
Candidate	Party	Beli- atta	Mulkiri -gala	Tan- galla	Tissama -harama	Postal Votes	Total Votes	%
Mahinda Rajapaksa	UPFA	36,615	42,897	53,291	63,197	6,918	202,918	63.43%
Ranil Wickremasinghe	UNP	19,290	24,784	25,992	40,006	2,640	112,712	35.23%
A.A. Suraweera	NDF	247	298	307	364	1	1,217	0.38%
Siritunga Jayasuriya	USP	211	292	232	330	1	1,066	0.33%
Victor Hettigoda	ULPP	81	100	107	117	25	430	0.13%
Chamil Jayaneththi	NLF	57	84	93	133	3	370	0.12%
Aruna de Soyza	RPP	47	110	103	91	1	352	0.11%
Wimal Geeganage	SLNF	56	81	66	86	1	290	0.09%
A.K.J. Arachchige	DUA	38	52	41	65	0	196	0.06%
Anura De Silva	ULF	30	43	38	50	1	162	0.05%
P. Nelson Perera	SLPF	19	21	24	36	0	100	0.03%
Wije Dias	SEP	16	19	24	25	0	84	0.03%
H.S. Dharmadwaja	UNAF	6	8	1	13	0	28	0.01%
Valid Votes		56,713	68,789	80,319	104,513	9,591	319,925	100.00%
Rejected Votes		492	645	695	1,012	84	2,928	
Total Polled		57,205	69,434	81,014	105,525	9,675	322,853	
Registered Electors		72,862	88,528	102,009	133,196		396,595	
Turnout		78.51%	78.43%	79.42%	79.23%		81.41%	

== 2009 Provincial Council Election ==
Results of the 6th Southern provincial council election held on 10 October 2009 for the district:

Party	Votes per Polling Division				Postal Votes	Total Votes	%	Seats
Party	Beli- atta	Mulkiri -gala	Tan- galla	Tissama -harama	Postal Votes	Total Votes	%	Seats
United People's Freedom Alliance (SLFP et al.)	32,851	38,420	51,969	64,074	5,647	192,961	66.95%	8
United National Party	10,335	14,833	13,053	23,233	937	62,391	21.65%	3
Janatha Vimukthi Peramuna	5,424	6,245	8,811	10,364	890	31,734	11.01%	1
United Socialist Party	45	62	53	61	0	221	0.08%	0
United Lanka People's Party	31	103	36	42	5	217	0.08%	0
National Development Front	27	46	53	48	0	174	0.06%	0
Independent 1	19	36	25	39	1	120	0.04%	0
Independent 6	16	25	33	29	2	105	0.04%	0
Independent 3	15	15	16	15	1	62	0.02%	0
United Lanka Great Council	10	18	6	20	1	55	0.02%	0
Janasetha Peramuna	7	13	17	14	1	52	0.02%	0
Independent 2	11	13	12	7	2	45	0.02%	0
Independent 5	4	14	10	6	0	34	0.01%	0
Sinhalaye Mahasammatha Bhoomiputra Pakshaya	5	8	4	2	4	23	0.01%	0
Independent 4	3	8	5	7	0	23	0.01%	0
Sri Lanka Progressive Front	1	4	5	4	0	14	0.00%	0
Valid Votes	48,804	59,863	74,108	97,965	7,491	288,231	100.00%	12
Rejected Votes	2,181	3,126	3,420	4,536	140	13,403		
Total Polled	50,985	62,989	77,528	102,501	7,631	301,634		
Registered Electors	74,470	93,685	109,409	143,622		421,186		
Turnout	68.46%	67.23%	70.86%	71.37%		71.62%		

The following candidates were elected: Wehella Kankanamge Indika (UPFA), 56,855 preference votes (pv); D.V.R. Priya Upul (UPFA), 50,944 pv; Kapila Gamini Samarasingha Dissanayaka (UPFA), 48,832 pv; Ajith Rajapakse (UPFA), 47,854 pv; Hewa Wellalage Gunasena (UPFA), 45,910 pv; Kodagoda Arachchige Somawansa (UPFA), 38,838 pv; Ananda Senarath Widanapathiranage (UPFA), 33,323 pv; Arjuna Nishantha de Silva Pussewelage (UPFA), 25,282 pv; Thennakoon Gamage Senarathne (UNP), 23,894 pv; Nimal Lalchandra Punchihewage (UNP), 17,614 pv; Ekanayake Somapala (UNP), 15,760 pv; and Kumudu Sujeewa Priyantha Lokuhennadige (JVP), 2,345 pv.

== 2010 Presidential Election ==
Results of the 6th presidential election held on 26 January 2010 for the district:

Candidate	Party	Votes per Polling Division				Postal Votes	Total Votes	%
Candidate	Party	Beli- atta	Mulkiri -gala	Tan- galla	Tissama -harama	Postal Votes	Total Votes	%
Mahinda Rajapaksa	UPFA	38,055	48,187	60,082	71,581	8,982	226,887	67.21%
Sarath Fonseka	NDF	17,965	22,537	23,729	37,426	3,679	105,336	31.20%
A.A. Suraweera	NDF	133	215	263	339	7	957	0.28%
M.C.M. Ismail	DUNF	131	238	238	334	6	947	0.28%
W.V. Mahiman Ranjith	Ind 1	93	181	215	220	7	716	0.21%
A.S.P Liyanage	SLLP	66	110	114	149	5	444	0.13%
C.J. Sugathsiri Gamage	UDF	87	112	64	145	1	409	0.12%
Ukkubanda Wijekoon	Ind 3	56	55	55	94	0	260	0.08%
Lal Perera	ONF	46	60	47	83	0	236	0.07%
Sarath Manamendra	NSH	34	72	48	60	3	217	0.06%
Siritunga Jayasuriya	USP	46	50	47	66	0	209	0.06%
Aithurus M. Illias	Ind 2	26	30	41	62	1	160	0.05%
M. K. Shivajilingam	Ind 5	25	32	32	47	0	136	0.04%
Vikramabahu Karunaratne	LF	24	31	35	37	3	130	0.04%
Battaramulla Seelarathana	JP	15	22	21	42	2	102	0.03%
M. Mohamed Musthaffa	Ind 4	8	25	26	28	0	87	0.03%
Sanath Pinnaduwa	NA	14	20	10	37	0	81	0.02%
Wije Dias	SEP	10	21	15	20	1	67	0.02%
Aruna de Soyza	RPP	8	15	11	24	1	59	0.02%
Senaratna de Silva	PNF	10	19	7	20	0	56	0.02%
Sarath Kongahage	UNAF	3	13	9	8	1	34	0.01%
M.B. Thaminimulla	ACAKO	7	5	10	12	0	34	0.01%
Valid Votes		56,862	72,050	85,119	110,834	12,699	337,564	100.00%
Rejected Votes		324	529	511	748	106	2,218	
Total Polled		57,186	72,579	85,630	111,582	12,805	339,782	
Registered Electors		74,470	93,685	109,409	143,622		421,186	
Turnout		76.79%	77.47%	78.27%	77.69%		80.67%	

== 2010 Parliamentary General Election ==
Results of the 14th parliamentary election held on 8 April 2010 for the district:

Party	Votes per Polling Division				Postal Votes	Total Votes	%	Seats
Party	Beli- atta	Mulkiri -gala	Tan- galla	Tissama -harama	Postal Votes	Total Votes	%	Seats
United People's Freedom Alliance (SLFP et al.)	31,330	35,851	46,289	52,058	9,280	174,808	62.87%	5
United National Front (UNP, SLMC, DPF, SLFP(P))	12,192	17,700	17,174	33,172	2,789	83,027	29.86%	2
Democratic National Alliance (JVP et al.)	3,338	3,364	5,449	5,751	1,284	19,186	6.90%	0
Our National Front	47	51	56	66	10	230	0.08%	0
United Socialist Party	26	43	29	60	2	160	0.06%	0
Independent 4	17	26	32	37	1	113	0.04%	0
United National Alternative Front	13	30	24	29	0	96	0.03%	0
Sri Lanka National Front	4	22	10	44	1	81	0.03%	0
Independent 1	10	8	9	28	3	58	0.02%	0
Independent 3	5	11	14	21	0	51	0.02%	0
United Democratic Front	12	11	8	9	1	41	0.01%	0
Patriotic National Front	5	7	10	10	0	32	0.01%	0
Independent 2	13	2	1	14	0	30	0.01%	0
Left Liberation Front	4	5	13	8	0	30	0.01%	0
National People's Party	6	4	8	6	3	27	0.01%	0
All Are Citizens, All Are Kings Organisation	7	5	5	7	2	26	0.01%	0
United Lanka Great Council	4	3	7	9	0	23	0.01%	0
Janasetha Peramuna	3	8	2	7	2	22	0.01%	0
Sri Lanka Labour Party	5	0	2	5	1	13	0.00%	0
Valid Votes	47,041	57,151	69,142	91,341	13,379	278,054	100.00%	7
Rejected Votes	1,917	2,661	2,547	3,776	339	11,240		
Total Polled	48,958	59,812	71,689	95,117	13,718	289,294		
Registered Electors	74,470	93,685	109,409	143,622		421,186		
Turnout	65.74%	63.84%	65.52%	66.23%		68.69%		

The following candidates were elected: Namal Rajapaksa (UPFA-SLFP), 147,566 preference votes (pv); Mahinda Amaraweera (UPFA-SLFP), 105,414 pv; Chamal Rajapaksa (UPFA-SLFP), 79,648 pv; Sajith Premadasa (UNF-UNP), 74,467 pv; Dilip Wedaarachchi (UNF-UNP), 47,160 pv; Nirupama Rajapaksa (UPFA-SLFP), 39,025 pv; and P. K. Indika (UPFA), 37,626 pv.
