= Nihal Galappaththi =

Sri Lankan politician

Hon. Nihal Galappaththi MP

Member of Parliament for Hambantota District
- Incumbent
- Assumed office 21 November 2024
- Majority: 125,983 preferential votes
- In office 1 September 2015 – 3 March 2020
- Majority: 12,162 preferential votes
- In office 25 August 1994 – 9 February 2010

Personal details
- Born: 22 December 1954 (age 71)
- Party: Janatha Vimukthi Peramuna
- Other political affiliations: National People's Power
- Spouse: Hema Galappaththi
- Children: Chathura Galappaththi

Arachchige Nihal Galappaththi (born 22 December 1954) is a Sri Lankan politician and member of the Parliament of Sri Lanka. He was the presidential candidate of the Sri Lanka Progressive Front in 1994.
