= Dileep Kumar =

Dileep Kumar may refer to:

- A. R. Rahman (born 1967), born A. S. Dileep Kumar, Indian composer
- Dilip Kumar (1922-2021), Indian film actor
- Dileep Kumar (politician), Indian politician
