= Ananda Kularatne =

Sri Lankan politician

Hon. Ananda Kularatne

Minister of Southern Region Development
- In office 2001–2004

Minister for Highways
- In office 1989–1993

Member of Parliament for Hambantota
- In office 1983–2004

Personal details
- Born: Kadukannage Ananda Kularatne
- Party: United National Party
- Education: Mahinda College, Aquinas College, Borella
- Occupation: Politics

Kadukannage Ananda Kularatne is a Sri Lankan politician. He was the Minister of State for Highways from 1989 to 1993 and the Minister of Southern Region Development from 2001 until 2004.

Ananda Kularatne was first elected to parliament following a 1983 by-election in the Hambantota Electoral District however that decision was overturned following an election petition by Nirupama Rajapaksa. That necessitated another by-election which was held in September 1985 where Kularatne was again successful, defeating Chamal Rajapaksa by the slim margin of 1,300 votes.

At the 1989 parliamentary election Kularatne was re-elected. In February 1989 he was appointed the Minister of State for Highways in the Premadasa cabinet. He was re-elected in 1994, 2000 and 2001, at which time he was appointed Minister of Southern Region Development in December 2001, as part of the Kumaratunga cabinet. Kularatne failed to gain a seat at the 2004 parliamentary elections.
