= Prabha Senarath =

Sri Lankan politician

Prabha Ruwan Senarath is a Sri Lankan politician. He was elected to the Sri Lankan Parliament from Hambantota Electoral District as a member of the National People's Power. He is the Deputy Minister of Provincial Councils and Local Government.
