= Vineeta Bal =

Indian medical researcher

- Education: Pune University, Haffkine Institute
- Scientific career
- Workplaces: National Institute of Immunology

Vineeta Bal is a scientist in the National Institute of Immunology and she was a member of the Prime Minister's task force for Women in Science under the Ministry of Science and Technology.

== Education and career ==
She did her MBBS from Pune University and MD in Microbiology from Haffkine Institute in the University of Bombay and later did post-doctoral training in Royal Post-graduate Medical School in London.

== Research ==
Bal’s research has centered on understanding the molecular and cellular mechanisms that regulate T lymphocyte differentiation, survival, and function in health and disease. Her work has included investigations of Th1/Th2 pathways, memory versus effector T cell responses, macrophage survival, and immune responses to infectious agents.

She has co-authored numerous peer-reviewed articles on immune cell regulation, including studies on CD8 T cell responses in virus-induced morbidity, B cell differentiation pathways, and the roles of immune signaling pathways in infection and inflammation.
