= Dilip Roy =

Dilip Roy may refer to:

- Dilip Dholakia (1921–2011), Indian music composer and singer, sometimes credited as Dilip Roy
- Dilip Roy (actor) (1931–2010), Indian Bengali film actor and director
- Dilipkumar Roy (1897–1980), Indian Bengali musician, musicologist and writer
