= Dileep G. Bal =

Indian-American physician

Dileep G. Bal M.D., M.S., M.P.H.

District Health Officer for the Island of Kauai
- In office 2005–2016

Director of the California Cancer Control Branch and Tobacco Control Section
- In office 1981–2005

President of the American Cancer Society
- In office 2001

Director of the Pima County Health Department
- In office 1977–1981

Deputy director of the Pima County Health Department
- In office 1976

Personal details
- Born: c. 1945 Madras City, India
- Education: All India Institute of Medical Sciences, Delhi; Columbia University; Harvard University
- Known for: California Tobacco Control Program

Dileep G. Bal (born c. 1945) is an Indian-American physician, epidemiologist, and public health administrator. He is also a faculty member of the John A. Burns School of Medicine of the University of Hawaii at Manoa, and previously of the University of California School of Medicine at Davis and the University of Arizona College of Medicine. As a public servant, health advocate and academic researcher, his areas of focus include tobacco control, cancer and obesity prevention, and remedying socio-economic disparities in health care.

Bal's career as a public servant spans 46 years but he is best known for initiating and overseeing a two-decades-long anti-tobacco campaign beginning in 1989 while serving as director of California's Cancer Control Branch and Tobacco Control Section, subdivisions of the Department of Health Services. Previously, he held the position of Pima County Health Director in Tucson, Arizona. He has also served as a president of the American Cancer Society's (ACS) local unit, a state division, and later served a term as president of the nationwide ACS organization in 2001.

== Early life and education ==
Bal was born in Madras City, and later moved to New Delhi, India. He earned his medical degree from the All India Institute of Medical Sciences in New Delhi. He also graduated with a Master of Science degree from Columbia University in 1970 and a Master of Public Health degree from Harvard University in 1971. Bal completed his clinical residency at the University of Arizona College of Medicine.

== Career ==
=== Public health ===
In 1973, Bal was appointed as Assistant Professor of Family & Community Medicine at the University of Arizona College of Medicine. While continuing to teach at the University of Arizona, as a physician and epidemiologist, he held various positions in the Pima County Health Department. In 1974, he also served part-time as interim director for communicable diseases after the retirement of the previous director, Clarence Robbins. Bal went on to serve as deputy director, and was later director of the health department from 1977 to 1981.

In 1981, Bal was appointed as a public health medical officer and later was promoted to become the head of the Cancer Control Branch of California's Department of Health Services. He spent 25 years in the department, gaining renown for his design of and contributions to California's anti-tobacco campaign that was replicated in many states in the U.S. and several countries around the world. The campaign was funded by the passage of Proposition 99 in 1988, which imposed a 25-cent tax on every pack of cigarettes sold in California. The funds generated were used to aggressively control tobacco use in the state, by addressing the predatory advertising and marketing practices of the tobacco industry. Another creation of this program was a statewide effort to address second-hand smoke including legislation banning smoking in California restaurants and bars. Bal was a principal architect behind the California initiative of using public funds to counter the tobacco industry's deceptive public relations and advertising campaign by designing and implementing a counter-advertising effort.

In 2001, he served as the national president of the American Cancer Society (ACS). Bal is an active member of ACS, and throughout his career has held various leadership positions in the organization's local and state branches.

In 2005, Bal joined the Hawaii State Department of Health as special advisor to the director of the department and district health officer for the Island of Kauai. While in Hawaii, he was responsible for bringing in federal funds to design and operate several public health efforts, focused especially on obesity control, physical activity and socio-economic disparity. Among them, the best known is Tropic Care Kauai, a biennial two-week United States Department of Defense-funded training program that brought about 400 healthcare professionals each year to Kauai to provide medical, dental, optometric and other health care to Kauai's population in 2012, 2014, 2016, and 2017. The program has benefited many Kauai residents, especially in the provision of much-needed dental care (which is often not covered by health insurance), and provided about 3,500 pairs of free prescription eyeglasses in just the first year. Bal was the one who first researched, applied for and brought these military training programs to Kauai, and then exported them to the other Hawaiian islands. In July 2016, Bal retired as Kauai District Health Officer after more than 11 years at the position, but the programs like Tropic Care continue.

=== Academic ===
Throughout his over four-decade-long career in public health, Bal has had clinical appointments at several medical schools. In the 1970s, he was a professor at the University of Arizona College of Medicine. From 1981 to 2005, he was a professor at the University of California School of Medicine at Davis. Since 2005, Bal has been a professor at the John A. Burns School of Medicine and the Cancer Center of the University of Hawaii. He was appointed to the University of Hawaii Board of Regents in 2014. Bal has been most active in all these universities' teaching and research programs and has been principal investigator on several National Cancer Institute and Centers for Disease Control funded cancer prevention and control projects. He has been on the editorial boards or been an active reviewer for several peer-reviewed medical journals, as well as for the Institute of Medicine of the National Academy of Sciences. Bal has been a frequent national and international speaker. He gave the commencement address at Brown University Medical School in 2005.

== Personal life ==
Bal is married to Muktha Bal and they live in Kauai. They have two adult children, Sarah and Vijay.

== Awards and honors ==
At the American Thoracic Society (ATS) International Conference in 2005, Bal was awarded the ATS's Public Service Award which "recognizes contributions to public health related to improvement of indoor and outdoor air quality, eradication of tobacco usage, [and] prevention of lung disease."

In 2006, Bal was awarded the Christopher N.H. Jenkins Cancer Control Award for "significant accomplishments in community-oriented cancer prevention and control efforts targeting Asian Americans and Pacific Islanders"

In 2007, he was given the American Medical Association Foundation Award for Education which is awarded to "physicians who have led, developed or implemented professional and public health education activities."

Bal was awarded the 2009 Luther Terry Award by the American Cancer Society for leading California's Tobacco Control Section in making "outstanding progress in tobacco control... He has earned a reputation for making courageous decisions and taking calculated risks to advance tobacco control to unprecedented levels of effectiveness."

On February 23, 2016, he was presented with the American Medical Association's Dr. Nathan Davis Award for outstanding public service at the local level. In bestowing the honor, the American Medical Association's chairman Stephen R. Permut stated:

Bal has been a dedicated community servant in California and Hawaii for nearly half a century. He is known by many as a key player in the development of innovative and effective initiatives, from California's ban on cigarette vending machines to low-income medical care and obesity prevention efforts in Kauai. In addition to serving as a past president for the American Cancer Society, Dr. Bal has published and reviewed for medical journals in areas of cancer prevention and control.

In 2016, Bal was awarded the Harvard School of Public Health Alumni Award of Merit for "[pioneering] the strategy of countering the tobacco industry's deceptive marketing with an aggressive campaign of advertising. The California model has been replicated worldwide, and Bal's work with the World Health Organization facilitated the adoption of strong tobacco-control policies in developing countries."
