= Emre Bal =

Dutch-born Turkish football player

Personal information
- Date of birth: 5 January 1997 (age 29)
- Place of birth: Utrecht, Netherlands
- Position: Forward

Team information
- Current team: DHSC
- Number: 11

Youth career
- –2014: FC Utrecht
- 2014–2016: Almere City

Senior career*
Years	Team	Apps	(Gls)
2016–2017	Almere City	1	(0)
2016–2017	Jong Almere City	18	(5)
2018–	DHSC	?	(?)

International career
2012	Turkey U16	4	(0)
- * Club domestic league appearances and goals as of 16:15, 1 October 2021 (UTC)

Emre Bal (born 5 January 1997) is a Turkish footballer who plays as a forward for Hoofdklasse club DHSC. He also holds Dutch citizenship.

== Club career ==
He made his professional debut in the Eerste Divisie for Almere City FC on 22 August 2016 in a game against FC Emmen.

Since 2018, Bal has played for lower-league Hoofdklasse club DHSC.
