= Dilip T. =

India national cricket team's fielding coach

T. Dilip
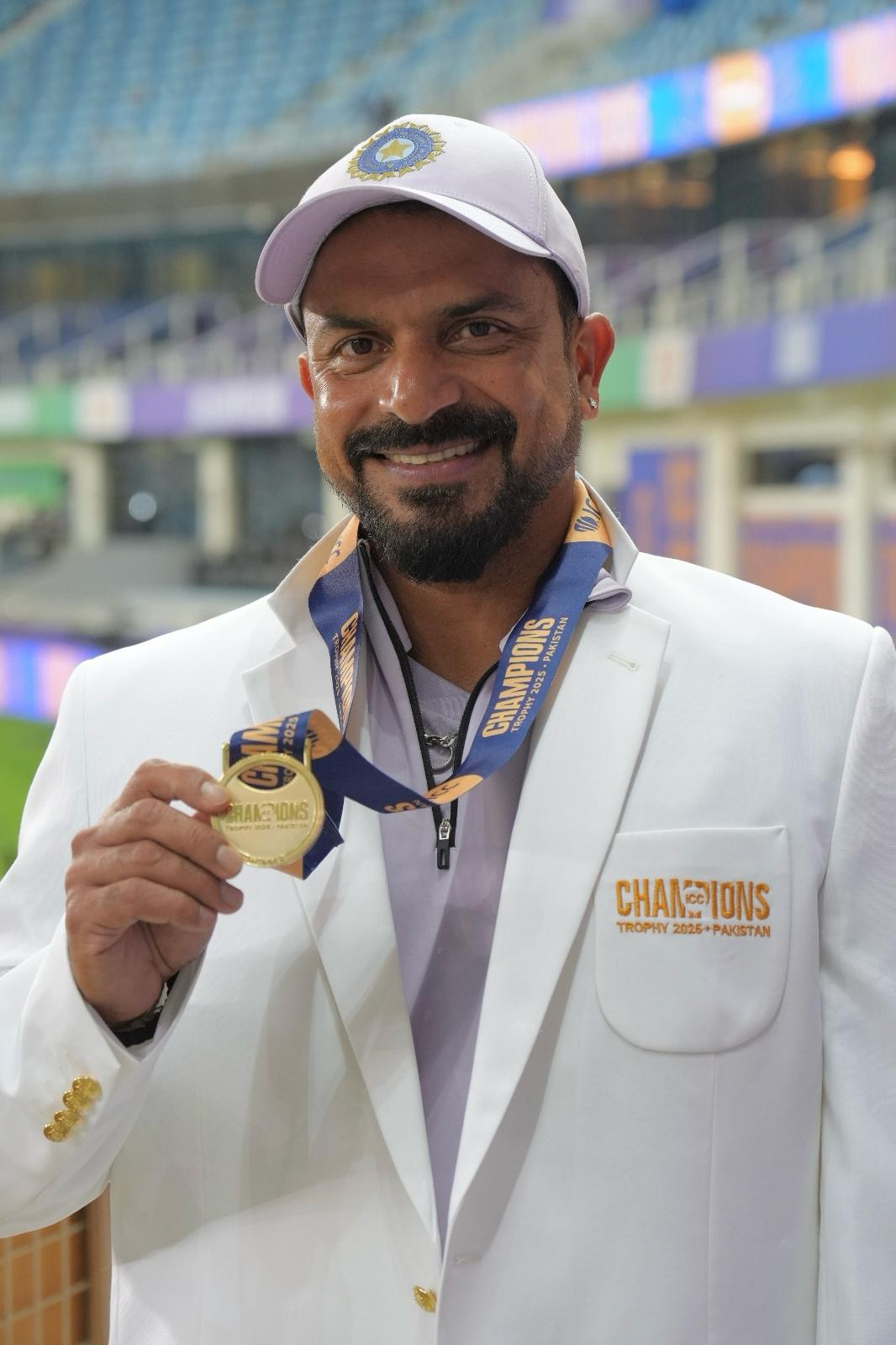
- T. Dilip in 2025
- Born: Tettukandadai Dilip; September 1, 1980 (age 46); Hyderabad, Telangana, India
- Citizenship: Indian
- Education: Auroras Degree College
- Occupation: Cricket fielding coach
- Website: www.tdilip.com

Tettukandadai Dilip is the BCCI's current fielding coach for Indian Premier League team Mumbai Indians.
