= Dilip D'Souza =

Indian journalist and writer

- D'Souza with wife Vibha Kamat from 2003 BITS alumni reunion dinner
- Born: 1960 (age 65–66); India
- Education: BITS Pilani, Brown University
- Occupations: Writer and journalist

Dilip D'Souza (born 1960) is a Mumbai-based writer and journalist. He writes about social and political causes. His columns have appeared in The Sunday Observer, Rediff.com, Outlook, Mid-Day, Hindustan Times, indiatogether.org, The Caravan and other publications.

== Personal life ==
Dilip D'Souza was born to Neela D'Souza, a journalist, and J.B. D'Souza, who served as Maharashtra's Chief Secretary and Municipal Commissioner of Bombay. D'Souza did a BE in Electrical and Electronics Engineering from BITS Pilani (1976–81) and an MS in Computer Science from Brown University (1984).

He married French language teacher Vibha Kamat in 1993, and they have two children, son Sahir, born 1999, and daughter Surabhi, born 2004. He studied and worked as a software engineer in United States from 1981 to 1992 when he returned to India to write full-time. He speaks Tamil, Hindi, Marathi and English.

As an alumnus of Birla Institute of Technology and Science, he is dedicated to alumni activities and has come over many times to his alma mater. He was there in February 2010 to promote his new book Roadrunner. He is currently on the editorial board of the BITS Alumni magazine Sandpaper. D'Souza also maintains a blog "Death Ends Fun".

== Awards ==
D'Souza has won several awards for his writing, including The Daily Beast award for South Asian commentary, the Statesman Rural Reporting Award, the Times of India/Red Cross prize, the Outlook/Picador nonfiction prize (for which he was also, earlier, runner up), the Sanctuary Magazine prize and more.

- Outlook/Picador prize in 2004 for his essay "Ride Across The River". It was about an Army officer killed in action in Kashmir, examining patriotism through his example.

== Affiliations ==
- D'Souza is a member of the Managing Committee of Citizens for Peace (CfP) in Mumbai.
- D'Souza has worked with the People's Union for Civil Liberties (PUCL), the Narmada Bachao Andolan and Ekta.
- D'Souza was a member of the Pakistan-India People's Forum for Peace and Democracy (PIPFPD). The PIPFPD pursues "Track II diplomacy", meaning increased contact between ordinary people in both countries, towards peace between India and Pakistan.
- He was also a member of the India Progressive Action Group (IPAG) in Austin, Texas, that funded and worked closely with various rural development projects in India.
- He was on the editorial board of the Consumer Guidance Society of India (CGSI) and the Foundation for Humanization.
- D'Souza was an invited speaker/panelist to the Austin conference of the Association for India's Development (AID) and witnessed first-hand their relief and rehabilitation work in Tamil Nadu after the tsunami in December 2004.

== Works ==
- Branded by Law: Looking at India's Denotified Tribes, by Dilip D'Souza. Published by Penguin Books, 2001. ISBN 0-14-100749-4.
- The Narmada Dammed: An Inquiry into the Politics of Development, by Dilip D'Souza. Published by Penguin Books, 2002. ISBN 0-14-302865-0
- Roadrunner: An Indian Quest in America, by Dilip D'Souza. Published by HarperCollins India, 2009. ISBN 81-7223-906-8
- The Curious Case of Binayak Sen, by Dilip D'Souza. Published by HarperCollins India, 2012. ISBN 93-5029-486-9
- Final Test: Exit Sachin Tendulkar, by Dilip D'Souza. Published by Random House, 2014. ISBN 81-8400-636-5
- Dhyan Singh 'Chand': Hockey's Magician, by Dilip D'Souza. Published by Pratham Books, 2016.
