= Counteradvertising =

Advertising against a promotional message

Counteradvertising is “Advertising that takes a position contrary to an advertising message that preceded it. Such advertising may be used to take an opposing position on a controversial topic, or to counter an impression that might be made by another party's advertising.” Counteradvertising is often seen informally on controversial topics like smoking.

== History ==
Counteradvertising was first formally introduced in the United States by the Federal Trade Commission (FTC) in 1972, although the concept was not new. The FTC tried to persuade the Federal Communications Commission (FCC) on the need for counteradvertising air time to balance the views expressed by commercial sponsors on television broadcasts. The FCC did not openly accept this suggestion, however, several counteradvertising spots were produced in the 1970s.

Burt Lancaster acted as the talent for counteradvertising spots including Bayer aspirin and Chevrolet vehicles. These spots were counter-advocacy for these brands.

Those who supported this form of advertising claimed that it was necessary to combat advertisers and gain freedom of speech. Those who would be fiscally impacted by counteradvertising, mostly broadcasters and advertisers, opposed this form of advertising claiming that it would destroy the television industry. The momentum of counteradvertising was decreasingly significantly by 1976, because broadcasters and advertisers combated the issue. Some stations did still support counteradvertising, and the issue was often found in the courts.
