= Athula Hewage =

Sri Lankan politician

Athula Hewage is a Sri Lankan politician. He was elected to the Sri Lankan Parliament from Hambantota Electoral District as a member of the National People's Power.
