= Dilip Wedaarachchi =

Sri Lankan politician (born 1957)

Hon. Dilip Wedaarachchi MP
- දිලිප් වෙදආරච්චි திலீப் வெடாராச்சி
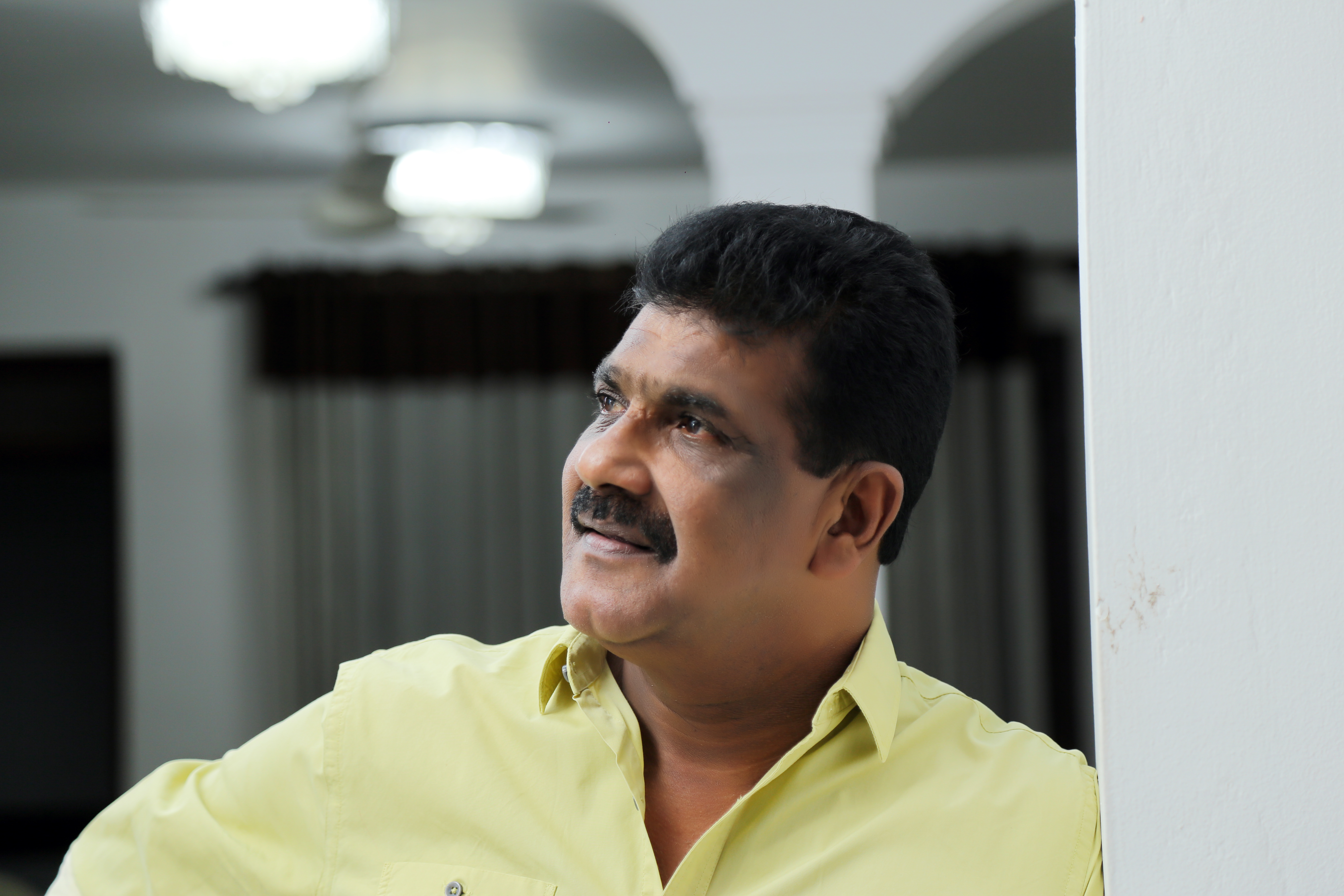

Member of Parliament for Hambantota District
- Incumbent
- Assumed office 2000

Personal details
- Born: 5 February 1957 (age 69)
- Party: Samagi Jana Balawegaya (after 2020)
- Other political affiliations: United National Party (before 2020)

Dilip Wedaarachchi (born 5 February 1957) is a Sri Lankan politician and member of the Parliament of Sri Lanka.

In 2020, he famously ate a raw fish at a press conference to debunk rumours claiming COVID-19 could be transmitted by consumption of seafood.
