= Navjeet Bal =

American lawyer

Navjeet K. Bal is an American lawyer at Nixon Peabody’s Public Finance group, and was the second woman to be appointed Commissioner of Revenue of Massachusetts state where she served from 2008 to 2013. She is the first minority and first south Asian to hold the position of commissioner in the state. She is a graduate from Williams College and Northeastern University School of Law, and served for seventeen years as public finance attorney prior to being appointed Commissioner.

Before her time at the Department of Revenue, Bal founded Mintz Levin's Domestic Violence Project in 1990, and is a board member and former chairperson of the Legal Advocacy and Resource Center in Boston. She has also served on the executive committee for the Massachusetts state planning committee for the delivery of legal services.
