= Dileep Kumar (politician) =

K. Dileep Kumar is an Indian politician and Member of Andhra Pradesh Legislative Council. He is a member of Telangana Jana Parishad, an outfit fighting for separate Telangana state.

Kapilavai Dileep Kumar joined Congress party in 2023.

== Family and date of birth ==
Kapilavai Dileep Kumar, S/o. Late K. Seetharama Sastry, R/o Warangal dist. was born on 20.04.1954 in Pocharam village of Khammam district (Currently Mahabubabad District) of Telangana. His spouse's name is K. Indira. He has a daughter and son.

== Education ==
1. B.Sc., M.A., L.L.B.ias ipa

== Political career ==
Present Senior Leader, Telangana Jana Samithi (Prof. Kodandaram) Member ESIC Board, GOI & former vice president, BJP Telangana.

- Former Member of AP State Forest Service from Dec. 1978 to Dec. 2003 (28 years).
- Served as a Private Secretary in various Ministries in United Andhra Pradesh State.

Private Secretary to Health Minister 1994 to 1995 (with Late Alimineti Madhava Reddy).

Private Secretary to Home Minister 1995 to 1998. (-Do-)

Private Secretary to Panchayat Raj and Rural development 1998 to 2003. (-do-)

Private Secretary to Mines Minister 1999 to 2003 (with Smt. Alimineti Uma Madhava Reddy).

- Served as private secretary to Union Minister (without portfolio) Government of India from 30.04.2004 to 26.11.2004 (with Sri Chandrashekar Rao – present Chief Minister of Telangana state).
- Served as Private Secretary to Labor Minister, Government of India from 26.11.2004 to 31.07.2007 (with Sri Chandrashekar Rao – present Chief Minister of Telangana state).
- Member of Peace Delegation to Libya in 2009 with other M.P.'s from Indian Parliament.
- Member of Peace Delegation to Sudan during 2011 with other M.P.'s from Indian Parliament.
- Member of Legislative Council of united Andhra Pradesh 2007–2009.
- Member of Legislative Council of united Andhra Pradesh 2009–2014.
- Member of new Telangana Legislature Council from June 2014 till March 2015.
- Toured several countries and studied environmental, skill and employment related issues in USA, UK, Australia, New Zealand, France, Italy, Switzerland, Tanzania, Libya, Sudan, Kenya, Canada, Singapore, Malaysia, Hong Kong, China, Thailand, Nepal, Russia, UAE etc.
- Expert in providing Skill Training and was invited to give various guest lectures.
- Organized

Eight Job/Skill/Loan Mela's in Twin Cities of Hyderabad during 2016–17.

Two Jobmela's in Tirupathi & Guntur during 2017–18

Two Job/Skill/Loan Mela's in Karnataka during 2017-18
