= Electoral districts of Sri Lanka =

22 multi-member electoral districts

- Electoral districts and polling divisions of Sri Lanka
- Category: Electoral districts
- Location: Sri Lanka
- Created by: 1978 Constitution
- Created: 7 September 1978
- Number: 22 (as of 2024)
- Government: Parliament of Sri Lanka

The 1978 Constitution of Sri Lanka provides for the election of members of Parliament from 22 multi-member electoral districts through the proportional representation electoral system.

All but two of the electoral districts are conterminous with their namesake administrative district. The two exceptions are Jaffna (which covers the administrative districts of Jaffna and Kilinochchi) and Vanni (which covers the administrative districts of Mannar, Mullaitivu and Vavuniya). The first general election which used these electoral districts was in 1989.

== Constitutional provision ==
According to the constitution the Parliament should consist of 225 seats (members):

- 36 seats were allocated to the nine provinces, four each (section 96(4)). A delimitation commission would apportion the four seats between the electoral districts in each province.
- 160 seats were allocated to the electoral districts (section 98). An election commission would apportion the seats annually based on the number of registered electors.
- 29 seats were reserved for the national list (section 99A).

=== Delimitation commission ===
The constitution required the establishment of a delimitation commission for the delimitation of the electoral districts and apportion the 36 provincial seats. The constitution limited the number of electoral districts to between 20 and 25.

The Delimitation Commission was appointed on 29 November 1978. Its decision was published on 15 January 1981. The country was divided into 22 electoral districts. 21 of the 22 electoral districts were conterminous with their namesake administrative district. The other electoral district - Vanni - consisted of the administrative districts of Mannar, Mullaitivu and Vavuniya. The 36 provincial seats were apportioned as follows:

- Central Province - Kandy 1; Matale 1; Nuwara Eliya 2.
- Eastern Province - Ampara 2; Batticaloa 1; Trincomalee 1.
- Northern Province - Jaffna 1, Vanni 3.
- North Central Province - Anuradhapura 2, Polonnaruwa 2.
- North Western Province - Kurunegala 2, Puttalam 2.
- Sabaragamuwa Province - Kegalla 2; Ratnapura 2.
- Southern Province - Galle 1, Matara 1; Hambantota 2.
- Uva Province - Badulla 2; Monaragala 2.
- Western Province - Colombo 2; Gampaha 1; Kalutara 1.

Kilinochchi Administrative District was created from southern Jaffna Administrative District in February 1984. Consequently, Jaffna Electoral District now consists of two administrative districts (Jaffna and Kilinochchi).

== Jaffna seats controversy ==
The annual updating of the electoral register in Sri Lanka is done by house-to-house enumeration. The civil war prevented house-to-house enumeration from taking place in most of the Northern Province from the mid-1980s onwards. For these areas the Department of Elections instead took the previous year's register and added anyone who had since turned 18.

The civil war resulted in significant population displacement and emigration from the Northern Province. Two of the biggest displacements occurred in 1995 and 2008. Virtually the entire population of the Jaffna Peninsula fled to the Vanni in 1995 to escape the military onslaught by the Sri Lankan military as they tried to recapture the peninsula from the rebel Liberation Tigers of Tamil Eelam. Most of the population of the Vanni were displaced in 2008 as they fled the military onslaught by the Sri Lankan military to recapture the Vanni from the LTTE. Hundreds of thousands fled abroad from the Northern Province during the civil war. Tens of thousands also fled to other parts of Sri Lanka outside the conflict zone, particularly to the capital Colombo.

As a consequence of all this the electoral register for the Northern Province was overstated for many years. The civil war ended in May 2009 and in 2010 the first house-to-house enumeration in around 25 years took place in most of the Northern Province. The result of the enumeration was that about 300,000 electors were deleted from the electoral register for the Northern Province. Consequently, the total number of parliamentary seats allocated to Jaffna Electoral District, one of the two electoral districts that make up the Northern Province, was reduced from 10 (2009) to 6 (2010). The number of parliamentary seats allocated to Vanni Electoral District, the other electoral district in the Northern Province, remained unchanged at 6.

Jaffna Electoral District's problems were exacerbated by the decision of the 1978 Delimitation Commission to allocate it only one of the four provincial seats - the other three provincial seats were allocated to Vanni Electoral District even though at that time Jaffna had more than four times the number of electors than Vanni. This decision meant that 30 years later Jaffna had the same number of total seats (six) as Vanni despite having more than twice the number of electors. Jaffna now also had one fewer seat than Ampara Electoral District, Hambantota Electoral District and Nuwara Eliya Electoral District despite having more electors. It had two fewer seats than Puttalam Electoral District despite having only 25,000 fewer electors.

The decision by the Department of Elections to reduce Jaffna's seats drew much criticism, particularly by opposition parties. They pointed out that although there are only a small number of people still in IDP camps, tens of thousands had not returned to their homes and were living with relatives due to the existence of High Security Zones and ongoing de-mining. It was not known if all of these people were registered to vote. For most people in the Northern Province rebuilding their lives after the devastating civil war had been far more important than registering to vote. Many also did not have any form of identification to register as they had lost their official documents during the frequent displacements. As result the electoral register for Jaffna Electoral District was likely to be understated. It was also not known if those who had fled to other parts of Sri Lanka like Colombo were registered to vote in those areas. The government and the Department of Elections rejected the criticism, saying that they were only doing what the constitution required them to do.

== Number of parliamentary seats per electoral district ==
=== Current allocation of seats: 2024 ===
Registered electors and parliamentary seat allocation changes: 2020 to 2024
Province	Electoral district	Registered electors		Number of allocated seats		
Province	Electoral district	2020	2024	2020	2024	Change (±)
Western	Colombo	1,709,209	1,765,351	19	18	▼1
Western	Gampaha	1,785,964	1,881,129	18	19	▲1
Western	Kalutara	972,319	1,024,244	10	11	▲1
Central	Kandy	1,129,100	1,191,399	12	12	Steady
Central	Matale	407,569	429,991	5	5	Steady
Central	Nuwara Eliya	577,717	605,292	8	8	Steady
Southern	Galle	867,709	903,163	9	9	Steady
Southern	Matara	659,587	686,175	7	7	Steady
Southern	Hambantota	493,192	520,940	7	7	Steady
Northern	Jaffna	571,848	593,187	7	6	▼1
Northern	Vanni	287,024	306,081	6	6	Steady
Eastern	Batticaloa	409,808	449,686	5	5	Steady
Eastern	Ampara	513,979	555,432	7	7	Steady
Eastern	Trincomalee	288,868	315,925	4	4	Steady
North Western	Kurunegala	1,348,787	1,417,226	15	15	Steady
North Western	Puttalam	614,374	663,673	8	8	Steady
North Central	Anuradhapura	693,634	741,862	9	9	Steady
North Central	Polonnaruwa	331,109	351,302	5	5	Steady
Uva	Badulla	668,166	705,772	9	9	Steady
Uva	Monaragala	372,155	399,166	6	6	Steady
Sabaragamuwa	Ratnapura	877,582	923,736	11	11	Steady
Sabaragamuwa	Kegalle	684,189	709,622	9	9	Steady
National List	—N/a	—N/a	—N/a	29	29	Steady
Total	—N/a	16,263,885	17,140,354	225	225	Steady

=== Historical allocation of seats ===
2014

Allocation of seats: 2014
Electoral District	Province	Area km^{2}	Polling Divisions	Population (2014)	Registered Electors (2014)	Sect. 98 Seats - (2014)	Sect. 96(4) Seats - (1979)	Total Seats - (2014)
Ampara (Digamadulla)	Eastern	4,415	4	645,803	465,757	5	2	7
Anuradhapura	North Central	7,179	7	855,373	636,733	7	2	9
Badulla	Uva	2,861	9	811,138	620,486	6	2	8
Batticaloa	Eastern	2,854	3	525,166	365,167	4	1	5
Colombo	Western	699	15	2,322,942	1,586,598	17	2	19
Galle	Southern	1,652	10	1,058,902	819,866	9	1	10
Gampaha	Western	1,387	13	2,298,190	1,637,537	17	1	18
Hambantota	Southern	2,609	4	595,802	462,911	5	2	7
Jaffna	Northern	2,304	11	695,867	529,239	5	2	7
Kalutara	Western	1,598	8	1,214,720	897,349	9	1	10
Kandy	Central	1,940	13	1,367,900	1,049,160	11	1	12
Kegalle	Sabaragamuwa	1,693	9	837,100	649,878	7	2	9
Kurunegala	North Western	4,816	14	1,611,230	1,266,443	13	2	15
Matale	Central	1,993	4	482,294	379,675	4	1	5
Matara	Southern	1,283	7	810,629	623,818	7	1	8
Monaragala	Uva	5,639	3	448,080	339,797	3	2	5
Nuwara Eliya	Central	1,741	4	706,156	534,150	6	2	8
Polonnaruwa	North Central	3,293	3	403,827	307,125	3	2	5
Puttalam	North Western	3,072	5	760,651	553,009	6	2	8
Ratnapura	Sabaragamuwa	3,275	8	1,082,051	769,814	9	2	11
Trincomalee	Eastern	2,727	3	376,337	256,862	3	1	4
Vanni	Northern	6,580	3	364,021	253,058	4	2	6
National List								29
Total		65,610	160	20,274,179	14,268,063	160	36	225

1979–2011

Allocation of seats: 1979–2011
Year		Electoral District																						Total
Year		AMP	ANU	BAD	BAT	COL	GAL	GAM	HAM	JAF	KAL	KAN	KEG	KUR	MON	MTL	MTR	NUW	POL	PUT	RAT	TRI	VAN	Total
2011	Electors	441,287	606,508	591,292	347,099	1,512,670	790,207	1,538,368	442,060	482,342	853,609	1,002,493	631,981	1,216,286	319,557	359,796	595,867	488,133	294,365	517,557	769,814	245,363	221,409	14,268,063
2011	Sect. 98 Seats	5	7	7	4	17	9	17	5	5	9	11	7	14	4	4	7	5	3	6	9	3	2	160
2011	Sect. 96(4) Seats	2	2	2	1	2	1	1	2	1	1	1	2	2	2	1	1	2	2	2	2	1	3	36
2011	Total Seats	7	9	9	5	19	10	18	7	6	10	12	9	16	6	5	8	7	5	8	11	4	5	196
2010	Electors	436,148	598,274	590,341	344,750	1,542,491	784,530	1,529,563	438,202	484,791	845,626	997,807	629,669	1,209,323	315,452	354,112	593,778	482,550	290,494	509,714	761,336	246,890	236,449	14,222,290
2010	Sect. 98 Seats	5	7	7	4	17	9	17	5	5	9	11	7	14	3	4	7	5	3	6	9	3	3	160
2010	Sect. 96(4) Seats	2	2	2	1	2	1	1	2	1	1	1	2	2	2	1	1	2	2	2	2	1	3	36
2010	Total Seats	7	9	9	5	19	10	18	7	6	10	12	9	16	5	5	8	7	5	8	11	4	6	196
2009	Electors	426,109	585,934	581,971	335,882	1,503,310	770,570	1,497,814	428,636	816,005	826,921	976,789	620,090	1,193,228	308,230	345,104	584,800	467,103	284,279	500,751	746,029	245,155	270,707	14,315,417
2009	Sect. 98 Seats	5	7	6	4	17	9	17	5	9	9	11	7	13	3	4	6	5	3	6	8	3	3	160
2009	Sect. 96(4) Seats	2	2	2	1	2	1	1	2	1	1	1	2	2	2	1	1	2	2	2	2	1	3	36
2009	Total Seats	7	9	8	5	19	10	18	7	10	10	12	9	15	5	5	7	7	5	8	10	4	6	196
2008	Electors	420,835	579,261	574,814	333,644	1,521,854	761,815	1,474,464	421,186	721,359	813,233	970,456	613,938	1,183,649	300,642	342,684	578,858	457,137	280,337	495,575	734,651	241,133	266,975	14,088,500
2008	Sect. 98 Seats	5	7	6	4	17	9	17	5	8	9	11	7	13	3	4	7	5	3	6	8	3	3	160
2008	Sect. 96(4) Seats	2	2	2	1	2	1	1	2	1	1	1	2	2	2	1	1	2	2	2	2	1	3	36
2008	Total Seats	7	9	8	5	19	10	18	7	9	10	12	9	15	5	5	8	7	5	8	10	4	6	196
2007	Electors	414,523	569,417	561,021	331,269	1,560,593	753,172	1,458,295	414,112	716,435	801,326	955,108	605,626	1,171,881	294,761	338,946	576,208	452,395	277,056	489,852	713,205	240,632	262,539	13,958,372
2007	Sect. 98 Seats	5	6	6	4	18	9	17	5	8	9	11	7	13	3	4	7	5	3	6	8	3	3	160
2007	Sect. 96(4) Seats	2	2	2	1	2	1	1	2	1	1	1	2	2	2	1	1	2	2	2	2	1	3	36
2007	Total Seats	7	8	8	5	20	10	18	7	9	10	12	9	15	5	5	8	7	5	8	10	4	6	196
2006	Electors	409,308	558,413	554,026	330,950	1,543,282	747,190	1,430,679	408,240	710,174	788,606	940,923	599,435	1,160,274	288,650	334,680	573,833	450,390	272,634	484,076	701,379	242,463	259,113	13,788,718
2006	Sect. 98 Seats	5	6	6	4	18	9	17	5	8	9	11	7	13	3	4	7	5	3	6	8	3	3	160
2006	Sect. 96(4) Seats	2	2	2	1	2	1	1	2	1	1	1	2	2	2	1	1	2	2	2	2	1	3	36
2006	Total Seats	7	8	8	5	20	10	18	7	9	10	12	9	15	5	5	8	7	5	8	10	4	6	196
2005	Electors	399,395	547,303	541,331	324,387	1,502,967	736,813	1,397,358	401,540	707,309	772,999	923,017	589,676	1,140,125	282,724	328,938	568,125	449,539	266,652	476,781	684,529	242,112	254,751	13,538,371
2005	Sect. 98 Seats	5	6	6	4	18	9	17	5	8	9	11	7	13	3	4	7	5	3	6	8	3	3	160
2005	Sect. 96(4) Seats	2	2	2	1	2	1	1	2	1	1	1	2	2	2	1	1	2	2	2	2	1	3	36
2005	Total Seats	7	8	8	5	20	10	18	7	9	10	12	9	15	5	5	8	7	5	8	10	4	6	196
2004	Electors	396,453	536,808	533,163	318,728	1,468,537	732,289	1,364,180	396,595	701,938	764,305	907,038	583,282	1,124,076	276,109	321,876	562,987	447,225	263,609	470,604	668,217	238,755	250,386	13,327,160
2004	Sect. 98 Seats	5	6	6	4	18	9	16	5	8	9	11	7	14	3	4	7	5	3	6	8	3	3	160
2004	Sect. 96(4) Seats	2	2	2	1	2	1	1	2	1	1	1	2	2	2	1	1	2	2	2	2	1	3	36
2004	Total Seats	7	8	8	5	20	10	17	7	9	10	12	9	16	5	5	8	7	5	8	10	4	6	196
2003	Electors	387,512	523,485	518,958	310,172	1,450,845	723,080	1,339,715	389,998	651,361	753,327	891,356	574,917	1,104,895	268,517	316,847	555,929	439,861	259,039	460,084	655,248	229,315	229,535	13,033,996
2003	Sect. 98 Seats	5	6	6	4	18	9	16	5	8	9	11	7	14	3	4	7	5	3	6	8	3	3	160
2003	Sect. 96(4) Seats	2	2	2	1	2	1	1	2	1	1	1	2	2	2	1	1	2	2	2	2	1	3	36
2003	Total Seats	7	8	8	5	20	10	17	7	9	10	12	9	16	5	5	8	7	5	8	10	4	6	196
2002	Electors	379,044	514,149	511,115	303,928	1,467,751	716,608	1,327,145	384,361	644,279	746,138	880,632	570,299	1,089,482	262,742	312,556	550,503	436,236	254,061	450,057	647,035	224,307	226,604	12,899,032
2002	Sect. 98 Seats	5	6	6	4	18	9	16	5	8	9	11	7	14	3	4	7	5	3	6	8	3	3	160
2002	Sect. 96(4) Seats	2	2	2	1	2	1	1	2	1	1	1	2	2	2	1	1	2	2	2	2	1	3	36
2002	Total Seats	7	8	8	5	20	10	17	7	9	10	12	9	16	5	5	8	7	5	8	10	4	6	196
2001	Electors	369,427	500,673	500,738	291,730	1,461,334	708,430	1,305,582	377,428	637,066	732,798	863,019	562,123	1,069,619	254,802	305,698	543,205	424,513	247,513	440,768	634,843	217,572	225,007	12,673,888
2001	Sect. 98 Seats	5	6	6	4	18	9	16	5	8	9	11	7	14	3	4	7	5	3	6	8	3	3	160
2001	Sect. 96(4) Seats	2	2	2	1	2	1	1	2	1	1	1	2	2	2	1	1	2	2	2	2	1	3	36
2001	Total Seats	7	8	8	5	20	10	17	7	9	10	12	9	16	5	5	8	7	5	8	10	4	6	196
2000	Electors	360,497	489,776	491,288	282,079	1,440,682	698,558	1,285,973	369,073	633,457	717,764	838,687	554,698	1,046,102	247,280	299,606	534,694	417,264	240,444	426,193	623,506	212,280	218,861	12,428,762
2000	Sect. 98 Seats	5	6	6	4	19	9	17	5	8	9	11	7	13	3	4	7	5	3	5	8	3	3	160
2000	Sect. 96(4) Seats	2	2	2	1	2	1	1	2	1	1	1	2	2	2	1	1	2	2	2	2	1	3	36
2000	Total Seats	7	8	8	5	21	10	18	7	9	10	12	9	15	5	5	8	7	5	7	10	4	6	196
1999	Electors	352,537	472,661	475,558	275,485	1,385,547	678,509	1,253,416	360,026	622,331	697,656	812,478	545,238	1,007,410	237,935	292,652	524,651	405,414	229,434	412,474	609,655	206,884	213,111	12,071,062
1999	Sect. 98 Seats	5	6	6	4	18	9	17	5	8	9	11	7	13	3	4	7	5	3	6	8	3	3	160
1999	Sect. 96(4) Seats	2	2	2	1	2	1	1	2	1	1	1	2	2	2	1	1	2	2	2	2	1	3	36
1999	Total Seats	7	8	8	5	20	10	18	7	9	10	12	9	15	5	5	8	7	5	8	10	4	6	196
1998	Electors	343,809	459,534	464,223	270,197	1,337,083	660,585	1,228,908	350,809	612,770	682,723	794,453	534,980	980,725	230,576	286,174	515,847	397,711	220,903	404,050	595,791	201,808	205,541	11,779,200
1998	Sect. 98 Seats	5	6	6	4	18	9	17	5	8	9	11	7	13	3	4	7	5	3	6	8	3	3	160
1998	Sect. 96(4) Seats	2	2	2	1	2	1	1	2	1	1	1	2	2	2	1	1	2	2	2	2	1	3	36
1998	Total Seats	7	8	8	5	20	10	18	7	9	10	12	9	15	5	5	8	7	5	8	10	4	6	196
1997	Electors	336,165	448,098	454,913	268,200	1,326,487	652,734	1,213,589	342,347	622,957	676,963	780,136	528,107	961,240	224,077	281,089	510,310	391,585	217,318	398,055	584,998	197,620	202,108	11,619,096
1997	Sect. 98 Seats	5	6	6	4	18	9	17	5	9	9	11	7	13	3	4	7	5	3	5	8	3	3	160
1997	Sect. 96(4) Seats	2	2	2	1	2	1	1	2	1	1	1	2	2	2	1	1	2	2	2	2	1	3	36
1997	Total Seats	7	8	8	5	20	10	18	7	10	10	12	9	15	5	5	8	7	5	7	10	4	6	196
1996	Electors	329,929	436,002	449,901	269,906	1,305,511	642,990	1,196,445	336,158	596,639	675,528	766,300	520,720	938,583	217,508	275,882	503,602	388,455	213,174	393,318	574,591	195,867	196,128	11,423,137
1996	Sect. 98 Seats	5	6	6	4	18	9	17	5	8	9	11	7	13	3	4	7	5	3	6	8	3	3	160
1996	Sect. 96(4) Seats	2	2	2	1	2	1	1	2	1	1	1	2	2	2	1	1	2	2	2	2	1	3	36
1996	Total Seats	7	8	8	5	20	10	18	7	9	10	12	9	15	5	5	8	7	5	8	10	4	6	196
1995	Electors	327,824	429,790	447,187	269,385	1,296,243	640,065	1,187,657	335,273	596,373	669,224	752,817	515,976	921,601	210,972	270,920	503,039	388,114	209,546	391,053	568,481	195,897	184,708	11,312,145
1995	Sect. 98 Seats	5	6	6	4	18	9	17	5	8	9	11	7	13	3	4	7	5	3	6	8	3	3	160
1995	Sect. 96(4) Seats	2	2	2	1	2	1	1	2	1	1	1	2	2	2	1	1	2	2	2	2	1	3	36
1995	Total Seats	7	8	8	5	20	10	18	7	9	10	12	9	15	5	5	8	7	5	8	10	4	6	196
1994	Electors	325,566	411,899	445,298	267,463	1,299,879	641,360	1,185,288	332,541	596,373	665,135	744,055	508,691	901,027	202,889	263,700	504,676	390,335	204,631	388,335	561,186	191,722	181,232	11,213,281
1994	Sect. 98 Seats	5	6	6	4	18	9	17	5	8	9	11	7	13	3	4	7	6	3	5	8	3	3	160
1994	Sect. 96(4) Seats	2	2	2	1	2	1	1	2	1	1	1	2	2	2	1	1	2	2	2	2	1	3	36
1994	Total Seats	7	8	8	5	20	10	18	7	9	10	12	9	15	5	5	8	8	5	7	10	4	6	196
1993	Electors	312,006	406,926	435,260	261,898	1,235,959	632,422	1,140,808	326,913	596,366	646,199	726,192	500,947	876,591	199,391	259,271	503,470	386,668	200,192	380,192	554,607	184,090	178,697	10,945,065
1993	Sect. 98 Seats	4	6	6	4	18	9	17	5	9	9	11	7	13	3	4	7	6	3	5	8	3	3	160
1993	Sect. 96(4) Seats	2	2	2	1	2	1	1	2	1	1	1	2	2	2	1	1	2	2	2	2	1	3	36
1993	Total Seats	6	8	8	5	20	10	18	7	10	10	12	9	15	5	5	8	8	5	7	10	4	6	196
1992	Electors	315,101	398,936	433,862	254,057	1,263,667	622,127	1,116,072	323,653	596,413	639,275	719,289	494,706	858,638	200,601	255,493	493,503	367,189	196,031	371,192	546,992	181,168	174,177	10,822,142
1992	Sect. 98 Seats	5	6	6	4	19	9	16	5	9	9	11	7	13	3	4	7	5	3	5	8	3	3	160
1992	Sect. 96(4) Seats	2	2	2	1	2	1	1	2	1	1	1	2	2	2	1	1	2	2	2	2	1	3	36
1992	Total Seats	7	8	8	5	21	10	17	7	10	10	12	9	15	5	5	8	7	5	7	10	4	6	196
1991	Electors	308,086	389,052	430,752	243,659	1,255,273	619,880	1,101,017	321,252	596,413	634,383	708,758	489,914	864,279	194,956	251,484	487,807	363,291	196,255	362,255	538,308	177,830	166,860	10,701,764
1991	Sect. 98 Seats	5	6	6	4	19	9	16	5	9	9	11	7	13	3	4	7	5	3	5	8	3	3	160
1991	Sect. 96(4) Seats	2	2	2	1	2	1	1	2	1	1	1	2	2	2	1	1	2	2	2	2	1	3	36
1991	Total Seats	7	8	8	5	21	10	17	7	10	10	12	9	15	5	5	8	7	5	7	10	4	6	196
1990	Electors	294,088	369,468	417,274	229,244	1,190,630	606,611	1,057,474	314,304	596,410	611,288	694,516	478,144	847,524	186,614	244,473	476,841	342,786	184,366	349,068	517,784	166,367	166,031	10,341,305
1990	Sect. 98 Seats	5	6	6	4	18	9	16	5	9	10	11	7	13	3	4	7	5	3	5	8	3	3	160
1990	Sect. 96(4) Seats	2	2	2	1	2	1	1	2	1	1	1	2	2	2	1	1	2	2	2	2	1	3	36
1990	Total Seats	7	8	8	5	20	10	17	7	10	11	12	9	15	5	5	8	7	5	7	10	4	6	196
1989	Electors	289,668	360,811	397,323	229,244	1,177,720	599,504	1,033,334	308,109	596,410	601,756	682,807	469,209	823,261	179,408	236,115	467,338	336,815	177,700	341,856	505,097	160,093	166,193	10,139,771
1989	Sect. 98 Seats	5	6	6	4	19	9	16	5	9	9	11	7	13	3	4	7	5	3	5	8	3	3	160
1989	Sect. 96(4) Seats	2	2	2	1	2	1	1	2	1	1	1	2	2	2	1	1	2	2	2	2	1	3	36
1989	Total Seats	7	8	8	5	21	10	17	7	10	10	12	9	15	5	5	8	7	5	7	10	4	6	196
1988	Electors	271,792	349,888	385,865	216,420	1,158,088	585,181	1,009,845	301,015	592,210	588,439	669,276	463,476	811,373	175,029	226,866	458,005	308,953	171,260	331,893	499,486	155,548	141,448	9,871,356
1988	Sect. 98 Seats	4	6	6	3	19	9	16	5	10	10	11	8	13	3	4	7	5	3	5	8	3	2	160
1988	Sect. 96(4) Seats	2	2	2	1	2	1	1	2	1	1	1	2	2	2	1	1	2	2	2	2	1	3	36
1988	Total Seats	6	8	8	4	21	10	17	7	11	11	12	10	15	5	5	8	7	5	7	10	4	5	196
1987	Electors	265,951	334,063	329,464	217,276	1,088,640	571,109	969,634	295,181	591,074	570,194	628,373	437,171	784,989	161,927	214,939	451,926	229,510	163,745	318,755	457,225	152,289	141,445	9,374,880
1987	Sect. 98 Seats	4	6	6	4	18	10	16	5	10	10	11	7	13	3	4	8	4	3	5	8	3	2	160
1987	Sect. 96(4) Seats	2	2	2	1	2	1	1	2	1	1	1	2	2	2	1	1	2	2	2	2	1	3	36
1987	Total Seats	6	8	8	5	20	11	17	7	11	11	12	9	15	5	5	9	6	5	7	10	4	5	196
1986	Electors	255,783	324,317	319,127	209,926	1,060,813	560,709	943,343	284,948	580,798	554,855	612,723	423,246	762,468	153,477	211,351	443,821	220,675	159,265	308,215	447,426	149,916	135,065	9,122,267
1986	Sect. 98 Seats	4	6	5	4	19	10	16	5	10	10	11	7	13	3	4	8	4	3	5	8	3	2	160
1986	Sect. 96(4) Seats	2	2	2	1	2	1	1	2	1	1	1	2	2	2	1	1	2	2	2	2	1	3	36
1986	Total Seats	6	8	7	5	21	11	17	7	11	11	12	9	15	5	5	9	6	5	7	10	4	5	196
1985	Electors	248,179	315,911	313,697	205,122	1,060,830	555,527	923,981	277,084	569,743	548,186	618,817	439,753	738,892	154,896	206,461	439,469	215,560	154,391	298,893	449,178	149,495	132,593	9,016,658
1985	Sect. 98 Seats	4	5	5	4	19	10	16	5	10	10	11	8	13	3	4	8	4	3	5	8	3	2	160
1985	Sect. 96(4) Seats	2	2	2	1	2	1	1	2	1	1	1	2	2	2	1	1	2	2	2	2	1	3	36
1985	Total Seats	6	7	7	5	21	11	17	7	11	11	12	10	15	5	5	9	6	5	7	10	4	5	196
1984	Electors	238,647	308,332	306,111	196,965	1,047,904	552,856	910,981	269,298	555,302	540,316	609,248	436,052	730,696	152,136	203,025	432,689	215,910	148,853	294,358	440,731	148,064	132,081	8,870,555
1984	Sect. 98 Seats	4	6	5	3	19	10	16	5	10	10	11	8	13	3	4	8	4	3	5	8	3	2	160
1984	Sect. 96(4) Seats	2	2	2	1	2	1	1	2	1	1	1	2	2	2	1	1	2	2	2	2	1	3	36
1984	Total Seats	6	8	7	4	21	11	17	7	11	11	12	10	15	5	5	9	6	5	7	10	4	5	196
1979	Electors	185,286	245,950	255,749	157,765	911,251	483,005	778,344	222,040	463,414	469,501	530,517	386,962	670,230	111,405	175,225	380,107	187,101	112,411	243,581	375,005	119,872	108,493	7,573,214
1979	Sect. 98 Seats	4	5	6	3	19	10	17	5	10	10	11	8	14	2	4	8	4	2	5	8	3	2	160
1979	Sect. 96(4) Seats	2	2	2	1	2	1	1	2	1	1	1	2	2	2	1	1	2	2	2	2	1	3	36
1979	Total Seats	6	7	8	4	21	11	18	7	11	11	12	10	16	4	5	9	6	4	7	10	4	5	196
