= Vavuniya Polling Division =

Vavuniya
- Polling Division
- Coordinates: 8.795424°N 80.448831°E
- Country: Sri Lanka
- Province: Northern Province, Sri Lanka
- Electoral District: Vanni Electoral District

Area
  - Total: 1,928.44 km^{2} (744.57 sq mi)

Population (2012)
  - Total: 172,115
  - Density: 89/km^{2} (230/sq mi)
- ISO 3166 code: EC-11B

The Vavuniya Polling Division is a Polling Division in the Vanni Electoral District, in the Northern Province, Sri Lanka.

== Presidential Election Results ==
=== Summary ===
The winner of Vavuniya has matched the final country result 4 out of 8 times.

Year	Vavuniya	Vanni Electoral District	MAE %	Sri Lanka	MAE %
2019	NDF	NDF	4.04%	SLPP	33.87%
2015	NDF	NDF	3.25%	NDF	24.17%
2010	NDF	NDF	0.91%	UPFA	27.38%
2005	UNP	UNP	1.49%	UPFA	30.85%
1999	UNP	UNP	6.18%	PA	30.88%
1994	PA	PA	3.31%	PA	19.83%
1988	UNP	UNP	5.67%	UNP	8.67%
1982	UNP	UNP	2.74%	UNP	5.47%
Matches/Mean MAE	4/8	4/8	3.45%	8/8	22.64%

=== 2019 Sri Lankan Presidential Election ===
Party	Vavuniya		Vanni Electoral District		Sri Lanka	
Party	Votes	%	Votes	%	Votes	%
NDF	65,141	77.83%	174,739	82.12%	5,564,239	41.99%
SLPP	13,715	16.39%	26,105	12.27%	6,924,255	52.25%
Other Parties (with < 1%)	3,944	4.71%	9,388	4.41%	729,468	5.50%
DUNF	901	1.08%	2,546	1.20%	34,537	0.26%
Valid Votes	83,701	98.43%	212,778	98.48%	13,252,499	98.99%
Rejected Votes	1,331	1.57%	3,294	1.52%	135,452	1.01%
Total Polled	85,032	75.12%	216,072	76.59%	13,387,951	83.71%
Registered Electors	113,193		282,119		15,992,568	

=== 2015 Sri Lankan Presidential Election ===
Party	Vavuniya		Vanni Electoral District		Sri Lanka	
Party	Votes	%	Votes	%	Votes	%
NDF	55,683	75.17%	141,417	78.47%	6,217,162	51.28%
UPFA	16,678	22.51%	34,377	19.07%	5,768,090	47.58%
Other Parties (with < 1%)	1,719	2.32%	4,431	2.46%	138,200	1.14%
Valid Votes	74,080	98.18%	180,225	98.14%	12,123,452	98.85%
Rejected Votes	1,371	1.82%	3,416	1.86%	140,925	1.15%
Total Polled	75,451	68.78%	183,641	70.25%	12,264,377	78.69%
Registered Electors	109,705		261,422		15,585,942	

=== 2010 Sri Lankan Presidential Election ===
Party	Vavuniya		Vanni Electoral District		Sri Lanka	
Party	Votes	%	Votes	%	Votes	%
NDF	31,796	66.02%	70,367	66.86%	4,173,185	40.15%
UPFA	13,742	28.53%	28,740	27.31%	6,015,934	57.88%
Other Parties (with < 1%)	2,056	4.27%	4,124	3.92%	165,268	1.59%
DUNF	569	1.18%	2,021	1.92%	39,226	0.38%
Valid Votes	48,163	97.30%	105,252	97.75%	10,393,613	99.03%
Rejected Votes	1,335	2.70%	2,428	2.25%	101,838	0.97%
Total Polled	49,498	43.83%	107,680	19.60%	10,495,451	66.70%
Registered Electors	112,924		549,344		15,734,587	

=== 2005 Sri Lankan Presidential Election ===
Party	Vavuniya		Vanni Electoral District		Sri Lanka	
Party	Votes	%	Votes	%	Votes	%
UNP	33,553	79.39%	65,798	77.89%	4,706,366	48.43%
UPFA	7,936	18.78%	17,197	20.36%	4,887,152	50.29%
Other Parties (with < 1%)	773	1.83%	1,481	1.75%	123,521	1.27%
Valid Votes	42,262	98.22%	84,476	98.37%	9,717,039	98.88%
Rejected Votes	766	1.78%	1,398	1.63%	109,869	1.12%
Total Polled	43,028	41.02%	85,874	16.66%	9,826,908	69.51%
Registered Electors	104,884		515,573		14,136,979	

=== 1999 Sri Lankan Presidential Election ===
Party	Vavuniya		Vanni Electoral District		Sri Lanka	
Party	Votes	%	Votes	%	Votes	%
UNP	27,621	76.13%	43,803	69.87%	3,602,748	42.71%
PA	6,845	18.87%	16,202	25.84%	4,312,157	51.12%
Other Parties (with < 1%)	1,389	3.83%	2,203	3.51%	176,679	2.09%
JVP	427	1.18%	482	0.77%	343,927	4.08%
Valid Votes	36,282	97.40%	62,690	97.68%	8,435,754	97.69%
Rejected Votes	968	2.60%	1,490	2.32%	199,536	2.31%
Total Polled	37,250	42.83%	64,180	31.13%	8,635,290	72.17%
Registered Electors	86,970		206,176		11,965,536	

=== 1994 Sri Lankan Presidential Election ===
Party	Vavuniya		Vanni Electoral District		Sri Lanka	
Party	Votes	%	Votes	%	Votes	%
PA	16,861	81.87%	33,585	85.30%	4,709,205	62.28%
UNP	3,026	14.69%	4,493	11.41%	2,715,283	35.91%
Ind 2	499	2.42%	1,003	2.55%	58,888	0.78%
Other Parties (with < 1%)	209	1.01%	291	0.74%	78,152	1.03%
Valid Votes	20,595	97.89%	39,372	98.30%	7,561,526	98.03%
Rejected Votes	444	2.11%	681	1.70%	151,706	1.97%
Total Polled	21,039	29.05%	40,053	22.27%	7,713,232	69.12%
Registered Electors	72,434		179,858		11,158,880	

=== 1988 Sri Lankan Presidential Election ===
Party	Vavuniya		Vanni Electoral District		Sri Lanka	
Party	Votes	%	Votes	%	Votes	%
UNP	2,982	48.51%	10,580	55.78%	2,569,199	50.43%
SLFP	1,819	29.59%	4,889	25.77%	2,289,857	44.95%
SLMP	1,346	21.90%	3,500	18.45%	235,701	4.63%
Valid Votes	6,147	96.39%	18,969	96.40%	5,094,754	98.24%
Rejected Votes	230	3.61%	708	3.60%	91,499	1.76%
Total Polled	6,377	100.00%	19,677	20.70%	5,186,256	55.87%
Registered Electors	6,377		95,061		9,283,143	

=== 1982 Sri Lankan Presidential Election ===
Party	Vavuniya		Vanni Electoral District		Sri Lanka	
Party	Votes	%	Votes	%	Votes	%
UNP	11,720	45.26%	32,834	46.42%	3,450,815	52.93%
SLFP	9,385	36.24%	23,221	32.83%	2,546,348	39.05%
ACTC	2,689	10.38%	11,521	16.29%	173,934	2.67%
JVP	1,764	6.81%	2,286	3.23%	273,428	4.19%
Other Parties (with < 1%)	339	1.31%	877	1.24%	75,526	1.16%
Valid Votes	25,897	96.47%	70,739	96.66%	6,520,156	98.78%
Rejected Votes	947	3.53%	2,447	3.34%	80,470	1.22%
Total Polled	26,844	61.49%	73,186	60.87%	6,600,626	80.15%
Registered Electors	43,656		120,235		8,235,358	

== Parliamentary Election Results ==
=== Summary ===
The winner of Vavuniya has matched the final country result 0 out of 7 times.

Year	Vavuniya	Vanni Electoral District	MAE %	Sri Lanka	MAE %
2015	ITAK	ITAK	5.33%	UNP	21.92%
2010	ITAK	ITAK	2.29%	UPFA	25.20%
2004	ITAK	ITAK	10.50%	UPFA	28.26%
2001	TULF	TULF	6.93%	UNP	27.37%
2000	TELO	TELO	3.14%	PA	23.97%
1994	SLMC	DPLF	16.09%	PA	20.60%
1989	TULF	TULF	5.51%	UNP	21.63%
Matches/Mean MAE	0/7	0/7	7.11%	7/7	24.14%

=== 2015 Sri Lankan Parliamentary Election ===
Party	Vavuniya		Vanni Electoral District		Sri Lanka	
Party	Votes	%	Votes	%	Votes	%
ITAK	31,836	48.36%	89,886	54.79%	515,963	4.63%
UPFA	14,402	21.88%	20,965	12.78%	4,732,664	42.48%
UNP	14,380	21.84%	39,513	24.09%	5,098,916	45.77%
Other Parties (with < 1%)	1,646	2.50%	7,497	4.57%	85,084	0.76%
PP	1,417	2.15%	2,022	1.23%	4,272	0.04%
EPDP	748	1.14%	2,120	1.29%	33,481	0.30%
JVP	701	1.06%	876	0.53%	544,154	4.88%
AITC	699	1.06%	1,174	0.72%	18,644	0.17%
Valid Votes	65,829	90.59%	164,053	90.17%	11,140,333	95.35%
Rejected Votes	6,423	8.84%	17,155	9.43%	516,926	4.42%
Total Polled	72,669	66.24%	181,930	71.89%	11,684,111	77.66%
Registered Electors	109,705		253,058		15,044,490	

=== 2010 Sri Lankan Parliamentary Election ===
Party	Vavuniya		Vanni Electoral District		Sri Lanka	
Party	Votes	%	Votes	%	Votes	%
ITAK	17,372	39.45%	41,673	39.02%	233,190	2.91%
UPFA	13,714	31.14%	37,522	35.13%	4,846,388	60.38%
DPLF	4,200	9.54%	5,900	5.52%	6,036	0.08%
UNP	3,638	8.26%	12,783	11.97%	2,357,057	29.37%
IG1V	1,573	3.57%	1,979	1.85%	1,979	0.02%
EPDP	1,405	3.19%	2,867	2.68%	2,867	0.04%
EDF	797	1.81%	1,394	1.31%	3,709	0.05%
Other Parties (with < 1%)	716	1.63%	1,620	1.52%	490,576	6.11%
TULF	625	1.42%	1,073	1.00%	9,223	0.11%
Valid Votes	44,040	90.53%	106,811	91.15%	8,026,322	96.03%
Rejected Votes	4,481	9.21%	10,208	8.71%	581,465	6.96%
Total Polled	48,646	43.08%	117,185	38.53%	8,358,246	59.29%
Registered Electors	112,924		304,111		14,097,690	

=== 2004 Sri Lankan Parliamentary Election ===
Party	Vavuniya		Vanni Electoral District		Sri Lanka	
Party	Votes	%	Votes	%	Votes	%
ITAK	35,012	62.09%	90,252	74.68%	633,203	6.85%
UNP	10,724	19.02%	16,213	13.42%	3,486,792	37.73%
DPLF	4,908	8.70%	6,028	4.99%	7,038	0.08%
UPFA	4,713	8.36%	6,415	5.31%	4,223,126	45.70%
Other Parties (with < 1%)	1,029	1.82%	1,940	1.61%	616,556	6.67%
Valid Votes	56,386	92.09%	120,848	92.59%	9,241,931	94.52%
Rejected Votes	4,846	7.91%	9,665	7.41%	534,452	5.47%
Total Polled	61,232	61.12%	130,513	57.60%	9,777,821	75.74%
Registered Electors	100,185		226,604		12,909,631	

=== 2001 Sri Lankan Parliamentary Election ===
Party	Vavuniya		Vanni Electoral District		Sri Lanka	
Party	Votes	%	Votes	%	Votes	%
TULF	23,965	49.51%	41,950	44.39%	348,164	3.89%
DPLF	8,316	17.18%	9,614	10.17%	16,669	0.19%
UNP	7,069	14.60%	26,575	28.12%	4,086,026	45.62%
PA	4,119	8.51%	7,831	8.29%	3,330,815	37.19%
IND7	2,645	5.46%	2,810	2.97%	3,275	0.04%
EPDP	1,100	2.27%	3,404	3.60%	72,783	0.81%
Other Parties (with < 1%)	654	1.35%	1,639	1.73%	127,450	1.42%
JVP	535	1.11%	683	0.72%	815,353	9.10%
Valid Votes	48,403	91.26%	94,506	92.33%	8,955,844	94.77%
Rejected Votes	4,635	8.74%	7,855	7.67%	494,009	5.23%
Total Polled	53,038	55.92%	102,361	46.77%	9,449,878	76.03%
Registered Electors	94,853		218,861		12,428,762	

=== 2000 Sri Lankan Parliamentary Election ===
Party	Vavuniya		Vanni Electoral District		Sri Lanka	
Party	Votes	%	Votes	%	Votes	%
TELO	11,325	26.57%	21,423	32.03%	25,830	0.30%
UNP	8,335	19.56%	10,618	15.88%	3,451,765	40.12%
DPLF	5,484	12.87%	6,847	10.24%	20,655	0.24%
PA	5,110	11.99%	6,323	9.45%	3,899,329	45.33%
TULF	2,709	6.36%	4,610	6.89%	105,907	1.23%
NUA	2,294	5.38%	4,280	6.40%	185,593	2.16%
IG4	1,937	4.54%	3,419	5.11%	5,792	0.07%
IG5	1,518	3.56%	1,570	2.35%	4,327	0.05%
EPDP	1,129	2.65%	1,317	1.97%	50,702	0.59%
PP	891	2.09%	1,108	1.66%	19,830	0.23%
Other Parties (with < 1%)	871	2.04%	2,318	3.47%	737,611	8.57%
ACTC	522	1.22%	717	1.07%	27,289	0.32%
IG7	496	1.16%	2,325	3.48%	2,382	0.03%
Valid Votes	42,621	N/A	66,875	N/A	8,602,617	N/A

=== 1994 Sri Lankan Parliamentary Election ===
Party	Vavuniya		Vanni Electoral District		Sri Lanka	
Party	Votes	%	Votes	%	Votes	%
SLMC	906	40.98%	8,142	19.26%	143,307	1.80%
UNP	799	36.14%	7,850	18.57%	3,498,370	44.04%
PA	342	15.47%	5,583	13.21%	3,887,805	48.94%
IND2	82	3.71%	1,880	4.45%	16,690	0.21%
EPRLF	53	2.40%	3,465	8.20%	9,411	0.12%
Other Parties (with < 1%)	29	1.31%	15,351	36.32%	194,664	2.45%
Valid Votes	2,211	94.65%	42,271	93.35%	7,943,688	95.20%
Rejected Votes	125	5.35%	3,009	6.65%	400,395	4.80%
Total Polled	2,336	4.48%	45,280	25.23%	8,344,095	74.75%
Registered Electors	52,197		179,435		11,163,064	

=== 1989 Sri Lankan Parliamentary Election ===
Party	Vavuniya		Vanni Electoral District		Sri Lanka	
Party	Votes	%	Votes	%	Votes	%
TULF	8,750	43.48%	17,271	39.99%	188,594	3.37%
UNP	5,423	26.95%	8,525	19.74%	2,838,005	50.71%
IND	2,479	12.32%	7,879	18.24%	12,285	0.22%
SLMC	2,073	10.30%	7,945	18.40%	202,016	3.61%
SLFP	1,398	6.95%	1,568	3.63%	1,785,369	31.90%
Valid Votes	20,123	91.68%	43,188	90.64%	5,596,468	93.87%
Rejected Votes	1,827	8.32%	4,462	9.36%	365,563	6.13%
Total Polled	21,950	40.85%	47,650	33.69%	5,962,031	63.60%
Registered Electors	53,733		141,448		9,374,164	

== Demographics ==
=== Ethnicity ===
The Vavuniya Polling Division has a Sri Lankan Tamil majority (82.0%) . In comparison, the Vanni Electoral District (which contains the Vavuniya Polling Division) has a Sri Lankan Tamil majority (82.5%)

Ethnicity in Vavuniya
1. Sri Lankan Tamil (82.0%)
2. Sinhalese (10.0%)
3. Moor (6.80%)
4. Indian Tamil (1.10%)
5. Other (0.10%)

=== Religion ===
The Vavuniya Polling Division has a Hindu majority (69.4%) . In comparison, the Vanni Electoral District (which contains the Vavuniya Polling Division) has a Hindu majority (58.5%) and a significant Roman Catholic population (21.1%)

Religion in Vavuniya
1. Hindu (69.4%)
2. Buddhist (9.80%)
3. Roman Catholic (8.90%)
4. Muslim (7.00%)
5. Other Christian (4.90%)
6. Other (0.00%)
