= Mullaitivu Polling Division =

Mullaitivu
- Polling Division
- Coordinates: 9.123436°N 80.669748°E
- Country: Sri Lanka
- Province: Northern Province, Sri Lanka
- Electoral District: Vanni Electoral District

Area
  - Total: 2,712.46 km^{2} (1,047.29 sq mi)

Population (2012)
  - Total: 92,238
  - Density: 34/km^{2} (88/sq mi)
- ISO 3166 code: EC-11C

The Mullaitivu Polling Division is a Polling Division in the Vanni Electoral District, in the Northern Province, Sri Lanka.

== Presidential Election Results ==
=== Summary ===
The winner of Mullaitivu has matched the final country result 5 out of 8 times. Hence, Mullaitivu is a Weak Bellwether for Presidential Elections.

Year	Mullaitivu	Vanni Electoral District	MAE %	Sri Lanka	MAE %
2019	NDF	NDF	3.91%	SLPP	41.93%
2015	NDF	NDF	0.65%	NDF	28.42%
2010	NDF	NDF	6.86%	UPFA	36.23%
2005	UPFA	UNP	35.66%	UPFA	6.73%
1999	PA	UNP	35.58%	PA	10.65%
1994	PA	PA	8.95%	PA	13.62%
1988	UNP	UNP	2.29%	UNP	9.54%
1982	ACTC	UNP	15.40%	UNP	19.27%
Matches/Mean MAE	5/8	4/8	13.66%	8/8	20.80%

=== 2019 Sri Lankan Presidential Election ===
Party	Mullaitivu		Vanni Electoral District		Sri Lanka	
Party	Votes	%	Votes	%	Votes	%
NDF	47,594	86.19%	174,739	82.12%	5,564,239	41.99%
SLPP	4,252	7.70%	26,105	12.27%	6,924,255	52.25%
Other Parties (with < 1%)	2,469	4.47%	9,388	4.41%	729,468	5.50%
DUNF	902	1.63%	2,546	1.20%	34,537	0.26%
Valid Votes	55,217	98.26%	212,778	98.48%	13,252,499	98.99%
Rejected Votes	979	1.74%	3,294	1.52%	135,452	1.01%
Total Polled	56,196	77.47%	216,072	76.59%	13,387,951	83.71%
Registered Electors	72,538		282,119		15,992,568	

=== 2015 Sri Lankan Presidential Election ===
Party	Mullaitivu		Vanni Electoral District		Sri Lanka	
Party	Votes	%	Votes	%	Votes	%
NDF	35,441	78.95%	141,417	78.47%	6,217,162	51.28%
UPFA	7,935	17.68%	34,377	19.07%	5,768,090	47.58%
Other Parties (with < 1%)	1,513	3.37%	4,431	2.46%	138,200	1.14%
Valid Votes	44,889	97.71%	180,225	98.14%	12,123,452	98.85%
Rejected Votes	1,052	2.29%	3,416	1.86%	140,925	1.15%
Total Polled	45,941	71.87%	183,641	70.25%	12,264,377	78.69%
Registered Electors	63,920		261,422		15,585,942	

=== 2010 Sri Lankan Presidential Election ===
Party	Mullaitivu		Vanni Electoral District		Sri Lanka	
Party	Votes	%	Votes	%	Votes	%
NDF	6,882	73.47%	70,367	66.86%	4,173,185	40.15%
UPFA	1,726	18.43%	28,740	27.31%	6,015,934	57.88%
Other Parties (with < 1%)	423	4.52%	3,333	3.17%	141,978	1.37%
DUNF	237	2.53%	2,021	1.92%	39,226	0.38%
UDF	99	1.06%	791	0.75%	23,290	0.22%
Valid Votes	9,367	97.32%	105,252	97.75%	10,393,613	99.03%
Rejected Votes	258	2.68%	2,428	2.25%	101,838	0.97%
Total Polled	9,625	14.00%	107,680	19.60%	10,495,451	66.70%
Registered Electors	68,729		549,344		15,734,587	

=== 2005 Sri Lankan Presidential Election ===
Party	Mullaitivu		Vanni Electoral District		Sri Lanka	
Party	Votes	%	Votes	%	Votes	%
UPFA	510	57.24%	17,197	20.36%	4,887,152	50.29%
UNP	372	41.75%	65,798	77.89%	4,706,366	48.43%
Other Parties (with < 1%)	9	1.01%	1,481	1.75%	123,521	1.27%
Valid Votes	891	98.78%	84,476	98.37%	9,717,039	98.88%
Rejected Votes	11	1.22%	1,398	1.63%	109,869	1.12%
Total Polled	902	1.35%	85,874	16.66%	9,826,908	69.51%
Registered Electors	66,596		515,573		14,136,979	

=== 1999 Sri Lankan Presidential Election ===
Party	Mullaitivu		Vanni Electoral District		Sri Lanka	
Party	Votes	%	Votes	%	Votes	%
PA	751	63.54%	16,202	25.84%	4,312,157	51.12%
UNP	389	32.91%	43,803	69.87%	3,602,748	42.71%
Other Parties (with < 1%)	27	2.28%	2,203	3.51%	176,679	2.09%
JVP	15	1.27%	482	0.77%	343,927	4.08%
Valid Votes	1,182	97.52%	62,690	97.68%	8,435,754	97.69%
Rejected Votes	30	2.48%	1,490	2.32%	199,536	2.31%
Total Polled	1,212	2.30%	64,180	31.13%	8,635,290	72.17%
Registered Electors	52,688		206,176		11,965,536	

=== 1994 Sri Lankan Presidential Election ===
Party	Mullaitivu		Vanni Electoral District		Sri Lanka	
Party	Votes	%	Votes	%	Votes	%
PA	1,128	76.32%	33,585	85.30%	4,709,205	62.28%
UNP	330	22.33%	4,493	11.41%	2,715,283	35.91%
Other Parties (with < 1%)	20	1.35%	1,294	3.29%	137,040	1.81%
Valid Votes	1,478	98.21%	39,372	98.30%	7,561,526	98.03%
Rejected Votes	27	1.79%	681	1.70%	151,706	1.97%
Total Polled	1,505	2.88%	40,053	22.27%	7,713,232	69.12%
Registered Electors	52,197		179,858		11,158,880	

=== 1988 Sri Lankan Presidential Election ===
Party	Mullaitivu		Vanni Electoral District		Sri Lanka	
Party	Votes	%	Votes	%	Votes	%
UNP	3,098	52.90%	10,580	55.78%	2,569,199	50.43%
SLFP	1,639	27.99%	4,889	25.77%	2,289,857	44.95%
SLMP	1,119	19.11%	3,500	18.45%	235,701	4.63%
Valid Votes	5,856	94.68%	18,969	96.40%	5,094,754	98.24%
Rejected Votes	329	5.32%	708	3.60%	91,499	1.76%
Total Polled	6,185	14.86%	19,677	20.70%	5,186,256	55.87%
Registered Electors	41,624		95,061		9,283,143	

=== 1982 Sri Lankan Presidential Election ===
Party	Mullaitivu		Vanni Electoral District		Sri Lanka	
Party	Votes	%	Votes	%	Votes	%
ACTC	6,654	40.97%	11,521	16.29%	173,934	2.67%
SLFP	5,471	33.69%	23,221	32.83%	2,546,348	39.05%
UNP	3,678	22.65%	32,834	46.42%	3,450,815	52.93%
Other Parties (with < 1%)	234	1.44%	877	1.24%	75,526	1.16%
JVP	204	1.26%	2,286	3.23%	273,428	4.19%
Valid Votes	16,241	94.36%	70,739	96.66%	6,520,156	98.78%
Rejected Votes	971	5.64%	2,447	3.34%	80,470	1.22%
Total Polled	17,212	49.93%	73,186	60.87%	6,600,626	80.15%
Registered Electors	34,472		120,235		8,235,358	

== Parliamentary Election Results ==
=== Summary ===
The winner of Mullaitivu has matched the final country result 1 out of 7 times.

Year	Mullaitivu	Vanni Electoral District	MAE %	Sri Lanka	MAE %
2015	ITAK	ITAK	11.73%	UNP	32.00%
2010	ITAK	ITAK	11.41%	UPFA	32.48%
2004	ITAK	ITAK	18.68%	UPFA	40.65%
2001	PA	TULF	27.52%	UNP	7.60%
2000	PA	TELO	20.13%	PA	15.16%
1994	DPLF	DPLF	5.90%	PA	23.50%
1989	TULF	TULF	7.23%	UNP	34.73%
Matches/Mean MAE	1/7	0/7	14.66%	7/7	26.59%

=== 2015 Sri Lankan Parliamentary Election ===
Party	Mullaitivu		Vanni Electoral District		Sri Lanka	
Party	Votes	%	Votes	%	Votes	%
ITAK	27,269	71.14%	89,886	54.79%	515,963	4.63%
UNP	6,244	16.29%	39,513	24.09%	5,098,916	45.77%
UPFA	2,582	6.74%	20,965	12.78%	4,732,664	42.48%
Other Parties (with < 1%)	1,267	3.31%	11,569	7.05%	652,154	5.85%
EPDP	970	2.53%	2,120	1.29%	33,481	0.30%
Valid Votes	38,332	86.16%	164,053	90.17%	11,140,333	95.35%
Rejected Votes	6,012	13.51%	17,155	9.43%	516,926	4.42%
Total Polled	44,487	69.60%	181,930	71.89%	11,684,111	77.66%
Registered Electors	63,920		253,058		15,044,490	

=== 2010 Sri Lankan Parliamentary Election ===
Party	Mullaitivu		Vanni Electoral District		Sri Lanka	
Party	Votes	%	Votes	%	Votes	%
ITAK	5,241	53.79%	41,673	39.02%	233,190	2.91%
UPFA	2,238	22.97%	37,522	35.13%	4,846,388	60.38%
EPDP	593	6.09%	2,867	2.68%	2,867	0.04%
DPLF	527	5.41%	5,900	5.52%	6,036	0.08%
EDF	393	4.03%	1,394	1.31%	3,709	0.05%
UNP	169	1.73%	12,783	11.97%	2,357,057	29.37%
IG9V	145	1.49%	262	0.25%	262	0.00%
IG1V	131	1.34%	1,979	1.85%	1,979	0.02%
TULF	124	1.27%	1,073	1.00%	9,223	0.11%
DUA	114	1.17%	506	0.47%	1,270	0.02%
Other Parties (with < 1%)	69	0.71%	852	0.80%	489,044	6.09%
Valid Votes	9,744	85.76%	106,811	91.15%	8,026,322	96.03%
Rejected Votes	1,610	14.17%	10,208	8.71%	581,465	6.96%
Total Polled	11,362	16.53%	117,185	38.53%	8,358,246	59.29%
Registered Electors	68,729		304,111		14,097,690	

=== 2004 Sri Lankan Parliamentary Election ===
Party	Mullaitivu		Vanni Electoral District		Sri Lanka	
Party	Votes	%	Votes	%	Votes	%
ITAK	27,667	96.85%	90,252	74.68%	633,203	6.85%
Other Parties (with < 1%)	509	1.78%	24,181	20.01%	4,110,386	44.48%
UPFA	391	1.37%	6,415	5.31%	4,223,126	45.70%
Valid Votes	28,567	93.78%	120,848	92.59%	9,241,931	94.52%
Rejected Votes	1,895	6.22%	9,665	7.41%	534,452	5.47%
Total Polled	30,462	57.00%	130,513	57.60%	9,777,821	75.74%
Registered Electors	53,439		226,604		12,909,631	

=== 2001 Sri Lankan Parliamentary Election ===
Party	Mullaitivu		Vanni Electoral District		Sri Lanka	
Party	Votes	%	Votes	%	Votes	%
PA	298	49.50%	7,831	8.29%	3,330,815	37.19%
UNP	237	39.37%	26,575	28.12%	4,086,026	45.62%
JVP	56	9.30%	683	0.72%	815,353	9.10%
Other Parties (with < 1%)	11	1.83%	59,417	62.87%	568,341	6.35%
Valid Votes	602	95.56%	94,506	92.33%	8,955,844	94.77%
Rejected Votes	28	4.44%	7,855	7.67%	494,009	5.23%
Total Polled	630	1.19%	102,361	46.77%	9,449,878	76.03%
Registered Electors	53,158		218,861		12,428,762	

=== 2000 Sri Lankan Parliamentary Election ===
Party	Mullaitivu		Vanni Electoral District		Sri Lanka	
Party	Votes	%	Votes	%	Votes	%
PA	439	67.33%	6,323	9.45%	3,899,329	45.33%
UNP	182	27.91%	10,618	15.88%	3,451,765	40.12%
JVP	18	2.76%	412	0.62%	518,725	6.03%
Other Parties (with < 1%)	13	1.99%	49,522	74.05%	667,193	7.76%
Valid Votes	652	N/A	66,875	N/A	8,602,617	N/A

=== 1994 Sri Lankan Parliamentary Election ===
Party	Mullaitivu		Vanni Electoral District		Sri Lanka	
Party	Votes	%	Votes	%	Votes	%
DPLF	7,080	32.63%	11,567	27.36%	11,567	0.15%
PA	4,869	22.44%	5,583	13.21%	3,887,805	48.94%
UNP	4,497	20.73%	7,850	18.57%	3,498,370	44.04%
TULF	1,756	8.09%	3,039	7.19%	132,461	1.67%
EPRLF	1,465	6.75%	3,465	8.20%	9,411	0.12%
SLMC	1,412	6.51%	8,142	19.26%	143,307	1.80%
IND1	502	2.31%	624	1.48%	48,199	0.61%
Other Parties (with < 1%)	116	0.53%	2,001	4.73%	19,127	0.24%
Valid Votes	21,697	92.47%	42,271	93.35%	7,943,688	95.20%
Rejected Votes	1,766	7.53%	3,009	6.65%	400,395	4.80%
Total Polled	23,463	32.39%	45,280	25.23%	8,344,095	74.75%
Registered Electors	72,434		179,435		11,163,064	

=== 1989 Sri Lankan Parliamentary Election ===
Party	Mullaitivu		Vanni Electoral District		Sri Lanka	
Party	Votes	%	Votes	%	Votes	%
TULF	2,937	38.03%	17,271	39.99%	188,594	3.37%
IND	2,882	37.32%	7,879	18.24%	12,285	0.22%
SLMC	1,440	18.65%	7,945	18.40%	202,016	3.61%
UNP	426	5.52%	8,525	19.74%	2,838,005	50.71%
Other Parties (with < 1%)	37	0.48%	1,568	3.63%	1,785,369	31.90%
Valid Votes	7,722	85.52%	43,188	90.64%	5,596,468	93.87%
Rejected Votes	1,307	14.48%	4,462	9.36%	365,563	6.13%
Total Polled	9,029	22.45%	47,650	33.69%	5,962,031	63.60%
Registered Electors	40,224		141,448		9,374,164	

== Demographics ==
=== Ethnicity ===
The Mullaitivu Polling Division has a Sri Lankan Tamil majority (85.8%) . In comparison, the Vanni Electoral District (which contains the Mullaitivu Polling Division) has a Sri Lankan Tamil majority (82.5%)

Ethnicity in Mullaitivu
1. Sri Lankan Tamil (85.8%)
2. Sinhalese (9.70%)
3. Indian Tamil (2.50%)
4. Moor (2.00%)
5. Other (0.10%)

=== Religion ===
The Mullaitivu Polling Division has a Hindu majority (75.2%) . In comparison, the Vanni Electoral District (which contains the Mullaitivu Polling Division) has a Hindu majority (58.5%) and a significant Roman Catholic population (21.1%)

Religion in Mullaitivu
1. Hindu (75.2%)
2. Roman Catholic (9.80%)
3. Buddhist (8.90%)
4. Other Christian (4.00%)
5. Muslim (2.00%)
6. Other (0.10%)
