= Talaimannar Grama Niladhari Division =

Talaimannar
- Grama Niladhari Division
- Interactive map of Talaimannar
- Coordinates: 9.088201°N 79.728159°E
- Country: Sri Lanka
- Province: Northern Province
- District: Mannar District
- Divisional Secretariat: Mannar Town Divisional Secretariat
- Electoral District: Vanni Electoral District
- Polling Division: Mannar Polling Division

Area
  - Total: 5.27 km^{2} (2.03 sq mi)
- Elevation: 0 m (0 ft)

Population (2012)
  - Total: 754
  - Density: 143/km^{2} (370/sq mi)
- ISO 3166 code: LK-4203020

Talaimannar

Talaimannar Grama Niladhari Division is a Grama Niladhari Division of the Mannar Town Divisional Secretariat of Mannar District of Northern Province, Sri Lanka. It has Grama Niladhari Division Code MN/52.

Talaimannar is a surrounded by the Talaimannar South, Kaddukarankudiyiruppu, Talaimannar Pier East, Talaimannar North and Talaimannar Pier West Grama Niladhari Divisions.

== Demographics ==
=== Ethnicity ===
The Talaimannar Grama Niladhari Division has a Sri Lankan Tamil majority (83.7%) and a significant Sinhalese population (14.2%). In comparison, the Mannar Town Divisional Secretariat (which contains the Talaimannar Grama Niladhari Division) has a Sri Lankan Tamil majority (79.0%) and a significant Moor population (17.8%)

Ethnicity in Talaimannar
1. Sri Lankan Tamil (83.7%)
2. Sinhalese (14.2%)
3. Indian Tamil (1.60%)
4. Other (0.50%)

=== Religion ===
The Talaimannar Grama Niladhari Division has a Hindu plurality (49.9%), a significant Roman Catholic population (28.1%) and a significant Buddhist population (14.3%). In comparison, the Mannar Town Divisional Secretariat (which contains the Talaimannar Grama Niladhari Division) has a Roman Catholic majority (54.8%), a significant Hindu population (20.4%) and a significant Muslim population (17.8%)

Religion in Talaimannar
1. Hindu (49.9%)
2. Roman Catholic (28.1%)
3. Buddhist (14.3%)
4. Other Christian (7.20%)
5. Other (0.50%)
