= Mannar Polling Division =

Mannar
- Polling Division
- Coordinates: 8.979680°N 79.919456°E
- Country: Sri Lanka
- Province: Northern Province, Sri Lanka
- Electoral District: Vanni Electoral District

Area
  - Total: 2,144.03 km^{2} (827.81 sq mi)

Population (2012)
  - Total: 99,570
  - Density: 46/km^{2} (120/sq mi)
- ISO 3166 code: EC-11A

The Mannar Polling Division is a Polling Division in the Vanni Electoral District, in the Northern Province, Sri Lanka.

== Presidential Election Results ==
=== Summary ===
The winner of Mannar has matched the final country result 4 out of 8 times.

Year	Mannar	Vanni Electoral District	MAE %	Sri Lanka	MAE %
2019	NDF	NDF	2.40%	SLPP	40.03%
2015	NDF	NDF	6.43%	NDF	33.93%
2010	NDF	NDF	3.38%	UPFA	32.16%
2005	UNP	UNP	10.65%	UPFA	40.05%
1999	UNP	UNP	7.32%	PA	17.24%
1994	PA	PA	5.01%	PA	28.28%
1988	UNP	UNP	6.93%	UNP	18.59%
1982	UNP	UNP	9.95%	UNP	8.80%
Matches/Mean MAE	4/8	4/8	6.51%	8/8	27.38%

=== 2019 Sri Lankan Presidential Election ===
Party	Mannar		Vanni Electoral District		Sri Lanka	
Party	Votes	%	Votes	%	Votes	%
NDF	53,602	84.73%	174,739	82.12%	5,564,239	41.99%
SLPP	6,435	10.17%	26,105	12.27%	6,924,255	52.25%
Other Parties (with < 1%)	2,533	4.00%	9,388	4.41%	729,468	5.50%
DUNF	695	1.10%	2,546	1.20%	34,537	0.26%
Valid Votes	63,265	98.69%	212,778	98.48%	13,252,499	98.99%
Rejected Votes	837	1.31%	3,294	1.52%	135,452	1.01%
Total Polled	64,102	75.07%	216,072	76.59%	13,387,951	83.71%
Registered Electors	85,394		282,119		15,992,568	

=== 2015 Sri Lankan Presidential Election ===
Party	Mannar		Vanni Electoral District		Sri Lanka	
Party	Votes	%	Votes	%	Votes	%
NDF	45,543	85.13%	141,417	78.47%	6,217,162	51.28%
UPFA	6,824	12.76%	34,377	19.07%	5,768,090	47.58%
Other Parties (with < 1%)	1,133	2.12%	4,431	2.46%	138,200	1.14%
Valid Votes	53,500	98.35%	180,225	98.14%	12,123,452	98.85%
Rejected Votes	895	1.65%	3,416	1.86%	140,925	1.15%
Total Polled	54,395	68.48%	183,641	70.25%	12,264,377	78.69%
Registered Electors	79,433		261,422		15,585,942	

=== 2010 Sri Lankan Presidential Election ===
Party	Mannar		Vanni Electoral District		Sri Lanka	
Party	Votes	%	Votes	%	Votes	%
NDF	20,157	70.19%	70,367	66.86%	4,173,185	40.15%
UPFA	6,656	23.18%	28,740	27.31%	6,015,934	57.88%
Other Parties (with < 1%)	981	3.42%	4,124	3.92%	165,268	1.59%
DUNF	923	3.21%	2,021	1.92%	39,226	0.38%
Valid Votes	28,717	98.44%	105,252	97.75%	10,393,613	99.03%
Rejected Votes	455	1.56%	2,428	2.25%	101,838	0.97%
Total Polled	29,172	34.19%	107,680	19.60%	10,495,451	66.70%
Registered Electors	85,322		549,344		15,734,587	

=== 2005 Sri Lankan Presidential Election ===
Party	Mannar		Vanni Electoral District		Sri Lanka	
Party	Votes	%	Votes	%	Votes	%
UNP	20,463	88.72%	65,798	77.89%	4,706,366	48.43%
UPFA	2,183	9.46%	17,197	20.36%	4,887,152	50.29%
Other Parties (with < 1%)	419	1.82%	1,481	1.75%	123,521	1.27%
Valid Votes	23,065	98.46%	84,476	98.37%	9,717,039	98.88%
Rejected Votes	361	1.54%	1,398	1.63%	109,869	1.12%
Total Polled	23,426	29.69%	85,874	16.66%	9,826,908	69.51%
Registered Electors	78,906		515,573		14,136,979	

=== 1999 Sri Lankan Presidential Election ===
Party	Mannar		Vanni Electoral District		Sri Lanka	
Party	Votes	%	Votes	%	Votes	%
UNP	15,407	62.54%	43,803	69.87%	3,602,748	42.71%
PA	8,446	34.28%	16,202	25.84%	4,312,157	51.12%
Other Parties (with < 1%)	784	3.18%	2,685	4.28%	520,606	6.17%
Valid Votes	24,637	98.22%	62,690	97.68%	8,435,754	97.69%
Rejected Votes	446	1.78%	1,490	2.32%	199,536	2.31%
Total Polled	25,083	38.07%	64,180	31.13%	8,635,290	72.17%
Registered Electors	65,883		206,176		11,965,536	

=== 1994 Sri Lankan Presidential Election ===
Party	Mannar		Vanni Electoral District		Sri Lanka	
Party	Votes	%	Votes	%	Votes	%
PA	14,607	90.45%	33,585	85.30%	4,709,205	62.28%
UNP	981	6.07%	4,493	11.41%	2,715,283	35.91%
Ind 2	490	3.03%	1,003	2.55%	58,888	0.78%
Other Parties (with < 1%)	71	0.44%	291	0.74%	78,152	1.03%
Valid Votes	16,149	98.78%	39,372	98.30%	7,561,526	98.03%
Rejected Votes	199	1.22%	681	1.70%	151,706	1.97%
Total Polled	16,348	30.24%	40,053	22.27%	7,713,232	69.12%
Registered Electors	54,066		179,858		11,158,880	

=== 1988 Sri Lankan Presidential Election ===
Party	Mannar		Vanni Electoral District		Sri Lanka	
Party	Votes	%	Votes	%	Votes	%
UNP	4,500	64.60%	10,580	55.78%	2,569,199	50.43%
SLFP	1,431	20.54%	4,889	25.77%	2,289,857	44.95%
SLMP	1,035	14.86%	3,500	18.45%	235,701	4.63%
Valid Votes	6,966	97.91%	18,969	96.40%	5,094,754	98.24%
Rejected Votes	149	2.09%	708	3.60%	91,499	1.76%
Total Polled	7,115	15.12%	19,677	20.70%	5,186,256	55.87%
Registered Electors	47,060		95,061		9,283,143	

=== 1982 Sri Lankan Presidential Election ===
Party	Mannar		Vanni Electoral District		Sri Lanka	
Party	Votes	%	Votes	%	Votes	%
UNP	17,008	61.84%	32,834	46.42%	3,450,815	52.93%
SLFP	8,039	29.23%	23,221	32.83%	2,546,348	39.05%
ACTC	1,891	6.88%	11,521	16.29%	173,934	2.67%
Other Parties (with < 1%)	285	1.04%	877	1.24%	75,526	1.16%
JVP	279	1.01%	2,286	3.23%	273,428	4.19%
Valid Votes	27,502	98.26%	70,739	96.66%	6,520,156	98.78%
Rejected Votes	486	1.74%	2,447	3.34%	80,470	1.22%
Total Polled	27,988	68.32%	73,186	60.87%	6,600,626	80.15%
Registered Electors	40,965		120,235		8,235,358	

== Parliamentary Election Results ==
=== Summary ===
The winner of Mannar has matched the final country result 0 out of 7 times.

Year	Mannar	Vanni Electoral District	MAE %	Sri Lanka	MAE %
2015	ITAK	ITAK	3.78%	UNP	26.82%
2010	ITAK	ITAK	8.92%	UPFA	27.67%
2004	ITAK	ITAK	4.74%	UPFA	35.04%
2001	TULF	TULF	15.19%	UNP	29.97%
2000	TELO	TELO	7.28%	PA	33.43%
1994	SLMC	DPLF	6.23%	PA	37.41%
1989	TULF	TULF	4.39%	UNP	29.30%
Matches/Mean MAE	0/7	0/7	7.22%	7/7	31.38%

=== 2015 Sri Lankan Parliamentary Election ===
Party	Mannar		Vanni Electoral District		Sri Lanka	
Party	Votes	%	Votes	%	Votes	%
ITAK	27,096	58.34%	89,886	54.79%	515,963	4.63%
UNP	12,738	27.43%	39,513	24.09%	5,098,916	45.77%
SLMC	2,826	6.09%	5,716	3.48%	44,193	0.40%
UPFA	2,596	5.59%	20,965	12.78%	4,732,664	42.48%
Other Parties (with < 1%)	673	1.45%	5,951	3.63%	637,170	5.72%
PP	512	1.10%	2,022	1.23%	4,272	0.04%
Valid Votes	46,441	91.46%	164,053	90.17%	11,140,333	95.35%
Rejected Votes	4,206	8.28%	17,155	9.43%	516,926	4.42%
Total Polled	50,775	63.92%	181,930	71.89%	11,684,111	77.66%
Registered Electors	79,433		253,058		15,044,490	

=== 2010 Sri Lankan Parliamentary Election ===
Party	Mannar		Vanni Electoral District		Sri Lanka	
Party	Votes	%	Votes	%	Votes	%
ITAK	15,026	53.34%	41,673	39.02%	233,190	2.91%
UPFA	7,431	26.38%	37,522	35.13%	4,846,388	60.38%
UNP	3,125	11.09%	12,783	11.97%	2,357,057	29.37%
DPLF	982	3.49%	5,900	5.52%	6,036	0.08%
Other Parties (with < 1%)	873	3.10%	6,066	5.68%	505,487	6.30%
EPDP	731	2.60%	2,867	2.68%	2,867	0.04%
Valid Votes	28,168	92.78%	106,811	91.15%	8,026,322	96.03%
Rejected Votes	2,168	7.14%	10,208	8.71%	581,465	6.96%
Total Polled	30,359	35.58%	117,185	38.53%	8,358,246	59.29%
Registered Electors	85,322		304,111		14,097,690	

=== 2004 Sri Lankan Parliamentary Election ===
Party	Mannar		Vanni Electoral District		Sri Lanka	
Party	Votes	%	Votes	%	Votes	%
ITAK	25,631	80.47%	90,252	74.68%	633,203	6.85%
UNP	4,413	13.86%	16,213	13.42%	3,486,792	37.73%
DPLF	945	2.97%	6,028	4.99%	7,038	0.08%
EPDP	476	1.49%	1,084	0.90%	24,942	0.27%
Other Parties (with < 1%)	385	1.21%	7,271	6.02%	4,814,740	52.10%
Valid Votes	31,850	92.12%	120,848	92.59%	9,241,931	94.52%
Rejected Votes	2,726	7.88%	9,665	7.41%	534,452	5.47%
Total Polled	34,576	47.38%	130,513	57.60%	9,777,821	75.74%
Registered Electors	72,980		226,604		12,909,631	

=== 2001 Sri Lankan Parliamentary Election ===
Party	Mannar		Vanni Electoral District		Sri Lanka	
Party	Votes	%	Votes	%	Votes	%
TULF	15,906	66.33%	41,950	44.39%	348,164	3.89%
UNP	2,910	12.13%	26,575	28.12%	4,086,026	45.62%
EPDP	1,742	7.26%	3,404	3.60%	72,783	0.81%
PA	1,576	6.57%	7,831	8.29%	3,330,815	37.19%
DPLF	1,046	4.36%	9,614	10.17%	16,669	0.19%
IND1	487	2.03%	705	0.75%	2,263	0.03%
Other Parties (with < 1%)	314	1.31%	4,427	4.68%	943,815	10.54%
Valid Votes	23,981	93.08%	94,506	92.33%	8,955,844	94.77%
Rejected Votes	1,782	6.92%	7,855	7.67%	494,009	5.23%
Total Polled	25,763	36.36%	102,361	46.77%	9,449,878	76.03%
Registered Electors	70,850		218,861		12,428,762	

=== 2000 Sri Lankan Parliamentary Election ===
Party	Mannar		Vanni Electoral District		Sri Lanka	
Party	Votes	%	Votes	%	Votes	%
TELO	9,580	45.36%	21,423	32.03%	25,830	0.30%
NUA	1,821	8.62%	4,280	6.40%	185,593	2.16%
IG7	1,796	8.50%	2,325	3.48%	2,382	0.03%
UNP	1,695	8.02%	10,618	15.88%	3,451,765	40.12%
TULF	1,450	6.86%	4,610	6.89%	105,907	1.23%
IG4	1,440	6.82%	3,419	5.11%	5,792	0.07%
DPLF	1,200	5.68%	6,847	10.24%	20,655	0.24%
IG2	1,053	4.99%	1,235	1.85%	31,443	0.37%
Other Parties (with < 1%)	737	3.49%	5,795	8.67%	808,316	9.40%
PA	350	1.66%	6,323	9.45%	3,899,329	45.33%
Valid Votes	21,122	N/A	66,875	N/A	8,602,617	N/A

=== 1994 Sri Lankan Parliamentary Election ===
Party	Mannar		Vanni Electoral District		Sri Lanka	
Party	Votes	%	Votes	%	Votes	%
SLMC	5,785	32.73%	8,142	19.26%	143,307	1.80%
DPLF	4,403	24.91%	11,567	27.36%	11,567	0.15%
UNP	2,437	13.79%	7,850	18.57%	3,498,370	44.04%
EPRLF	1,841	10.41%	3,465	8.20%	9,411	0.12%
IND2	1,720	9.73%	1,880	4.45%	16,690	0.21%
TULF	1,127	6.38%	3,039	7.19%	132,461	1.67%
PA	207	1.17%	5,583	13.21%	3,887,805	48.94%
Other Parties (with < 1%)	157	0.89%	745	1.76%	50,636	0.64%
Valid Votes	17,677	94.11%	42,271	93.35%	7,943,688	95.20%
Rejected Votes	1,106	5.89%	3,009	6.65%	400,395	4.80%
Total Polled	18,783	34.74%	45,280	25.23%	8,344,095	74.75%
Registered Electors	54,066		179,435		11,163,064	

=== 1989 Sri Lankan Parliamentary Election ===
Party	Mannar		Vanni Electoral District		Sri Lanka	
Party	Votes	%	Votes	%	Votes	%
TULF	5,492	36.66%	17,271	39.99%	188,594	3.37%
SLMC	4,419	29.50%	7,945	18.40%	202,016	3.61%
UNP	2,507	16.73%	8,525	19.74%	2,838,005	50.71%
IND	2,472	16.50%	7,879	18.24%	12,285	0.22%
Other Parties (with < 1%)	91	0.61%	1,568	3.63%	1,785,369	31.90%
Valid Votes	14,981	92.01%	43,188	90.64%	5,596,468	93.87%
Rejected Votes	1,301	7.99%	4,462	9.36%	365,563	6.13%
Total Polled	16,282	34.65%	47,650	33.69%	5,962,031	63.60%
Registered Electors	46,990		141,448		9,374,164	

== Demographics ==
=== Ethnicity ===
The Mannar Polling Division has a Sri Lankan Tamil majority (80.4%) and a significant Moor population (16.5%) . In comparison, the Vanni Electoral District (which contains the Mannar Polling Division) has a Sri Lankan Tamil majority (82.5%)

Ethnicity in Mannar
1. Sri Lankan Tamil (80.4%)
2. Moor (16.5%)
3. Sinhalese (2.30%)
4. Other (0.70%)

=== Religion ===
The Mannar Polling Division has a Roman Catholic majority (52.6%), a significant Hindu population (24.1%) and a significant Muslim population (16.6%) . In comparison, the Vanni Electoral District (which contains the Mannar Polling Division) has a Hindu majority (58.5%) and a significant Roman Catholic population (21.1%)

Religion in Mannar
1. Roman Catholic (52.6%)
2. Hindu (24.1%)
3. Muslim (16.6%)
4. Other Christian (4.80%)
5. Buddhist (1.80%)
6. Other (0.00%)
