= V. Balachandran =

V. Balachandran may refer to:

- V. Balachandran (Indian politician)
- V. Balachandran (Sri Lankan politician)
