= S. Kanagaratnam =

Sri Lankan Tamil politician

Hon. S. Kanagaratnam MP
- ச. கனகரத்தினம்

Member of Parliament for Vanni District
- In office 2004–2010

Personal details
- Born: 28 December 1946 (age 79) Nallur, Ceylon
- Party: United People's Freedom Alliance
- Occupation: Driving instructor

Sathasivam Kanagaratnam (Tamil: சதாசிவம் கனகரத்தினம்; born 28 December 1946) is a Sri Lankan Tamil politician and former Member of Parliament.

== Early life and family ==
Kanagaratnam was born on 28 December 1946 Nallur, northern Ceylon. He was educated at Senkuntha Hindu College. He had two brothers (Chelvanayakam and Rajaratnam) and two sisters. Lieutinent Chelvanayakam (alias Amman, Chandran, Chellakili) was a member of the rebel Liberation Tigers of Tamil Eelam (LTTE) who was killed in the Thirunelvely ambush on the Sri Lankan military in July 1983.

Kanagaratnam has two sons (Aathithan and Shanseevan) and a daughter (Niruththana).

== Career ==
After school Kanagaratnam worked in various jobs including as a salesman and a chauffeur. He joined the Ceylon Transport Board in 1978 as a bus driver at the Mattakkuliya depot. He transferred to the Mullaitivu depot in 1980. After retirement in 2000 he worked part-time for the Vanni Private Bus Operators’ Association. He lived in Suthanthirapuram near Udayarkaddu in Mullaitivu District.

Kanagaratnam was selected by the rebel Liberation Tigers of Tamil Eelam (LTTE) to be one of the Tamil National Alliance's (TNA) candidates in Vanni District at the 2004 parliamentary election. He was elected and entered Parliament.

Kanagaratnam and his family were amongst the 300,000 civilians trapped in the No Fire Zone during the final months of the civil war. He disappeared after the end of the civil war in May 2009. He was picked by the police at the Menik Farm IDP camp and taken to Colombo. He had been detained on the orders of Defence Secretary Gotabhaya Rajapaksa for allegedly violating emergency regulations and assisting the LTTE. After eight months of detention Kanagaratnam was released in January 2010 in return for agreeing to support Mahinda Rajapaksa in the presidential election. He was provided with a newly built bungalow inside the Northern Province Governor’s residential complex in Vavuniya.

Kanagaratnam left the TNA and joined Rajapaksa's United People's Freedom Alliance (UPFA). He contested the 2010 parliamentary election as one of the UPFA's candidates in Vanni District but failed to get elected after coming sixth amongst the UPFA candidates.

== Electoral history ==
Electoral history of S. Kanagaratnam
Election	Constituency	Party	Votes	Result
2004 parliamentary	Vanni District	TNA	30,390	Elected
2010 parliamentary	Vanni District	UPFA	3,570	Not elected
