= D. Siddarthan =

Sri Lankan politician

Hon. D. Siddarthan MP
- த. சித்தார்த்தன் ධර්මලිංගම් සිද්ධාර්ථන්
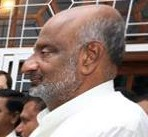
- Siddarthan in February 2017

Member of the Parliament of Sri Lanka
- Incumbent
- Assumed office 2015
- Constituency: Jaffna District
- In office 2001–2004
- Constituency: Vanni District
- In office 1994–2000
- Constituency: Vanni District

Member of the Northern Provincial Council
- In office 2013–2015
- Succeeded by: Kanapathippillai Tharumalingam
- Constituency: Jaffna District

Personal details
- Born: Dharmalingam Siddarthan; 10 September 1948 (age 77)
- Party: People's Liberation Organisation of Tamil Eelam
- Other political affiliations: Tamil National Alliance

Dharmalingam Siddarthan (Tamil: தர்மலிங்கம் சித்தார்த்தன், romanized: Tarmaliṅkam Cittārttaṉ; born 10 September 1948) is a Sri Lankan Tamil militant turned politician, former provincial councillor and Member of Parliament. He is the leader of the People's Liberation Organisation of Tamil Eelam, a member of the Tamil National Alliance.

== Early life ==
Siddarthan was born on 10 September 1948. He is the son of former MP V. Dharmalingam. Siddarthan became involved in Tamil nationalist politics in the 1960s but by the 1970s he had become involved in with militant groups. He was one of the founding members of the Tamil New Tigers and in 1977 founded the London branch of the Liberation Tigers of Tamil Eelam (LTTE). In 1980 LTTE chairman Uma Maheswaran split from the LTTE and founded the People's Liberation Organisation of Tamil Eelam (PLOTE). Siddarthan joined PLOTE. In 1982 Siddarthan, with the assistance of Eelam Revolutionary Organisation of Students, went to Syria to receive military training from Palestinian militant groups. Siddarthan took over leadership of the PLOTE following the assassination of Uma Maheswaran in 1989.

== Career ==
Siddarthan contested the 1989 parliamentary election as a Democratic People's Liberation Front's (DPLF) (the political wing of PLOTE) candidate in Jaffna District but the DPLF failed to win any seats in Parliament. He contested the 1994 parliamentary election as one of the DPLF's candidates in Vanni District and was elected to Parliament.

Siddarthan contested the 2000 parliamentary election as a DPLF candidate in Jaffna District but the DPLF failed to win any seats in Parliament. He contested the 2001 parliamentary election as one of the DPLF's candidates in Vanni District and was re-elected to Parliament. He contested the 2004 parliamentary election as a DPLF candidate in Vanni District but the DPLF failed to win any seats in Parliament. He contested the 2010 parliamentary election as a DPLF candidate in Vanni District but again the DPLF failed to win any seats in Parliament.

Following the end of the Sri Lankan Civil War in 2009 the Sri Lankan Tamil diaspora started exerting pressure on Sri Lankan Tamil political parties to unite and so PLOTE joined the Tamil National Alliance (TNA), the largest political group representing Sri Lankan Tamils. Siddarthan contested the 2013 provincial council election as one of the TNA's candidates in Jaffna District and was elected to the Northern Provincial Council. After the election he was appointed to assist the Chief Minister on vocational training, entrepreneurial development, small and medium enterprises. He took his oath as provincial councillor in front of PLOTE Secretary and All Island Justice Peace Subramanian Sathananthan at Chunnakam on 14 October 2013.

Siddarthan contested the 2015 parliamentary election as one of the TNA's candidates in Jaffna District and was re-elected to Parliament. He was re-elected at the 2020 parliamentary election.

== Electoral history ==
Electoral history of D. Siddarthan
Election	Constituency	Party	Alliance	Votes	Result
1989 parliamentary	Jaffna District	PLOTE	DPLF	1,731	Not elected
1994 parliamentary	Vanni District	PLOTE	DPLF	6,376	Elected
2000 parliamentary	Jaffna District	PLOTE	DPLF		Not elected
2001 parliamentary	Vanni District	PLOTE	DPLF	4,468	Elected
2004 parliamentary	Vanni District	PLOTE	DPLF	3,954	Not elected
2010 parliamentary	Vanni District	PLOTE	DPLF		Not elected
2013 provincial	Jaffna District	PLOTE	TNA	39,715	Elected
2015 parliamentary	Jaffna District	PLOTE	TNA	53,740	Elected
2020 parliamentary	Jaffna District	PLOTE	TNA	23,840	Elected
