= Noordeen Mashoor =

Sri Lankan politician

Hon. Noordeen Mashoor MP

Member of Parliament for Vanni District
- In office 2000–2004
- In office 2010–2010

Personal details
- Born: November 30, 1962
- Died: December 2, 2010 (aged 48) Colombo, Sri Lanka
- Party: Sri Lanka Muslim Congress
- Other political affiliations: United National Front

Noordeen Mashoor (Nurdeen Mashur) was a Sri Lankan politician and Member of Parliament.

Mashoor represented the Vanni multi-member electoral district in the Sri Lankan Parliament between October 2000 and April 2004, firstly for the National Unity Alliance then the United National Front (UNF).

Mashoor returned to Parliament in April 2010, this time representing Vanni for the UNF.

Mashoor died of a heart attack at a private hospital in Colombo on 2 December 2010.
