= R. Kuhaneswaran =

Sri Lankan Tamil politician

Hon. R. Kuhaneswaran MP

Member of Parliament for Vanni District
- In office 1989–1994
- In office 2000–2004

Personal details
- Born: 15 May 1960 (age 65)
- Party: Tamil Eelam Liberation Organization
- Other political affiliations: Tamil National Alliance

Raja Kuhaneswaran (born 15 May 1960; also known as Irasa Kuganeswaran) is a Sri Lankan Tamil politician and former Member of Parliament.

Kuhaneswaran was born on 15 May 1960. He is a Hindu.

Kuhaneswaran contested the 1989 parliamentary election as one of the Tamil Eelam Liberation Organization's candidates in Vanni District and was elected to Parliament. He was not re-elected at the 1994 parliamentary election.

Kuhaneswaran contested the 2000 parliamentary election and was re-elected. He was re-elected at the 2001 parliamentary election as a Tamil National Alliance candidate. He did not contest the 2004 parliamentary election after failing to get nominated.
