= Vanni Electoral District =

Electoral district in Sri Lanka

Vanni
- Electoral District for the Parliament of Sri Lanka
- Administrative District: Mannar; Mullaitivu; Vavuniya
- Province: Northern
- Polling divisions: 3
- Population: 363,509 (2011)
- Electorate: 253,058 (2014)

Current Electoral District
- Created: 1978
- Seats: 5 (1989–94); 6 (1994–present)
- MPs: NPP (2) Selvathambi Thilakanathan; Arumugam Jegadishwaran ITAK (1) Thurairasa Ravikumar SJB (1) Rishad Bathiudeen DTNA (1) A.Adaikkalanathan SLLP (1) K. Kader Masthan
- Provincial Council: Northern
- Created from: Mannar; Mullaitivu; Vavuniya

Vanni Electoral District (Tamil: வன்னி தேர்தல் மாவட்டம்) is one of the 22 multi-member electoral districts of Sri Lanka created by the 1978 Constitution of Sri Lanka. The district covers the administrative districts of Mannar, Mullaitivu and Vavuniya in the Northern province. The district currently elects 6 of the 225 members of the Sri Lankan Parliament and had 253,058 registered electors in 2014. The district is Sri Lanka's Electorate Number 11.

== Polling Divisions ==
The Vanni Electoral District consists of the following polling divisions:

A: Mannar

B: Vavuniya

C: Mullaitivu

== Election results ==
=== 1982 presidential election ===
Results of the 1st presidential election held on 20 October 1982:

| Candidate | Party | Votes per Polling Division | | | Postal Votes | Total Votes | % |
| Candidate | Party | Mannar | Mullaitivu | Vavuniya | Postal Votes | Total Votes | % |
|---|---|---|---|---|---|---|---|
| J. R. Jayewardene | UNP | 17,008 | 3,678 | 11,720 | 428 | 32,834 | 46.42% |
| Hector Kobbekaduwa | SLFP | 8,039 | 5,471 | 9,385 | 326 | 23,221 | 32.83% |
| Kumar Ponnambalam | ACTC | 1,891 | 6,654 | 2,689 | 287 | 11,521 | 16.29% |
| Rohana Wijeweera | JVP | 279 | 204 | 1,764 | 39 | 2,286 | 3.23% |
| Colvin R. de Silva | LSSP | 174 | 150 | 252 | 8 | 584 | 0.83% |
| Vasudeva Nanayakkara | NSSP | 111 | 84 | 87 | 11 | 293 | 0.41% |
| Valid Votes | | 27,502 | 16,241 | 25,897 | 1,099 | 70,739 | 100.00% |
| Rejected Votes | | 486 | 971 | 947 | 43 | 2,447 | |
| Total Polled | | 27,988 | 17,212 | 26,844 | 1,142 | 73,186 | |
| Registered Electors | | 40,965 | 34,472 | 43,656 | | 119,093 | |
| Turnout (%) | | 68.32% | 49.93% | 61.49% | | 61.45% | |

=== 1988 provincial council election ===
Results of the 1st North Eastern provincial council election held on 19 November 1988:

Mannar District - The Eelam People's Revolutionary Liberation Front won all 5 seats uncontested.

Mullaitivu District - The Eelam National Democratic Liberation Front won all 5 seats uncontested.

Vavuniya District - The Eelam National Democratic Liberation Front won all 4 seats uncontested.

=== 1988 presidential election ===
Results of the 2nd presidential election held on 19 December 1988:

| Candidate | Party | Votes per Polling Division | | | Total Votes | % |
| Candidate | Party | Mannar | Mullaitivu | Vavuniya | Total Votes | % |
|---|---|---|---|---|---|---|
| Ranasinghe Premadasa | UNP | 4,500 | 3,098 | 2,982 | 10,580 | 55.78% |
| Sirimavo Bandaranaike | SLFP | 1,431 | 1,639 | 1,819 | 4,889 | 25.77% |
| Ossie Abeygunasekera | SLPP | 1,035 | 1,119 | 1,346 | 3,500 | 18.45% |
| Valid Votes | | 6,966 | 5,856 | 6,147 | 18,969 | 100.00% |
| Rejected Votes | | 149 | 329 | 230 | 708 | |
| Total Polled | | 7,115 | 6,185 | 6,377 | 19,677 | |
| Registered Electors | | 47,060 | 41,624 | 54,039 | 142,723 | |
| Turnout (%) | | 15.12% | 14.86% | 11.80% | 13.79% | |

=== 1989 parliamentary general election ===
Results of the 9th parliamentary election held on 15 February 1989:

| Party | Votes per Polling Division | | | Postal Votes | Total Votes | % | Seats |
| Party | Mannar | Mullaitivu | Vavuniya | Postal Votes | Total Votes | % | Seats |
|---|---|---|---|---|---|---|---|
| Tamil United Liberation Front (ENDLF, EPRLF, TELO, TULF) | 5,492 | 2,937 | 8,750 | 92 | 17,271 | 39.99% | 2 |
| United National Party (CWC, UNP) | 2,507 | 426 | 5,423 | 169 | 8,525 | 19.74% | 1 |
| Sri Lanka Muslim Congress | 4,419 | 1,440 | 2,073 | 13 | 7,945 | 18.40% | 1 |
| Independent (EROS) | 2,472 | 2,882 | 2,479 | 46 | 7,879 | 18.24% | 1 |
| Sri Lanka Freedom Party | 91 | 37 | 1,398 | 42 | 1,568 | 3.63% | 0 |
| Valid Votes | 14,981 | 7,722 | 20,123 | 362 | 43,188 | 100.00% | 5 |
| Rejected Votes | 1,301 | 1,307 | 1,827 | 27 | 4,462 | | |
| Total Polled | 16,282 | 9,029 | 21,950 | 389 | 47,650 | | |
| Registered Electors | 46,990 | 40,224 | 53,733 | 501 | 141,448 | | |
| Turnout | 34.65% | 22.45% | 40.85% | 77.64% | 33.69% | | |

The following candidates were elected: A. E. Silva (EPRLF), 6,385 preference votes (pv); R. Kuhaneswaran (TELO), 6,276 pv; S. S. M. Abu Bakar (SLMC), 5,355 pv; Rasamanohari Pulendran (UNP), 3,260 pv; and Innasimuthu Alfred (EROS), 935 pv.

=== 1994 parliamentary general election ===
Results of the 10th parliamentary election held on 16 August 1994:

| Party | Votes per Polling Division | | | Postal Votes | Total Votes | % | Seats |
| Party | Mannar | Mullaitivu | Vavuniya | Postal Votes | Total Votes | % | Seats |
|---|---|---|---|---|---|---|---|
| Democratic People's Liberation Front (EROS, PLOTE, TELO) | 4,403 | 13 | 7,080 | 71 | 11,567 | 27.36% | 3 |
| Sri Lanka Muslim Congress | 5,785 | 906 | 1,412 | 39 | 8,142 | 19.26% | 1 |
| United National Party (CWC, UNP) | 2,437 | 799 | 4,497 | 117 | 7,850 | 18.57% | 1 |
| People's Alliance (SLFP et al.) | 207 | 342 | 4,869 | 165 | 5,583 | 13.21% | 1 |
| Eelam People's Revolutionary Liberation Front | 1,841 | 53 | 1,465 | 106 | 3,465 | 8.20% | 0 |
| Tamil United Liberation Front | 1,127 | 8 | 1,756 | 148 | 3,039 | 7.19% | 0 |
| Independent 2 | 1,720 | 82 | 66 | 12 | 1,880 | 4.45% | 0 |
| Independent 1 | 92 | 4 | 502 | 26 | 624 | 1.48% | 0 |
| Independent 3 | 49 | 2 | 24 | 2 | 77 | 0.18% | 0 |
| Nava Sama Samaja Party | 16 | 2 | 26 | 0 | 44 | 0.10% | 0 |
| Valid Votes | 17,677 | 2,211 | 21,697 | 686 | 42,271 | 100.00% | 6 |
| Rejected Votes | 1,106 | 125 | 1,766 | 12 | 3,009 | | |
| Total Polled | 18,783 | 2,336 | 23,463 | 698 | 45,280 | | |
| Registered Electors | 54,066 | 52,197 | 72,434 | | 178,697 | | |
| Turnout | 34.74% | 4.48% | 32.39% | | 25.34% | | |

The following candidates were elected: D. Siddarthan (DPLF-PLOTE), 6,376 preference votes (pv); S. Shanmuganathan (DPLF), 5,858 pv; V. Balachandran (DPLF), 4,515 pv; S. S. M. Abu Bakar (SLMC), 4,269 pv; Premaratnage Sumathipala (PA), 2,975 pv; and Rasamanohari Pulendran (UNP), 2,217 pv.

S. Shanmuganathan (DPLF) was killed on 15 July 1998.

=== 1994 presidential election ===
Results of the 3rd presidential election held on 9 November 1994:

| Candidate | Party | Votes per Polling Division | | | Postal Votes | Total Votes | % |
| Candidate | Party | Mannar | Mullaitivu | Vavuniya | Postal Votes | Total Votes | % |
|---|---|---|---|---|---|---|---|
| Chandrika Kumaratunga | PA | 14,607 | 1,128 | 16,861 | 989 | 33,585 | 85.30% |
| Srimathi Dissanayake | UNP | 981 | 330 | 3,026 | 156 | 4,493 | 11.41% |
| Hudson Samarasinghe | Ind 2 | 490 | 13 | 499 | 1 | 1,003 | 2.55% |
| G. A. Nihal | SLPF | 35 | 4 | 78 | 1 | 118 | 0.30% |
| Harischandra Wijayatunga | SMBP | 24 | 3 | 68 | 1 | 96 | 0.24% |
| A. J. Ranashinge | Ind 1 | 12 | 0 | 63 | 2 | 77 | 0.20% |
| Valid Votes | | 16,149 | 1,478 | 20,595 | 1,150 | 39,372 | 100.00% |
| Rejected Votes | | 199 | 27 | 444 | 11 | 681 | |
| Total Polled | | 16,348 | 1,505 | 21,039 | 1,161 | 40,053 | |
| Registered Electors | | 54,066 | 52,197 | 72,434 | 1,251 | 178,697 | |
| Turnout (%) | | 30.24% | 2.88% | 29.05% | 92.81% | 22.41% | |

=== 1999 presidential election ===
Results of the 4th presidential election held on 21 December 1999:

| Candidate | Party | Votes per Polling Division | | | Postal Votes | Total Votes | % |
| Candidate | Party | Mannar | Mullaitivu | Vavuniya | Postal Votes | Total Votes | % |
|---|---|---|---|---|---|---|---|
| Ranil Wickremasinghe | UNP | 15,407 | 389 | 27,621 | 386 | 43,803 | 69.87% |
| Chandrika Kumaratunga | PA | 8,446 | 751 | 6,845 | 160 | 16,202 | 25.84% |
| Nandana Gunathilake | JVP | 34 | 15 | 427 | 6 | 482 | 0.77% |
| Rajiva Wijesinha | Liberal | 128 | 1 | 326 | 1 | 456 | 0.73% |
| Vasudeva Nanayakkara | LDA | 120 | 4 | 293 | 27 | 444 | 0.71% |
| W. V. M. Ranjith | Ind 2 | 156 | 6 | 257 | 1 | 420 | 0.67% |
| Abdul Rasool | SLMP | 113 | 9 | 178 | 6 | 306 | 0.49% |
| T. Edirisuriya | Ind 1 | 91 | 1 | 142 | 0 | 234 | 0.37% |
| Harischandra Wijayatunga | SMBP | 35 | 2 | 55 | 1 | 93 | 0.15% |
| Kamal Karunadasa | PLSF | 39 | 2 | 42 | 0 | 83 | 0.13% |
| Hudson Samarasinghe | Ind 3 | 21 | 2 | 45 | 1 | 69 | 0.11% |
| A. W. Premawardhana | PFF | 31 | 0 | 27 | 0 | 58 | 0.09% |
| A. Dissanayaka | DUNF | 16 | 0 | 24 | 0 | 40 | 0.06% |
| Valid Votes | | 24,637 | 1,182 | 36,282 | 589 | 62,690 | 100.00% |
| Rejected Votes | | 446 | 30 | 968 | 46 | 1,490 | |
| Total Polled | | 25,083 | 1,212 | 37,250 | 635 | 64,180 | |
| Registered Electors | | 65,883 | 52,688 | 86,970 | | 205,541 | |
| Turnout (%) | | 38.07% | 2.30% | 42.83% | | 31.22% | |

=== 2000 parliamentary general election ===
Results of the 11th parliamentary election held on 10 October 2000:

| Party | Votes per Polling Division | | | Postal Votes | Displaced Votes | Total Votes | % | Seats |
| Party | Mannar | Mullaitivu | Vavuniya | Postal Votes | Displaced Votes | Total Votes | % | Seats |
|---|---|---|---|---|---|---|---|---|
| Tamil Eelam Liberation Organization | 9,580 | 0 | 11,325 | 518 | | 21,705 | 26.09% | 3 |
| National Unity Alliance (SLMC et al.) | 1,821 | 0 | 2,294 | 165 | | 15,837 | 19.04% | 1 |
| United National Party (DWC, NWC, UCPF, UNP) | 1,695 | 182 | 8,335 | 406 | | 11,545 | 13.88% | 1 |
| People's Alliance (SLFP et al.) | 350 | 439 | 5,110 | 424 | | 7,837 | 9.42% | 1 |
| Democratic People's Liberation Front (PLOTE) | 1,200 | 0 | 5,484 | 163 | | 6,961 | 8.37% | 0 |
| Tamil United Liberation Front | 1,450 | 0 | 2,709 | 451 | | 4,643 | 5.58% | 0 |
| Independent 4 | 1,440 | 0 | 1,937 | 42 | | 3,511 | 4.22% | 0 |
| Independent 2 | 1,053 | 1 | 83 | 98 | | 2,414 | 2.90% | 0 |
| Independent 7 | 1,796 | 0 | 496 | 33 | | 2,359 | 2.84% | 0 |
| Independent 5 | 15 | 0 | 1,518 | 37 | | 1,819 | 2.19% | 0 |
| Eelam People's Democratic Party | 157 | 0 | 1,129 | 31 | | 1,370 | 1.65% | 0 |
| Citizen's Front | 191 | 3 | 891 | 23 | | 1,233 | 1.48% | 0 |
| All Ceylon Tamil Congress | 139 | 0 | 522 | 56 | | 721 | 0.87% | 0 |
| Janatha Vimukthi Peramuna | 42 | 18 | 334 | 18 | | 444 | 0.53% | 0 |
| Ceylon Workers' Congress | 22 | 0 | 169 | 6 | | 225 | 0.27% | 0 |
| Sinhalaye Mahasammatha Bhoomiputra Pakshaya | 68 | 1 | 69 | 3 | | 144 | 0.17% | 0 |
| Independent 1 | 23 | 0 | 27 | 5 | | 132 | 0.16% | 0 |
| Sinhala Heritage | 18 | 3 | 79 | 1 | | 104 | 0.13% | 0 |
| Democratic United National Front | 34 | 1 | 38 | 0 | | 75 | 0.09% | 0 |
| Liberal Party | 3 | 4 | 31 | 0 | | 42 | 0.05% | 0 |
| Ruhuna People's Party | 12 | 0 | 19 | 0 | | 34 | 0.04% | 0 |
| Independent 3 | 8 | 0 | 11 | 0 | | 19 | 0.02% | 0 |
| Independent 6 | 5 | 0 | 11 | 0 | | 19 | 0.02% | 0 |
| Valid Votes | 21,122 | 652 | 42,621 | 2,480 | | 83,193 | 100.00% | 6 |
| Rejected Votes | 1,295 | | 3,856 | | | 6,604 | | |
| Total Polled | 22,417 | | 46,477 | | | 89,797 | | |
| Registered Electors | 68,468 | 53,054 | 91,589 | | | 213,111 | | |
| Turnout (%) | 32.74% | | 50.75% | | | 42.13% | | |

The following candidates were elected: Selvam Adaikalanathan (TELO), 15,490 preference votes (pv); Noordeen Mashoor (NUA), 12,283 pv; Vino Noharathalingam (TELO), 10,959 pv; R. Kuhaneswaran (TELO), 6,739 pv; Premaratnage Sumathipala (PA), 5,205 pv; and Santhakumara Punchihewa (UNP), 3,975 pv.

=== 2001 parliamentary general election ===
Results of the 12th parliamentary election held on 5 December 2001:

| Party | Votes per Polling Division | | | Postal Votes | Displaced Votes | Total Votes | % | Seats |
| Party | Mannar | Mullaitivu | Vavuniya | Postal Votes | Displaced Votes | Total Votes | % | Seats |
|---|---|---|---|---|---|---|---|---|
| Tamil National Alliance (ACTC, EPRLF(S), TELO, TULF) | 15,906 | 1 | 23,965 | 1,139 | 939 | 41,950 | 44.39% | 3 |
| United National Front (CWC, SLMC, UNP, WPF) | 2,910 | 237 | 7,069 | 564 | 15,795 | 26,575 | 28.12% | 2 |
| Democratic People's Liberation Front (PLOTE) | 1,046 | 0 | 8,316 | 99 | 153 | 9,614 | 10.17% | 1 |
| People's Alliance (NUA, SLFP et al.) | 1,576 | 298 | 4,119 | 779 | 1,059 | 7,831 | 8.29% | 0 |
| Eelam People's Democratic Party | 1,742 | 2 | 1,100 | 62 | 498 | 3,404 | 3.60% | 0 |
| Independent 7 | 59 | 0 | 2,645 | 48 | 58 | 2,810 | 2.97% | 0 |
| Independent 1 | 487 | 0 | 197 | 13 | 8 | 705 | 0.75% | 0 |
| Janatha Vimukthi Peramuna | 39 | 56 | 535 | 46 | 7 | 683 | 0.72% | 0 |
| New Left Front (NSSP et al.) | 124 | 5 | 137 | 15 | 43 | 324 | 0.34% | 0 |
| United Socialist Party | 39 | 1 | 79 | 1 | 122 | 242 | 0.26% | 0 |
| Sinhala Heritage | 18 | 0 | 61 | 1 | 9 | 89 | 0.09% | 0 |
| Independent 8 | 5 | 0 | 40 | 1 | 14 | 60 | 0.06% | 0 |
| United Lanka People's Party | 9 | 1 | 20 | 0 | 26 | 56 | 0.06% | 0 |
| Independent 6 | 2 | 1 | 42 | 0 | 8 | 53 | 0.06% | 0 |
| Independent 3 | 8 | 0 | 22 | 0 | 1 | 31 | 0.03% | 0 |
| Ruhuna People's Party | 7 | 0 | 17 | 0 | 2 | 26 | 0.03% | 0 |
| Independent 4 | 2 | 0 | 16 | 0 | 1 | 19 | 0.02% | 0 |
| Independent 2 | 1 | 0 | 9 | 1 | 6 | 17 | 0.02% | 0 |
| Independent 5 | 1 | 0 | 14 | 0 | 2 | 17 | 0.02% | 0 |
| Valid Votes | 23,981 | 602 | 48,403 | 2,769 | 18,751 | 94,506 | 100.00% | 6 |
| Rejected Votes | 1,782 | 28 | 4,635 | 82 | 1,328 | 7,855 | | |
| Total Polled | 25,763 | 630 | 53,038 | | | 102,361 | | |
| Registered Electors | 70,850 | 53,158 | 94,853 | | | 218,861 | | |
| Turnout (%) | 36.36% | 1.19% | 55.92% | | | 46.77% | | |

The following candidates were elected: Selvam Adaikalanathan (TNA-TELO), 28,548 preference votes (pv); R. Kuhaneswaran (TNA-TELO), 15,936 pv; Sivasakthy Ananthan (TNA-EPRLF), 14,023 pv; Noordeen Mashoor (UNF), 12,673 pv; Rishad Bathiudeen (UNF-SLMC), 9,276 pv; and D. Siddarthan (DPLF-PLOTE), 4,468 pv.

=== 2004 parliamentary general election ===
Results of the 13th parliamentary election held on 2 April 2004:

| Party | Votes per Polling Division | | | Postal Votes | Displaced Votes | Total Votes | % | Seats |
| Party | Mannar | Mullaitivu | Vavuniya | Postal Votes | Displaced Votes | Total Votes | % | Seats |
|---|---|---|---|---|---|---|---|---|
| Tamil National Alliance (ACTC, EPRLF(S), ITAK, TELO) | 25,631 | 27,667 | 35,012 | 1,942 | | 90,835 | 64.71% | 5 |
| United National Front (CWC, DPF, SLMC, UNP) | 4,413 | 277 | 10,724 | 799 | | 33,621 | 23.95% | 1 |
| United People's Freedom Alliance (JVP, NUA, SLFP et al.) | 179 | 391 | 4,713 | 1,132 | | 7,259 | 5.17% | 0 |
| Democratic People's Liberation Front (PLOTE) | 945 | 71 | 4,908 | 104 | | 6,316 | 4.50% | 0 |
| Eelam People's Democratic Party | 476 | 68 | 488 | 52 | | 1,097 | 0.78% | 0 |
| United Socialist Party | 92 | 7 | 158 | 1 | | 588 | 0.42% | 0 |
| Independent 9 | 43 | 60 | 113 | 1 | | 231 | 0.16% | 0 |
| Jathika Hela Urumaya | 2 | 3 | 58 | 10 | | 74 | 0.05% | 0 |
| Sinhalaye Mahasammatha Bhoomiputra Pakshaya | 17 | 2 | 37 | 1 | | 67 | 0.05% | 0 |
| New Left Front (NSSP et al.) | 6 | 4 | 44 | 3 | | 66 | 0.05% | 0 |
| Independent 5 | 0 | 0 | 57 | 0 | | 60 | 0.04% | 0 |
| Independent 3 | 22 | 3 | 22 | 0 | | 54 | 0.04% | 0 |
| Independent 1 | 7 | 4 | 13 | 0 | | 26 | 0.02% | 0 |
| Independent 6 | 4 | 4 | 10 | 0 | | 19 | 0.01% | 0 |
| Independent 8 | 3 | 1 | 12 | 0 | | 19 | 0.01% | 0 |
| Independent 2 | 2 | 5 | 9 | 0 | | 17 | 0.01% | 0 |
| Independent 4 | 2 | 0 | 5 | 0 | | 15 | 0.01% | 0 |
| Independent 7 | 2 | 0 | 2 | 0 | | 7 | 0.00% | 0 |
| Ruhuna People's Party | 4 | 0 | 1 | 0 | | 6 | 0.00% | 0 |
| Valid Votes | 31,850 | 28,567 | 56,386 | 4,045 | | 140,377 | 100.00% | 6 |
| Rejected Votes | 2,726 | 1,895 | 4,846 | 198 | | 10,626 | | |
| Total Polled | 34,576 | 30,462 | 61,232 | 4,243 | | 151,003 | | |
| Registered Electors | 72,980 | 53,439 | 100,185 | | | 226,604 | | |
| Turnout (%) | 47.38% | 57.00% | 61.12% | | | 66.64% | | |

The following candidates were elected: Selvam Adaikalanathan (TNA-TELO), 39,535 preference votes (pv); S. Kanagaratnam (TNA), 30,390 pv; Sivasakthy Ananthan (TNA-EPRLF), 29,801 pv; Vino Noharathalingam (TNA-TELO), 28,252 pv; Sivanathan Kisshor (TNA), 17,653 pv; and Rishad Bathiudeen (UNF-SLMC), 15,981 pv.

=== 2005 presidential election ===
Results of the 5th presidential election held on 17 November 2005:

| Candidate | Party | Votes per Polling Division | | | Postal Votes | Displaced Votes | Total Votes | % |
| Candidate | Party | Mannar | Mullaitivu | Vavuniya | Postal Votes | Displaced Votes | Total Votes | % |
|---|---|---|---|---|---|---|---|---|
| Ranil Wickremasinghe | UNP | 20,463 | 372 | 33,553 | 2,234 | 9,176 | 65,798 | 77.89% |
| Mahinda Rajapaksa | UPFA | 2,183 | 510 | 7,936 | 1,356 | 5,212 | 17,197 | 20.36% |
| Siritunga Jayasuriya | USP | 160 | 2 | 276 | 2 | 80 | 520 | 0.62% |
| A. A. Suraweera | NDF | 54 | 1 | 155 | 5 | 71 | 286 | 0.34% |
| Chamil Jayaneththi | NLF | 50 | 1 | 68 | 5 | 9 | 133 | 0.16% |
| Victor Hettigoda | ULPP | 21 | 1 | 62 | 21 | 10 | 115 | 0.14% |
| A. K. J. Arachchige | DUA | 44 | 0 | 37 | 1 | 25 | 107 | 0.13% |
| Aruna de Soyza | RPP | 18 | 2 | 37 | 2 | 12 | 71 | 0.08% |
| Wije Dias | SEP | 18 | 0 | 37 | 6 | 8 | 69 | 0.08% |
| Wimal Geeganage | SLNF | 21 | 1 | 40 | 4 | 2 | 68 | 0.08% |
| Anura De Silva | ULF | 21 | 1 | 33 | 1 | 6 | 62 | 0.07% |
| P. Nelson Perera | SLPF | 7 | 0 | 15 | 0 | 5 | 27 | 0.03% |
| H. S. Dharmadwaja | UNAF | 5 | 0 | 13 | 1 | 4 | 23 | 0.03% |
| Valid Votes | | 23,065 | 891 | 42,262 | 3,638 | 14,620 | 84,476 | 100.00% |
| Rejected Votes | | 361 | 11 | 766 | 79 | 181 | 1,398 | |
| Total Polled | | 23,426 | 902 | 43,028 | 3,717 | 14,801 | 85,874 | |
| Registered Electors | | 78,906 | 66,596 | 104,884 | | | 250,386 | |
| Turnout (%) | | 29.69% | 1.35% | 41.02% | | | 34.30% | |

=== 2010 presidential election ===
Results of the 6th presidential election held on 26 January 2010:

| Candidate | Party | Votes per Polling Division | | | Postal Votes | Displaced Votes | Total Votes | % |
| Candidate | Party | Mannar | Mullaitivu | Vavuniya | Postal Votes | Displaced Votes | Total Votes | % |
|---|---|---|---|---|---|---|---|---|
| Sarath Fonseka | NDF | 20,157 | 6,882 | 31,796 | 1,845 | 9,687 | 70,367 | 66.86% |
| Mahinda Rajapaksa | UPFA | 6,656 | 1,726 | 13,742 | 2,018 | 4,598 | 28,740 | 27.31% |
| M. C. M. Ismail | DUNF | 923 | 237 | 569 | 6 | 286 | 2,021 | 1.92% |
| C. J. Sugathsiri Gamage | UDF | 242 | 99 | 381 | 2 | 67 | 791 | 0.75% |
| M. K. Shivajilingam | Ind 5 | 105 | 41 | 308 | 40 | 55 | 549 | 0.52% |
| A. A. Suraweera | NDF | 73 | 28 | 183 | 9 | 50 | 343 | 0.33% |
| Sarath Manamendra | NSH | 74 | 53 | 127 | 0 | 40 | 294 | 0.28% |
| W. V. Mahiman Ranjith | Ind 1 | 65 | 35 | 125 | 6 | 48 | 279 | 0.27% |
| Lal Perera | ONF | 71 | 33 | 122 | 2 | 46 | 274 | 0.26% |
| A. S. P. Liyanage | SLLP | 44 | 43 | 104 | 4 | 32 | 227 | 0.22% |
| Vikramabahu Karunaratne | LF | 42 | 16 | 136 | 6 | 17 | 217 | 0.21% |
| Siritunga Jayasuriya | USP | 49 | 27 | 115 | 0 | 21 | 212 | 0.20% |
| Wije Dias | SEP | 45 | 12 | 58 | 2 | 16 | 133 | 0.13% |
| Sarath Kongahage | UNAF | 35 | 17 | 71 | 3 | 6 | 132 | 0.13% |
| Sanath Pinnaduwa | NA | 22 | 27 | 52 | 1 | 28 | 130 | 0.12% |
| Ukkubanda Wijekoon | Ind 3 | 28 | 10 | 68 | 1 | 8 | 115 | 0.11% |
| M. Mohamed Musthaffa | Ind 4 | 13 | 15 | 46 | 0 | 10 | 84 | 0.08% |
| Aithurus M. Illias | Ind 2 | 16 | 16 | 39 | 0 | 11 | 82 | 0.08% |
| Senaratna de Silva | PNF | 10 | 10 | 41 | 0 | 13 | 74 | 0.07% |
| Battaramulla Seelarathana | JP | 13 | 18 | 30 | 0 | 9 | 70 | 0.07% |
| Aruna de Soyza | RPP | 17 | 13 | 27 | 0 | 8 | 65 | 0.06% |
| M. B. Thaminimulla | ACAKO | 17 | 9 | 23 | 1 | 3 | 53 | 0.05% |
| Valid Votes | | 28,717 | 9,367 | 48,163 | 3,946 | 15,059 | 105,252 | 100.00% |
| Rejected Votes | | 455 | 258 | 1,335 | 45 | 335 | 2,428 | |
| Total Polled | | 29,172 | 9,625 | 49,498 | 3,991 | 15,394 | 107,680 | |
| Registered Electors | | 85,322 | 68,729 | 112,924 | | | 266,975 | |
| Turnout | | 34.19% | 14.00% | 43.83% | | | 40.33% | |

=== 2010 parliamentary general election ===
Results of the 14th parliamentary election held on 8 April 2010:

| Party | Votes per Polling Division | | | Postal Votes | Displaced Votes | Total Votes | % | Seats |
| Party | Mannar | Mullaitivu | Vavuniya | Postal Votes | Displaced Votes | Total Votes | % | Seats |
|---|---|---|---|---|---|---|---|---|
| Tamil National Alliance (EPRLF(S), ITAK, TELO) | 15,026 | 5,241 | 17,372 | 1,507 | 2,527 | 41,673 | 38.96% | 3 |
| United People's Freedom Alliance (ACMC, SLFP et al.) | 7,431 | 2,238 | 13,714 | 2,128 | 12,011 | 37,522 | 35.07% | 2 |
| United National Front (DPF, SLFP(P), SLMC, UNP) | 3,125 | 169 | 3,638 | 354 | 5,497 | 12,783 | 11.95% | 1 |
| Democratic People's Liberation Front (PLOTE) | 982 | 527 | 4,200 | 111 | 80 | 5,900 | 5.52% | 0 |
| Eelam People's Democratic Party | 731 | 593 | 1,405 | 53 | 85 | 2,867 | 2.68% | 0 |
| Independent 1 | 202 | 131 | 1,569 | 45 | 26 | 1,973 | 1.84% | 0 |
| Eelavar Democratic Front (EROS) | 89 | 393 | 797 | 27 | 88 | 1,394 | 1.30% | 0 |
| Tamil United Liberation Front | 241 | 124 | 625 | 71 | 12 | 1,073 | 1.00% | 0 |
| Democratic Unity Alliance | 229 | 114 | 92 | 32 | 39 | 506 | 0.47% | 0 |
| Democratic National Alliance (JVP et al.) | 15 | 20 | 230 | 34 | 2 | 301 | 0.28% | 0 |
| Independent 9 | 7 | 145 | 64 | 4 | 42 | 262 | 0.24% | 0 |
| Independent 10 | 19 | 6 | 114 | 5 | 3 | 147 | 0.14% | 0 |
| Our National Front | 28 | 9 | 39 | 1 | 9 | 86 | 0.08% | 0 |
| National Development Front | 10 | 7 | 31 | 0 | 19 | 67 | 0.06% | 0 |
| Independent 7 | 17 | 0 | 21 | 0 | 24 | 62 | 0.06% | 0 |
| Sinhalaye Mahasammatha Bhoomiputra Pakshaya | 4 | 8 | 45 | 1 | 0 | 58 | 0.05% | 0 |
| Janasetha Peramuna | 1 | 4 | 41 | 0 | 1 | 47 | 0.04% | 0 |
| Independent 8 | 0 | 4 | 32 | 0 | 1 | 37 | 0.03% | 0 |
| Independent 2 | 4 | 3 | 25 | 1 | 3 | 36 | 0.03% | 0 |
| Independent 5 | 6 | 0 | 13 | 0 | 13 | 32 | 0.03% | 0 |
| Independent 6 | 8 | 2 | 17 | 1 | 3 | 31 | 0.03% | 0 |
| Sri Lanka National Front | 0 | 4 | 22 | 1 | 2 | 29 | 0.03% | 0 |
| Tamil Makkal Viduthalai Pulikal | 7 | 5 | 12 | 0 | 1 | 25 | 0.02% | 0 |
| Independent 12 | 4 | 2 | 11 | 0 | 2 | 19 | 0.02% | 0 |
| Independent 4 | 2 | 0 | 13 | 0 | 1 | 16 | 0.01% | 0 |
| Left Liberation Front (LLF, TNLA) | 1 | 1 | 10 | 0 | 1 | 13 | 0.01% | 0 |
| Independent 3 | 0 | 2 | 9 | 0 | 1 | 12 | 0.01% | 0 |
| Independent 11 | 2 | 0 | 4 | 0 | 0 | 6 | 0.01% | 0 |
| Valid Votes | 28,191 | 9,752 | 44,165 | 4,376 | 20,493 | 106,977 | 100.00% | 6 |
| Rejected Votes | 2,168 | 1,610 | 4,481 | 185 | 1,764 | 10,208 | | |
| Total Polled | 30,359 | 11,362 | 48,646 | 4,561 | 22,257 | 117,185 | | |
| Registered Electors | 85,322 | 68,729 | 112,924 | | | 266,975 | | |
| Turnout | 35.58% | 16.53% | 43.08% | | | 43.89% | | |

The following candidates were elected: Rishad Bathiudeen (UPFA-ACMC), 27,461 preference votes (pv); Selvam Adaikalanathan (TNA-TELO), 17,366 pv; Vino Noharathalingam (TNA-TELO), 12,120 pv; Sivasakthy Ananthan (TNA-EPRLF), 11,674 pv; Hunais Farook (UPFA-ACMC), 10,851 pv; and Noordeen Mashoor (UNF-SLMC), 9,518 pv.

Noordeen Mashoor (UPFA-SLMC) died on 2 December 2010. His replacement Muthali Bawa Farook (UPFA-SLMC) was sworn in on 5 January 2011.

=== 2013 provincial council election ===
Results of the 1st Northern provincial council election held on 21 September 2013:

Mannar District

| Party | Mannar | Postal Votes | Total Votes | % | Seats |
|---|---|---|---|---|---|
| Tamil National Alliance (EPRLF (S), ITAK, PLOTE, TELO, TULF) | 31,818 | 1,300 | 33,118 | 62.22% | 3 |
| United People's Freedom Alliance (ACMC, EPDP, SLFP et al.) | 14,696 | 408 | 15,104 | 28.38% | 1 |
| Sri Lanka Muslim Congress | 4,436 | 135 | 4,571 | 8.59% | 1 |
| United National Party | 180 | 7 | 187 | 0.35% | 0 |
| Our National Front | 87 | 0 | 87 | 0.16% | 0 |
| Democratic Unity Alliance | 69 | 1 | 70 | 0.13% | 0 |
| Independent 6 | 12 | 1 | 13 | 0.02% | 0 |
| Independent 8 | 13 | 0 | 13 | 0.02% | 0 |
| Democratic Party | 11 | 0 | 11 | 0.02% | 0 |
| Janatha Vimukthi Peramuna | 11 | 0 | 11 | 0.02% | 0 |
| Janasetha Peramuna | 7 | 0 | 7 | 0.01% | 0 |
| Sri Lanka Labour Party | 7 | 0 | 7 | 0.01% | 0 |
| Independent 5 | 6 | 0 | 6 | 0.01% | 0 |
| Independent 4 | 5 | 0 | 5 | 0.01% | 0 |
| Independent 7 | 5 | 0 | 5 | 0.01% | 0 |
| Independent 1 | 3 | 0 | 3 | 0.01% | 0 |
| Independent 3 | 3 | 0 | 3 | 0.01% | 0 |
| Muslim Liberation Front | 3 | 0 | 3 | 0.01% | 0 |
| Independent 2 | 1 | 0 | 1 | 0.00% | 0 |
| United Lanka Great Council | 1 | 0 | 1 | 0.00% | 0 |
| Valid Votes | 51,374 | 1,852 | 53,226 | 100.00% | 5 |
| Rejected Votes | 2,972 | 17 | 2,989 | | |
| Total Polled | 54,346 | 1,869 | 56,215 | | |
| Registered Electors | 75,737 | | 75,737 | | |
| Turnout | 71.76% | | 74.22% | | |

Mullaitivu District

| Party | Mullaitivu | Postal Votes | Total Votes | % | Seats |
|---|---|---|---|---|---|
| Tamil National Alliance (EPRLF (S), ITAK, PLOTE, TELO, TULF) | 27,620 | 646 | 28,266 | 78.56% | 4 |
| United People's Freedom Alliance (ACMC, EPDP, SLFP et al.) | 7,063 | 146 | 7,209 | 20.04% | 1 |
| Sri Lanka Muslim Congress | 199 | 0 | 199 | 0.55% | 0 |
| United National Party | 195 | 2 | 197 | 0.55% | 0 |
| Independent 1 | 44 | 0 | 44 | 0.12% | 0 |
| Janatha Vimukthi Peramuna | 30 | 0 | 30 | 0.08% | 0 |
| Independent 2 | 10 | 0 | 10 | 0.03% | 0 |
| Nationalities Unity Organisation | 10 | 0 | 10 | 0.03% | 0 |
| United Lanka Great Council | 6 | 0 | 6 | 0.02% | 0 |
| Janasetha Peramuna | 5 | 0 | 5 | 0.01% | 0 |
| Democratic Party | 1 | 1 | 2 | 0.01% | 0 |
| Sri Lanka Labour Party | 2 | 0 | 2 | 0.01% | 0 |
| United Lanka People's Party | 2 | 0 | 2 | 0.01% | 0 |
| Valid Votes | 35,187 | 795 | 35,982 | 100.00% | 5 |
| Rejected Votes | 2,815 | 5 | 2,820 | | |
| Total Polled | 38,002 | 800 | 38,802 | | |
| Registered Electors | 53,683 | | 53,683 | | |
| Turnout | 70.79% | | 72.28% | | |

Vavuniya District

| Party | Vavuniya | Postal Votes | Total Votes | % | Seats |
|---|---|---|---|---|---|
| Tamil National Alliance (EPRLF (S), ITAK, PLOTE, TELO, TULF) | 40,324 | 901 | 41,225 | 66.10% | 4 |
| United People's Freedom Alliance (ACMC, EPDP, SLFP et al.) | 16,310 | 323 | 16,633 | 26.67% | 2 |
| Sri Lanka Muslim Congress | 1,967 | 24 | 1,991 | 3.19% | 0 |
| United National Party | 1,704 | 65 | 1,769 | 2.84% | 0 |
| Janatha Vimukthi Peramuna | 158 | 15 | 173 | 0.28% | 0 |
| Democratic Unity Alliance | 170 | 0 | 170 | 0.27% | 0 |
| Independent 6 | 155 | 5 | 160 | 0.26% | 0 |
| Independent 3 | 45 | 0 | 45 | 0.07% | 0 |
| Democratic Party | 29 | 12 | 41 | 0.07% | 0 |
| Independent 5 | 34 | 0 | 34 | 0.05% | 0 |
| Independent 1 | 32 | 0 | 32 | 0.05% | 0 |
| Independent 4 | 26 | 0 | 26 | 0.04% | 0 |
| United Socialist Party | 23 | 0 | 23 | 0.04% | 0 |
| Independent 7 | 21 | 1 | 22 | 0.04% | 0 |
| Independent 2 | 8 | 0 | 8 | 0.01% | 0 |
| United Lanka People's Party | 6 | 0 | 6 | 0.01% | 0 |
| Sri Lanka Labour Party | 3 | 0 | 3 | 0.00% | 0 |
| Janasetha Peramuna | 2 | 0 | 2 | 0.00% | 0 |
| United Lanka Great Council | 2 | 0 | 2 | 0.00% | 0 |
| Valid Votes | 61,019 | 1,346 | 62,365 | 100.00% | 6 |
| Rejected Votes | 4,391 | 25 | 4,416 | | |
| Total Polled | 65,410 | 1,371 | 66,781 | | |
| Registered Electors | 94,644 | | 94,644 | | |
| Turnout | 69.11% | | 70.56% | | |

=== 2015 presidential election ===
Results of the 7th presidential election held on 8 January 2015:

| Candidate | Party | Votes per Polling Division | | | Postal Votes | Total Votes | % |
| Candidate | Party | Mannar | Mullaitivu | Vavuniya | Postal Votes | Total Votes | % |
|---|---|---|---|---|---|---|---|
| Maithripala Sirisena | NDF | 45,543 | 35,441 | 55,683 | 4,750 | 141,417 | 78.47% |
| Mahinda Rajapaksa | UPFA | 6,824 | 7,935 | 16,678 | 2,940 | 34,377 | 19.07% |
| A. S. P. Liyanage | SLLP | 159 | 195 | 213 | 7 | 574 | 0.32% |
| Maulawi Ibrahim Mohanmed Mishlar | UPF | 160 | 185 | 212 | 6 | 563 | 0.31% |
| Ruwanthileke Peduru | ULPP | 136 | 151 | 164 | 2 | 453 | 0.25% |
| Namal Ajith Rajapaksa | ONF | 74 | 176 | 143 | 7 | 400 | 0.22% |
| Ratnayake Arachchige Sirisena | PNF | 68 | 135 | 148 | 7 | 358 | 0.20% |
| Aithurus M. Illias | Ind | 78 | 124 | 146 | 8 | 356 | 0.20% |
| Siritunga Jayasuriya | USP | 100 | 67 | 128 | 5 | 300 | 0.17% |
| Sarath Manamendra | NSH | 61 | 81 | 91 | 2 | 235 | 0.13% |
| Sundaram Mahendran | NSSP | 46 | 69 | 91 | 12 | 218 | 0.12% |
| Pani Wijesiriwardene | SEP | 57 | 78 | 78 | 3 | 216 | 0.12% |
| Duminda Nagamuwa | FSP | 44 | 68 | 74 | 5 | 191 | 0.11% |
| Muthu Bandara Theminimulla | AACAAK | 32 | 44 | 57 | 0 | 133 | 0.07% |
| Anurudha Polgampola | Ind | 32 | 29 | 53 | 0 | 114 | 0.06% |
| Prasanna Priyankara | DNM | 29 | 37 | 45 | 2 | 113 | 0.06% |
| Battaramulle Seelarathana | JSP | 23 | 19 | 30 | 0 | 72 | 0.04% |
| Wimal Geeganage | SLNF | 19 | 23 | 26 | 0 | 68 | 0.04% |
| Jayantha Kulathunga | ULGC | 15 | 32 | 20 | 0 | 67 | 0.04% |
| Valid Votes | | 53,500 | 44,889 | 74,080 | 7,756 | 180,225 | 100.00% |
| Rejected Votes | | 895 | 1,052 | 1,371 | 98 | 3,416 | |
| Total Polled | | 54,395 | 45,941 | 75,451 | 7,854 | 183,641 | |
| Registered Electors | | 79,433 | 63,920 | 109,705 | | 253,058 | |
| Turnout | | 68.48% | 71.87% | 68.78% | | 72.57% | |
