= Vino Noharathalingam =

Sri Lankan Tamil politician and Member of Parliament

Hon. Vino Noharathalingam MP
- வினோ நோகராதலிங்கம் සුබ්‍රමනියම් නොකාරතලිංගම්

Member of the Parliament of Sri Lanka
- Incumbent
- Assumed office 2020
- Constituency: Vanni District
- In office 2004–2015
- Constituency: Vanni District
- In office 2000–2001
- Constituency: Vanni District

Personal details
- Born: Subramanyam Noharathalingam; 7 June 1963 (age 62)
- Party: Tamil Eelam Liberation Organization
- Other political affiliations: Tamil National Alliance

Subramanyam Noharathalingam (Tamil: சுப்பிரமணியம் நோகராதலிங்கம், romanized: Cuppiramaṇiyam Nōkarātaliṅkam; born 7 June 1963), commonly known as Vino Noharathalingam, is a Sri Lankan Tamil politician and Member of Parliament.

== Early life ==
Noharathalingam was born on 7 June 1963.

== Career ==
Noharathalingam contested the 2000 parliamentary election as one of the Tamil Eelam Liberation Organization (TELO)'s candidates in Vanni District and was elected to the Parliament. On 20 October 2001 the All Ceylon Tamil Congress, Eelam People's Revolutionary Liberation Front, TELO and Tamil United Liberation Front formed the Tamil National Alliance (TNA). Noharathalingam contested the 2001 parliamentary election as one of the TNA's candidates in Vanni District but failed to get re-elected.

Noharathalingam contested the 2004 parliamentary election as one of the TNA's candidates in Vanni District and was re-elected to Parliament. He was re-elected at the 2010 parliamentary election. He contested the 2015 parliamentary election as one of the TNA's candidates in Vanni District but failed to get elected after coming 6th amongst the TNA candidates.

Noharathalingam contested the 2020 parliamentary election as a TNA candidate in Vanni District and was re-elected to Parliament.

== Electoral history ==
Electoral history of Vino Noharathalingam
| Election | Constituency | Party | Alliance | Votes | Result |
|---|---|---|---|---|---|
| 2000 parliamentary | Vanni District | Tamil Eelam Liberation Organization | | 10,959 | Elected |
| 2001 parliamentary | Vanni District | Tamil Eelam Liberation Organization | Tamil National Alliance | | Not elected |
| 2004 parliamentary | Vanni District | Tamil Eelam Liberation Organization | Tamil National Alliance | 28,252 | Elected |
| 2010 parliamentary | Vanni District | Tamil Eelam Liberation Organization | Tamil National Alliance | 12,120 | Elected |
| 2015 parliamentary | Vanni District | Tamil Eelam Liberation Organization | Tamil National Alliance | 17,721 | Not elected |
| 2020 parliamentary | Vanni District | Tamil Eelam Liberation Organization | Tamil National Alliance | 15,180 | Elected |
