= Rasamanohari Pulendran =

Sri Lankan politician (1949–2014)

Hon. Rasamanohari Pulendran MP
- இராசமனோகரி புலேந்திரன்

Minister of State for Education

Member of Parliament for Vanni District
- In office 1989–2000

Personal details
- Born: 7 February 1949
- Died: 30 December 2014 (aged 65) Colombo, Sri Lanka
- Party: United National Party

Rasamanohari Pulendran (Tamil: இராசமனோகரி புலேந்திரன்; 7 February 1949 – 30 December 2014) was a Sri Lankan Tamil politician, Member of Parliament and state minister.

== Early life and family ==
Pulendran was born 7 February 1949. She was the daughter of T. S. Thurairajah, Mayor of Jaffna, and Nageswari. She was educated at Holy Family Convent, Jaffna.

Pulendran married K. T. Pulendran, the United National Party (UNP) organiser for Vavuniya District and a member of Vavuniya Urban Council. They had two daughters (Abirami and Durga). Her husband was assassinated on 19 January 1983, allegedly by the militant Liberation Tigers of Tamil Eelam.

== Career ==
Pulendran contested the 1989 parliamentary election as one of the UNP's candidates in Vanni District. She was elected and entered Parliament. In March 1990 she was appointed Minister of State for Education. She was re-elected at the 1994 parliamentary election.

Pulendran was a member of the UNP's executive committee, women's league and Vavuniya District organiser. She was a director of the Mineral Sands Corporation, patron of the All Ceylon Hindu Congress and a committee member of The Young Hindu Women’s Association.

Pulendran died on 30 December 2014 at a private hospital in Colombo.
