= A. E. Silva =

Sri Lankan Tamil politician

Hon. A. E. Silva

Member of Parliament for Vanni District
- In office 1989–1994

Personal details
- Died: 14 September 2002
- Party: Eelam People's Democratic Party

Anthony Emmanuel Silva (died 14 September 2002) was a Sri Lankan Tamil politician and Member of Parliament.

Silva contested the 1989 parliamentary election as one of the Eelam People's Revolutionary Liberation Front's candidates in Vanni District and was elected to Parliament. He later defected to the paramilitary Eelam People's Democratic Party. He contested the 2001 parliamentary election as an EPDP candidate in Vanni District but was not elected.

Silva was burnt to death at his house on 14 September 2002 under mysterious circumstances.
