= Arumugam Jegadishwaran =

Sri Lankan politician

Arumugam Jegadishwaran is a Sri Lankan Tamil politician. He was elected to the Sri Lankan Parliament from Vanni Electoral District as a member of the National People's Power.
