= K. Kader Masthan =

Sri Lankan politician

Hon. K. Kader Masthan MP
- காதர் மஸ்தான் කාදර් මස්තාන්

Minister of State for Rural Economy (Note: Minister of State for Rural Economic Crop Cultivation & Promotion from 18 April 2022 to 9 May 2022.)
- In office 18 April 2022 – 24 September 2024

Deputy Minister of Resettlement, Rehabilitation and Northern Development
- In office 12 June 2018 – 15 December 2018

Member of Parliament for Vanni District
- Incumbent
- Assumed office 1 September 2015

Personal details
- Born: January 11, 1971 (age 55)
- Party: Sri Lanka Labour Party (since 2024); Sri Lanka Freedom Party (Before 2022)
- Other political affiliations: Sri Lanka People's Freedom Alliance (2019–2022); United People's Freedom Alliance (Before 2019)

K. Kader Masthan is a Sri Lankan politician and member of parliament from the Vanni Electoral District. He is also the former State Minister of Rural Economy.
