= V. Balachandran (Sri Lankan politician) =

Sri Lankan Tamil politician

Hon. V. Balachandran MP

Member of Parliament for Vanni District
- In office 1994–2000

Personal details
- Born: 18 December 1951 (age 74)
- Party: Democratic People's Liberation Front
- Other political affiliations: People's Liberation Organisation of Tamil Eelam
- Ethnicity: Sri Lankan Tamil

Vaithilingam Balachandran (born 18 December 1951) is a Sri Lankan Tamil politician and former member of parliament.

Balachandran was born on 18 December 1951. He is a Hindu.

Balachandran contested the 1994 parliamentary election as one of the Democratic People's Liberation Front's candidates in Vanni District and was elected to Parliament. He contested the 2001 and 2010 parliamentary elections as a DPLF candidate in Vanni District but failed to get elected on each occasion.
