= Sri Lanka Labour Party =

Political party in Sri Lanka

Sri Lanka Labour Party ශ්‍රී ලංකා කම්කරු පක්ෂය ஸ்ரீலங்கா தொழிலாளர் கட்சி
- Leader: A. S. P. Liyanage
- President: Philip Terrance
- General Secretary: P. D. K. K. P. Liyanage
- Founded: 16 May 1998 (27 years ago)
- Parliament: 1 / 225
- Provincial Councils: 0 / 455
- Local Government: 26 / 7,842

Election symbol
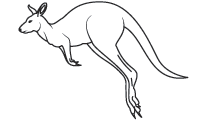
- Kangaroo

The Sri Lanka Labour Party (SLLP; Sinhala: ශ්‍රී ලංකා කම්කරු පක්ෂය) is a political party led by A. S. P. Liyanage. The secretary is Ms. P. D. K. K. P. Liyanage. The official electoral symbol is a kangaroo. The party had no parliamentary representation until 2024, when K. Kader Masthan, a former member of the Sri Lanka Podujana Peramuna, was elected to parliament from the Vanni District as a candidate of the party.
