= New Sinhala Heritage =

- Leader: Sarath Manamendra
- Founder: Sarath Manamendra
- Founded: 2006

Election symbol
- Bow & Arrow

New Sinhala Heritage (Sinhala: Nava Sihala Urumaya) is a Sri Lankan political party founded in 2006 by former United National Party member Sarath Manamendra. The party became a member of the UNP-led United National Front in November 2009.

In the January 2010 presidential election party leader Manamendra stood as the party's candidate getting 0.09% of votes. The party contested the April 2010 general election as a part of the Democratic National Alliance led by General Sarath Fonseka. New Sinhala Heritage got no seats. It was expelled from the DNA in November 2010.
