= 2010 Sri Lankan presidential election =

- 26 January 2010
- Turnout: 74.50% (▲0.77pp)
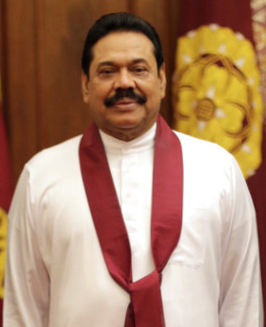

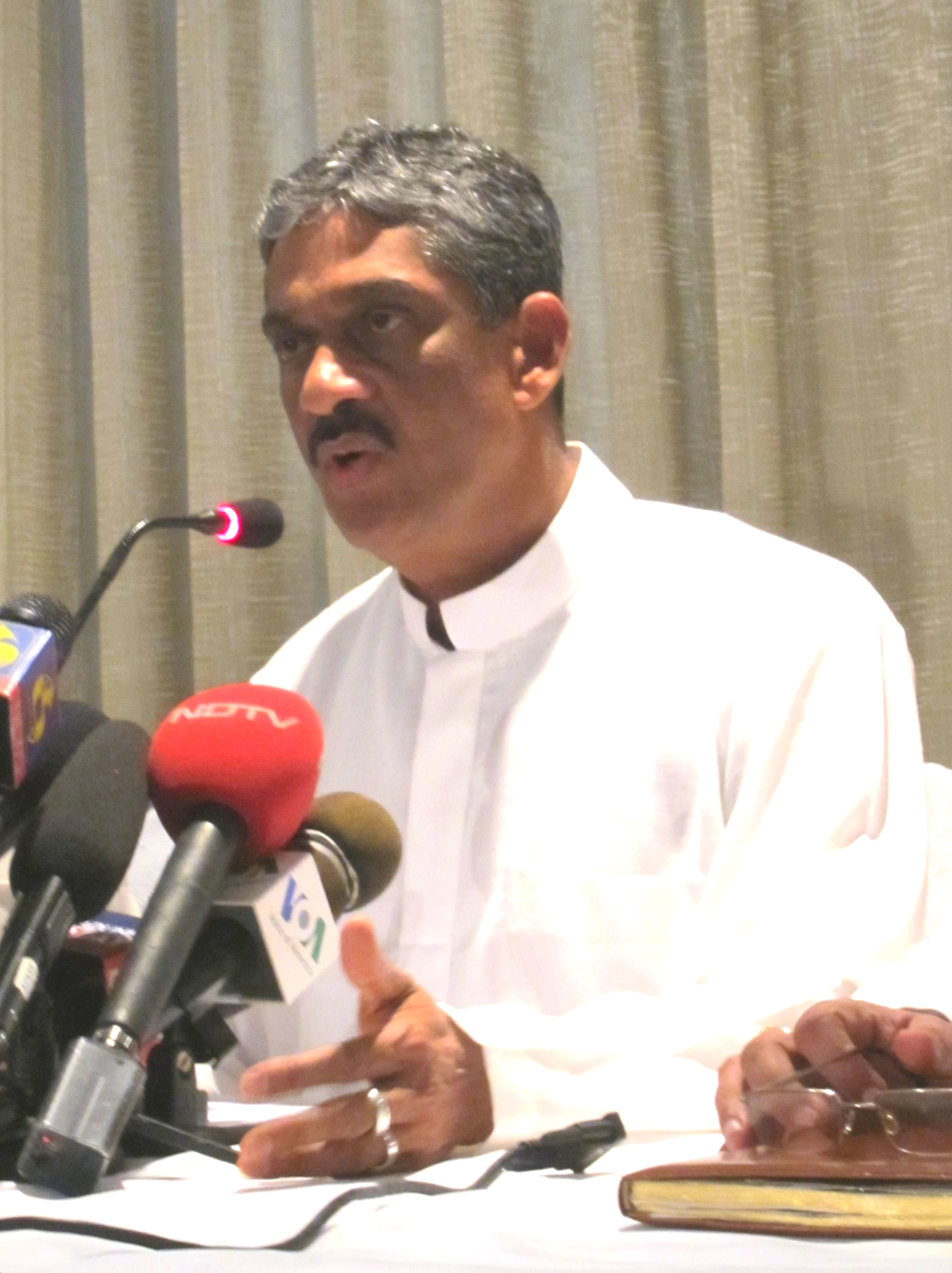
Nominee	Mahinda Rajapaksa	Sarath Fonseka
Party	SLFP	NDF
Alliance	UPFA	–
Popular vote	6,015,934	4,173,185
Percentage	57.88%	40.15%
- Results by polling division Mahinda Rajapaksa Sarath Fonseka
President before election
Mahinda Rajapaksa
SLFP
Elected President
Mahinda Rajapaksa
SLFP

Presidential elections were held in Sri Lanka on 26 January 2010. They were the sixth presidential elections held in the country's history, and the first to be held following the conclusion of the Sri Lankan civil war. Incumbent president Mahinda Rajapaksa of the governing United People's Freedom Alliance was re-elected with 57.88% of the vote, defeating his main opponent Sarath Fonseka of the New Democratic Front, an opposition coalition backed by the United National Party. Fonseka received 40.15% of the vote, carrying the formerly LTTE-occupied Northern and Eastern Provinces. The remaining twenty candidates each garnered less than 0.5% of the popular vote.

The elections were announced on 23 November 2009 when president Rajapaksa decided to seek a fresh mandate prior to the expiration of his term in 2011. Nominations were accepted on 17 December 2009.

== Background ==
In 2005, Mahinda Rajapaksa was elected to his first 6-year term as president, defeating opposition leader Ranil Wickremesinghe, the United National Party (UNP) candidate. Prior to the election, Mahinda Rajapaksa served as prime minister under president Chandrika Kumaratunga from 2004 to 2005. Rajapaksa won a narrow victory, winning 50.29% of the popular vote, and beating Wickremesinghe by a margin of a little more than 180,000 votes. The separatist Liberation Tigers of Tamil Eelam had called for a boycott of the election in the Northern and Eastern provinces, resulting in a minimal turnout, which the opposition claimed resulted in their defeat.

The term of the office of the president is 6 years, and the 3rd Amendment to the Constitution of Sri Lanka allows the president to call for an early presidential election after four years into their first term of office. Rajapaksa, whose first term began on 19 November 2005, had been constitutionally eligible to call an early presidential election since 19 November 2009. Accordingly, Rajapaksa informed the Commissioner of Elections about his intention to hold a presidential election before the end of his current term of office. He announced his intention via a Gazette Extraordinary, issued on 23 November 2009.

The elections would be the first presidential elections to be held in Sri Lanka since the end of the Sri Lankan civil war.

=== Preparations ===
On 27 November 2009, Dayananda Dissanayake, Commissioner of Elections, announced that the presidential election would be scheduled for 26 January 2010. Nominations were accepted from 9.00am to 11.00am IST on 17 December 2009. Sri Lankans registered with the Department of Elections, and eligible to vote, totaled 14,088,500, a significant increase from 13,327,160 in the previous presidential elections held in 2005. Over 11,000 polling booths were set up across the country for receiving ballots.

== Candidates ==
=== Mahinda Rajapaksa ===
In May 2009, the Sri Lanka Army tactfully defeated separatist the Liberation Tigers of Tamil Eelam, thus bringing an end to the 26-year long Sri Lankan civil war. A promise Sri Lanka's previous three presidents tried and failed to secure, the war victory greatly boosted the popularity of incumbent president Mahinda Rajapaksa, thus leading Rajapaksa's United People's Freedom Alliance to unprecedented victories in the provincial council elections following the war's end.

In November 2009, Rajapaksa called for an early presidential election almost two years prior to the expiration of his first term, and sought a fresh mandate and a longer term based on his current widespread support and popularity.

=== Sarath Fonseka ===
General Sarath Fonseka was considered a national hero for bringing an end to the Sri Lankan civil war as Commander of the Sri Lanka Army from 2005 to 2009. However, following the war victory, tensions grew between Fonseka and the incumbent president, with the former accusing Rajapaksa of sidelining him after the end of the war. Opposition parties expected early elections and approached Fonseka, asking him to run as a "common candidate" for the opposition against Rajapaksa.

After weeks of rumours, Fonseka eventually retired from the military in November 2009 and announced his candidacy two weeks later. He ran as the candidate of the New Democratic Front, using the swan symbol. He was backed by a number of opposition parties, including the United National Party, the Janatha Vimukthi Peramuna, and the Sri Lanka Muslim Congress, and also signed a memorandum of understanding with Tamil National Alliance leader R. Sampanthan.

=== Minor candidates ===
Apart from Rajapaksa and Fonseka, 20 other candidates had their nominations accepted, and appeared on ballot papers. One nomination—Nelson Perera of the Sri Lanka Progressive Front—was rejected on technical grounds. This was the most candidates in a Sri Lankan presidential election at the time, breaking the record of 13 in the 2005 presidential election.

Candidate	Party	Symbol	Notes
Siritunga Jayasuriya	United Socialist Party	Tri-shaw	Presidential candidate in 2005.
M. B. Thaminimulla	Okkoma Wasiyo Okkoma Rajavaru Sanvidhanaya	Till	
Sarath Manamendra	New Sinhala Heritage	Bow and arrow	
Achala Ashoka Suraweera	National Development Front	Coconut	Presidential candidate in 2005.
A. S. P. Liyanage	Sri Lanka Labour Party	Kangaroo	
Ven. Battaramulle Seelaratne Thero	Jana Setha Peramuna	Tractor	Withdrew candidacy on 14 January and endorsed Mahinda Rajapaksa.
Vikramabahu Karunaratne	Left Front	Table	Leader of the Left Front and Nava Sama Samaja Party.
Aithurus M. Illias	Independent	Pineapple	Former SLMC MP for Jaffna. Withdrew candidacy on 24 January and endorsed Sarath Fonseka.
Wije Dias	Socialist Equality Party	Pair of scissors	Presidential candidate in 2005.
Upali Sarath Kongahage	United National Alternative Front	Gate	Former UNP National List MP.
Lal Perera	Our National Front	Telephone	
Mohamed Musthaffa	Independent	Hat	UNP National List MP and former Deputy Minister of Higher Education. Withdrew candidacy on 15 January and endorsed Sarath Fonseka.
M. K. Shivajilingam	Independent	Ship	TNA/TELO MP for Jaffna.
W. M. U. B. Wijekoon	Independent	Jackfruit	Former UNP MP for Kurunegala.
M. C. M. Ismail	Democratic United National Front	Eagle	
Aruna de Zoyza	Ruhunu People's Party	Motor car	Presidential candidate in 2005.
Sanath Pinnaduwa	National Alliance	Double flags	
Adurage Senaratne Silva	Patriotic National Front	Flag	
C. J. Sugathsiri Gamage	United Democratic Front	Rabbit	
W. V. Mahiman Ranjith	Independent	Closet	Former UNP MP for Galle. Presidential candidate in 1999.

== Violence and violations of election laws ==
Sri Lankan police received nearly 975 election-related complaints, and 375 arrests were made relative thereto. The Centre for Monitoring Election Violence (CMEV) had recorded 809 incidents from 23 November 2009, when the elections were officially announced, to 25 January 2010. People’s Action for Free and Fair Elections (PAFFREL) recorded 666 incidents between 17 December 2009 and 25 January 2010. The UN, United States, and EU expressed concern over the levels of electoral violence. Election monitoring groups stated that the election was the most violent election the country had seen in more than 20 years. Although supporters of both main candidates were blamed for the incidents, the responsibility for most was pinned on Rajapaksa supporters. However, government politician Wimal Weerawansa accused the opposition of orchestrating violence against their own supporters and meetings in order to blame Rajapaksa supporters. According to the National Polls Observation Center, criminal gangs and deserters from the army were employed to incite violence.

The government promised tight security on the day of the election, deploying over 68,000 policemen to keep the polls safe, with the Sri Lankan Military providing additional support. The election monitoring group Centre for Free and Fair Elections deployed 6,500 monitors on election day, with the PAFFREL deploying a further 6,000, including 14 foreign monitors. The government denied rumours of possible post-election violence, with Foreign Minister Rohitha Bogollagama saying, "I don't think the people of Sri Lanka have time for street protests. It has never happened."

Election day was largely peaceful, with a few minor incidents reported. According to Inspector General of Police Mahinda Balasuriya, no major incidents occurred during the election. A number of explosions, however, were heard in Jaffna and Vavuniya in the north of the country during the day.

=== Violence ===
There were hundreds of violent incidents during the run-up to the election. Officially, there were four murders related to the election:

- 12 January 2010 – Kusumawathie Kuruppuarachchi, a 58-year-old mother was shot dead when gunmen on motorbikes opened fire on a bus carrying Fonseka supporters in Hungama, Hambantota District.
- 16 January 2010 – Saman Kumara, a Rajapaksa supporter, was shot dead in a clash between supporters of the two main candidates in Madurankuliya, Puttalam District.
- 18 January 2010 – Dhammika Herath, a 33-year-old businessman, was beaten to death whilst pasting posters supporting Fonseka in Wariyapola, Kurunegala District.
- 18 January 2010 – D. M. Suranga Indrajith, a 27-year-old driver for government minister Jayarathna Herath, was killed in a grenade attack in Vanduragala, Kurunegala District.

The CMEV has linked a fifth death to the elections:

- 19 January 2010 – Lingeswaran, a Fonseka supporter, was found dead on the Kandy-Matale railway line in Warapitiya, Matale District.

=== Misuse of state resources ===
There were accusations of widespread misuse of state property during the election campaign. Election observers and advocacy groups questioned the fundamental fairness of the campaign, accusing Rajapaksa of using state resources to finance his run. State-owned institutions paid for numerous advertisements supporting Rajapaksa, while public officials, state owned buildings and vehicles were allegedly used for Rajapaksa's campaign. State-owned television stations and news channels gave extensive coverage to Rajapaksa's campaign, with little to no mention of opposition candidates. Election commissioner Dayananda Dissanayake criticised the government for their misuse of state resources. Dissanayake claimed that the state media violated his guidelines, government institutions misbehaved, and in protest Dissanayake asked for approval to resign: "I request to be released," he said, just after he announced the results.

== Voting ==
Postal voting for the presidential election took place on 12 and 13 January 2010. A grace period was granted until noon on 26 January for postal voters. Applications for this form of absentee voting totalled 458,154, with 401,118 applications accepted by the Elections Department. More than 80% of postal voters cast their votes on 12 and 13 January, this period ending with "no major incidents" according to the National Polls Observation Centre and the People's Action for Free and Fair Election (PAFFREL).

Voting for the presidential election began at 7:00 am on 26 January 2010. A total of 11,098 election centres and 888 counting centres were set up throughout the country. The Elections Commissioner had requested that voters cast their ballots early in the day.

Rajapaksa voted in the morning at Medamulana, as did opposition leader Ranil Wickremesinghe in Colombo. NDF candidate Fonseka did not vote, claiming that he had not been allowed to do so despite his eligibility. The government later challenged this, stating that if he were not qualified to vote, he would "not (be) entitled to become elected". It was announced that legal action would be sought against his candidacy, although the election commissioner had ruled that he was eligible to run in the election. By the time voting ended at 4.00 pm, over 70% of eligible voters had turned out, though in the Northern and Eastern provinces, figures were less than 20%. Sri Lanka's stock market recorded an all-time high on election day; the Colombo Stock Exchange jumped 1.58%, putting it up 131% since the end of the war.

== Results ==
Voter turnout was 74.5%, with 10,495,451 voting out of the 14,088,500 voters registered. Of these, 10,393,613 were ruled valid votes, with 101,838 rejected. According to the end result, Rajapaksa was elected to a second term of office with 6,015,934 votes, or 57.88% of the vote. Fonseka finished second with 4,173,185 votes, or 40.15%. Fonseka did not accept the results, and declared that legal action would be taken. Supporters of Rajapaksa took to the streets on the announcement of the result, waving national flags and lighting firecrackers. Rajapaksa called his victory "a choice of the people" and declared himself president of everyone in the country.

Candidate	Party	Votes	%
Mahinda Rajapaksa	Sri Lanka Freedom Party	6,015,934	57.88
Sarath Fonseka	New Democratic Front	4,173,185	40.15
Mohomad Cassim Mohomad Ismail	Democratic United National Front	39,226	0.38
Achala Ashoka Suraweera	National Development Front	26,266	0.25
Channa Janaka Sugathsiri Gamage	United Democratic Front	23,290	0.22
W. V. Mahiman Ranjith	Independent	18,747	0.18
A. S. P Liyanage	Sri Lanka Labour Party	14,220	0.14
Sarath Manamendra	New Sinhala Heritage	9,684	0.09
M. K. Shivajilingam	Independent	9,662	0.09
Ukkubanda Wijekoon	Independent	9,381	0.09
Lal Perera	Our National Front	9,353	0.09
Siritunga Jayasuriya	United Socialist Party	8,352	0.08
Vikramabahu Karunaratne	Left Front	7,055	0.07
Aithurus M. Illias	Independent	6,131	0.06
Wije Dias	Socialist Equality Party	4,195	0.04
Sanath Pinnaduwa	National Alliance	3,523	0.03
M. Mohamed Musthaffa	Independent	3,134	0.03
Battaramulle Seelarathana Thero	Janasetha Peramuna	2,770	0.03
Senaratna de Silva	Patriotic National Front	2,620	0.03
Aruna de Zoyza	Ruhunu People's Party	2,618	0.03
Upali Sarath Kongahage	United National Alternative Front	2,260	0.02
Muthu Bandara Theminimulla	All Are Citizens, All Are Kings Organisation	2,007	0.02
Total		10,393,613	100.00
Valid votes		10,393,613	99.03
Invalid/blank votes		101,838	0.97
Total votes		10,495,451	100.00
Registered voters/turnout		14,088,500	74.50
Source: Election Commission

Popular vote (%)
Rajapaksha	57.88%
Fonseka	40.15%

Geographical Share (%)
Rajapaksha	79.38%
Fonseka	20.63%

=== By district ===
Districts won by Rajapaksa
Districts won by Fonseka

Summary of the 2010 Sri Lankan presidential election by electoral district
District	Province	Rajapaksa		Fonseka		Others		Turnout
District	Province	Votes	%	Votes	%	Votes	%	Turnout
Colombo	Western	614,740	52.93%	533,022	45.90%	13,620	1.17%	77.06%
Gampaha	Western	718,716	61.66%	434,506	37.28%	12,426	1.07%	79.66%
Kalutara	Western	412,562	63.06%	231,807	35.43%	9,880	1.51%	81.01%
Kandy	Central	406,636	54.16%	329,492	43.89%	14,658	1.95%	78.26%
Matale	Central	157,953	59.74%	100,513	38.01%	5,953	2.25%	77.94%
Nuwara Eliya	Central	151,604	43.77%	180,604	52.14%	14,174	4.09%	77.19%
Galle	Southern	386,971	63.69%	211,633	34.83%	9,017	1.48%	80.25%
Matara	Southern	296,155	65.53%	148,510	32.86%	7,264	1.61%	78.60%
Hambantota	Southern	226,887	67.21%	105,336	31.20%	5,341	1.58%	80.67%
Jaffna	Northern	44,154	24.75%	113,877	63.84%	20,338	11.40%	25.66%
Vanni	Northern	28,740	27.31%	70,367	66.86%	6,145	5.84%	40.33%
Batticaloa	Eastern	55,663	26.27%	146,057	68.93%	10,171	4.80%	64.83%
Digamadulla	Eastern	146,912	47.92%	153,105	49.94%	10,171	4.80%	73.54%
Trincomalee	Eastern	69,752	43.04%	87,661	54.09%	4,659	2.87%	68.22%
Kurunegala	North Western	582,784	63.08%	327,594	35.46%	13,515	1.46%	78.62%
Puttalam	North Western	201,981	58.70%	136,233	39.59%	5,899	1.71%	70.02%
Anuradhapura	North Central	298,448	66.32%	143,761	31.94%	7,829	1.74%	78.35%
Polonnauwa	North Central	144,889	64.92%	75,026	33.62%	3,260	1.46%	80.13%
Badulla	Uva	237,579	53.23%	198,835	44.55%	9,880	2.21%	78.70%
Monaragala	Uva	158,435	69.01%	66,803	29.10%	4,346	1.89%	77.12%
Ratnapura	Sabaragamuwa	377,734	63.76%	203,566	34.36%	11,126	1.88%	81.24%
Kegalle	Sabaragamuwa	296,639	61.80%	174,877	36.44%	8,448	1.76%	78.76%
Total		6,015,934	57.88%	4,173,185	40.15%	204,494	1.97%	74.50%

== Maps ==
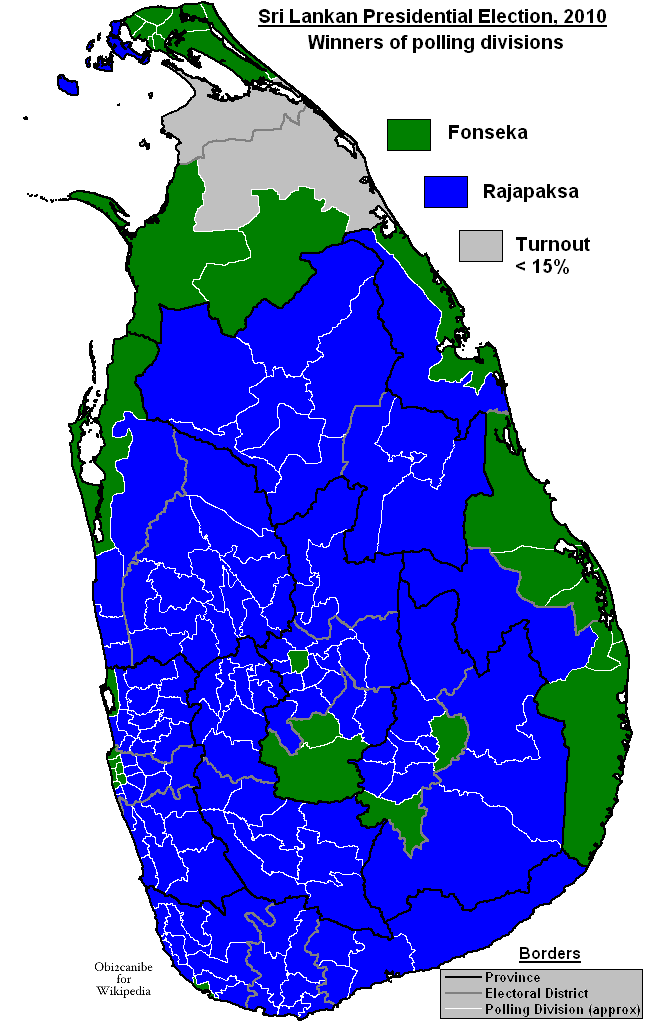
Winners of polling divisions

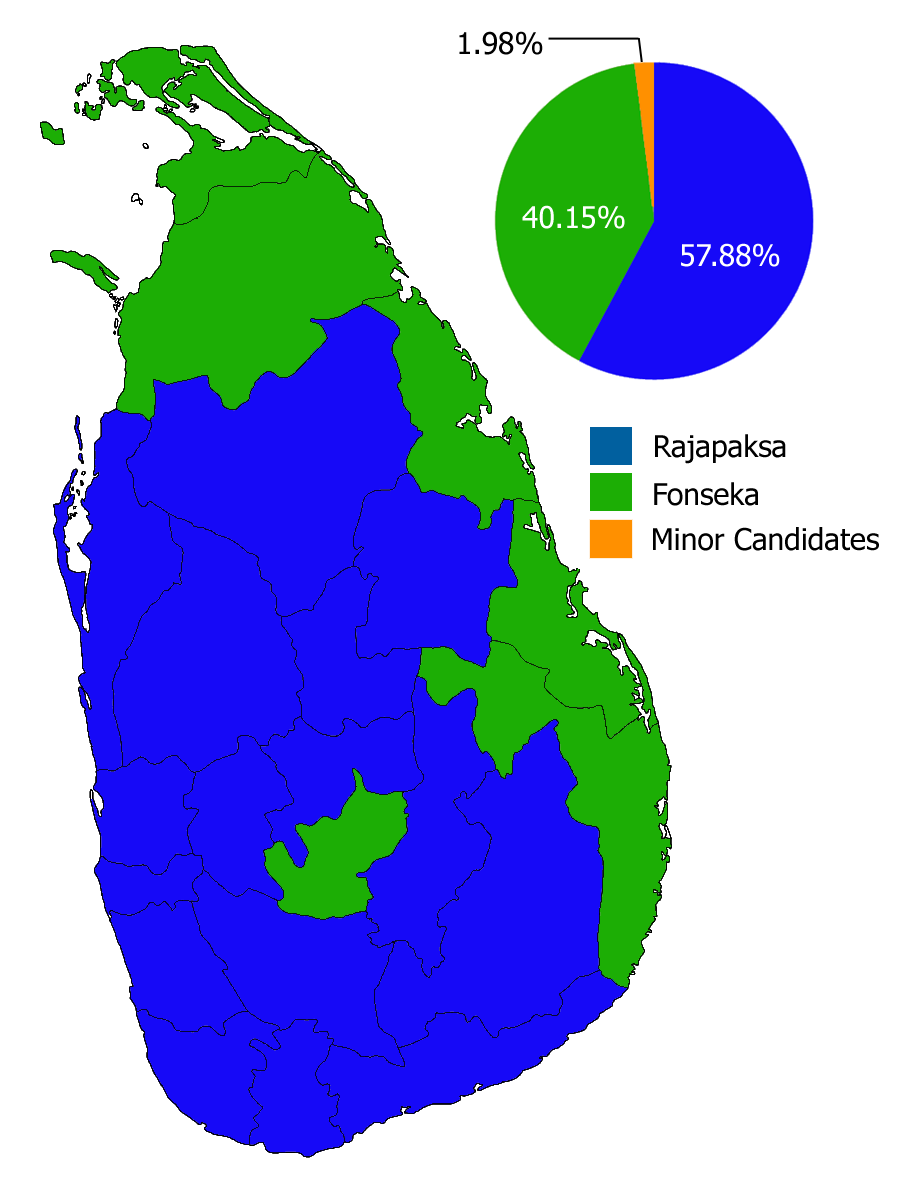
Winners of electoral districts

Majorities according to polling divisions

Majorities according to electoral districts

== Aftermath ==
=== Alleged plot to assassinate Rajapaksa ===
On the morning of 27 January, the Sri Lankan military surrounded a hotel where Fonseka and a number of opposition politicians had convened. The military claimed that 400 armed army deserters had gathered there, and demanded their surrender. Fonseka accused the military of preparing to arrest him if he won the elections. However, according to a military spokesman, they were there merely as a preventive measure, as the purpose of the gathering was uncertain. The military later arrested 10 men, who the opposition claimed were members of Fonseka's security contingent and not army deserters.

At a press briefing held on Thursday, 28 January, the Director of the Media Centre for National Security, Lakshman Hulugalle, told reporters that Gen. Fonseka moved into the hotel with over 70 retired army officers and deserters to plot the assassination of victorious President Mahinda Rajapaksa and his family. The Sri Lankan Ministry of Defence reported that they were still looking for evidence to prove Fonseka's involvement.

=== International reactions ===
- India – President Pratibha Patil and Prime Minister Manmohan Singh on Wednesday congratulated Sri Lankan President Mahinda Rajapaksa on his re-election and expressed confidence that the country would find lasting peace in which all communities would live with dignity and harmony. President Patil said, "I am confident that under your continued leadership, Sri Lanka will attain greater heights and find lasting peace." Prime Minister Singh said Rajapaksa's electoral success "is a reflection of the trust" the people of Sri Lanka had placed in him.
- Palestinian Popular Struggle Front – The Front sent a letter in support of President Rajapaksa. "On behalf of the Palestinians in and out of Palestine, (we) express (our) grateful thanks to President Mahinda Rajapasksa, who has been fighting for the Palestinians during the last 40 years."
- United Nations – UN chief Ban Ki-moon on Wednesday voiced relief that Sri Lanka's presidential polls went off relatively peacefully, and urged the country's political parties to abide by the official results. Secretary-General Ban stated, "I had been concerned at the level of violence during the campaign. I am relieved that the vote yesterday appears to have been relatively peaceful, despite some violent incidents."
- United States Department of State – The United States Embassy in Colombo released a statement which read, "The United States congratulates Sri Lanka for the first nationwide election in decades and President Rajapaksa on his victory. We look forward to continuing the partnership between our two countries and working with the Government and the people to support a peaceful and prosperous Sri Lanka." State Department spokesman Philip Crowley told reporters, "I think it is remarkable when you consider what Sri Lanka has come through recently. There is a process for resolving electoral disputes. We're obviously aware that there have been claims of victory and counterclaims" and ruled out further comments at that time.
- Russia – Russian President Dmitry Medvedev in his congratulatory message stated that the policy conducted by the president aimed at economic development and strengthening of stability will continue to settle social and political issues in the country.
- Japan – The Government of Japan congratulated President Mahinda Rajapaksa on his victory at the presidential election. Katsuya Okada, Japanese Foreign Minister, issuing a communique, stated that the Japanese government hopes the resettlement of displaced persons will be expedited in a country that has shown steady progress.
- Nepal – Nepali Congress (NC) President Girija Prasad Koirala has congratulated incumbent Sri Lankan President Mahinda Rajapaksa for his victory in the presidential election of Sri Lanka for the second time. He further went on to say "Your victory to the post of President is the result of your vital role to the establishment of peace, ending longtime armed conflict in Sri Lanka". He expressed his confidence that the peace and human rights would be institutionalised during Rajapaksa's term of office.
- Vietnam – Vietnam's Foreign Ministry spokeswoman Nguyễn Phương Nga congratulated Mahinda Rajapaksa's re-election as president. "We hope the Sri Lankan people, under the clear-sighted leadership of Mahinda Rajapaksa, will attain still greater achievements in national reconstruction and development," she said.
- European Union – Welcoming the peaceful conduct of presidential polls in Sri Lanka, the European Union today promised all out support for bringing political reconciliation in the country ravaged by decades of ethnic conflict. Congratulating President Mahinda Rajapaksa for winning the 26 January polls, it "welcomed that the Presidential Elections in Sri Lanka, the first election of this kind for many years, took place in an overall peaceful environment.
- Norway – Minister of the Environment and International Development Erik Solheim congratulated President Mahinda Rajapaksa on his re-election on 26 January. In his message, Solheim stated that "I would like to congratulate President Rajapaksa. Norway and Sri Lanka enjoy close and longstanding bilateral relations. We intend to continue our cooperation with the Government and people of Sri Lanka with a view to promoting lasting peace and development, We note that the election itself was relatively peaceful. However, we are concerned by reports of unrest and violent incidents during the lead-up to the election, as well as of possible violations of the election law. We urge that these allegations be investigated in accordance with Sri Lankan law and the country’s democratic traditions."

=== Presidential inauguration ===
The 3rd Amendment to the Constitution of Sri Lanka states that if a president was re-elected for a second term via an early presidential election, their second term starts on the next date corresponding to the date of the beginning of their first term. As such, Mahinda Rajapaksa was inaugurated for his second term of office at a ceremony held on the footsteps of the Presidential Secretariat in Colombo, on 19 November 2010. His oath of office was administered by Chief Justice Asoka de Silva.
