= Democratic People's Liberation Front =

Democratic People's Liberation Front ஜனநாயக மக்கள் விடுதலை முன்னணி
- President: Dharmalingam Siddarthan
- Secretary-General: Subramaniam Sathananthan
- Founded: 1987
- Headquarters: 16 Haig Road, Bambalapitiya, Colombo 4
- Ideology: Tamil nationalism

Election symbol
- Anchor

Democratic People's Liberation Front (DPLF; Tamil: ஜனநாயக மக்கள் விடுதலை முன்னணி) a registered political party in Sri Lanka and a front of the People's Liberation Organisation of Tamil Eelam (PLOTE).

== History ==
DPLF was established in 1987. While People's Liberation Organisation of Tamil Eelam was fighting the LTTE and other paramilitary factions in the North, they decided to enter democratic politics and gain power in parliament.

Even after their entrance to democratic politics, they would participate in battles such as the 1988 Maldives coup d'etat. PLOTE would enter parliament in 2001.

From 2001 to 2004 DPLF had D. Siddarthan, elected from Vanni Electoral District. DPLF lost its parliamentary representation in the 2004 elections.

== Electoral history ==
=== Parliamentary ===
Election year	Votes	Vote %	Seats won	+/–	Government
1989	18,502	0.33%	0 / 225	Steady	Extra parliamentary
1994	38,028	0.48%	3 / 225	▲3	Opposition (Note: As part of the EROS–PLOTE–TELO)
2000	20,848	0.24%	0 / 225	▼3	Extra parliamentary
2001	16,669	0.19%	1 / 225	▲1	Opposition
2004	7,326	0.08%	0 / 225	▼1	Extra parliamentary
2010	6,036	0.08%	0 / 225	Steady	Extra parliamentary
2015	Part of TNA		2 / 225	▲2	Opposition
2020	Part of TNA		1 / 225	▼1	Opposition
2024	Part of DTNA		0 / 225	▼1	Extra parliamentary
