= 2000 Sri Lankan parliamentary election =

Election

← 1994	10 October 2000	2001 →

All 225 seats in the Parliament of Sri Lanka 113 seats were needed for a majority
- Turnout: 75.63%
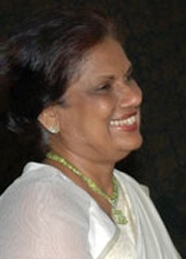

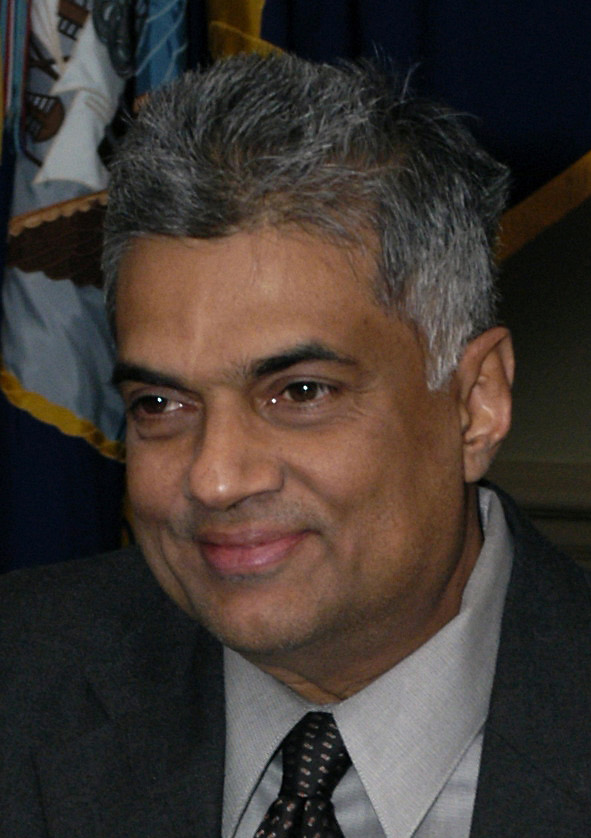
	First party	Second party	Third party
			JVP
Leader	Chandrika Kumaratunga	Ranil Wickremesinghe	Somawansa Amarasinghe
Party	PA	UNP	JVP
Leader since	1994	1994	1990
Leader's seat	n/a	Colombo District	n/a
Last election	48.94%, 105 seats	44.04%, 94 seats	1.13%, 1 seat
Seats won	107	89	10
Seat change	▲2	▼5	▲9
Popular vote	3,900,901	3,477,770	518,774
Percentage	45.11%	40.22%	6.00%
Swing	▼3.83%	▼3.82%	▲4.87%
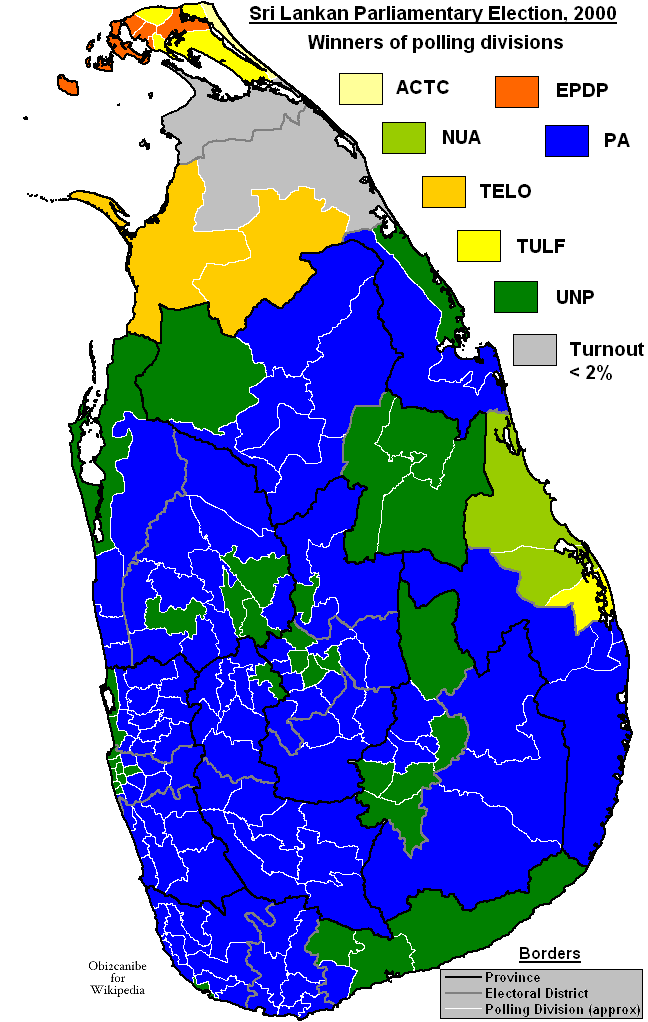
- Winners of polling divisions. PA in blue and UNP in green.
Prime Minister before election
Ratnasiri Wickremanayake
People's Alliance
Prime Minister-designate
Ratnasiri Wickremanayake
People's Alliance

Parliamentary elections were held in Sri Lanka on 10 October 2000.

The People's Alliance (PA) government Kumaratunga had led for six years was facing increasing criticism on two fronts: a series of military defeats at the hands of the rebel Liberation Tigers of Tamil Eelam in the country's civil war, and the faltering performance of the economy.

The elections were marred by violence. Seventy people were killed during the campaign, including six on election day itself. Both the UNP and SLMC accused the PA of election fraud and intimidation.

As was the case for most elections during the war, few ballots were cast in LTTE-held parts of the country.

== Results ==
The People's Alliance remained in office but had difficulty forming a majority in parliament. The resulting deadlock resulted in snap elections being held the next year.

Party	Votes	%	Seats		
Party	Votes	%	District	National	Total
People's Alliance (Note: Consisting of the Ceylon Workers' Congress (in Kurunegala, Nuwara Eliya and Ratnapura only), the Communist Party of Sri Lanka, the Desha Vimukthi Janatha Party, the Lanka Sama Samaja Party, Mahajana Eksath Peramuna, the Sri Lanka Freedom Party, Sri Lanka Mahajana Pakshaya and the Sri Lanka Muslim Congress (in Ampara and Trincomalee only).)	3,900,901	45.11	94	13	107
United National Party (Note: Including the Democratic Workers' Congress, the National Workers' Congress and the Up-Country People's Front.)	3,477,770	40.22	77	12	89
Janatha Vimukthi Peramuna	518,774	6.00	8	2	10
National Unity Alliance (Note: Including the Sri Lanka Muslim Congress in all districts except Ampara and Trincomalee.)	197,983	2.29	3	1	4
Sinhala Heritage	127,863	1.48	0	1	1
Tamil United Liberation Front	106,033	1.23	5	0	5
Eelam People's Democratic Party	50,890	0.59	4	0	4
New Left Front	32,275	0.37	0	0	0
All Ceylon Tamil Congress	27,323	0.32	1	0	1
Tamil Eelam Liberation Organization	26,112	0.30	3	0	3
Ceylon Workers' Congress	23,013	0.27	0	0	0
Democratic People's Liberation Front	20,848	0.24	0	0	0
Puravesi Peramuna	20,006	0.23	0	0	0
Left and Democratic Alliance	9,731	0.11	0	0	0
Motherland People's Party	7,293	0.08	0	0	0
National Union of Workers	5,737	0.07	0	0	0
The Liberal Party	5,188	0.06	0	0	0
Democratic United National Front	4,405	0.05	0	0	0
United Lalith Front	4,048	0.05	0	0	0
Eksath Sinhala Maha Sabha	3,927	0.05	0	0	0
Muslim United Liberation Front	2,575	0.03	0	0	0
National People's Party	1,542	0.02	0	0	0
Sri Lanka Muslim Katchi	1,287	0.01	0	0	0
Bahujana Nidahas Peramuna	1,242	0.01	0	0	0
Sri Lanka Progressive Front	1,136	0.01	0	0	0
People's Liberation Solidarity Front	812	0.01	0	0	0
Jathinka Sangwardhena Peramuna	769	0.01	0	0	0
Ruhuna Janatha Party	658	0.01	0	0	0
Socialist Equality Party	389	0.00	0	0	0
Independents	67,138	0.78	1	0	1
Total	8,647,668	100.00	196	29	225
Valid votes	8,647,668	94.73			
Invalid/blank votes	481,155	5.27			
Total votes	9,128,823	100.00			
Registered voters/turnout	12,071,062	75.63			
Source: Election Commission
