= Bibile (disambiguation) =

Bibile is a town in the Monaragala District of Sri Lanka. It may also refer to:

- Bibile Divisional Secretariat, Divisional Secretariat in the Monaragala District of Sri Lanka
- Bibile Electoral District, an electoral district of Sri Lanka between March 1960 and February 1989
- Bibile Polling Division, a polling division in Sri Lanka

== See also ==
- Bibile (name)
