= Results of the 2010 Sri Lankan general election by electoral district =

Results of the 2010 Sri Lankan general election by electoral district.

== Number of votes ==
Electoral District	Province	UPFA	UNF	DNA	TNA	Ind	UCPF	TMVP	SMBP	TULF	TNPF	DPLF	SLNF	Others	Valid Votes	Rejected Votes	Total Polled	Registered Electors	Turnout %
Ampara	EA	132,096	90,757	2,917	26,895	2,029		1,490					56	696	256,946	15,516	272,462	420,835	64.74%
Anuradhapura	NC	221,204	80,360	18,129		528			11,445				147	725	332,538	22,930	355,468	579,261	61.37%
Badulla	UV	203,689	112,886	15,768		5,073	11,481		137					644	349,678	24,169	373,847	574,814	65.04%
Batticaloa	EA	62,009	22,935	324	66,235	6,034		16,886	11	4,424		136		1,624	180,618	14,749	195,367	333,644	58.56%
Colombo	WE	480,896	339,750	110,683		1,222			35	834			924	5,031	939,375	50,354	989,729	1,521,854	65.03%
Galle	SO	305,307	120,101	33,663		895			30				330	1,062	461,388	24,013	485,401	761,815	63.72%
Gampaha	WE	589,476	266,523	69,747		2,697							625	1,165	930,233	50,234	980,467	1,474,464	66.50%
Hambantota	SO	174,808	83,027	19,186		252							81	700	278,054	11,240	289,294	421,186	68.69%
Jaffna	NO	47,622	12,624	201	65,119	8,744		69		2,892	6,362			4,870	148,503	19,774	168,277	721,359	23.33%
Kalutara	WE	313,836	139,596	36,722		1,476			22				172	1,031	492,855	51,751	544,606	813,233	66.97%
Kandy	CE	339,819	192,798	23,728		832			25				921	1,103	559,226	58,333	617,559	970,456	63.64%
Kegalle	SA	242,463	104,925	13,518		438			44				256	811	362,455	25,965	388,420	613,938	63.27%
Kurunegala	NW	429,316	213,713	26,440		1,032			37				483	1,415	672,436	53,130	725,566	1,183,649	61.30%
Matale	CE	131,069	55,737	7,636		660			13				75	560	195,750	19,310	215,060	342,684	62.76%
Matara	SO	213,937	91,114	20,465		410		49	19				478	1,110	327,582	14,289	341,871	578,858	59.06%
Monaragala	UV	120,634	28,892	9,018		204			10				136	597	159,491	10,149	169,640	300,642	56.43%
Nuwara Eliya	CE	149,111	96,885	3,984		1,995	13,189		225				20	825	266,234	37,236	303,470	457,137	66.38%
Polonnaruwa	NC	118,694	45,732	6,457		158		53	6				47	324	171,471	14,798	186,269	280,337	66.44%
Puttalam	NW	167,769	81,152	8,792		468			14				266	331	258,792	21,562	280,354	495,575	56.57%
Ratnapura	SA	305,327	125,076	11,053		573			15				97	1,232	443,373	37,022	480,395	734,651	65.39%
Trincomalee	EA	59,784	39,691	2,519	33,268	594		1,712	14		1,182		170	808	139,742	10,240	149,982	241,133	62.20%
Vanni	NO	37,522	12,783	301	41,673	2,633		25	58	1,073		5,900	29	4,980	106,977	10,208	117,185	266,975	43.89%
Total		4,846,388	2,357,057	441,251	233,190	38,947	24,670	20,284	12,170	9,223	7,544	6,036	5,313	31,644	8,033,717	596,972	8,630,689	14,088,500	61.26%

== Percentage of votes ==
Electoral District	Province	UPFA	UNF	DNA	TNA	Ind	UCPF	TMVP	SMBP	TULF	TNPF	DPLF	SLNF	Others	Total
Ampara	EA	51.41%	35.32%	1.14%	10.47%	0.79%		0.58%					0.02%	0.27%	100.00%
Anuradhapura	NC	66.52%	24.17%	5.45%		0.16%			3.44%				0.04%	0.22%	100.00%
Badulla	UV	58.25%	32.28%	4.51%		1.45%	3.28%		0.04%					0.18%	100.00%
Batticaloa	EA	34.33%	12.70%	0.18%	36.67%	3.34%		9.35%	0.01%	2.45%		0.08%		0.90%	100.00%
Colombo	WE	51.19%	36.17%	11.78%		0.13%			0.00%	0.09%			0.10%	0.54%	100.00%
Galle	SO	66.17%	26.03%	7.30%		0.19%			0.01%				0.07%	0.23%	100.00%
Gampaha	WE	63.37%	28.65%	7.50%		0.29%							0.07%	0.13%	100.00%
Hambantota	SO	62.87%	29.86%	6.90%		0.09%							0.03%	0.25%	100.00%
Jaffna	NO	32.07%	8.50%	0.14%	43.85%	5.89%		0.05%		1.95%	4.28%			3.28%	100.00%
Kalutara	WE	63.68%	28.32%	7.45%		0.30%			0.00%				0.03%	0.21%	100.00%
Kandy	CE	60.77%	34.48%	4.24%		0.15%			0.00%				0.16%	0.20%	100.00%
Kegalle	SA	66.89%	28.95%	3.73%		0.12%			0.01%				0.07%	0.22%	100.00%
Kurunegala	NW	63.84%	31.78%	3.93%		0.15%			0.01%				0.07%	0.21%	100.00%
Matale	CE	66.96%	28.47%	3.90%		0.34%			0.01%				0.04%	0.29%	100.00%
Matara	SO	65.31%	27.81%	6.25%		0.13%		0.01%	0.01%				0.15%	0.34%	100.00%
Monaragala	UV	75.64%	18.12%	5.65%		0.13%			0.01%				0.09%	0.37%	100.00%
Nuwara Eliya	CE	56.01%	36.39%	1.50%		0.75%	4.95%		0.08%				0.01%	0.31%	100.00%
Polonnaruwa	NC	69.22%	26.67%	3.77%		0.09%		0.03%	0.00%				0.03%	0.19%	100.00%
Puttalam	NW	64.83%	31.36%	3.40%		0.18%			0.01%				0.10%	0.13%	100.00%
Ratnapura	SA	68.86%	28.21%	2.49%		0.13%			0.00%				0.02%	0.28%	100.00%
Trincomalee	EA	42.78%	28.40%	1.80%	23.81%	0.43%		1.23%	0.01%		0.85%		0.12%	0.58%	100.00%
Vanni	NO	35.07%	11.95%	0.28%	38.96%	2.46%		0.02%	0.05%	1.00%		5.52%	0.03%	4.66%	100.00%
Total		60.33%	29.34%	5.49%	2.90%	0.48%	0.31%	0.25%	0.15%	0.11%	0.09%	0.08%	0.07%	0.39%	100.00%

== Seats ==
Electoral District	Province	UPFA	UNF	DNA	TNA	Ind	UCPF	TMVP	SMBP	TULF	TNPF	DPLF	SLNF	Others	Total
Ampara	EA	4	2	0	1	0		0					0	0	7
Anuradhapura	NC	7	2	0		0			0				0	0	9
Badulla	UV	6	2	0		0	0		0					0	8
Batticaloa	EA	1	1	0	3	0		0	0	0		0		0	5
Colombo	WE	10	7	2		0			0	0			0	0	19
Galle	SO	7	2	1		0			0				0	0	10
Gampaha	WE	12	5	1		0							0	0	18
Hambantota	SO	5	2	0		0							0	0	7
Jaffna	NO	3	1	0	5	0		0		0	0			0	9
Kalutara	WE	7	2	1		0			0				0	0	10
Kandy	CE	8	4	0		0			0				0	0	12
Kegalle	SA	7	2	0		0			0				0	0	9
Kurunegala	NW	10	5	0		0			0				0	0	15
Matale	CE	4	1	0		0			0				0	0	5
Matara	SO	6	2	0		0		0	0				0	0	8
Monaragala	UV	4	1	0		0			0				0	0	5
Nuwara Eliya	CE	5	2	0		0	0		0				0	0	7
Polonnaruwa	NC	4	1	0		0		0	0				0	0	5
Puttalam	NW	6	2	0		0			0				0	0	8
Ratnapura	SA	7	3	0		0			0				0	0	10
Trincomalee	EA	2	1	0	1	0		0	0		0		0	0	4
Vanni	NO	2	1	0	3	0		0	0	0		0	0	0	6
National List		17	9	2	1	0	0	0	0	0	0	0	0	0	29
Total		144	60	7	14	0	0	0	0	0	0	0	0	0	225

== See also ==
Results of the 2010 Sri Lankan general election by province
