= Hambegamuwa Grama Niladhari Division =

Hambegamuwa
- Coordinates: 6.509681°N 80.916072°E
- Country: Sri Lanka
- Province: Uva Province
- District: Moneragala District
- Divisional Secretariat: Thanamalvila Divisional Secretariat
- Electoral District: Moneragala Electoral District
- Polling Division: Wellawaya Polling Division

Population (2012)
  - Total: 2,429
- ISO 3166 code: LK-8230020

Hambegamuwa Grama Niladhari Division

Hambegamuwa Grama Niladhari Division is a Grama Niladhari Division of the Thanamalvila Divisional Secretariat, of Moneragala District, of Uva Province, Sri Lanka.

== Demographics ==
=== Ethnicity ===
Hambegamuwa by Ethnicity
1. Sinhalese (99.8%)
2. Sri Lankan Tamil (0.2%)
3. Indian Tamil (0%)
4. Moor (0%)
5. Malay (0%)
6. Burgher (0%)
7. Chetty (0%)
8. Bharatha (0%)
9. Others (0%)

=== Religion ===
Hambegamuwa by Religion
1. Buddhist 99.1 (99.0%)
2. Hindu 0.2 (0.20%)
3. Islam 0 (0.00%)
4. Roman Catholic 0.7 (0.70%)
5. Other Christian 0.1 (0.10%)
6. Others 0 (0.00%)
