= Results of the 2010 Sri Lankan general election by province =

Results of the 2010 Sri Lankan general election by province.

== Number of votes ==
Province	UPFA	UNF	DNA	TNA	Ind	UCPF	TMVP	SMBP	TULF	TNPF	DPLF	SLNF	Others	Valid Votes	Rejected Votes	Total Polled	Registered Electors	Turnout %
Central	619,999	345,420	35,348		3,487	13,189		263				1,016	2,488	1,021,210	114,879	1,136,089	1,770,277	64.18%
Eastern	253,889	153,383	5,760	126,398	8,657		20,088	35	4,424	1,182	136	226	3,128	577,306	40,505	617,811	995,612	62.05%
Northern	85,144	25,407	502	106,792	11,377		94	58	3,965	6,362	5,900	29	9,850	255,480	29,982	285,462	988,334	28.88%
North Central	339,898	126,092	24,586		686		53	11,451				194	1,049	504,009	37,728	541,737	859,598	63.02%
North Western	597,085	294,865	35,232		1,500			51				749	1,746	931,228	74,692	1,005,920	1,679,224	59.90%
Sabaragamuwa	547,790	230,001	24,571		1,011			59				353	2,043	805,828	62,987	868,815	1,348,589	64.42%
Southern	694,052	294,242	73,314		1,557		49	49				889	2,872	1,067,024	49,542	1,116,566	1,761,859	63.37%
Uva	324,323	141,778	24,786		5,277	11,481		147				136	1,241	509,169	34,318	543,487	875,456	62.08%
Western	1,384,208	745,869	217,152		5,395			57	834			1,721	7,227	2,362,463	152,339	2,514,802	3,809,551	66.01%
Total	4,846,388	2,357,057	441,251	233,190	38,947	24,670	20,284	12,170	9,223	7,544	6,036	5,313	31,644	8,033,717	596,972	8,630,689	14,088,500	61.26%

== Percentage of votes ==
Province	UPFA	UNF	DNA	TNA	Ind	UCPF	TMVP	SMBP	TULF	TNPF	DPLF	SLNF	Others	Total
Central	60.71%	33.82%	3.46%		0.34%	1.29%		0.03%				0.10%	0.24%	100.00%
Eastern	43.98%	26.57%	1.00%	21.89%	1.50%		3.48%	0.01%	0.77%	0.20%	0.02%	0.04%	0.54%	100.00%
Northern	33.33%	9.94%	0.20%	41.80%	4.45%		0.04%	0.02%	1.55%	2.49%	2.31%	0.01%	3.86%	100.00%
North Central	67.44%	25.02%	4.88%		0.14%		0.01%	2.27%				0.04%	0.21%	100.00%
North Western	64.12%	31.66%	3.78%		0.16%			0.01%				0.08%	0.19%	100.00%
Sabaragamuwa	67.98%	28.54%	3.05%		0.13%			0.01%				0.04%	0.25%	100.00%
Southern	65.05%	27.58%	6.87%		0.15%		0.00%	0.00%				0.08%	0.27%	100.00%
Uva	63.70%	27.84%	4.87%		1.04%	2.25%		0.03%				0.03%	0.24%	100.00%
Western	58.59%	31.57%	9.19%		0.23%			0.00%	0.04%			0.07%	0.31%	100.00%
Total	60.33%	29.34%	5.49%	2.90%	0.48%	0.31%	0.25%	0.15%	0.11%	0.09%	0.08%	0.07%	0.39%	100.00%

== Seats ==
Province	UPFA	UNF	DNA	TNA	Ind	UCPF	TMVP	SMBP	TULF	TNPF	DPLF	SLNF	Others	Total
Central	17	7	0		0	0		0				0	0	24
Eastern	7	4	0	5	0		0	0	0	0	0	0	0	16
Northern	5	2	0	8	0		0	0	0	0	0	0	0	15
North Central	16	7	0		0		0	0				0	0	23
North Western	11	3	0		0			0				0	0	14
Sabaragamuwa	14	5	0		0			0				0	0	19
Southern	18	6	1		0		0	0				0	0	25
Uva	10	3	0		0	0		0				0	0	13
Western	29	14	4		0			0	0			0	0	47
National List	17	9	2	1	0	0	0	0	0	0	0	0	0	29
Total	144	60	7	14	0	0	0	0	0	0	0	0	0	225

== See also ==
Results of the 2010 Sri Lankan general election by electoral district
