= Jagath Pushpakumara =

Sri Lankan politician

Hon. Jagath Pushpakumara MP
- ජගත් පුෂ්පකුමාර ஜகத் புஷ்பகுமாரா

Member of Parliament for Monaragala District
- In office 1994–2000
- In office 2001–2015
- In office 2020–2024

Deputy Minister of Livestock Development and Estate Infrastructure
- In office 1997–1999

Deputy Minister Mahaweli Development
- In office 1999–2000

Deputy Minister Samurdhi and Poverty Alleviation
- In office 2004–2006

Deputy Minister of Agriculture
- In office 2005–2006

Non-Cabinet Minister of Rural Livelihood Development & Social Services and Welfare
- In office 2006–2007

Non-Cabinet Minister of Nation Building and Estate Infrastructure Development
- In office 2007–2010

Deputy Minister of Agriculture
- In office 23 April 2010 – 22 November 2010

Minister of Coconut Development and Janatha Estate Development
- In office 22 November 2010 – 9 January 2015

Deputy Minister of Planatation Industries
- In office 22 March 2015 – 17 August 2015

Personal details
- Born: 3 April 1963 (age 63) Hambantota, Sri Lanka
- Party: Sri Lanka Freedom Party
- Children: 2
- Education: Bandarawela Central College; S.Thomas' College
- Profession: Politician

Arukathu Patabendige Jagath Pushpakumara, commonly known as Jagath Pushpakumara (Sinhala: ජගත් පුෂ්පකුමාර), is a Sri Lankan politician and Member of Parliament.

== Political career ==
In 1993, Pushpakumara started his political career as the Wellawaya Electoral Organizer for Sri Lanka Freedom Party (SLFP). Then he became a Date Central Committee Member from 2010 to the present. During that same time, he worked as the SLFP Deputy Secretary from February 2015 to 2018. Apart from them, he was an active member of several committees including; the Committee on Public Enterprises, Committee on Public Petitions and Ministerial Consultative Committee on Labour. In the second government under President Mahinda Rajapaksa, Pushpakumara was appointed as the Minister of Coconut Development.

On 28 December 2015, Pushpakumara arrived at the Presidential Commission of Inquiry Into Large-scale Corruption and Fraud. In 2016, he was investigated for allegedly using over Rs.5 million rupees of government money to buy land under his wife's name. That same year, his official residence in Wijerama Mawatha was damaged by an electrical fire. In 2020, he made a controversial statement at a public election rally that there was a conspiracy to assassinate him.

Pushpakumara contested the 2020 parliamentary election as a Sri Lanka Podujana Peramuna (SLPP) candidate in Monaragala District and was elected to the Parliament of Sri Lanka, finishing the fourth among the SLPP candidates. On 22 February 2022, he was appointed as the new Chairman of the Committee on Public Petitions for the Second Session of the Ninth Parliament. In May 2022, it is reported that SLFP representatives Nimal Siripala de Silva, Mahinda Amaraweera, Duminda Dissanayake, Jagath Pushpakumara and Lasantha Alagiyawanna have decided to go beyond the party decision and take over the ministries of the new government under Ranil Wickramasinghe.

Electoral history of Jagath Pushpakumara
| Election | Constituency | Party | Alliance | Votes | Result |
|---|---|---|---|---|---|
| 1994 parliamentary | Monaragala District | Sri Lanka Freedom Party | People's Alliance | 21,100 | Elected |
| 2001 parliamentary | Monaragala District | Sri Lanka Freedom Party | People's Alliance | 32,754 | Elected |
| 2004 parliamentary | Monaragala District | Sri Lanka Freedom Party | United People's Freedom Alliance | 52,887 | Elected |
| 2010 parliamentary | Monaragala District | Sri Lanka Freedom Party | United People's Freedom Alliance | 67,903 | Elected |
| 2020 parliamentary | Monaragala District | Sri Lanka Freedom Party | Sri Lanka People's Freedom Alliance | 66,176 | Elected |
