= Ranjith Madduma Bandara =

Sri Lankan politician

Hon. Ranjith Madduma Bandara MP
- රංජිත් මද්දුම බණ්ඩාර ரஞ்சித் மத்தும பண்டார
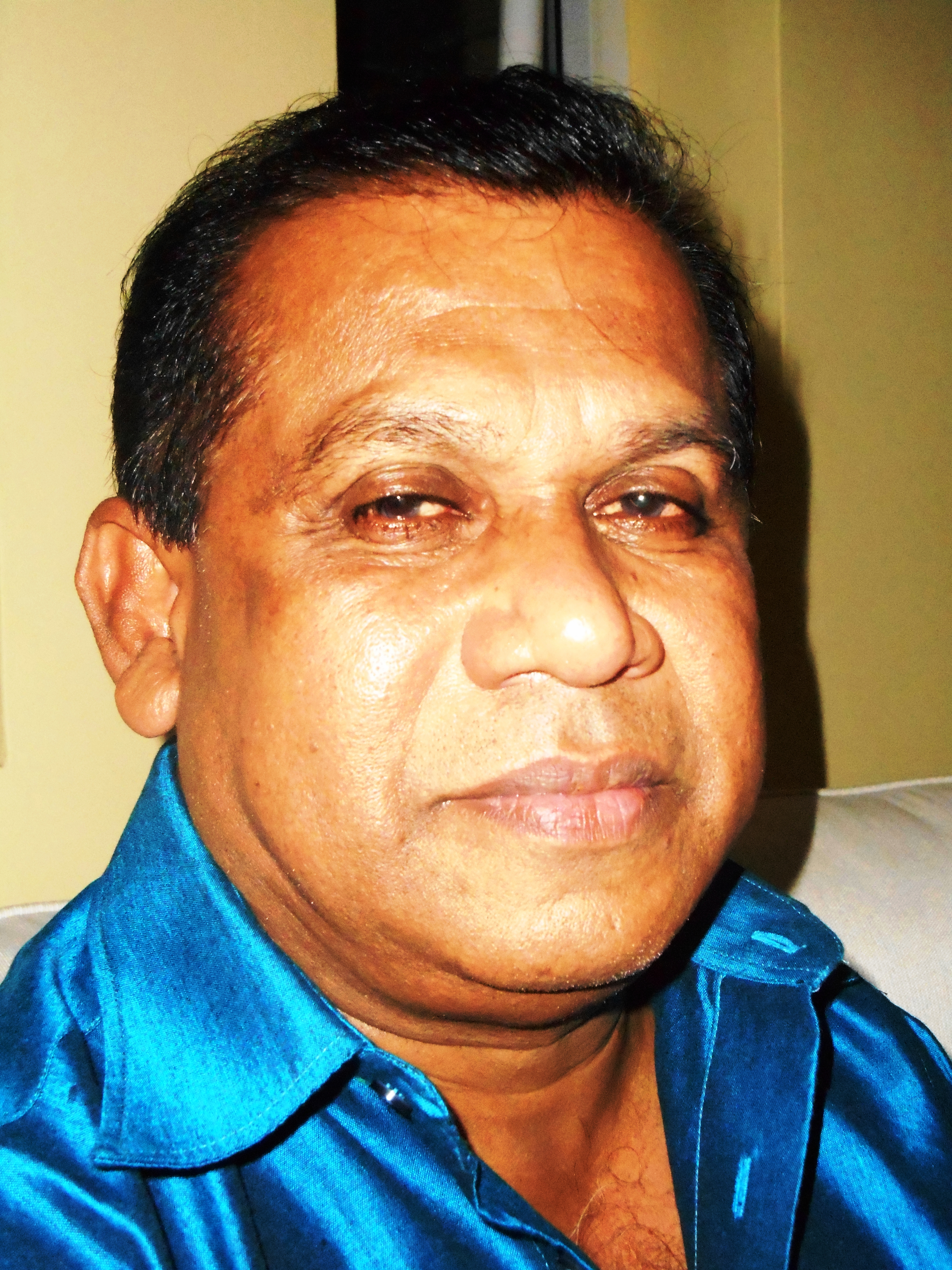

Minister of Law and Order
- In office 8 March 2018 – 18 November 2019
- President: Maithripala Sirisena
- Prime Minister: Ranil Wickremesinghe
- Preceded by: Ranil Wickramasinghe

Minister of Public Administration
- In office 4 September 2015 – 18 November 2019
- President: Maithripala Sirisena
- Prime Minister: Ranil Wickremesinghe

Minister of Internal Transport
- In office 12 January 2015 – 17 August 2015
- President: Maithripala Sirisena
- Prime Minister: Ranil Wickremesinghe

General Secretary of the Samagi Jana Balawegaya
- Incumbent
- Assumed office 11 February 2020
- Leader: Sajith Premadasa
- Preceded by: Position established
- Succeeded by: Kabir Hashim

Member of Parliament for National List
- Incumbent
- Assumed office 20 August 2020

Member of Parliament for Monaragala District
- In office 9 March 1989 – 20 August 2020

Personal details
- Born: 25 August 1954 (age 72) Medagama, Dominion of Ceylon
- Party: Samagi Jana Balawegaya (since 2020)
- Other political affiliations: United National Party (before 2020)
- Relations: R. M. Gunasekera (father), Dharmadasa Banda (uncle)
- Children: Chamathka Ratnayake, Manthika Ratnayake
- Education: Ananda College

Rathnayaka Mudiyanselage Ranjith Madduma Bandara (born 25 August 1954) is a Sri Lankan politician and a member of the Parliament of Sri Lanka. He served as Minister of Law and Order and Minister of Public Administration and Management from March 2018 to November 2019. He has also acted as the Minister of Transport.

His father R. M. Gunasekera, former member of the parliament for Bibile, was assassinated when he was seven years old. His uncle was Dharmadasa Banda. He was educated at Ananda College and became a planter and a businessman.

He is a long time member of the United National Party, and has held many positions in the party. On 11 February 2020, he was appointed as the inaugural general secretary of the Samagi Jana Balawegaya.
