= Padma Udayashantha Gunasekara =

Sri Lankan politician

Hon. R. M. P. U. S. Gunasekera

Member of Parliament for Monaragala District
- In office 2004–2010

Personal details
- Party: National Freedom Front
- Other political affiliations: United People's Freedom Alliance

Rathnayaka Mudiyanselage Padma Udhaya Shantha Gunasekera (R.M. Padma Udayashantha Gunasekara) is a Sri Lankan politician and a former member of the Parliament of Sri Lanka. Member of the Sri Lankan Parliament for Monaragala District . Member of the 15th parliament of Sri Lanka. He was the son of Dharmadasa Banda.
