= Monaragala Polling Division =

Monaragala
- Polling Division
- Interactive map of Monaragala
- Coordinates: 6.911641°N 81.415231°E
- Country: Sri Lanka
- Province: Uva Province, Sri Lanka
- Electoral District: Monaragala Electoral District

Area
  - Total: 1,459.8 km^{2} (563.6 sq mi)

Population (2012)
  - Total: 143,663
  - Density: 98/km^{2} (250/sq mi)
- ISO 3166 code: EC-20B

The Monaragala Polling Division is a polling division in the Monaragala Electoral District in Uva Province, Sri Lanka.

== Presidential Election Results ==
=== Summary ===
In seven of the eight presidential elections listed below (1982–2019), the candidate who won the most votes in Monaragala also won nationally.

Year	Monaragala	Monaragala Electoral District	MAE %	Sri Lanka	MAE %
2019	SLPP	SLPP	1.48%	SLPP	10.79%
2015	UPFA	UPFA	0.25%	NDF	13.95%
2010	UPFA	UPFA	0.34%	UPFA	10.55%
2005	UPFA	UPFA	0.24%	UPFA	6.39%
1999	PA	PA	3.01%	PA	3.75%
1994	PA	PA	1.81%	PA	3.08%
1988	UNP	UNP	8.06%	UNP	3.55%
1982	UNP	UNP	2.23%	UNP	5.34%
Matches/Mean MAE	7/8	7/8	2.18%	8/8	7.18%

=== 2019 Sri Lankan Presidential Election ===
Party	Monaragala		Monaragala Electoral District		Sri Lanka	
Party	Votes	%	Votes	%	Votes	%
SLPP	59,360	63.99%	208,814	65.34%	6,924,255	52.25%
NDF	28,688	30.93%	92,539	28.95%	5,564,239	41.99%
NMPP	2,537	2.74%	11,235	3.52%	418,553	3.16%
Other Parties (with < 1%)	2,174	2.34%	7,016	2.20%	345,452	2.61%
Valid Votes	92,759	98.87%	319,604	99.07%	13,252,499	98.99%
Rejected Votes	1,059	1.13%	3,000	0.93%	135,452	1.01%
Total Polled	93,818	86.80%	322,604	88.02%	13,387,951	83.71%
Registered Electors	108,090		366,524		15,992,568	

=== 2015 Sri Lankan Presidential Election ===
Party	Monaragala		Monaragala Electoral District		Sri Lanka	
Party	Votes	%	Votes	%	Votes	%
UPFA	50,408	61.69%	172,745	61.45%	5,768,090	47.58%
NDF	30,381	37.18%	105,276	37.45%	6,217,162	51.28%
Other Parties (with < 1%)	927	1.13%	3,095	1.10%	138,200	1.14%
Valid Votes	81,716	98.66%	281,116	98.79%	12,123,452	98.85%
Rejected Votes	1,113	1.34%	3,449	1.21%	140,925	1.15%
Total Polled	82,829	76.92%	284,565	79.90%	12,264,377	78.69%
Registered Electors	107,678		356,146		15,585,942	

=== 2010 Sri Lankan Presidential Election ===
Party	Monaragala		Monaragala Electoral District		Sri Lanka	
Party	Votes	%	Votes	%	Votes	%
UPFA	46,731	68.63%	158,435	69.01%	6,015,934	57.88%
NDF	19,990	29.36%	66,803	29.10%	4,173,185	40.15%
Other Parties (with < 1%)	1,375	2.02%	4,346	1.89%	204,494	1.97%
Valid Votes	68,096	98.92%	229,584	99.02%	10,393,613	99.03%
Rejected Votes	743	1.08%	2,272	0.98%	101,838	0.97%
Total Polled	68,839	71.42%	231,856	73.94%	10,495,451	66.70%
Registered Electors	96,386		313,554		15,734,587	

=== 2005 Sri Lankan Presidential Election ===
Party	Monaragala		Monaragala Electoral District		Sri Lanka	
Party	Votes	%	Votes	%	Votes	%
UPFA	37,575	56.66%	126,094	56.94%	4,887,152	50.29%
UNP	27,754	41.85%	92,244	41.65%	4,706,366	48.43%
Other Parties (with < 1%)	989	1.49%	3,112	1.41%	123,521	1.27%
Valid Votes	66,318	98.67%	221,450	98.82%	9,717,039	98.88%
Rejected Votes	897	1.33%	2,636	1.18%	109,869	1.12%
Total Polled	67,215	76.43%	224,086	78.54%	9,826,908	69.51%
Registered Electors	87,943		285,327		14,136,979	

=== 1999 Sri Lankan Presidential Election ===
Party	Monaragala		Monaragala Electoral District		Sri Lanka	
Party	Votes	%	Votes	%	Votes	%
PA	30,055	54.81%	92,049	51.07%	4,312,157	51.12%
UNP	21,049	38.39%	73,695	40.89%	3,602,748	42.71%
JVP	2,465	4.50%	10,456	5.80%	343,927	4.08%
Other Parties (with < 1%)	1,266	2.31%	4,045	2.24%	176,679	2.09%
Valid Votes	54,835	97.36%	180,245	97.74%	8,435,754	97.69%
Rejected Votes	1,489	2.64%	4,161	2.26%	199,536	2.31%
Total Polled	56,324	76.80%	184,406	78.39%	8,635,290	72.17%
Registered Electors	73,336		235,252		11,965,536	

=== 1994 Sri Lankan Presidential Election ===
Party	Monaragala		Monaragala Electoral District		Sri Lanka	
Party	Votes	%	Votes	%	Votes	%
PA	31,950	65.06%	96,620	63.20%	4,709,205	62.28%
UNP	15,801	32.18%	52,026	34.03%	2,715,283	35.91%
Ind 2	687	1.40%	1,966	1.29%	58,888	0.78%
Other Parties (with < 1%)	670	1.36%	2,257	1.48%	78,152	1.03%
Valid Votes	49,108	97.12%	152,869	97.46%	7,561,526	98.03%
Rejected Votes	1,456	2.88%	3,977	2.54%	151,706	1.97%
Total Polled	50,564	78.72%	156,846	77.23%	7,713,232	69.12%
Registered Electors	64,229		203,102		11,158,880	

=== 1988 Sri Lankan Presidential Election ===
Party	Monaragala		Monaragala Electoral District		Sri Lanka	
Party	Votes	%	Votes	%	Votes	%
UNP	1,781	54.68%	16,872	63.21%	2,569,199	50.43%
SLFP	1,366	41.94%	9,123	34.18%	2,289,857	44.95%
SLMP	110	3.38%	697	2.61%	235,701	4.63%
Valid Votes	3,257	96.56%	26,692	96.91%	5,094,754	98.24%
Rejected Votes	116	3.44%	851	3.09%	91,499	1.76%
Total Polled	3,373	6.51%	27,543	16.99%	5,186,256	55.87%
Registered Electors	51,823		162,135		9,283,143	

=== 1982 Sri Lankan Presidential Election ===
Party	Monaragala		Monaragala Electoral District		Sri Lanka	
Party	Votes	%	Votes	%	Votes	%
UNP	16,836	47.93%	51,264	49.38%	3,450,815	52.93%
SLFP	16,060	45.72%	44,115	42.49%	2,546,348	39.05%
JVP	1,721	4.90%	7,171	6.91%	273,428	4.19%
Other Parties (with < 1%)	509	1.45%	1,271	1.22%	249,460	3.83%
Valid Votes	35,126	98.52%	103,821	98.53%	6,520,156	98.78%
Rejected Votes	526	1.48%	1,553	1.47%	80,470	1.22%
Total Polled	35,652	85.55%	105,374	82.45%	6,600,626	80.15%
Registered Electors	41,675		127,799		8,235,358	

== Parliamentary Election Results ==
=== Summary ===
In four of the seven parliamentary elections listed below (1989–2015), the party that won the most votes in Monaragala also won the most votes nationally.

Year	Monaragala	Monaragala Electoral District	MAE %	Sri Lanka	MAE %
2015	UPFA	UPFA	0.97%	UNP	5.12%
2010	UPFA	UPFA	1.11%	UPFA	11.47%
2004	UPFA	UPFA	0.70%	UPFA	7.14%
2001	PA	PA	2.53%	UNP	5.68%
2000	PA	PA	3.41%	PA	4.66%
1994	PA	PA	3.87%	PA	4.55%
1989	SLFP	UNP	9.70%	UNP	11.41%
Matches/Mean MAE	4/7	5/7	3.18%	7/7	7.15%

=== 2015 Sri Lankan Parliamentary Election ===
Party	Monaragala		Monaragala Electoral District		Sri Lanka	
Party	Votes	%	Votes	%	Votes	%
UPFA	39,432	51.91%	138,136	52.53%	4,732,664	42.48%
UNP	32,972	43.41%	110,372	41.97%	5,098,916	45.77%
JVP	3,278	4.32%	13,626	5.18%	544,154	4.88%
Other Parties (with < 1%)	276	0.36%	854	0.32%	59,382	0.53%
Valid Votes	75,958	95.98%	262,988	96.59%	11,140,333	95.35%
Rejected Votes	3,181	4.02%	9,291	3.41%	516,926	4.42%
Total Polled	79,139	73.50%	272,279	80.13%	11,684,111	77.66%
Registered Electors	107,678		339,797		15,044,490	

=== 2010 Sri Lankan Parliamentary Election ===
Party	Monaragala		Monaragala Electoral District		Sri Lanka	
Party	Votes	%	Votes	%	Votes	%
UPFA	32,315	74.58%	120,634	75.64%	4,846,388	60.38%
UNP	8,500	19.62%	28,892	18.12%	2,357,057	29.37%
DNA	2,168	5.00%	9,018	5.65%	441,251	5.50%
Other Parties (with < 1%)	344	0.79%	947	0.59%	34,793	0.43%
Valid Votes	43,327	93.30%	159,491	94.02%	8,026,322	96.03%
Rejected Votes	3,112	6.70%	10,149	5.98%	581,465	6.96%
Total Polled	46,439	48.18%	169,640	54.04%	8,358,246	59.29%
Registered Electors	96,386		313,931		14,097,690	

=== 2004 Sri Lankan Parliamentary Election ===
Party	Monaragala		Monaragala Electoral District		Sri Lanka	
Party	Votes	%	Votes	%	Votes	%
UPFA	34,503	60.54%	117,456	61.14%	4,223,126	45.70%
UNP	21,593	37.89%	71,067	36.99%	3,486,792	37.73%
JHU	586	1.03%	2,675	1.39%	552,723	5.98%
Other Parties (with < 1%)	314	0.55%	915	0.48%	58,082	0.63%
Valid Votes	56,996	93.23%	192,113	93.75%	9,241,931	94.52%
Rejected Votes	4,142	6.77%	12,816	6.25%	534,452	5.47%
Total Polled	61,138	73.49%	204,929	78.00%	9,777,821	75.74%
Registered Electors	83,194		262,742		12,909,631	

=== 2001 Sri Lankan Parliamentary Election ===
Party	Monaragala		Monaragala Electoral District		Sri Lanka	
Party	Votes	%	Votes	%	Votes	%
PA	26,591	47.39%	81,805	43.67%	3,330,815	37.19%
UNP	23,313	41.55%	80,549	43.00%	4,086,026	45.62%
JVP	5,230	9.32%	21,987	11.74%	815,353	9.10%
NLF	571	1.02%	1,745	0.93%	45,901	0.51%
Other Parties (with < 1%)	405	0.72%	1,247	0.67%	78,691	0.88%
Valid Votes	56,110	91.26%	187,333	92.30%	8,955,844	94.77%
Rejected Votes	5,376	8.74%	15,638	7.70%	494,009	5.23%
Total Polled	61,486	78.79%	202,971	82.08%	9,449,878	76.03%
Registered Electors	78,033		247,280		12,428,762	

=== 2000 Sri Lankan Parliamentary Election ===
Party	Monaragala		Monaragala Electoral District		Sri Lanka	
Party	Votes	%	Votes	%	Votes	%
PA	29,668	53.87%	91,404	49.69%	3,899,329	45.33%
UNP	21,063	38.24%	75,900	41.27%	3,451,765	40.12%
JVP	3,228	5.86%	13,159	7.15%	518,725	6.03%
Other Parties (with < 1%)	1,116	2.03%	3,468	1.89%	263,775	3.07%
Valid Votes	55,075	N/A	183,931	N/A	8,602,617	N/A

=== 1994 Sri Lankan Parliamentary Election ===
Party	Monaragala		Monaragala Electoral District		Sri Lanka	
Party	Votes	%	Votes	%	Votes	%
PA	27,459	55.40%	77,955	50.40%	3,887,805	48.94%
UNP	20,277	40.91%	67,753	43.81%	3,498,370	44.04%
IND4	1,215	2.45%	6,592	4.26%	6,592	0.08%
Other Parties (with < 1%)	610	1.23%	2,363	1.53%	155,517	1.96%
Valid Votes	49,561	90.29%	154,663	90.46%	7,943,688	95.20%
Rejected Votes	5,328	9.71%	16,305	9.54%	400,395	4.80%
Total Polled	54,889	85.46%	170,968	84.15%	8,344,095	74.75%
Registered Electors	64,229		203,178		11,163,064	

=== 1989 Sri Lankan Parliamentary Election ===
Party	Monaragala		Monaragala Electoral District		Sri Lanka	
Party	Votes	%	Votes	%	Votes	%
SLFP	16,700	53.35%	38,640	43.73%	1,785,369	31.90%
UNP	13,141	41.98%	46,313	52.42%	2,838,005	50.71%
USA	990	3.16%	2,149	2.43%	141,983	2.54%
Other Parties (with < 1%)	471	1.50%	1,250	1.41%	304,781	5.45%
Valid Votes	31,302	87.69%	88,352	87.76%	5,596,468	93.87%
Rejected Votes	4,396	12.31%	12,317	12.24%	365,563	6.13%
Total Polled	35,698	69.78%	100,669	62.17%	5,962,031	63.60%
Registered Electors	51,157		161,927		9,374,164	

== Demographics ==
=== Ethnicity ===
The Monaragala Polling Division has a Sinhalese majority (91.3%). In comparison, the Monaragala Electoral District (which contains the Monaragala Polling Division) has a Sinhalese majority (94.9%).

Ethnicity in Monaragala
1. Sinhalese (91.3%)
2. Sri Lankan Tamil (4.00%)
3. Indian Tamil (3.20%)
4. Moor (1.50%)
5. Other (0.10%)

=== Religion ===
The Monaragala Polling Division has a Buddhist majority (91.0%). In comparison, the Monaragala Electoral District (which contains the Monaragala Polling Division) has a Buddhist majority (94.6%).

Religion in Monaragala
1. Buddhist (91.0%)
2. Hindu (6.70%)
3. Muslim (1.50%)
4. Other (0.80%)
