= Kumarasiri Rathnayake =

Sri Lankan politician

Hon. Kumarasiri Rathnayake
- කුමාරසිරි රත්නායක குமாரசிறி ரத்நாயக்க

Member of the Parliament of Sri Lanka
- Incumbent
- Assumed office 2020
- Constituency: Monaragala District

Member of the Uva Provincial Council
- In office 2004–2019
- Constituency: Monaragala District

Personal details
- Born: 15 January 1967 (age 59)
- Party: Sri Lanka Podujana Peramuna
- Other political affiliations: Sri Lanka People's Freedom Alliance
- Education: University of Ruhuna
- Occupation: Teacher

Rathnayake Mudiyanselage Kumarasiri Rathnayake (born 15 January 1967) is a Sri Lankan teacher, politician, former provincial minister and Member of Parliament.

Rathnayake was born on 15 January 1967. He has a BSc degree from the University of Ruhuna. He is a teacher.

Rathnayake was a member of Monaragala Divisional Council and Uva Provincial Council where he held a provincial ministerial portfolio for two terms. He contested the 2020 parliamentary election as a Sri Lanka People's Freedom Alliance electoral alliance candidate in Monaragala District and was elected to the Parliament of Sri Lanka.

Electoral history of Kumarasiri Rathnayake
Election	Constituency	Party	Alliance	Votes	Result
2004 provincial	Monaragala District		United People's Freedom Alliance	17,146	Elected
2009 provincial	Monaragala District		United People's Freedom Alliance	44,623	Elected
2014 provincial	Monaragala District		United People's Freedom Alliance	59,285	Elected
2020 parliamentary	Monaragala District	Sri Lanka Podujana Peramuna	Sri Lanka People's Freedom Alliance	91,530	Elected
