= R. M. Jayawardena =

Sri Lankan politician

R. M. Jayawardena is a Sri Lankan politician. He was elected to the Sri Lankan Parliament from Monaragala Electoral District as a member of the National People's Power. He is the Deputy Minister of Trade, Commerce, Food Security and Co-operative Development.
