= Wellawaya Polling Division =

Wellawaya
- Polling Division
- Interactive map of Wellawaya
- Coordinates: 6.565220°N 81.181471°E
- Country: Sri Lanka
- Province: Uva Province, Sri Lanka
- Electoral District: Monaragala Electoral District

Area
  - Total: 2,557.25 km^{2} (987.36 sq mi)

Population (2012)
  - Total: 199,947
  - Density: 78/km^{2} (200/sq mi)
- ISO 3166 code: EC-20C

The Wellawaya Polling Division is a Polling Division in the Monaragala Electoral District, in the Uva Province, Sri Lanka.

== Presidential Election Results ==
=== Summary ===
The winner of Wellawaya has matched the final country result 7 out of 8 times. Hence, Wellawaya is a Strong Bellwether for Presidential Elections.

Year	Wellawaya	Monaragala Electoral District	MAE %	Sri Lanka	MAE %
2019	SLPP	SLPP	2.34%	SLPP	14.68%
2015	UPFA	UPFA	1.38%	NDF	15.06%
2010	UPFA	UPFA	1.06%	UPFA	11.93%
2005	UPFA	UPFA	0.28%	UPFA	6.90%
1999	PA	PA	0.93%	PA	1.41%
1994	PA	PA	0.54%	PA	0.71%
1988	UNP	UNP	7.63%	UNP	18.85%
1982	UNP	UNP	2.30%	UNP	5.71%
Matches/Mean MAE	7/8	7/8	2.06%	8/8	9.41%

=== 2019 Sri Lankan Presidential Election ===
Party	Wellawaya		Monaragala Electoral District		Sri Lanka	
Party	Votes	%	Votes	%	Votes	%
SLPP	91,349	67.76%	208,814	65.34%	6,924,255	52.25%
NDF	35,557	26.37%	92,539	28.95%	5,564,239	41.99%
NMPP	5,094	3.78%	11,235	3.52%	418,553	3.16%
Other Parties (with < 1%)	2,818	2.09%	7,016	2.20%	345,452	2.61%
Valid Votes	134,818	99.24%	319,604	99.07%	13,252,499	98.99%
Rejected Votes	1,034	0.76%	3,000	0.93%	135,452	1.01%
Total Polled	135,852	87.96%	322,604	88.02%	13,387,951	83.71%
Registered Electors	154,442		366,524		15,992,568	

=== 2015 Sri Lankan Presidential Election ===
Party	Wellawaya		Monaragala Electoral District		Sri Lanka	
Party	Votes	%	Votes	%	Votes	%
UPFA	76,069	62.87%	172,745	61.45%	5,768,090	47.58%
NDF	43,678	36.10%	105,276	37.45%	6,217,162	51.28%
Other Parties (with < 1%)	1,241	1.03%	3,095	1.10%	138,200	1.14%
Valid Votes	120,988	98.90%	281,116	98.79%	12,123,452	98.85%
Rejected Votes	1,349	1.10%	3,449	1.21%	140,925	1.15%
Total Polled	122,337	82.04%	284,565	79.90%	12,264,377	78.69%
Registered Electors	149,116		356,146		15,585,942	

=== 2010 Sri Lankan Presidential Election ===
Party	Wellawaya		Monaragala Electoral District		Sri Lanka	
Party	Votes	%	Votes	%	Votes	%
UPFA	68,310	70.12%	158,435	69.01%	6,015,934	57.88%
NDF	27,369	28.10%	66,803	29.10%	4,173,185	40.15%
Other Parties (with < 1%)	1,735	1.78%	4,346	1.89%	204,494	1.97%
Valid Votes	97,414	99.20%	229,584	99.02%	10,393,613	99.03%
Rejected Votes	790	0.80%	2,272	0.98%	101,838	0.97%
Total Polled	98,204	75.80%	231,856	73.94%	10,495,451	66.70%
Registered Electors	129,564		313,554		15,734,587	

=== 2005 Sri Lankan Presidential Election ===
Party	Wellawaya		Monaragala Electoral District		Sri Lanka	
Party	Votes	%	Votes	%	Votes	%
UPFA	54,066	57.26%	126,094	56.94%	4,887,152	50.29%
UNP	39,117	41.43%	92,244	41.65%	4,706,366	48.43%
Other Parties (with < 1%)	1,236	1.31%	3,112	1.41%	123,521	1.27%
Valid Votes	94,419	98.89%	221,450	98.82%	9,717,039	98.88%
Rejected Votes	1,055	1.11%	2,636	1.18%	109,869	1.12%
Total Polled	95,474	79.89%	224,086	78.54%	9,826,908	69.51%
Registered Electors	119,506		285,327		14,136,979	

=== 1999 Sri Lankan Presidential Election ===
Party	Wellawaya		Monaragala Electoral District		Sri Lanka	
Party	Votes	%	Votes	%	Votes	%
PA	37,950	49.74%	92,049	51.07%	4,312,157	51.12%
UNP	31,534	41.33%	73,695	40.89%	3,602,748	42.71%
JVP	5,279	6.92%	10,456	5.80%	343,927	4.08%
Other Parties (with < 1%)	1,538	2.02%	4,045	2.24%	176,679	2.09%
Valid Votes	76,301	98.07%	180,245	97.74%	8,435,754	97.69%
Rejected Votes	1,503	1.93%	4,161	2.26%	199,536	2.31%
Total Polled	77,804	79.04%	184,406	78.39%	8,635,290	72.17%
Registered Electors	98,437		235,252		11,965,536	

=== 1994 Sri Lankan Presidential Election ===
Party	Wellawaya		Monaragala Electoral District		Sri Lanka	
Party	Votes	%	Votes	%	Votes	%
PA	38,050	62.76%	96,620	63.20%	4,709,205	62.28%
UNP	21,090	34.79%	52,026	34.03%	2,715,283	35.91%
Other Parties (with < 1%)	1,483	2.45%	4,223	2.76%	137,040	1.81%
Valid Votes	60,623	97.50%	152,869	97.46%	7,561,526	98.03%
Rejected Votes	1,553	2.50%	3,977	2.54%	151,706	1.97%
Total Polled	62,176	73.75%	156,846	77.23%	7,713,232	69.12%
Registered Electors	84,310		203,102		11,158,880	

=== 1988 Sri Lankan Presidential Election ===
Party	Wellawaya		Monaragala Electoral District		Sri Lanka	
Party	Votes	%	Votes	%	Votes	%
UNP	5,895	71.07%	16,872	63.21%	2,569,199	50.43%
SLFP	2,188	26.38%	9,123	34.18%	2,289,857	44.95%
SLMP	212	2.56%	697	2.61%	235,701	4.63%
Valid Votes	8,295	97.75%	26,692	96.91%	5,094,754	98.24%
Rejected Votes	191	2.25%	851	3.09%	91,499	1.76%
Total Polled	8,486	12.66%	27,543	16.99%	5,186,256	55.87%
Registered Electors	67,011		162,135		9,283,143	

=== 1982 Sri Lankan Presidential Election ===
Party	Wellawaya		Monaragala Electoral District		Sri Lanka	
Party	Votes	%	Votes	%	Votes	%
UNP	16,874	45.36%	51,264	49.38%	3,450,815	52.93%
SLFP	15,797	42.47%	44,115	42.49%	2,546,348	39.05%
JVP	4,225	11.36%	7,171	6.91%	273,428	4.19%
Other Parties (with < 1%)	304	0.82%	1,271	1.22%	249,460	3.83%
Valid Votes	37,200	98.51%	103,821	98.53%	6,520,156	98.78%
Rejected Votes	563	1.49%	1,553	1.47%	80,470	1.22%
Total Polled	37,763	77.09%	105,374	82.45%	6,600,626	80.15%
Registered Electors	48,988		127,799		8,235,358	

== Parliamentary Election Results ==
=== Summary ===
The winner of Wellawaya has matched the final country result 6 out of 7 times. Hence, Wellawaya is a Strong Bellwether for Parliamentary Elections.

Year	Wellawaya	Monaragala Electoral District	MAE %	Sri Lanka	MAE %
2015	UPFA	UPFA	2.55%	UNP	8.44%
2010	UPFA	UPFA	0.86%	UPFA	11.94%
2004	UPFA	UPFA	1.25%	UPFA	8.66%
2001	UNP	PA	1.21%	UNP	3.24%
2000	PA	PA	2.04%	PA	2.04%
1994	PA	PA	1.48%	PA	0.73%
1989	UNP	UNP	4.73%	UNP	6.21%
Matches/Mean MAE	6/7	5/7	2.02%	7/7	5.89%

=== 2015 Sri Lankan Parliamentary Election ===
Party	Wellawaya		Monaragala Electoral District		Sri Lanka	
Party	Votes	%	Votes	%	Votes	%
UPFA	61,527	54.99%	138,136	52.53%	4,732,664	42.48%
UNP	43,677	39.03%	110,372	41.97%	5,098,916	45.77%
JVP	6,378	5.70%	13,626	5.18%	544,154	4.88%
Other Parties (with < 1%)	312	0.28%	854	0.32%	59,382	0.53%
Valid Votes	111,894	97.05%	262,988	96.59%	11,140,333	95.35%
Rejected Votes	3,405	2.95%	9,291	3.41%	516,926	4.42%
Total Polled	115,299	77.32%	272,279	80.13%	11,684,111	77.66%
Registered Electors	149,116		339,797		15,044,490	

=== 2010 Sri Lankan Parliamentary Election ===
Party	Wellawaya		Monaragala Electoral District		Sri Lanka	
Party	Votes	%	Votes	%	Votes	%
UPFA	50,073	74.59%	120,634	75.64%	4,846,388	60.38%
UNP	12,199	18.17%	28,892	18.12%	2,357,057	29.37%
DNA	4,507	6.71%	9,018	5.65%	441,251	5.50%
Other Parties (with < 1%)	348	0.52%	947	0.59%	34,793	0.43%
Valid Votes	67,127	94.78%	159,491	94.02%	8,026,322	96.03%
Rejected Votes	3,694	5.22%	10,149	5.98%	581,465	6.96%
Total Polled	70,821	54.66%	169,640	54.04%	8,358,246	59.29%
Registered Electors	129,564		313,931		14,097,690	

=== 2004 Sri Lankan Parliamentary Election ===
Party	Wellawaya		Monaragala Electoral District		Sri Lanka	
Party	Votes	%	Votes	%	Votes	%
UPFA	51,137	62.21%	117,456	61.14%	4,223,126	45.70%
UNP	29,102	35.40%	71,067	36.99%	3,486,792	37.73%
JHU	1,618	1.97%	2,675	1.39%	552,723	5.98%
Other Parties (with < 1%)	348	0.42%	915	0.48%	58,082	0.63%
Valid Votes	82,205	93.95%	192,113	93.75%	9,241,931	94.52%
Rejected Votes	5,296	6.05%	12,816	6.25%	534,452	5.47%
Total Polled	87,501	77.02%	204,929	78.00%	9,777,821	75.74%
Registered Electors	113,614		262,742		12,909,631	

=== 2001 Sri Lankan Parliamentary Election ===
Party	Wellawaya		Monaragala Electoral District		Sri Lanka	
Party	Votes	%	Votes	%	Votes	%
UNP	34,428	43.08%	80,549	43.00%	4,086,026	45.62%
PA	33,230	41.58%	81,805	43.67%	3,330,815	37.19%
JVP	11,148	13.95%	21,987	11.74%	815,353	9.10%
Other Parties (with < 1%)	1,114	1.39%	2,992	1.60%	124,592	1.39%
Valid Votes	79,920	92.91%	187,333	92.30%	8,955,844	94.77%
Rejected Votes	6,103	7.09%	15,638	7.70%	494,009	5.23%
Total Polled	86,023	80.82%	202,971	82.08%	9,449,878	76.03%
Registered Electors	106,437		247,280		12,428,762	

=== 2000 Sri Lankan Parliamentary Election ===
Party	Wellawaya		Monaragala Electoral District		Sri Lanka	
Party	Votes	%	Votes	%	Votes	%
PA	36,697	47.07%	91,404	49.69%	3,899,329	45.33%
UNP	33,390	42.83%	75,900	41.27%	3,451,765	40.12%
JVP	6,581	8.44%	13,159	7.15%	518,725	6.03%
Other Parties (with < 1%)	1,299	1.67%	3,468	1.89%	263,775	3.07%
Valid Votes	77,967	N/A	183,931	N/A	8,602,617	N/A

=== 1994 Sri Lankan Parliamentary Election ===
Party	Wellawaya		Monaragala Electoral District		Sri Lanka	
Party	Votes	%	Votes	%	Votes	%
PA	29,989	47.75%	77,955	50.40%	3,887,805	48.94%
UNP	27,463	43.73%	67,753	43.81%	3,498,370	44.04%
IND4	4,220	6.72%	6,592	4.26%	6,592	0.08%
SLPF	1,000	1.59%	1,896	1.23%	90,078	1.13%
Other Parties (with < 1%)	129	0.21%	467	0.30%	65,439	0.82%
Valid Votes	62,801	90.27%	154,663	90.46%	7,943,688	95.20%
Rejected Votes	6,766	9.73%	16,305	9.54%	400,395	4.80%
Total Polled	69,567	82.51%	170,968	84.15%	8,344,095	74.75%
Registered Electors	84,310		203,178		11,163,064	

=== 1989 Sri Lankan Parliamentary Election ===
Party	Wellawaya		Monaragala Electoral District		Sri Lanka	
Party	Votes	%	Votes	%	Votes	%
UNP	16,136	57.84%	46,313	52.42%	2,838,005	50.71%
SLFP	11,018	39.50%	38,640	43.73%	1,785,369	31.90%
Other Parties (with < 1%)	417	1.49%	1,250	1.41%	304,781	5.45%
USA	325	1.17%	2,149	2.43%	141,983	2.54%
Valid Votes	27,896	87.75%	88,352	87.76%	5,596,468	93.87%
Rejected Votes	3,896	12.25%	12,317	12.24%	365,563	6.13%
Total Polled	31,792	47.70%	100,669	62.17%	5,962,031	63.60%
Registered Electors	66,645		161,927		9,374,164	

== Demographics ==
=== Ethnicity ===
The Wellawaya Polling Division has a Sinhalese majority (98.3%) . In comparison, the Monaragala Electoral District (which contains the Wellawaya Polling Division) has a Sinhalese majority (94.9%)

Ethnicity in Wellawaya
1. Sinhalese (98.3%)
2. Other (1.70%)

=== Religion ===
The Wellawaya Polling Division has a Buddhist majority (98.0%) . In comparison, the Monaragala Electoral District (which contains the Wellawaya Polling Division) has a Buddhist majority (94.6%)

Religion in Wellawaya
1. Buddhist (98.0%)
2. Other (2.00%)
