= Sumedha Jayasena =

Sri Lankan politician

Hon. Sumedha Jayasena MP

Minister of Women's Affairs
- In office 19 October 2000 – 19 November 2005

Minister of Women Affairs & Social Welfare
- In office 23 November 2005 – 23 April 2010

Minister of Parliamentary Affairs
- In office 23 April 2010 – 12 January 2015

Deputy Minister of Sustainable Development and Wildlife
- In office 9 September 2015 – 2 May 2018

Member of Parliament for Monaragala District
- In office 12 November 1994 – 12 August 2020

Personal details
- Born: July 29, 1952 (age 73)
- Party: Sri Lanka Freedom Party
- Other political affiliations: United People's Freedom Alliance

Sumedha Gunawathie Jayasena (සුමේධා ගුණවතී ජයසේන, born July 29, 1952) was a Sri Lankan politician who has served as a member of the Parliament of Sri Lanka and as a government cabinet minister. After the tragic murder of her husband, Balage Jayasena De Silva, she was elected to take his place in Parliament.

Throughout her career, Sumedha G. Jayasena has held various cabinet ministerial positions and has been dedicated to serving her constituency of Monaragala. She played a role in the post-tsunami rehabilitation and rebuilding efforts in 2004 as the Minister of Social Services.

== Political career ==
- 1989-1994 Member of Parliament Monaragala District
- 1994-1999 Deputy Minister of Buddhist Affairs
- 1999-2005 Minister of Social Services
- 2005-2010 Minister of Women's Affairs/Empowerment
- 2010–2015 Minister of Parliamentary Affairs
