= Ruwan Wijeweera =

Sri Lankan politician

Ruwan Wijeweera is a Sri Lankan politician. He was elected to the Sri Lankan Parliament from Monaragala Electoral District as a member of the National People's Power.
