= R. M. Gunasekera =

Sri Lankan politician

Ratnayake Mudiyanselage Gunasekera was a Sri Lanka member of parliament in 1960, from Bibile.

Born in the village of Medagam Pattuwa in Bibile, his father was the Ratnayake Mudiyanselage Kiribanda was the Village Headman. Gunasekera was elected to parliament from the United National Party in the March 1960 general election from Bibile, but lost his seat in the July 1960 general election to D. M. Gunasekera. He was shot dead by an unknown assassin and his brother Dharmadasa Banda succeed him as the United National Party organizer for Bibile. His son Ranjith Madduma Bandara served as a member of the parliament.
