= W. H. M. Dharmasena =

Sri Lankan politician (born 1955)

Hon. W. H. M. Dharmasena MP
- විජේසිංහ ධර්මසේන விஜேசிங்க தர்மசேனா

Member of the Parliament of Sri Lanka
- Incumbent
- Assumed office 2020
- Constituency: Monaragala District

Member of the Uva Provincial Council
- In office 2014–2019
- Constituency: Monaragala District

Personal details
- Born: 7 July 1955 (age 70)
- Party: United National Party
- Other political affiliations: Samagi Jana Balawegaya

Wijesinghe Herath Mudiyanselage Dharmasena (born 7 July 1955), sometimes H. M. Dharmasena, is a Sri Lankan politician, former provincial councillor and now Member of Parliament.

Dharmasena was born on 7 July 1955 in Okkampitiya in Monaragala District. He is a businessman.

Dharmasena was a member of Buttala Divisional Council and Uva Provincial Council. He contested the 2020 parliamentary election as a Samagi Jana Balawegaya electoral alliance candidate in Monaragala District and was elected to the Parliament of Sri Lanka. He was re-elected at the 2024 parliamentary election.

Electoral history of W. H. M. Dharmasena
Election	Constituency	Party	Alliance	Votes	Result
2014 provincial	Monaragala District	United National Party		18,400	Elected
2020 parliamentary	Monaragala District	United National Party	Samagi Jana Balawegaya	20,662	Elected
2024 parliamentary	Monaragala District	United National Party	Samagi Jana Balawegaya	20,171	Elected
