= D. M. Gunasekera =

Ceylonese politician (1934–2016)

Dissanayake Mudiyanselage Gunasekera (21 June 1934 – 23 January 2016) was a Ceylonese politician. He was a member of parliament in 1960 to 1964 from Bibile.

Gunasekera contested the March 1960 general election from the Sri Lanka Freedom Party in Bibile and lost to R. M. Gunasekera. He then contested the July 1960 general election and won against R. M. Gunasekera who was later shot dead in 1964 by an unknown gunmen. Gunasekera later served as Sri Lanka Freedom Party chief organizer in Bibile. His son Brigadier Uditha Bandara, served as the Brigade Commander of the Commando Brigade of the Sri Lanka Army.
