= Bibile (name) =

Bibile (Sinhala: බිබිලේ, romanized: Bibilē) is a Sinhalese given name and a surname. Notable people with the name include:

== Given name ==
- Bibile Fonseka, Ceylonese politician

== Surname ==
- Sanoja Bibile (born 1967), Sri Lankan actress
- Senaka Bibile (1920–1977), Sri Lankan pharmacologist and medical education pioneer

== See also ==
- Bibile (disambiguation)
