= Bibile Polling Division =

Bibile
- Polling Division
- Interactive map of Bibile
- Coordinates: 7.152790°N 81.377575°E
- Country: Sri Lanka
- Province: Uva Province, Sri Lanka
- Electoral District: Monaragala Electoral District

Area
  - Total: 1,339.63 km^{2} (517.23 sq mi)

Population (2012)
  - Total: 107,448
  - Density: 80/km^{2} (210/sq mi)
- ISO 3166 code: EC-20A

The Bibile Polling Division is a Polling Division in the Monaragala Electoral District, in the Uva Province, Sri Lanka.

== Presidential Election Results ==
=== Summary ===
The winner of Bibile has matched the final country result 7 out of 8 times. Hence, Bibile is a Bellwether for Presidential Elections.

| Year | Bibile | Monaragala Electoral District | MAE % | Sri Lanka | MAE % |
|---|---|---|---|---|---|
| 2019 | SLPP | SLPP | 2.14% | SLPP | 10.20% |
| 2015 | UPFA | UPFA | 0.62% | NDF | 13.12% |
| 2010 | UPFA | UPFA | 1.63% | UPFA | 9.29% |
| 2005 | UPFA | UPFA | 1.29% | UPFA | 5.35% |
| 1999 | PA | PA | 1.89% | PA | 1.19% |
| 1994 | PA | PA | 1.46% | PA | 0.77% |
| 1988 | UNP | UNP | 2.46% | UNP | 8.96% |
| 1982 | UNP | UNP | 4.73% | UNP | 1.49% |
| Matches/Mean MAE | 7/8 | 7/8 | 2.03% | 8/8 | 6.30% |

=== 2019 Sri Lankan Presidential Election ===
| Party | Bibile | | Monaragala Electoral District | | Sri Lanka | |
| Party | Votes | % | Votes | % | Votes | % |
|---|---|---|---|---|---|---|
| SLPP | 44,351 | 63.05% | 208,814 | 65.34% | 6,924,255 | 52.25% |
| NDF | 21,914 | 31.15% | 92,539 | 28.95% | 5,564,239 | 41.99% |
| NMPP | 2,264 | 3.22% | 11,235 | 3.52% | 418,553 | 3.16% |
| Other Parties (with < 1%) | 1,811 | 2.57% | 7,016 | 2.20% | 345,452 | 2.61% |
| Valid Votes | 70,340 | 99.19% | 319,604 | 99.07% | 13,252,499 | 98.99% |
| Rejected Votes | 573 | 0.81% | 3,000 | 0.93% | 135,452 | 1.01% |
| Total Polled | 70,913 | 86.84% | 322,604 | 88.02% | 13,387,951 | 83.71% |
| Registered Electors | 81,662 | | 366,524 | | 15,992,568 | |

=== 2015 Sri Lankan Presidential Election ===
| Party | Bibile | | Monaragala Electoral District | | Sri Lanka | |
| Party | Votes | % | Votes | % | Votes | % |
|---|---|---|---|---|---|---|
| UPFA | 37,987 | 60.72% | 172,745 | 61.45% | 5,768,090 | 47.58% |
| NDF | 23,704 | 37.89% | 105,276 | 37.45% | 6,217,162 | 51.28% |
| Other Parties (with < 1%) | 874 | 1.40% | 3,095 | 1.10% | 138,200 | 1.14% |
| Valid Votes | 62,565 | 98.78% | 281,116 | 98.79% | 12,123,452 | 98.85% |
| Rejected Votes | 775 | 1.22% | 3,449 | 1.21% | 140,925 | 1.15% |
| Total Polled | 63,340 | 76.31% | 284,565 | 79.90% | 12,264,377 | 78.69% |
| Registered Electors | 83,003 | | 356,146 | | 15,585,942 | |

=== 2010 Sri Lankan Presidential Election ===
| Party | Bibile | | Monaragala Electoral District | | Sri Lanka | |
| Party | Votes | % | Votes | % | Votes | % |
|---|---|---|---|---|---|---|
| UPFA | 34,523 | 67.22% | 158,435 | 69.01% | 6,015,934 | 57.88% |
| NDF | 15,649 | 30.47% | 66,803 | 29.10% | 4,173,185 | 40.15% |
| Other Parties (with < 1%) | 1,185 | 2.31% | 4,346 | 1.89% | 204,494 | 1.97% |
| Valid Votes | 51,357 | 98.95% | 229,584 | 99.02% | 10,393,613 | 99.03% |
| Rejected Votes | 544 | 1.05% | 2,272 | 0.98% | 101,838 | 0.97% |
| Total Polled | 51,901 | 69.49% | 231,856 | 73.94% | 10,495,451 | 66.70% |
| Registered Electors | 74,692 | | 313,554 | | 15,734,587 | |

=== 2005 Sri Lankan Presidential Election ===
| Party | Bibile | | Monaragala Electoral District | | Sri Lanka | |
| Party | Votes | % | Votes | % | Votes | % |
|---|---|---|---|---|---|---|
| UPFA | 28,663 | 55.54% | 126,094 | 56.94% | 4,887,152 | 50.29% |
| UNP | 22,103 | 42.83% | 92,244 | 41.65% | 4,706,366 | 48.43% |
| Other Parties (with < 1%) | 846 | 1.64% | 3,112 | 1.41% | 123,521 | 1.27% |
| Valid Votes | 51,612 | 98.91% | 221,450 | 98.82% | 9,717,039 | 98.88% |
| Rejected Votes | 567 | 1.09% | 2,636 | 1.18% | 109,869 | 1.12% |
| Total Polled | 52,179 | 76.00% | 224,086 | 78.54% | 9,826,908 | 69.51% |
| Registered Electors | 68,660 | | 285,327 | | 14,136,979 | |

=== 1999 Sri Lankan Presidential Election ===
| Party | Bibile | | Monaragala Electoral District | | Sri Lanka | |
| Party | Votes | % | Votes | % | Votes | % |
|---|---|---|---|---|---|---|
| PA | 21,890 | 49.11% | 92,049 | 51.07% | 4,312,157 | 51.12% |
| UNP | 19,156 | 42.98% | 73,695 | 40.89% | 3,602,748 | 42.71% |
| JVP | 2,337 | 5.24% | 10,456 | 5.80% | 343,927 | 4.08% |
| Other Parties (with < 1%) | 1,191 | 2.67% | 4,045 | 2.24% | 176,679 | 2.09% |
| Valid Votes | 44,574 | 97.75% | 180,245 | 97.74% | 8,435,754 | 97.69% |
| Rejected Votes | 1,028 | 2.25% | 4,161 | 2.26% | 199,536 | 2.31% |
| Total Polled | 45,602 | 77.55% | 184,406 | 78.39% | 8,635,290 | 72.17% |
| Registered Electors | 58,803 | | 235,252 | | 11,965,536 | |

=== 1994 Sri Lankan Presidential Election ===
| Party | Bibile | | Monaragala Electoral District | | Sri Lanka | |
| Party | Votes | % | Votes | % | Votes | % |
|---|---|---|---|---|---|---|
| PA | 24,271 | 61.50% | 96,620 | 63.20% | 4,709,205 | 62.28% |
| UNP | 13,867 | 35.14% | 52,026 | 34.03% | 2,715,283 | 35.91% |
| Ind 2 | 674 | 1.71% | 1,966 | 1.29% | 58,888 | 0.78% |
| Other Parties (with < 1%) | 655 | 1.66% | 2,257 | 1.48% | 78,152 | 1.03% |
| Valid Votes | 39,467 | 97.70% | 152,869 | 97.46% | 7,561,526 | 98.03% |
| Rejected Votes | 928 | 2.30% | 3,977 | 2.54% | 151,706 | 1.97% |
| Total Polled | 40,395 | 79.44% | 156,846 | 77.23% | 7,713,232 | 69.12% |
| Registered Electors | 50,852 | | 203,102 | | 11,158,880 | |

=== 1988 Sri Lankan Presidential Election ===
| Party | Bibile | | Monaragala Electoral District | | Sri Lanka | |
| Party | Votes | % | Votes | % | Votes | % |
|---|---|---|---|---|---|---|
| UNP | 9,091 | 60.73% | 16,872 | 63.21% | 2,569,199 | 50.43% |
| SLFP | 5,507 | 36.79% | 9,123 | 34.18% | 2,289,857 | 44.95% |
| SLMP | 371 | 2.48% | 697 | 2.61% | 235,701 | 4.63% |
| Valid Votes | 14,969 | 96.72% | 26,692 | 96.91% | 5,094,754 | 98.24% |
| Rejected Votes | 507 | 3.28% | 851 | 3.09% | 91,499 | 1.76% |
| Total Polled | 15,476 | 35.91% | 27,543 | 16.99% | 5,186,256 | 55.87% |
| Registered Electors | 43,093 | | 162,135 | | 9,283,143 | |

=== 1982 Sri Lankan Presidential Election ===
| Party | Bibile | | Monaragala Electoral District | | Sri Lanka | |
| Party | Votes | % | Votes | % | Votes | % |
|---|---|---|---|---|---|---|
| UNP | 16,821 | 55.59% | 51,264 | 49.38% | 3,450,815 | 52.93% |
| SLFP | 11,820 | 39.06% | 44,115 | 42.49% | 2,546,348 | 39.05% |
| JVP | 1,180 | 3.90% | 7,171 | 6.91% | 273,428 | 4.19% |
| LSSP | 313 | 1.03% | 882 | 0.85% | 58,531 | 0.90% |
| Other Parties (with < 1%) | 126 | 0.42% | 389 | 0.37% | 190,929 | 2.93% |
| Valid Votes | 30,260 | 98.51% | 103,821 | 98.53% | 6,520,156 | 98.78% |
| Rejected Votes | 458 | 1.49% | 1,553 | 1.47% | 80,470 | 1.22% |
| Total Polled | 30,718 | 85.58% | 105,374 | 82.45% | 6,600,626 | 80.15% |
| Registered Electors | 35,895 | | 127,799 | | 8,235,358 | |

== Parliamentary Election Results ==
=== Summary ===
The winner of Bibile has matched the final country result 6 out of 7 times. Hence, Bibile is a Bellwether for Parliamentary Elections.

| Year | Bibile | Monaragala Electoral District | MAE % | Sri Lanka | MAE % |
|---|---|---|---|---|---|
| 2015 | UPFA | UPFA | 1.19% | UNP | 4.90% |
| 2010 | UPFA | UPFA | 2.20% | UPFA | 14.46% |
| 2004 | UPFA | UPFA | 1.75% | UPFA | 7.25% |
| 2001 | UNP | PA | 1.22% | UNP | 2.68% |
| 2000 | PA | PA | 0.84% | PA | 2.68% |
| 1994 | PA | PA | 3.10% | PA | 2.20% |
| 1989 | UNP | UNP | 6.17% | UNP | 5.86% |
| Matches/Mean MAE | 6/7 | 5/7 | 2.35% | 7/7 | 5.72% |

=== 2015 Sri Lankan Parliamentary Election ===
| Party | Bibile | | Monaragala Electoral District | | Sri Lanka | |
| Party | Votes | % | Votes | % | Votes | % |
|---|---|---|---|---|---|---|
| UPFA | 29,867 | 51.63% | 138,136 | 52.53% | 4,732,664 | 42.48% |
| UNP | 25,220 | 43.60% | 110,372 | 41.97% | 5,098,916 | 45.77% |
| JVP | 2,557 | 4.42% | 13,626 | 5.18% | 544,154 | 4.88% |
| Other Parties (with < 1%) | 199 | 0.34% | 854 | 0.32% | 59,382 | 0.53% |
| Valid Votes | 57,843 | 95.95% | 262,988 | 96.59% | 11,140,333 | 95.35% |
| Rejected Votes | 2,442 | 4.05% | 9,291 | 3.41% | 516,926 | 4.42% |
| Total Polled | 60,285 | 72.63% | 272,279 | 80.13% | 11,684,111 | 77.66% |
| Registered Electors | 83,003 | | 339,797 | | 15,044,490 | |

=== 2010 Sri Lankan Parliamentary Election ===
| Party | Bibile | | Monaragala Electoral District | | Sri Lanka | |
| Party | Votes | % | Votes | % | Votes | % |
|---|---|---|---|---|---|---|
| UPFA | 28,575 | 78.15% | 120,634 | 75.64% | 4,846,388 | 60.38% |
| UNP | 6,172 | 16.88% | 28,892 | 18.12% | 2,357,057 | 29.37% |
| DNA | 1,610 | 4.40% | 9,018 | 5.65% | 441,251 | 5.50% |
| Other Parties (with < 1%) | 206 | 0.56% | 947 | 0.59% | 34,793 | 0.43% |
| Valid Votes | 36,563 | 92.80% | 159,491 | 94.02% | 8,026,322 | 96.03% |
| Rejected Votes | 2,837 | 7.20% | 10,149 | 5.98% | 581,465 | 6.96% |
| Total Polled | 39,400 | 52.75% | 169,640 | 54.04% | 8,358,246 | 59.29% |
| Registered Electors | 74,692 | | 313,931 | | 14,097,690 | |

=== 2004 Sri Lankan Parliamentary Election ===
| Party | Bibile | | Monaragala Electoral District | | Sri Lanka | |
| Party | Votes | % | Votes | % | Votes | % |
|---|---|---|---|---|---|---|
| UPFA | 27,149 | 59.63% | 117,456 | 61.14% | 4,223,126 | 45.70% |
| UNP | 17,851 | 39.21% | 71,067 | 36.99% | 3,486,792 | 37.73% |
| Other Parties (with < 1%) | 527 | 1.16% | 3,590 | 1.87% | 610,805 | 6.61% |
| Valid Votes | 45,527 | 93.33% | 192,113 | 93.75% | 9,241,931 | 94.52% |
| Rejected Votes | 3,255 | 6.67% | 12,816 | 6.25% | 534,452 | 5.47% |
| Total Polled | 48,782 | 73.99% | 204,929 | 78.00% | 9,777,821 | 75.74% |
| Registered Electors | 65,934 | | 262,742 | | 12,909,631 | |

=== 2001 Sri Lankan Parliamentary Election ===
| Party | Bibile | | Monaragala Electoral District | | Sri Lanka | |
| Party | Votes | % | Votes | % | Votes | % |
|---|---|---|---|---|---|---|
| UNP | 20,258 | 44.65% | 80,549 | 43.00% | 4,086,026 | 45.62% |
| PA | 19,423 | 42.81% | 81,805 | 43.67% | 3,330,815 | 37.19% |
| JVP | 4,823 | 10.63% | 21,987 | 11.74% | 815,353 | 9.10% |
| NLF | 538 | 1.19% | 1,745 | 0.93% | 45,901 | 0.51% |
| Other Parties (with < 1%) | 329 | 0.73% | 1,247 | 0.67% | 78,691 | 0.88% |
| Valid Votes | 45,371 | 91.80% | 187,333 | 92.30% | 8,955,844 | 94.77% |
| Rejected Votes | 4,053 | 8.20% | 15,638 | 7.70% | 494,009 | 5.23% |
| Total Polled | 49,424 | 78.69% | 202,971 | 82.08% | 9,449,878 | 76.03% |
| Registered Electors | 62,810 | | 247,280 | | 12,428,762 | |

=== 2000 Sri Lankan Parliamentary Election ===
| Party | Bibile | | Monaragala Electoral District | | Sri Lanka | |
| Party | Votes | % | Votes | % | Votes | % |
|---|---|---|---|---|---|---|
| PA | 22,011 | 49.11% | 91,404 | 49.69% | 3,899,329 | 45.33% |
| UNP | 19,022 | 42.44% | 75,900 | 41.27% | 3,451,765 | 40.12% |
| JVP | 2,783 | 6.21% | 13,159 | 7.15% | 518,725 | 6.03% |
| Other Parties (with < 1%) | 1,001 | 2.23% | 3,468 | 1.89% | 263,775 | 3.07% |
| Valid Votes | 44,817 | N/A | 183,931 | N/A | 8,602,617 | N/A |

=== 1994 Sri Lankan Parliamentary Election ===
| Party | Bibile | | Monaragala Electoral District | | Sri Lanka | |
| Party | Votes | % | Votes | % | Votes | % |
|---|---|---|---|---|---|---|
| PA | 18,546 | 47.86% | 77,955 | 50.40% | 3,887,805 | 48.94% |
| UNP | 18,526 | 47.80% | 67,753 | 43.81% | 3,498,370 | 44.04% |
| IND4 | 1,104 | 2.85% | 6,592 | 4.26% | 6,592 | 0.08% |
| SLPF | 422 | 1.09% | 1,896 | 1.23% | 90,078 | 1.13% |
| Other Parties (with < 1%) | 156 | 0.40% | 467 | 0.30% | 65,439 | 0.82% |
| Valid Votes | 38,754 | 90.35% | 154,663 | 90.46% | 7,943,688 | 95.20% |
| Rejected Votes | 4,140 | 9.65% | 16,305 | 9.54% | 400,395 | 4.80% |
| Total Polled | 42,894 | 84.35% | 170,968 | 84.15% | 8,344,095 | 74.75% |
| Registered Electors | 50,852 | | 203,178 | | 11,163,064 | |

=== 1989 Sri Lankan Parliamentary Election ===
| Party | Bibile | | Monaragala Electoral District | | Sri Lanka | |
| Party | Votes | % | Votes | % | Votes | % |
|---|---|---|---|---|---|---|
| UNP | 16,362 | 58.68% | 46,313 | 52.42% | 2,838,005 | 50.71% |
| SLFP | 10,361 | 37.16% | 38,640 | 43.73% | 1,785,369 | 31.90% |
| USA | 815 | 2.92% | 2,149 | 2.43% | 141,983 | 2.54% |
| Other Parties (with < 1%) | 344 | 1.23% | 1,250 | 1.41% | 304,781 | 5.45% |
| Valid Votes | 27,882 | 87.45% | 88,352 | 87.76% | 5,596,468 | 93.87% |
| Rejected Votes | 4,002 | 12.55% | 12,317 | 12.24% | 365,563 | 6.13% |
| Total Polled | 31,884 | 74.72% | 100,669 | 62.17% | 5,962,031 | 63.60% |
| Registered Electors | 42,671 | | 161,927 | | 9,374,164 | |

== Demographics ==
=== Ethnicity ===
The Bibile Polling Division has a Sinhalese majority (93.5%) . In comparison, the Monaragala Electoral District (which contains the Bibile Polling Division) has a Sinhalese majority (94.9%)

Ethnicity in Bibile
1. Sinhalese (93.5%)
2. Moor (5.50%)
3. Other (1.00%)

=== Religion ===
The Bibile Polling Division has a Buddhist majority (93.2%) . In comparison, the Monaragala Electoral District (which contains the Bibile Polling Division) has a Buddhist majority (94.6%)

Religion in Bibile
1. Buddhist (93.2%)
2. Muslim (5.60%)
3. Other (1.30%)
