= Monaragala Electoral District =

Electoral district in Sri Lanka

Monaragala
- Electoral District for the Parliament of Sri Lanka
- Administrative District: Monaragala
- Province: Uva
- Polling divisions: 3
- Population: 430,000 (2008)
- Electorate: 300,642 (2010)
- Area: 5,639 km^{2} (2,177 sq mi)

Current Electoral District
- Number of members: 6
- MPs: NPP (5) R. M. Jayawardena; Ajith Priyadarshana; Chathuri Gangani; Ruwan Wijeweera; Sarath Kumara SJB (1) H. M. Dharmasena

Monaragala electoral district is one of the 22 multi-member electoral districts of Sri Lanka created by the 1978 Constitution of Sri Lanka. The district is conterminous with the administrative district of Monaragala in the Uva province. The district currently elects 5 of the 225 members of the Sri Lankan Parliament and had 300,642 registered electors in 2010. The district is Sri Lanka's Electorate Number 20.

== Polling Divisions ==
The Badulla Electoral District consists of the following polling divisions:

A: Bibile

B: Monaragala

C: Wellawaya

== 1982 Presidential Election ==
Results of the 1st presidential election held on 20 October 1982 for the district:

Candidate	Party	Votes per Polling Division			Postal Votes	Total Votes	%
Candidate	Party	Bibile	Monara -gala	Wella -waya	Postal Votes	Total Votes	%
Junius Jayewardene	UNP	16,821	16,836	16,874	733	51,264	49.38%
Hector Kobbekaduwa	SLFP	11,820	16,060	15,797	438	44,115	42.49%
Rohana Wijeweera	JVP	1,180	1,721	4,225	45	7,171	6.91%
Colvin R. de Silva	LSSP	313	343	214	12	882	0.85%
Vasudeva Nanayakkara	NSSP	71	93	55	7	226	0.22%
Kumar Ponnambalam	ACTC	55	73	35	0	163	0.16%
Valid Votes		30,260	35,126	37,200	1,235	103,821	100.00%
Rejected Votes		458	526	563	6	1,553	
Total Polled		30,718	35,652	37,763	1,241	105,374	
Registered Electors		35,895	41,675	48,988		126,558	
Turnout		85.58%	85.55%	77.09%		83.26%	

== 1988 Presidential Election ==
Results of the 2nd presidential election held on 19 December 1988 for the district:

Candidate	Party	Votes per Polling Division			Postal Votes	Total Votes	%
Candidate	Party	Bibile	Monara -gala	Wella -waya	Postal Votes	Total Votes	%
Ranasinghe Premadasa	UNP	9,091	1,781	5,895	105	16,872	63.21%
Sirimavo Bandaranaike	SLFP	5,507	1,366	2,188	62	9,123	34.18%
Oswin Abeygunasekara	SLMP	371	110	212	4	697	2.61%
Valid Votes		14,969	3,257	8,295	171	26,692	100.00%
Rejected Votes		507	116	191	37	851	
Total Polled		15,476	3,373	8,486	208	27,543	
Registered Electors		43,093	51,823	67,011		161,927	
Turnout		35.91%	6.51%	12.66%		17.01%	

== 1989 Parliamentary General Election ==
Results of the 9th parliamentary election held on 15 February 1989 for the district:

Party	Votes per Polling Division			Postal Votes	Total Votes	%	Seats
Party	Bibile	Monara -gala	Wella -waya	Postal Votes	Total Votes	%	Seats
United National Party	16,362	13,141	16,136	674	46,313	52.42%	3
Sri Lanka Freedom Party	10,361	16,700	11,018	561	38,640	43.73%	2
United Socialist Alliance (CPSL, LSSP, NSSP, SLMP)	815	990	325	19	2,149	2.43%	0
Mahajana Eksath Peramuna	87	121	226	17	451	0.51%	0
Sri Lanka Muslim Congress	161	195	94	0	450	0.51%	0
Independent	96	155	97	1	349	0.40%	0
Valid Votes	27,882	31,302	27,896	1,272	88,352	100.00%	5
Rejected Votes	4,002	4,396	3,896	23	12,317		
Total Polled	31,884	35,698	31,792	1,295	100,669		
Registered Electors	42,671	51,157	66,645	1,454	161,927		
Turnout	74.72%	69.78%	47.70%	89.06%	62.17%		

The following candidates were elected: Dissanayake Mudiyanselage Gunewathie Dissanayake (SLFP), 26,193 preference votes (pv); R. M. Dharmadasa Banda (UNP), 20,788 pv; R.M. Ranjith Madduma Bandara (UNP), 19,165 pv; Gamini Wijith Wijayamuni Soyza (SLFP), 15,128 pv; and Dissanayake Mudiyanselage Ariyaratna (UNP), 12,985 pv.

== 1994 Parliamentary General Election ==
Results of the 10th parliamentary election held on 16 August 1994 for the district:

Party	Votes per Polling Division			Postal Votes	Total Votes	%	Seats
Party	Bibile	Monara -gala	Wella -waya	Postal Votes	Total Votes	%	Seats
People's Alliance (SLFP et al.)	18,546	27,459	29,989	1,961	77,955	50.40%	3
United National Party	18,526	20,277	27,463	1,487	67,753	43.81%	2
Independent 4	1,104	1,215	4,220	53	6,592	4.26%	0
Sri Lanka Progressive Front (JVP)	422	431	1,000	43	1,896	1.23%	0
Independent 5	59	81	66	1	207	0.13%	0
Independent 2	42	40	24	0	106	0.07%	0
Independent 1	28	37	23	2	90	0.06%	0
Independent 3	27	21	16	0	64	0.04%	0
Valid Votes	38,754	49,561	62,801	3,547	154,663	100.00%	5
Rejected Votes	4,140	5,328	6,766	71	16,305		
Total Polled	42,894	54,889	69,567	3,618	170,968		
Registered Electors	50,852	64,229	84,310		199,391		
Turnout	84.35%	85.46%	82.51%		85.75%		

The following candidates were elected: Sumedha G. Jayasena (PA), 55,369 preference votes (pv); R. M. Dharmadasa Banda (UNP), 44,956 pv; R.M. Ranjith Madduma Bandara (UNP), 36,747 pv; A. P. Jagath Pushpakumara (PA), 34,663 pv; and Attanayake Mudiyanselage Jayawardana (PA), 27,080 pv.

== 1994 Presidential Election ==
Results of the 3rd presidential election held on 9 November 1994 for the district:

Candidate	Party	Votes per Polling Division			Postal Votes	Total Votes	%
Candidate	Party	Bibile	Monara -gala	Wella -waya	Postal Votes	Total Votes	%
Chandrika Kumaratunga	PA	24,271	31,950	38,050	2,349	96,620	63.20%
Srimathi Dissanayake	UNP	13,867	15,801	21,090	1,268	52,026	34.03%
Hudson Samarasinghe	Ind 2	674	687	600	5	1,966	1.29%
Harischandra Wijayatunga	SMBP	209	234	414	20	877	0.57%
Nihal Galappaththi	SLPF	246	261	295	22	824	0.54%
A.J. Ranashinge	Ind 1	200	175	174	7	556	0.36%
Valid Votes		39,467	49,108	60,623	3,671	152,869	100.00%
Rejected Votes		928	1,456	1,553	40	3,977	
Total Polled		40,395	50,564	62,176	3,711	156,846	
Registered Electors		50,852	64,229	84,310		199,391	
Turnout		79.44%	78.72%	73.75%		78.66%	

== 1999 Provincial Council Election ==
Results of the 3rd Uva provincial council election held on 6 April 1999 for the district:

Party	Votes	%	Seats
People's Alliance (SLFP, SLMC et al.)	66,870	45.35%	
United National Party	65,340	44.31%	
Janatha Vimukthi Peramuna	10,292	6.98%	
New Left Front (NSSP et al.)	2,182	1.48%	
National Union of Workers (CWC, DWC)	1,927	1.31%	
Mahajana Eksath Peramuna	419	0.28%	
Independent 2	273	0.19%	
Independent 1	101	0.07%	
Sri Lanka Progressive Front	50	0.03%	
Valid Votes	147,454	100.00%	
Rejected Votes	3,976		
Total Polled	151,430		
Registered Electors	224,077		
Turnout	67.58%		

== 1999 Presidential Election ==
Results of the 4th presidential election held on 21 December 1999 for the district:

Candidate	Party	Votes per Polling Division			Postal Votes	Total Votes	%
Candidate	Party	Bibile	Monara -gala	Wella -waya	Postal Votes	Total Votes	%
Chandrika Kumaratunga	PA	21,890	30,055	37,950	2,154	92,049	51.07%
Ranil Wickremasinghe	UNP	19,156	21,049	31,534	1,956	73,695	40.89%
Nandana Gunathilake	JVP	2,337	2,465	5,279	375	10,456	5.80%
Rajiva Wijesinha	Liberal	294	256	307	3	860	0.48%
W.V.M. Ranjith	Ind 2	247	264	305	0	816	0.45%
T. Edirisuriya	Ind 1	204	226	248	0	678	0.38%
Harischandra Wijayatunga	SMBP	130	155	176	20	481	0.27%
Kamal Karunadasa	PLSF	85	101	148	2	336	0.19%
Vasudeva Nanayakkara	LDA	78	62	126	22	288	0.16%
Abdul Rasool	SLMP	57	58	99	1	215	0.12%
Hudson Samarasinghe	Ind 3	43	53	49	0	145	0.08%
A. Dissanayaka	DUNF	26	57	41	2	126	0.07%
A.W. Premawardhana	PFF	27	34	39	0	100	0.06%
Valid Votes		44,574	54,835	76,301	4,535	180,245	100.00%
Rejected Votes		1,028	1,489	1,503	141	4,161	
Total Polled		45,602	56,324	77,804	4,676	184,406	
Registered Electors		58,803	73,336	98,437		230,576	
Turnout		77.55%	76.80%	79.04%		79.98%	

== 2000 Parliamentary General Election ==
Results of the 11th parliamentary election held on 10 October 2000 for the district:

Party	Votes per Polling Division			Postal Votes	Total Votes	%	Seats
Party	Bibile	Monara -gala	Wella -waya	Postal Votes	Total Votes	%	Seats
People's Alliance (SLFP et al.)	22,011	29,668	36,697	3,028	91,404	49.69%	3
United National Party	19,022	21,063	33,390	2,425	75,900	41.27%	2
Janatha Vimukthi Peramuna	2,783	3,228	6,581	567	13,159	7.15%	0
New Left Front (NSSP et al.)	431	502	609	5	1,547	0.84%	0
Citizen's Front	132	128	166	5	431	0.23%	0
United Sinhala Great Council	103	116	134	2	355	0.19%	0
Sinhala Heritage	74	103	121	29	327	0.18%	0
Democratic United National Front	48	49	68	0	165	0.09%	0
Liberal Party	62	42	32	2	138	0.08%	0
Independent 1	36	30	34	1	101	0.05%	0
Sinhalaye Mahasammatha Bhoomiputra Pakshaya	21	39	28	5	93	0.05%	0
Independent 6	26	22	16	0	64	0.03%	0
Independent 4	18	18	23	0	59	0.03%	0
Independent 3	18	15	23	1	57	0.03%	0
People's Freedom Front	6	18	13	1	38	0.02%	0
Independent 2	5	13	16	0	34	0.02%	0
Independent 5	14	10	9	0	33	0.02%	0
Sri Lanka Progressive Front	7	11	7	1	26	0.01%	0
Valid Votes	44,817	55,075	77,967	6,072	183,931	100.00%	5
Rejected Votes	3,222	4,608	5,567	191	13,588		
Total Polled	48,039	59,683	83,534	6,263	197,519		
Registered Electors	60,633	75,537	101,765		237,935		
Turnout	79.23%	79.01%	82.09%		83.01%		

The following candidates were elected: Gamini Wijith Wijayamuni Soyza (PA), 37,312 preference votes (pv); Jayasundara Mudiyanselage Ananda Kumarasiri (UNP), 36,487 pv; Sumedha G. Jayasena (PA), 33,946 pv; Jayasundara Wijekoon (PA), 33,784 pv; and R.M. Ranjith Madduma Bandara (UNP), 31,269 pv.

== 2001 Parliamentary General Election ==
Results of the 12th parliamentary election held on 5 December 2001 for the district:

Party	Votes per Polling Division			Postal Votes	Total Votes	%	Seats
Party	Bibile	Monara -gala	Wella -waya	Postal Votes	Total Votes	%	Seats
People's Alliance (SLFP et al.)	19,423	26,591	33,230		81,805	43.67%	3
United National Front (UNP, SLMC, CWC, DPF)	20,258	23,313	34,428		80,549	43.00%	2
Janatha Vimukthi Peramuna	4,823	5,230	11,148		21,987	11.74%	0
New Left Front (NSSP et al.)	538	571	625		1,745	0.93%	0
Sinhala Heritage	65	130	145		359	0.19%	0
United Lalith Front	66	61	86		215	0.11%	0
Independent 1	45	51	74		171	0.09%	0
Independent 6	38	43	31		112	0.06%	0
People's Freedom Front	26	30	35		91	0.05%	0
Liberal Party	29	23	31		84	0.04%	0
Independent 2	15	16	23		54	0.03%	0
Sri Lanka National Front	14	18	17		49	0.03%	0
Independent 3	10	9	17		36	0.02%	0
Independent 5	11	8	9		28	0.01%	0
Sri Lanka Progressive Front	6	10	8		25	0.01%	0
Independent 4	4	6	13		23	0.01%	0
Valid Votes	45,371	56,110	79,920		187,333	100.00%	5
Rejected Votes	4,053	4,476	6,103		15,638		
Total Polled	49,424	60,586	86,023		202,971		
Registered Electors	62,810	78,033	106,437		247,280		
Turnout	78.69%	77.64%	80.82%		82.08%		

The following candidates were elected: R.M. Ranjith Madduma Bandara (UNF), 38,474 preference votes (pv); Jayasundara Mudiyanselage Ananda Kumarasiri (UNF), 37,567 pv; A. P. Jagath Pushpakumara (PA), 32,754 pv; Sumedha G. Jayasena (PA), 31,239 pv; and Gamini Wijith Wijayamuni Soyza (PA), 30,724 pv.

== 2004 Parliamentary General Election ==
Results of the 13th parliamentary election held on 2 April 2004 for the district:

Party	Votes per Polling Division			Postal Votes	Total Votes	%	Seats
Party	Bibile	Monara -gala	Wella -waya	Postal Votes	Total Votes	%	Seats
United People's Freedom Alliance (SLFP, JVP et al.)	27,149	34,503	51,137	4,667	117,456	61.14%	3
United National Front (UNP, SLMC, CWC, DPF)	17,851	21,593	29,102	2,521	71,067	36.99%	2
Jathika Hela Urumaya	293	586	1,618	178	2,675	1.39%	0
United Lalith Front	82	78	112	3	275	0.14%	0
National Development Front	35	54	68	1	158	0.08%	0
United Socialist Party	41	42	50	2	135	0.07%	0
Independent 7	22	43	22	0	87	0.05%	0
New Left Front (NSSP et al.)	13	26	34	3	76	0.04%	0
Independent 6	9	14	16	0	39	0.02%	0
Sinhalaye Mahasammatha Bhoomiputra Pakshaya	3	7	8	1	19	0.01%	0
Sri Lanka National Front	2	10	4	3	19	0.01%	0
Independent 2	5	4	9	0	18	0.01%	0
Independent 1	3	5	8	1	17	0.01%	0
Independent 5	5	7	4	1	17	0.01%	0
Independent 4	4	10	1	0	15	0.01%	0
Ruhuna People's Party	2	5	3	2	12	0.01%	0
Swarajya	4	4	3	0	11	0.01%	0
Independent 3	4	3	4	0	11	0.01%	0
Sri Lanka Progressive Front	0	2	2	2	6	0.00%	0
Valid Votes	45,527	56,996	82,205	7,385	192,113	100.00%	5
Rejected Votes	3,255	4,142	5,296	123	12,816		
Total Polled	48,782	61,138	87,501	7,508	204,929		
Registered Electors	65,934	83,194	113,614		262,742		
Turnout	73.99%	73.49%	77.02%		78.00%		

The following candidates were elected: R. M. Padma Udhaya Shantha Gunasekera (UPFA-JVP), 71,115 preference votes (pv); A. P. Jagath Pushpakumara (UPFA-SLFP), 52,887 pv; Sumedha G. Jayasena (UPFA-SLFP), 47,538 pv; R.M. Ranjith Madduma Bandara (UNF-UNP), 41,889 pv; and R. M. Dharmadasa Banda (UNF-UNP), 36,104 pv.

== 2004 Provincial Council Election ==
Results of the 4th Uva provincial council election held on 10 July 2004 for the district:

Party	Votes per Polling Division			Postal Votes	Total Votes	%	Seats
Party	Bibile	Monara -gala	Wella -waya	Postal Votes	Total Votes	%	Seats
United People's Freedom Alliance (SLFP, JVP et al.)	25,279	29,805	39,227	3,567	97,878	66.24%	7
United National Party	12,019	16,035	19,239	1,637	48,930	33.12%	4
United Socialist Party	142	217	251	6	616	0.42%	0
Independent	37	36	42	2	117	0.08%	0
Sinhalaye Mahasammatha Bhoomiputra Pakshaya	15	14	30	6	65	0.04%	0
Democratic United National Front	10	36	6	3	55	0.04%	0
Sri Lanka National Front	14	8	13	4	39	0.03%	0
United Sinhala Great Council	7	12	13	1	33	0.02%	0
Sri Lanka Progressive Front	5	6	8	1	20	0.01%	0
Valid Votes	37,528	46,169	58,829	5,227	147,753	100.00%	11
Rejected Votes	2,732	3,448	4,419	232	10,831		
Total Polled	40,260	49,617	63,248	5,459	158,584		
Registered Electors	65,934	83,194	113,614		262,742		
Turnout	61.06%	59.64%	55.67%		60.36%		

The following candidates were elected: Gamini Vijitha Vijayamuni Zoysa (UPFA), 31,361 preference votes (pv); R. M. Jayawardhena (UPFA), 30,017 pv; Arachchige Udaya Kumara Wengappuli (UPFA), 27,495 pv; H. M. K. Herath (UPFA), 24,709 pv; Attanayaka Mudiyanselage Kithsiri Senerth Bandara Attanayake (UPFA), 20,245 pv; Arachchige Vijitha Berugoda (UPFA), 17,382 pv; Kumarasiri Rathnayake (UPFA), 17,146 pv; R. M. Jayasinghe Bandara (UNP), 16,467 pv; Ananda Kumarasiri (UNP), 15,280 pv; Arvin Sampath Jayasooriya (UNP), 14,935 pv; and A. A. M. Munirathna (UNP) 9,570 pv.

== 2005 Presidential Election ==
Results of the 5th presidential election held on 17 November 2005 for the district:

Candidate	Party	Votes per Polling Division			Postal Votes	Total Votes	%
Candidate	Party	Bibile	Monara -gala	Wella -waya	Postal Votes	Total Votes	%
Mahinda Rajapaksa	UPFA	28,663	37,575	54,066	5,790	126,094	56.94%
Ranil Wickremasinghe	UNP	22,103	27,754	39,117	3,270	92,244	41.65%
A.A. Suraweera	NDF	280	304	352	7	943	0.43%
Siritunga Jayasuriya	USP	169	254	248	2	673	0.30%
Chamil Jayaneththi	NLF	64	86	137	8	295	0.13%
Aruna de Soyza	RPP	69	87	127	3	286	0.13%
Victor Hettigoda	ULPP	56	66	101	16	239	0.11%
Wimal Geeganage	SLNF	59	56	84	1	200	0.09%
Anura De Silva	ULF	43	37	52	1	133	0.06%
A.K.J. Arachchige	DUA	38	31	54	1	124	0.06%
Wije Dias	SEP	32	31	38	1	102	0.05%
P. Nelson Perera	SLPF	23	23	26	1	73	0.03%
H.S. Dharmadwaja	UNAF	13	14	17	0	44	0.02%
Valid Votes		51,612	66,318	94,419	9,101	221,450	100.00%
Rejected Votes		567	897	1,055	117	2,636	
Total Polled		52,179	67,215	95,474	9,218	224,086	
Registered Electors		68,660	87,943	119,506		276,109	
Turnout		76.00%	76.43%	79.89%		81.16%	

== 2009 Provincial Council Election ==
Results of the 5th Uva provincial council election held on 8 August 2009 for the district:

Party	Votes per Polling Division			Postal Votes	Total Votes	%	Seats
Party	Bibile	Monara -gala	Wella -waya	Postal Votes	Total Votes	%	Seats
United People's Freedom Alliance (SLFP et al.)	36,499	49,420	66,842	7,076	159,837	81.32%	9
United National Party	6,503	9,187	14,026	793	30,509	15.52%	2
Janatha Vimukthi Peramuna	1,699	1,208	2,491	234	5,632	2.87%	0
National Development Front	64	101	59	2	226	0.11%	0
United Socialist Party	23	43	85	2	153	0.08%	0
United Lanka Great Council	26	16	20	0	62	0.03%	0
Independent 3	12	19	24	0	55	0.03%	0
Independent 1	8	6	8	0	22	0.01%	0
Patriotic National Front	9	5	6	0	20	0.01%	0
Independent 2	6	3	4	0	13	0.01%	0
Sinhalaye Mahasammatha Bhoomiputra Pakshaya	4	3	3	0	10	0.01%	0
Sri Lanka Progressive Front	4	4	2	0	10	0.01%	0
Valid Votes	44,857	60,015	83,570	8,107	196,549	100.00%	11
Rejected Votes	2,533	3,268	3,922	246	9,969		
Total Polled	47,390	63,283	87,492	8,353	206,518		
Registered Electors	74,692	96,386	129,564		300,642		
Turnout	63.45%	65.66%	67.53%		68.69%		

The following candidates were elected: Shashindra Rajapaksa (UPFA), 136,697 preference votes (pv); Kumarasiri Rathnayake (UPFA), 44,623 pv; Arachchige Vijitha Berugoda (UPFA), 35,079 pv; Arachchige Wimal Galagama Arachchi (UPFA), 29,777 pv; Anil Chandana Weliwita (UPFA), 26,856 pv; Balage Saliya Sumedha De Silva (UPFA), 26,079 pv; Attanayaka Mudiyanselage Kithsiri Senerth Bandara Attanayake (UPFA), 23,930 pv; Arachchige Udaya Kumara Wengappuli (UPFA), 23,718 pv; Akwida Wediwela Mudiyanselage Dayarathna Bandara (UPFA), 22,366 pv; Thisakutti Arachchige Chaminda Janaka (UNP), 13,049 pv; and Ananda Kumarasiri Jayasundara Mudiyanselage (UNP), 10,538 pv.

== 2010 Presidential Election ==
Results of the 6th presidential election held on 26 January 2010 for the district:

Candidate	Party	Votes per Polling Division			Postal Votes	Total Votes	%
Candidate	Party	Bibile	Monara -gala	Wella -waya	Postal Votes	Total Votes	%
Mahinda Rajapaksa	UPFA	34,523	46,731	68,310	8,871	158,435	69.01%
Sarath Fonseka	NDF	15,649	19,990	27,369	3,795	66,803	29.10%
A.A. Suraweera	NDF	252	261	355	6	874	0.38%
M.C.M. Ismail	DUNF	192	193	290	9	684	0.30%
W.V. Mahiman Ranjith	Ind 1	153	191	248	12	604	0.26%
A.S.P Liyanage	SLLP	104	108	148	4	364	0.16%
C.J. Sugathsiri Gamage	UDF	104	121	114	3	342	0.15%
Sarath Manamendra	NSH	48	74	69	0	191	0.08%
Ukkubanda Wijekoon	Ind 3	51	57	76	2	186	0.08%
Lal Perera	ONF	47	70	54	0	171	0.07%
Siritunga Jayasuriya	USP	37	47	72	2	158	0.07%
Vikramabahu Karunaratne	LF	34	32	49	4	119	0.05%
Aithurus M. Illias	Ind 2	23	28	56	2	109	0.05%
M. K. Shivajilingam	Ind 5	23	47	37	0	107	0.05%
Sanath Pinnaduwa	NA	14	30	29	0	73	0.03%
M. Mohamed Musthaffa	Ind 4	12	23	30	3	68	0.03%
Wije Dias	SEP	27	19	17	0	63	0.03%
Battaramulla Seelarathana	JP	16	14	26	0	56	0.02%
Senaratna de Silva	PNF	15	14	24	0	53	0.02%
Aruna de Soyza	RPP	10	23	18	1	52	0.02%
Sarath Kongahage	UNAF	11	12	16	1	40	0.02%
M.B. Thaminimulla	ACAKO	12	11	7	2	32	0.01%
Valid Votes		51,357	68,096	97,414	12,717	229,584	100.00%
Rejected Votes		544	743	790	195	2,272	
Total Polled		51,901	68,839	98,204	12,912	231,856	
Registered Electors		74,692	96,386	129,564		300,642	
Turnout		69.49%	71.42%	75.80%		77.12%	

== 2010 Parliamentary General Election ==
Results of the 14th parliamentary election held on 8 April 2010 for the district:

Party	Votes per Polling Division			Postal Votes	Total Votes	%	Seats
Party	Bibile	Monara -gala	Wella -waya	Postal Votes	Total Votes	%	Seats
United People's Freedom Alliance (SLFP et al.)	28,575	32,315	50,073	9,671	120,634	75.64%	4
United National Front (UNP, SLMC, DPF, SLFP(P))	6,172	8,500	12,199	2,021	28,892	18.12%	1
Democratic National Alliance (JVP et al.)	1,610	2,168	4,507	733	9,018	5.65%	0
Our National Front	61	74	126	14	275	0.17%	0
Sri Lanka National Front	18	65	41	12	136	0.09%	0
Independent 4	16	23	29	0	68	0.04%	0
National Development Front	18	23	24	1	66	0.04%	0
Independent 2	13	26	20	5	64	0.04%	0
United Socialist Party	10	28	22	0	60	0.04%	0
Janasetha Peramuna	13	31	10	4	58	0.04%	0
United National Alternative Front	17	18	19	3	57	0.04%	0
Independent 3	8	19	12	1	40	0.03%	0
Independent 1	7	9	16	0	32	0.02%	0
Patriotic National Front	9	6	12	2	29	0.02%	0
United Democratic Front	4	7	13	5	29	0.02%	0
Ruhuna People's Party	7	5	0	0	12	0.01%	0
Left Liberation Front	3	7	1	0	11	0.01%	0
Sinhalaye Mahasammatha Bhoomiputra Pakshaya	2	3	3	2	10	0.01%	0
Valid Votes	36,563	43,327	67,127	12,474	159,491	100.00%	5
Rejected Votes	2,837	3,112	3,694	506	10,149		
Total Polled	39,400	46,439	70,821	12,980	169,640		
Registered Electors	74,692	96,386	129,564		300,642		
Turnout	52.75%	48.18%	54.66%		56.43%		

The following candidates were elected: A. P. Jagath Pushpakumara (UPFA-SLFP), 67,903 preference votes (pv); Gamini Vijith Vijayamuni Zoysa (UPFA), 54,516 pv; Sumedha G. Jayasena (UPFA-SLFP), 45,837 pv; Aarachchige Vijitha Berugoda (UPFA), 43,001 pv; and R.M. Ranjith Madduma Bandara (UNF-UNP), 15,105 pv.
