= Democratic National Alliance (Sri Lanka) =

Democratic National Alliance ප්‍රජාතන්ත්‍රවාදී ජාතික සන්ධානය ஜனநாயகக் கட்சி
- Abbreviation: DNA
- Leader: Sarath Fonseka
- Chairperson: Tiran Alles
- Secretary: Nirmal Fernando
- Founded: November 22, 2009
- Headquarters: 3/1 Royal Avenue, Colombo 07

Election symbol
- Trophy

The Democratic National Alliance was a political alliance in Sri Lanka, formed by retired General Sarath Fonseka and his allies to contest in the 2010 general elections. The alliance was mainly made up of allies of Fonseka and of the following parties

- Janatha Vimukthi Peramuna (JVP)
- Democratic National Front
- Democratic United National Front
- People's Tamil Congress
- Voice of Muslim Organization

Ruhunu Janatha Party left the alliance and joined the UPFA March 2010. Nava Sihala Urumaya was a member of the DNA until it was sacked from the alliance in November 2010. The DNA's application for registration as a separate party was rejected by the authorities in January 2011. The JVP would also leave the alliance in 2010.

== 2010 general election ==
The Democratic National Alliance had a poor showing at the 2010 general election, obtaining a little over 5% of the national vote and winning just 7 seats in the 225 member parliament. This is a significant decline from the 40% national vote Fonseka obtained in the 2010 presidential election when he was endorsed by many notable opposition parties which did not join the DNA at the general election, including the main opposition United National Party and the Tamil National Alliance and decrease from the 39 members the Janatha Vimukthi Peramuna JVP alone had in parliament. Apart from Fonseka, the members elected were former Sri Lanka national cricket team captain and former SLFP member MP Arjuna Ranatunga, businessman Tiran Alles and four members of the JVP. Fonseka was later jailed by court martial and vacated his seat on 7 October 2010. After a legal battle to maintain his MP status he was replaced by DNA member Jayantha Ketagoda on 8 March 2011.

== Electoral history ==
Sri Lanka Parliamentary Elections
Election year	Votes	Vote %	Seats won	+/–	Government
2010	441,251	5.49%	7 / 225	▲7	Opposition
