= 2010 Sri Lankan parliamentary election =

Election in Sri Lanka

← 2004	8 April 2010 (first round); 20 April 2010 (second round)	2015 →

All 225 seats to the Parliament of Sri Lanka 113 seats were needed for a majority
- Turnout: 61.26%
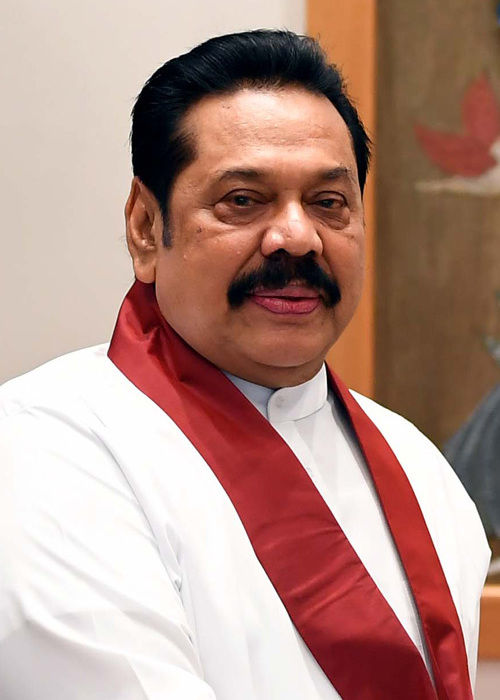

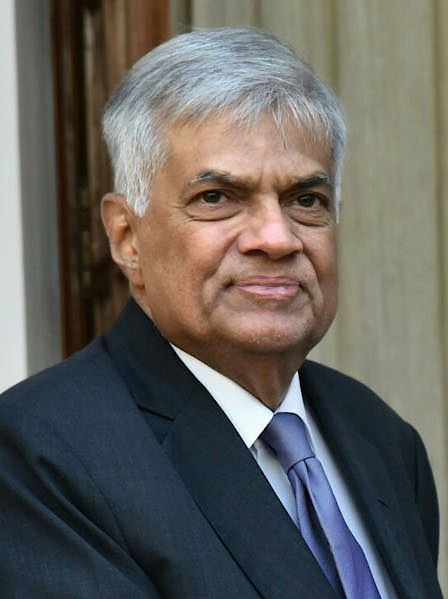

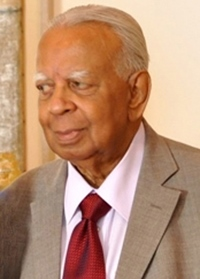

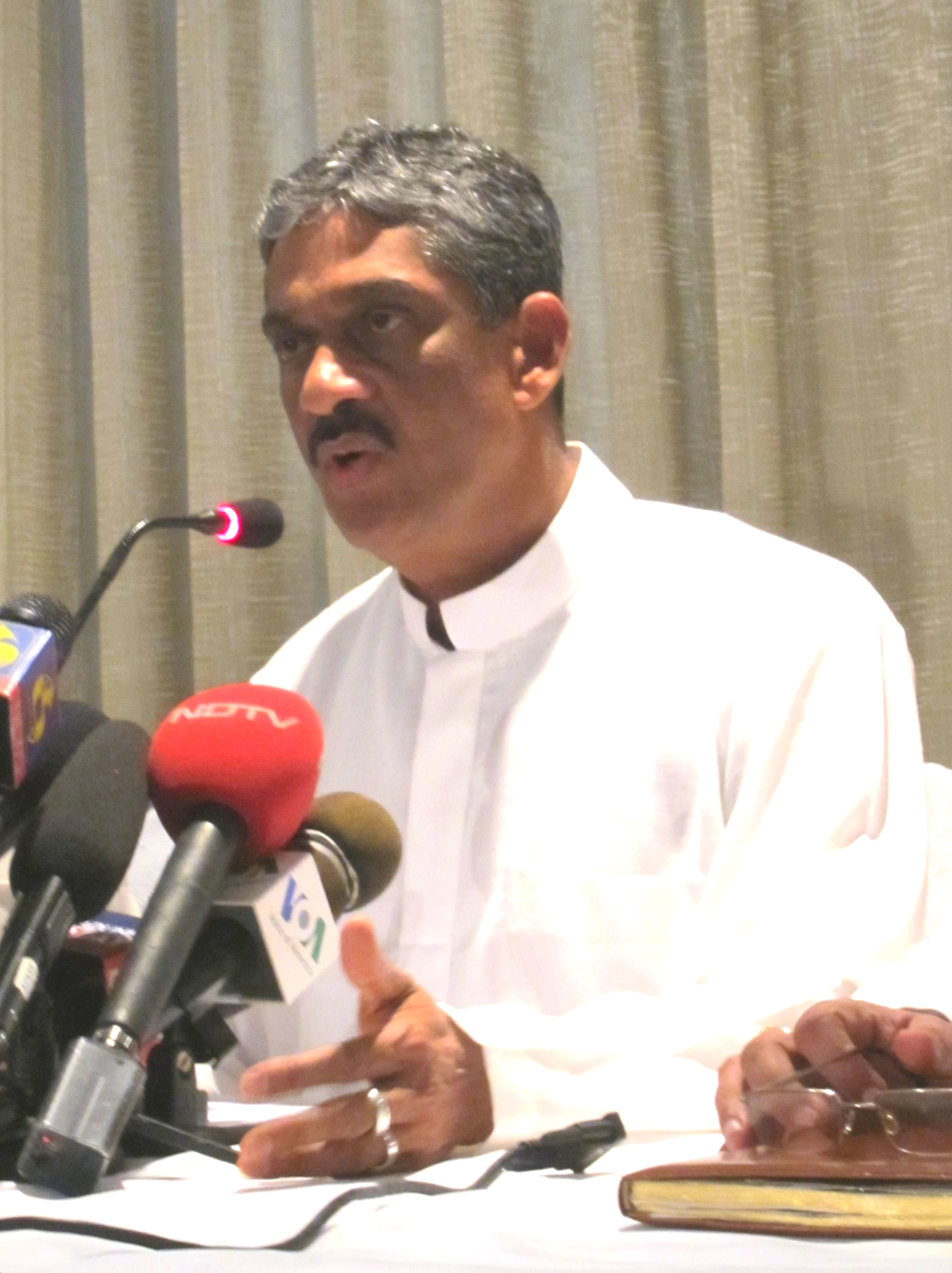
	First party	Second party
Leader	Mahinda Rajapaksa	Ranil Wickremesinghe
Party	UPFA	UNF
Leader since	2005	1994
Leader's seat	n/a	Colombo District
Last election	45.60%, 105 seats	37.83%, 82 seats
Seats won	144	60
Seat change	▲39	▼22
Popular vote	4,846,388	2,357,057
Percentage	60.33%	29.34%
Swing	▲14.73%	▼8.49%
	Third party	Fourth party
Leader	Rajavarothiam Sampanthan	Sarath Fonseka
Party	TNA	DNA
Leader since	2001	2010
Leader's seat	Trincomalee District	Colombo District
Last election	6.84%, 22 seats	Did not exist
Seats won	14	7
Seat change	▼8	New party
Popular vote	233,190	441,251
Percentage	2.90%	5.49%
Swing	▼3.94%	New party
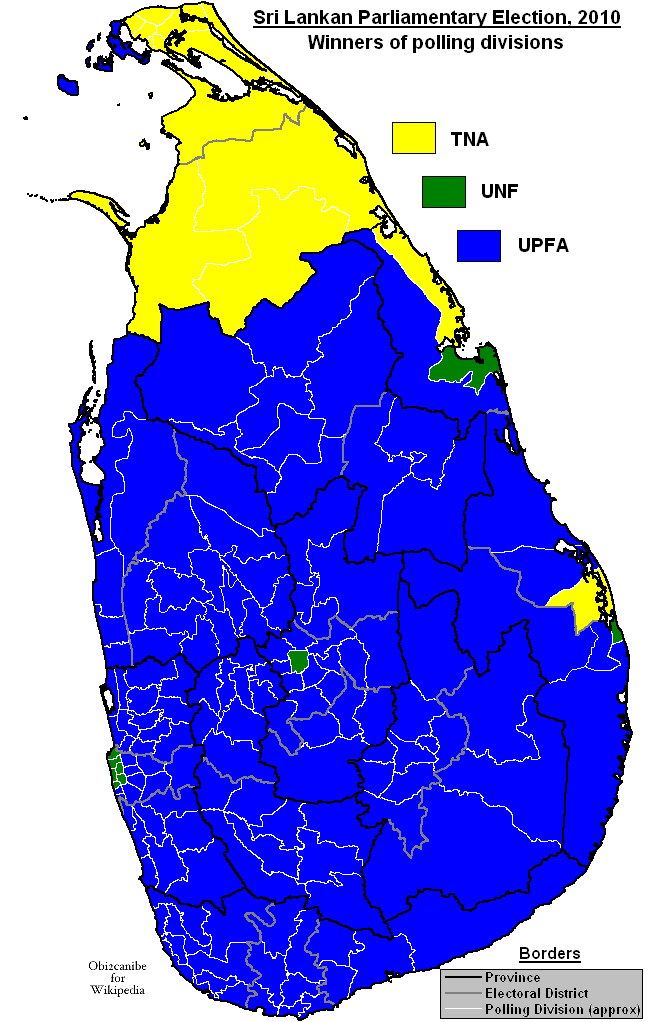
- Winners of polling divisions. UPFA in blue, UNF in green and TNA in yellow.
Prime Minister before election
Ratnasiri Wickremanayake
UPFA
Prime Minister after election
D. M. Jayaratne
UPFA

Parliamentary elections were held in Sri Lanka on 8 and 20 April 2010, to elect 225 members to Sri Lanka's 14th Parliament. 14,088,500 Sri Lankans were eligible to vote in the election at 11,102 polling stations. It was the first general election to be held in Sri Lanka following the conclusion of the civil war which lasted 26 years.

The main parties contesting in the election were the ruling United People's Freedom Alliance (UPFA), the main opposition United National Front (UNF) and the Democratic National Alliance (DNA) led by former commander of the Sri Lankan Army Sarath Fonseka. President Mahinda Rajapaksa had previously been reelected as president in January 2010.

As expected, the UPFA secured a landslide victory in the elections, buoyed by its achievement of ending the 30 year Sri Lankan Civil War and defeating the Liberation Tigers of Tamil Eelam in May 2009. The UPFA won a large majority in the parliament, obtaining 144 seats, an increase of 39 since the 2004 election. The main opposition UNF won 60 seats, a decline of 22. The minority Tamil party Tamil National Alliance (TNA) won 14 seats, down from the 22 they won in 2004, and the DNA, contesting for the first time, won 7 seats. The UPFA however fell short of its goal of obtaining a two-thirds supermajority in the house, which it would have needed to change the constitution on its own. The election had the lowest voter turnout in Sri Lanka since independence.

While the elections were initially scheduled to be concluded on 8 April, irregularities in two districts led the Commissioner of Elections to hold re-polls on 20 April. Final results were announced the following day, a day before the new parliament was scheduled to meet for the first time.

== Background ==
General elections are usually held every six years in Sri Lanka, to elect 225 members to the Parliament of Sri Lanka. The country is divided into 22 electoral districts, and each district is assigned a specific number of seats depending on the districts population, with 196 seats distributed among the districts. At the election, parties contesting in a given district are awarded a certain number of seats available from the district based on the number of votes obtained in the whole district. The remaining 29 seats are distributed amongst the contesting political parties based on the percentage of the national vote received by each party.

The previous parliamentary election was held on April 2, 2004. The newly formed UPFA alliance became the largest group in Parliament by winning 105 of the 225 seats, allowing it to form a minority government with the support of the sole Eelam People's Democratic Party MP. On April 6, 2004, President Chandrika Kumaratunga appointed Mahinda Rajapaksa, the leader of the UPFA, as the new prime minister. The rest of the government were sworn in on April 10, 2004. The new parliament was sworn in on April 22, 2004.

Since then a number of defections and counter-defections from the opposition have increased the number of government MPs to 129, most of whom have been rewarded with ministerial posts:

- 9 August 2004: Three Sri Lanka Muslim Congress (SLMC) MPs join UPFA.
- 3 September 2004: Ceylon Workers' Congress (eight MPs) joins UPFA, giving it a majority in parliament.
- 16 June 2005: Janatha Vimukthi Peramuna (JVP) (39 MPs) quits UPFA.
- 25 January 2006: Four United National Party MPs join UPFA.
- 28 January 2007: 18 UNP MPs and 6 SLMC MPs join UPFA.
- 30 January 2007: Jathika Hela Urumaya (eight MPs) joins UPFA.
- 12 December 2007: Four SLMC MPs quit the UPFA.
- 28 December 2008: 12 MPs, who had left the JVP in May 2008 to form the National Freedom Front, join the UPFA.

This has allowed the UPFA form a stable government for six years.

Following the expiration of the second term of President Kumaratunge, Prime Minister Mahinda Rajapakse defeated the leader of the United National Party and former prime minister Ranil Wickremasinghe in the 2005 Presidential election. He was succeeded as prime minister by Ratnasiri Wickremanayake. Under Rajapakse, the Sri Lankan military defeated the militant Liberation Tigers of Tamil Eelam group in May 2009, ending the 30 year Sri Lankan Civil War and significantly increasing Rajapaksa's popularity in the country. Rajapaksa rode this wave of popularity to win the 2010 Presidential election, defeating opposition candidate Sarath Fonseka by a large margin.

== Details ==
With the term of the 13th Parliament (also known as the 6th Parliament) scheduled to end in April 2010, Rajapaksa dissolved parliament on February 9, 2010, paving the way for fresh elections. Nominations took place between February 19 and February 26, and the date of the election was set for April 8, 2010. 14,088,500 Sri Lankans were eligible to vote in the election, for which 11,102 polling stations were set up. Of this, 415,432 people were eligible to cast their vote via postal voting. Final votes were counted at 1,387 counting centers around the country.

Since the 2004 election, there were four changes to number of seats allocated to each electoral district. Anuradhapura and Gampaha gained one seat each while Colombo and Kurunegala lost a seat each.

== Contesting parties ==
All the constituent parties of the ruling UPFA contested under its banner. The parliamentary opposition parties (the United National Front, Janatha Vimukthi Peramuna and Tamil National Alliance), who had come together to support common opposition candidate Sarath Fonseka at the presidential election, were unable to form a common alliance to contest in the election. Therefore, the UNF and the TNA contested alone, while Fonseka and the JVP allied to form a new alliance called the Democratic National Alliance (DNA). Fonseka was the DNA's chief candidate in Colombo district.

The UPFA, UNF and DNA contested in all 22 electoral districts while the TNA contested in the 5 districts in the north and east. The UNF contested under the name and symbol of the United National Party, as it had done in the previous two parliamentary elections. The TNA contested under the name and symbol of the Illankai Tamil Arasu Kachchi, as it did in the last parliamentary election.

A record 7,680 candidates contested for the 196 district seats.

== Violence and violations of election laws ==
Sri Lankan elections have a history of violence, misuse of state resources, and other violations of election laws. 274 incidents had been reported to the police up to 5 April. The Centre for Monitoring Election Violence (CMEV) recorded 413 incidents up to 7 April. The CMEV has stated that it is impossible to say if the election had been "free and fair". People's Action for Free and Fair Elections (PAFFREL) recorded 270 incidents up to 7 April. The Campaign for Free and Fair Elections (CaFFE) has stated that the election was not free and fair. CaFFE condemned the police and election commissioner for not enforcing electoral law. The Asian Network for Free Elections (ANFREL) also recorded a number of violations. A significant feature of the violence was intra-party clashes between UPFA candidates.

On the day of the election, there were a number of elections violations reported around the country. The violations in the Nawalapitiya electorate of the Kandy District were serious enough for the Elections Commissioner to nullify the voting in some areas of the electorate and order a re-poll. Results from the Trincomalee District were also suspended as some ballot papers had been stolen. Re-polling for the effected polling areas took place on April 20.

== Results ==
Party	Votes	%	Seats		
Party	Votes	%	District	National	Total
United People's Freedom Alliance (Note: Consisting of the All Ceylon Muslim Congress, the Ceylon Workers' Congress, the Eelam People's Democratic Party (which contested separately in Vanni), Jathika Hela Urumaya, Mahajana Eksath Peramuna, the National Congress, the National Freedom Front, the Socialist Alliance (the Communist Party of Sri Lanka, the Democratic Left Front, Lanka Sama Samaja Party, the National Liberation People's Party and the Sri Lanka People's Party), the Sri Lanka Freedom Party and the Up-Country People's Front (which contested separately in Badulla and Nuwara Eliya).)	4,846,388	60.33	127	17	144
United National Front (Note: Contested under the name and symbol of United National Party. It also included the Citizen's Front, the Democratic People's Front, the National Union of Workers and the Sri Lanka Muslim Congress).)	2,357,057	29.34	51	9	60
Democratic National Alliance (Note: Including Janatha Vimukthi Peramuna.)	441,251	5.49	5	2	7
Tamil National Alliance (Note: Contested under the name and symbol of Illankai Tamil Arasu Kachchi. It also consisted of the Eelam People's Revolutionary Liberation Front and the Tamil Eelam Liberation Organization.)	233,190	2.90	13	1	14
Up-Country People's Front	24,670	0.31	0	0	0
Tamil Makkal Viduthalai Pulikal	20,284	0.25	0	0	0
Sinhalaye Mahasammatha Bhoomiputra Pakshaya	12,170	0.15	0	0	0
Tamil United Liberation Front	9,223	0.11	0	0	0
Tamil National People's Front (Note: Contested under the name and symbol of All Ceylon Tamil Congress.)	7,544	0.09	0	0	0
Democratic People's Liberation Front (Note: Including the People's Liberation Organisation of Tamil Eelam.)	6,036	0.08	0	0	0
Sri Lanka National Front	5,313	0.07	0	0	0
Eelavar Democratic Front	3,709	0.05	0	0	0
Jathika Sangwardhena Peramuna	3,358	0.04	0	0	0
Eelam People's Democratic Party	2,867	0.04	0	0	0
Our National Front	2,647	0.03	0	0	0
United National Alternative Front	2,454	0.03	0	0	0
Eksath Lanka Podujana Pakshaya	2,387	0.03	0	0	0
Left Liberation Front	2,386	0.03	0	0	0
United Socialist Party	2,192	0.03	0	0	0
Pathmanabha Eelam Revolutionary Liberation Front	2,100	0.03	0	0	0
Jana Setha Peramuna	1,501	0.02	0	0	0
United Democratic Front	1,497	0.02	0	0	0
Democratic Unity Alliance	1,270	0.02	0	0	0
Eksath Lanka Maha Sabha	673	0.01	0	0	0
Patriotic National Front	558	0.01	0	0	0
Okkoma Wasiyo Okkoma Rajawaru Sanvidanaya	476	0.01	0	0	0
Socialist Equality Party	371	0.00	0	0	0
Sri Lanka Labour Party	338	0.00	0	0	0
National Peoples Party	164	0.00	0	0	0
Muslim National Alliance	147	0.00	0	0	0
The Liberal Party	131	0.00	0	0	0
Muslim Liberation Front	130	0.00	0	0	0
Ruhunu Janatha Party	109	0.00	0	0	0
Akila Ilankai Tamil United Front	85	0.00	0	0	0
Ceylon Democratic Unity Alliance	75	0.00	0	0	0
New Sinhala Heritage	19	0.00	0	0	0
Independents	38,947	0.48	0	0	0
Total	8,033,717	100.00	196	29	225
Valid votes	8,033,717	93.08			
Invalid/blank votes	596,972	6.92			
Total votes	8,630,689	100.00			
Registered voters/turnout	14,088,500	61.26			
Source: Election Commission, Election Commission

=== By district ===
District by district results of the 2010 Sri Lankan parliamentary election
District	Province	UPFA			UNF			DNA			TNA			Others	Total seats	Turnout
District	Province	Votes	Seats	+/-	Votes	Seats	+/-	Votes	Seats	+/-	Votes	Seats	+/-	Seats	Total seats	Turnout
Colombo	Western	480,896	10	+2	339,750	7	−2	110,683	2	+2	DNC			0	19	65%
Gampaha	Western	589,476	12	+3	266,523	5	−1	69,747	1	+1	DNC			0	18	67%
Kalutara	Western	313,836	7	+1	139,596	2	−1	36,722	1	+1	DNC			0	10	67%
Mahanuwara	Central	339,819	8	+3	192,798	4	−2	23,728	0	-	DNC			0	12	64%
Matale	Central	131,069	4	+1	55,737	1	−1	7,636	0	-	DNC			0	5	60%
Nuwara Eliya	Central	149,111	5	+3	96,885	2	− 2	3,984	0	-	DNC			0	7	66%
Galle	Southern	305,307	7	+1	120,101	2	−2	33,663	1	+1	DNC			0	10	64%
Matara	Southern	213,937	6	+1	91,114	2	−1	20,465	0	-	DNC			0	8	59%
Hambantota	Southern	174,808	5	-	83,027	2	-	19,186	0	-	DNC			0	7	69%
Jaffna	Northern	47,622	3	+3	12,624	1	+1	201	0	-	65,119	5	−3	0	9	23%
Vanni	Northern	37,522	2	+2	12,783	1	-	301	0	-	41,673	3	−2	0	6	44%
Batticaloa	Eastern	62,009	1	+1	22,935	1	+1	324	0	-	66,235	3	−1	0	5	59%
Digamadulla	Eastern	132,096	4	+1	90,757	2	+1	2,917	0	-	26,895	1	-	0	7	74%
Trincomalee	Eastern	59,784	2	+1	39,691	1	+1	2,519	0	-	33,268	1	−1	0	4	62%
Kurunegala	North Western	429,316	10	+1	213,713	5	−2	26,440	0	-	DNC			0	15	61%
Puttalam	North Western	167,769	6	+1	81,152	2	−1	8,792	0	-	DNC			0	8	57%
Anuradhapura	North Central	221,204	7	+2	80,360	2	−1	18,129	0	-	DNC			0	9	61%
Polonnauwa	North Central	118,694	4	+1	45,732	1	−1	6,457	0	-	DNC			0	5	66%
Badulla	Uva	203,689	6	+3	112,886	2	−3	15,768	0	-	DNC			0	8	65%
Monaragala	Uva	120,634	4	+1	28,892	1	−1	9,018	0	-	DNC			0	5	56%
Ratnapura	Sabaragamuwa	305,327	7	+1	125,076	3	−1	11,053	0	-	DNC			0	10	65%
Kegalle	Sabaragamuwa	242,463	7	+2	104,925	2	−2	13,518	0	-	DNC			0	9	63%
National List		17		+4	9		−2	2		+2	1		−1	0	29	-
Total		4,846,388	144	+39	2,357,057	60	−22	441,251	7	+7	233,190	14	−8	0	225	61%
Source: Sri Lanka Department of Elections Archived 2010-04-14 at the Wayback Machine

== See also ==
- Results of the 2010 Sri Lankan general election by electoral district
- Results of the 2010 Sri Lankan general election by province
