= Sri Lankan civil war in popular culture =

With the Sri Lankan Civil War spanning for nearly 30 years (1983–2009), the conflict has been portrayed in a variety of ways in popular culture, both during the war and after its conclusion.

== Literature ==
=== Biographies ===
- Tamil Tigress (2011), by Niromi de Soyza

=== Non-fiction ===
- This Divided Island (2015), by Samanth Subramanian
- Island of Blood (2003), by Anita Pratap
- The Tamil Genocide by Sri Lanka (2009), by Francis Boyle
- The Cage (2011), by Gordon Weiss
- Still Counting the Dead (2012), by Frances Harrison
- Gota’s War: The Crushing of Tamil Tiger Terrorism in Sri Lanka (2012), by C. A. Chandraprema
- Dare to Dream - Heroic Tales for the Tamil Diaspora (2012), by J. K. Sivalingam
- A Fleeting Moment in My Country (2012), by N. Malathy

=== Novels ===
- Tech War (Able Team) (1985), by Dick Stivers
- Funny Boy (1994), by Shyam Selvadurai
- The Road from Elephant Pass (2003), by Nihal De Silva
- Island of a Thousand Mirrors (2012), by Nayomi Munaweera
- Ummath (2014), by Sharmila Seyyid
- The Story of a Brief Marriage (2016), by Anuk Arudpragasam
- The Seven Moons of Maali Almeida (2022), by Shehan Karunatilaka
- Brotherless Night (2023), by V. V. Ganeshananthan

== Film & TV ==
=== Films ===
- Unakkaga Piranthen (1992), directed by Balu Anand
- Purahanda Kaluwara (1997), directed by Prasanna Vithanage
- Saroja (2000), directed by Somaratne Dissanayake
- In the Name of Buddha (2002), directed by Rajesh Touchriver
- Kannathil Muthamittal (2002), directed by Mani Ratnam
- Ira Madiyama (2003), directed by Prasanna Vithanage
- Aanivaer (2006), directed by John Mahendran
- Kuttrapathirikai (2007), directed by R. K. Selvamani
- Prabhakaran (2008), directed by Thushara Peiris
- The Road from Elephant Pass (2008), directed by Chandran Rutnam
- Flying Fish (2011), directed by Sanjeewa Pushpakumara
- Matha (2011), directed by Boodee Keerthisena
- A Common Man (2013), directed by Chandran Rutnam
- Madras Cafe (2013), directed by John Abraham
- Ceylon (2013), directed by Santosh Sivan
- Dheepan (2015), directed by Jacques Audiard
- A Private War (2018), directed by Matthew Heineman

=== Documentaries ===
- Crayons and Paper (2009), directed by Bruce David Janu
- Unholy Ground (2010), directed by Ken Miller
- Sri Lanka's Killing Fields (2011), directed by Callum Macrae
- Lies Agreed Upon (2011), by the Sri Lankan Ministry of Defence
- Sri Lanka's Killing Fields: War Crimes Unpunished (2012), directed by Callum Macrae
- Ruthless (2012), by the Sri Lankan Ministry of Defence
- No Fire Zone (2013), directed by Callum Macrae
- Sri Lanka's Unfinished War (2013), by the BBC
- Killing the Travellers: Kurukkalmadam Massacre (2024), directed by Baazir Kaleelur Rahman

=== Animation ===
- Mobile Suit Gundam 00 (2007), by Sunrise, Inc.

== Music ==
- Poradada Oru Valenthada, song from Alai Osai (1985)
- Tholvi Nilaiyena, song from Oomai Vizhigal (1986)
- Lions and Tigers (1997), song by Brown Boogie Nation
- Sebalanani (2009), song by Ranidu Lankage
- Born Free (2010), song by M.I.A.

== Video games ==
- Tom Clancy's Ghost Recon Predator (2010)
- NERO: The Sniper (2021)

== See also ==
- List of films about the Tamil genocide
