= List of films about the Tamil genocide =

This is a filmography for films and artistry on the graphic, theatrical and conventional, documental portrayal of the Tamil genocide against the Sri Lankan Tamils. All the listed films and documentaries are directly related only to Tamil genocide.

== Films ==
- In the Name of Buddha (2002) - This satirical drama film directed by Rajesh Touchriver and produced by K. Shanmughathas and Sai George. The film is about a true story of a Sri Lankan Tamil doctor named Siva.
- Dheepan (2015) - A French crime drama film directed by Jacques Audiard tells the story of three Tamil refugees who flee the civil war-ravaged Sri Lanka and come to France, in the hope of reconstructing their lives.
- Sinamkol (2020) - The protagonist, Amudhan, search for his family post-detention under Sri Lanka's regime, intertwined with the challenges faced by a Tamil diaspora family in post-war Tamil Eelam. This movie has won 3 international awards.

== Documentaries ==
- Sri Lanka's Unfinished War
- Sri Lanka's Killing Fields
- Sri Lanka's Killing Fields: War Crimes Unpunished
- I Witnessed Genocide: Inside Sri Lanka's Killing Fields
- This Land Belongs to the Army
- No Fire Zone
- My Daughter the Terrorist
- Sri Lanka's Rebel Wife
- Sri Lanka: The Search for Justice
- The Dark Corners of Sri Lanka - A documentary by Centre for Promotion and Protection of Human Rights (CPPHR) about the ones suffered or died under torture in Sri Lanka. It was directed by Yogeswaran Veerasen
- Haunted By Her Yesterdays
- A Sri Lankan woman's search for her missing husband
- Sri Lankan civil war: Damilvany's story
- White Van Stories: Sri Lanka's disappeared
- Ray of Hope

== Short films ==
- Vanni Mouse (2009), directed by Tamiliam Subas - The journey inseparable couple mice end unfortunately in an internment camp (Manik Farm) located in Vavuniya (Sri Lanka) where hundreds of thousands tamils are imprisoned by the Sri Lankan government.

== See also ==
- Sri Lankan civil war in popular culture
