= Lies Agreed Upon =

Sri Lankan state-produced documentary about the Sri Lankan Civil War

- Screenshot
- Genre: Documentary
- Presented by: Minoli Ratnayake
- Narrated by: Minoli Ratnayake
- Country of origin: Sri Lanka
- Original languages: English; Tamil
- No. of episodes: 2

Production
- Producer: Ministry of Defence, Sri Lanka
- Production location: Sri Lanka
- Running time: 56 minutes

Original release
- Release: 1 August 2011

Related
- Ruthless

Lies Agreed Upon is a documentary produced by Sri Lanka Ministry of Defence in response to a documentary aired by Channel 4, named Sri Lanka's Killing Fields, about the final weeks of the Sri Lankan Civil War. The documentary gives the Sri Lanka Ministry of Defence response to war crimes accusations and rebuts points made by the producers of the Channel 4 documentary, who presented it as "a forensic investigation into the final weeks of the quarter-century-long civil war between the government of Sri Lanka and the secessionist rebels, the Tamil Tigers." Lies Agreed Upon was first aired at an official function held at Hilton Colombo on 1 August 2011, one and half months after the broadcasting of "Sri Lanka's Killing Fields". Ministry of Defence released another report named Humanitarian Operation – Factual Analysis : July 2006 – May 2009 on the same day.

The documentary shows a number of interviews given by ex-LTTE cadres, ex-IDPs, residents of Vanni area, government doctors who worked inside the LTTE held territory during the period etc. It also includes criticism of the eyewitnesses produced by the Channel 4 video and the alleged "trophy videos" by Sri Lankan soldiers. International Crisis Group reacted to the documentary stating, government’s challenge to Channel 4′s reporting is far from the successful refutation, and raises more questions than it answers. In November 2013 Channel 4 showed No Fire Zone, a further documentary examining the last 138 days of the war which challenged the government narrative and which included further evidence of the Sri Lankan government's brutality. Though the government barred independent journalists from the No Fire Zones during the endgame of the conflict, mobile phones, used by both victims and perpetrators, captured the story.

== Background ==
In June 2011, Channel 4 broadcast the documentary named Sri Lanka's Killing Fields, produced and directed by Callum Macrae which made a number of allegations about the final stages of the Sri Lankan Civil War. It had a negative impact on the reputation of the Sri Lankan government and the Sri Lanka Armed Forces. The documentary Channel 4 claimed that the government was responsible for targeted shelling of civilians, extrajudicial executions of prisoners and rape, sexual assault and murder of female LTTE fighters. The presenter Jon Snow claimed that the government was responsible for the deaths of as many as 40,000 civilians towards the end of the war. He went so far as to claim that "[o]nce or twice in a reporting lifetime, a journalist is allowed by events to participate in a project that can affect history. The film...is a painful and complex team achievement...which...pieced together an account of what happened in the closing weeks of Sri Lanka’s civil war." The resulting backlash prompted the Sri Lankan government to produce its own documentary, highlighting the alleged inaccuracies and the facts that may have been potentially missed or concealed by the producers of the Channel 4 documentary.

== Special screenings ==
A special screening of the documentary Lies Agreed Upon was held at the United States Congress, at a gathering hosted by the Congressional Caucus on Sri Lanka and Sri Lankan Americans on 2 November 2011. The screening included a panel discussion of Sri Lanka's 26-year conflict. The event was attended by a representative gathering including congressional representatives, NGOs, human rights groups, congressional staff members, professionals and members of the Sri Lankan community.

The documentary Lies Agreed Upon was also screened at the Attlee Suite, Portcullis House of the British parliament on 12 October 2011. The event was organized by the Sri Lanka High Commission in London. It was followed by a dialogue with Prof. Rajiva Wijesinha, and Sir Peter Heap, Chairman, Friends of Sri Lanka group in the European Parliament. The audience consisted of British parliamentarians, representatives from academia, some media representatives including from Channel 4, and a cross-section of the Sri Lankan Diaspora.

Another screening was held at the Dag Hammarskjold Auditorium of United Nations Headquarters, at the invitation of the president of the United Nations Correspondents Association, on 6 September 2011.

The documentary Lies Agreed Upon was screened at the Parliament of New Zealand (Beehive) on 28 September 2011. The session was organized by the United Sri Lanka Association in New Zealand.

It was also screened at a side event titled "Sri Lanka - Humanitarian Operation: A Factual Analysis", organized on the margins of the 18th session of United Nations Human Rights Council in Geneva by the Permanent Mission of Sri Lanka to the United Nations in Geneva. The President of the Maldives Mohamed Nasheed speaking at the event urged the international community to support the reconciliation process being implemented in Sri Lanka. A cross section of member countries of the Human Rights Council, INGOs and civil society organizations participated in this event.

== Content ==
=== Rebuttal of Sri Lanka's Killing Fields ===
The documentary offered counter arguments for a number of allegations made by the Channel 4 documentary.

==== Introduction ====
The documentary Lies Agreed Upon claimed that the title used by Channel 4, Killing Fields, was specifically drawn up to evoke memories of the Khmer Rouge regime, which controlled Cambodia from 1975 to 1979. In addition, Channel 4 did not claim ownership of any of the footage, facts, figures, faces or names that it broadcast. According to Lies Agreed Upon the presenter of the Sri Lanka's Killing Fields constantly referred to the Liberation Tigers of Tamil Eelam (LTTE), the defeated party of the Sri Lankan Civil War, as "army", whereas it did not have any legitimate authority over the territory it controlled and was proscribed as a terrorist organization by 32 countries.

==== United Nations office demonstration ====
At the very beginning of the Channel 4 documentary, it was shown that a footage of a protest in front of the United Nations office in Kilinochchi. The presenter claimed "News that the UN international staff leaving, spread quickly, and crowds of frightened Tamil civilians besieged the UN base..". Lies Agreed Upon refuted the claim providing with interviews of Tamil civilians who actually took part in the demonstration. Those civilians described that the demonstration was not at all spontaneous, but was organized by the LTTE. One person claimed that Kalaiyvan, the LTTE leader of Kilinochchi, summoned the heads of all 16 trade associations in the district and instructed them to stage the protest at the 150th milestone at Arasankatty, where the UN office was located. Another person claimed that people had no say about such matters when the area was under LTTE control. "We must do as told. If they ask, we have to open, if they ask to close we must close. If we do not obey we will have to stop doing our business..".

The government documentary also alleged that the Channel 4 documentary tried to imply, the residents of Vanni were left with no refuge by the abandoning of the UN office. Benjamin Dix, a British UN worker, quite emotionally stated that "It was their greatest hour of need. They had an army sitting on the doorstep...and we drove out. That was ...a real sense of abandonment of these people". But according to the government version of the sequence of events, UN staff of about 200 and their families continued to serve in the area until the end. Sri Lanka's Killing Fields also failed to mention that the Tamil UN staffers and their families had been held hostage by the LTTE. As the battle came closer to the end, 9 UN staffers were forcibly recruited by the LTTE for their auxiliary forces, the government documentary added.

==== Casualty figures ====
According to the Channel 4 documentary, "..the deaths of as many as 40,000 people..possibly far more.." could have occurred by the end of the war. Refuting this claim, Lies Agreed Upon stated that Gordon Weiss, the former UN spokesman based on Colombo, who commented on high casualty rates, was asked to leave by the Government of Sri Lanka on 12 May 2009. By this time, the UN had an official estimate of about 7,000 casualties during the final 4 months of war. One year after his resignation, Weiss came up with a figure of 10,000 to 40,000 casualties, at a time when he was involved in promoting his upcoming book, The Cage. But the UN, which treated Weiss as a junior official, specifically disassociated itself from the comment.

The documentary Lies Agreed Upon also claimed that all the reports of deaths during the final stages of the war had come from either the LTTE media, or the 4 government doctors who were held hostage by the LTTE.

==== Credibility of Vany Kumar ====
Lies Agreed Upon also raised questions about the credibility of Vany Kumar, the central witness of the Channel 4 documentary. Jon Snow of Channel 4 introduced herself as "a young English Tamil woman, who had left London to spend 6 months with [her] relatives in Sri Lanka". She appeared on 10 separate occasions in the program, and was presented as an "independent witness" who had firsthand experience of the final days of war. But refuting the Channel 4 claims, the government documentary asserted that she had worked as a full-time and active member of an LTTE terrorist cell in London. Government investigations had revealed that Vany Kumar, who had gone by at least 4 different names including Dr. Tamilvani, Damilvany Kumar and Damilvany Gananakumar, arrived in Sri Lanka on 28 February 2008. She had worked as the woman coordinator of the UK Tamil Youth Organization (TYO), an LTTE front organization. Documentary "Lies Agreed Upon" claimed, citing one of her former colleagues, Navaratnam Prabhakaran alias Sendramalar, that after Kumar's arrival in Vanni, she underwent one month of weapons training and was enlisted under Sothiya regiment of LTTE. She had also possessed a dog tag with a cardre number issued by the Sothiya regiment, and a cyanide capsule. She had also worked for the Castro branch of the LTTE international wing. According to the government documentary, by April 2009, when the LTTE was rapidly losing ground to the Sri Lankan Army she joined the medical facility under Dr. Shanmugaraja, a government doctor worked inside LTTE held area, and served there until 15 May 2009.

==== Shells fallen on medical facilities ====
Another key interviewee of the Channel 4 documentary, Gordon Weiss, who appeared on eight separate video clips of the program, alleged that there had been 65 instances of shelling on hospitals and makeshift medical facilities. According to the documentary Lies Agreed Upon, refuting these claims, Dr. Shanmugaraja said that he could only remember four instances of shelling; one on Vallipuram hospital, one on Puthukkudiyiruppu hospital, one on Mullivaikkal West makeshift hospital and one on Mullivaikkal East makeshift hospital. The doctor strongly denied and condemned Weiss's claim that he requested the International Committee of the Red Cross (ICRC) not to provide GPS coordinates of the medical facilities to the Sri Lankan Army. Giving an interview to the Lies Agreed Upon, Dr. Sivapalan, medical officer of Chavakacheri and former medical officer - Vanni, claimed that LTTE had its commanding centres from within 100 metres of Puthukkudiyiruppu hospital, in which 2 artillery shells had fallen in February 2009. He also asserted that LTTE used heavy artillery as close as possible to the hospitals.

==== Corpse of Isaipriya ====
In one of the alleged "trophy videos" aired by Channel 4, the dead body of an LTTE female cadre named Isaipriya was shown. Narrator described her an LTTE non-combatant who sang songs glorifying suicide bombing. But refuting the Channel 4 assertion, the government documentary claimed that she was a high-profile LTTE cardre, tasked to handle the motivation of suicide Black Tigers. According to the government, disrobing dead LTTE militants was a part of the standard operating procedure adopted by Sri Lankan military, as well as many armies fighting terrorism, since it is necessary for searching hidden weapons, suicide jackets and documents. The documentary Lies Agreed Upon cited Death of Osama bin Laden as an instance for the use of this practice.

==== Corpse of Ramesh ====
Sri Lanka's Killing Fields also showed the corpse of T. Thurairajasingham alias Col. Ramesh, a senior leader of LTTE, and the overall military commander of Eastern province, suggesting that he had been killed after being captured. The documentary Lies Agreed Upon contained a brief description of the massacres they accused him of giving leadership to, including the Kattankudy mosque massacre, which left 147 Muslim civilians who had knelt for prayer, killed on the spot, Habarana bus massacre which left 127 passengers dead, and Aranthalawa Massacre which left 35 Buddhist monks dead. The government documentary criticized the Sri Lanka's Killing Fields for failing to mention those atrocities which they accused Col. Ramesh of supervising.

==== State of IDP camps ====
Jon Snow's description of the Sri Lankan IDP camps was that "[they] were brutal places, where stories of rape, violence and disappearances were rife". Contradicting the Channel 4 claims, Lies Agreed Upon featured a number of interviews with present and past female IDPs who said that they were treated well by the Army. They did not agree with the claims that rape, violence and disappearance were rife inside those camps.

==== Execution videos ====
Commenting on the alleged "trophy videos" featuring blindfolded LTTE cadres killed by men in military uniforms, the presenter said that "who killed whom, this much is known, over 11,000 LTTE cardre and their families surrendered to the Army. None of them were harmed..." The government documentary vehemently rejected the authenticity of these videos, alleging that those were stage-managed.

=== Facts and figures ===
==== Casualty figures ====
The documentary Lies Agreed Upon estimated the number of total casualties in the Vanni area during the final stages of the war, using approximate number of persons lived in 2008 and the number of people came out of the region after the Sri Lankan armed forces took control of it in May 2009. It quoted several sources for the number of people lived in the region by late 2008.

- United Nations residential coordinator - 180,000
- Centre for Humanitarian Agencies (UNOCHA) - 150,000
- United Nations-Under Secretary at United Nations Security Council - 190,000
- World Food Programme - 230,000
- INGO and UN agencies in January - 250,000
- Government Agent in Vanni - 305,000

It claimed that even the figure of around 300,000 people, which was generally accepted by the end of the war, too was inflated by the LTTE to secure greater volumes of food and medical supplies from the government. The total number of registered persons in the IDP cams was 293,800. Going with the 300,000 figure and taking into account the 4,600 LTTE cadre killed in combat, the total number of persons accounted for, was 99.46%. Rest of the casualties also includes the civilians died in crossfire, those who were shot dead by the LTTE as they tried to flee, and those who fled the country at the end of the war using sea routes. Therefore, the documentary concluded that the civilian casualty figure of 40,000 was not only improbable, but also impossible.

=== Special footage ===
The documentary Lies Agreed Upon produced several video clips that had allegedly been found in possession of a dead LTTE cardre, showing LTTE persons firing pedal guns in civilian clothes.

It also included another footage showing LTTE suicide bomber Sujatha Vagawanam detonating herself in an attempt to kill Sri Lankan minister Douglas Devananda.

It also showed aerial footage taken by Sri Lanka Air Force unmanned aerial vehicles on 21 April 2009, depicting LTTE cadres shooting at Tamil civilians trying to escape from the Tiger held area.

An LTTE suicide attack on a civilian receiving centre on 9 February 2009 which left 17 people dead was also featured in the documentary.

=== Interviews ===
==== Government doctors ====
The 4 government doctors who worked at the LTTE controlled territory during the final days of the war, giving interviews to the documentary Lies Agreed Upon, recanted their earlier statements on the number of deaths. Dr, Sathiyamoorthy, medical superintend of the Vavuniya General hospital, and former RDHS of Kilinochchi stated "Sometimes they [LTTE] are coming with a list of casualty numbers and dead numbers and they ask [us] to give [the] details..". Dr. Shanmugaraja, the medical officer (anesthesia) of Teaching Hospital, Jaffna and former RDHS of Mullaitivu said that "When LTTE asked me to put the figure as 1,000, I said that it is totally unacceptable and that I have not gone and seen such numbers". Documentary Lies Agreed Upon claimed, he also refuted the claims of Channel 4 witness Vany Kumar, who alleged that he cut off the leg of a 6-year-old boy without giving local anesthetic, (laughingly) saying "We did not conduct any sort of surgery without giving anesthesia. That would've killed the boy".

According to the documentary Lies Agreed Upon, Dr. Sivapalan said that LTTE controlled Tamil Eelam Administrative Service took over a major portion of food and medical items that had been sent by the government for the use of civilians in the area. He went into elaborate that he once appealed to the LTTE leader Pulidevan to release to innocent Tamil civilians who had been forcibly held by the LTTE. They did not heed his calls. "They said they are the protectors of Tamils, but at last they had started to fire at people, and they killed a lot of civilians. I saw that...", the doctor added

A government doctor later accused the government of forcing them to recant the high death tolls under duress.

==== Residents of Vanni ====
A resident of Kilinochchi recalled his memories of the period, giving an interview to Lies Agreed Upon, saying "people were desperate and were taking every effort to escape. I saw people falling dead due to the LTTE gunfire while attempting to escape. Many were fleeing during the midnight and attempting to cross the lagoon [Nandikadal Lagoon] were shot at point-blank range. I saw two bodies of youngsters shot dead and dragged near the Pillayar Kovil at Mathalan near the beach..."

Among the residents of Vanni, who were forcibly held by the LTTE, was Sathasivam Kanagaratnam, a former Tamil National Alliance Mullaitivu District MP. He described his experience with the producers of the documentary: "I witnessed the LTTE extensively engaged in the forcible recruitment of the underaged children who were given a week's arms training and pushed to the battlefront.. I saw how children were nabbed while parents were wailing.."

==== Ex-LTTEers and family members ====
Ex-LTTE members who had been preparing for their GCE Advanced Level examinations and those who were undergoing vocational training, had been featured in the documentary. Kuchadarshini Arumeinadan, an ex-LTTE combatant who surrendered to the Sri Lanka Army 58 Division, who had also been featured on a footage, speaking with the division commander Major general Shavendra Silva on the day of her surrender, described that although she had feared for her life at that day, she had not been harmed, but was treated humanely.

Sasirekha, the wife of the former leader of the LTTE political wing S. P. Thamilselvan, giving an interview to the documentary told that she had been treated well by the Army. She said she had been treated for a growing abdominal pain at the National hospital, Colombo and her children attend an international school in Colombo. She also said she has no plans to migrate to India or UK, to live the rest of her life.

Sathyadevi, the wife of the leader of the Sea Tigers, Thillaiyampalam Sivanesan alias Soosai, said that she never thought the government would treat them this well. Although she and her family were depressed initially, their fears turned out to be untrue.

Velayutham Dayanidhi alias Daya Master, the head of the media division of LTTE, giving an interview to the "Lies Agreed Upon", revealed that "Whenever a Tamil civilian or any other individual from a different Tamil fraction was caught defying LTTE rules, the LTTE used to shoot them wearing Army uniforms. And often LTTE cadres wearing uniforms similar to the military attacked both Sinhalese and Tamil villages. Tamil villages were attacked in-order to create fear psychos among the civilians towards the Army."

The ex-LTTE cadre who was in charge of the prison at Victor base in Vallimulli, was also featured revealing that 26 military prisoners (18 Army, 8 Navy) were massacred on orders of Prabhakaran on 16 January 2009.

=== Continued operations of LTTE ===
The documentary Lies Agreed Upon concluded with a brief description of the continued operations and the present administrative structure of the LTTE. A former cadre of the LTTE international wing revealed that, Veerakathy Manivannam alias Castro, the head of the LTTE international wing, was the one who formed Tamil Youth Organizations (TYOs) in the Western countries with a huge Sri Lankan Tamil diaspora. This was done in-order to reach the international community without much problem, as most of the TYO members were born and bred there. People who worked earlier in those countries were not effective because they weren't familiar with their system. According to the documentary, Father S. J. Emmanuel, President of the Global Tamil Forum made 2 or 3 visits to Sri Lanka to meet with Castro and once he conducted classes at the Nathan base on how to deal with the diaspora from Vanni. The cardre also claimed that TNA parliamentarian M. K. Eelaventhan liaised for the Father Emmanuel's visits. The documentary revealed details of the persons who run the global network of the defeated LTTE outfit; Perinpanayagam Sivaparan alias Nediyavan of the Tamil Eelam People's Alliance (TEPA) in Norway, Suren Surendiran of British Tamils Forum (BTF), Father S. J. Emmanuel of Global Tamil Forum (GTF), Visvanathan Rudrakumaran of Transnational Government of Tamil Eelam (TGTE) and Sekarapillai Vinayagamoorthy alias Kathirgamathamby Arivazhagan alias Vinayagam, a former senior LTTE intelligence leader.

== Criticism ==
Criticism of Lies Agreed Upon was particularly based on the apparent non-independent status of some of its witnesses. The LTTE cadres interviewed, had trials been pending at the time of their interview. Thus it would make them unlikely to make any statement not in favour of the Sri Lankan government. And the 4 government doctors who provided details of the conditions in the LTTE held area during the final stages of the war, had been detained by the Criminal Investigation Department (CID) of Sri Lanka Police after they escaped the clutches of LTTE. Less than two months after they gave a press conference, recanting their earlier statements, the doctors were released, and reinstated in their profession.

Contradicting the documentary's characterization of IDP camps, V. Anandasangaree, the leader of the Tamil United Liberation Front and an outspoken critic of LTTE claimed that "the conditions were 'good' in some camps and 'horrible' in many others" "Health, water and sanitation situation is horrible. Many people have skin diseases as they don't get a chance to have a shower for days because of water shortage. Pregnant mothers and newborn babies go through a harrowing time in the camps due to scorching heat". Former Chief Justice, Sarath N. Silva also pointed out the abysmal conditions in some camps.

The casualty figures also came under criticism, referring to government's claims in April 2009 that only 70,000 people were in the LTTE controlled territory. 37,000 people had fled the areas by then, leaving more than 185,000 people underestimated as when they came out of the area.

== Reaction ==
International Crisis Group, making a statement on the documentary, said that "nothing in the program that disproves, and little that even challenges directly, the many specific credible allegations – including those in the report of the UN Secretary-General’s panel of experts on accountability – that in 2009 the government shelled Tamil civilian concentrations and hospitals, executed surrendering cadres and LTTE political leaders, and failed to provide adequate humanitarian supplies to the civilian population". However it also noted that "The government’s film makes clear that so long as campaigners for justice and peace in the Tamil diaspora do not clearly recognise the crimes of the LTTE and clearly repudiate their violent forms of militant struggle, and the damage it did to all communities in Sri Lanka, their efforts towards justice will remain weak".

== Aftermath ==
Sri Lanka Ministry of Defence, in February 2012 released a follow up to the documentary, named Ruthless. This documentary focused on two incidents during the final stages of war; the attack on St. Mary's Church at Valayanamadam in March 2009 and abduction of 600 under-aged children who were taking refuge there, and detonation of buses filled with injured LTTE cadres by the LTTE itself.

== See also ==
- Sri Lanka's Killing Fields
- Sri Lankan Civil War
