= Sri Lanka's Unfinished War =

- Country of origin: United Kingdom
- Original language: English

Production
- Running time: 30 minutes

Original release
- Network: BBC World News
- Release: 9 November 2013

Sri Lanka's Unfinished War is a 2013 documentary examining the alleged genocide and crimes against humanity against Sri Lankan Tamils by the Sri Lankan Government. It was presented by Frances Harrison former BBC correspondent to Sri Lanka, and was first screened on the BBC World News on 9 November 2013. Sri Lanka's Unfinished War which presents harrowing cases of testimony from interviewees, brings to light evidence on the systematic post-war rape and torture in detention, organized by the State on the Tamil minority in Sri Lanka. The Sri Lankan Government denied the evidence that was put forth to them from the video.

== Content ==
The thirty-minute documentary exhibited witness statements of men and women that alleged to have faced rape and torture by the Sri Lankan forces as recently as August 2013. Victims say they were kidnapped, raped, burned with cigarettes, suffocated, beaten with pipes and burned with metal rods and forced to sign confessions in a language they couldn’t understand. Independent experts and medical reports verified the accounts of the victims to be credible and legitimate.

=== Victim accounts ===
Harrowing accounts of the victims appear throughout the documentary. One victim, Nandini stated that, she was picked up from her home earlier this year, driven blindfolded in a van and repeatedly raped by a succession of men in military and civilian clothing. Dr Alison Callaway, a doctor who is an expert witness for the UK courts and who had investigated over 200 cases of alleged torture from Sri Lanka in the last five years, concluded the physical and psychological evidence corroborated her story of recent rape and torture.

Another victim Ravi who was detained for 4 years under the Government's 'rehabilitation' program, claimed that he was beaten, suffocated and abused severely while in the military's custody.

Siva, who has papers to prove when and where he was held by the Government, also was subjected to such intense torture and abuse before he could move out of the country.

== Observations ==
Analyzing findings from the BBC, United Nations and other human rights groups, a leading British lawyer Kirsty Brimelow said:

It all equates to a crime against humanity and therefore in cases like this, normally you’d be looking at them being referred to the international criminal court for further investigation

Charu Lata Hogg, Associate Fellow Chatham House, who wrote the report, tells the programme:

There were enough pointers in the evidence that we gathered that showed quite clearly that this issue of sexual violence was not perpetrated by rogue officers, or were random acts of violence. There was a level of coordination and a level of, a pattern of abuse which was systematic across all the cases

== See also ==
- Sri Lanka's Killing Fields
- Sri Lanka's Killing Fields: War Crimes Unpunished
- No Fire Zone
