= Killing field (disambiguation) =

Killing field may also refer to:

- Killing Fields, a number of sites in Cambodia where collectively more than a million people were killed and buried by the Khmer Rouge regime, during its rule of the country from 1975 to 1979
- Texas Killing Fields, a location in Texas that is the scene of 30+ murders, mostly unsolved

== Media ==
- The Killing Fields (film), a 1984 drama about the Cambodian Killing Fields
  - The Killing Fields (soundtrack), by Mike Oldfield, a soundtrack album to the film
  - The Killing Fields: The Facts Behind the Film, a book by Sydney Schanberg
- Sri Lanka's Killing Fields, a 2011 documentary
- Sri Lanka's Killing Fields: War Crimes Unpunished, a 2012 documentary
- The Killing Field, a 2014 mystery-drama-thriller television film
- Texas Killing Fields (film), a 2011 detective thriller film
- Killing Fields (TV series), a 2016–2017 cold case documentary series
- Killing Field (film), a 2018 Burmese action-thriller film
- Crime Scene: The Texas Killing Fields, a 2022 documentary miniseries about the Texas Killing Fields

== Music ==
- Killing Fields (album), by the Molemen
- "The Killing Field", a song by The Pillows on the album Living Field
- "The Killing Fields", a song by Insane Clown Posse on the album Riddle Box
- "Killing Fields", a song by Slayer on the album Divine Intervention
- "Killing Fields", a song by Funker Vogt on their album We Came to Kill and remixed on their EP Killing Time Again
- "Killing Fields", a song by Shinedown

== Other uses ==
- Killing vector field, a concept in mathematics
