= Shujaaz =

Shujaaz is a multi-media platform that aims to help improve the lives and livelihoods of young people in East Africa. It was launched in Kenya in February 2010 and is written and presented in sheng (the contemporary slang language of Kenyan youth).

A second, stand-alone edition of Shujaaz was launched in Tanzania in February 2015.

Shujaaz (which means "Heroes" in Sheng) comprises free monthly comic books distributed nationally, syndicated daily FM radio programmes, national TV shows, social media, SMS and internet content. The central character behind all the Shujaaz media is an anonymous pirate radio DJ. He engages all the different media to share good ideas that young people are using to improve their lives, reporting on his own adventures and discoveries as well as those of his fans who include both regular star characters (Maria Kim, Charlie Pele and Malkia) and the young people who contact him to share their own ideas.

After four years of media activities an independent national survey published in February 2014 found that Shujaaz had reached 69% of Kenyans aged 15–24.

Shujaaz has received two International Emmy Awards in 2012 and 2014 for its innovative multi-channel approach to story-telling and audience engagement, as well as an International Emmy Award nomination in 2013 for an associated spin-out story called JongoLove. Shujaaz and JongoLove have both received One World Media Awards in 2011 and 2013 respectively.

Shujaaz is supported by a range of commercial and development-focused organisations keen to nudge positive social change among young people in East Africa. It is produced in Nairobi & Dar es Salaam by Well Told Story, a media research and production organisation.
