= Killing of Balachandran Prabhakaran =

2009 death of a Tamil child in Sri Lanka

Balachandran Prabhakaran
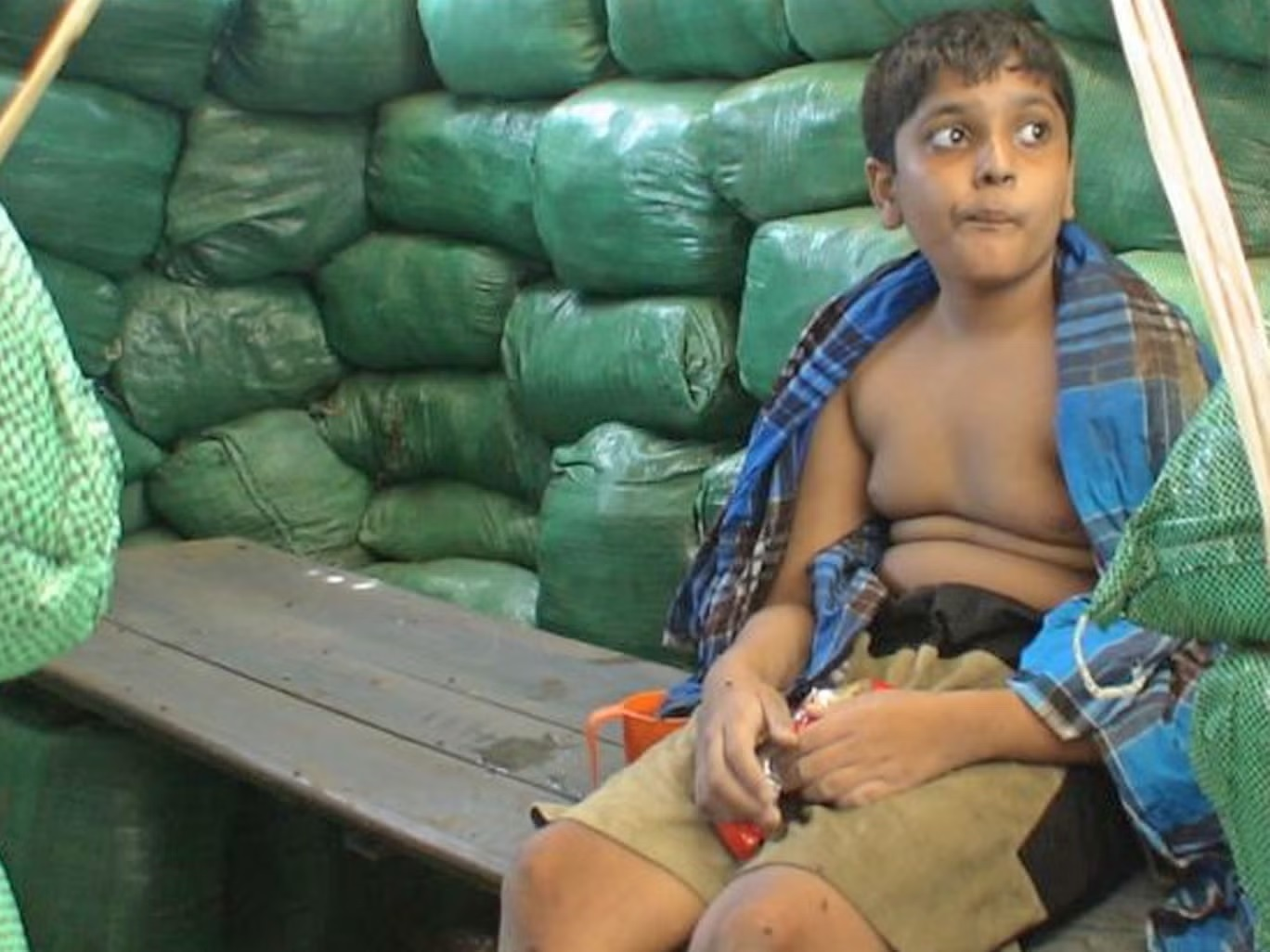
- Born: 1 October 1996
- Died: 19 May 2009 (aged 12); Nanthikadal Lagoon, Mullaitivu, Sri Lanka
- Parents: Velupillai Prabhakaran (father); Mathivathani Erambu (mother)

Balachandran Prabhakaran (1 October 1996–19 May 2009) was the third child of Velupillai Prabhakaran, the founder and leader of the Liberation Tigers of Tamil Eelam.

He was killed by Sri Lankan forces after surrendering during the final phase of the Sri Lankan civil war in May 2009. The Sri Lankan military claims he was killed in crossfire during a battle. In 2013, leaked images showed Balachandran Prabhakaran, apparently in the custody of the Sri Lankan military. Subsequent images showed him dead, having been shot up to five times in the chest.

Commenting on the publication of the images, Callum Macrae, director of the documentary No Fire Zone, stated: "The new photographs are enormously important evidentially because they appear to rule out any suggestion that Balachandran was killed in cross-fire or during a battle. They show he was held, and even given a snack, before being taken and executed in cold blood."

The group Journalists for Democracy in Sri Lanka stated that the images are proof the child was executed soon after being captured.

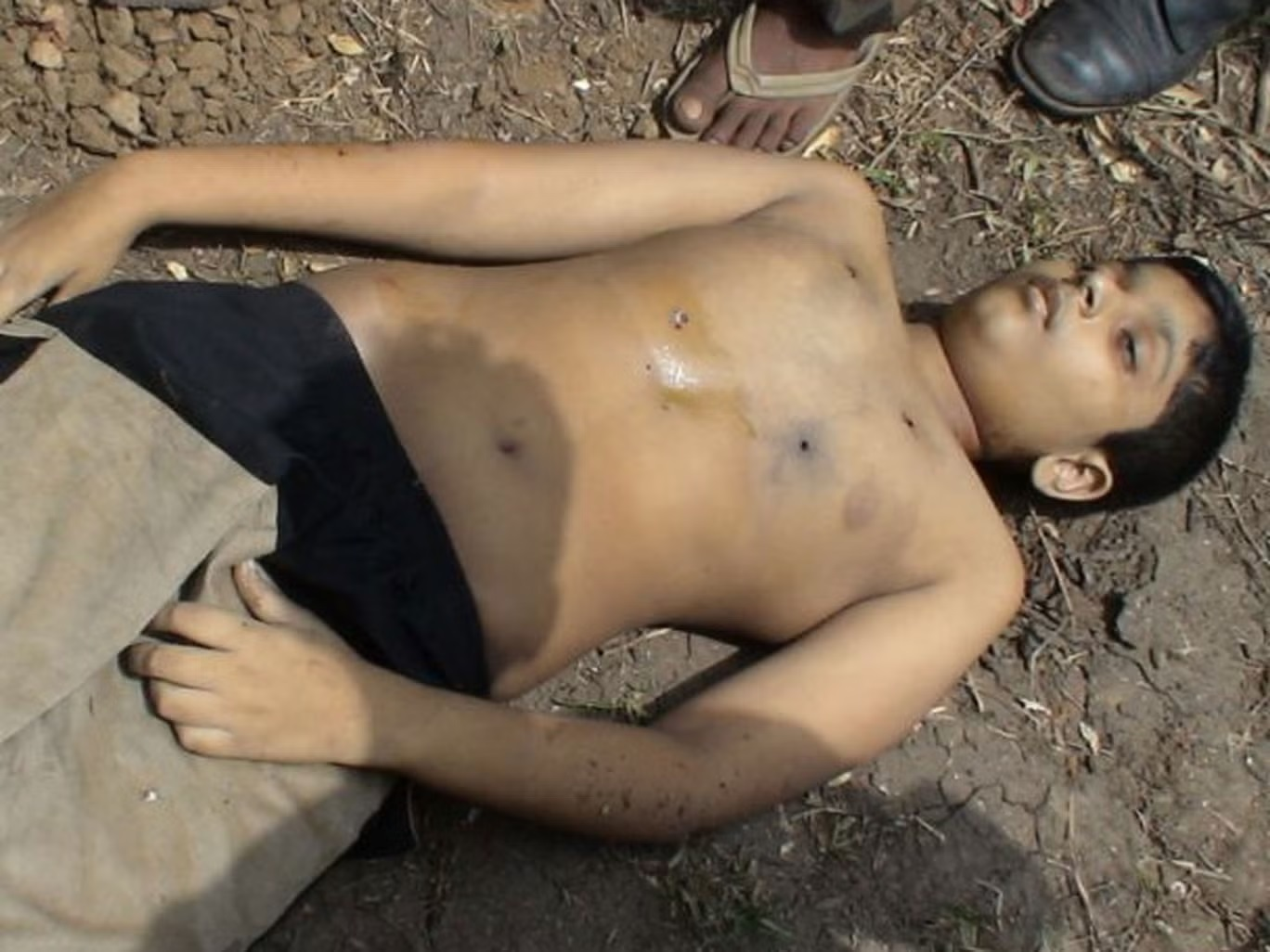
Dead body of Balachandran showing bullet wounds
