= Well Told Story =

Well Told Story is a communications research and production company active in Kenya and Tanzania and based in Nairobi, Kenya. It is best known as the producer of the multimedia youth communications platform Shujaaz.

Well Told Story has received several international media awards for innovation in multimedia storytelling including two International Emmy Awards in 2012 and 2014 and a One World Media Award in 2011 for Shujaaz, as well as an International Emmy Award Nomination and a One World Media Award in 2013 for "JongoLove", a story told in Kenya across FM radio, YouTube, SMS and Facebook.
