= Sri Lanka: The Search for Justice =

- Genre: Documentary
- Directed by: Callum Macrae
- Country of origin: United Kingdom

Production
- Running time: 30 Minutes

Related
- No Fire Zone

Sri Lanka: The Search for Justice is an investigative documentary about the final weeks of the Sri Lankan Civil War by Callum Macrae.The documentary is about the search for justice for thousands of Sri Lankan Tamils and supports international justice rather than a domestic process. It is being released under a slogan #LetThem Be Heard.
