= La Promenade =

La Promenade may refer to:

- La Promenade (Renoir), an 1870 Impressionist painting by Pierre-Auguste Renoir
- Mother and Children, an 1876 Impressionist painting by Pierre-Auguste Renoir originally exhibited as La Promenade
- La Promenade (shopping mall), an American underground shopping mall
- La Promenade Building, a Canadian office building
