= Nero (video game) =

2021 Sri Lankan video game

NERO
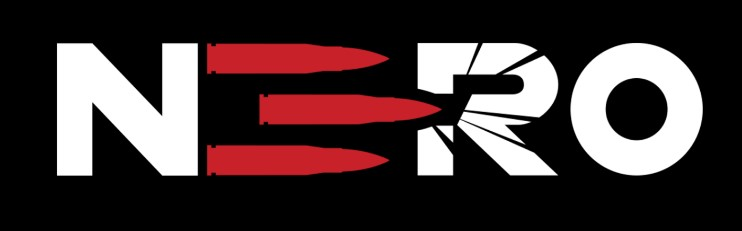
- Developer: Arimac Lanka Private Limited (2021–present)
- Publisher: Arimac Lanka Private Limited
- Director: Chamira Jayasinghe
- Producer: Chamira Jayasinghe
- Engine: Unreal Engine 4
- Platforms: Microsoft Windows; OS X
- Release: Microsoft Windows: September 26, 2021
- Genre: Stealth shooter
- Mode: Single player

Nero, stylised as NERO, or Nero: The Sniper is a Sri Lankan stealth-action third-person shooter video game released in 2021.

== Development ==
Nero is a Sri Lankan game developed by Arimac Lanka. It is the second game developed by Arimac Lanka, released five years after the development of its first, Canchayudha. The game's budget was $18,000. According to its developer, it will have a multiplayer version for mobile, and will include in-app purchases.

It was titled Nero to pay tribute to Sri Lankan Sniper hero Ranjith Premasiri Madalana, who was known as "Nero" in the Eelam war, in which he had 217 confirmed Tamil Tiger kills. Despite its name, the game does not include events from the war.

== Gameplay ==
The game has three difficulty modes on startup: Easy, Normal, and Hard; and fourthly there is Brutal which unlocks after completing the game at least on Easy.

Nero is a stealth-action third-person shooter game.

The game is mostly set in a tropical forest, with a few levels featuring industrial backgrounds. The player is given several objectives in every mission, which are briefed in a cutscene introducing the mission. When the player takes damage, the screen will show blood splatters. When the character dies, the screen turns black and restarts from a checkpoint. As the player progresses, new checkpoints are saved automatically.

== Release ==
The early access was released on 26 September 2021 by Arimac developers. The game took three years to develop, starting from 2018.

== See also ==
- Sri Lankan Civil War in popular culture
