= Kasra Naji =

Iranian journalist

- کسری ناجی
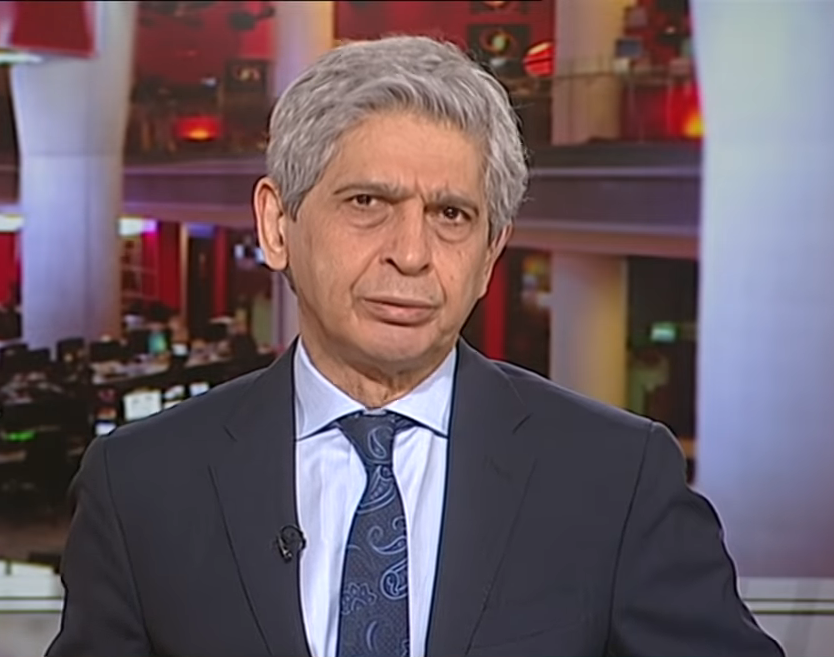
- Born: 1952-1953; Iran
- Citizenship: Iranian, British
- Occupations: Journalist; reporter
- Known for: BBC Reporter
- Notable work: Reports for CNN, The Guardian, The Economist, Los Angeles Times
- Spouse: Frances Harrison

Kasra Naji (Persian: کسرا ناجی) is an Iranian journalist and news reporter working for BBC Persian. He worked as a journalist in Tehran for a number of years during the rise of Mahmoud Ahmadinejad until he was repeatedly denied a press card. Naji is a special correspondent for the BBC and has reported for The Economist, The Guardian, and the Los Angeles Times. He is also the author of 2008 book Ahmadinejad: The Secret History of Iran’s Radical Leader, which was published by the University of California Press.
