= Precious Lunga =

Zimbabwean-born epidemiologist

Dr Precious Lunga
- Born: 4 October 1974 (age 51); Bulawayo, Rhodesia
- Education: University of Edinburgh; University of Cambridge
- Occupations: Epidemiologist, business executive, entrepreneur
- Organization: Baobab Circle
- Spouse: Jon Snow (m. 2010)
- Children: 1

Dr. Precious Lunga (born 4 October 1974) is a Zimbabwean epidemiologist, entrepreneur, and CEO/co-Founder of Baobab Circle. Between 2017 and 2018, she created Afya Pap, a mobile app offering personalized health education and coaching on chronic diseases. The app is used across seven countries in Africa, including Kenya and Uganda.

As Head of Health at Econet Wireless in 2015, Lunga launched a 24/7 dial-a-doctor service in partnership with the Ministry of Health in Zimbabwe to reach over 750,000 paying patients within a year of launch.

Lunga is a Yale World Fellow and was featured as a speaker at the Southbank Centre's Women of the World Festival in London.

== Early life ==
Precious Lunga was born in Bulawayo in what was then Rhodesia (now called Zimbabwe), and grew up there until the age of 17, when she went to Britain to study. She attended the University of Edinburgh, graduating in 1998 with a degree in neuroscience. She then earned a PhD in neuroscience in 2003 from the University of Cambridge, where she was also captain of the women's karate team.

== Career ==
After her neuroscience doctorate, Lunga began research and development in novel therapies for repairing central nervous system damage in collaboration with GlaxoSmithKline for the Brain Repair Centre at the University of Cambridge. She went on to become a founding member for EUROPRISE, a consortium of HIV vaccine and microbicide researchers working in industry and public institutions. She has worked with UNAIDS Geneva, and participated in anti-HIV microbicide trials led by the Medical Research Council (United Kingdom), where she now sits on the Board. She joined Econet in 2013 to establish their health business unit before leaving in 2016 to start Baobab Circle, developing Afya Pap, an award-winning platform that delivers localised and personalised health advice to users via mobile phones. The app was featured in a BBC Business interview, and in 2018 won the AppsAfrica award.

== Appearances ==
Lunga has appeared at the Financial Times Africa Summit, hosted a TEDx talk in 2015 and was invited as a guest for the BBC Radio 4 series Great Lives. She has panelled the Woman of the World Festival and was a speaker on the Forum radio programme for the BBC. She appeared as a speaker at the 5th annual Davenport Cook Lecture at Yale University, where she is a World Fellow, and has been interviewed by the New Statesman. In 2019, she was listed in New African's 100 most influential Africans.

== Personal life ==
In 2010, Lunga married Jon Snow, the journalist and former Channel 4 news anchor. They had a son together through surrogacy, in March 2021.
