= I Witnessed Genocide: Inside Sri Lanka's Killing Fields =

- Directed by: Priyamvatha Panchapagesan
- Country of origin: India
- Original language: English

Production
- Producer: Headlines Today

Original release
- Network: Headlines Today
- Release: 2011

I Witnessed Genocide: Inside Sri Lanka's Killing Fields is a 2011 investigative documentary film by Priyamvatha Panchapagesan of the Indian news channel Headlines Today. Priyamvatha went undercover to the Vanni to report on the survivors of the Sri Lankan Civil War.

The documentary telecasts on-ground interviews with survivors who narrate accounts of sexual abuse in internment camps, the use of chemical and cluster bombs by the Sri Lanka Armed Forces, killing of thousands of civilians in aerial bombardment and artillery attacks and continued denial of their basic rights.

Priyamvatha received the prestigious "Best investigative news report" award for the documentary, in the 2012 News Television Award in New Delhi. Findings from the documentary were quoted during debates in both houses of India's Parliament and in the Tamil Nadu Assembly.

== See also ==
- List of films about the Tamil genocide
