= Sinamkol =

2020 Sri Lankan-Indian Tamil-language drama film

- Directed by: Ranjith Joseph
- Written by: Theepachelvan; Ranjith Joseph
- Based on: Aftermath of Sri Lankan Civil War
- Produced by: Raja Jayakulasingham; Karikalan; Gayathiri Ranjith; Bakialakhmi Venkatesh
- Starring: Aravindhan; Narvini Dery Ravishangar; Leelawathy; Sinthar Athith; Mathumathi
- Cinematography: M R Palanikumaar
- Edited by: Arunachalam Sivalingam
- Music by: N. R. Raghunanthan
- Production companies: Skymagic Pictures; Bakialakhmi Talkies
- Release date: 4 January 2020
- Running time: 121 minutes
- Country: Sri Lanka
- Language: Tamil

Sinamkol is a 2020 Sri Lankan Tamil-language war drama film directed by Ranjith Joseph and starring Aravindhan.

== Plot ==
Sinamkol is the story of a Liberation Tigers of Tamil Eelam militant Amudhan during the Sri Lankan civil war, his incredible journey and tribulations, as he searches for his wife and daughter after being released from detention by the genocidal Sri Lankan regime. Parallelly, a Tamil diaspora family visiting Sri Lanka encounters troubles of post-war challenges. Sinamkol carries a powerful political message of post-war challenges faced by the minority Tamils.

== Cast ==
- Aravindhan
- Narvini Dery Ravishangar
- Leelawathy
- Sinthar Athith
- Mathumathi
- Theepachelvan
- Phathmen

== Production ==
The film is about the change that Jaffna has undergone in the past ten years. The film was shot in northern and eastern Sri Lanka. Other than three cast members, most of the cast are newcomers. The film was in the making for the past ten years. The film was shot in Jaffna and Mullaitivu. The film was shot in places affected by the Sri Lankan Civil War. Much of the crew members are Sinhalese and the film was funded by Sri Lankan Tamilians living abroad in Europe and Canada as well as in Tamil Nadu. The film is about a militant who is released from a Sinhalese controlled prison and returns to his motherland.

== Awards and nominations ==
Year	Award	Category	Nominee	Result	Ref.
2020	Norway Tamil Film Festival	Best Feature Film Tamil – Diaspora	Sinamkol	Won	
2020	Norway Tamil Film Festival	Best Director Tamil – Diaspora	Ranjith Joseph	Won	
2020	Norway Tamil Film Festival	Best Actor Male Tamil – Diaspora	Aravindhan	Won	

== See also ==
- List of films about the Tamil genocide
