= Sharmila Seyyid =

Sri Lankan novelist, poet, and activist

- ஸர்மிளா செய்யித்
- Born: Eravur
- Occupation: Writer, journalist, poet

Sharmila Seyyid (born 1982) is a Sri Lankan Tamil-language novelist, poet, journalist, and activist. She has published two novels, two collections of poetry, and a work of non-fiction.

Seyyid was born in Eravur, Sri Lanka and grew up during the Sri Lankan Civil War (1983–2009). "My childhood memories are full of war, crimes and displacement," she said.

Seyyid worked as a journalist and community activist, founding a community-based organization called the Organization for Social Development in 2009, and ran a school in Eravur with her sister.

She published her first poetry collection, Siragu Mullatha Penn, in 2012. At an book launch event, Sri Lanka Justice Minister Rauff Hakeem read one of Seyyid's poems about sex workers. She was asked about the topic during a November 2012 interview with BBC Tamil, and she stated that legalization would help protect sex workers. Her comment sparked a barrage of harassment directed at her and her family, including an arson attempt and threats of rape and acid attacks. She fled to Chennai, India with her son in December 2012. While in India she earned a bachelor's degree in social work from Stella Marris College

In 2014, she published her first novel, Ummath: A Novel of Community and Conflict. The novel follows the lives of three women, Yogalakshmi, Theivanai, and Thawakkul, during the Sri Lankan Civil War. An English translation by Gita Subramanian was published in 2018. Passages in the novel opposing purdah enraged Islamic fundamentalists, who demanded Seyyid remove photos of herself from Facebook, which she refused. Fundamentalists circulated graphic altered images that made it appear that she was raped and murdered and falsely linked her to an audio recording of an explicit conversation between a police officer and his female subordinate.

In 2015, Seyyid returned to Sri Lanka. She founded Mantra Life, an organization devoted to women's financial independence.

Following the 2019 Sri Lanka Easter bombings, she was informed that she was on a list of targets of the Islamist terrorist group National Thowheeth Jama'ath. She left Sri Lanka again in August 2019. Following a two-month residency at Art Omi in New York, she went to India and Thailand. Through the Artist Protection Fund, she began working at the University of Nebraska Omaha in 2023.

== Bibliography ==
- Siragu Mullatha Penn ("The Women Who Grew Wings", 2012)
- உம்மத் (Ummath: A Novel of Community and Conflict) (2014)
- Ovva (“Incompatible”, 2015)
- Panikkar Pethi (“The Elephant Tamer’s Granddaughter”, 2019)
- உயிர்த்த ஞாயிறு (Uyirtha Gnayiru, 2021)
