= Still Counting the Dead =

Book by Frances Harrison

- First edition
- Author: Frances Harrison
- Language: English
- Genre: Non-fiction
- Publisher: Portobello Books
- Publication date: 2012
- Pages: 272
- ISBN: 9781846274695

Still Counting the Dead: Survivors of Sri Lanka's Hidden War is a book written by the British journalist Frances Harrison, a former BBC correspondent in Sri Lanka and former Amnesty Head of news. The book deals with thousands of Sri Lankan Tamil civilians who were killed, caught in the crossfire during the war. This and the government's strict media blackout would leave the world unaware of their suffering in the final stages of the Sri Lankan Civil War. The books also highlights the failure of the United Nations, whose staff left before the final offensive started.
