= Sri Lanka's Rebel Wife =

- Genre: Documentary
- Directed by: Kannan Arunasalam

Sri Lanka’s Rebel Wife: A woman’s search for her missing husband is a documentary by Kannan Arunasalam about missing Tamil rebels who surrendered to the Sri Lankan Army in the final stages of the Sri Lankan Civil War. It deals with the case of Ananthi Sasitharan 's husband EIilan who surrendered to the Sri Lankan army and was never seen again. The film was shortlisted for the DIG Investigative Documentary (medium format) awards in Modena, Italy (September, 2022) and recognised at the 42nd International URTI Grand Prix with the Martine Filippi prize for Discovery (September, 2023).
