= Tamil Tigress =

Book by Niromi de Soyza

- Author: Niromi de Soyza
- Language: English
- Publisher: Allen & Unwin
- Publication date: July 2011
- Publication place: Australia
- Pages: 320
- ISBN: 978-1-74237-518-2

Tamil Tigress is a book by Niromi de Soyza (a pen name based on that of Richard de Zoysa), which tells the autobiographical story of a former child soldier of the Sri Lankan guerrilla army Liberation Tigers of Tamil Eelam (LTTE) and one of its first female fighters. This is the first narration of a Sri Lankan female guerrilla soldier to be published as a memoir in English. It was initially written as a diary while at boarding school after the author fled Sri Lanka. The author was inspired to rewrite the book for publication after seeing the negative reaction to those fleeing from the civil war in Sri Lanka.

The book was first published by Allen & Unwin in May 2011. It is included in the 50 Books You Can't Put Down' list as part of the Get Reading programme sponsored by the Australian Ministry for the Arts and the Australia Council. It was subsequently published in the United States and India in May 2012, and in the UK in August 2012.

== Pen name ==
The name Niromi de Soyza is based on that of Richard de Zoysa, a well-known Sri Lankan journalist and human rights activist who was abducted and murdered in 1990, by suspected government agents.

== Author ==
At the time of publishing the work in 2011, the author of the book is the mother of two children, and living in Sydney, Australia. She was raised in Sri Lanka by a middle-class Tamil Christian family, and at the age of 17 ran away from her convent school to join the Tigers. After leaving the Tigers she was sent by her family to a boarding school in India, and then gained political asylum in Australia at a time when the Tigers were not regarded as a terrorist organisation by the Australian government.

== Responses ==
=== Australian Media response ===
The book received wide publicity in Australia, drawing in general sympathetic comment from Australian media personnel. Gordon Weiss, the Australian-born former UN spokesman in Sri Lanka and author of The Cage: The Fight for Sri Lanka and the Last Days of the Tamil Tigers, responded warmly to the book, saying

I found it incredibly moving, you get the perspective of a young person, coming of age and experiencing oppression in extraordinary circumstances, who then joins in great innocence this organisation which seems to offer so much hope. She ultimately sees (the LTTE) as no solution and leaves, because she doesn't want to become like them. It's really a story of redemption. A young woman drags herself back from the precipice and literally, one day, casts off her uniform and walks out of the forest.

=== Reviews ===
Gerard Windsor reviewing Tamil Tigress came to the conclusion that the form of the book is more that of a realist novel than a memoir, leading him to tell us that there must be a creative element here, although he was probably unaware that the book was first written in diary form immediately after de Soyza fled Sri Lanka. He commented that action, often pedestrian and repetitious, rather than thoughtfulness, is what moves the book forward with a mature, briskly businesslike de Soyza only entering the book in its final pages.

Prof. V.Suryanarayan in the Eurasia Review calls it an absorbing account "which describes the best and the worst of the Tigers."

Publishers Weekly, in relation to the US release, describes the book as an engaging memoir where readers "will both empathize with and judge de Soyza's experiences in the Tamil struggle."

The Book Review Literary Trust in India describes the memoir as deeply moving, very humane, and a "jaw-dropping true story." The reviewer, M.R. Narayan Swamy, comments, "Indeed, I have not read another more honest and candid account of the now vanquished Liberation Tigers of Tamil Eelam (LTTE), that too from the inside," stating that the book is more than just an autobiographical journey, but is a rare microscope that takes its readers into the heart of the LTTE.

=== Historical detail ===
The book's authenticity has been challenged by some on the grounds that it makes an error in historical detail. They allege a misrepresentation by the author of the identity of her combat adversaries which contradicts the historical context of her claimed fighting tenure (late 1987 to 1988 according to Tamil Tigress ).

From late July 1987 to early 1990, the signing of the Indo-Sri Lanka Accord and the consequent arrival of the IPKF ensured the withdrawal of the Sri Lankan troops from the Battlefield. Under the terms of the agreement,Colombo agreed to a devolution of power to the provinces, the Sri Lankan troops were to be withdrawn to their barracks in the north and the Tamil rebels were to surrender their arms. When the LTTE was at war with the IPKF from early October, 1987 to end of 1989, not one of the three arms of the Sri Lankan forces participated in joint action with the IPKF or had any integrated command structure. The Sri Lankan forces stayed clear of direct combat with the LTTE during this period, apart from the limited operations undertaken at sea by the Sri Lankan Navy. In contrast the blurb of Tamil Tigress announces,

"Two days before Christmas in 1987, at the age of 17, Niromi de Soyza found herself in an ambush as part of a small platoon of militant Tamil Tigers fighting government forces in the bloody civil war that was to engulf Sri Lanka for decades…"

This is not a publisher's mistake confined to a publisher's blurb as the author herself makes specific reference to who the Tigers fought during this time. When she joined 'the Indian forces had arrived and the Tigers had chosen to fight the Indian forces as well as the Sri Lankan forces.' When the war resumed, 'just as Prabhakaran had predicted', they 'were fighting not only the government troops but the peacekeepers, too'. She 'put down her gun and fled the violence she'd become a part of, unable to deal any longer with the brutality of her fellow Tigers or the viciousness of the Sri Lankan armed forces'. Most of her time with the Tigers was 'spent running and hiding from government soldiers'.

In her Throsby interview, responding to a question about a film - the "four corners documentary", which is a documentary covering the atrocities committed by the Sri Lankan Government Forces during the final stages of the Elam War, Niromi de Soyza makes another statement, which can be linked to this misrepresentation of the historical context of the period.

"I watched it. I forced myself to watch it… It distressed the whole time….I couldn't sleep that night… but at the same time it wasn't new. This was something that I knew had happened. I mean I had witnessed much of it and I knew when… the Tamil tigers were caught by the soldiers those things would happen …they would be shot in the head, raped, tortured all of those things. It was nothing new."-(between 35.56 and 36.23)

Michael Roberts, a Sri Lankan-Australian historical anthropologist who has a history of asking his readers to disbelieve Tamil accounts of the war in Sri Lanka, has interpreted this contextual misrepresentation by the author as an attempt to give the book greater contemporary currency by projecting the Sri Lankan Forces (contemporary target for war crimes allegations) into the fighting experiences attributed to Niromi de Soyza in Tamil Tigress.

A review of the memoir in Ceylon Today states that while some of the arguments put forward to question its authenticity may have some veracity, they are excusable, whereas the other arguments put forward are "a load of nonsense." The reviewer states that most of the debunking allegations are rather arbitrary and petty, and that Jaffna Tamils who have actually read the book point out that its portrayal of Jaffna life at that time is quite authentic.

=== Sri Lankan Government response ===
The quibbles regarding the book's authenticity would seem to be rendered irrelevant by the Sri Lankan government, who do not seem to have any reservation confirming that de Soyza was indeed a member of the LTTE, and that the claims she makes are true.

=== Author's response ===
As part of an "inspirational address" to an Australian women's business network, it was reported that while "Sri Lankan critics have questioned Niromi's incredible story, she stands by her memoirs."

When asked about the allegations of authenticity in a Q&A, the author responded, "Many have dispelled these myths. I trust in the intelligence of the readers - to read the book with an open mind without agendas and to listen to my many interviews and make up their own mind."
