= Gota's War =

Non-fiction book about the Sri Lankan Civil War

Gota’s War
- First edition
- Author: C A Chandraprema
- Language: English
- Subject: Memoir
- Genre: Non-fiction
- Publication date: 2012
- Publication place: Sri Lanka

Gota’s War: The Crushing of Tamil Tiger Terrorism in Sri Lanka is book written by a Sri Lankan Journalist C A Chandraprema of Divaina newspaper about the role of Gotabhaya Rajapaksa in ending the Sri Lankan Civil War
