= Fallujah, The Hidden Massacre =

2005 documentary film

- Created by: Sigfrido Ranucci and Maurizio Torrealta
- Country of origin: Italy
- Original languages: Italian; English

Original release
- Network: RAI
- Release: 8 November 2005

Fallujah, The Hidden Massacre is a documentary film by Sigfrido Ranucci and Maurizio Torrealta which first aired on Italy's RAI state television network on November 8, 2005. The film documents the use of chemical weapons, particularly the use of incendiary bombs containing white phosphorus, and alleges that insurgents and civilians, including children, had been killed or injured by chemical burns by military forces of the United States of America in the city of Fallujah in Iraq during the Fallujah Offensive of November 2004.

The film's primary themes are:

- Establishing a case for war crimes against civilians committed by the United States.
- Documenting evidence for the use of chemical devices by the US military.
- Documenting other human rights abuses by American forces and their Iraqi counterparts.

== White phosphorus ==
White phosphorus (WP) is a chemical smoke-producing agent, reacting quickly and spontaneously with air and causing an instant bank of smoke. As a result, WP munitions are common, particularly as smoke grenades for infantry, loaded in defensive grenade dischargers on tanks and other armored vehicles, or as part of the ammunition allotment for artillery or mortars. These create smokescreens to mask movement from the enemy, or to mask his fire. WP burns fiercely and can set cloth, fuel, ammunition and other combustibles on fire, so it is also used as an incendiary weapon. WP use is legal for purposes such as illumination and obscuring smoke, and the Chemical Weapons Convention does not list WP in its schedules of chemical weapons.

National Institute for Occupational Safety and Health (NIOSH) gives the following information about white phosphorus. It "spontaneously catches fire in air". Handling requires the most severe level of safety equipment because it is classified as a level 4 hazard, the highest level. When WP comes in contact with skin, it reacts to become phosphoric acid, and continues burning until neutralized. WP causes severe second and third degree burns upon contact with skin or eyes. WP smoke also causes eye and respiratory tract irritation. It not only reacts with skin, but dissolves fat and tissues beneath the skin. When it was used for producing matches, inhalation of the vapors caused a condition known as phossy jaw, where the bones of workers dissolved in their faces.

== War crimes ==
The primary theme of the film is its assertion of a case for war crimes committed by the United States in its military offensive against Fallujah in Iraq. The film documents the use of weapons based on white phosphorus and other substances similar to napalm, such as Mark 77 bomb, by American forces.

Interviews with American ex-military personnel who were involved in the Fallujah offensive testify to the use of the weapons by the United States, while reporters who were stationed in Iraq discuss the American government's attempts to suppress the news by covert means.

=== Incendiary weapons used against personnel and civilians ===
The film states that the use of napalm and similar agents was banned by the United Nations in 1980 for use against civilians and also for use against military targets in proximity to civilians.

The use of white phosphorus, as a marker, smokescreen layer or as a weapon, is not banned by Protocol III of the 1980 Convention on Certain Conventional Weapons. What is prohibited is the use of incendiary weapons against targets in close proximity to civilians or civilian property. The protocol specifically excludes weapons whose incendiary effect is secondary, such as smoke and tracer rounds. The United States is among the nations that are parties to the convention but did not sign Protocol III until 2009. In the 1990s, the U.S. government condemned Iraqi President Saddam Hussein for allegedly using "white phosphorus chemical weapons" against Kurdish rebels and residents of Irbil and Dohuk.

The March–April 2005 online Field Artillery magazine has confirmed the use of WP (white phosphorus) in so-called "shake 'n bake" attacks: "WP proved to be an effective and versatile munition. We used it for screening missions at two breeches and, later in the fight, as a potent psychological weapon against the insurgents in trench lines and spider holes when we could not get effects on them with [high explosives (HE)]. We fired "shake and bake" missions at the insurgents, using WP to flush them out and HE to take them out." [P.26]

Graphic visual footage of the WP weapons being fired from helicopters into urban areas is displayed, as well as detailed footage of the remains of those killed by these weapons, including children and women. The filmmakers interview US ex-military support Marine and antiwar activist Jeff Englehart of Colorado who discusses the American use of white phosphorus, nicknamed "Whiskey Pete" (pre-NATO US phonetic alphabet for "WP" – white phosphorus) by U.S. servicemembers, in built-up areas, and describes the Fallujah offensive as "just a massive killing of Arabs".

Following pressure from former Labour MP Alice Mahon, the British Ministry of Defence confirmed the use of Mark 77 firebombs by US forces during the initial invasion of Iraq.

The Independent said that there were independent reports of civilians from Fallujah suffering burn injuries. One resident said that US forces used "weird bombs that put up smoke like a mushroom cloud" and that he watched "pieces of these bombs explode into large fires that continued to burn on the skin even after people dumped water on the burns". Dahr Jamail, an unembedded reporter who collected the testimony of refugees from Fallujah, spoke to a doctor who had "treated people who had their skin melted".

=== Indiscriminate violence ===
The film alleges that Iraqi civilians, including women and children, had died of burns caused by white phosphorus during the Fallujah offensive as part of its campaign. Englehart described WP as being dispersed in a cloud that "kills indiscriminately" within a large area, "every human being or animal". Former US Army scout Garret Reppenhagen, also from Colorado, claimed that civilian deaths were common. He described an instance of killing civilians with "machine gun fire" as they were escaping in a car that was approaching him.

The US military responded by stating that they gave civilians several days of advance warning of the assault and urged them to evacuate the city. This was done through loudspeakers and leaflets dropped by helicopter. However, men of "fighting age" were stopped from leaving the city, numerous women and children also stayed behind, and a correspondent for the Guardian estimated that between 30,000 and 50,000 civilians were still in the city when the assault took place. "The marines treated Falluja as if its only inhabitants were fighters. They levelled thousands of buildings, illegally denied access to the Iraqi Red Crescent and, according to the UN's special rapporteur, used 'hunger and deprivation of water as a weapon of war against the civilian population'."

On November 16, 2005 the Pentagon spokesman Lt. Col. Barry Venable said that "suggestions that U.S. forces targeted civilians with these weapons are simply wrong," but he had to admit to the Financial Times that "it would not be out of the realm of the possible" that civilians were also killed by the white phosphorus.

== Criticism ==
Critics of the film point out that white phosphorus is not considered a "chemical weapon" under the Chemical Weapons Convention but an incendiary weapon. Even though it has been used as rat poison, it primarily burns its subject. The Federation of American Scientists (FAS) states that white phosphorus is still used by military powers around the world, even though it states:

Direct skin contact can lead to thermal burns and chemical burns. WP particles react with oxygen and can cause 2nd and 3rd degree thermal burns. The particles can also enter the body through the burns or other wounds and continue to damage tissues. Chemical burns result from several different compounds produced through WP reactions. These include phosphorus pentoxide which can react with the water in skin and produce corrosive phosphoric acids.

Crucially, [the US] statement that white phosphorus had been used as an incendiary was not an admission that a chemical or otherwise illegal weapon had been deployed. Still less was it evidence that a massacre of civilians had taken place in Falluja.

— Paul Wood (The BBC's defence correspondent) 17 November 2005

The media couldn't have made a bigger pig's ear of the white phosphorus story. So, before moving on to the new revelations from Falluja, I would like to try to clear up the old ones. There is no hard evidence that white phosphorus was used against civilians. The claim was made in a documentary broadcast on the Italian network RAI, called Falluja: the Hidden Massacre. It claimed that the corpses in the pictures it ran "showed strange injuries, some burnt to the bone, others with skin hanging from their flesh ... The faces have literally melted away, just like other parts of the body. The clothes are strangely intact." These assertions were supported by a human-rights advocate who, it said, possessed "a biology degree".

I, too, possess a biology degree, and I am as well qualified to determine someone's cause of death as I am to perform open-heart surgery. So I asked Chris Milroy, professor of forensic pathology at the University of Sheffield, to watch the film. He reported that "nothing indicates to me that the bodies have been burnt". They had turned black and lost their skin "through decomposition". We don't yet know how these people died. But there is hard evidence that white phosphorus was deployed as a weapon against combatants in Fallujah. As this column revealed last Tuesday, US infantry officers confessed that they had used it to flush out insurgents.

...But buried in this hogwash is a grave revelation. An assault weapon the marines were using had been armed with warheads containing "about 35% thermobaric novel explosive (NE) and 65% standard high explosive". They deployed it "to cause the roof to collapse and crush the insurgents fortified inside interior rooms". It was used repeatedly: "The expenditure of explosives clearing houses was enormous."

The marines can scarcely deny that they know what these weapons do. An article published in the Gazette in 2000 details the effects of their use by the Russians in Grozny. Thermobaric, or "fuel-air" weapons, it says, form a cloud of volatile gases or finely powdered explosives. "This cloud is then ignited and the subsequent fireball sears the surrounding area while consuming the oxygen in this area. The lack of oxygen creates an enormous overpressure ... Personnel under the cloud are literally crushed to death. Outside the cloud area, the blast wave travels at some 3,000 metres per second ... As a result, a fuel-air explosive can have the effect of a tactical nuclear weapon without residual radiation ... Those personnel caught directly under the aerosol cloud will die from the flame or overpressure. For those on the periphery of the strike, the injuries can be severe. Burns, broken bones, contusions from flying debris and blindness may result. Further, the crushing injuries from the overpressure can create air embolism within blood vessels, concussions, multiple internal haemorrhages in the liver and spleen, collapsed lungs, rupture of the eardrums and displacement of the eyes from their sockets." It is hard to see how you could use these weapons in Falluja without killing civilians.

"This looks to me like a convincing explanation of the damage done to Falluja, a city in which between 30,000 and 50,000 civilians might have been taking refuge. It could also explain the civilian casualties shown in the film. So the question has now widened: is there any crime the coalition forces have not committed in Iraq?"

— George Monbiot in The Guardian November 22, 2005

In 2012 a study, released by the Switzerland-based International Journal of Environmental Research and Public Health, showed that in the years following Operation Phantom Fury there had been a 4-fold increase in all cancers, including a 12-fold increases in childhood cancer in those aged 0–14. Nadim al-Hadid, spokesperson of Falluja Hospital declared: "In 2004 the Americans tested all kinds of chemicals and explosive devices on us: thermobaric weapons, white phosphorus, depleted uranium... we have all been laboratory mice for them".

== See also ==
- Sri Lanka's Killing Fields, a 2011 documentary film
- Eyes and Ears of God, a 2012 documentary film
