= Jon Snow (journalist) =

English journalist and TV presenter (born 1947)

Jon Snow HonFRIBA
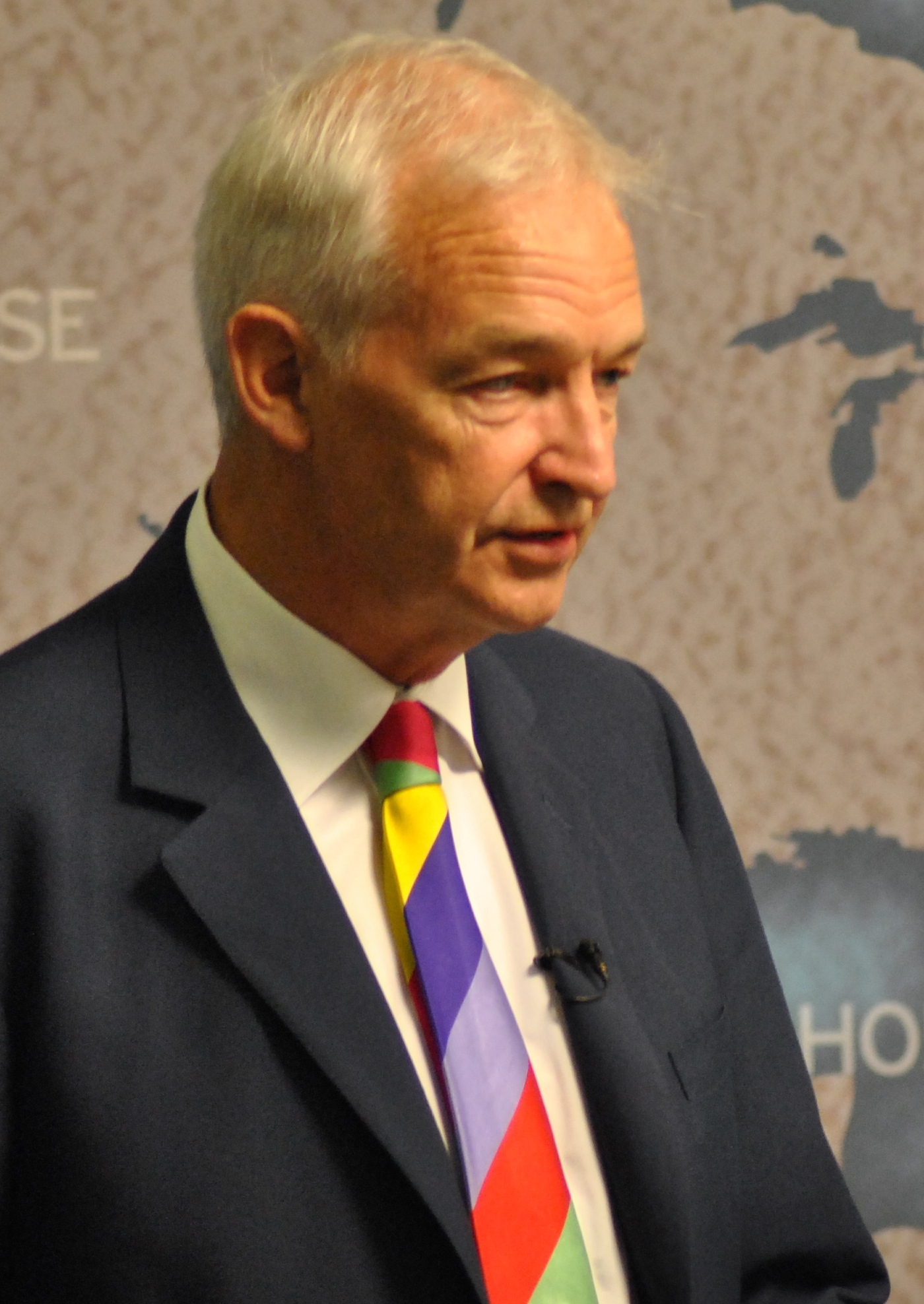
- Snow in 2011
- Born: Jonathan George Snow; 28 September 1947 (age 79); Ardingly, Sussex, England
- Education: The Pilgrims' School; St Edward's School; Scarborough TEC; University of Liverpool (did not graduate)
- Occupations: Journalist, television presenter, news anchor
- Years active: 1973–present
- Notable credit: Channel 4 News (1989–2021)
- Spouse: Precious Lunga (m. 2010)
- Partner: Madeleine Colvin (separated)
- Children: 3
- Father: George D'Oyly Snow
- Relatives: Sir Thomas D'Oyly Snow (grandfather); Peter Snow (cousin); Dan Snow (cousin once removed)

Jonathan George Snow (born 28 September 1947) is an English journalist and television presenter. He is best known as the longest-running presenter of Channel 4 News, which he presented from 1989 to 2021. On 29 April 2021, Snow announced his retirement from the role; his final programme aired on 23 December 2021. Although Channel 4's news programming is produced by ITN, Snow was employed directly by the broadcaster.

Snow has held numerous honorary appointments, including Chancellor of Oxford Brookes University from 2001 to 2008.

== Early life and education ==
Snow was born in Ardingly, Sussex, the son of George D'Oyly Snow, Bishop of Whitby, and Joan, a pianist who studied at the Royal College of Music. He is a grandson of First World War General Sir Thomas D'Oyly Snow (about whom he writes in his foreword to Ronald Skirth's war memoir The Reluctant Tommy) and is the cousin of retired BBC television news presenter Peter Snow. He grew up at Ardingly College, where his father was headmaster. In 2013, he recounted how the inquiry into Sir Jimmy Savile had allowed him to re-evaluate his own childhood, having been molested by one of the college's domestic staff when he was aged six.

Snow was awarded a choral scholarship by Winchester Cathedral. He spent five years at the Pilgrims' School, which educates the choristers of Winchester Cathedral Choir. He subsequently attended St Edward's School in Oxford. When he was 18, he spent a year as a VSO volunteer teaching in Uganda.

After mixed success in his first attempt to pass his A-level qualifications, he moved to the Yorkshire Coast College, Scarborough, where he later obtained the necessary qualifications to gain a place reading Law at the University of Liverpool. However, he did not complete his undergraduate studies, being expelled for his part in a 1970 anti-apartheid socialist student protest, which he later described as "an absolute watershed in my life".

== Career ==
After his law degree studies were terminated at Liverpool University, Snow was hired by Lord Longford to direct the New Horizon Youth Centre, a day centre for homeless young people in central London, an organisation with which he has remained involved and of which he subsequently became chairman.

In 1973, he became a presenter on LBC Radio, a then new commercial radio station.

By 1977, he was working as a correspondent for ITN, reporting from Somalia on the conflict with Ethiopia. In November 1978 he was sent on a mission to Vietnam to report on the plight of the boat people. He served as ITN's Washington correspondent (1983–1986) and as diplomatic editor (1986–1989) before becoming the main presenter of Channel 4 News in 1989. In 1992, he was the main anchor for ITN's election night programme, broadcast on ITV; he presented the programme alongside Robin Day, Alastair Stewart and Julia Somerville. (Previously ITN's programme had typically been presented by Alastair Burnet, who left ITN in 1991. The 1992 election night programme was the only one hosted by Snow. He was replaced by Jonathan Dimbleby from 1997 onwards.)

Snow is known for sporting his vast collection of colourful ties and socks.

While working as a journalist in Uganda, he flew alongside President Idi Amin in the presidential jet, and Snow has recounted how while Amin appeared to be asleep he thought seriously about taking Amin's revolver and shooting him dead, but was worried about the consequences of firing a loose round in a jet.

In 1976, Snow reportedly rejected an approach by British intelligence services to spy on his colleagues. At first he was asked to supply information about the Communist Party, but he was then asked to spy on certain "left-wing people" working in television. In return, he would have received secret monthly, tax-free payments, matching his then salary.

In 1980, in the early stages of the Iran–Iraq War, he helped rescue a British ship that had become trapped in Iranian waters.

In 2002 he returned to radio, presenting Jon Snow Reports on Oneword Radio, a weekly show and podcast. He wrote regular articles for the Channel 4 News website and Snowmail – a daily email newsletter on the big stories coming up on the evening edition of Channel 4 News.

In 2003, at the height of the dodgy dossier affair, Alastair Campbell walked into the studio to rebut statements by the BBC. Without notes or preparation, Snow attempted to question Campbell about the affair.

In 2004, Snow published an autobiography, Shooting History. The book was published by Harper Perennial and detailed Snow's life from his childhood up to the 2003 invasion of Iraq.

Snow refuses to wear any symbol that may represent his views on air; in the run-up to Remembrance Day, he condemned what he called "poppy fascism" because "in the end there really must be more important things in life than whether a news presenter wears symbols on his lapels".

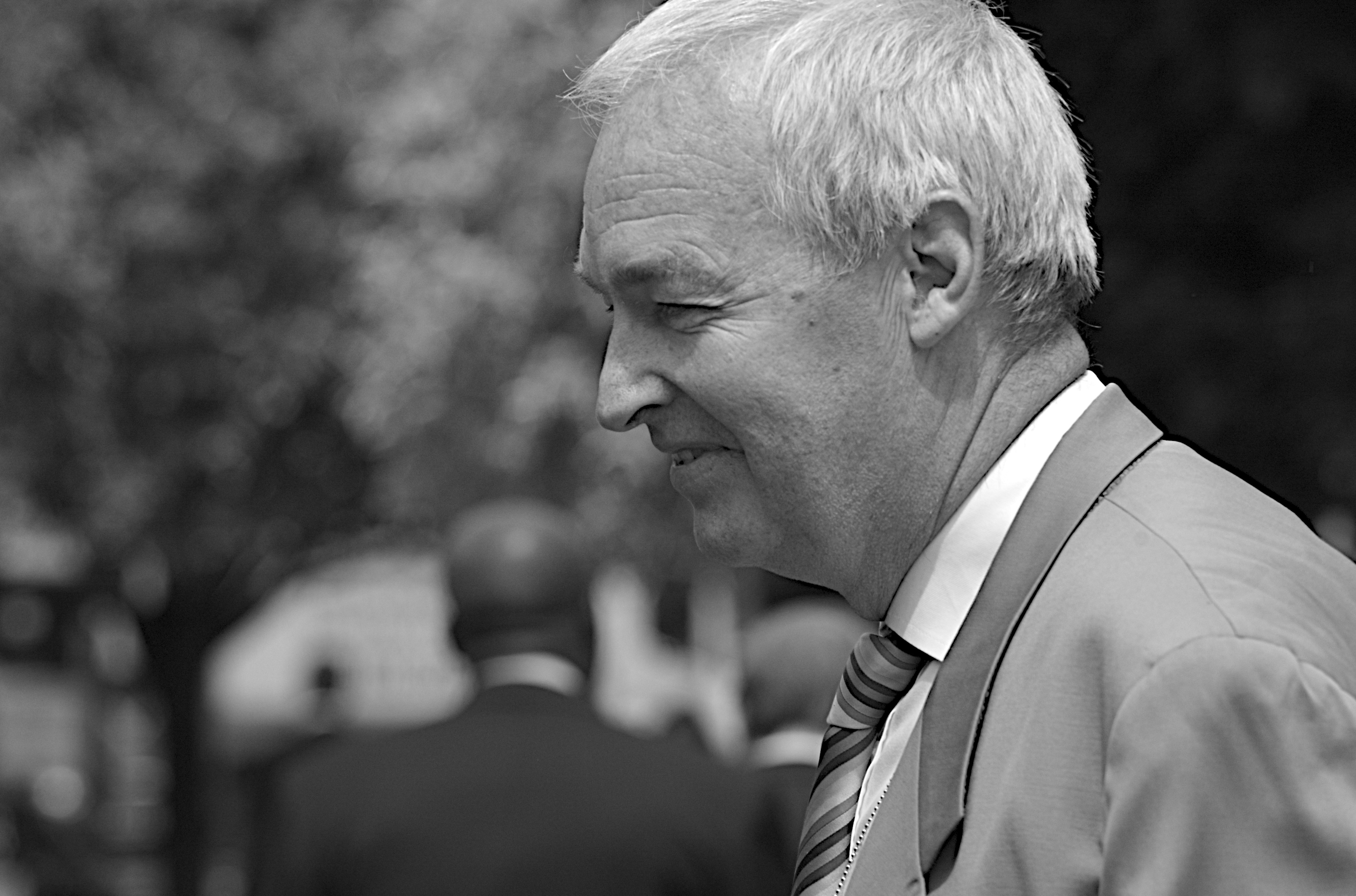
Snow in June 2007

On 28 February 2008, Snow said that the silence of the British media on the decision to allow Prince Harry to fight in Afghanistan was unacceptable: "I never thought I'd find myself saying thank God for Drudge. The infamous US blogger has broken the best kept editorial secret of recent times. Editors have been sworn to secrecy over Prince Harry being sent to fight in Afghanistan three months ago." These remarks provoked criticism from some viewers and media outlets.

On 9 February 2009, Snow interviewed Lt-Col Yvonne Bradley, the military counsel for Binyam Mohamed, a British resident detained for five years at Guantánamo Bay. Snow asked whether Mohamed's allegations of torture were justified; Bradley said there was no doubt at all that he had been tortured. Mohamed was released and returned to Britain on 23 February 2009.

In November 2010, Snow was sent to Haiti to report on the cholera outbreak.

On 14 June 2011, Snow presented the multiple award-winning investigation documentary Sri Lanka's Killing Fields, directed by Callum Macrae, which documented war crimes committed in the final days of the Sri Lankan conflict in 2009. The second part, Sri Lanka's Killing Fields: War Crimes Unpunished was broadcast in March 2012.

In early 2014, Snow had a debate with comedian and actor Russell Brand who appeared in a Channel 4 interview about his petition for a debate on British drug laws.

=== Accusations of bias ===
In June 2017, it was reported that Snow had shouted "fuck the Tories" at Glastonbury. Conservative minister Grant Shapps later refused to appear on Channel 4 News, doubting its neutrality, stating: "I don't think he can deal in an even handed manner in any interview with a Conservative MP. He has lost all credibility." MP Andrew Bridgen called for Snow's resignation, arguing that Snow's "extreme views" were incompatible with an impartial interviewer. BBC presenter Andrew Marr commented that if he had made similar comments, he would have lost his job. Channel 4 released a statement saying that Snow had been “spoken to and reminded of his responsibilities around due impartiality”.

In March 2019, while reporting at a pro-Brexit protest, Snow said that he had "never seen so many white people in one place". Media regulator Ofcom received 2,644 complaints about Snow's comment; viewers "considered the comment unnecessary". A Channel 4 spokeswoman released a statement stating that it was "an unscripted observation" and that the broadcaster regretted any offence caused. Ofcom investigated whether the comment "broke our rules on offensive content", and ruled in August to clear him over the remarks.

== Other ventures ==
Following his retirement from ITN as the news anchor for Channel 4 in 2021, Snow continued his long association with the broadcaster by travelling to Greece, Japan and California to research and present his two-part documentary on How to Live to 100, broadcast during January 2023. The programme sought to reveal to viewers the secrets of a long, happy and healthy life by examining the lifestyles of the residents of three continents who were approaching 100 years of age.

== Awards and honours ==
Snow received the BAFTA Fellowship, the organisation's highest honour, at the 2015 British Academy Television Awards. He has also won several Royal Television Society awards: two for reports from El Salvador, one for his coverage of the Kegworth air disaster, the 1995 award for Best Male Presenter, and the 1980 award for TV Journalist of the Year for his coverage of Afghanistan, Iran and the Middle East.

Snow declined an OBE because he believes working journalists should not take honours from those about whom they report.

Snow was also awarded the honorary degree of Doctor of Letters by the University of Liverpool in 2011, by Sussex University in 2015 and by Keele University in 2018. He has an honorary degree from the University of Aberdeen.

Snow is an Honorary Fellow of the Royal Institute of British Architects.

== Personal life ==
Snow was once engaged to fellow television newsreader Anna Ford. For 35 years Snow's partner was human rights lawyer Madeleine Colvin, with whom he has two daughters. On 26 March 2010, on the Caribbean island of Mustique, Snow married Precious Lunga, a scientist who was born and raised in Zimbabwe. They had a son together by surrogacy in March 2021. Snow lives in Primrose Hill, north London.

Known as a keen cyclist and advocate of the activity, Snow served as president of CTC Cycling UK from 2007 onwards, to around 2020. When his beloved Condor titanium-framed silver hybrid cycle was stolen from his home, he publicised the theft on his blog and offered £250 reward for its safe return.

Snow served as a governor at Brecknock Primary School, Camden, for many years.

He is the cousin of the journalist and broadcaster Peter Snow.

In June 2026, Snow revealed in an interview with the Daily Mail that he had been diagnosed with Alzheimer's disease.

== See also ==
- List of people who have declined a British honour

Awards and achievements
Preceded by Jeremy Paxman	RTS: Television Journalism; Presenter of the Year; 2003	Succeeded by John Stapleton
Preceded by Jeremy Paxman	RTS: Television Journalism; Presenter of the Year; 2009	Succeeded by Julie Etchingham
Preceded by Julie Etchingham	RTS: Television Journalism; Presenter of the Year; 2011	Succeeded by Anna Botting
Academic offices
Preceded by The Baroness Kennedy of The Shaws	Chancellor of Oxford Brookes University; 2001–2008	Succeeded by Shami Chakrabarti
