= Congressional Caucus on Sri Lanka and Sri Lankan Americans =

The Congressional Caucus on Sri Lanka and Sri Lankan Americans is an informal legislative group that specializes on policy related to Sri Lanka and Sri Lankan Americans.

== Background ==
The caucus, established in 1998, is an informal body that includes members of the United States House of Representatives from both main political parties. It represents Sri Lanka-related concerns in Congress and seeks to promote diplomatic and economic links and contact between people in the two countries.

The caucus adopted a position of opposition to what it viewed as violent tactics of the Liberation Tigers of Tamil Eelam before and during the Sri Lankan Civil War. In February 2006 the Caucus introduced a resolution in the House of Representatives urging productive negotiations between the Government of Sri Lanka and the Liberation Tigers.

The Caucus renewed its registration in July 2017. Its co-chairs at that time were Representatives Robert Aderholt (R‑AL) and Dina Titus (D‑NV).

== Membership ==
The membership of the Congressional Caucus on Sri Lanka and Sri Lankan Americans in 2008 was as follows.

- Frank Pallone, (D‑NJ) (Co-Chair)
- Jerry Weller, (R‑IL) (Co-Chair)
- Robert Andrews, (D‑NJ)
- Shelley Berkley, (D‑NV)
- Joseph Crowley, (D‑NY)
- Lloyd Doggett, (D‑TX)
- John Doolittle, (R‑CA)
- Phillip English, (R‑PA)
- Eni Faleomavaega, (D‑AS)
- Scott Garrett, (R‑NJ)
- Bart Gordon, (D‑TN)
- Al Green, (D‑TX)
- Rush Holt, (D‑NJ)
- Steve Israel, (D‑NJ)
- William Jefferson, (D‑LA)
- Dale Kildee, (D‑MI)
- Jim McDermott, (D‑WA)
- Michael McNulty, (D‑NJ)
- James Moran, (D‑VA)
- William Pascrell, (D‑NJ)
- Donald Payne, (D‑NJ)
- David Price, (D‑NC)
- Chris Van Hollen, (D‑MD)
- Robert Wexler, (D‑FL)
