= One World Media =

British charitable organization

One World Media is a non-profit organisation, registered in the UK as a charitable trust. It is based in London. The organisation describes its aim as supporting strong vibrant and independent media that empower citizens, promote justice and contribute to international development.

The charities activities include: The One World Media Awards, OWM Fellowship, Global Short Docs Forum and OWM Global Reporting Summit.

== One World Media Awards ==
The One World Media Awards are for journalists and filmmakers who work on underreported stories from the global south. They recognise excellence in media coverage of the global south and its social and cultural life. They are presented annually in a ceremony in London. These prizes were described by news presenter Jon Snow as "the awards that people in the industry really want to win".

=== 2022 Awards ===
The 2022 winners were recognised with an online nominees party and live event at BAFTA in London on 16 June 2022. Nominees from Bosnia, Nepal, India, Poland and France travelled to attend in person.

The Special Award was presented to TOLO news.

=== 2012 Awards ===
The One World Media Awards 2012 (24th year) took place on the evening of 8 May at Kings Place, London.

Category	Winner	Organisation/Award to
Journalist of the Year	Jamal Osman	ITN for Channel 4
Radio	Assignment - Haiti Cholera Epidemic	BBC World Service
Television	Sri Lanka's Killing Fields	ITN for Channel 4
Documentary	Sri Lanka's Killing Fields	ITN for Channel 4
New Media	Our Africa	SOS Children's Villages UK
News	Nato units left 61 migrants to die of hunger and thirst	The Guardian
Drama	Otelo Burning	Otelo Burning Films
Children's Rights	Africa Investigates: Spell of the Albino	InsightNewsTV for Al Jazeera English
Press	The Rape of Men	The Observer
Popular Features	Toughest Place to be a Binman	BBC Two
Sustainable Development	There Once Was An Island	On the Level Productions
Student	Bagong Silang	Zena Merton, Giselle Santos and Stefan Werc, London College of Communication
Special	Stolen Childhood	Adanech Admassu and Gem TV, Ethiopia

=== 2013 Awards ===
The 25th annual One World Media Awards took place on Tuesday 7 May at Kings Place in London.

Category	Winner	Organisation/Award to
International Journalist of the Year	Sue Lloyd-Roberts	BBC Newsnight
Radio	Assignment/ Crossing Continents: Uzbekistan	BBC World
Television	Unreported World: The Master Chef of Mogadishu	Channel 4
Documentary	In The Shadow Of The Sun/ Storyville: The Albino Witchcraft Murders	Inroad Films and Century Films for BBC Storyville
New Voice	Tahir Qadiry	BBC Persian
News	Somali Justice	Channel 4 News
Press	Death Metal	Guardian Weekend Magazine
Student	Almost Famous	Vincent Du, Goldsmiths
Special	Objective TV, Azerbaijan

== Staff, trustees and patrons ==
The current director is Gemma Bradshaw.

The Trustees of One World Media are:

- Samir Shah, Chief Executive and Creative Director of Juniper TV. (Chair)
- Charlotte Alfred, Investigative journalist and editor.
- Victoria Bridges, Documentary Producer & Director.
- Godfrey Cromwell, Member of the House of Lords.
- Juan Flames, Managing Director, Barclays.
- Monica Garnsey, Executive Producer in TV Current Affairs.
- Joel Kibazo, Founding Partner, JK Associates.
- Muriel Lamin, Head of Business Development, BBC World Service.
- Liliane Landor, Head of Foreign News, Channel 4.
- Carol Nahra, Professor, Journalist and Producer.

Current patrons of One World Media include Jon Snow. Previous patrons Zeinab Badawi, Michael Buerk and Jonathan Dimbleby.
