= Sri Lanka's Killing Fields: War Crimes Unpunished =

- Genre: Documentary
- Directed by: Callum Macrae
- Presented by: Jon Snow
- Narrated by: Jon Snow
- Composer: Wayne Roberts
- Country of origin: United Kingdom
- Original languages: English; Tamil; Sinhala
- No. of episodes: 1

Production
- Executive producer: Chris Shaw
- Producer: Callum Macrae
- Production locations: Sri Lanka; United Kingdom
- Running time: 50 minutes
- Production company: ITN Productions

Original release
- Network: Channel 4
- Release: 14 March 2012

Related
- Sri Lanka's Killing Fields; No Fire Zone : In the Killing Fields of Sri Lanka

Sri Lanka's Killing Fields: War Crimes Unpunished is an investigatory documentary about the final weeks of the Sri Lankan Civil War broadcast by the British TV station Channel 4 on 14 March 2012. It was a sequel to the award-winning Sri Lanka's Killing Fields which was broadcast by Channel 4 in June 2011. Made by film maker Callum Macrae, this documentary focused on four specific cases and investigated who was responsible for them. Using amateur video from the conflict zone filmed by civilians and Sri Lankan soldiers, photographs and statements by civilians, soldiers and United Nations workers, the documentary traced ultimate responsibility for the cases to Sri Lanka's political and military leaders. The documentary was made by ITN Productions and presented by Jon Snow, the main anchor on Channel 4 News. The Sri Lankan government has denied all the allegations in the documentary.

== Background ==
During the final months of the Sri Lankan civil war in 2009 and after its end in May 2009 evidence in the form of video, photographs etc. started emerging showing what appeared to be gross violations of international and humanitarian law by both the Sri Lankan military and the rebel Liberation Tigers of Tamil Eelam (LTTE). British broadcaster Channel 4 was one of a number of foreign media organisations who publicised this evidence. In August 2009 Channel 4 News broadcast video showing naked and blindfolded victims being executed by Sri Lankan soldiers. The Sri Lankan government denounced the video as fake but forensic analysis by independent experts and the United Nations confirmed that the video was genuine. In November 2010 Channel 4 News broadcast additional video of the same incident. On 14 June 2011 Channel 4 broadcast a 50-minute documentary called Sri Lanka's Killing Fields which featured amateur video from the conflict zone filmed by civilians and Sri Lankan soldiers depicting "horrific war crimes". This documentary received significant international publicity, eliciting reactions from foreign governments and international human rights groups. The documentary was re-broadcast in India, Australia and Norway. It was also screened specially for legislators in Washington, D.C., Brussels, Ottawa and Wellington. The Sri Lankan government denounced the documentary as a fake. It subsequently released a documentary titled Lies Agreed Upon which claimed to counter the allegations made in Sri Lanka's Killing Fields but failed to deal with the specific incidents detailed by Sri Lanka's Killing Fields. In November 2011 Channel 4 announced that it had commissioned a follow-up film Sri Lanka's Killing Fields: War Crimes Unpunished from ITN Productions with new evidence concerning the final days of the conflict.

== Broadcast details ==
On 11 March 2012 Channel 4 premièred Sri Lanka's Killing Fields: War Crimes Unpunished at the 10th International Film Festival and Forum on Human Rights being held at the same time as the 19th session of the United Nations Human Rights Council in Geneva. Channel 4 broadcast the documentary to UK audiences on 14 March 2012 at 10:55 pm.

== Reviews and aftermath ==
The Guardian's Sam Wollaston described the documentary as "a proper piece of journalism that asked serious questions of President Mahinda Rajapaksa and his brother the defence secretary – questions that should be asked in a war crimes trial". Giving the documentary 4½ stars, The Daily Telegraph's James Walton noted that the documentary had proceeded so carefully and left little to chance that it was impossible sustain any objections. The Independent's Tom Sutcliffe described the documentary as "essentially a work of frustration, a reiteration of the original charges and a repeat of a call for action that went nowhere last time" thought it did have some new facts. David Butcher of the Radio Times found the documentary to be "excruciating...but the evidence of serious and sustained war crimes looks irresistible — with the apparent culprits still sitting at the top of the country’s government".

The musician and activist M.I.A. expressed support for the film and its makers, stating "This C4 #killingfields doc makes the points I couldn't make".

== Reaction ==
Sri Lanka - The Sri Lankan High Commission in London issued a statement on 15 March 2012 which accused the documentary of broadcasting "highly spurious and uncorroborated allegations" and of falsely implicating members of the Sri Lankan government and senior military figures. The statement went on to reject the "malicious allegations" made by the documentary's producers and alleged that the timing of the documentary was a "cynical" attempt to gather support for a resolution against Sri Lanka at the UNHRC. The Sri Lankan military condemned the documentary as "sensationalism" saying that most of its contents weren't new, they had been broadcast on the first documentary.

United Kingdom - British Foreign Office Minister Alistair Burt issued a statement on 15 March 2012 in which he noted that "Once again, Channel 4 has brought to international attention important and disturbing evidence to support allegations of grave abuses in Sri Lanka". Burt stated that since the end of the civil war the international community had "called for an independent, credible and thorough investigation into alleged war crimes on both sides of the conflict" and that Channel 4's documentaries reinforced the need for that investigation.

== See also ==
- Darfur Now
- Fallujah, The Hidden Massacre
