= Frances Harrison =

British journalist (born 1966)

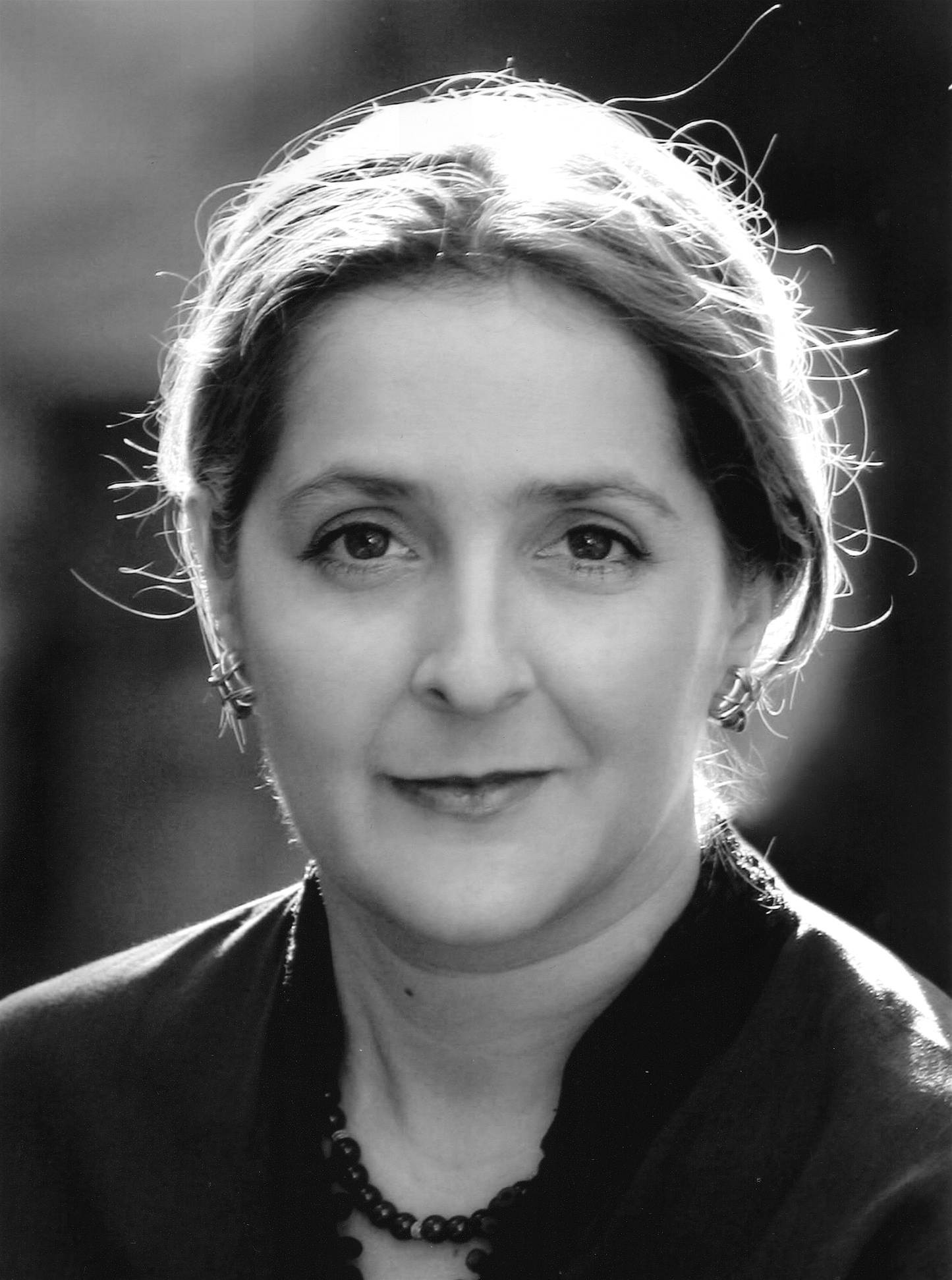
Frances Harrison

Frances Harrison (born 13 May, 1966) is a British journalist who worked with the BBC. She read English literature at Trinity Hall, Cambridge and did an MA in South Asian Area Studies at the School of Oriental and African Studies at London University and an MBA at Imperial College London.

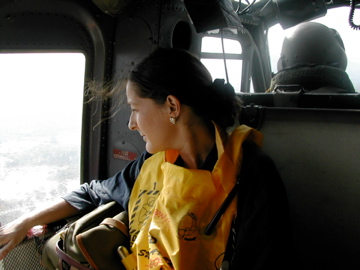
Frances Harrison

She has been BBC Correspondent in the following countries:

- 2011 to 2011 Head of News, Amnesty International, London
- 2008 to 2009 Scholarship to Imperial College Business School, MBA
- 2007 to 2008 London Religious Reporter
- 2004 to 2007 Iran (she was bureau chief of the BBC's Tehran office)
- 2000 to 2004 Sri Lanka
- 1998 to 2000 Malaysia
- 1996 to 1998 Bangladesh
- 1993 to 1994 Pakistan

Journalist & Author of a book on Sri Lanka called Still Counting the Dead published by Portobello Books in the UK in October 2012 and in Canada by House of Anansi i & in India by Penguin.

She has been a visiting research fellow at Oxford University and at the Institute of Commonwealth Studies where she wrote a handbook on Bangladesh. http://commonwealth.sas.ac.uk/research/islamic-parties-and-elections-bangladesh Website: www.stillcountingthedead.com

She is the Director of the International Truth and Justice Project.

Reviews of Still Counting the Dead: Financial Times, Victory at all Costs ."Ultimately, it is hard to read this book and not agree with the need for a fuller reckoning". The Observer, Survivors of the bloody last months of Sri Lanka's civil war tell a story of injustice and horror that we cannot continue to ignore. "Anybody who has worked on Sri Lanka knows this story has had too little impact. With luck, this book can help change that". Feature in the National Post: "It’s essential that the rest of the world open its eyes to the country’s bloody deeds." Review in Monsoon Journal: "An extraordinary book brilliantly crafted on stories from the survivors of the horrible war in Sri Lanka." The Hindu: Untold Stories, Unseen War ‘.. it seems ironic that journalists often put between the covers of a book information that by definition ought to have made it to news columns or channels’. The Financial Express, An Account of Victory from the Perspective of the Defeated . The Hindu Chennai, Killings at End Stage of Lanka Civil War Unprecedented .

== Family ==
She is married to Kasra Naji, an Iranian journalist working for the BBC and they have one son.
