= Valour Building =

Canadian Government office building in Ottawa

Coordinates: 45°25′18″N 75°42′03″W

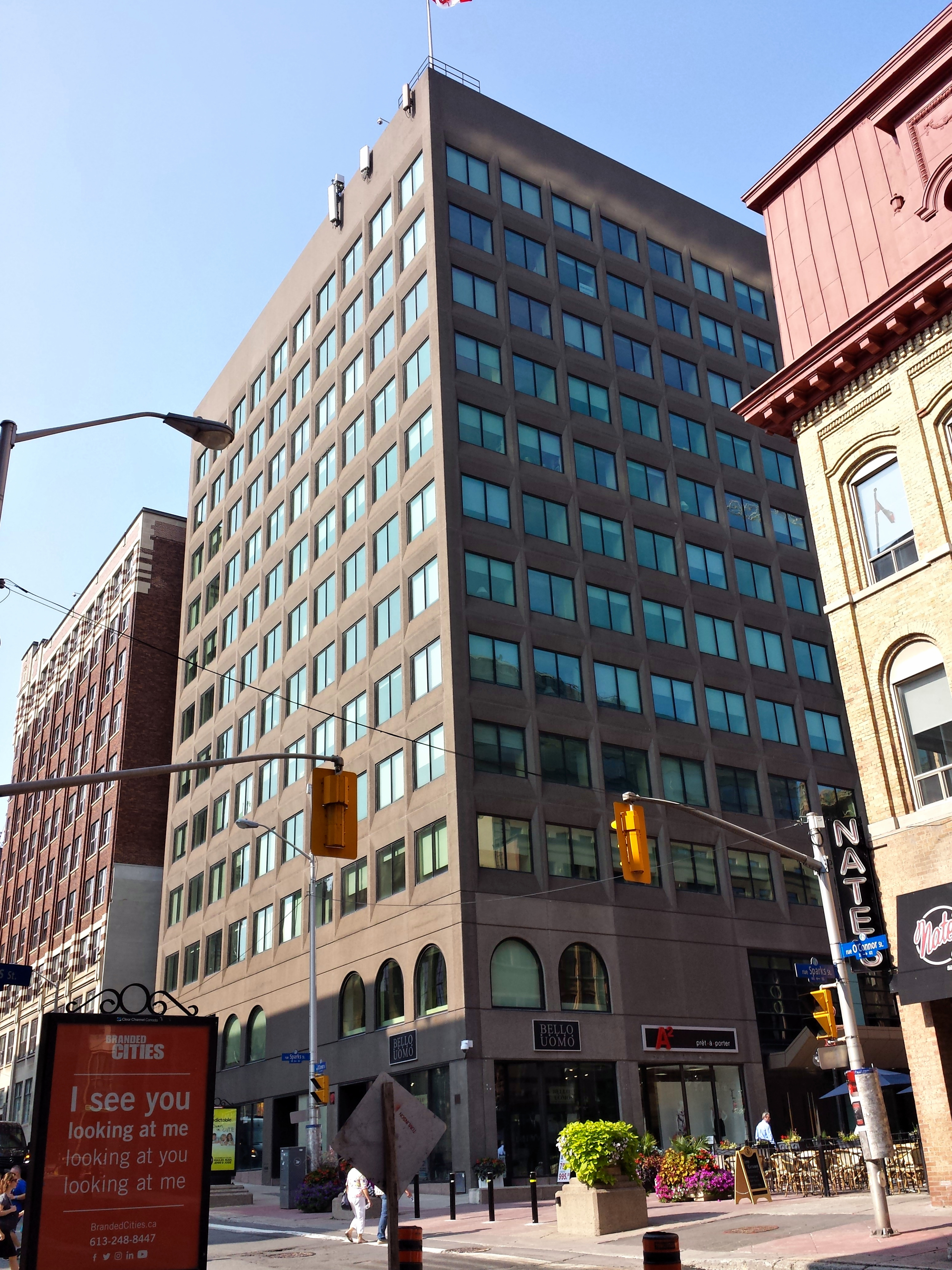
Valour Building

The Valour Building, formerly La Promenade Building, is an office building in Ottawa owned by the Canadian department of Public Works and Government Services. Built in 1972, the 12-storey building is located at 151 Sparks Street and was previously the offices of House of Commons, Parliamentary Precinct Services, and Library of Parliament employees.

In 2010, the building was used as temporary space for parliamentarians during the renovations of the West Block of Parliament. Afterwards, La Promenade was renovated and became permanent offices again.

In 2014 the name of the building was changed to the Valour Building to honour individuals who had been awarded the Star of Military Valour during the Afghanistan conflict.
