= The Cage (Weiss book) =

2011 book by Gordon Weiss

- UK edition front cover
- Author: Gordon Weiss
- Language: English
- Publisher: The Bodley Head
- Publication date: 19 May 2011
- Publication place: United Kingdom
- Pages: 352
- ISBN: 1-84792-139-6

The Cage: The fight for Sri Lanka & the Last Days of the Tamil Tigers is a book about the final stages of the Sri Lankan Civil War written by journalist and former United Nations official Gordon Weiss. Weiss was the UN's spokesman in Sri Lanka during the final months of the civil war. Since leaving the UN Weiss has been a vocal critic of the conduct of both the Sri Lankan military and the rebel Liberation Tigers of Tamil Eelam. Weiss believes that war crimes were committed during the final stages of the civil war and has called for an international investigation. According to Weiss up to 40,000 civilians may have been killed in the final stages of the civil war.

In the book Weiss recounts "in chilling detail" the final stages of the civil war, how the Sri Lankan military achieved victory and the price paid for peace by all of Sri Lanka's ethnic communities. It details how hundreds of thousands of civilians were held hostage by the Tamil Tigers in an ever-decreasing area (the cage) in northern Sri Lanka. Weiss tries to piece together events which unfolded inside the cage which had been sealed off from most independent observers by the Sri Lankan military. The book provides context to the findings of the UN panel. It also provides a history of Sri Lanka and "unpicks" the root causes of the civil war. It suggests that the country's history is full of brutal savagery. Weiss is highly critical of the Tigers but he reserves his strongest condemnation for the Sri Lankan military and the international community. Weiss believes that the Sri Lankan military could have avoided high civilian casualties if it wanted to but it chose not to do so. The international community contributed to the slaughter of the civilians by its collective "shoulder shrugging". The UN's unwillingness to provide casualty figures also contributed to the "zero civilian casualties" myth. Weiss believes that the civil war could have been averted if the grievances of the Tamils had been addressed.
