= Sri Lanka's Killing Fields =

2011 Channel 4 television documentary

- Genre: Documentary
- Directed by: Callum Macrae
- Presented by: Jon Snow
- Narrated by: Jon Snow
- Composer: Wayne Roberts
- Country of origin: United Kingdom
- Original languages: English, Tamil, Sinhala
- No. of episodes: 1

Production
- Executive producer: Chris Shaw
- Producer: Callum Macrae
- Production locations: Sri Lanka, UK
- Running time: 49 minutes
- Production company: ITN Productions

Original release
- Network: Channel 4
- Release: 14 June 2011

Related
- Sri Lanka's Killing Fields: War Crimes Unpunished

Sri Lanka's Killing Fields is an investigatory documentary about the war crimes during the final stages of the Sri Lankan Civil War, broadcast by the British TV station Channel 4 on 14 June 2011. Described as one of the most graphic documentaries in British TV history, it featured amateur video from the conflict zone filmed by civilians and Sri Lankan soldiers which depicted "horrific war crimes".

The video filmed by civilians included scenes during and after intense shelling of civilian targets, including hospitals, by the Sri Lankan military. The "trophy video" filmed by Sri Lankan soldiers showed scenes of blindfolded victims being executed and dead bodies of naked women being dragged onto trucks by soldiers as they made lewd remarks about the victims.

The documentary also included interviews with civilians who managed to survive the conflict, United Nations staff based in Sri Lanka during the conflict, human rights organisations, and an international law expert. The documentary was made by ITN Productions and presented by Jon Snow, of Channel 4 News.

The Sri Lankan government has denounced the documentary as a fake and the Defence Ministry produced a documentary named Lies Agreed Upon, countering allegations made in the movie.

Sri Lanka's Killing Fields elicited reactions from foreign governments, international human rights groups, and various public figures. The film was nominated for a BAFTA TV Award for Best Current Affairs documentary and won the Current Affairs – International category of the Royal Television Society's Television Journalism Awards 2010–2011. Furthermore, the documentary won two One World Media Awards in 2012 in the categories "Television" and "Documentary". In November 2011 Channel 4 announced that it had commissioned a follow-up film Sri Lanka's Killing Fields: War Crimes Unpunished from ITN Productions with new evidence concerning the final days of the conflict, broadcast in March 2012.

== Background ==
During the final months of the Sri Lankan civil war in 2009 and after its end in May 2009 evidence in the form of video, photographs, etc. started emerging showing what appeared to gross violations of international and humanitarian law by both the Sri Lankan military and the rebel group Liberation Tigers of Tamil Eelam (LTTE). British broadcaster Channel 4 was one of a number of foreign media organisations who publicised this evidence. In August 2009 Channel 4 News broadcast video showing naked and blindfolded victims being executed by Sri Lankan soldiers. The Sri Lankan government denounced the video as fake, but forensic analysis by independent experts and the United Nations have confirmed that the video is genuine. In November 2010 Channel 4 News broadcast additional video of the same incident.

== Broadcast details ==
On 3 June 2011 Channel 4 premièred a special hour-long investigation into the final weeks of the civil war titled Sri Lanka's Killing Fields at the 17th session of the United Nations Human Rights Council in Geneva. Channel 4 broadcast the documentary to UK audiences on 14 June 2011 at 11:05 pm. The documentary was watched by an estimated 700,000 to 1 million viewers and drew a lot of international publicity. In an unusual move Channel 4 waived its international copyright, allowing viewers from outside the UK to view the documentary on its on-demand service and via YouTube.

=== International broadcasts ===
The documentary was broadcast in Australia on 4 July 2011 at 8:30 pm on ABC1's Four Corners programme. It was repeated on 5 July 2011 at 11:35 pm on ABC1 and on 9 July 2011 at 8:00 pm on ABC News 24.

The documentary was broadcast in India on 8 July 2011 at 8:00 pm on Headlines Today. It was repeated on 9 July 2011 at 10:00 pm.

The documentary was broadcast in Norway on 27 September 2011 at 10:30 pm on NRK2.

=== Special screenings ===
Amnesty International, Human Rights Watch, International Crisis Group, Open Society Foundations and the Tom Lantos Human Rights Commission jointly screened the documentary at the Congressional Auditorium, Washington, D.C., on 15 July 2011 to an audience of senators, congressmen, officials, and diplomats.

Three cross-party New Zealand MPs (Jackie Blue, Keith Locke and Maryan Street) jointly screened the documentary at the Beehive Theatrette in Wellington on 16 August 2011 to an audience of parliamentarians and political activists.

Human Rights Watch and three cross-party Canadian MPs (Patrick Brown, John McKay and Rathika Sitsabaiesan) jointly screened the documentary at the La Promenade Building, Ottawa on 28 September 2011.

Amnesty International, Human Rights Watch, and the International Crisis Group jointly screened the documentary at the European Parliament, Brussels on 12 October 2011.

== Content ==
=== Interviews ===
The documentary featured interviews with Benjamin Dix, a British UN worker based in Kilinochchi; Gordon Weiss, the UN's official spokesman in Sri Lanka during the final stages of the civil war; William Schabas, international human rights lawyer and academic; Vany Kumar, a British Tamil who had been trapped in the conflict zone; Steve Crawshaw of Amnesty International; a number of civilians who had been trapped in the conflict zone; and Sinhalese critics of the government.

According to Dix from September 2008 there were a number of air raids (by the Sri Lankan Air Force) each day on Kilinochchi, often at night. The Sri Lankan government told the UN that they could no longer guarantee their safety and that they must leave Kilinochchi and other Tamil Tiger-held areas. According to Gordon Weiss the Sri Lankan government regarded the UN as an "impediment" to their defeat of the Tamil Tigers.

By removing the aid agency from the Tamil Tiger areas, there were no longer any international witnesses to the Sri Lankan military's actions, charged Weiss. When the UN announced it was evacuating all its staff from Kilinochchi, hundreds of local civilians, fearing an all-out onslaught on the town by the Sri Lankan military, went to the UN office on 15 September 2008 and pleaded with the UN staff not to leave.

Dix filmed the scene on his camcorder: "They were pleading with us...'please don't leave'...There was one girl..she wasn't shouting and she wasn't chanting, she was just still but she had real sadness in her face...Her face just really captured this 'have compassion...stay and watch'". A Hindu priest pleaded with Dix stay, not to provide food and shelter but to be witnesses: "We are begging you to stay and witness our suffering. If we allow you to leave the truth is that everyone here will die. The knife is at our throat." The UN, accepting the Sri Lankan governments warning and ignoring the pleas of the local civilians, left Kilinochchi.

"It was their greatest hour of need. They had an army sitting on the doorstep...and we drove out. That was ...a real sense of abandonment of these people" stated Dix. Weiss believes the UN's decision to leave Kilinochchi to be a mistake. The removal of the UN staff from Kilinochchi left virtually no international witnesses in the area. After the UN had withdrawn, the Sri Lankan military launched a massive offensive into the Tamil Tiger-held areas and captured Kilinochchi in January 2009. Hundreds of thousands of civilians fled the onslaught. Over the following four months they were trapped in an ever-decreasing area and constantly bombed by the Sri Lankan military. Tens of thousands died as result of deliberate Sri Lankan military fire. The harrowing ordeal suffered by the civilians was filmed.

International human rights lawyer and academic William Schabas believes that mass executions of prisoners were possible evidence of systematic abuse, and this could therefore implicate Sri Lanka's political and military leadership in the war crimes of summary executions, killings, and torture.

The documentary featured an interview with a Sinhalese critic of the government who claimed to have a collection of photographs of summary executions and killings of those who surrendered by the Sri Lankan military. He claimed the photos were taken by a high-ranking army officer on his personal camera. In one photo there are dozens of dead bodies laid out in rows, many of whom appeared to have been executed. Soldiers are standing around the bodies, some taking video clips using mobile phones.

Other photos show the dead, naked bodies of B. Nadesan and S. Pulidevan, two Tamil Tiger leaders who had tried to surrender. Numerous other photos were shown and all the photos were analysed by a forensic pathologist. The pathologist found that "there is very high incidence of lethal gunshot wounds to the head, raising the strong suspicion of executions at the time of surrender with aimed head shots to stationary, highly visible targets" and that there is "compelling evidence of systematic executions and likely sexual assault of female prisoners prior to execution".

=== Civilian video ===
The documentary showed numerous clips from the conflict zone recording the harrowing ordeal endured by civilians.

One of the video clips shows the hospital at Puthukkudiyiruppu with government shells firing in the background. Patients are seen lying on the floor with debris all around them. A woman patient laments, "I was wounded so I came to hospital, and the situation in hospital is like this". Another woman cries, "My legs have been wounded in the shelling. I can't move. I can't get up". The shelling intensified and eventually the doctors were forced to abandon the hospital.

A number of video clips are shown of civilian camps being shelled and the ensuing terror. In one clip civilians are seen sheltering in a shallow bunker as the area is bombed. "Don't take the video," a distraught woman in the bunker pleads with the cameraman. "Please get in the bunker. What are you going to do with the video? They are killing everyone. Please God save all of these children. Can you hear us?"

=== Soldiers' video ===
The documentary showed a number of video clips filmed by Sri Lankan soldiers on mobile phones, most of which were previously unaired.

In the first clip, which was originally broadcast on Channel 4 News on 25 August 2009, armed soldiers are seen abusing naked, blindfolded men (believed to be Tamil Tiger prisoners) with hands tied behind their backs. "Straighten up. Fuck you!" a soldier shouts as he kicks one of the naked men on his back. Another soldier then shoots the naked man in the head, killing him. "It's like he saw. He looked, then he looked away," a soldier is heard saying in the background. All the soldiers are speaking Sinhala.

Another shot is heard in the background as the cameraman pans around to show other dead naked bodies, all with blindfolds and hands tied behind their backs. A live naked, blindfolded man with his hands tied behind his back is brought to the area by a soldier and sat down on the ground. The soldier takes a few steps back before shooting the naked man in the head, killing him. "Shoot! Shoot! I've shot as well. Shoot!", a soldier is heard shouting in the background as more shots are heard in the background. "These are our state property. Let's shoot!" the soldier laughs. Another soldier is shown shooting a prisoner. This video was authenticated by the UN, but the Sri Lankan government maintains it is a fake.

In the second clip two men and a woman in civilian clothes but believed to be Tamil Tiger prisoners are shown blindfolded, hands tied behind their backs and sitting on the ground. They are surrounded by soldiers. One of the soldiers is heard egging another soldier (in Sinhala) to shoot the three prisoners. "Is there no one with the balls to kill a terrorist?" he asks. "Of course there is. Shut up!" answers another soldier. "Come here. What's the matter with you?" asks one of the soldiers to another. "Hey cunt! Don't be a wimp," shouts a soldier. The commanding officer issues orders: "Shoot on my command. Up! Take aim! This bugger has a weapon and still seems scared of a terrorist. Aim directly at the head. OK..ready? Up!"

All three prisoners are shot in the head. According to the documentary this clip has been analysed by experts who say it shows no sign of manipulation and appears to show genuine executions. The clip was taken on 15 May 2009.

In one clip a half-naked prisoner is shown tied to a coconut tree with blood over his chest and neck. The documentary then showed photos of the same incident which show the prisoner alive, then threatened with a knife, and then dead, draped in the Tamil Tiger (which is also the Tamil Eelam flag) flag. According to legal expert William Schabas, this scene is strong circumstantial evidence of a war crime.

In another clip soldiers are shown clearing away dead naked bodies. "Mother fucking Tiger wankers!" shouts a soldier. "Hey...pose with the bodies," he continues.

In another clip soldiers are shown dragging and dumping dead naked bodies of women, many of which appear to have been abused, onto the back of a truck. One of the soldiers is heard saying, "She is moaning now". "Moaning in your head?" asks another soldier, "Still moaning?" "This one has the best figure," says one of the soldiers of one of the dead woman.

In another clip, soldiers are seen standing around dead bodies. One soldier kicks the head of a body. One of the bodies is a naked woman. "She looks like someone who's newly joined. She looks like someone's clerk. Look how many pencils and pens she's got. I really want to cut her tits off...if no one was around," says a soldier.

On 18 May 2011 the Sri Lankan government announced that senior Tamil Tiger commander Colonel Ramesh had died. But video clips taken by soldiers showed Ramesh alive in captivity. A photo then showed the dead body of Ramesh with wounds and blood on his head. The body was identified as Ramesh's by his wife. Channel 4 claimed that this evidence suggested that Ramesh was killed after being captured.

== Awards ==
The documentary won the Current Affairs – International category of the Royal Television Society's Television Journalism Awards 2010–2011. The RTS described the "meticulous investigative documentary" as "a unique, disturbing and convincing account of what was supposed to be a war carried out well away from public view". Furthermore, the documentary won two One World Media Awards in the categories "Television" and "Documentary". In 2012, the film was nominated for a BAFTA TV Award in "Current Affairs".

== Criticism ==
Sri Lanka's Killing Fields has also come under criticism for bias and technical inconsistencies in some of the footage featured. Shyam Tekwani, an expert in terrorism and media at the Asia-Pacific Center for Security Studies who has extensively covered the Sri Lankan conflict, compared the "tone and tenor" of the documentary to that of productions by the LTTE's propaganda wing, and opined that "Clearly an effort to sensationalise and shock with carefully selected and edited footage, the documentary weakens its case and invites an investigation into its own credibility and accountability to journalistic norms.

"The volume of testimony it uses as evidence is not enormous, and most of it is derived from leading questions. The slant is pronounced." Shyam Tekwani's views expressed were those of the author and did not necessarily represent the official position of the Asia-Pacific Center for Security Studies which is part of the United States Department of Defense."

A. A. Gill, reviewing the documentary in The Sunday Times, described the footage shown as "unattributed and uncorroborated" and wrote, "Not a second of this has been shot by Channel 4; none of the eyewitness accounts comes from journalists". He criticised Jon Snow's narration as "intemperate and partisan", and stated that "it was all held together by assumptions".

In a technical analysis of the mobile phone footage on behalf of Sri Lanka's Lessons Learnt and Reconciliation Commission, E. A. Yfantis, a professor of computer science at University of Nevada-Las Vegas specialising in computer graphics and image processing, stated that "based on mathematical analysis, blood in the 3GP videos is not real blood. It is not clear if the blood in the 3GP scenes is water with red dye or digitally constructed or edited video blood" and that "videographic and mathematical analysis of the two 3GP videos show that the videos either were edited or staged or both".

He concluded that "Careful analysis of the two 3GP videos which included both frame by frame visual inspection as well as the robust mathematical attributes of the video frames has led us to the conclusion that this is a very deliberate and orchestrated video". The report also detailed the fact that the video file was named "produce.3gp", suggesting that the video file may have been a result of some form of video editing software.

== Reaction ==
=== Australia ===
Australian Foreign Minister Kevin Rudd stated that "No-one watching this program could emerge from that undisturbed and we don't either". He called on the United Nations Human Rights Council to re-investigate alleged war crimes and examine whether the UNHRC's original findings [resolution A/HRC/S-11/L.1/Rev.2 passed on 27 May 2009] "can any longer be regarded as well founded". The Australian Senate passed motion number 323 on 7 July 2011 which, amongst other things, noted that the documentary was "further shocking evidence supporting allegations of war crimes committed during the 2009 civil conflict in Sri Lanka" and called for "allegations of war crimes...to be investigated and verified".

=== India ===
Asked to comment on the documentary, the official spokesman for the Indian Ministry of External Affairs stated on 15 July 2011 "Our focus is on the welfare and the well being of the Tamil- speaking minorities of Northern and Eastern Sri Lanka...The sequence of events during the last days of the conflict is unclear. The Government of Sri Lanka would need to go into the matter in greater detail. The concerns that are being expressed in this regard need to be examined".

=== Sri Lanka ===
The Sri Lankan government denounced the documentary as a fake and the work of the LTTE-supporting Sri Lankan Tamil diaspora. Defence Secretary Gotabaya Rajapaksa, brother of the country's President Mahinda Rajapaksa, accused LTTE supporters of bribing Channel 4 to broadcast the documentary, stating "pro-LTTE elements have used the Channel 4 news agency after giving money to them [Channel 4] in order to tarnish the image of both the Sri Lankan government as well as the army".

In a lecture at the Sri Lanka Foundation Institute in Colombo on 24 July 2011 former President of Sri Lanka Chandrika Kumaratunga described her UK-living children's reaction to the documentary: "I shall remember till the end of my days the morning when my 28 year-old son called me, sobbing on the phone to say how ashamed he was to call himself as Sinhalese and a Lankan after he saw on the UK television a 50 minute documentary called Killing Fields of Sri Lanka. My daughter followed suit, saying similar things and expressing shock and horror that our countrymen could indulge in such horrific acts."

=== United Kingdom ===
British Foreign Office Minister Alistair Burt issued a statement on 15 June 2011 in which he expressed shock at horrific scenes in the documentary. Burt stated that the documentary, along with other evidence, constituted "convincing evidence of violations of international humanitarian and human rights law" and urged the Sri Lankan government "to give a serious and full response".

=== United States ===
In the United States, Congressman Jim McGovern, co-chair of the Tom Lantos Human Rights Commission, described the contents of the documentary as "a gruesome example of humans at their worst". He went on to say "These scenes provide much more than simply shock value, however. They also are powerful evidence of the need for an independent investigation to hold those responsible accountable for the crimes...If the Sri Lankan government is unable or unwilling to act, then the international community must respond in its place".

== Aftermath ==
Part of the broadcast aired on Channel 4 News in August 2009 inspired the music video and artwork to the M.I.A. song "Born Free" released in May 2010. Other activists including Jan Jananayagam of Tamils Against Genocide expressed support for the film.

Between 14 June 2011 and 4 July 2011 the British TV regulator Ofcom received 171 complaints about the documentary. The majority of the complaints were that the documentary was representational and misleading rather than that the contents of the documentary were fake as suggested by the Sri Lankan government. The levels of complaints automatically triggered a formal investigation by Ofcom (Ofcom had received 13 complaints up to 13 June 2011, which were all rejected as the documentary hadn't been broadcast yet).

In October, Ofcom dismissed all complaints. Dismissing the complaints of impartiality, offensiveness, and misleading material, Ofcom concluded that "overall, Channel 4 preserved due impartiality in its examination of the Sri Lankan Government's actions...the audience was not materially misled...the images included in this programme, whilst brutal and shocking, would not have exceeded the expectations of the audience for this Channel 4 documentary scheduled well after the watershed with very clear warnings about the nature of the content".

On 1 July 2011 Swarnavahini, a privately owned Sri Lankan TV station, broadcast on their Live at 8 programme what they claimed to be an unaltered version of a video used on the Channel 4 documentary showing uniformed men summarily executing eight bound and blindfolded men. In the version broadcast by Swarnavahini the men in uniform were speaking in Tamil whereas on the Channel 4 documentary they were speaking in Sinhala. This Tamil version was in fact not new – it had appeared on YouTube shortly after Channel 4 News had originally broadcast the Sinhala version on 25 August 2009. An investigation by a UN commissioned panel of independent experts found that the Sinhala version was authentic.

Kandanam Jegadishwaram (Nandavanam Jagatheeswaram), a British national of Tamil origin, was arrested on 4 July 2011 for allegedly supplying Channel 4 with video which was used in the documentary. The police alleged that 71 CDs were found at Jegadishwaram's residence in Kandy. Jegadishwaram was brought before Colombo Magistrate's Court on 8 July 2011 where the Criminal Investigation Department accused him of causing "disrepute to the country and the army by providing alleged videos to the Channel 4 television". The magistrate allowed the CID to detain and interrogate Jegadishwaram until 2 August 2011. The magistrate released Jegadishwaram on 2 August 2011 after it was revealed that he was not involved and that no suspicious material or evidence was found.

In August 2011, Indian TV channel Headlines Today broadcast a two-part documentary titled Inside Sri Lanka's Killing Fields. The first part was broadcast on 9 August 2011 on the channel's Ground Zero programme and subtitled I Witnessed Genocide. The second part was broadcast on 10 August 2011 on the channel's Centre Stage programme and subtitled Lankan Army killed 40,000 Tamils. The documentary makers travelled to Vanni and interviewed witnesses to the last stages of the civil war who described "serious violations of international conventions and laws on the prevention of war crimes".

In November 2011, Channel 4 announced that it had commissioned a follow-up film Sri Lanka's Killing Fields: War Crimes Unpunished from ITN Productions with new evidence concerning the final days of the conflict. This documentary was broadcast on 14 March 2012 at 10:55 pm to coincide with the 19th session of the United Nations Human Rights Council in Geneva.

Sri Lanka Ministry of Defence produced a documentary named Lies Agreed Upon, as a response to counter the allegations made in Sri Lanka's Killing Fields.

== See also ==
- Darfur Now
- Fallujah, The Hidden Massacre
- Sexual violence against Tamils in Sri Lanka
