= Callum Macrae =

Scottish filmmaker

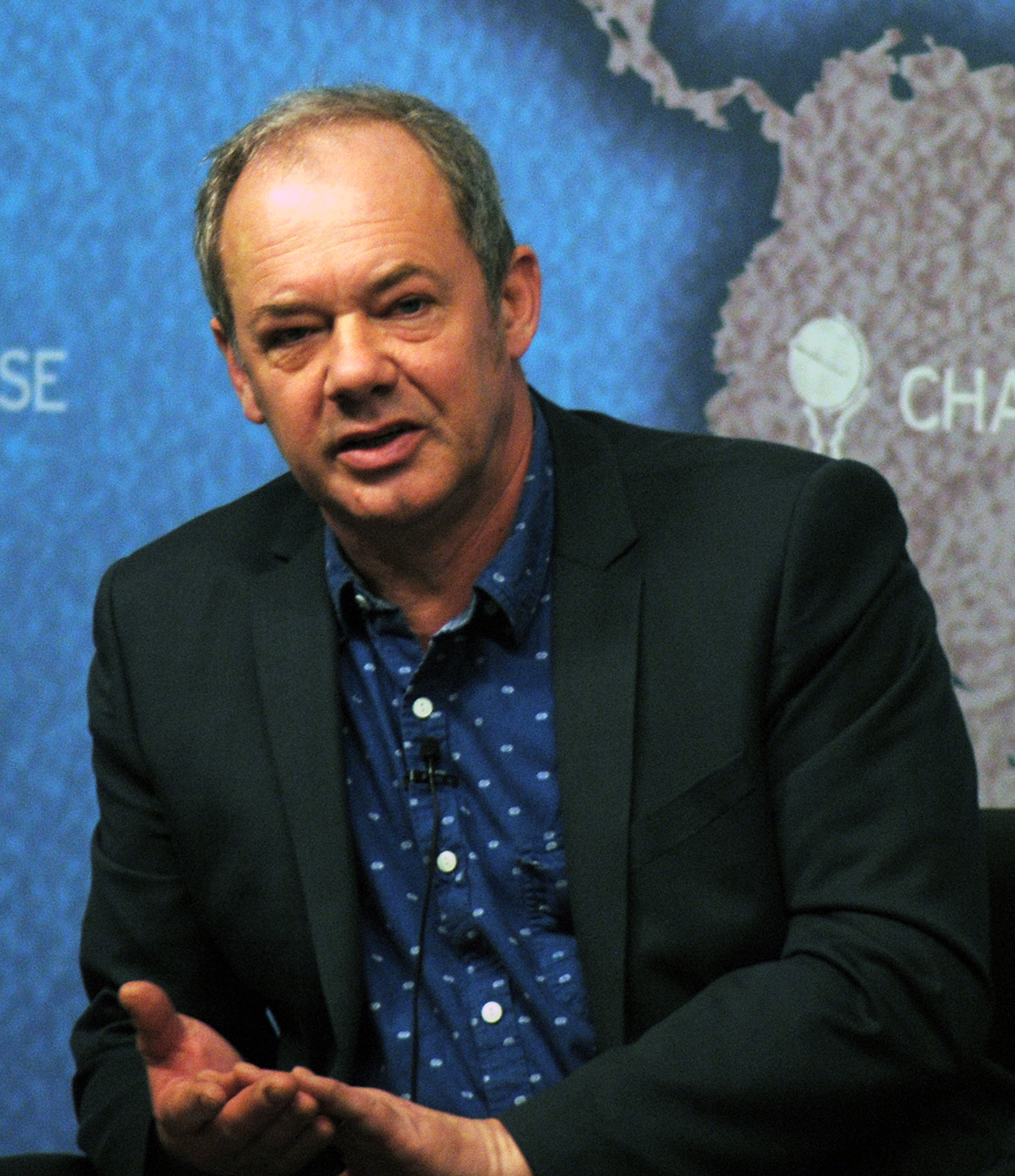
- Macrae at Chatham House in 2013
- Occupations: Journalist, filmmaker and writer
- Known for: Documentary filmmaking and print journalism

Callum Macrae is a Scottish filmmaker, writer and journalist currently with Outsider Television, which he had co-founded with Alex Sutherland in 1993.

An Emmy, BAFTA and Grierson nominee, he has been making films for 20 years in the UK and around the world, including Iraq, Sri Lanka, Japan, Haiti and several in Africa, covering wars and conflicts in Côte d'Ivoire, Uganda, Mali, and Sudan.

== Biography ==
Callum Macrae grew up in Nigeria and Scotland. He studied painting at Edinburgh College of Art for five years, was a dustman for two years, ran a pirate radio station for six months and was a teacher for seven years. He was a member of the Official Edinburgh Festival's governing Council and President of Edinburgh and District Trades Council.

== Writing ==
For two years he produced a weekly satirical cartoon strip for the Times Educational Supplement. He then became a full-time writer working initially for a variety of newspapers and magazines including The Scotsman, The Herald and The Guardian. He joined The Observer as Scottish correspondent, where he stayed for three years winning the Campaigning Journalist of the Year award in 1992.

== Filmmaker ==
In 1992, he moved into television, presenting and reporting on Channel 4's weekly magazine programs Hard News, and investigative legal series The Brief.

With Alex Sutherland, he co-founded Outsider Television in 1993. For six years he was an on-screen reporter on Channel 4 Dispatches before becoming a director. Films he reported included the award-winning documentary Secrets of the Gaul, which first revealed the whereabouts of the missing trawler Gaul lost with 38 men on board amid accusations that it had been used for spying.

The first film he directed was an observational documentary about the famous London toyshop Hamleys, which won the Howard Wincott Award for best film of the year 2000.

His films include three major investigations into allegations of coalition crimes in Iraq.

He has made many films for the BBC, Channel 4, ITV, Al Jazeera English and PBS. His first television documentary on Sri Lanka, Sri Lanka's Killing Fields, won the Current Affairs - International category of the Royal Television Society's Television Journalism Awards 2010–11, won two One World Media Awards and earned a BAFTA TV Award nomination.[3][4]

His most recent project is the feature documentary, No Fire Zone: The Killing Fields of Sri Lanka, which has won several awards, including The Audience Awards at the Nuremberg Film Festival and Watch Docs in Poland, as well as the Human Rights award at the Festival des Liberties in Brussels.

He and his team were also nominated for the Nobel Peace Prize in 2012.

His other recent television work includes an exposé of Khartoum's war on the Nuba people of South Kordofan for Al Jazeera.

He has won a large number of awards, including two Royal Television Society awards, two One World awards, an Indie award, an Amnesty award and in the US the Columbia DuPont Broadcast journalism award for his work in Japan after the tsunami and a Peabody Award for his work on Sri Lanka.

In 2012, he was presented with a Scottish Bafta Special Achievement Award.

In 2010 and 2011, he was named by Broadcast magazine as one of the top three television directors across all genres in the UK. ]. Sri Lanka's Killing Fields won the Current Affairs - International category of the Royal Television Society's Television Journalism Awards 2010/2011, won two One World Media Awards and earned a BAFTA TV Award nomination.

In August 2018 his documentary film was released, The Ballymurphy Incident, about the Ballymurphy massacre, a shooting by the British Army in Belfast in August 1971. For background there is a lengthy report by 'The Guardian' and he has written an article on the film

=== Major film works ===
Several of his documentaries were investigations on war crimes.

His films include:

- Japan's Killer Quake (2011) - filmed and co-directed for Nova PBS. Documentary on the aftermath of the tsunami.
- Sudan: War and Independence - presenter and director for Al Jazeera. Documentary looking at the civil war in South Kordofam Sudan.
- Whistleblower: The Secret Bank- undercover in Barclays Bank, BBC, 21 March 2007.
- Unreported World (2003) - directed and filmed, on the civil war in Uganda.
- A Day of War - covered the war in Northern Uganda for BBC. Filmed a massacre on the Sudan/Uganda border.
- Iraq's Mission Billions (2006) - on the Coalition's alleged misuse of billions of Iraqi fund during the Iraq War.
- On Whose Orders - a Panorama series investigation on the allegations of unlawful killings in Iraq by the British troops.
- Sri Lanka's Killing Fields - on the war crimes in the final stages of the Sri Lankan War in 2009.
- Sri Lanka's Killing Fields: War Crimes Unpunished - follow up to Sri Lanka's Killing Fields.
- No Fire Zone : In the Killing Fields of Sri Lanka (2013)
- The Ballymurphy Precedent (Film) Massacre at Ballymurphy (TV version) (2018)

Apart from war documentaries, he has directed documentaries on other subjects, such as on sex workers and child wedding practice among Romani people in Romania.

=== Written works ===
Macrae has written extensively for a number of journals and magazines. Articles include:

- "The oldest profession: Sex workers need a trade union and a decriminalised industry, not feminist pity" (With Ana Lopes) Friday 25 July 2003
- "Why the Humiliation of Jason Russell is Such a Tragedy" The LRA and "Invisible Children" Huffington Post 18 March 2012
- "Iraq’s Missing Billions 'Iraq was awash in cash. We played football with bricks of $100 bills'" Guardian Monday 20 March 2006
- "Killed in the name of the Lord In Uganda's bloody civil war, a children's army is responsible for some of the worst atrocities". Callum Macrae reports. The Observer, Sunday 29 February 2004
