= No Fire Zone =

- No Fire Zone Facebook Profile Picture
- Also known as: No Fire Zone: The Killing Fields of Sri Lanka
- Genre: Documentary
- Directed by: Callum Macrae
- Narrated by: Rufus Sewell
- Composer: Wayne Roberts
- Country of origin: United Kingdom

Production
- Executive producers: Chris Shaw, Dorothy Byrne, Sandra Whipam,
- Producer: Zoe Sale
- Production locations: Sri Lanka; United Kingdom
- Editor: Michael Nollet
- Running time: 49 Minutes

Original release
- Network: Channel 4

Related
- Sri Lanka's Killing Fields: War Crimes Unpunished

No Fire Zone: In the Killing Fields of Sri Lanka is an investigative documentary about the final weeks of the Sri Lankan Civil War. Released by Channel 4, the documentary covers the period from September 2008 until the end of the war in 2009 in which thousands of Tamil people were killed by shelling and extrajudicial executions by the Sri Lankan Army including Balachandran Prabhakaran, the 12-year-old son of the slain Liberation Tigers of Tamil Eelam (LTTE) Chief Velupillai Prabhakaran. The Sri Lankan army has denied the allegations in the documentary. However, on 21 October 2015 the BBC reported that Maxwell Paranagama, a government-appointed Sri Lankan judge, says allegations the army committed war crimes during the long conflict with Tamil Tiger rebels are "credible". He went on to say there was evidence to suggest that footage obtained by the No Fire Zone – showing prisoners naked, blindfolded, with arms tied and shot dead by soldiers – was genuine.

== Synopsis ==
The documentary is the product of a three-year investigation and tells the story of the final awful months of the 26-year-long Sri Lankan civil war. The story is told by the people who lived through the war – and through some of the most dramatic and disturbing video evidence ever seen. This footage includes direct evidence of war crimes, summary execution, torture and sexual violence, and was recorded by both the victims and perpetrators on mobile phones and small cameras during the final 138 days of hell which form the central narrative of the film.

No Fire Zone is directed by the Nobel Peace Prize nominee Callum Macrae, a Peabody and Colombia Dupont Broadcast Journalism Award winner and Greirson and BAFTA nominee. It has already won many awards and was a nominee for an International Emmy Award 2014.

No Fire Zone has been described as something of an international phenomenon. Not just an agenda setting investigation, but a cinematic tour de force – a stunning and disturbing film in its own right. It was described as "beautifully crafted and heart wrenching” by the Pulitzer Center for Crisis Reporting in Washington, "utterly convincing" by the Globe and Mail in Toronto – and in the UK, Empire noted: "It is vitally important that this feature reaches the widest possible audience”. One critic in Australia described it as “the most devastating film I have seen”, whilst the London Film Review says "No Fire Zone shocks on every level. It shocks, it educates, and it convinces"

It has been widely praised by personalities as disparate as the rapper M.I.A and the British Prime Minister, David Cameron, who said: ”No Fire Zone is one of the most chilling documentaries I’ve watched…”

== Film ==
In March 2013, the documentary was screened by its director, Callum Macrae, at the 22nd session of the United Nations Human Rights Council in Geneva.

The film was not released in theatres in India as Central Board of Film Certification banned it in India as it would harm the nation's friendly relations with Sri Lanka. In response to this attempt at censorship No fire Zone was released online for free in India and Malaysia as well as Sri Lanka and Nepal.

In November 2014 the Musician M.I.A described No Fire Zone as “the only film that gives me faith in journalism. It's not only the most important account of what happened to the Tamils, it's actually become part of the fabric of their history."

== Awards and Festival Screenings ==
Festival des Libertes 2013 - Winner of FIDH Best Film Award.
CPH:DOX Copenhagen 2013 - FACT Award Jury Special Mention
Nuremberg Film Festival 2013 - Winner of Audience Award
Film South Asia 2013 - Special Jury Mention.
WatchDocs Poland 2014 - Winner of Audience Award
One World Film Festival Prague 2014 - Winner Václav Havel Jury Special Mention
Docudays UA - Kyiv 2014 - Winner of Jury Special Mention.
Festival internacional de Cine y Video de Derochos Humanos Buenos Aires 2013 - Winner Jury Special Mention.
Oslo International film festival 2013.
Movies That Matter 2013
FIFDH Geneva 2013
Tricontinental Human Right Film Festival 2013.
Freedom Film Festival Malaysia 2013
Addis International film Festival 2013.
Sheffield Documentary Festival 2013
No Fire Zone (TV version) was nominated for Best Documentary at the 2014 International Emmy Awards and was awarded the Britdoc Impact Award as well as being shortlisted for a Grierson award

== Controversy ==
Despite the painstaking checking and independent verification of the footage contained within the film, the Sri Lankan government continue to maintain that the footage contained within the film is faked. However, as more and more evidence continues to emerge this position becomes ever more untenable.

In March 2014 the United Nations Commission on Human Rights voted to establish an independent international inquiry into the events covered in the film and subsequent and ongoing human rights abuses in Sri Lanka. Despite the international mandate for this inquiry the government of Sri Lanka has refused to cooperate and has denied the UNCHR investigators entry to Sri Lanka.

The Government of Sri Lanka have also been active in trying to prevent the film being seen. Just prior to No Fire Zone being screened at the Film South Asia festival in Nepal, the Nepalese government were pressurised by the Government of Sri Lanka into trying to have the advertised screening stopped. The organisers of the festival ignored the ban and held two screenings rather than the single advertised screening.

Again in Malaysia, despite the film having already been screened at the Malaysian parliament, a private human rights organisation screening of the film in Kuala Lumpur was raided and the organisers arrested.

Just prior to the Commonwealth Heads of Government meeting held in Colombo in November 2013, a book entitled Corrupted Journalism appeared. The book, published and written by a group called "Engage Sri Lanka", is believed to be an attempt by the Sri Lankan government to propagate the pro-government stance that the allegations made in the film and the previous two documentaries shown on UK television by Channel 4 are false. The book was even included in the delegate pack at the conference until removed at the insistence of the Commonwealth Secretariat. Links to the publication also appeared on the Home pages of Sri Lankan Embassy websites around the world.

In response to the allegations made within this book Channel 4 published a detailed rebuttal written by the film's director Callum Macrae entitled The Uncorrupted Truth

The documentary was banned in India from theatrical release as it would damage ties with Sri Lanka.

== Updated Versions ==
In November 2014 the producers released an updated version of the film containing new evidence, including footage showing the capture, alive, of the LTTE TV presenter Isaipriya. Previously the Sri Lankan government had claimed she had died in battle. This update also included an interview with one of the Tamil doctors who had been trapped in the No Fire Zone. During the war the doctors told the world of the terrible conditions in the no Fire Zone, but after the war they were arrested and he held by the Sri Lankan Criminal Investigation Department. While in captivity they were forced to appear at a stage managed government press conference and deny everything they said from the war zone. In this interview - a longer version of which appeared on Channel 4 news in the UK - the most senior of the doctors revealed that he and the other doctors had been forced by Sri Lankan military intelligence to change their story - and confirmed that what they had said from the war zone was indeed accurate.

In January 2015 it was announced that the producers were working on a Sinhala language version of the film to be released later that month. Also in January 2015, following the defeat of President Rajapaksa in Sri Lanka's presidential election, the film was re-released with a further update in time for a US campus tour organized by the Pulitzer Center on Crisis Reporting starting in February 2015.

== Death threats to Callum Macrae ==
In 2013, Alistair Burt, the minister in charge of Sri Lanka, said that the British government expected the Sri Lankan government to "guarantee full and unrestricted access for international press covering Chogm" when Cameron announced he would be attending the Commonwealth Heads of Government Meeting in Sri Lanka. However, Bandula Jayasekara, a top Sri Lankan diplomat stationed in Australia and a former key media adviser to Rajapaksa, tweeted a message to Callum Macrae while he was there to promote the No Fire Zone. Callum Macrae was accused of being "hired by [Tiger] terrorists as a full time propagandist for the bloodthirsty terror group overseas" and Bandula Jayasakara threatened to "make sure you don't get a visa".

Additionally, Callum Macrae got many online death threats after telling a Sri Lankan publication that he planned to travel there to cover Chogm. "You are welcome to come to Sri Lanka", one said, "only to go back in a coffin". Another urged,

"Callum Macrae, please do not travel to Sri Lanka. In a white vehicle, you will be kidnapped and taken to see Lasantha Wikremasinghe [sic]."
