= Tamil genocide =

Characterization of actions against Tamils in Sri Lanka as genocide

- Part of the Sri Lankan civil war
- Clockwise from top: Child victim by indiscriminate shelling, malnourished baby in camps, civilian dead bodies and damaged makeshift hospital in No-Fire Zone, Mullivaikkal, Tamil civilians being displaced in 2008, injured child by indiscriminate shelling.
- Location: Sri Lanka
- Date: 1956–2009 (Ongoing systemic racism)
- Target: Sri Lankan Tamils
- Attack type: Genocide, rape, massacre, collective punishment, mass arrest, bombardment, targeted killings, starvation, torture.
- Deaths: 1956–2009: 154,022 to 253,818 Tamil civilians killed: 1956–2001: 79,155 Tamil civilians killed: 54,044 killed + 25,266 disappeared (Tamil Centre for Human Rights, 2004); 2002–2008 Dec: 4,867 Tamil civilians killed: 3,545 killed, 1,322 disappeared (Pro-rebel NESOHR); 2009 Jan–May: 169,796 Tamil civilians killed (ITJP, 2021); 2009 Jan–May: Tamil civilians killed & unaccounted: 40,000 to 70,000 (UN)
- Injuries: 1956–2004: 61,132 Tamil civilians (Tamil Centre for Human Rights)
- Victims: 1956–2004: Tamil civilians (Tamil Centre for Human Rights): Raped: 12,437 women; Arrest/Torture: 112,246; Displaced: 2,390,809
- Perpetrators: Government of Sri Lanka: Sri Lanka Armed Forces; Sri Lanka Police; Sinhalese mobs; (India) Indian Peace Keeping Force
- Defenders: Sri Lanka Monitoring Mission; Liberation Tigers of Tamil Eelam
- Motive: Anti-Tamil sentiment, Sinhalese Buddhist nationalism, racism, Sinhalisation

The Tamil genocide refers to the framing of various systematic acts of physical violence and cultural destruction committed against the Tamil population in Sri Lanka during the Sinhala–Tamil ethnic conflict beginning in 1956, particularly during the Sri Lankan civil war as acts of genocide. Various commenters, including the Permanent Peoples' Tribunal, have accused the Sri Lankan government of responsibility for and complicity in a genocide of Tamils, and point to state-sponsored settler colonialism, state-backed pogroms, and mass killings, enforced disappearances and sexual violence by the security forces as examples of genocidal acts. The Sri Lankan government has rejected the charges of genocide.

== History ==
=== Pogroms ===
There has been a series of virulent anti-Tamil pogroms in Sri Lanka, the most infamous of which is the 1983 Black July pogrom in which over 3,000 Tamils were killed. The International Commission of Jurists described the violence of the 1983 Black July pogrom as having "amounted to acts of genocide" in a report published in December 1983. A number of other scholars have also described the pogrom as genocidal. Although initially orchestrated by members of the ruling UNP, the pogrom soon escalated into mass violence with significant public participation. (Note: George Immerwahr, a United Nations civil servant and U.S. citizen, revealed the following regarding the government's responsibility for the pogrom: "the most shattering report came from a [Sinhalese] friend who was a civil servant; he told me that he had himself helped plan the riots at the orders of his superiors. When I heard him say this, I was so shocked I told him I simply couldn't believe him, but he insisted he was telling the truth, and in fact he justified the government's decision to stage the riots. When I heard this, I telephoned an official in our own State Department, and while he declined to discuss the matter, I got the impression that he already knew from our Embassy in Colombo what I was telling him.") Till date no one has been held accountable for any of the crimes committed during the pogrom.

=== Massacres and killings ===
Over 100 massacres of Tamil civilians were committed by the Sri Lankan security forces throughout the civil war, resulting in the deaths and injuries of tens of thousands. It was estimated that by 1986, the security forces "had been killing an average of 233 Tamil civilians every month or about 7 a day". During a 1990 reprisal against the Tamil population of the eastern province, 3,000 Tamil civilians were massacred and hundreds of Tamil males were rounded up and burned alive over a span of only a few weeks in just two districts. In December 1984, over 1200 Tamil civilians were massacred by the military in just one month. In 1994 the genocide scholar Israel Charny used the concept of "genocidal massacre" to describe the Sri Lankan government's round up and execution of some 5,000 Tamil civilians.

=== Enforced disappearances ===
Within months of the Sri Lanka military returning to the eastern province in June 1990 following the resumption of war, thousands of Tamils disappeared in the custody of the security forces. Between 1995 and 1996, over 600 Tamils disappeared in Jaffna, hundreds of whom were said to have been buried by the Sri Lankan Army in mass graves in Chemmani. Sri Lanka became the country with the highest number of disappearances reported to the UN Working Group on Enforced and Involuntary Disappearances between 1996 and 1997. In 2008, Human Rights Watch accused the Sri Lankan government of being responsible for "widespread abductions and disappearances" of hundreds of Tamils since the war resumed in 2006, with most feared dead. Since 2006, Sri Lanka once again became the country with the highest number of disappearances reported to the UN Working Group. A report by the Human Rights Data Analysis Group and the International Truth and Justice Project found that at the end of the war between 17 and 19 May 2009, an estimated 503 Tamils, including at least 29 children, were subjected to enforced disappearance after surrendering to the Sri Lankan Army around Vadduvakal Bridge in Mullaitivu. The report stated that they represented "the largest number of disappearances in one place and time in the country's history."

After visiting Sri Lanka in 2013, Navi Pillay, then UN High Commissioner for Human Rights, highlighted the plight of Tamil families with missing persons by stating she had "never experienced so many people weeping and crying," and "never seen this level of uncontrollable grief". In 2020, then Sri Lankan President Gotabaya Rajapaksa stated that more than 20,000 people who disappeared during the war were dead.

The Permanent Peoples' Tribunal included the abductions and enforced disappearances of displaced Tamils as an example of the state's calculated policy to "physically eliminate Eelam Tamils on the basis of their group identity." Bruce Fein, an American lawyer who specializes in international law, described the frequent disappearances of Tamils as among the "exemplary genocidal events". Lutz Oette, an international law specialist, examined the reported cases of enforced disappearances of thousands of Tamils between 1984 and 1997 and stated that they fell within the definition of genocidal acts.

== Mullivaikkal massacre ==
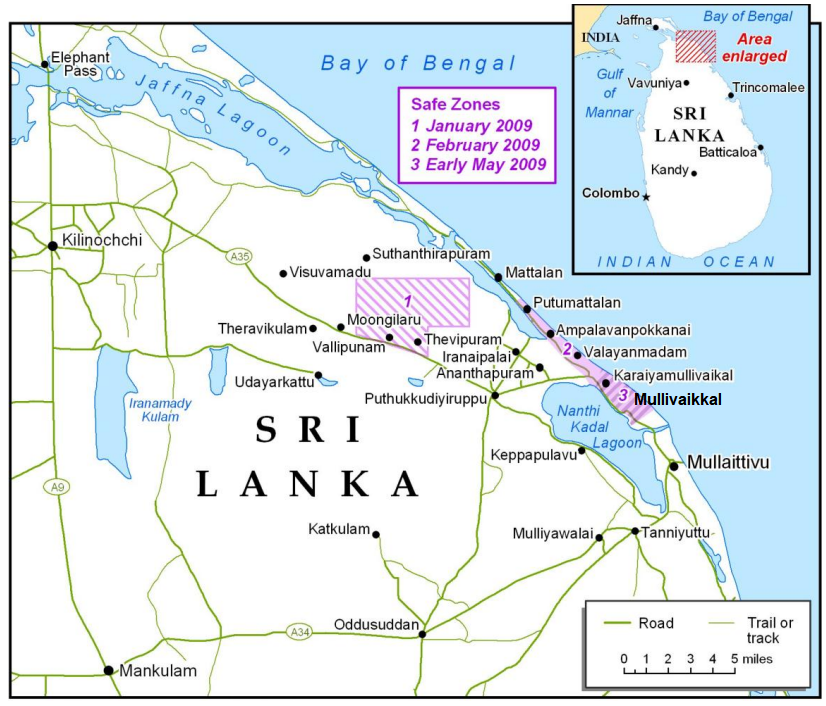
No-Fire Zones (NFZs) in 2009, which became primary sites of civilian massacres by Sri Lanka Armed Forces

Mullivaikkal massacre was the mass killing of tens of thousands of Tamil civilians during the final months of the Sri Lankan civil war ending in May 2009 in a tiny strip of land called Mullivaikkal on the northeast coast of the island, which is part of a larger region known as the Vanni. The Sri Lankan government designated several No Fire Zones (NFZs) in Mullivaikkal where it had encouraged civilians to concentrate. It then proceeded to shell using heavy weapons three consecutive NFZs killing large numbers of civilians despite having foreknowledge of the impact through information provided by its UAVs, as well as by the UN and the ICRC. According to the UN, an estimated 40,000 Tamil civilians were killed, with the majority of casualties being the result of indiscriminate and widespread shelling by the government forces. UN staff had been quoted as saying that by May 2009, up to 1,000 Tamil civilians were being killed each day by the military. In a later internal review, the UN stated that there was credible information that over 70,000 people are unaccounted for. The International Truth and Justice Project (ITJP) estimated that up to 169,796 Tamil civilians could have been killed in the final phase of the war. In February 2009, the Sri Lankan Defence Secretary Gotabaya Rajapaksa, brother of President Mahinda Rajapaksa, justified killing Tamil civilians by stating that hospitals operating outside the designated NFZs were legitimate targets; civilians were all "LTTE sympathizers"; and that distinction could not be made between combatants and civilians.

In 2014, an international team of investigators for the International Crimes Evidence Project (ICEP) and in 2015 the Report of the OHCHR Investigation on Sri Lanka (OISL) both found that large numbers of civilians, mostly women and children, queuing at food distribution centers were deliberately killed by government shelling despite there being no LTTE activity and the government having knowledge of the time and location of the distributions. ICEP found reasonable grounds to believe the shelling of NFZs amounted to crimes against humanity: murder, extermination, persecution and other inhumane acts. The government was also accused of denying humanitarian assistance by deliberately understating the number of civilians in the conflict zone which resulted in the shortage of food and civilians being starved to death. During the final days of the war, the Sri Lankan Army also engaged in indiscriminate executions of Tamils, civilians as well as fighters who surrendered waving a white flag. Indiscriminate massacres of surrendering civilians, including children, were also carried out at the end of the war on 18 May 2009.

A military whistleblower accused government forces of a subsequent cover-up with bodies being buried in mass graves and chemicals being used to dissolve skeletons. Commenting on the systematic destruction of mass burial sites by the government, William Schabas, a professor of international law, stated that "when people destroy evidence it's because they know they've done something wrong".

A panel of genocide scholars of the Permanent Peoples' Tribunal described the mass killing in the final stages of the war as the "climax" of the genocidal process. Spanish lawyer Carlos Castresana Fernandez, who coordinated a war crimes lawsuit by human rights groups against former Sri Lankan general Jagath Jayasuriya for overseeing abuses in the last phase of the war, described the crimes as "one genocide that has been forgotten". Francis Boyle, an international lawyer who helped file the Bosnian genocide case, cited the World Court's 2007 Bosnian Judgment to argue that the "extermination" of Tamil civilians in the Vanni in 2009 numbering many times that of the Srebrenica massacre "also constituted genocide". Drawing on the parallels between the Srebrenica and the Vanni cases, human rights lawyer Anji Manivannan argued that the Sri Lankan government leaders and military commanders possessed specific intent of genocide in targeting a substantial part of the Tamil population of the Vanni in 2009 for destruction, namely, its numeric size, significance and the presence of the group's leadership; and committed three acts of genocide, namely, killing by intentional shelling of the UN hub, hospitals and food distribution lines; "causing serious bodily or mental harm" by maiming around 30,000 civilians and using sexual violence against hundreds of women and girls; and "deliberately inflicting conditions of life to bring about the group's physical destruction" by denying humanitarian aid.

Professor Jude Lal Fernando situated the genocidal intent and actions of the Sri Lankan state during the Mullivaikkal massacre within the historical context of a majoritarian nation-building process, and argued that the Sri Lankan state is motivated by Sinhalese Buddhist nationalism which underpinned its intent to destroy the Tamil ethnic group in part. Fernando cited statements from Sri Lankan military and political leaders who claimed the island as a Sinhalese country and denied the civilian status of Tamil civilians trapped in the war zone by describing them as "just the relatives of the Terrorists" as reflecting the genocidal intent of the state.

Tamil human rights group PEARL published a report in September 2024 arguing that there was a sufficient legal basis to describe the massacre as a genocide. It stated that the Sri Lankan government was guilty of the first three acts of genocide as listed in the Genocide Convention; and that they were committed with genocidal intent to destroy in part the Tamil people. It argued that the targeted part, Tamils of the Vanni, constituted a "substantial part" of the whole Tamil population in Sri Lanka; and based on the UN and ITJP figures, it estimated that 1.3 and 5.5 percent, respectively, of the whole Tamil population (incl. Indian Tamils) in Sri Lanka and 13 and 57 percent, respectively, of the whole Tamil population of the Vanni itself were killed in the massacre. Following the precedent set by ICTR, ICTY and UN Fact-Finding Mission on Myanmar, it argued that genocidal intent can be inferred from circumstantial evidence, such as disproportionate and systematic use of force against Tamils in the Vanni and statements of Defence Secretary conflating civilians with combatants.

Research scholar Karthick Ram Manoharan argued that the Sri Lankan state adopted genocide as a counterinsurgency strategy against the Tamil population and its genocidal intentions were rooted in Sinhalese nationalism that claims the entire island as an exclusive Sinhalese property and seeks to assimilate Tamils through "Sinhalization". Former UN staffer Benjamin Dix, who had worked in the Vanni between 2004 and 2008, stated it was a "very fair" assessment that the Sri Lankan Army committed genocide, describing the final offensive as "destruction of the Tamil community". Several other authors and journalists have also described the massacre as a genocide.

=== Eyewitness accounts ===
On 18 May 2010, Channel 4 News broadcast interviews with two Sri Lankan soldiers who claimed that they had been given orders from "the top" to summarily execute all ethnic Tamils, civilians as well as fighters. A senior commander claimed "the order would have been to kill everybody and finish them off...It is clear that such orders were...from the top". Sri Lankan Defence Secretary Gotabaya Rajapaksa was said to have given direct orders to army commanders at the battle front. The commander also claimed that Velupillai Prabhakaran's 12-year-old son Balachandran was interrogated by the military before being shot dead. A front line soldier said, "our commander ordered us to kill everyone. We killed everyone". The soldier claimed that the Tamils were tortured before being executed. Numerous photos taken by Sri Lankan soldiers showing dead bodies and Tamil prisoners were also shown in the broadcast.

One of the soldiers who served in the 58 Division of the Sri Lankan Army tearfully recounted the heinous crimes committed by fellow soldiers in 2009:

"They shoot people at random, stab people, rape them, cut their tongues out, cut women's breasts off. I have witnessed all this with my own eyes.

I saw a lot of small children, who were so innocent, getting killed in large numbers. A large number of elders were also killed.

If they wanted to rape a Tamil girl, they could just beat her and do it. If her parents tried to stop them, they could beat them or kill them. It was their empire.

I saw the naked dead bodies of women without heads and other parts of their bodies. I saw a mother and child dead and the child's body was without its head."

He further described the government's attempts to cover up:

"in Puthumathalan alone, over 1500 civilians were killed. But they couldn't bury all of them. What they did was, they bought a bulldozer, they spread the dead bodies out and put sand on top of them, making it look like a bund...I saw the same happen to more than 50,000 people like that."

An army insider also witnessed indiscriminate massacres on 18 May 2009, and stated the following:

"I saw this shooting of surrenderees take place a number of times. A number of groups, some 50, some 75, some more than 25 would come forward and they would all be killed. That included children, small children, women and old people... This was widespread killing. If journalists were around then the civilians were allowed to surrender, but when the journalists were not around the orders were to kill everyone."

Another retired soldier who served on the front lines told The New York Times that they should "beg for forgiveness" for what they had done during the final offensive, recounting that they were "encouraged to be merciless" and they "went mad".

=== UN response ===
In a 2012 internal review of its conduct during the last stages of the Sri Lankan civil war, the UN found that various UN agencies had failed to protect Tamil civilians at every level, particularly by withdrawing its staff from the war zone and by withholding evidence of widespread government shelling. Vijay Nambiar, then chief of staff under UN Secretary-General, implored Navi Pillay (High Commissioner for Human Rights) to dilute her statement on potential war crimes by the government, complaining that it put the LTTE and the government "on the same footing". Commenting on Nambiar's statement that UN's role should be "compatible with the government," Francis Boyle, professor of international law, denounced the UN and its top officials as aiding and abetting Tamil genocide. Vijay Nambiar's own brother Satish Nambiar was a consultant to the Sri Lankan government and had praised the Sri Lanka Army and its conduct of the war, in spite of all the civilians killed. Louise Arbour, the former UN High Commissioner for Human Rights, described the UN's conduct as having "verged on complicity". The UN's response was constrained by some of its powerful veto-wielding members such as China and Russia who shielded the Sri Lankan government. In 2016 then UN Secretary-General Ban Ki-moon acknowledged UN's failures in Sri Lanka which he named along with Rwanda and Srebrenica as examples of its "never again" repeating itself.

== Sexual violence ==
Sexual violence against Tamils in Sri Lanka has occurred repeatedly during the island's long ethnic conflict. The first instances of rape of Tamil women by Sinhalese mobs were documented during the 1958 anti-Tamil pogrom. This continued in the 1960s with the deployment of the Sri Lankan Army in Jaffna, who were reported to have molested and occasionally raped Tamil women. Further rapes of Tamils were carried out by Sinhalese mobs during the 1977, 1981 and 1983 anti-Tamil pogroms.

There has been widespread and systematic sexual violence against the Tamil population by the Sinhalese-dominated Sri Lankan security forces with the approval of the highest levels of the government both during and after the war. The victims included both females and males, civilians and LTTE suspects, of all age groups. The methods involved sexual humiliation, forced nudity, sexual assault, sexual torture, sexual mutilation, vaginal and anal rape, gang rape, forced prostitution, sexual slavery, forced abortion, forced pregnancy and forced contraception. The extent of sexual violence reached unprecedented levels during the last stages of the war: A large number of Tamil women who crossed over to the government-controlled areas were sexually assaulted, causing many to flee back to the war zone. The sexual abuse is often accompanied by racist verbal abuse, such as being insulted as "Tamil dog" and "Tamil...slave". One female victim was told by her military rapists that they won the war and they wanted Tamil women to bear Sinhalese children; and another male victim was told he was "a Tamil dog and should not have any future generations" while being assaulted on his genitals. Tamil survivors related that the sexual violence inflicted in detention left them with "the most severe and persistent psychological damage". Piers Pigou, a human rights investigator with 40 years experience of interviewing torture survivors, described the levels of sexual abuse perpetrated against Tamils by the Sri Lankan authorities as "the most egregious and perverted" that he had ever seen.

A panel of scholars of the Permanent Peoples' Tribunal found the extensive and prolonged acts of sexual violence committed against the Tamil population with state impunity to be "a clear case of genocide". Citing the ICTR judgement, the Tamil human rights group PEARL reported that the rapes in the final phase of the war and the forced abortions, forced pregnancies and forced contraception may or would constitute acts of genocide by preventing Tamil births. Altunjan (2021) described the forced contraception on Tamil women as occurring in a "genocidal context". The director of UK-based Widows for Peace through Democracy described the organized and state-sanctioned rapes as "a form of genocide of the Tamil people."

== Cultural destruction ==
The burning of the Jaffna Public library in 1981 by an organised Sinhalese mob has been described by Damien Short as a 'classic genocidal tactic', where the cultural roots of the Tamils was being attacked, with old and irreplaceable documents being destroyed. In the context of discussing genocide, Damien Kingsbury states that there is little doubt that the Sri Lankan government has "engaged in the cultural destruction of the Tamil people", from the burning of the library, to the wholesale displacement of Tamils from their legally held lands.

=== Land grabbing and colonization ===
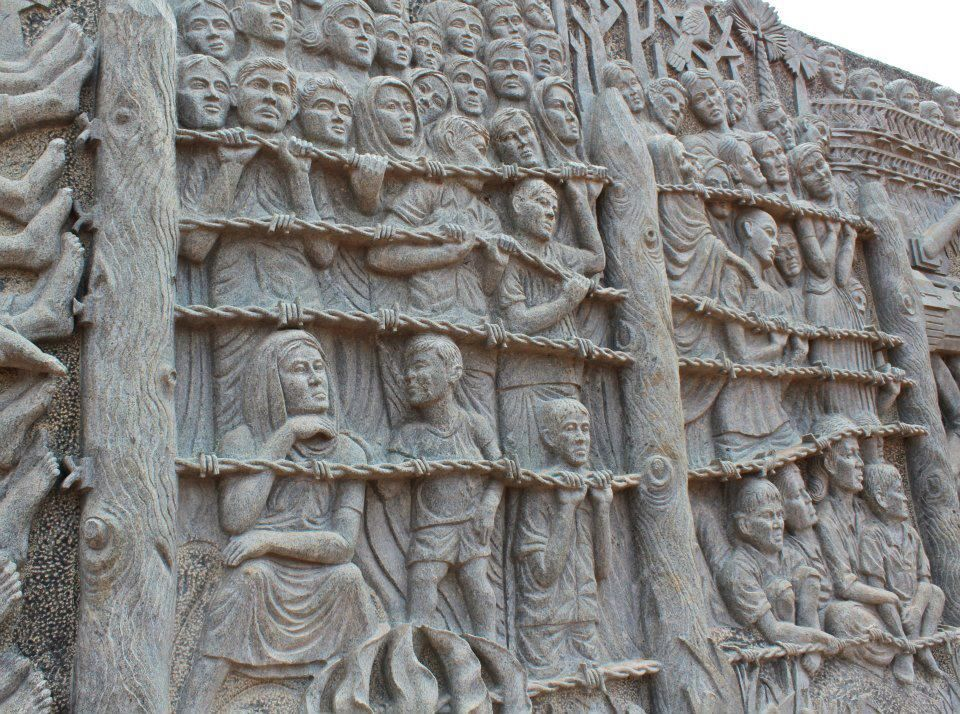
Depiction of Tamil civilians being held in Sri Lankan IDP concentration camps.

The Sri Lankan military's control and domination of the Tamil population, along with systematic land grabs have been described by Damien Short as part of a "genocidal process that is destroying the land-based political, economic, social, cultural, and environmental foundations" of the Tamil community. Sinhala Buddhist nationalists within the Sri Lankan government, Buddhist clergy and Mahaweli department have deliberately targeted the Tamil majority northeast for state sponsored Sinhala colonisation, with the explicit intention to take the land into "Sinhala hands" away from the Tamils, and to disrupt the Tamil-speaking continuity between the north and east. This resulted in a significant demographic shift, with the resettled farmers contributing to an increase in the Sinhalese population in the northeast dry zone, thus promoting Sinhala-Buddhist hegemony in the area. Sinhalese settlers were provided with preferential access to land by the state in these regions, whilst the local Tamil speaking people were excluded from this privilege, making them minorities in their own lands.

Whilst empowering Sinhalese settlers, the scheme also served as a means to marginalize, exclude, and harm Tamil speaking minorities, treating them as the 'other'. It has been perhaps the most immediate cause of inter-communal violence, with violent displacement of Tamil civilians to make way for Sinhalese settlers occurring several times. The University Teachers for Human Rights has described this as ethnic cleansing of Tamils occurring with the support of the government since the 1956 Gal Oya riots. In 1985, a Sri Lankan government appointed study group recommended using Sinhala colonisation to break the link between the Tamil majority regions of the north and east. President J. R. Jayewardene publicly announced that his government planned to settle Sinhalese in the predominantly Tamil Northern Province over the next 2 years in order to create a 75% Sinhalese majority there (to reflect the overall nationwide proportion of Sinhalese to Tamils on the island). Following the end of war in 2009, Sinhalese officials and settlers in Weli Oya have expressed their desire to take more land further north in order to "make the Sinhala man the most present in all parts of the country".

== Recognition of genocide ==
=== Permanent Peoples' Tribunal ===
Between 7–10 December 2013, the Rome-based Permanent Peoples' Tribunal held a Tribunal on Sri Lanka in Bremen, Germany to investigate accusations that the Sri Lankan government committed genocide against the Tamil people. The panel of 11 judges, which included experts in genocide studies such as Daniel Feierstein, a professor in the faculty of Genocide at University of Buenos Aires, past UN officials, human rights activists and experts in international law, unanimously found Sri Lanka guilty of the crime of genocide.

The Tribunal found that the evidence conclusively demonstrated, beyond any reasonable doubt, that the Government of Sri Lanka committed the following genocidal acts:

(a) Killing members of the group, which includes massacres, indiscriminate shelling, the strategy of herding civilians into so-called "No Fire Zones" for the purpose of mass killings, and targeted assassinations of prominent Tamil civil leaders who could expose the Sri Lankan genocide to the world.

(b) Inflicting serious bodily or mental harm on members of the group, including acts of torture, inhumane or degrading treatment, sexual violence such as rape, interrogations combined with beatings, threats of death, and harm that damages health or causes disfigurement or injury.

(c) Deliberately imposing conditions of life intended to bring about the group's physical destruction in whole or in part, including the expulsion of victims from their homes, seizure of private lands, and the declaration of vast areas as military High Security Zones (HSZ) to facilitate the military acquisition of Tamil land.

=== Political recognition ===
==== India ====
On 14 August 1983, Indian Prime Minister Indira Gandhi declared the Black July pogrom to be a genocide against the Tamil people.

==== Sri Lanka ====
On 12 April 2015, the Northern Provincial Council of Sri Lanka passed a resolution calling the UN to investigate the Tamil genocide and refer its findings to the International Criminal Court (ICC), stating that the Tamils had no faith in the domestic commission.

==== Spain ====
On 25 January 2019, a resolution passed by the Municipal Council of the City of Barcelona called for an international investigation into "the genocide perpetrated by the government of Sri Lanka".

==== Italy ====
On 24 September 2021, Palermo City Council signed a Memorandum of understanding with the Tamil community in Italy, with the city agreeing to recognize Tamil genocide and to promote Tamil Genocide Education Week in May each year.

==== Canada ====
In 2022, the Parliament of Canada unanimously adopted a motion to make May 18 as the Tamil Genocide Remembrance Day. To mark the first Tamil Genocide Remembrance Day on 18 May 2023, Canadian Prime Minister Justin Trudeau issued the following statement:

"The stories of Tamil-Canadians affected by the conflict – including many I have met over the years in communities across the country – serve as an enduring reminder that human rights, peace, and democracy cannot be taken for granted. That's why Parliament last year unanimously adopted the motion to make May 18 Tamil Genocide Remembrance Day. Canada will not stop advocating for the rights of the victims and survivors of this conflict, as well as for all in Sri Lanka who continue to face hardship."

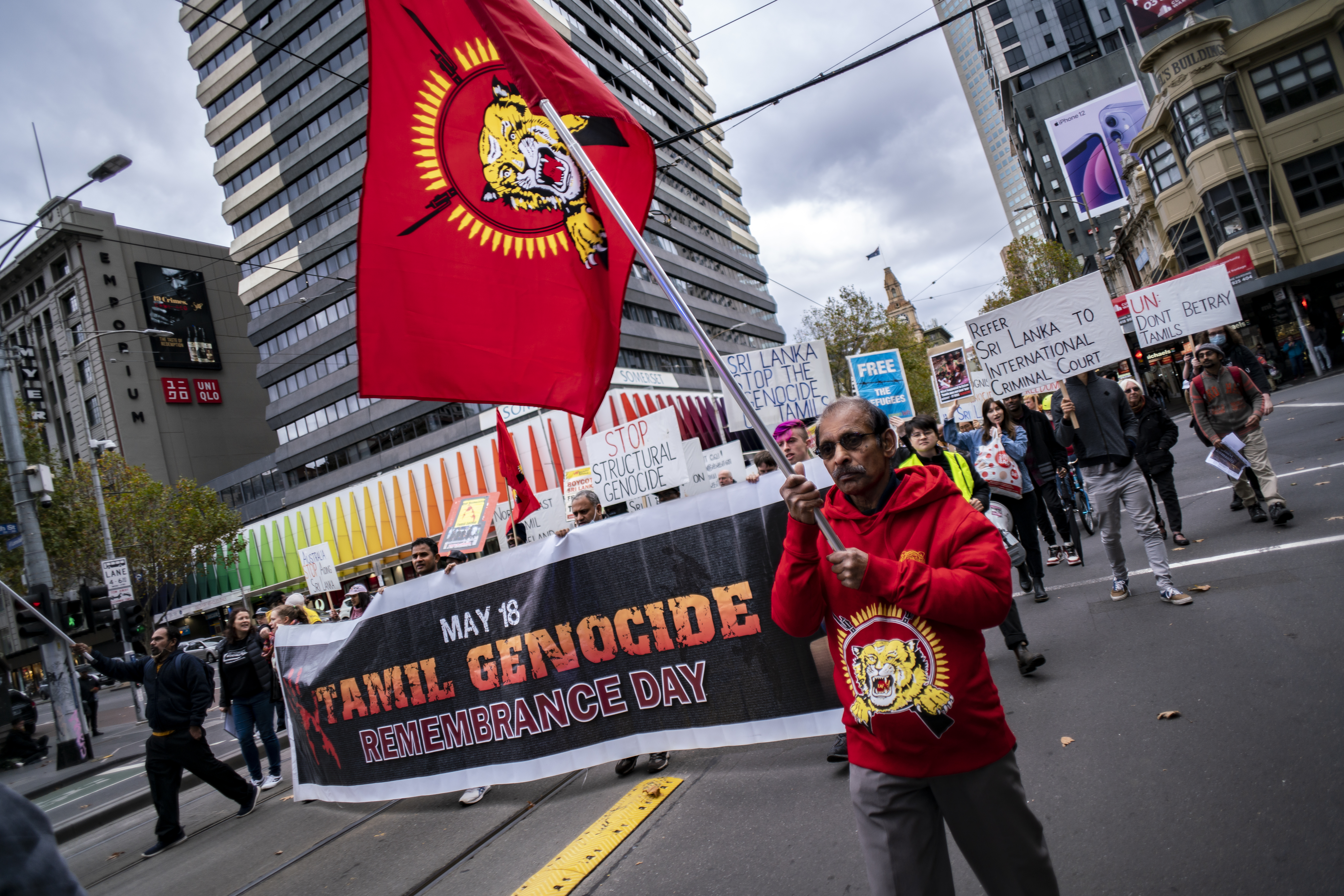
A rally commemorating the Tamil Genocide in Melbourne, Australia

However, in an April 2023 interview with Bob Rae, the Permanent Representative of Canada to the United Nations, Garnett Genuis clarified that a recognition of genocide by the House of Commons does not necessarily reflect an official position of the government of Canada. Rae said that he was not aware of the government of Canada recognizing the Tamil genocide. On 16 June 2023, the Daily Mirror claimed that the Canadian foreign ministry had privately told the Sri Lankan government that Canada "had not made any finding that genocide had taken place in Sri Lanka." On 21 June 2023, The Island reported that the Canadian High Commission in Sri Lanka confirmed that Prime Minister Trudeau's statement marking the first Tamil Genocide Remembrance Day reflected Canada's stance.

In response to Trudeau's statement, Sri Lanka stated: "Sri Lanka rejects the reference to Tamil Genocide Remembrance Day by the Canadian Prime Minister and that it is a distorted narrative of the past conflict in Sri Lanka is aimed solely at achieving local vote-bank electoral gains, and is not conducive to broader goals of communal harmony."

==== United States ====
Several U.S. legislators such as Wiley Nickel and Deborah Ross also recognize the Tamil Genocide Remembrance Day.

==== United Kingdom ====
Whilst the British government hasn't officially recognized the claim of genocide, British Tamil community regularly lobby for the recognition, submitting a petition to then Prime Minister Keir Starmer as recently as 2025. In Scotland Scottish National Party politician Bill Kidd filed the motion in 2025 titled Recognition of the Tamil Genocide and Support for Self-determination, calling for formal recognition as well as for Tamil self-determination. Whilst the motion lapsed, speaking to the Tamil Guardian a year later Kidd expressed his intention to build support for recognition, drawing parallels with Palestine and Gaza, noting the outpouring of support in Scotland.

== Commemoration ==
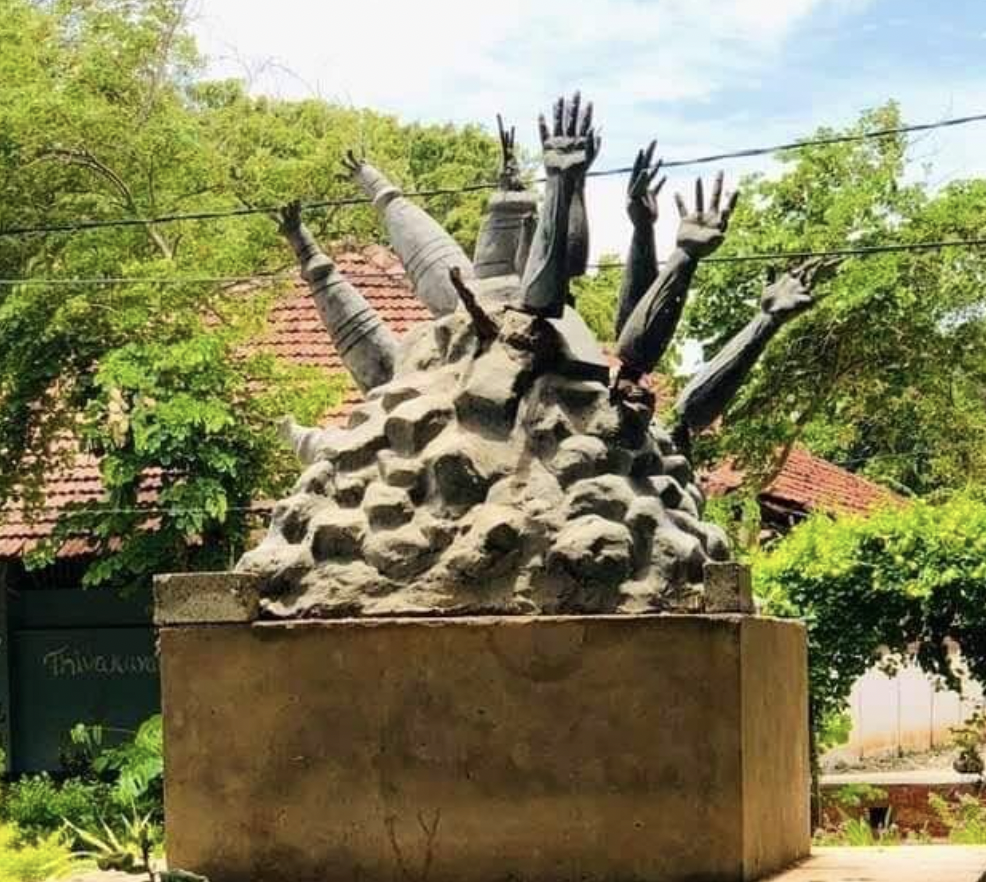
The Mullivaikkal memorial in Jaffna prior to destruction.

Mullivaikkal Remembrance Day is a remembrance day observed on each 18 May by Tamil people to commemorate the Tamil victims of the Mullivaikkal massacre in the last stages of the Sri Lankan civil war. Its date coincides with the ending of the Sri Lankan civil war on 18 May 2009 and is named after Mullivaikkal, a village on the northeast coast of Sri Lanka where the massacres happened.

=== Sri Lanka ===
At the University of Jaffna in northern Sri Lanka, a monument was constructed in 2019 to commemorate the Tamil victims of the Mullivaikkal massacre. However, the monument was destroyed by the Sri Lankan authorities on 8 January 2021. The destruction of the monument sparked protests and outcry both locally and internationally. On 23 April 2021, a replacement monument was unveiled.

=== India ===
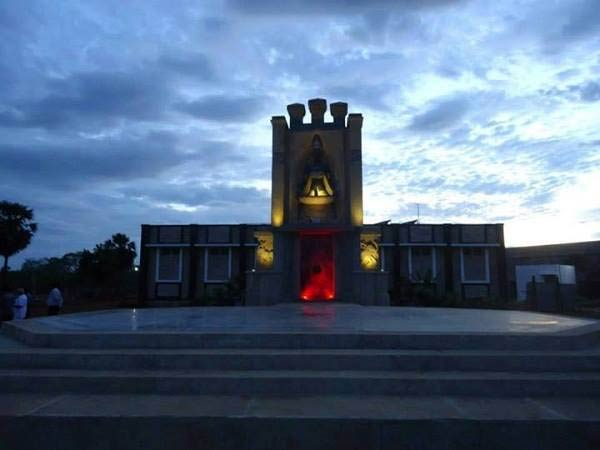
Illuminated sculpture of Tamil Paavai (Tamil Goddess/Tamil Mother), at the entrance of Mullivaikal Muttram.

The Mullivaikkal Memorial in the Thanjavur District of Tamil Nadu, India is a memorial dedicated to the Tamils massacred in Sri Lanka. On 6 November 2013, the inauguration of the Mullivaikal Memorial took place. The memorial was founded by Pazha Nedumaran and the World Tamil Confederation Trust.

=== Mauritius ===
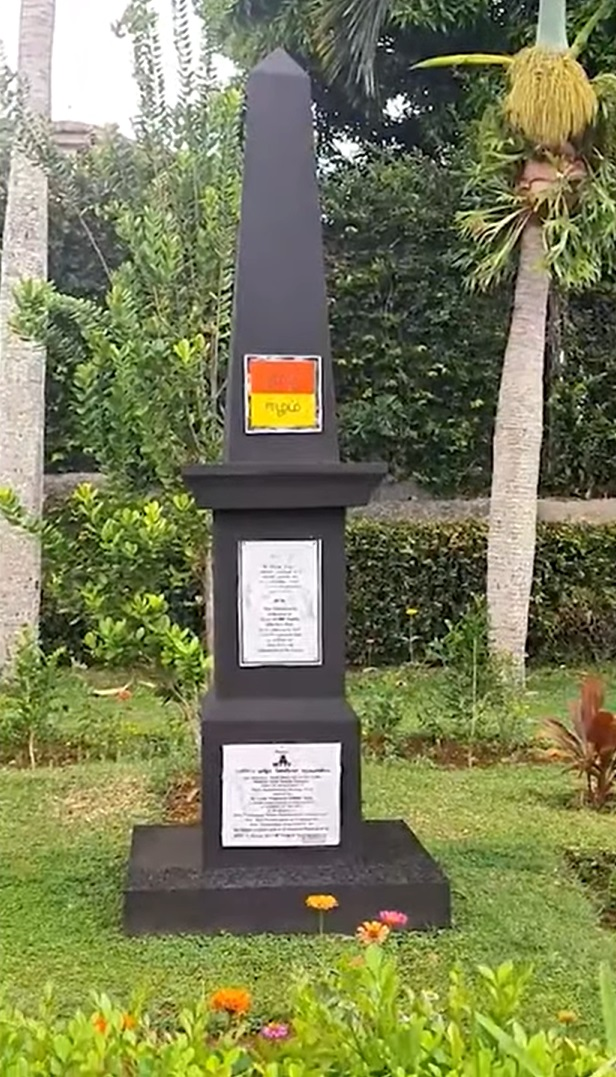
Memorial Pillar at Mauritius

In honor of the dead Tamil civilians and LTTE soldiers, the mayor of Beau Bassin Rose Hill, Louis Andre Toussaint, in Mauritius, constructed a pillar in response to the Mauritius Tamil Temple Federation's (MTTF) requests. The memorial's epitaph states:

"THIS MEMORIAL IS DEDICATED TO THOSE 146,679 TAMILS WHO LOST THEIR LIVES INNOCENTLY AND 40,000 REPORTED LOST IN DEFENCE OF THEIR BELOVED MOTHERLAND IN SRI LANKA"

This memorial is located within the Beau Bassin Rose Hill Municipal Council's grounds, a short distance from the mayor's office.

=== Canada ===
In January 2021, Canadian Mayor Patrick Brown promised to build a monument commemorating the victims of Tamil genocide after the Mullivaikkal memorial in Sri Lanka was torn down by the authorities. The Brampton City Council unanimously voted for the proposal. Brown stated: "Where they tear down a statue and they tear down history in Sri Lanka that we would do the opposite in Canada. That we would build a monument to remember the victims, to remember the genocide". In February 2024, the Brampton City Council approved the final design for the Tamil Genocide Memorial which was built in Chinguacousy Park by 2025. The monument was strongly opposed by the Sri Lankan government which summoned the Canadian High Commissioner in Colombo to convey its disapproval. A group of Sinhalese Canadians also staged a protest at the construction site where a foundation stone of the monument was being laid.

==== Tamil Genocide Education Week ====
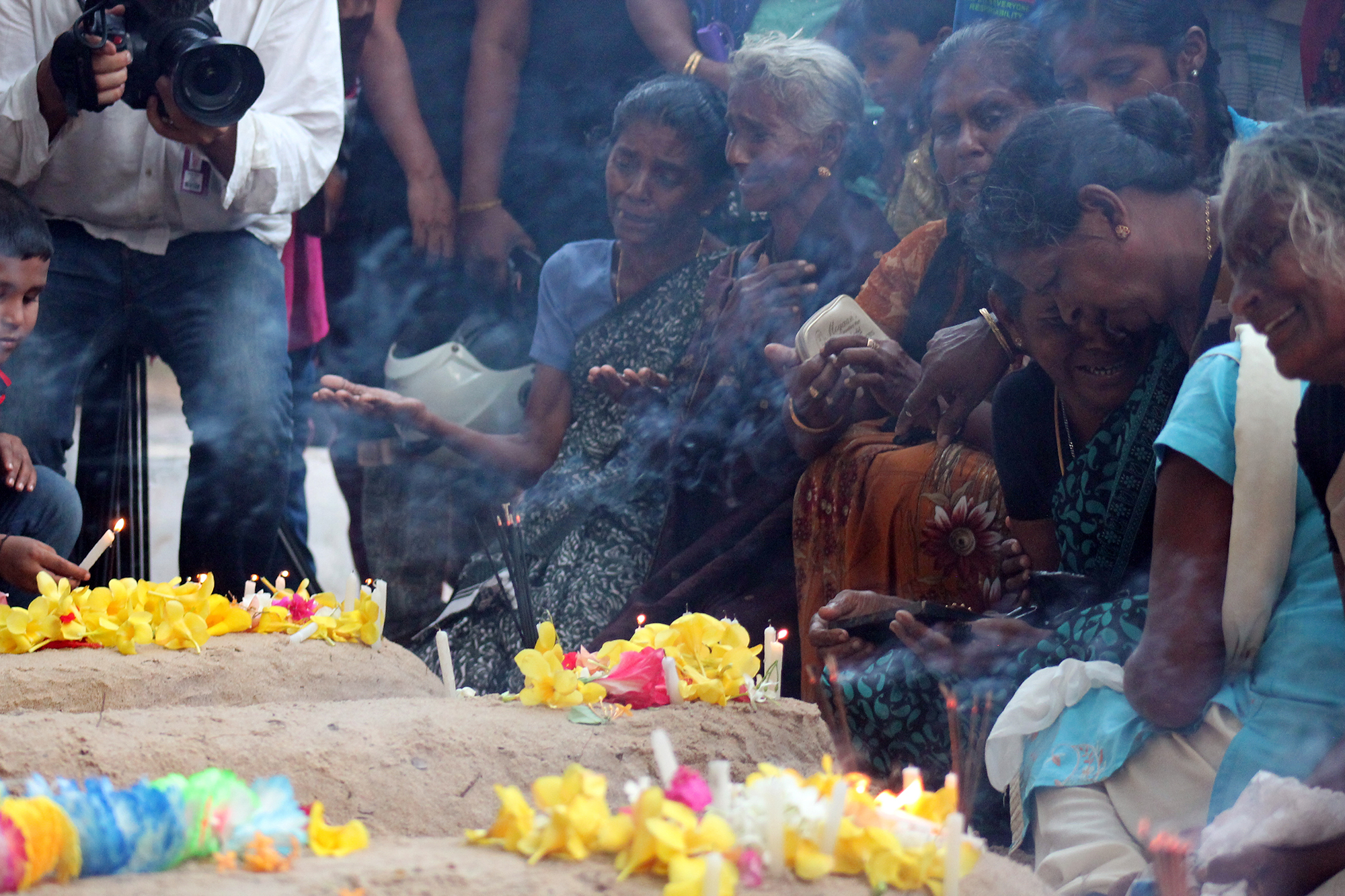
Mullivaikkal Remembrance day, 2016: Eelam Tamil women and children can be seen grieving in Mullivaikkal

In June 2020, Toronto District School Board (TDSB) unanimously approved a motion calling on the Ministry of Education to incorporate Genocide education as compulsory learning. In this genocide education, Tamil genocide was included as a complimentary component. Around the same time Vijay Thanigasalam, a Progressive Conservative MPP, tabled Ontario bill 104, also known as the 'Tamil Genocide Education Week Act'. The Bill states:

"The seven-day period in each year ending on May 18 is proclaimed as Tamil Genocide Education Week...During that period, all Ontarians are encouraged to educate themselves about, and to maintain their awareness of, the Tamil genocide and other genocides that have occurred in world history."

This Bill was opposed by Sinhalese groups who took the Ontario Legislature to court. However, their constitutional challenge was dismissed as the Ontario judge, Justice Jasmine Akbarali, upheld Bill 104. The court examined evidence and heard arguments from all parties in order to better determine whether or not what occurred amounted to a genocide of Tamils. Justice Jasmine Akbarali stated "The dominant characteristic of the law is to educate the public about what the Ontario Legislature has concluded is a Tamil genocide." On appeal the Federal Court of Appeal affirmed the lower court's ruling that the law does not infringe on Ontario's Sinhalese community's free expression and equality rights, while it disagreed lower court's definition of the law as "educative", stating that the law's "dominant purpose is to affirm and commemorate the Tamil Ontarian community's experience of the Sri Lankan Civil War and thus promote, within Ontario, the values of human rights, diversity and multiculturalism." The judgement further pointed out that the bill blamed the Sri Lankan state for the alleged genocidal policies and not the Sinhalese Buddhist as a racial group.

=== United Kingdom ===
The framing of the atrocities as a genocide has also been advocated by various organizations in the UK Tamil diaspora as a contentious feature of their campaigns.

== Sri Lankan Government stance ==
The Sri Lankan Foreign Minister Vijitha Herath stated in May 2025 that the government rejected the claims of a Tamil genocide, claiming that there was no deliberate targeting and killing of Tamil people by the Sri Lankan armed forces. He also said that the government will take legal action against those claiming the Sri Lankan military committed genocide during the civil war.

== In popular culture ==
=== Novels ===
- The Story of A Brief Marriage
- A Passage North
- Vanni: A Family's Struggle through the Sri Lankan Conflict

=== Songs ===
- Born Free (2010), song by M.I.A.
- One Hundred Thousand Flowers (2020), from the album Made in Jaffna song by Shan Vincent de Paul

=== Documentaries ===
- Sri Lanka's Killing Fields
- Sri Lanka's Killing Fields: War Crimes Unpunished
- I Witnessed Genocide: Inside Sri Lanka's Killing Fields
- No Fire Zone

=== Movies ===
- Vanni Mouse, directed by Tamiliam Subas
- A Gun & a Ring, directed by Lenin M. Sivam
- Sinamkol

== See also ==
- The Tamil Genocide by Sri Lanka
- War crimes during the final stages of the Sri Lankan Civil War
