= Varatharajah Thurairajah =

Sri Lankan physician (born 1975)

- Born: 3 March 1975 (age 51)
- Occupations: Physician, activist
- Known for: Serving civilians in the Sri Lankan civil war
- Awards: Lifetime Service Award

Varatharajah Thurairajah (born 3 March 1975) is a Sri Lankan Tamil physician and human rights activist. He was an official witness to United Nations investigations of war crimes and human rights violations in Sri Lanka, and a witness to the events that took place in the Mullivaikkal "no-fire zone" during the final weeks of the Sri Lankan civil war. Thurairajah publicly spoke about alleged war crimes and civilian casualties during the civil war's final stages. From 2019 onward, he has focused on advocacy and public engagement related to the experiences and legacy of Tamil civilians during the Sri Lankan civil war.

== Career ==
=== Missions ===
==== Eechilampatru and Vakarai ====
In 2006, Varatharajah arrived in Vakarai, Sri Lanka, as a refugee, where he helped establish and maintain a makeshift hospital to replace the one destroyed in the 2004 Indian Ocean tsunami. The British Broadcasting Corporation (BBC) reported that when Vakarai was captured by Sri Lankan government forces in January 2007, Thurairajah was the last person to leave the town.

==== Mullivaikkal, Mullaitivu ====
In January 2009, the Sri Lankan government announced that there were only 80,000 people in the areas of the Northern Province controlled by the Liberation Tigers of Tamil Eelam (LTTE), while independent organizations' estimates put the population between 250,000 and 300,000 people. Since foreign media were absent in the war zone, Thurairajah was allegedly a source for reporting the humanitarian crisis to the outside world. During that time, some believe that the Sri Lankan government independently declared a no-fire zone in the village of Suthanthirapuram without consulting any medical staff.

Puthukkudiyiruppu Hospital was not included in the no-fire zone. After the announcement of the no-fire zone, people were forced to move to Suthanthirapuram, where all civilians were crowded into a small area. It was later revealed that more people were killed in the no-fire zone area than in any other area. Varatharajah stayed at Puthukkudiyiruppu Hospital, treating casualties from Suthanthirapuram; he was informing the International Committee of the Red Cross (ICRC), international NGOs, and the Sri Lankan government of the situation. Dr. Thangamutha Sathiyamoorthy, the regional director of health services in Kilinochchi, and fellow staff members moved to Mullaitivu and worked with Varatharajah. Government doctors, including Varatharajah, with other medical staff and volunteers, served nearly 340,000 people in the war zone. After several weeks, Puthukkudiyiruppu Hospital was also destroyed by government bombs and shells.

Varatharajah and his team relocated to the Puthalam and Mullivaikkal areas. There, they established a makeshift hospital in a school to treat casualties. He reported on the number of dead and injured in the area, as well as the shortages of medical supplies and food. Additionally, he contacted the ICRC to arrange for the boat evacuation of critically injured and ill individuals from the war zone. This effort resulted in the rescue of approximately 10,000 injured civilians while also raising global awareness of the humanitarian crisis.

==== Detention and media appearances ====
During the last days of the war, Varatharajah attended to patients at the Mullivaikkal hospital. During this period, he suffered injuries to his shoulder and abdomen. While still suffering from these injuries, he was arrested by the army on 15 May 2009 and detained for about 100 days. He was kept at an unknown location and denied medical treatment for his injuries, leading to additional complications and septic shock.

On 23 May 2009, he was taken to the fourth floor of the Criminal Investigation Department (CID). On 8 July 2009, doctors who had remained in the war zone, including Varatharajah, were forced by the government in front of the media to deny their reporting from the war zone. Suresh Sallay has been identified as the military intelligence officer responsible for coercing Varatharajah to give false testimony. After being released from prison, Varatharajah contacted the UN and other human rights groups and attested that he and the other doctors had been forced to give false accounts of their experience. He requested that the UN and other human rights groups "correct the record and report the truth."

==== Human rights activism ====
In December 2011, award-winning journalist Callum Macrae from Channel 4 media interviewed Varatharajah in New York about Sri Lanka’s human rights violations and war crimes.

In 2013, he participated and provided his testimony as a witness to the Permanent People’s Tribunal in Bremen, Germany in front of a list of panelists from former UN representatives.

In 2014, he attended a United Nations human rights session in Geneva, where he delivered a speech and participated in a side event. As a Human Rights Watch sponsored member, he spoke at the UN General Assembly. He was interviewed by Channel 4 UK, where he raised awareness of the war crimes and crimes against humanity committed during the 2009 conflict.

In May 2015, Varatharajah participated in the 6th annual remembrance of the Tamil genocide in 2009 and provided a public speech in London, United Kingdom. Following that, he met several parliamentarians in London and discussed human rights violations and crimes against humanity, advocating justice for the victims.

In April 2016, he delivered a speech about the human rights violations by the Sri Lankan government and the final days of the war at a symposium organized by the Boston Amnesty International in New York.

In May 2019, he was invited to the Canadian parliament as a guest speaker at the screening of Callum Macrae’s documentary No Fire Zone on the tenth year of Mullivaikkal Remembrance Day and shared his war zone experiences.

== Awards and recognition ==
Thurairajah was a finalist for the Robert Burns Humanitarian Award in 2021 and received the Lifetime Service Award from Ilankai Tamil Sangam USA in 2017. His memoir, A Note from the No Fire Zone, written by Kass Ghayouri, was published in 2019, and a biography, Untold Truth of Tamil Genocide, written by Raji Patterson, was published in 2021. In 2020, he appeared in The Lamp of Truth, a film based on his war zone experiences. He has given media interviews to outlets including Channel 4, BBC, and Al Jazeera. He was nominated for the Nobel Peace Prize.
