= Tamil Genocide Education Week Act =

Legislation of the Parliament of Ontario designated a week

Tamil Genocide Education Week Act, 2021
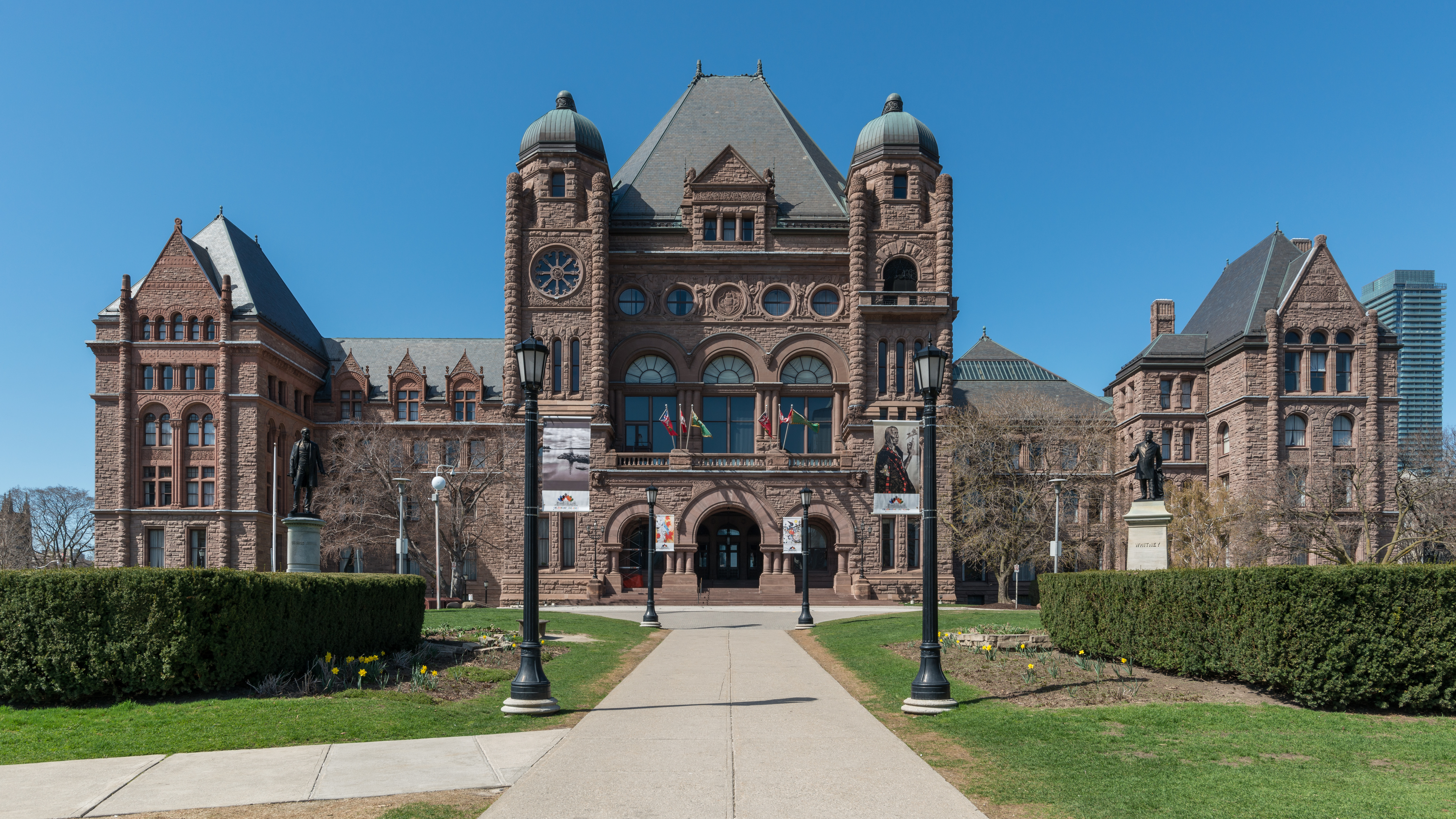

Parliament of Ontario
- Long title: An Act to proclaim Tamil Genocide Education Week
- Citation: Ontario Legislature
- Territorial extent: Ontario
- Enacted by: Parliament of Ontario
- Royal assent: May 12, 2021

Legislative history
- Bill citation: Status of Bill 66
- Introduced by: Vijay Thanigasalam
- First reading: Legislative Assembly of Ontario: April 30, 2019
- Second reading: May 16, 2019
- Third reading: May 6, 2021

The Tamil Genocide Education Week Act (Bill 104, 2021) is a law introduced by PC MPP Vijay Thanigasalam and unanimously adopted during the 42nd Parliament of Ontario.

Tamil Genocide Education Week Act, proclaims, that “the seven-day period in each year ending on May 18 is proclaimed as Tamil Genocide Education Week. During that period, all Ontarians are encouraged to educate themselves about, and to maintain their awareness of, the Tamil genocide and other genocides that have occurred in world history.”

The Act is the first time claims of the Tamil genocide were officially recognized by a government in the Tamil diaspora.

== Legislative history ==
On April 30th, 2019, Thanigasalam introduced Bill 104, Tamil Genocide Education Week Act.

Ontario’s Tamil youth were instrumental in the advocacy that led to the passing of the legislation through the viral online “I am Tamil” campaign which encouraged many Tamil youth to unite and express that Tamil Genocide is part of their identity by sharing their stories and trauma.

In 2021, Ontario Premier Doug Ford expressed his support for the legislation and the Tamil community across the province.

PC MPP Stephen Lecce said at the time how “It is incumbent on political leaders to name it and shame it [Tamil genocide], to acknowledge the genocide that was committed, to acknowledge and recognize.

NDP MPP Gurratan Singh noted how “it is so important to name the Tamil genocide, recognize it and continue to remember it, so the Tamil people can share their memories of those who were lost to make sure their stories are told and to educate the community for generations to come, because we can only heal from trauma once we confront it”.

Liberal MPP Mitzie Hunter also spoke in favour of the bill on Mullivaikkal Remembrance Day noting how “this day marks the end of the 25-year-long civil war war where thousands of innocent civilians were killed during the Tamil genocide in Sri Lanka”, further expressing how the “wounds are still fresh” within the Tamil community, highlighting the importance of recognition.

The bill passed with unanimous support from all parties on May 6th, 2021 and received royal assent on May 12, 2021.

== Reaction ==
The Act received overwhelmingly positive support from the Tamil community in Ontario and across Canada.

Upon its passing, the National Council of Canadian Tamils said how “this acknowledgement not only seeks to honour the lives that were lost with the Tamil Genocide, but also gives a sense of hope to those who have suffered life-long intergenerational trauma and represents the first step to healing and reconciliation. By recognizing the Tamil Genocide, we affirm our collective desire to maintain awareness of this genocide and other genocides to prevent such crimes against humanity from happening again”.

Since 2021, schools boards across Ontario have recognized Tamil Genocide Education Week in their schools including the Toronto District School Board (TDSB), Toronto Catholic District School Board (TCDSB), York Region District School Board (YRDSB), Peel District School Board (PDSB), Durham District School Board (DDSB), and Ottawa Catholic School Board (OCSB).

In 2022, following the passage of the Tamil Genocide Education Week Act in Ontario, the Parliament of Canada unanimously adopted a motion to recognize May 18 as Tamil Genocide Remembrance Day.

== Legal Challenges ==
On February 26th, 2022, the Sri Lankan Canadian Action Coalition challenged the Act in the Ontario Superior Court of Justice as being unconstitutional.

On June 28th, 2022, Justice Jasmine Akbarali rejected the challenge saying “Ontario is permitted to recognize a Tamil genocide for purposes of legislating with respect to educational initiatives related to it, or indeed, for commemorating it. This is no different than provincial legislation that recognizes and commemorates the Holocaust”.

In 2024, the case was brought to the Court of Appeal for Ontario and that ruling was affirmed, highlighting that its main purpose is to “commemorate the Tamil Ontarian community’s experience of the Sri Lankan Civil War and thus promote, within Ontario, the values of human rights, diversity, and multiculturalism.”

In 2025, the Supreme Court of Canada dismissed the final appeal, upholding the Act as constitutional.

Thanigasalam highlighted the Supreme Court ruling as “a major victory for the Tamil people in Canada and across the world and a key step forward toward healing and education for future generations.”
