= Together Against Genocide =

US-based non-governmental organization

Together Against Genocide (TAG, formerly Tamils Against Genocide) is a non-governmental organization formed in 2008, based in Columbia, Maryland, United States, which has actively protested the Sri Lankan Civil War and what it argues is the genocide of Sri Lankan Tamils. Tamils Against Genocide hired US attorney Bruce Fein to file human rights violation charges against two Sri Lankan officials associated with the civil war in Sri Lanka which has reportedly claimed the lives of thousands of civilians. The TAG got Bruce Fein to author the book The Tamil Genocide by Sri Lanka, retaining its copyrights to it.

== Publications ==
- The Tamil Genocide by Sri Lanka

== See also ==
- 2009 Tamil diaspora protests
