= Tamil Genocide Monument =

- Interactive map of Tamil Genocide Monument
- Location: Chinguacousy Park, Brampton, Ontario, Canada
- Coordinates: 43°43′20.71″N 79°43′16.22″W
- Type: Memorial
- Material: Steel
- Height: 4.8 m (16 ft)
- Inauguration date: May 11, 2025
- Dedicated to: Victims of Tamil Genocide

The Tamil Genocide Monument is a monument in the Chinguacousy Park in Brampton, Ontario, Canada, dedicated to the victims of the Tamil Genocide in Sri Lanka. The monument, opened in May 2025, is 4.8-metre tall stainless steel monument with a map outline of Tamil Eelam.

== History ==
The destruction of Mullivaikkal memorial at the University of Jaffna in 2019, led to an outrage from the Tamil diaspora and In January 2021 Canadian Mayor Patrick Brown promised to build a monument commemorating the victims of Tamil genocide. The Brampton City Council unanimously voted for the proposal. Brown stated: "Where they tear down a statue and they tear down history in Sri Lanka that we would do the opposite in Canada. That we would build a monument to remember the victims, to remember the genocide". After some delays and redesign, In February 2024, the Brampton City Council approved the final design for the Tamil Genocide Memorial which is to be built in Chinguacousy Park by 2025. The monument was opposed by the Sri Lankan government which summoned the Canadian High Commissioner in Colombo to convey its disapproval. A group of Sinhalese Canadians also protested at the construction site where a foundation stone of the monument was being laid. The construction of the monument was completed and opened on May 11, 2025. After completion the Sri Lankan government protested the monument.

== See also ==
- Mullivaikal Muttram
