= Varatharajah =

Varatharajah is a name. People with the name include:

- Varatharajah Thurairajah
- Senthuran Varatharajah
- Annamalai Varatharajah Perumal
