= Mullivaikal Muttram =

War memorial

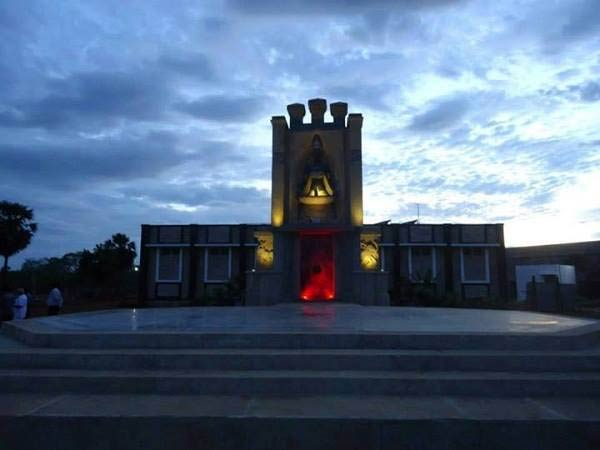
- Illuminated sculpture of Tamil Paavai (Tamil Goddess/Tamil Mother), at the entrance of Mullivaikal Muttram
- Location: Thanjavur, Tamil Nadu, India
- Coordinates: 10°45′05″N 79°09′05″E
- Type: Memorial
- Beginning date: 15 November 2010
- Dedicated date: 6 November 2013
- Dedicated to: Victims of Mullivaikkal massacre

The Mullivaikkal Memorial or Mullivaikkal Muttram is a memorial dedicated to the Mullivaikkal massacre, the killings of Tamil civilians during the final phase of the war between Liberation Tigers of Tamil Eelam (LTTE) and Sri Lankan armed forces at Mullivaikkal in 2009. The Mullivaikal Memorial is in the Thanjavur District of the Tamil Nadu state in neighboring India. On 6 November 2013, the inauguration of the Mullivaikal Memorial took place. Tamil leader Pazha Nedumaran and the World Tamil Confederation Trust he heads are the founders.

== History ==
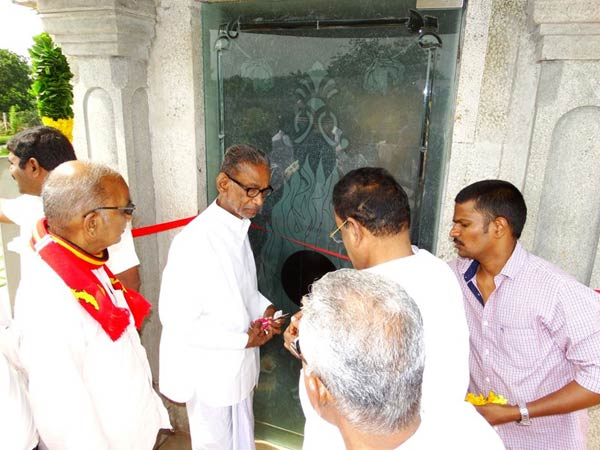
Pazha Nedumaran inaugurating the memorial

=== Construction ===
The construction of the memorial had initially began on 15 November 2010, and the foundation stone was laid by Vaiyapuri Gopalsamy (Vaiko) and R. Nallakannu. The Mullivaikal Memorial was originally intended as merely a memorial pillar, but owing to increasing desecration of the Tamil memorials in Sri Lanka, a larger construction was chosen to memorialize the bloody civil strife that had killed so many Tamils in Sri Lanka throughout history.

The construction of the memorial was commissioned by the Ulaga Tamil Peravai (World Tamil Confederation) and was supervised by Pazha Nedumaran, the founder and the chief of the Confederation, as well as the Tamil National Movement.

According to Nedumaran,

"This is a memorial that will showcase to the world the ignominy and untold sufferings of Tamil people in the tear-drop nation. It will remind every Tamilian that the fire should burn in the heart of all Tamilian until the criminals of the Eelam war are punished."

Funds to build the memorial were raised from various sources, says Nedumaran. The land for the memorial and a major portion of the capital cost was donated by noted Tamil activist M. Natarajan, once a student protester against the anti-Hindi movement Tamil Nadu and later chief editor of Tamilarasi magazine.

=== Inauguration ===
The inauguration of the memorial took place on 6 November 2013, two days ahead of the originally scheduled date. The inauguration saw the participation of several leading politicians and activists of the state, such as Nallakannu (CPI), Vaiko (Marumalarchi Dravida Munnetra Kazhagam – MDMK) chief, Seeman (chief co-ordinator of the Naam Tamilar Katchi), SP Udayakumar (Kudankulam activist) and Pon Radhakrishnan (Bharatiya Janata Party – BJP).

== Memorial ==
=== Sculptural features ===
The Mullivaikkal Muttram has come into shape through contributions of sculptors and artists from far and wide.

The sculptures have been fashioned based on the line drawings rendered by artist Veera Santhanam and have been carved out by Mamallapuram Sthapathi Murugan and his team. Hundreds of sculptors from across the state carved stone to raise the memorial without taking a fee, according to Nedumaran.

A beautiful stone sculpture dedicated to Tamil Pavai (Tamil Mother) holding a lamp commemorating the people who lost their lives at Mullivaikal, constitutes the central part of the memorial. The statue carved out of a single stone weighs more than 60 tonnes and is mounted on a 15-feet pedestal. The Pavai is representative of the best of Tamil womanhood, culture, and ethos. Beneath the Tamil Mother Goddess statue, soil which is blood soaked from Mullivaikal kept in two glass vessels. Pupils pay respect to the glass vessel to honour the sacrifice made by Eelam people and Eelam freedom fighters (Liberation Tigers of Tamil Eelam – LTTE).

Two friezes, each fifty-five feet long and ten feet tall, stand on either side of the Pavai. One of them showcases the 20 young men in Tamil Nadu such as Abdul Rahoof, Muthukumaran, Murugadasan, and Pallapatti. Ravi who had self-immolated in support of Tamil Eelam. The other frieze represents the people who had died during the fourth Eelam war.

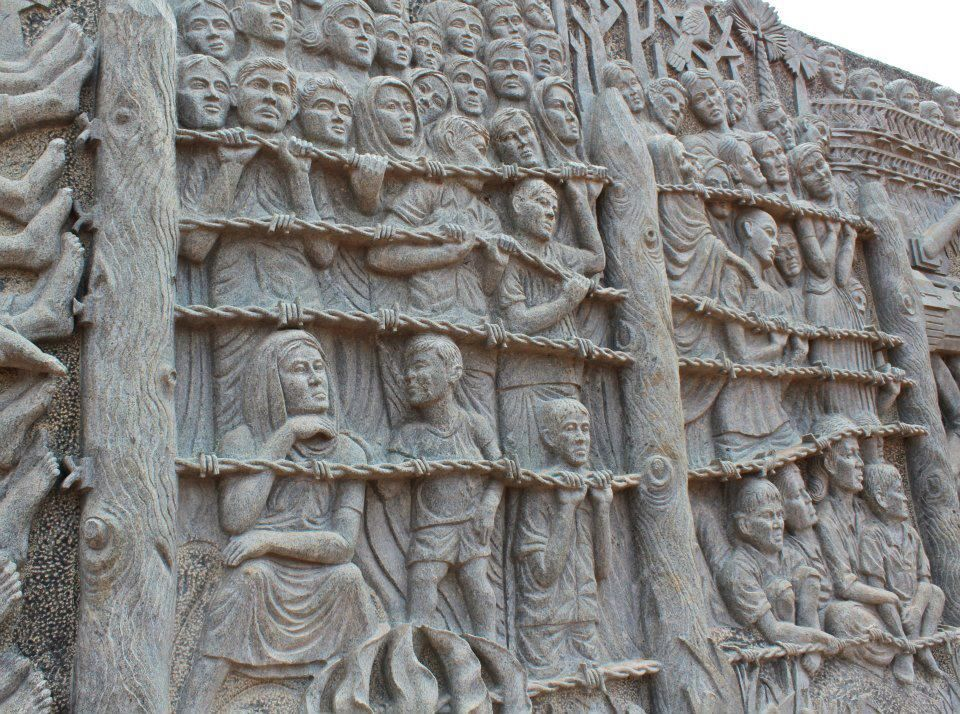
Depiction of Tamil civilians being held behind barbed wires in Sri Lankan IDP Camps

Sculptures spread throughout the memorial depict the stories of the Eezham Tamils, from the burning of Jaffna library in 1983 to the mass massacres they had endured. The sculptures show images of Sencholai – a massacre of school children, the sufferings of internally displaced people in internally displaced persons (IDP) camps in a menik farm and in the IDP camp of Kilinoichi, cluster bombing and phosphorus bombing by the Sri Lankan army in a no-fire zone, wailing mothers, broken limbs, guns, and dead bodies. Some sculptures also portray the peaceful lives Eezham Tamils led in the island nation and depict their various cultural identities including the national bird and the national tree of Tamil Eelam.

There is a sculpture for Charles Antony (approximately 24 years old) and Balachandran (12 years old) who died during the 2009 civil war.

=== Art museum ===
Behind the Pavai is a building that houses portrait and photo galleries. Portraits of the people who lost their lives in the Eelam wars are on display here, among them the Tamil Tigers chief Velupillai Prabhakaran's parents, Parvathiammal and Thiruvenkatam Velupillai, and his two sons Charles Anthony and Balachandran, LTTE ideologue Anton Balasingham, Tamilchelvan, Thileepan, Annai Bhoopathi, Kittu, Balraj, Sivakumaran, Malathi, Miller, and Angayarkanni among others.

A photo gallery at the memorial's conference hall houses hundreds of photos of those who dedicated their lives for the cause of the Tamil language. The galleries also exhibit photos of Tamil kings like Pandara Vanniyan – Vanni Tamil eelam, Sangiliyan – Jaffna Tamil Eelam, Kattabomman, Puli Thevan, Velu Nachiyar, Sethupathy, the Maruthu Brothers, and Theeran Chinamalai who resisted colonial rule. Other photos on display are those of the Tamil scholars and artistes including non-Tamils who have contributed to the development of the language.

== Location and access ==
The Mullivaikal Muttram complex is spread out on a 1.75-acre plot at Vilar, a village situated 5 km from Thanjavur on the Thanjavur-Tiruchirappalli national highway.

Buses which ply to Vilar from the old bus station of Thanjavur are the main sources of public transport. The memorial can be easily accessed from Anna Nagar market of Thanjavur.

== See also ==
- Hiroshima Peace Memorial
- Mullivaikkal Remembrance Day
- Srebrenica Genocide Memorial
