= Vijay Thanigasalam =

Canadian politician (born 1989)

The Honourable Vijay Thanigasalam ECO MPP
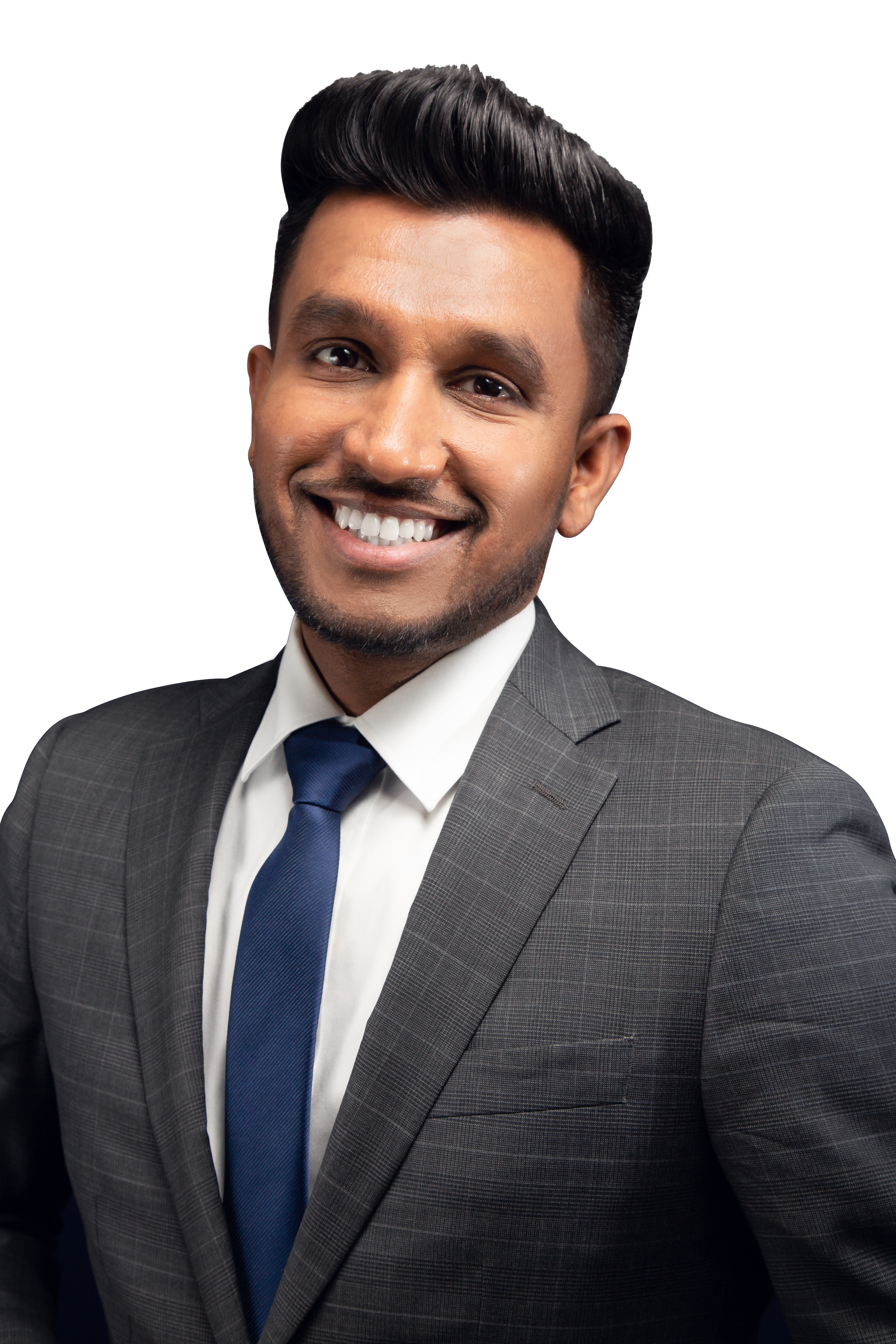

Associate Minister of Artificial Intelligence Adoption
- Incumbent
- Assumed office September 10, 2026
- Premier: Doug Ford
- Preceded by: Position established

Associate Minister of Mental Health and Addictions
- In office March 19, 2025 – September 10, 2026
- Premier: Doug Ford
- Preceded by: Michael Tibollo
- Succeeded by: Michelle Cooper

Associate Minister of Housing
- In office June 6, 2024 – March 19, 2025
- Premier: Doug Ford
- Preceded by: Rob Flack
- Succeeded by: Graydon Smith

Associate Minister of Transportation
- In office September 22, 2023 – June 6, 2024
- Premier: Doug Ford
- Preceded by: Todd McCarthy
- Succeeded by: Position abolished

Member of the Ontario Provincial Parliament for Scarborough—Rouge Park
- Incumbent
- Assumed office June 7, 2018
- Preceded by: Riding established

Personal details
- Born: March 8, 1989 (age 37) Jaffna District, Sri Lanka
- Party: Progressive Conservative Party of Ontario
- Education: Ontario Tech (BCom); Queen's University (MBA)

Vijay Thanigasalam ECO MPP (born March 8, 1989) is a Sri Lankan born Canadian politician who has served as the Associate Minister of Artificial Intelligence Adoption since September 10, 2026. Thanigasalam sits as the member of Provincial Parliament (MPP) for Scarborough—Rouge Park, representing the Ontario Progressive Conservative (PC) Party. Thanigasalam was elected in 2018 and has been in the provincial cabinet since 2023, first as the associate minister of transportation, then as associate minister of housing, before moving to the Ministry of Health as the associate minister of mental health and addictions. He is the first Tamil-Canadian to sit in the provincial cabinet in Ontario.

== Early life and education ==
Born in 1989 in Sri Lanka, Thanigasalam lived with his family in Valvettithurai before he escaped the Sri Lankan Civil War to India with his mother and elder brother at the age of seven, and later immigrated to Canada at the age of 14. He attended St. Joan of Arc Catholic Academy (then known as Jean Vanier Catholic Secondary School) while working multiple part-time jobs. At this time, he began to get involved and volunteer with many community organizations in Scarborough. He went on to study at the University of Toronto Scarborough and completed his Bachelor of Commerce in Finance at Ontario Tech University. After graduation, Thanigasalam worked at CIBC and RBC in Toronto. In 2024, Thanigasalam completed a Master of Business Administration at the Smith School of Business at Queen's University.

== Political career ==
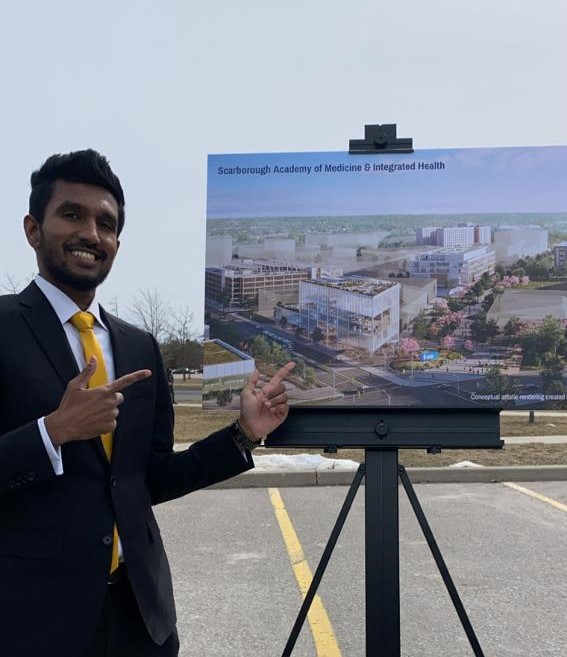
Thanigasalam at the future site of the SAMIH

Thanigasalam first ran for office in the 2018 Ontario election, as a candidate of the Ontario Progressive Conservative Party. During the 2018 campaign, he apologized for his Facebook posts supporting the LTTE, Sri Lankan Tamil separatist group banned in Canada, following a controversy. On June 7, 2018, Thanigasalam was elected to the Legislative Assembly of Ontario as the Member of Provincial Parliament (MPP) for Scarborough—Rouge Park.

In 2019, Thanigasalam was named Parliamentary Assistant to the Minister of Transportation. In this capacity Thanigasalam and the government announced the building of the Scarborough subway extension, which is currently under construction. He also secured funding for the Tamil Community Centre within his riding of Scarborough—Rouge Park, which has the highest concentration of Tamil Canadians in Canada.

In 2022, Thanigasalam supported the provincial government’s $1 billion plan to revitalize the Scarborough Health Network’s aging infrastructure. The funding included plans for a new emergency department at Centenary Hospital and a complete redevelopment of the Birchmount Hospital. Thanigasalam was also involved in announcing the Scarborough Academy of Medicine and Integrated Health (SAMIH) at the University of Toronto Scarborough, which will be the first ever medical school in Scarborough and the largest expansion of an undergraduate and postgraduate medical school in Toronto since the founding of the University of Toronto Faculty of Medicine in 1843.

Thanigasalam was re-elected in the 2022 Ontario general election and subsequently named Parliamentary Assistant to the Minister of Infrastructure.

In September 2023, Thanigasalam was appointed Associate Minister of Transportation. As Associate Minister, Thanigasalam was responsible for implementing the Ontario One Fare Program and made progress toward resumption of revenue service on the Ontario Northland Railway.

On June 6, 2024, Thanigasalam was appointed Associate Minister of Housing as part of the Ministry of Municipal Affairs and Housing.

On December 11, 2024, Thanigasalam was acclaimed as the PC Party candidate for Scarborough—Rouge Park for the 2025 Ontario General Election, which took place on February 27, 2025. He was re-elected with 49.17% of the vote, a 3.89% increase from the previous election.

On March 19, 2025, Thanigasalam was appointed Associate Minister of Mental Health and Addictions, as part of the Ministry of Health.

On September 10, 2026, Thanigasalam was appointed as the first ever Associate Minister of Artificial Intelligence Adoption as part of the Ministry of Economic Development, Job Creation and Trade.

=== One Fare Program ===
In February 2024, Thanigasalam implemented Ontario’s One Fare Program alongside Premier Doug Ford, which eliminated double-fares between the Toronto Transit Commission (TTC) and participating regional transit agencies in the Greater Toronto Area, including GO Transit. The announcement of the program was well-received by Transit advocates and was estimated to save the average transit rider $1600 per year. The program went into effect on February 26, 2024, less than one month after the initial announcement.

=== Bill 104 - Tamil Genocide Education Week Act ===
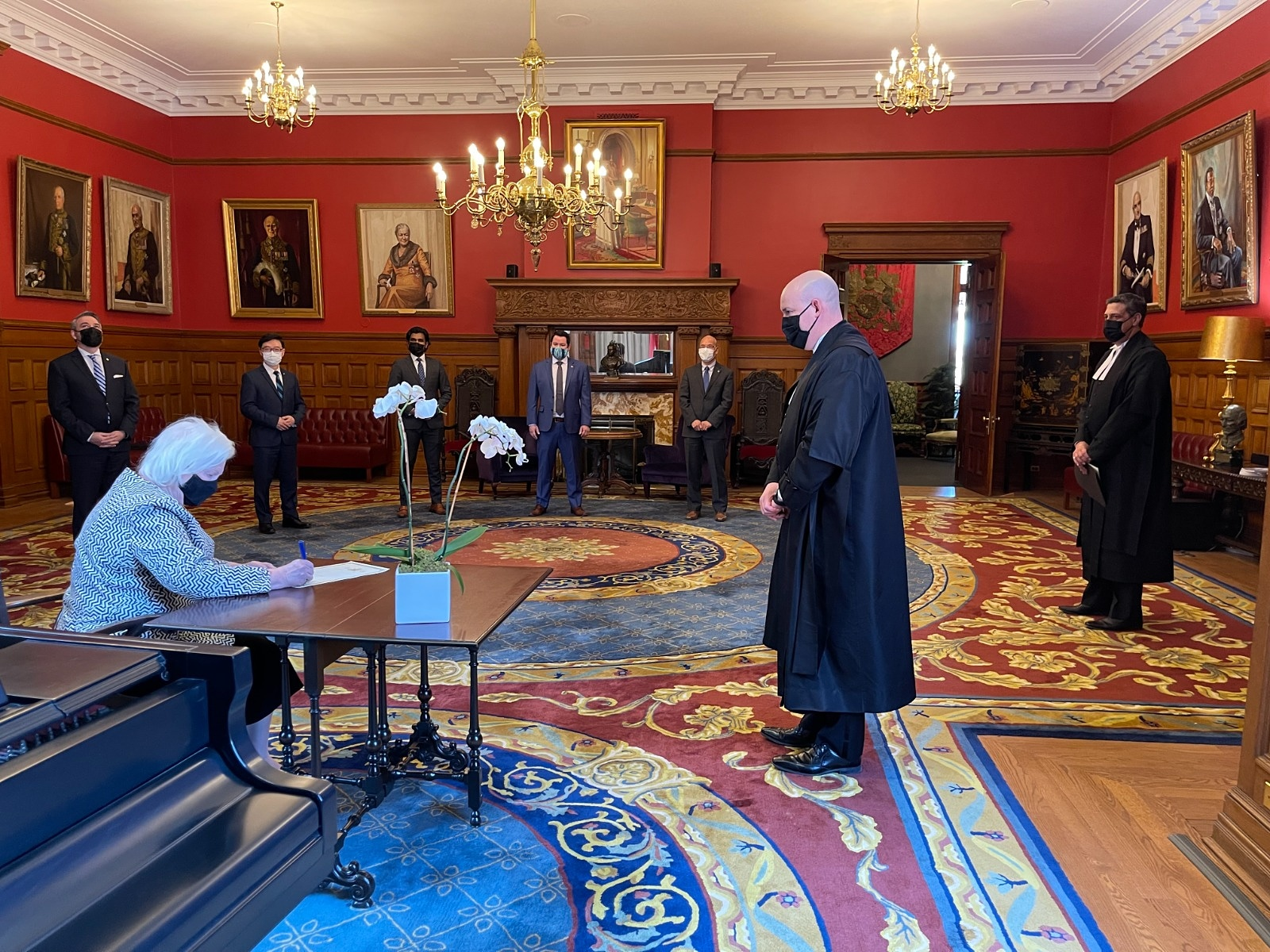
Bill 104 receiving royal assent in May 2021.

In 2019, Thanigasalam introduced Bill 104, Tamil Genocide Education Week Act which proposed a seven-day period ending on May 18 (which marks the Mullivaikkal Remembrance Day) to be recognized as Tamil Genocide Education Week in Ontario. The bill passed and received royal assent on May 12, 2021. The bill recognizes how Tamil-Ontarian families "have been physically or mentally traumatized by the genocide that the Sri Lankan state perpetrated against the Tamils during the civil war which lasted from 1983 to 2009, and especially so in May 2009."

Thanigasalam stated that Bill 104 is the first time that claims of the Tamil genocide were officially recognized by a government in the Tamil diaspora and this was significant for the Tamil community in Canada and across the world. Talking of his own childhood experiences during the war; Thanigasalam stated that the passage of the bill into law "would help the Tamil-Canadian community start the healing of wartime trauma and assure them one government understands their pain".

== Electoral record ==
2025 Ontario general election: Scarborough—Rouge Park
Party	Candidate	Votes	%	±%
Progressive Conservative	Vijay Thanigasalam	16,357	49.17	+3.89
Liberal	Morris Beckford	13,385	40.23	+12.52
New Democratic	Hibah Sidat	2,360	7.09	–14.83
Green	Victoria Jewt	727	2.19	–0.22
None of the Above	Tim James	326	0.98	N/A
Communist	Wai Kiat Tang	114	0.34	N/A
Total valid votes/expense limit		33,269	99.48	–0.14
Total rejected, unmarked, and declined ballots		174	0.52	+0.14
Turnout		33,444	42.64	–2.48
Eligible voters		78,437		
Progressive Conservative hold		Swing		–4.32
Source: Elections Ontario

2022 Ontario general election: Scarborough—Rouge Park
Party	Candidate	Votes	%	±%	Expenditures
Progressive Conservative	Vijay Thanigasalam	15,989	45.28	+6.66	$51,906
Liberal	Manal Abdullahi	9,784	27.71	+6.80	$64,073
New Democratic	Felicia Samuel	7,742	21.92	−14.40	$82,981
Green	Priyan De Silva	850	2.41	−0.01	$806
Ontario Party	Gordon Kerr	523	1.48		$7,952
New Blue	Christopher Bressi	285	0.81		$0
Freedom	Matthew Oliver	139	0.39		$0
Total valid votes/expense limit		35,312	99.62	+0.50	$109,994
Total rejected, unmarked, and declined ballots		135	0.38	-0.50	
Turnout		35,447	45.12	-10.42	
Eligible voters		77,916			
Progressive Conservative hold		Swing		−0.07	
Source(s): "Summary of Valid Votes Cast for Each Candidate" (PDF). Elections Ontario. 2022. Archived from the original on 2023-05-18.; "Statistical Summary by Electoral District" (PDF). Elections Ontario. 2022. Archived from the original on 2023-05-21.

2018 Ontario general election: Scarborough—Rouge Park
Party	Candidate	Votes	%
Progressive Conservative	Vijay Thanigasalam	16,224	38.61
New Democratic	Felicia Samuel	15,261	36.32
Liberal	Sumi Shan	8,785	20.91
Green	Priyan De Silva	1,014	2.41
Libertarian	Todd Byers	582	1.39
Trillium	Amit Mahendra Pitamber	149	0.35
Total valid votes		42,015	99.12
Total rejected, unmarked and declined ballots		372	0.88
Turnout		42,387	
Eligible voters			
Progressive Conservative pickup new district.			
Source: Elections Ontario

== Cabinet posts ==
Ford ministry, Province of Ontario (2018–present)
Cabinet posts (4)
Predecessor	Office	Successor
None	Associate Minister of Artificial Intelligence Adoption; September 10, 2026 - present	Incumbent
Michael Tibollo	Associate Minister of Mental Health and Addictions; March 19, 2025 - September 10, 2026	Michelle Cooper
Rob Flack	Associate Minister of Housing; June 6, 2024 – March 19, 2025	Graydon Smith
Todd McCarthy	Associate Minister of Transportation; September 22, 2023 – June 6, 2024	None
