= Yasmin Sooka =

South African human rights lawyer

Personal details
- Born: Cape Town, South Africa
- Education: University of the Witwatersrand
- Occupation: Human rights Lawyer
- Profession: Lawyer

Yasmin Louise Sooka (born 10 October 1957) is a South African human rights lawyer and activist. She is the Executive Director of the Foundation for Human Rights in South Africa and the International Truth and Justice Project (ITJP), an independent non-profit organisation based in London working since 2013 to protect and promote justice and accountability in Sri Lanka.

She was born in Cape Town, South Africa, and got a law degree from the University of the Witwatersrand. During the Apartheid, she was a member of the World Conference on Religion and Peace (South African Chapter) and served as the President of the WCRP. She was a member of the National Repatriation Committee for South African exiles. In 1995, she was appointed to the South African Truth and Reconciliation Commission as the Deputy Chair of the Human Rights Violations Committee and was responsible for finalizing the Commission’s final report handed over to President Mbeki in March 2003. She chaired the Commission’s legal sub-committee between 1995 and 2001. Since 2000, she has also been a member of the Advisory Body on the Review of Resolution 1325. She was appointed to the Sierra Leone Truth and Reconciliation Commission by Mary Robinson severing from 2002 to 2004. In July 2010, Ms. Sooka was appointed to the three-member Panel of Experts advising the UN Secretary General on accountability for war crimes committed during the final stages of the war in Sri Lanka. She was appointed as Chair of the United Nations Commission on Human Rights in South Sudan in 2016.
