= International Truth and Justice Project =

- Established: 2013; 13 years ago
- Type: Private limited company
- Headquarters: London, England, United Kingdom
- Executive director: Yasmin Sooka
- Website: https://itjpsl.com/

International Truth and Justice Project (ITJP) is a human rights non-governmental organization established in 2013 to gather evidence to hold the Government of Sri Lanka accountable for war crimes during the final stages of the Sri Lankan civil war. Located in South Africa while being registered in London, United Kingdom as a private limited company, the ITJP publishes its reports and press releases in English, Tamil and Sinhala.

== Members and funding ==
Its executive director is Yasmin Sooka, who served as a member of the United Nations Report of the Secretary-General's Panel of Experts on Accountability in Sri Lanka. Its other directors include British journalist Frances Harrison, Hanif Mohammed Vally and Zaid Kimmie; who have served as the executive directors for the Foundation for Human Rights of South Africa. It has gained grants from the Sigrid Rausing Trust.

== Initiatives ==
=== Sanctions against former Sri Lankan officials ===
As of December 2024, it had submitted over 60 sanctions and visa ban requests against Sri Lankan public and security officials for human rights and economic crimes in Sri Lanka. These have been extended to Indian officials including members of the IPKF.

Following the recommendations by the ITJP, in March 2025 the Government of the United Kingdom imposed travel sanctions on former Sri Lankan army commanders Shavendra Silva and Jagath Jayasuriya, former navy commander Wasantha Karannagoda and former LTTE commander and pro-government paramilitary leader Karuna Amman as part of what the Foreign office called "UK travel bans and asset freezes, target individuals responsible for a range of violations and abuses, such as extrajudicial killings, during the civil war". The sanctions were rejected by the Sri Lankan Ministry of Foreign Affairs, which claimed that the UK government's actions were unilateral, complicated national reconciliation process and past human rights violations should be handled by domestic accountability mechanisms; while the wartime President Mahinda Rajapaksa rejected UK governments allegations of human rights violations. Wartime Army Commander Sarath Fonseka defended Shavendra Silva and criticised sanctions as "unreasonable" but agreed with sanctions against Wasantha Karannagoda and Jagath Jayasuriya.

=== Release of the Batalanda Commission Report ===
In 2025, Frances Harrison brought to global attention the Batalanda Commission Report that found former Sri Lankan President Ranil Wickremesinghe was indirectly responsible for the detention centre. Following this interview, Minister Bimal Rathnayake tabled the Batalanda Commission Report in parliament 14 March 2025. Wickremesinghe responded by denying any wrongdoing and stating that the commission was politically motivated aimed at discrediting him with the report highlighting what he called terrorist acts committed by the Janatha Vimukthi Peramuna.

== See also ==
- Tamil genocide
- War crimes during the final stages of the Sri Lankan Civil War
- Permanent Peoples' Tribunal on Sri Lanka
- North East Secretariat on Human Rights
- University Teachers for Human Rights
- Irish Forum for Peace in Sri Lanka
