= Scarborough—Rouge Park (provincial electoral district) =

Provincial electoral district in Scarborough, Toronto, Canada

Coordinates: 43.805°N 79.176°W

Ontario electoral district
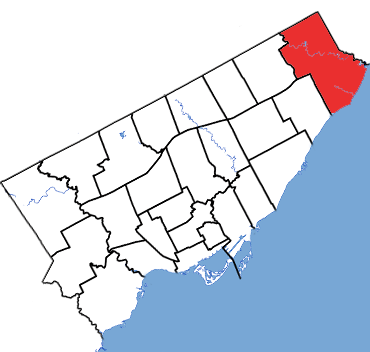
- Scarborough-Rouge Park in relation to the other Toronto ridings (2015 boundaries)

Provincial electoral district
- Legislature: Legislative Assembly of Ontario
MPP
Vijay Thanigasalam
Progressive Conservative
- District created: 2015
- First contested: 2018
- Last contested: 2025

Demographics
- Population (2016): 102,275
- Electors (2018): 76,313
- Area (km²): 55
- Pop. density (per km²): 1,859.5
- Census division: Toronto
- Census subdivision: Toronto

Scarborough—Rouge Park is a provincial electoral district in the district of Scarborough in Toronto, Ontario, Canada. It elects one member to the Legislative Assembly of Ontario. This riding was created in 2015.

== Boundaries ==
On August 14, 2018, the province redrew municipal boundaries via the Better Local Government Act, 2018, S.O. 2018, c. 11 - Bill 5. This means that the 25 Provincial districts and the 25 municipal wards in Toronto currently share the same geographic borders.

Defined in legislation as: "Consisting of that part of the City of Toronto described as follows: commencing at the intersection of the Rouge River with the northerly limit of said city; thence easterly, generally southerly and generally southwesterly along the northerly, easterly and southerly limits of said city to the southerly production of Morningside Avenue; thence northerly along said production and Morningside Avenue to Highway No. 401; thence westerly along said highway to Neilson Road; thence generally northerly along said road to Morningside Avenue; thence northerly along said avenue to the electric power transmission line; thence easterly along said transmission line to the Rouge River; thence generally northerly along said river to the point of commencement."

== Members of Provincial Parliament ==
Scarborough—Rouge Park
Assembly	Years	Member	Party
Riding created from Pickering—Scarborough East, Scarborough—Guildwood and Scarborough—Rouge River
42nd	2018–2022	Vijay Thanigasalam	Progressive Conservative
43rd	2022–present	Vijay Thanigasalam	Progressive Conservative

== Election results ==
Winning party in each polling division of Scarborough—Rouge Park at the 2025 Ontario general election

2025 Ontario general election
Party	Candidate	Votes	%	±%
Progressive Conservative	Vijay Thanigasalam	16,357	49.17	+3.89
Liberal	Morris Beckford	13,385	40.23	+12.52
New Democratic	Hibah Sidat	2,360	7.09	–14.83
Green	Victoria Jewt	727	2.19	–0.22
None of the Above	Tim James	326	0.98	N/A
Communist	Wai Kiat Tang	114	0.34	N/A
Total valid votes/expense limit		33,269	99.48	–0.14
Total rejected, unmarked, and declined ballots		174	0.52	+0.14
Turnout		33,444	42.64	–2.48
Eligible voters		78,437		
Progressive Conservative hold		Swing		▼4.32
Source: Elections Ontario

Winning party in each polling division of Scarborough—Rouge Park at the 2022 Ontario general election

2022 Ontario general election
Party	Candidate	Votes	%	±%	Expenditures
Progressive Conservative	Vijay Thanigasalam	15,989	45.28	+6.66	$51,906
Liberal	Manal Abdullahi	9,784	27.71	+6.80	$64,073
New Democratic	Felicia Samuel	7,742	21.92	−14.40	$82,981
Green	Priyan De Silva	850	2.41	−0.01	$806
Ontario Party	Gordon Kerr	523	1.48		$7,952
New Blue	Christopher Bressi	285	0.81		$0
Freedom	Matthew Oliver	139	0.39		$0
Total valid votes/expense limit		35,312	99.62	+0.50	$109,994
Total rejected, unmarked, and declined ballots		135	0.38	-0.50	
Turnout		35,447	45.12	-10.42	
Eligible voters		77,916			
Progressive Conservative hold		Swing		−0.07	
Source(s): "Summary of Valid Votes Cast for Each Candidate" (PDF). Elections Ontario. 2022. Archived from the original on May 18, 2023.; "Statistical Summary by Electoral District" (PDF). Elections Ontario. 2022. Archived from the original on May 21, 2023.

2018 Ontario general election
Party	Candidate	Votes	%
Progressive Conservative	Vijay Thanigasalam	16,224	38.61
New Democratic	Felicia Samuel	15,261	36.32
Liberal	Sumi Shan	8,785	20.91
Green	Priyan De Silva	1,014	2.41
Libertarian	Todd Byers	582	1.39
Trillium	Amit Mahendra Pitamber	149	0.35
Total valid votes		42,015	99.12
Total rejected, unmarked and declined ballots		372	0.88
Turnout		42,387	55.54
Eligible voters		76,313	
Progressive Conservative pickup new district.			
Source: Elections Ontario

2014 general election redistributed results
Party	Vote	%
Liberal	18,140	47.98
Progressive Conservative	9,290	24.57
New Democratic	9,035	23.90
Green	856	2.26
Others	488	1.29

== See also ==
- List of Ontario provincial electoral districts
- Canadian provincial electoral districts
