= 2015 Northern Province Council resolution on genocide of Tamils =

Law

The Tamil genocide resolution of 2015 was passed by the Northern Provincial Council on 10 February 2015 seeking an UN inquiry to investigate the genocide of the Tamil people in Sri Lanka by successive Sri Lankan Governments, and direct appropriate measures at the International Criminal Court outlining the Tamil people had no faith in the domestic commission.

The resolution which was proposed and tabled by the chief minister of the Northern Province, Justice C. V. Vigneswaran, was enacted with an overwhelming majority in the council. Tabling the motion, Vigneswaran said "this historically important resolution" will help the Tamils take forward their struggle effectively and internationally.

== Observations ==
The resolution outlined the need for the OISL investigation to not restrict itself to the time period of 2002 and 2011 but back to the country's history since 1950s when it achieved independence. The resolution claimed that the genocide of Tamils became synonymous with the country's policies since it gained independence, and Tamils across the island, particularly in the North-East have been subject to gross and systematic human rights violations, culminating in the mass atrocities committed in 2009. Sri Lanka's historic violations include over 60 years of state sponsored anti-Tamil pogroms, massacres, sexual violence, and acts of cultural and linguistic destruction perpetrated by the state. The resolution alleged that these atrocities have been perpetrated with the intent to destroy the Tamil people, and therefore constitute genocide.

Events highlighted include the Disenfranchisement of Indian Origin Tamils in 1948 which stripped them of citizenship, the Sinhala Only Act and the ensuing anti-Tamil pogrom in 1956 and 1958, the Tamil Conference incident in 1974, the Burning of Jaffna library by Sinhala politicians in 1981 and the anti-Tamil pogroms in 1977 and 1983 all of which had occurred before the rise of an organized Tamil military struggle.

Following the outbreak of the civil war in 1983, there had been at least 50 separate incidents of massacres of Tamil civilians. The UN had put the Tamil civilian death toll in the 27-year war at between 60,000 and 100,000. According to Mannar Bishop, Rayappu Joseph, at the end of the 2006-2009 war, 146,679 Tamils were not accounted for. The UN Panel of Experts had said that former Defense Secretary Gotabaya Rajapaksa was involved in the infamous "White Van" abductions of Tamils. The UN Secretary General's Panel of Experts had found that there were "credible" allegations of abduction, rape and sexual violence in the refugee camps against the Security Forces. These genocidal acts "have caused serious mental harm to the Tamils," the resolution said.

Five years after the end of the war, the military still dominates the North, the resolution claimed. In some areas of the North East, there is 1 soldier for every 3 Tamils. In Tamil-speaking areas, the Sri Lankan military has exponentially increased its role in Tamils’ daily life, expanded the amount of land it controls, and is establishing itself as a permanent, occupying presence. And as a result there have been sporadic increase in Sinhalese settlements in Tamil areas, land grabs, construction of Buddhist temples, and conversion of street and village names to Sinhalese. In the Central Province, forced sterilization had rampantly brought down the population of Indian origin Tamils vis-à-vis other communities. In 2007, the US embassy alleged forced abortions. The extreme level of militarization uniquely affects Tamil women. With heavy military presence, the security of 90,000 female-headed households is in jeopardy. These women are especially vulnerable to sexual violence due to the military's predatory practices, the resolution mentioned.

The members of the Council termed the case of genocide of Tamils unique as it has spanned over several decades and still continuing, and was perpetuated by several successive regimes before intensifying into a no-holds-barred war for nearly three decades and culminating in the mass atrocities of 2009. Hence the council, stressed the vitality of international intervention both to combat Sri Lanka's institutionalized impunity and also promote human rights and the values of peace, justice and self-determination for Tamils.

== See also ==
- 2013 Tamil Nadu Assembly Resolution on Sri Lanka
- Permanent Peoples' Tribunal
- Genocides in history
