= Secretary-General's Internal Review Panel on United Nations Action in Sri Lanka =

Secretary-General's Internal Review Panel (IRP) on United Nations Action in Sri Lanka or Independent Review Panel on Sri Lanka is an internal United Nations review panel headed by Charles Petrie. The Panel produced a report (Internal Review Panel Report or Petrie report) that describes a "systemic failure" of United Nations action during the Final Stages of the Sri Lankan Civil War including the withdrawal of UN staff in September 2008 which removed the 'protection by presence' capacity of the United Nations, shortly before months of intense armed conflict that left tens of thousands of dead. The report states, "The Panel of Experts [on Accountability in Sri Lanka] stated that "[a] number of credible sources have estimated that there could have been as many as 40,000 civilian deaths". Some Government sources state the number was well below 10,000. Other sources have referred to credible information indicating that over 70,000 people are unaccounted for." The report concludes with a series of recommendations on how the United Nations can strengthen its protection of human rights in similar situations in the future. The report was presented to United Nations Secretary-General Ban Ki-moon.
