= Francis Boyle =

American human rights lawyer and academic (1950–2025)

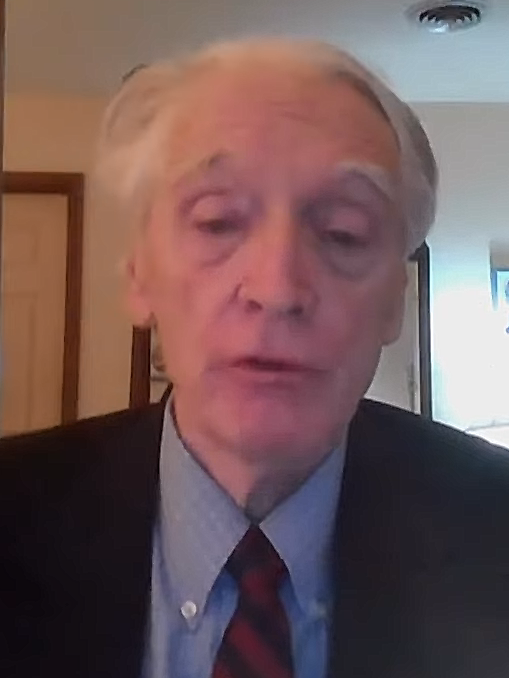
- Boyle in January 2024
- Born: Francis Anthony Boyle; March 25, 1950; Chicago, Illinois, U.S.
- Died: January 30, 2025 (aged 74); Urbana, Illinois, U.S.
- Education: University of Chicago (BA); Harvard University (JD, MA, PhD)
- Occupations: Human rights lawyer and professor of law

Francis Anthony Boyle (March 25, 1950 – January 30, 2025) was an American human rights lawyer and professor of international law at the University of Illinois College of Law. He served as counsel for Bosnia and Herzegovina and supported the rights of Palestinians and indigenous peoples.

== Early life, education and practice ==
Boyle was born in Chicago, Illinois, on March 25, 1950. He stated that he "was born Irish", and did not consider himself to be a "White North American". Boyle received a Bachelor of Arts in political science from the University of Chicago in 1971. He earned a Juris Doctor from Harvard Law School, magna cum laude in 1976 and Master of Arts and Doctor of Philosophy in political science from Harvard University in 1983. Boyle practiced tax and international tax law with Bingham, Dana & Gould.

== Background and legal work ==
Boyle served as counsel to Bosnia and Herzegovina and to the Provisional Government of the Palestinian Authority. He also represented two associations of citizens within Bosnia and was involved in developing the indictment against Slobodan Milošević for genocide, crimes against humanity, and war crimes in Bosnia and Herzegovina. Over his career, he has represented national and international bodies including the Blackfoot Nation (Canada), the Nation of Hawaii, and the Lakota Nation, as well as numerous individual death penalty and human rights cases. He has advised numerous international bodies in the areas of human rights, war crimes and genocide, nuclear policy, and bio-warfare. From 1991 to 1992, Boyle served as Legal Advisor to the Palestinian Delegation to the Middle East Peace Negotiations.

He served on the board of directors of Amnesty International, as a consultant to the American Friends Service Committee, and on the advisory board for the Council for Responsible Genetics. He drafted the US domestic implementing legislation for the Biological Weapons Convention, known as the Biological Weapons Anti-Terrorism Act of 1989, that was approved unanimously by both Houses of the US Congress and signed into law by President George H.W. Bush. He served as an adviser to the Palestine Liberation Organization (PLO) between 1987–89 and 1991–93.

== Activism and views ==
=== Amnesty International ===
As member of the board of Amnesty International USA at the end of the 1980s and early 1990s, he claimed that Amnesty International USA acted in ways closely related to United States foreign policy interests. He stated that Amnesty, along with other human rights organisations in the US, failed to sufficiently criticise the Sabra and Shatila Massacre in Lebanon. Boyle stated his suspicion that Amnesty International, which is headquartered in London, was also subject to this bias. He attributed alleged links between Amnesty International and Western foreign policy interests to the relatively large financial contribution of Amnesty International USA to AI's international budget, which he estimated at 20%. Boyle added that Amnesty International was instrumental in publicizing the "Iraqi soldiers dumping children from incubators in Kuwait" hoax. He claimed aspects of organizational continuity and survival came ahead of human rights aims in Amnesty International. He stated "Amnesty International is primarily motivated not by human rights but by publicity. Second comes money. Third comes getting more members. Fourth, internal turf battles. And then finally, human rights, genuine human rights concerns."

=== Bosnian genocide case ===
During the war for independence of Bosnia and Herzegovina, Boyle became the first international-law legal adviser to the first Bosnia-Herzegovinian president, Alija Izetbegovic. Boyle prepared and filed with the International Court of Justice Case 91, also known as the Bosnian genocide case, claiming that genocide took place in Bosnia and Herzegovina and that Serbia was responsible for and complicit in that genocide. The final verdict of the case in 2007 stated that while Serbia had not committed genocide, genocide indeed had taken place in Bosnia and Herzegovina and that Serbia was responsible for "failing to prevent and punish the genocide which it knew was taking place."

=== Transnational Government of Tamil Eelam ===
Boyle was one of the architects behind the "Freedom Charter" of the Transnational Government of Tamil Eelam (TGTE) following the end of the Sri Lankan Civil War having served as a member of the Advisory Committee on the formation of a Transnational Government of Tamil Eelam which was established "to explore the modalities for the establishment of a Transnational Government of Tamil Eelam, and to recommend the objectives that should be achieved by such a Transnational Government". He spoke at the inaugural session of the TGTE in May 2010.

=== COVID-19 conspiracy theories ===
Based on circumstantial evidence, Boyle claimed that SARS-CoV-2 is a genetically engineered bioweapon that escaped from a high-level lab in Wuhan, China, that was created in a B4 Lab at UNC Chapel Hill. The lab-leak theory was found to be unlikely by the World Health Organization (WHO) and researchers had not found evidence that the virus was created by genetic manipulation.

The lab leak theory has since gained traction after a CIA report commissioned by the Biden administration and former CIA director William Burns was declassified, suggesting this was the most likely source of Covid.

However, the agency officials have low confidence in any conclusion as there’s a lack of compelling evidence either way.

=== Domestic U.S. politics ===
==== Federal government of the United States ====
In October 1992, Boyle participated in the International Tribunal of Indigenous Peoples and Oppressed Nationalities in the United States of America that convened in San Francisco. Boyle, acting as a "special prosecutor", petitioned the tribunal to issue the following:

- "An Order proscribing the Federal Government of the United States of America as an International Criminal Conspiracy and a Criminal organization under the Nuremberg Charter, Judgment, and Principles;" and
- "an Order dissolving the Federal Government of the United States of America as a legal and political entity."

In the conclusion of a 37-point legal brief, Boyle wrote that the United States federal government was a hostis humani generis, and called on the tribunal to "condemn and repudiate" it and "its grotesque vision of a New World Order that is constructed upon warfare, bloodshed, violence, criminality, genocide, racism, colonialism, apartheid, massive violations of fundamental human rights, and the denial of the international legal right of self-determination" for indigenous peoples.

==== Hawaiian sovereignty movement ====
In 1993, Boyle gave a speech in which he called for Hawaiian independence from the United States.

In December 2004, Boyle stated that the United States is illegally occupying the state of Hawaii and he has encouraged Native Hawaiians to press for independence and, if necessary, unilaterally proclaim their own state. In a three-hour speech entitled "The Restoration of Hawaii's Independence", Boyle claimed that the United States has conceded it unlawfully occupied the Kingdom of Hawaii and that fact alone "gives the Kanaka Maoli (Native Hawaiians) the entitlement to restore their independent status as a sovereign nation state."

Boyle argued that, like the Palestinians, Hawaiians should "exercise their right of self-determination", instead of asking the permission for it. Boyle stated that "the plight of the Hawaiian people is generally well known in the world and there's a great deal of sympathy." He concluded his speech by stating that "Hawaii should send the strongest message to Washington it can. Letters carry no weight. The number of people in the street do. Gandhi threw the mighty British out of India with peaceful, nonviolent force. People power, submit to it."

Boyle, who advised Hawaiian independence groups from 1992, argued that "The legal cause for the restoration of the kingdom is air-tight". In addition to devising a draft constitution for one group, the Nation of Hawaii, Boyle filed suit in the United States Supreme Court in 1998 to demand the restoration of Hawaiian independence and reparations "for all the harm inflicted on the Kingdom of Hawaii". The court later determined that the kingdom "was a non-recognised sovereign that does not have access to the US courts". Boyle added that Hawaiian independence groups will "have to wait until the Kingdom of Hawaii has achieved substantial diplomatic recognition and then I could file something in the international court of justice." Boyle further stated that "Native Hawaiians operate in accordance with the Aloha spirit, which is similar to Mahatma Gandhi's Satyagraha force, and I take the position that if Gandhi can throw the mighty British Empire out of India with Satyagraha, Native Hawaiians can throw the mighty American empire out of Hawaii with Aloha." In a 2008 interview, Boyle restated his confidence that Hawaii will eventually achieve independence from the United States.

==== Administrations from 1992 ====
Boyle endorsed the impeachment of Bill Clinton, though not for the reasons stated in the Articles passed by the House of Representatives. Instead, Professor Boyle called on Clinton to be impeached for the "right reasons"—specifically: launching military attacks against Sudan, Afghanistan, and Iraq in violation of the War Powers Resolution and the U.S. Constitution.

Boyle appealed in January 2010 to the prosecutor of the International Criminal Court (ICC) to take action against George W. Bush and Dick Cheney among other members of the Bush administration. The United States does not recognize the jurisdiction of the ICC. In November 2011, Boyle was involved as a prosecutor in the four-day Kuala Lumpur War Crimes Tribunal in Malaysia, an organisation established by former Malaysian prime minister Mahathir Mohamad, an opponent of the Iraq War, to decide if President George W. Bush had violated international law. At the conclusion of the event, the two men were found guilty of committing war crimes.

In April 2018, Boyle gave a statement regarding Trump's missile strike in Syria, asserting that it was a violation of multiple charters and legal statutes, a crime against peace, and an illegal and impeachable offense. In a column, Boyle referred to Trump as "another representative for U.S. imperialism and neoliberal capitalism."

=== U.S. foreign policy since 9/11 ===
Boyle was critical of U.S. interventionist foreign policy, especially humanitarian intervention. He was a critic of the foreign policy of president George W. Bush. On September 13, 2001, two days after 9/11, Boyle appeared on The O'Reilly Factor to debate the legality of military action against Osama bin Laden and Afghanistan. While Bill O'Reilly pushed for immediate strikes, Boyle argued that "for an act of war, we need proof that a foreign state actually ordered or launched an attack upon the United States." He warned against rushing into war without evidence, recalling that "58,000 men of my generation were killed in Vietnam because of irresponsible behavior." When O'Reilly insisted on military action, Boyle rejected it as "vigilantism", asserting that the U.S. must "stand for the rule of law." In 2007, Boyle claimed that the G. W. Bush administration had been conducting criminal activities alongside associates in allied countries and that the administration would welcome conflict with Muslim and Arab states. He also claimed that American treatment of Muslims and Arabs since 9/11 was similar to that of the Japanese and Japanese Americans after Pearl Harbor.

==== Israel and Palestine ====
Boyle was a long-standing critic of Israel, Zionism, and American foreign policy towards Israel. In 1986, Boyle filed a lawsuit against Israeli General Amos Yaron for purported involvement in the Sabra and Shatila massacre on behalf of several relatives of victims, but lost when the United States State Department said that Yaron could not be tried due to the diplomatic immunity he enjoyed as a military attaché to the United States. Boyle countered that under the Nuremberg Principles, there are no privileges or immunities for suspected war criminals, but the court decided that since President Ronald Reagan had given Yaron a "formal certification" that "this was a political question and the court could not do anything to the contrary". Boyle has since followed all lawsuits against Israelis internationally, and blamed "Zionist control and domination of the American judiciary" for the failure of these lawsuits in the United States. Boyle proposed that the United Nations General Assembly set up the "International Criminal Tribunal for Israel" (ICTI) as a "subsidiary organ" under Article 22 of the United Nations Charter. His suggestion was endorsed in the UN by Malaysia and Iran, and supported by several dozen Arab and Muslim countries. An article in the June–July 2025 edition of the Washington Report on Middle East Affairs by one of Boyle's few friends outlined how he had fanatically (and unsuccessfully) attempted to prevent the Vatican under Pope John Paul II from extending diplomatic recognition to Israel, and cheered on the late Pope Francis' extension of the same recognition to the State of "Palestine" (https://www.wrmea.org/2025-june-july/my-francis-francis-a.-boyle.html)

Boyle advocated the creation of a Boycott, Divestment and Sanctions (BDS) movement in a speech on November 30, 2000, at Illinois State University in which Boyle called for "the establishment of a worldwide campaign of disinvestment/divestment against Israel" and has since campaigned for BDS. He referred to Israel's blockade of the Gaza Strip as "genocide", and the 2008–2009 Gaza War as a "massacre", claiming that Israel's actions raise the element in the Genocide Convention "of murder, torture, and things of that nature", and urged the Obama administration to force Israel to lift its blockade.

In January 2009, he wrote that "Israel's genocidal policy against the Palestinians has been unremitting, extending from before the very foundation of the State of Israel in 1948 ... Zionism's "final solution" to Israel's much touted "demographic threat" allegedly posed by the very existence of the Palestinians has always been genocide." Following the Gaza War, he advised Palestinian Authority President Mahmoud Abbas to file a declaration under Article 12, Paragraph 3 of the Rome Statute, requesting the prosecution of Israeli officials.

===== Prediction of the collapse of Israel =====
In an article published by Veterans Today in 2010 titled "The Impending Collapse of Israel", Boyle stated that "God had no right to steal Palestine from the Palestinians and give Palestine to the Jews to begin with. A fortiori the United Nations had no right to steal Palestine from the Palestinians and give Palestine to the Zionists in 1947." In the same article, Boyle predicted that the state of Israel "will continue its rapid descent into pariah state status" and that "When Israel collapses, most Zionists will have already left or will soon leave for other states around the world. The Palestinians will then be able to claim all of the historic Mandate for Palestine as their State, including the entire City of Jerusalem as their Capital."

According to Boyle, "the Jewish Bantustan (will) collapse of its own racist and genocidal weight over the next two decades if not much sooner. In the meantime, the Palestinians must stall and delay the so-called peace negotiations until then. Time is on their side."

===== "Jewistan" =====
In an article published by the Atlantic Free Press, in October 2010, Boyle suggested that Israel change its name to "Jewistan – The State of the Jews", claiming:

In fact, Israel has never been anything but a Bantustan for Jews set up in the Middle East by the White racist and genocidal Western colonial imperial powers in order to serve as their racist attack dog and genocidal enforcer against the Arab and Muslim world. From the very moment of Western imperialism's genocidal conception of Israel in 1947–1948, Israel has historically always functioned as Jewistan – the world's Bantustan for the Jews. So Israel might as well finally change its name today to Jewistan, own up to its racist birthright, and make it official for the rest of the world to acknowledge.

He concluded the article by stating: "In the meantime, the Palestinians should sign nothing with Jewistan/Israel and let this Bantustan for Jews collapse of its own racist and genocidal weight. Good riddance!"

==== Iran ====
In May 2008, Boyle offered to "represent Iran in an international tribunal for trying Israel on charges of genocide of Palestinians", and reportedly demanded that his proposal be submitted to Ayatollah Seyyed Ali Khamenei and President Mahmoud Ahmadinejad.

Boyle urged Iran to sue the United States in the International Court of Justice to discourage a military strike on Iran's nuclear facilities and prevent the imposition of new sanctions by the U.N. Security Council. He offered to represent Iran and recommended that Iran begin drafting lawsuits for presentation to the International Court of Justice.

==== Ireland and the Great Famine ====
Boyle supported the concept of a United Ireland, advocating for a "peaceful decolonization" of Northern Ireland. Against mainstream scholarship, Boyle has claimed that the Great Famine in Ireland constituted a "genocide" under the Genocide Convention. Irish historian Liam Kennedy criticized Boyle's claim, writing that:

The evidence for genocidal intent, however, is merely a string of quotations from a small number historians of Ireland, principally Christine Kinealy and the late Cecil Woodham-Smith. Most of the voluminous literature on the Famine is simply ignored. Neither is there any apparent attempt to engage with primary source materials or undertake original archival research. The style of writing is self-referential, and the quotations are not used in a systematic way to an argument for deliberate intent.

== Death ==
Boyle died in Urbana, Illinois, on January 30, 2025, at the age of 74.

== Books ==
- —— (1985). World Politics and International Law. Durham N.C.: Duke University Press. ISBN 0-8223-0609-3. OCLC 11784378.
- —— (1999). Foundations of World Order: The Legalist Approach to International Relations, 1898–1922. Durham N.C.: Duke University Press. ISBN 978-0822323648.
- —— (2002). The criminality of nuclear deterrence. Atlanta, GA: Clarity Press. ISBN 0-932863-33-7. OCLC 50007944.
- —— (2003). Palestine, Palestinians and International Law. Atlanta, GA: Clarity Press. ISBN 978-0932863379.
- —— (2004). Destroying World Order: US Imperialism in the Middle East Before and After September 11. Clarity Press. ISBN 9780932863409.
- —— (2005). Biowarfare and Terrorism. Atlanta, GA: Clarity Press. ISBN 978-0932863461.
- —— (2007). Protesting Power: War, Resistance and Law. Lanham, MD: Rowman & Littlefield Publishers. ISBN 978-0742538924.
- —— (2008). Breaking All The Rules: Palestine, Iraq, Iran and the Case for Impeachment. Atlanta, GA: Clarity Press. ISBN 978-0932863591.
- —— (2009). Tackling America's Toughest Questions: Alternative Media Interviews. Atlanta, GA: Clarity Press. ISBN 978-0932863621.
- —— (2011). The Palestinian Right of Return Under International Law. Atlanta, GA: Clarity Press. ISBN 978-0932863935.
- —— (2012). United Ireland, Human Rights and International Law. Atlanta, GA: Clarity Press. ISBN 978-0983353928.
- —— (2013). Destroying Libya and World Order: The Three-Decade U.S. Campaign to Terminate the Qaddafi Revolution. Atlanta, GA: Clarity Press. ISBN 978-0985335373.
- —— (2016). The Tamil Genocide by Sri Lanka: The Global Failure to Protect Tamil Rights Under International Law. Atlanta, GA: Clarity Press. ISBN 978-0-9860853-7-6.
