= People for Equality and Relief in Lanka =

American human rights organization

- Formation: 2005
- Type: Human Rights
- Headquarters: Washington DC, United States
- Website: People for Equality and Relief in Lanka

People for Equality and Relief in Lanka (PEARL) is a human rights organization formed in 2005 in the United States to address human rights issues affecting Tamil civilians in Sri Lanka. It conducts field research and publishes reports on issues such as accountability, militarization and transitional justice. It seeks to engage the international community to improve human rights in Sri Lanka. It was founded by human rights lawyer Tasha Manoranjan. Its current Executive Director is Madura Rasaratnam, an Associate Professor of Comparative Politics at City, University of London. Its members have published in outlets such as Al Jazeera, The Korea Times and Just Security, and its works have been cited in scholarly publications.
