= The Tamil Genocide by Sri Lanka =

Book by Francis Boyle

- Author: Francis Boyle
- Language: English
- Genre: Non-fiction
- Publisher: Clarity Press
- Publication date: 2009
- Pages: 139
- ISBN: 9780932863706

The Tamil Genocide by Sri Lanka: The Global Failure to Protect Tamil Rights Under International Law is a book by Francis Boyle on the final stages of the Sri Lankan Civil War, Tamil genocide and its war crimes. The United Nations, which has acknowledged its calamitous failures under the Responsibility to Protect doctrine, is still trying to tally the numbers and apportion the blame, four years on: 40,000 to 70,000 Tamil civilians killed over five months of the final conflagration, the number the UN now accepts, though many argue the figure is far higher.
