= Pazha Nedumara =

Indian politician

Pazha Nedumaran
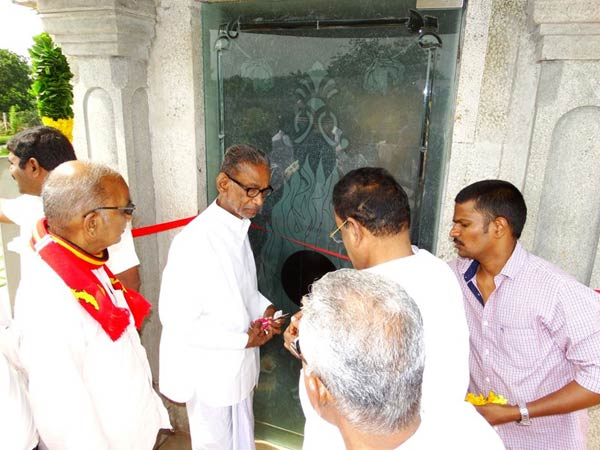
- Born: Krishnan Pillai. Pazhaniyappan; 10 March 1933 (age 93); Madurai, Tamil Nadu, India
- Occupations: Politician, writer, activist
- Known for: Founder of Ulaka Tamilar Peramaippu(World Tamil Confederation) and Tamil Nadu Kamaraj Congress; President of Tamils National Movement & Tamil Eelam Liberation Supporters Co-ordination Committee

Pazha Nedumaran Krishnan Pillai Pazhaniyappan (Tamil: பழ. நெடுமாறன்/கிருஷ்ணன் பிள்ளை பழநியப்பன்) is an Indian politician from the state of Tamil Nadu, India. He is an ex-national Congressman, a writer and Tamil nationalist, who has authored many books in Tamil and English.

He is the editor-in-chief of the by-weekly Tamil magazine Then Seidi (Tamil: தென் செய்தி). He is the leader of the Tamil Nationalist Movement and the இலங்கைத் தமிழர் பாதுகாப்பு இயக்க ஒருங்கிணைப்பாளர்.

== Personal life ==
Pazha Nedumaran was born in Madurai. He graduated from The American College in Madurai. He was a close associate of K. Kamaraj, and had met Indira Gandhi a couple of times in the company of K. Kamaraj. He was reportedly disillusioned with the Congress after Kamaraj's demise.

His son Palani Kumanan is a software engineer in The Wall Street Journal and shared the Pulitzer Prize for 2015.

== Socio-political activities ==
=== Political ===
Nedumaran, who started his political career in 1969, was previously associated with the Indian National Congress party. Later on, he founded his own political party, named Tamil Nadu Kamaraj Congress (TNKC), with the aim of advocating for the welfare of Tamils.

=== Human Rights ===
- When Kannada film actor Dr. Rajkumar was abducted by the notorious dacoit Veerappan, there arose a tense situation in the adjoining states of Tamil Nadu and Karnataka. The situation was such that at any time racial riots could break out resulting in arson and killings of thousands and thousands of innocent people. As such, on the requisition by the Chief Ministers of both states, a team of emissaries led by Nedumaran, went into the forests, met Veerappan and rescued Dr. Rajkumar.
- 2007, he organised a campaign to collect food and medicines for the people starving in Jaffna, due to the economic blockade of the Sri Lankan Government. Aids worth Rs. 10 million were collected. He sought the help of the Indian Red Cross Society to send the aid to Jaffna. Indian Red Cross Society readily agreed and in turn sought the permission of the Indian Government to carry the aids. But the Indian Government did not respond for more than 10 months. Nedumaran demonstrated several agitations seeking the Indian Government to grant permission. As all were in vain, he announced that he and his comrades would carry the aids to Jaffna by boats from Rameshwaram and Nagapattinam, the coastal towns of Tamil Nadu. The Tamil Nadu Police stopped him from doing so. Hence he undertook a fast-unto-death until a solution was attained for this issue. The fast lasted for 4 days and after the assurance from the Chief Minister of Tamil Nadu through Dr. Ramadoss, Convener, PMK, he completed the fast.

=== Tamil Eelam ===
- 1985, Nedumaran made a secret tour in the Tamil areas of Sri Lanka, and video graphed the atrocities committed by the Sri Lanka army there; and documented the consequences of the atrocities. He then toured the world with this evidence, and brought global attention to the issue.
