= Mullivaikkal massacre =

2009 massacre in the Sri Lankan Civil War

- Part of Sri Lankan civil war and Tamil Genocide
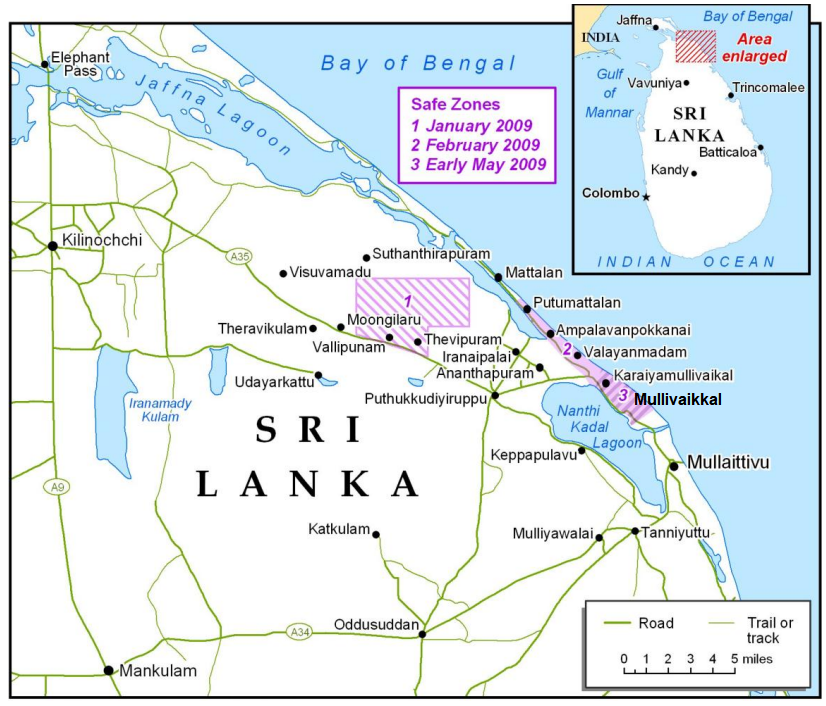
- No-Fire Zones (NFZs) in 2009, which became primary sites of civilian massacres by Sri Lanka Armed Forces and Liberation Tigers of Tamil Eelam
- Native name: முள்ளிவாய்க்கால் படுகொலைகள் මුල්ලිවයික්කාල් සමූල ඝාතනය
- Location: 9°17′45″N 80°48′10″E; Mullivaikkal, Mullaitivu District, Vanni, Northern Province, Sri Lanka.
- Date: 2009
- Target: Sri Lankan Tamils
- Attack type: Terror bombing, Indiscriminate shelling, Mass shooting
- Deaths: 40,000 - 70,000 (January-May 2009)
- Perpetrators: Sri Lanka Armed Forces, Liberation Tigers of Tamil Eelam

The Mullivaikkal massacre was the mass killing of tens of thousands of Sri Lankan Tamils in 2009 during the closing stages of the Sri Lankan Civil War, which ended in May 2009 in a tiny strip of land in Mullivaikkal, Mullaitivu.

The Sri Lankan government had designated no-fire zones in the Vanni region towards the end of the war. According to the UN, between 40,000 and 70,000 entrapped Tamil civilians were killed by the actions of government forces and Liberation Tigers of Tamil Eelam (LTTE), with the large majority of these civilian deaths being the result of indiscriminate shelling by the Sri Lankan Armed Forces. During the battle, government forces heavily shelled the area, including hospitals, the UN hub, and near the Red Cross ship, while the LTTE held hostage much of the civilian population for cover, and enforced this by shooting escaping Tamil civilians.

During the final days of the war, the army also engaged in indiscriminate executions of Tamils, civilians as well as fighters. Indiscriminate massacres of civilians were carried out on 18 May 2009.

The UN Panel Report describes how "from as early as 6 February 2009, the SLA continuously shelled within the area that became the second NFZ, from all directions, including land, air and sea. It is estimated that there were between 300,000 and 330,000 civilians in that small area. The SLA assault employed aerial bombardment, long-range artillery, howitzers and MBRLs as well as small mortars, RPGs and small arms fire, some of it fired from a close range. MBRLs when using unguided rockets are area saturation weapons and when used in densely populated areas, are indiscriminate with potential to cause large numbers of casualties.

The UN Panel Report describes the actions of the LTTE, "In spite of the futility of their military situation, the LTTE not only refused to surrender, but also continued to prevent civilians from leaving the area, ensuring their continued presence as a human buffer. It forced civilians to help build military installations and fortifications or undertake other forced labour. It also intensified its practice of forced recruitment, including of children, to swell their dwindling ranks. As LTTE recruitment increased, parents actively resisted, and families took increasingly desperate measures to protect their children from recruitment. They hid their children in secret locations or forced them into early arranged marriages. LTTE cadre would beat relatives or parents, sometimes severely, if they tried to resist the recruitment. All these approaches, many of them aimed at defending the LTTE and its leadership, portrayed callousness to the desperate plight of civilians and a willingness to sacrifice their lives."

== See also ==
- Fighting in the No Fire Zone
- Tamil genocide
- War crimes during the final stages of the Sri Lankan Civil War
