= Mullivaikkal Remembrance Day =

Remembrance day observed by Sri Lankan Tamils (May 18)

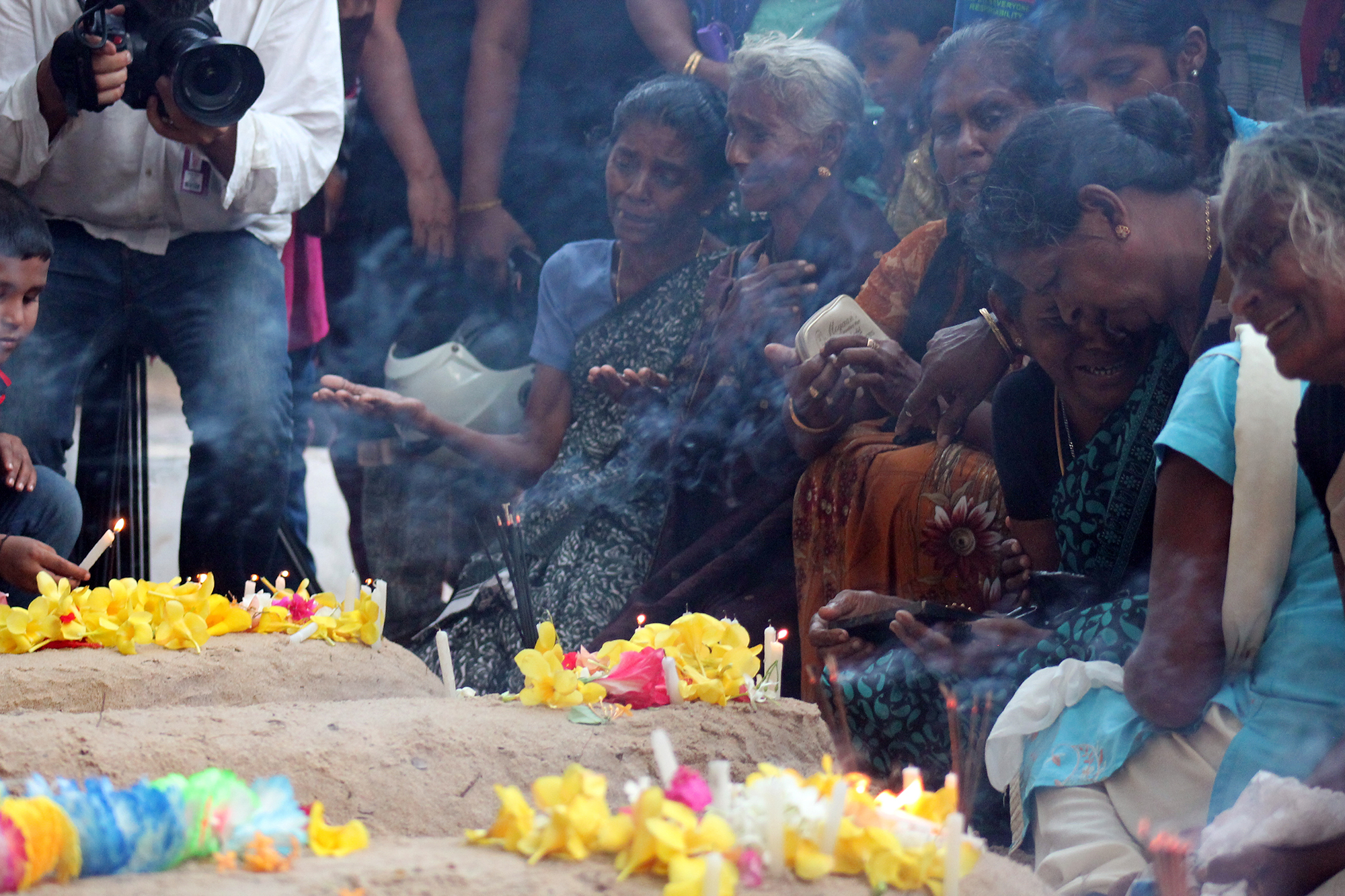
- Tamil women and children seen grieving in Mullivaikkal (2016)
- Official name: முள்ளிவாய்க்கால் நினைவு நாள்
- Also called: Tamil Genocide Remembrance Day
- Observed by: Sri Lankan Tamils
- Significance: End of the Sri Lankan Civil War and to commemorate the war dead
- Date: 18 May
- Next time: 18 May 2027
- Frequency: Annual
- Related to: Remembrance Day

Mullivaikkal Remembrance Day (or simply Mullivaikkal Day; Tamil: முள்ளிவாய்க்கால் நினைவு நாள் Muḷḷivāykkāl Niṉaivu Nāḷ) is a remembrance day observed by Sri Lankan Tamils to remember those who were killed during the final stages of the Sri Lankan Civil War. It is held each year on 18 May, the date on which the civil war ended in 2009, and is named after Mullivaikkal, a village on the northeastern coast of Sri Lanka which was the scene of the final battle of the civil war and the site of the Mullivaikkal massacre.

== History ==
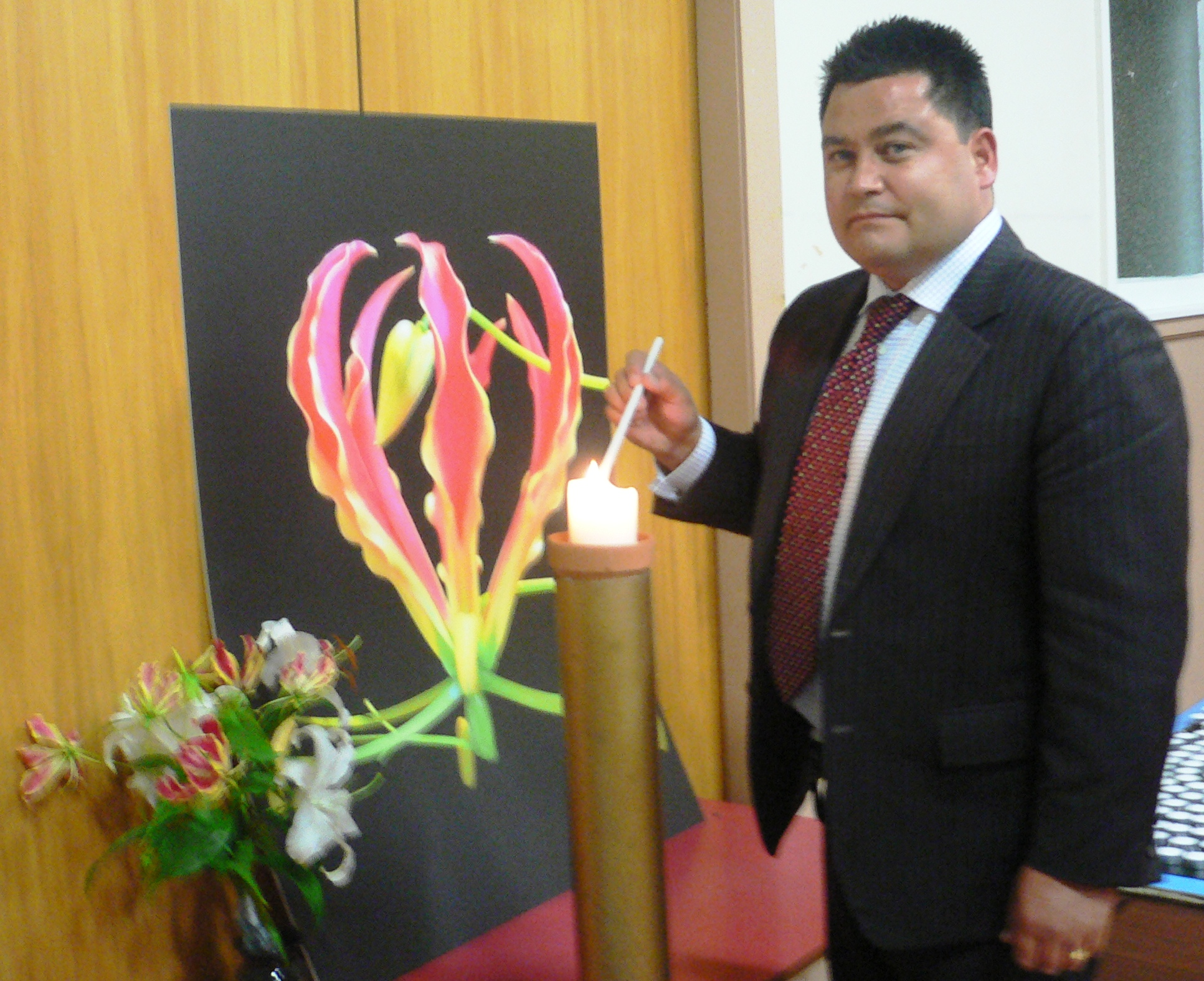
Labour Party MP Charles Chauvel lighting a candle on Mullivaikkal Remembrance Day 2010 in Wellington, New Zealand

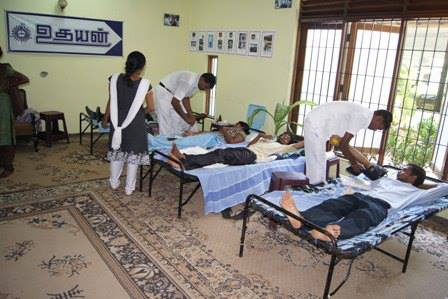
Uthayan staff donating blood on Mullivaikkal Remembrance Day 2013 in Jaffna, Sri Lanka

The Sri Lankan Civil War was an armed conflict where the Liberation Tigers of Tamil Eelam (LTTE) led an insurgency against the Sri Lankan government to create an independent state in the Tamil-majority northeastern regions of Sri Lanka called Tamil Eelam. By 2007, the civil war had cost an estimated 70,000 lives. Amongst those killed, Sri Lankan Tamils alone made up a total of 54,053 deaths and 25,266 Sri Lankan Tamils went missing or "disappeared". The final months of the civil war, between late 2008 and early 2009, witnessed particularly brutal fighting between the Sri Lanka Army and the LTTE. Around 300,000 civilians were trapped between the two sides. Both sides committed and were accused of major human rights violations.

The civil war ended on 18 May 2009 with the killing of Velupillai Prabhakaran, founder and leader of the LTTE. A United Nations report found that as many as 40,000 Tamil civilians may have been killed in the final months of the civil war, mostly as a result of indiscriminate shelling by the Sri Lankan military. There are widespread allegations that both sides committed atrocities and human rights violations, including war crimes. The Office of the United Nations High Commissioner for Human Rights is currently investigating the alleged war crimes.

=== Commemoration banned ===
The Sri Lankan government, which formerly declared 18 May as Victory Day, celebrates the day with military parades. The day is also a commemoration for dead military personnel who are celebrated as "war heroes". However, there was no official commemoration for the thousands of Tamil civilians killed in the civil war despite the government's own Lessons Learnt and Reconciliation Commission recommending that all citizens killed during the war be commemorated on National Day (4 February). Instead, the government has virtually banned Tamils from commemorating their war dead. In the run up to 18 May, security is tightened in the Tamil-majority Northern and Eastern provinces and schools and universities are closed to prevent any public commemoration.

The government and its security forces regard any commemoration by Tamils to be commemoration of the LTTE, not civilians. The security forces claim that Tamils may commemorate dead LTTE members in private but there have been reports of the military entering homes to prevent commemoration.

Under the presidency of Mahinda Rajapaksa, 18 May was known as Victory day, but when Maithripala Sirisena came to power in 2015 the date was renamed as Remembrance day. The date was also moved to 19 May.

== Commemorations ==
Despite the security restrictions, Tamils in Sri Lanka hold small events on 18 May, which they call Mullivaikkal Remembrance Day, to commemorate those killed. Public commemorations are dealt with harshly by Sri Lankan security forces, and Sri Lankan Tamil politicians have been arrested for commemorating Mullivaikkal Remembrance Day.

In the Indian state of Tamil Nadu, political parties, youth organizations, and social movement groups organize a number of remembrance events across the state.

Amongst the Sri Lankan Tamil diaspora, where there are no restrictions on commemorating Mullivaikkal Remembrance Day, large public gatherings are held.

In 2022, the Parliament of Canada adopted a motion to mark May 18 as Tamil Genocide Remembrance Day. In 2023, Mayor of Brampton Patrick Brown commemorated Tamil Genocide Remembrance Day with a ground breaking for a Tamil Genocide monument to be built in the city of Brampton.

== See also ==
- Maaveerar Naal
- Mullivaikal Muttram
