= Mullivaikkal =

Mullivaikkal முள்ளிவாய்க்கால்
- Village
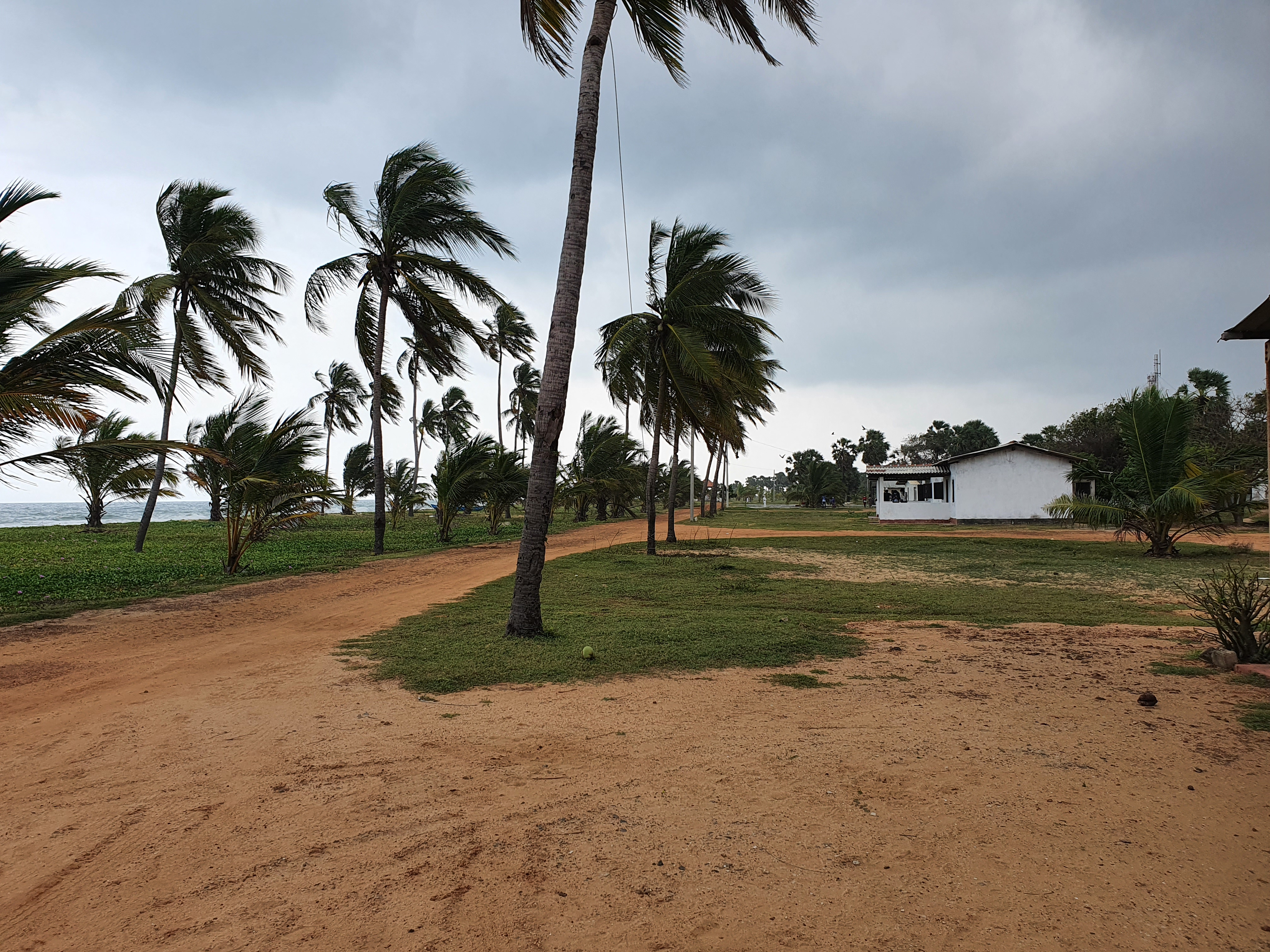
- Mullivaikkal Beach

- Location within Northern Province
- Coordinates: 9°17′45″N 80°48′10″E
- Country: Sri Lanka
- Province: Northern Province
- District: Mullaitivu District
- Time zone: UTC+5:30 (Sri Lanka Standard Time Zone)

Mullivaikkal (Mu’l’livaaykkaal, Muḷḷivāykkāl) is a village located in Mullaitivu District, Vanni, Northern Province, Sri Lanka. The Mullivaikkal Massacre took place here in the final days of the Sri Lankan Civil War.
