= Kaduwela Municipal Council =

Local council of Kaduwela, Sri Lanka

Kaduwela Municipal Council: කඩුවෙල මහා නගර සභාව (Sinhala); கடுவேலா மாநகர சபை (Tamil)

Type
- Type: Local authority
- Houses: Unicameral

History
- Founded: 2011; 15 years ago
- Preceded by: Kaduwela Divisional Council

Leadership
- Mayor: Ranjan Jayalal Perera, NPP since 2025
- Deputy Mayor: Sreenith Jayagoda Arachchi, NPP since 2025

Structure
- Seats: 47
- Political groups: Government (26): National People's Power (26); Opposition (21): Independent Group (8); Samagi Jana Balawegaya (5); United National Party (3); Sri Lanka Podujana Peramuna (2); Sarvajana Balaya (1); National Freedom Front (1); People's Alliance (1)

Elections
- Voting system: Open list proportional representation system
- Last election: 6 May 2025
- Next election: TBD

Meeting place
- Kaduwela Municipal Council building, New Kandy Road, Kaduwela

Website
- http://www.kaduwela.mc.gov.lk

The Kaduwela Municipal Council (Sinhala: කඩුවෙල මහා නගර සභාව, Tamil: கடுவேலா மாநகர சபை) is the local council for Kaduwela, a city in Colombo District, Sri Lanka. At the end of 2016, the area was reported to have a population of 260,341.

== Wards ==
Wards in Kaduwela Municipal Council
Division	Ward	GN Division
Kaduwela	Welivita	Welivita
Kaduwela	Welivita	Mahadeniya
Kaduwela	Hewagama	Hewagama
Kaduwela	Hewagama	Raggahawatta
Kaduwela	Kaduwela	Kaduwela
Kaduwela	Kaduwela	Kothalawala
Kaduwela	Bomiriya North	Ihala Bomiriya
Kaduwela	Bomiriya North	Pahala Bomiriya A
Kaduwela	Bomiriya South	Pahala Bomiriya B
Kaduwela	Nawagamuwa	Nawagamuwa
Kaduwela	Nawagamuwa	Wekewatta
Kaduwela	Ranala	Ranala
Kaduwela	Ranala	Nawagamuwa South
Kaduwela	Dadigamuwa	Dedigamuwa
Kaduwela	Dadigamuwa	Embiladeniya
Kaduwela	Dadigamuwa	Welpillewa
Kaduwela	Malambe North	Malambe North
Kaduwela	Malabe	Malabe East
Kaduwela	Malabe	Malabe South
Battaramulla	Talahena	Thalahena North
Battaramulla	Talahena	Thalahena South
Battaramulla	Talahena	Thalangama North B
Battaramulla	Muttettugoda	Muttettugoda
Battaramulla	Talangama	Thalangama North A
Battaramulla	Walpola	Walpola
Battaramulla	Kalapaluwawa	Kalapaluwawa
Battaramulla	Kalapaluwawa	Kotuwegoda
Battaramulla	Battaramulla	Battaramulla North
Battaramulla	Battaramulla	Battaramulla South
Battaramulla	Battaramulla	Subothipura
Battaramulla	Battaramulla	Rajamalwatta
Battaramulla	Battaramulla	Udumulla
Battaramulla	Pelawatte	Asiri Uyana
Battaramulla	Pelawatte	Pahalawela
Battaramulla	Batapota	Batapotha
Battaramulla	Batapota	Aruppitiya
Battaramulla	Jayawadanagama	Jayawadanagama
Battaramulla	Jayawadanagama	Kumaragewatta
Battaramulla	Jayawadanagama	Wickramasinghapura
Battaramulla	Pothurawa	Pothurawa
Athurugiriya	Koratota	Koratota
Athurugiriya	Pore	Pore
Athurugiriya	Pore	Thandahena
Athurugiriya	Wellangiriya	Wellangiriya
Athurugiriya	Wellangiriya	Evarihena
Athurugiriya	Arangala	Arangala
Athurugiriya	Arangala	Hokandara North
Athurugiriya	Hokandara	Hokandara East
Athurugiriya	Hokandara	Hokandara South
Athurugiriya	Boralugoda	Boralugoda
Athurugiriya	Boralugoda	Thaldiyawela
Athurugiriya	Athurugiriya	Athurugiriya
Athurugiriya	Athurugiriya	Athurugiriya South
Athurugiriya	Oruwala	Oruwala
Athurugiriya	Oruwala	Shanthalokagama
Athurugiriya	Bomiriya South	Welihinda
Athurugiriya	Ranala	Batewela

== Demographics ==
In 2016, the population numbered 260,341 and the council had 184,026 electors registered.

=== Ethnic groups ===
Population by Ethnicity (2014)
1. Sinhalese (95.6%)
2. Tamils (1.86%)
3. Sri Lankan Moors (1.35%)
4. Burghers (0.49%)
5. Sri Lankan Malays (0.49%)
6. Other (0.17%)

Population by Ethnicity (2014)
Ethnicity	Population	% Of Total
Sinhalese	251,009	95.64
Tamils	4,876	1.86
Sri Lankan Moors	3,550	1.35
Burgher	1,295	0.49
Sri Lankan Malays	1,282	0.49
Other	445	0.17
Total	262,456	100.00

=== Religion ===
Population by Religion (2014)
1. Buddhism (91.0%)
2. Roman Catholic (5.22%)
3. Islam (1.97%)
4. Hinduism (1.35%)
5. Other (0.44%)

Population by Religion (2014)
Religion	Population	% Of Total
Bhuddhism	238,895	91.01
Roman Catholic	13,697	5.22
Islam	5,160	1.97
Hinduism	3,546	1.35
Other	1,158	0.44
Total	262,456	100.00

== Representation ==
The Kaduwela Municipal Council is represented by 48 councillors, elected using an open list proportional representation system.

=== 2025 local elections ===
Results of the 2025 Sri Lankan local elections held on 6 May 2025.

Alliances and parties	Votes	%	Seats
National People's Power	60,537	53.46%	26
Independent Group	19,455	17.18%	8
Samagi Jana Balawegaya	12,571	11.10%	5
United National Party	6,667	5.89%	3
Sri Lanka Podujana Peramuna	4,676	4.13%	2
Sarvajana Balaya	3,668	3.24%	1
National Freedom Front	2,422	2.14%	1
People's Alliance	1,227	1.08%	1
United Republican Front	1,176	1.04%	0
National Peoples Party	364	0.32%	0
People's Struggle Alliance	341	0.30%	0
Jana Setha Peramuna	129	0.11%	0
Valid votes	113,233	98.25%	47
Rejected votes	2,022	1.75%	
Total polled	115,255	100.00%	
Registered electors/turnout	204,547	56.35%	

=== 2018 local elections ===
Results of the 2018 Sri Lankan local elections held on 10 February 2018.

Alliances and parties	Votes	%	Seats
Sri Lanka Podujana Peramuna	71,016	51.79%	26
United National Party	31,429	22.92%	11
United People's Freedom Alliance	15,549	11.34%	5
Janatha Vimukthi Peramuna	15,071	10.99%	5
Independent Group 1	1,045	0.76%	1
Independent Group 3	873	0.64%	0
National People's Party	807	0.59%	0
Socialist Party of Sri Lanka	639	0.47%	0
Independent Group 4	423	0.31%	0
Jana Setha Peramuna	152	0.11%	0
Independent Group 2	111	0.08%	0
Valid votes	137,115	98.20%	48
Rejected votes	2,509	1.80%	
Total polled	139,624	100.00%	
Registered electors/turnout	183,889	75.92%	

=== 2011 local elections ===
Results of the 2011 Sri Lankan local elections held on 17 and 23 July and 10 August 2011.

Alliances and parties	Votes	%	Seats
United People's Freedom Alliance	59,987	66.80%	20
United National Party	24,897	27.72%	7
Janatha Vimukthi Peramuna	3,709	4.13%	1
Jana Setha Peramuna	1,142	1.27%	0
Independent Group	68	0.08%	0
Valid votes	89,803	95.47%	28
Rejected votes	4,264	4.53%	
Total polled	94,067	100.00%	
Registered electors/turnout	163,829	57.42%	
