= Godagama =

Godagama ගොඩගම கொடகம
- Suburb
- Country: Sri Lanka
- Province: Western Province
- Time zone: UTC+5:30 (Sri Lanka Standard Time)

Godagama is a town close to city of Colombo Sri Lanka. It is located in Colombo District within the Western Province, Sri Lanka.

Godagama is located on the High Level road at the main junction of the Avissawella to Colombo (A4) road and the Padukka to Borella (B242) road. Godagama falls within the Homagama electorate and Homagama divisional secretariat which is the largest population divisional secretariat in Sri Lanka (local government authority).

== Nearby cities ==
To the West - Homagama, Kottawa, Pannipitiya, Maharagama. To the East - Padukka, Hanwella. To the North- Athurugiriya, Malabe, Battaramulla, Kaduwela and to the South Pitipana, Meegoda

== Transport ==
Railway: Kelani valley line

Bus routes heading through Godagama Town:

- 69/122 - Maharagama - Kandy
- 18/122 Hatton
- 78/122 Nawalapitiya
- 98/122 Ampara
- 99 - Colombo - Badulla - Welimada - Passara - Balangoda - Bandarawela
- 122 - Colombo - Avissawella - Ratnapura - Embilipitiya - Suriyawewa - Rakwana
- 124 - Maharagama - Ihala Bope
- 125 - Pettah - Padukka - Ingiriya
- 128/2 - Homagama - Pansala Handiya
- 138 - Godagama - Pettah
- 190 - Meegoda - Pettah (via Malabe)
- 219 - Homagama - Hanwella (via Meegoda)
- 293 - Homagama - Hanwella (via Panagoda)
- 299 - Homagama - Lenegala
- 299/2 - Homagama - Nagasgodalla (Via Lional Jayasinge Mawatha)
- 366 - Homagama - Halbarawa

== See also ==
- List of towns in Western Province, Sri Lanka
