= Western Region Megapolis =

Urban planning region of Sri Lanka

The Western Province where most of the Megapolis is situated

The Western Region Megapolis is an urban planning, zoning, and development area stretching from Negombo in the north to Beruwala in the south. It is designed to create a megapolis in Sri Lanka's Western Province by 2030.

The plan was created by Surbana in cooperation with local experts. It hopes to create a Megacity that can match other economic hubs, such as Dubai, Singapore, Seoul and Tokyo, and solve the issues of traffic congestion, garbage, slums, and environmental pollution. The project aims to foster economic growth and prosperity, good governance, the creation of an efficient and well-planned region, social equity and harmony, and environmental sustainability. The project includes social infrastructure development such as housing, healthcare, education, spiritual development, safety and security, transportation and traffic management, airport and port development, water- and energy-related infrastructure development, and the development of SMEs, industries and tourism.

== History ==
The concept was initially mooted in 1991 by the then young Sri Lankan Industries' Science and Technology Minister Ranil Wickremesinghe. He presented the plan to the visiting Japanese Prime Minister Toshiki Kaifu, with the objective of getting Japanese assistance to implement the project. However, development of the concept came to a halt with the change of the government in 1994. In 2004, the Singaporean Housing and Development Board's design subsidiary CESMA created the Western Region Megapolis plan. When Wickremesinghe returned to power and the proposal was submitted to the Board of Investment (BOI), however, the end of the administration again stopped the project. His successor Mahinda Rajapaksa mostly abandoned the plan but implemented piecemeal sections of the project.

After returning to power in 2015, Wickremasinghe requested Surbana Jurong, the successor of CESMA, to revise the plan to suit the newer needs. The Megapolis plan was unveiled in a ceremony with Prime Minister Wickremesighe, President Maithripala Sirisena, and Megapolis and Western Province Development Minister Champika Ranawaka. In 2016 Siemens signed an MoU with the Ministry of Megapolis to provide solutions for smart cities.

== Notable Developments ==
=== Colombo International Financial City ===
The Colombo International Financial City (CIFC) is a planned offshore city adjacent to Galle Face Green in Central Colombo that would be built on reclaimed land. It is touted as an international financial center and is funded by Chinese investment; the city will have a separate legal and financial system which is likely to be governed by the Chinese firms that control the land, although the Supreme Court of Sri Lanka still has the final word on legal matters.

== Transport ==
The megapolis project has several transport development proposals. The Plans include modernized bus service, an electrified railway system, a modern rapid transit system, and an inland water transport system for a new boat/ferry service that uses Colombo's historic canal network, a new urban expressway system, and improvements to existing roadways. Transport-related related projects identified by the master plan of Western Region Megapolis Planning Project are implemented under the Transport Development Project (TBD). The Western Region Megapolis Transport Masterplan has published the detailed plan.

A new rail-based Rapid Transit System will be introduced in the Greater Colombo area. Bus, taxi and school transport systems in the region will be restructured and modernized. Bus stations and terminals will be upgraded. A transport information and analysis center is proposed in the project master plan.

=== Railways ===
Upgrading stations, rail tracks and signaling, communication and ticketing systems, and the introduction of new rolling stock have been proposed. Electrification of existing lines and several new lines are also proposed in the project. The main lines to be modernized and electrified are:

1. Panadura – Veyangoda – Polgahawela (RL-M1) -110 km
2. Kelani Valley Line (RL-M3) -60 km
3. Ragama to Negombo line with additional new airport access (RL-M2) -26 km
4. Kottawa to Horana (RL-NR1) –22 km
5. Kelaniya to Kosgama via Biyagama and Dompe (RL-NR2) - 30 km

The first three lines already exist while the last two are proposed to be added to the net work in the future. The feasibility study on the Panadura–Veyangoda line has been proposed under the Colombo Suburban Railway Project under ADB assistance and in April 2016 the Ministry of Transport shortlisted the consultants for the feasibility study.

The introduction of maglev high-speed rail has been proposed by the High Speed Railway Corporation (HSRC). It would connect Negombo in the north to Kollupitiya in the south.

=== Rapid Transit ===
The plan proposes a Light Rail Transit (LRT) system serving the designated Western Region Megapolis area within the Colombo District. The project will consist of seven elevated and surface-level tracks to cover major public institutions in the city and the suburbs. The Japan International Cooperation Agency agreed to fund the project and is assisting with the feasibility study. In 2017, various consulting services expressed interests in feasibility studies. In November 2017, the Ministry of Megapolis and Western Development signed with a South Korean company, Seoyoung Engineering, to begin a feasibility study of the project. The planned construction in Colombo and its suburbs began in late 2018.

The project is to be carried out in seven phases. The first phase would see the Light Rail system running from Malabe to Fort, with all seven phases covering a total distance of 75 km. The seven phases are listed below:

1. Green Line (RTS1) - 15 km - Fort – Kollupitiya – Bambalapitiya – Borella – Union Place – Maradana
2. Yellow Line (RTS2) - 11.5 km - Fort – Maradana – Mattakkuliya and Peliyagoda
3. Red Line (RTS3) - 10 km - Dematagoda – Borella – Narahenpita – Kirulapana – Havelock City – Bambalapitiya
4. Purple Line (RTS4) - 10 km - Borella – Rajagiriya – Battaramulla – Malabe
5. Pink Line (RTS5) - 9.6 km - Malabe to Kottawa
6. Olive Line (RTS6) - 6 km - Malabe to Kaduwela
7. Ash Line (RTS7) - 13 km - Peliyagoda to Kadawatha

=== Bus ===
The plan envisions revising the route network to enhance efficiency and convenience, reform and restructure public bus service and institutions, initiate express bus services using intercity expressways, deploy smart bus service with low floor kneeling, air conditioning, and on-board IT, and improve facilities at suburban bus terminals and stands.

The Lotus Tower was touted as the modular hub for a citywide bus service during its construction, although the accompanying monorail service has been replaced with LRT and little information has been released about the future of the bus service.

=== Waterways ===
There will be new boat services to enhance west-west connectivity and to promote eco-tourism during night hours. Three main routes have been identified:

- Wellawatta – Battaramulla Line (IW1)
- Fort – Union Place (along Beire Lake) (IW2)
- Mattakkuliya – Hanwella (along the Kelani River) (IW3)

It is proposed to be launched as a public-private partnership. A boat service between Battaramulla and Nawala began in December 2016.

=== Roads ===
The roads plan involves expanding and extending existing key roadways, improving existing urban roads and intersections, and building elevated roadways from the New Kelani Bridge to Colombo Fort area, Colombo Port, and Battaramulla. Flyovers are also being built as an interim solution for traffic congestion.

=== Air ===
==== International Airport ====
An expansion of the Colombo International Airport will see a new terminal built. Construction started in 2017.

== Energy ==
The plan proposes the expansion and modernization of the Sapugaskanda Refinery, new natural gas power plants, the conversion of existing petroleum based power plants to natural gas and overhead voltage lines to underground insulated cables, exploration of natural gas reserves in Mannar, and the development of clean energy such as solar power, wind power, and waste-to-energy power plants.

The first waste to energy plant under the Western Region Megapolis plan entered construction in 2017 as an investment by Aitken Spence Group's Western Power Company and was opened in 2021.

== Planning areas ==
The project is divided into 11 planning areas in terms of geography and economic potential. Each has its own zoning rules and regulations:

1. Aero City Zone: Katunayake

The Aero City in Katunayake will involve development of airport infrastructure, including upgrading the aerodrome of the Colombo International Airport, a new passenger terminal, the Aero-City Business Park, an airport hotel, an international convention center, a second runway, and the development of an Aero-City residential township in Minuwangoda.

2. Tourism and Environmental Corridor: Muthurajawela

The tourism and Environmental corridor will be in the Muthurajawela wetlands.

3. Industrial City: Mirigama

Situated in Mirigama, the industrial city aims to bolster industries such as pharmaceuticals, electronic products, manufactured edible products from cultivated agricultural products, ceramics, glassware from mineral products, cosmetic products, and providing locations for SMEs that will support such industries. The project aims to create a livable city for migrants from rural areas to settle in Mirigama without moving to Colombo, which will attract real estate developers to develop quality housing, schools, healthcare facilities, and other social infrastructure.

4. Industrial City: Horana

The Horana industrial city will occupy approximately 85 km^{2} of existing towns and scattered villages. It is planned to attract large scale industries in tires and tubes, electronic products, pharmaceuticals, and food. The area was selected due to land availability and connectivity via the north–south highway. New residential townships will be created to provide affordable housing for workers attracting real estate development.

5. Logistics City

The Logistics City is strategically located in close proximity to the Colombo Port and the airport and is expected to span across a region of 306 km^{2}.It will be linked to other areas of the project through multimodal connectivity, such as dedicated roads, expressways, and railway links for freight handling and transportation. Industrial clusters are proposed for facilities such as transshipment, dry port, warehousing, cold storage, vehicle repair, and cargo distribution. The first phase of the Logistics city was launched in January 2017 by Prime Minister Ranil Wickremesinghe and Minister Champika Ranawaka. The first investment is a joint venture between GAC Group and Hemas Logistics to build a modern integrated logistics facility with a state-of-the-art distribution center, container yard and a warehouse facility.

6. Colombo Core Area

The core area is divided into two main segments: the Central Business District (CBD) and the Core Area, which overlaps with the boundaries of the Colombo and Gampaha Districts. The CBD project aims to develop the area for "work, life and play." A unique shopping district along Beira lake is proposed alongside an entertainment district on the other side of the Beira Lake and the Fort and Pettah areas will be developed into a pedestrian friendly area.

7. The Outer Core Area

The Outer Core area has been identified just outside the core area. They serve the suburbs that are expected to have higher population and purchasing power in the long term and is expected to be a medium density residential and mixed commercial development area.

8. Plantation City: Avissawella

The Plantation City consists of 330 km^{2} of plantation areas around Avissawella alongside pockets of residential development. The region's economy will be largely based on plantations and hopes to attract population from rural areas and to offer a different environment to live compared to densely populated Colombo and the surrounding areas.

9. Forest City

Occupying an area of approximately 1050 km^{2} in the southernmost part of the Western Region Megapolis, the Forest city contains a small population mostly engaged in agriculture and forest related activities. The area will be built upon farms, forests and heritage to improve quality of life while protecting the environment. The economy will be largely based on tourism, including eco-and agritourism.

10. Coastal and Marine Zone

11. Science and Technology City

Also known as the "Techno City," the Ministry of Megapolis and Western Development envisions to build a Science and Technology City dedicated to knowledge services and research based education and training. It is planned to be located mainly around the town centers from Homagama to Kaduwela via Malabe. With a mission to utilize science and technology to increase the wealth of the community by promoting the culture of innovation and the competitiveness of associated businesses, industries and knowledge-based institutions, the project plans to contain high-tech research and development centers, incubation centers, and high-tech industries with all the requisite support services and facilities and a dedicated technological university.

The Science and Technology City is planned to primarily focus on nanotechnology, civil nuclear technology, space technology, information and communication technologies, electronic manufacturing and semiconductor technologies, robotics and automation, biotechnology, and gene technology. This project is expected to attract business park developers, software houses, big players in advanced technology, bio-medical industries, and real estate developers.

The city will also contain shopping complexes, cinemas, schools, recreational areas, parking blocks, and a National Space Technology Hub, including Ground Station infrastructure for receiving and distribution of Earth Observation Satellite Data. The first phase of the project started in September 2016 with initial investments close to 20 billion Rupees by universities and the Arthur C. Clark Institution for Modern Technologies.
