= Colombo Monorail =

Proposed monorail system in Sri Lanka

The Colombo Monorail was a proposed monorail system to be built in Colombo, Sri Lanka. The project was estimated to cost US$ 1.3 billion. However a Japanese JICA transportation master plan for Colombo did not recommend a Monorail as a priority and recommended a Bus Rapid Transit (BRT), Railway electrification and an overhead light rail system instead. A separate study by the Ministry of Megapolis and Western Development also concluded that a light rail system to be much more feasible than a monorail, and recommended light rail, an electrified railway system and an inland water transport (a brand new boat/ferry service that utilises Colombo’s historic canal network) under the Western Region Megapolis project.

== Lines ==
The monorail was to consist of two lines, one from Malabe into the city through Thalahena, Robert Gunawardena Mawatha, Rajagiriya and Horton Place, and another from Moratuwa passing Dehiwala and Wellawatte and passing along the Galle Road. Both lines were to converge at a multi-modal hub in Colombo Fort.

LN1: Malabe to Colombo Fort

LN2: Colombo Fort to Moratuwa

== Management & Rolling stock ==
Rolling stock for the monorail was to be procured from either Hitachi Monorails limited or China based CSR ZELC.

== Substitute initiative ==
In April 2015, the Government of Sri Lanka issued a Gazette bill to construct an electric train system to connect Colombo with Sri Lanka's capital city Sri Jayawardenapura in Kotte.

This was chosen to replace the monorail due to the lesser cost of implementation and maintenance. The BRT system is in its feasibility test stage.

== Replacement by LRT ==
The Colombo Monorail was replaced by a Light Rail Transport (LRT) system for multiple reasons:

=== 1. Technology Prevalence ===
Light rail systems are in widespread use across the globe and is a much more accepted technology, while Monorail is a relatively new technology and are primarily used for internal circulation such as theme parks, between airport terminal and shopping malls. This is evident with 30 of the total 54 of the current systems (56%) falling into this category. Termination of Monorail in Sydney, Jakarta shifting the Monorail project to a LRT project in the middle of construction and the Malacca Monorail been on idle due to technical problems were cited as reasons questioning the suitability of the system. The LRT clearly stands out as an evolved technology and enough research to support the technology.

=== 2. System Cost ===
The system cost of both LRT and monorail composed of vehicles, guideway, stations and control systems. Most of the literature states that the cost component of both LRT and monorail remains the same when considering an alignment on elevated section with 50 million USD/km. However, with LRT being able to operate on ground the cost can be considerably reduced to around 30 million USD/km. The RTS traces for the Megapolis has major portion as elevated since it is proposed within the CBD and heavily urbanized areas. However, the portion that can go on ground accounts for 13 km out of proposed 75 km which is 17% of the total length. Due to the possible ground operations, the total system cost can be reduced significantly.Mainly due to the instalment of Depots/Yards and some stations on ground. An elevated depot have a huge costs associated which needs elevated structures to park the vehicles. The monorail feasibility done by the JAICA for a 23.1 km of track length has proposed a 5.3 km of track within the depots showing the extra cost. The typical ground depot is 50% less than an elevated depot, while it is similar for stations as well.

Hitachi claims that costs for Monorail costs could be reduced by 30% due to a much sleeker elevated structure however the numbers were seen as misleading as the numbers could not be verified and the JAICA feasibility study only showed 8% cost reduction due to the sleeker structure. The cost advantage is also offset by other limitations such as monorail switches appear to entail more complicated machinery, and have a significantly higher cost about 15 times the cost of an ordinary railway switch.

=== 3. Switching ===
While LRT requires a simple rail road switch, monorail requires a complicated switching system. Vuchic (2007) finds the switching issue on monorail as one of the main limitations. Other than extremely higher costs ranging to 15 times of a regular switch, he suggest that large areas are required compared to a regular switch, which shows that the urban foot print advantage for monorails is not constant for all systems. He further reason out that the switching issues are the reasons monorails operate as single lines and that it is very complex to plan for network of monorails.further it creates an operational concern as it is essential a segments of concrete beams that are mechanically moved into place, which takes 15–25 seconds in contrasts to 0.6 second switch time for conventional rail which will escalate the cost of construction while such complex switching process is not needed in a LRT System. More the number of lines interconnecting more the switching will be complex and the associated cost where as in the proposed system in locations such as Fort, Maradana and Borella will have more than 3 lines interconnecting.

=== 4. Expansion as a Network ===
Monorail has not expanded as a network due to crossings. Monorail can’t have crossings unless grade separated while LRT can. One of the few which is rare to find is at NiuJiaoTuo Station in Chongqing Monorail in China the longest monorail at over 80 km. Even then it is a grade separated massive structure . In places like Borella as many lines are interconnecting, crossings are needed to ensure the interconnectivity and the continuity of the lines.

=== 5. Aesthetic/Other Aspect ===
Monorail being slimmer than LRT is considered aesthetically more pleasing than LRT, day light penetration is obstructed by the deck of a LRT structure while monorail structure allows penetration. Monorail promoters habitually tend to portray monorail systems as light, airy, slender, unobtrusive structures sailing gracefully over fields and streets typically only photos of renditions of single beam guideways are presented. But the practically the slender beam structure has result in various operational issues such as evacuation of passengers during breakdown since there is no platform for the passengers to get off in case of evacuation. Instances where the passengers been stranded for hours such as in Mumbai where the passengers had to be rescued with the help of fire brigade has been cited. To mitigate the practical issue, walkways between the monorail beams have been erected so that people can walk out in such solution which results in them losing the only advantage of day light penetration which is considerably blocked. The Las Vegas project demonstrates, a bona fide, heavy-duty, real world monorail consists of a lot more heavy, physical, elevated infrastructure than just a slender beamway. Similar to monorails not requiring overhead power lines LRT can use third rail system instead of the overhead catenary system.

Patrick M (2014) notes that apart from switching issues monorail processes, considerable maintenance and energy issues.While monorail along with LRT has a life span of around 30 years, monorail which has tires that run on the beam only last 160,000 km requiring periodic replacement and additional operational and maintenance costs. It is also suggested that energy consumption of monorail is 25-30% greater than LRT technologies due to the rubber wheel system’s greater rolling resistance.

== See also ==
- List of monorail systems
- Colombo Light Rail
