= Western Region Megapolis Light Rail Transit =

Western Region Megapolis Light Rail Transit කොළඹ සැහැල්ලු දුම්රිය සංක්‍රමණ පද්ධතිය கொழும்பு இலகு ரக இருப்புப்பாதை

Overview
- Area served: Western Region Megapolis
- Locale: Colombo District/Western Region Megapolis
- Transit type: Light rail/Light metro/Light rapid transit
- Number of lines: 4 (proposed)

Technical
- System length: 98.3 km (61.1 mi)

The Western Region Megapolis Light Rail Transit System (Sinhala: කොළඹ සැහැල්ලු දුම්රිය සංක්‍රමණ පද්ධතිය. Tamil: கொழும்பு இலகு ரக இருப்புப்பாதை கட்டமைப்பு) (previously referred to as the Colombo Light Rail) is a proposed metropolitan light rail system which will serve the designated Western Region Megapolis area within the Colombo District, Sri Lanka. The system is planned to be operated as a public-private partnership between the Government of Sri Lanka and selected private entities.

The project estimated to be worth US$1.5 billion was commenced during the presidency of Maithripala Sirisena in 2017 and was regarded as the largest single foreign-funded infrastructure project in Sri Lanka. The funding came from the Japan International Cooperation Agency which provided an extremely low-interest loan with an interest rate of only 0.1% which is repayable over 40 years with a 12-year grace period. In September 2020 president Gotabaya Rajapaksa unilaterally cancelled the project resulting in the government incurring billions of rupees in losses and compensation for consultants . The cancellation also severely impacted relations with Japan which had been a major source of financial and technological assistance to Sri Lanka making Japan unwilling to provide further aid to the Rajapaksa administration.

In December 2022 newly appointed president Ranil Wikremesighe announced the government is attempting to revive the project after the ousting of the president Gotabaya Rajapaksa. However the Japanese government has stated that it has not decided on reviving the project and is monitoring if the Sri Lankan government can carry out reforms to regain the trust of Japan and the business community.

== History ==
The project commenced in 2017 but in September 2020 due to the change in administration in Sri Lanka, the newly elected president Gotabaya Rajapaksa ordered the cancellation of the project claiming that it was not a cost-effective solution. The government later claimed that the project was not cancelled and would continue with changes But in 2022 the Auditor Generals department confirmed that the project was scrapped unilaterally by Gotabaya and began an investigation into the cancellation. The audit found that due to Gotabhaya's unilateral actions the Sri Lankan government suffered a loss of almost Rs. 6 billion which had been spent so far on the project.

In June 2021, it was reported that a Japanese firm which was involved with the project claimed damages and compensation amounting to Rs. 5.8 billion as a result of scrapping the project. In December 2022, the government announced the project was being revived again.

== Infrastructure ==
| Map colour | Status | Length | Terminal | | Funding |
|---|---|---|---|---|---|
| Green | Feasibility study completed | 28.6 kilometres (17.8 mi) | Kelaniya | Moratuwa | PPP |
| Red | Feasibility study completed | 32.4 kilometres (20.1 mi) | Ragama | Kirulapana | PPP |
| Purple | Feasibility study completed | 15.8 kilometres (9.8 mi) | Malabe | Petta | JAICA |
| Blue | Feasibility study completed | 21.5 kilometres (13.4 mi) | Hunupitiya | Kottawa | PPP |

== See also ==
- Sri Lanka Railways
- Transport in Sri Lanka
- Ministry of Megapolis and Western Development
- Colombo Monorail, another possible transport solution, but the light rail system was selected instead
