= Millennium City =

Millennium City may refer to:

- Millennium City, Hong Kong, a group of buildings in Hong Kong
- Millennium City, a shopping and residential complex focused on the Millennium Tower in Austria
- The nickname of Gurugram, a city in Haryana, India
  - Millennium City Centre Gurugram metro station
- The nickname of Cuttack, a city in Odisha, India
- The nickname of DeCordova, Texas, a city in Hood County, Texas
- Three cities awarded City status in the United Kingdom in the year 2000:
  - Brighton and Hove
  - Wolverhampton
  - Inverness
- A setting in the role playing games Champions and Champions Online
- Millennium City incident, a scandal that occurred in Sri Lanka in 2002
