= Jathika Hela Urumaya =

National Heritage Party ජාතික හෙළ උරුමය ஜாதிக்க ஹெல உறுமய
- Leader: Ven. Omalpe Sobhitha Thera
- Chairperson: Ven. Hadigalle Wimalasara Thera
- Secretary: Bandula Harishchandra
- Founded: February 2004 (22 years ago)
- Preceded by: Sinhala Heritage
- Headquarters: 047/3A Denzil Kobbekaduwa Mawatha, Pannipitiya Road, Battaramulla
- Ideology: Sinhalese Buddhist nationalism; Anti-federalism
- Political position: Right-wing to far-right
- Religion: Theravada Buddhism
- National affiliation: Samagi Jana Balawegaya
- Colors: Orange
- Parliament of Sri Lanka: 0 / 225

Election symbol
- Conch

Website
- www.jhu.lk

The Jathika Hela Urumaya (abbrv. JHU; Sinhala: ජාතික හෙළ උරුමය; Tamil: ஜாதிக்க ஹெல உறுமய), less commonly known by its English name the National Heritage Party, is a Sinhala Buddhist nationalist political party in Sri Lanka. The JHU was launched in February 2004 by the lay-based, Sinhalese nationalist political party Sihala Urumaya.

Founding members include Kolonnawe Sumangala Thera, Uduwe Dhammaloka Thera, Ellawala Medhananda Thera, Omalpe Sobhitha Thera, Athuraliye Rathana Thera and Thilak Karunaratne. Initially, all candidates fielded by the party were Buddhist clergy. Some Sri Lankan Buddhists, including the All Island Clergy Organisation, denounced the monks' entrance into politics. Regardless, the party mainly drew support from middle-class conservatives and Buddhist youth.

== History ==
The Jathika Hela Urumaya contested its first parliamentary election in 2004. All of its candidates were Buddhist monks. At the election, the party won 5.97% of the popular vote (a total of 552,724 votes) and 9 out of 225 seats, making it the fourth largest party in parliament.

Following the election, the party would get involved in a number of controversies. One action was introducing a bill to prohibit unethical religious conversions. This was viewed as a reaction against proselytism systematically carried out by Christian fundamentalist groups with many guises, some of whom happened to be foreigners affiliated with non-governmental organisations. There had been some dramatic infighting within the JHU parliamentary group early on in its parliamentary profile. This was partly because the group had been cobbled together just before the polls, and lacked unity on several grounds including the issue of how to relate to government formation.

Two of its founding members, Theras Kolonnawe Sumangala and Uduwe Dhammaloka left the party due to conflicts within the party between the monastic and lay members. The lay leader of the Sihala Urumaya also defected to the United National Party after seizing the party headquarters. After months of trouble, the party made a strong comeback, with the young monk Athuraliye Rathana Thera and Champika Ranawaka leading the comeback. Ellawela Medhananda and Omalpe Sobhitha Theras remained in the party leadership. Other influential members included Dr. Neville Karunatilake and Nishantha Sri Warnasinghe. The JHU was also affiliated with the National Movement Against Terrorism (NMAT), SPUR, North-East Sinhala Organisation (NESO) and other local and international Sinhala nationalist groups.

In mid-2005, the JHU successfully appealed the supreme court not to extend president Chandrika Kumaratunga's term by an extra year. In October 2005, former JHU member Uduwe Dhammaloka indicated that there was a growing sentiment amongst the monks of the JHU that directly entering the political realm was a mistake. Dhammaloka indicated that he personally believed that monks could have a more positive impact on Sri Lankan society by focusing on religious work, and that the current crop of monk-parliamentarians intended to "ensure that monks will not enter politics again" ("Monks"). It was, however, unclear if Uduwe Dhammaloka and other ordained members of parliament would resign their positions, or if legislation would be introduced to restrict monks from standing for public office (as is currently the case in Thailand).

The JHU endorsed prime minister Mahinda Rajapaksa in the 2005 presidential election. In 2007, the JHU officially became part of the Rajapaksa government, after the resignation of Buddhist monk MP Omalpe Thera, Champika Ranawaka was made an MP and then appointed Cabinet Minister of Environment and Natural Resources.

In 2014, the JHU withdrew its support of president Rajapaksa and supported opposition candidate Maithripala Sirisena, who was backed by the United National Party in the 2015 presidential elections. In the 2015 general elections, the party contested under the elephant symbol of the UNP and won 3 seats. Champika Ranawaka was appointed as Minister of Megalopolis and Western Development on 4 September 2015, and is to date the only individual to have led the ministry.

=== Charges against the United States ===
The JHU launched a campaign to collect one million signatures to petition United Nations Secretary-General Ban Ki-moon to establish a commission to inquire into human rights violations committed by the United States.

== Ideology ==
During the Sri Lankan civil war, the JHU advocated for wiping out the Liberation Tigers of Tamil Eelam by military force, and the party played a major role in making that dream a reality. The party is strongly anti-federalist and wishes to maintain Sri Lanka's unitary constitution.

The JHU is actively against deforestation and promotes organic farming. The JHU has also been instrumental in implementing several policy programmes, including a ban on smoking in public places and limitations on alcohol, banning of harmful pesticides, mandatory closings of liquor stores and bans on selling meat on Poya and other notable Buddhist festivals.

== Electoral history ==
Sri Lanka Parliamentary Elections
Election year	Votes	Vote %	Seats won	+/–	Government
2000	127,863	1.48%	1 / 225	▲1	Opposition
2001	50,665	0.57%	0 / 225	▼1	Extra-parliamentary
2004	552,724	5.97%	9 / 225	▲9	Opposition
2010	Was part of United People's Freedom Alliance		3 / 225	▼6	Government
2015	Was part of United National Front for Good Governance		2 / 225	▼1	Government
2020	Was part of Samagi Jana Balawegaya		1 / 225	▼1	Opposition

== See also ==
- Buddhism in Sri Lanka
- Theravada Buddhism
