= Oruwala =

Oruwala Oruwela
- Suburb
- Location in Sri Lanka Oruwala (Sri Lanka)
- Coordinates: 6°53′25.08″N 79°59′46.68″E
- Country: Sri Lanka
- Province: Western Province
- District: Colombo District
- Elevation: 26 m (85 ft)

Population (2012)
  - Total: 4,501
- Time zone: UTC+5:30 (Sri Lanka Time)
- Postcode: 10150

Oruwala, also spelled Oruwela, was a village but is now a suburb of Colombo in the Colombo District, Western Province, Sri Lanka.

It is located at the junction of B174 (Kaduwela - Athurugiriya Road) and M. D. H. Jayawardana Road, approximately 20 km (12 mi) south-east of Colombo.

The Millennium City housing estate, the Ceylon Steel Corporation industrial estate and the Oruwala Public Cemetery are all located in Oruwala.

== Ceylon Steel Corporation ==
In 1960 the government purchased 123 ha (300 acres) of land at Oruwala for the purpose of establishing a domestic steel industry. The site was cleared and levelled by the Ceylon Army Engineers and the civil construction was undertaken by the State Engineering Corporation.

On 20 March 1967 the Ceylon Steel Corporation officially opened its steel rolling mill in the village, although steel production at the plant commenced in late 1966. The plant was built with financial aid from the Soviet Union and had an annual capacity of 60,000 tons. In 1968 renowned architect, Geoffrey Bawa, was commissioned to design the corporation's offices at Oruwela. The three-storey building, which projects over the adjoining reservoir, is constructed from framed reinforced concrete, with an external breathing wall formed from pre-cast rectangular concrete grills, which diminish in scale from floor to floor. The design was for open-plan offices in order to maximise natural light and ventilation. The building has been described as “Seen from the reservoir bund the building looks like an elegant Mississippi River boat moored to the shore.” Bawa was also responsible for the design of a guest house and factory worker's housing, which consists of back-to-back courtyard houses built along the contours of the adjoining rubber plantation.

In 2011, Ceylon Steel Corporation completed a three-year expansion project at Oruwela, increasing the iron mill’s annual production capacity from 100,000 tons to 250,000 tons.
