= Nagahamulla =

- Suburb
- Location within Sri Lanka
- Coordinates: 6.884781°N 79.932253°E
- Country: Sri Lanka
- Province: Western Province
- District: Colombo District
- Time zone: UTC+5:30 (Sri Lanka Standard Time Zone)
- Postal code: 10120

Nagahamulla is a suburb of Battaramulla, in the Colombo District, Sri Lanka. It is administered by the Kaduwela Municipal Council.

It is located 8.4 km (5.2 mi) from Colombo Fort, near the Sri Lankan parliament building.

== Features ==
- Thalangama Wetland, one of four recognised urban wetlands, which make up Colombo's flood retention belt.
- New water reserve tank is also currently under construction.
