= Victory Day =

Public holiday to commemorate a nation's victory

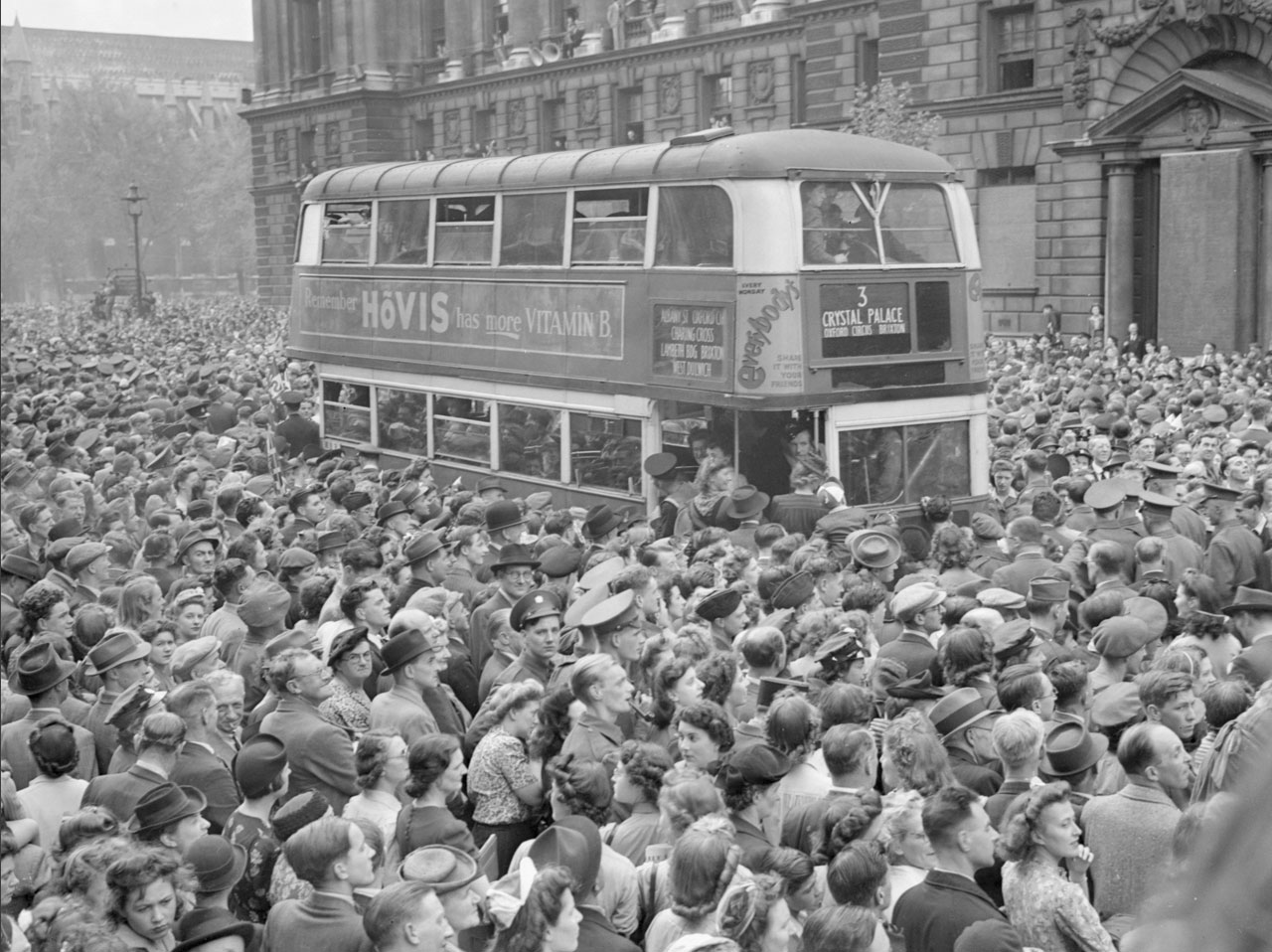
People gathered in Whitehall to hear Winston Churchill's victory speech and celebrate Victory in Europe, 8 May 1945

Victory Day is a commonly used name for public holidays in various countries, where it commemorates a nation's triumph over a hostile force in a war or the liberation of a country from hostile occupation. In many cases, multiple countries may observe the same holiday, with the most prominent united celebrations occurring in states that comprised the Allies of World War II, celebrating the defeat of Nazi Germany.

== List ==
State	Holiday	Date	Observed	Relationship	Ref.
Afghanistan	Mujahideen Victory Day	28 April	1992–present	Soviet–Afghan War	
Afghanistan	Taliban Victory Day	15 August	2022–present	War in Afghanistan	
Algeria	Victory Day	19 March	1962–present	Algerian War	
Armenia	Victory Day (Note: Countries celebrating the same Victory Day of the Soviet Union)	9 May	1995–present	World War II	
Azerbaijan	Victory Day	8 November	2020–present	2020 Nagorno-Karabakh War	
Bangladesh	Victory Day (Note: Countries celebrating the same Victory Day over Pakistan)	16 December	1971–present	Bangladesh Liberation War	
Belarus	Victory Day	9 May	1945–present	World War II	
Bosnia–Herzegovina	Victory Day	9 May		World War II	
China	Victory over Japan Day	3 September	1946–present	World War II	
Croatia	Victory and Homeland Thanksgiving Day	5 August	2003–present	Croatian War of Independence	
Croatia	Victory Day	9 May	2019–present	World War II	
Czech Republic	Victory in Europe Day (Note: Countries celebrating the same Victory in Europe Day of the Allies of World War II)	8 May	1993-present	World War II	
France	Victory in Europe Day	8 May	1945–present	World War II	
Estonia	Võidupüha	23 June	1934–1939; 1992–present	Estonian War of Independence	
Georgia	Victory Day	9 May	1945–present	World War II	
India	Vijay Diwas	16 December	1972–present	Indo-Pakistani War of 1971	
India	Kargil Vijay Diwas	26 July	2000–present	Indo-Pakistani War of 1999	
Israel	Victory in Europe Day (Israeli)	9 May	2018–present	World War II	
Iraq	Victory Day	10 December	2017–present	Victory over Daesh ISIS	
Kazakhstan	Victory Day	9 May	1945–present	World War II	
Kyrgyzstan	Victory Day	9 May	1945–present	World War II	
Maldives	Victory Day	3 November	1989-Present	1988 Maldives coup attempt	
Malta	Victory Day	8 September		Great Siege of Malta, French blockade, World War II	
Moldova	Victory Day	9 May	1945–present	World War II	
Mozambique	Lusaka Accord Day	7 September	1975–present	Mozambican War of Independence	
Netherlands	Liberation Day	5 May	1990–present	World War II	
North Korea	Day of Victory in the Great Fatherland Liberation War	27 July	1973–present	Korean War	
Poland	Victory Day	9 May	1945–2014	World War II	
Poland	Victory in Europe Day	8 May	2015–present	World War II	
Russia	Victory Day	9 May	1995–present	World War II	
Serbia	Victory Day	9 May	1995–present	World War II	
Sri Lanka	Victory Day	18 May	2010–2014	Sri Lankan Civil War	
Sri Lanka	Remembrance Day	18 May	2015–present	Sri Lankan Civil War	
Turkey	Victory Day	30 August	1926–present	Turkish War of Independence	
Ukraine	Victory Day	9 May	1991–2015	World War II	
Ukraine	Victory Day over Nazism in World War II	9 May	2016–2023	World War II	
Ukraine	Day of Remembrance and Victory over Nazism in World War II 1939 – 1945	8 May	2023–present	World War II	
United Kingdom	Victory in Europe Day	8 May	1945–present	World War II	
United States (Rhode Island)	Victory Day	Second Monday in August	1945–present	World War II	
Vietnam	Reunification Day	30 April	1976–present	Vietnam War	

== See also ==
- 11 November: Remembrance Day, Veterans Day, Armistice Day
- Liberation Day: List of dates on which countries were liberated from occupiers
- National Day: A day marking the founding of a nation which can be related to a key victory
