= Dhammaloka =

Dhammaloka may refer to:

- Uduwe Dhammaloka, a popular Buddhist monk in Sri Lanka
- U Dhammaloka (1856? – 1914?), an early western Buddhist monk in Burma and Singapore
- Dhammalok Mahasthavir (1890–1966), one of early Nepalese Buddhist monks
