= Suriyapperuma =

Suriyapperuma is a surname, commonly used in Sri Lanka. Notable people with the surname include:

- Harshana Suriyapperuma, Sri Lankan politician
- J. R. P. Suriyapperuma (1928–2025), Sri Lankan politician
