= Amaradeva Asapuwa =

Music ashram in Battaramulla, Sri Lanka

Amaradeva Asapuwa (අමරදේව අසපුව/அமரதேவ மடாலயம்) is a music ashram, which is being built in Battaramulla, Sri Lanka in memory of one of the country's leading musicians, W. D. Amaradeva. Construction began on 28 August 2017, with the President of Sri Lanka Maithripala Sirisena laying the foundation stone. The building will be fully funded by the government of Sri Lanka on a site area of 490 ha (1,200 acres). The building will host awards and memories of Amaradeva and will include a library and a museum in addition to facilitation for musical experiments for local and overseas musicians It is estimated the building will cost Rs. 250 million.
