= Remembrance Day (Sri Lanka) =

Holiday commemorating the end of the Sri Lankan Civil War

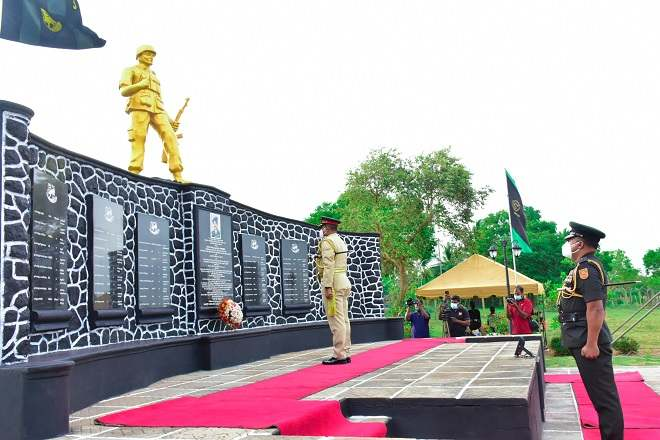
- Kilinochchi Headquarters War Heroes Monument
- Official name: ජාතික රණවිරු සැමරුම් උළෙල; National War heroes Commemoration Day
- Also called: Victory Day (2010–2014)
- Observed by: Sri Lankans
- Type: National
- Significance: End of the Sri Lankan Civil War and to commemorate the war dead
- Observances: Parades, silences, cultural show
- Date: 19 May
- Next time: 19 May 2027
- Frequency: Annual
- First time: 18 June 2010; 16 years ago

Remembrance Day (Sinhala: ජාතික රණවිරු සැමරුම් උළෙල Jāthika Raṇaviru Sæmarum Uḷela), also known as National War Heroes Commemoration Day, is a memorial day observed in Sri Lanka since the end of the Sri Lankan Civil War, which is observed to commemorate the war heroes which fought in the war and the civilians who were killed in the war from both sides. Remembrance Day is observed on 19 May, which marks the decisive victory of the Sri Lankan Army against the rebel Liberation Tigers of Tamil Eelam and the end of the Sri Lankan Civil War, on 18 May 2009.

Celebrations are marked by speeches and a moment of silence. Initially, under President Mahinda Rajapaksa, the day was known as Victory Day and included a military parade, but in 2015 was renamed Remembrance Day by President Maithripala Sirisena.

== History ==
The Sri Lankan Separatists War was an armed conflict fought between the Liberation Tigers of Tamil Eelam, and the Government of Sri Lanka, after the prelude of the Sri Lankan civil war between the Tamil Eelam Liberation Organisation, Eelam People's Revolutionary Liberation Front, People's Liberation Organisation of Tamil Eelam and Government of Sri Lanka, as the conflict came to an end with the Indo-Lanka accord (1987), where the armed groups made peace and they stopped fighting with the government in the late 1980s to early 1990s by aligning with the state. However, the radical extremist organisation LTTE was formed in demanding a sperate state, which emerged as the dominant armed force among extremist Tamil militants and transformed the struggle into a more organised and intense civil war, pursuing an armed campaign for a separate state. The 26-year conflict came to an end on 18 May 2009, with the total military defeat of the LTTE, and thus the day was marked as a day of celebration across the island.

Celebrations of the first anniversary were presided over by President Mahinda Rajapaksa, whose government was in power when the war ended. The celebrations were commemorated as Victory Day, a celebration of the triumph of the Armed Forces against terrorism in the country, and continued under the same name until 2015. Rajapaksa's successor, President Maithripala Sirisena renamed the day to Remembrance Day and moved the date to 19 May to "mark the sacrifices made by all those, who irrespective of their ethnicity, safeguarded the unity and territorial integrity of the country". The day also recognises all civilians who died in the war. The day is a step towards reconciliation between all ethnic communities of the country.

Commemorations for the Liberation Tigers of Tamil Eelam are not permitted.

== Anniversaries ==
	Date held	Location	Presided by
1st	18 June 2010	Galle Face Green, Colombo	Mahinda Rajapaksa
2nd	27 May 2011	Galle Face Green, Colombo	Mahinda Rajapaksa
3rd	19 May 2012	Galle Face Green, Colombo	Mahinda Rajapaksa
4th	18 May 2013	Galle Face Green, Colombo	Mahinda Rajapaksa
5th	18 May 2014	Matara	Mahinda Rajapaksa
6th	19 May 2015	Matara	Maithripala Sirisena
7th	18 May 2016	National War Memorial Battaramulla, Colombo	Maithripala Sirisena
8th	19 May 2017	National War Memorial Battaramulla, Colombo	Maithripala Sirisena
9th	19 May 2018	National War Memorial Battaramulla, Colombo	Maithripala Sirisena
10th	19 May 2019	National War Memorial Battaramulla, Colombo	Maithripala Sirisena
11th	19 May 2020	National War Memorial Battaramulla, Colombo	Gotabaya Rajapaksa
12th	19 May 2021	National War Memorial Battaramulla, Colombo	Gotabaya Rajapaksa
13th	19 May 2022	National War Memorial Battaramulla, Colombo	Gotabaya Rajapaksa
14th	19 May 2023	National War Memorial Battaramulla, Colombo	Ranil Wickremesinghe
15th	19 May 2024	National War Memorial Battaramulla, Colombo	Ranil Wickremesinghe
16th	19 May 2025	National War Memorial Battaramulla, Colombo	Anura Kumara Dissanayake
17th	19 May 2026		Anura Kumara Dissanayake

== See also ==
- National War Memorial, Colombo
- Cenotaph War Memorial, Colombo
- Mullivaikkal Remembrance Day
