= Diyatha Uyana =

Park in Battaramulla, Sri Lanka

Diyatha Park
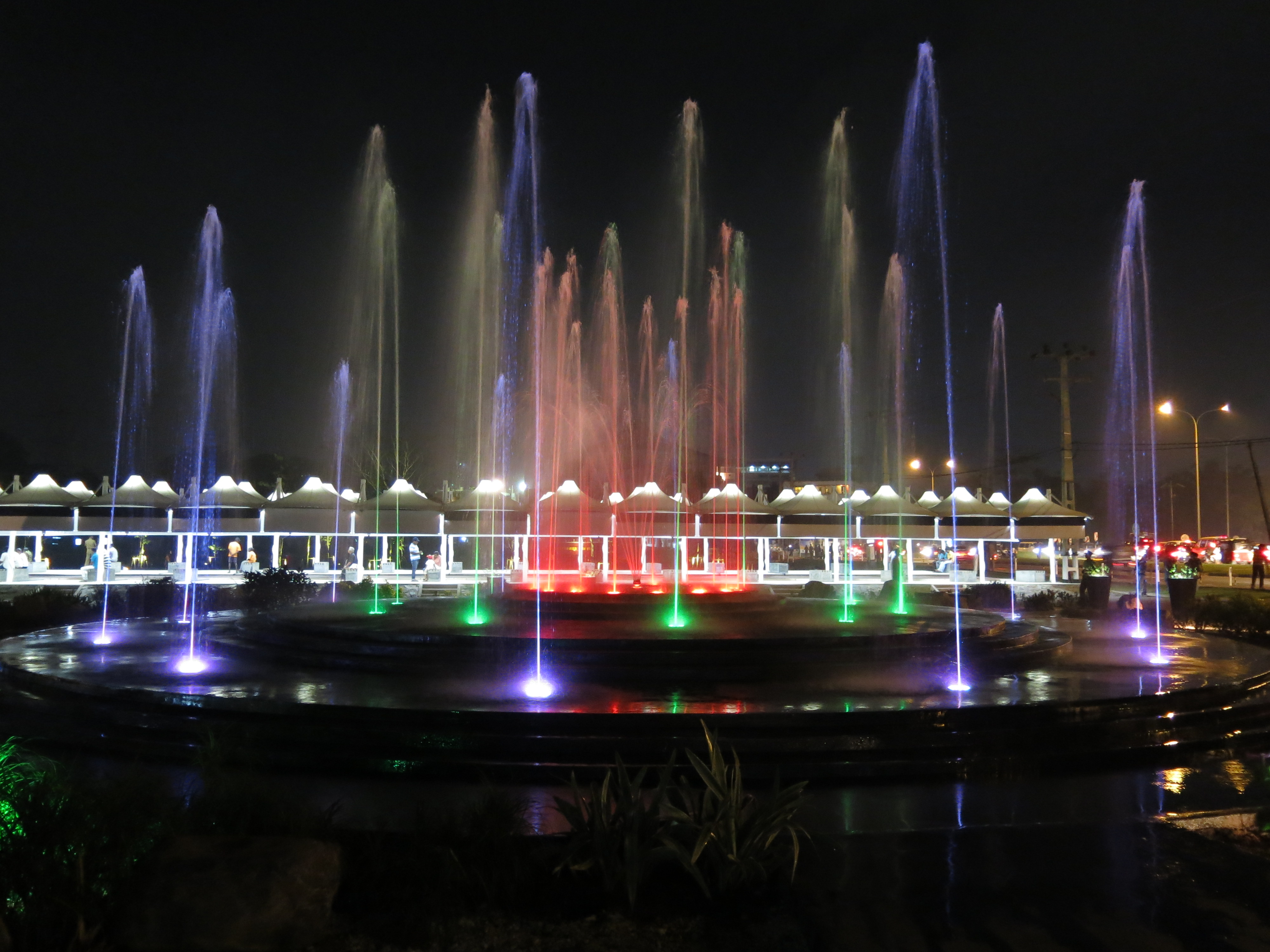

- Location within Sri Lanka
- Type: Public park
- Location: Battaramulla in Colombo, Sri Lanka
- Coordinates: 6°54′16″N 79°54′35″E
- Status: Open year round

Diyatha Uyana is located at Polduwa junction, Battaramulla near the Waters Edge Hotel. The park has been constructed on marshy land on the banks of the Diyawanna Oya. It sits between the Parliament Complex and the Diyawanna Oya at the Polduwa junction

== History ==
The Diyatha Uyana Park built along the banks of the Diyawanna Oya was opened on 15 September 2014. The opening ceremony of the "Diyatha Uyana" was attended by the Minister of Economic Development Basil Rajapaksa and Secretary Defence and Urban Development president, Gotabaya Rajapaksa. The project was carried out by the Sri Lanka Army, Sri Lanka Navy and Civil Security Department personnel under the close guidance and supervision of Secretary Defence and Urban Development Gotabaya Rajapaksa.

== Floating restaurant ==
The Water’s Edge floating restaurant was opened in December 2014. The construction of the floating restaurant was undertaken under the offshore patrol construction project of the Sri Lanka Navy to a local plan. Today this restaurant is managed by water sage hotel management. The restaurant can accommodate 36 to 55 people. It is 16 m (51 ft) in length and 9.4 m (31 ft) wide. A technical team of the Navy was appointed to handle all mechanical issues with the hotel crew for serving with a chef. Night rides are also available enabling tourists to view the city at dusk. The floating restaurant also accommodates individual functions.

== Gallery ==
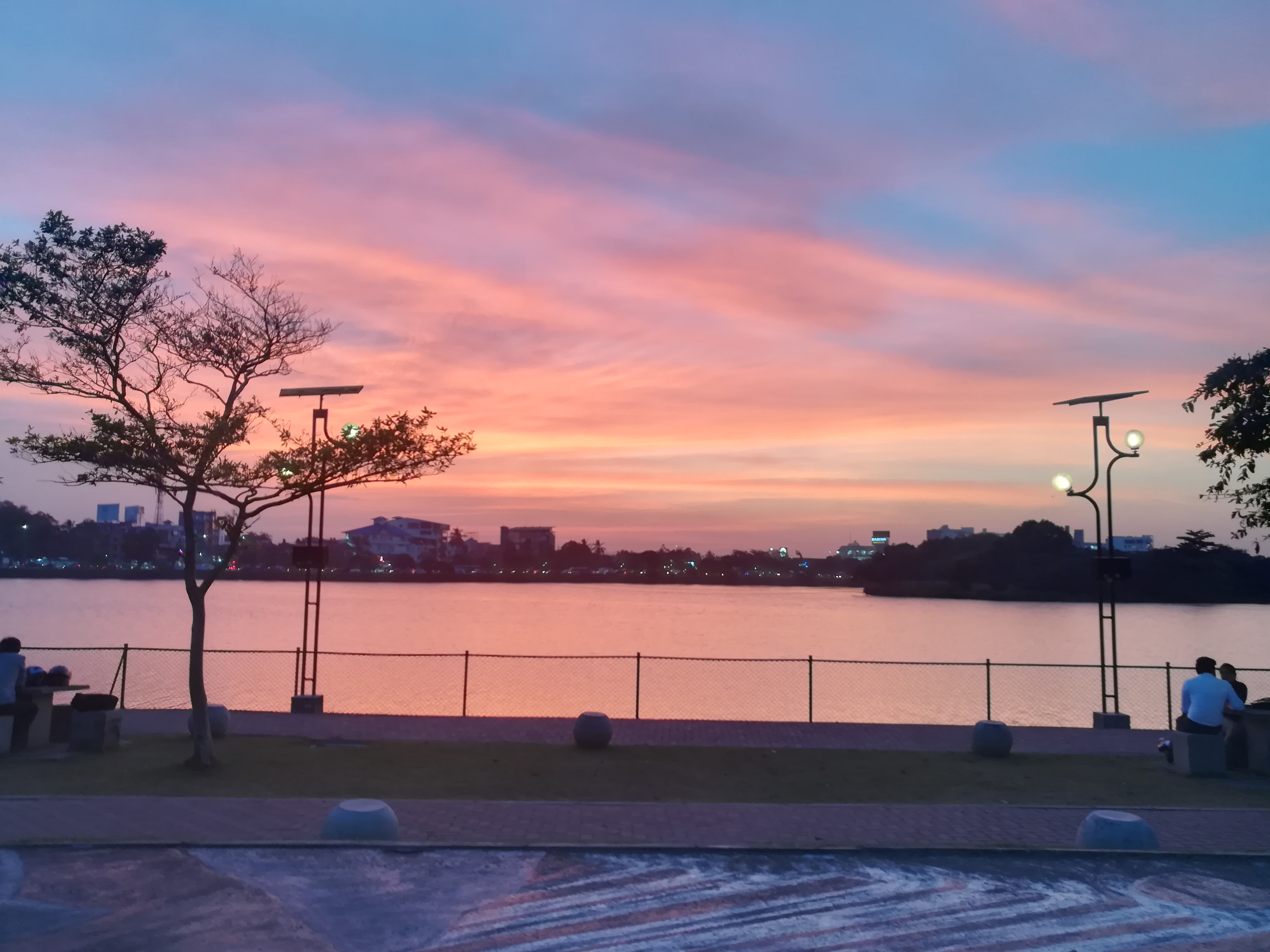
Beautiful Sunset

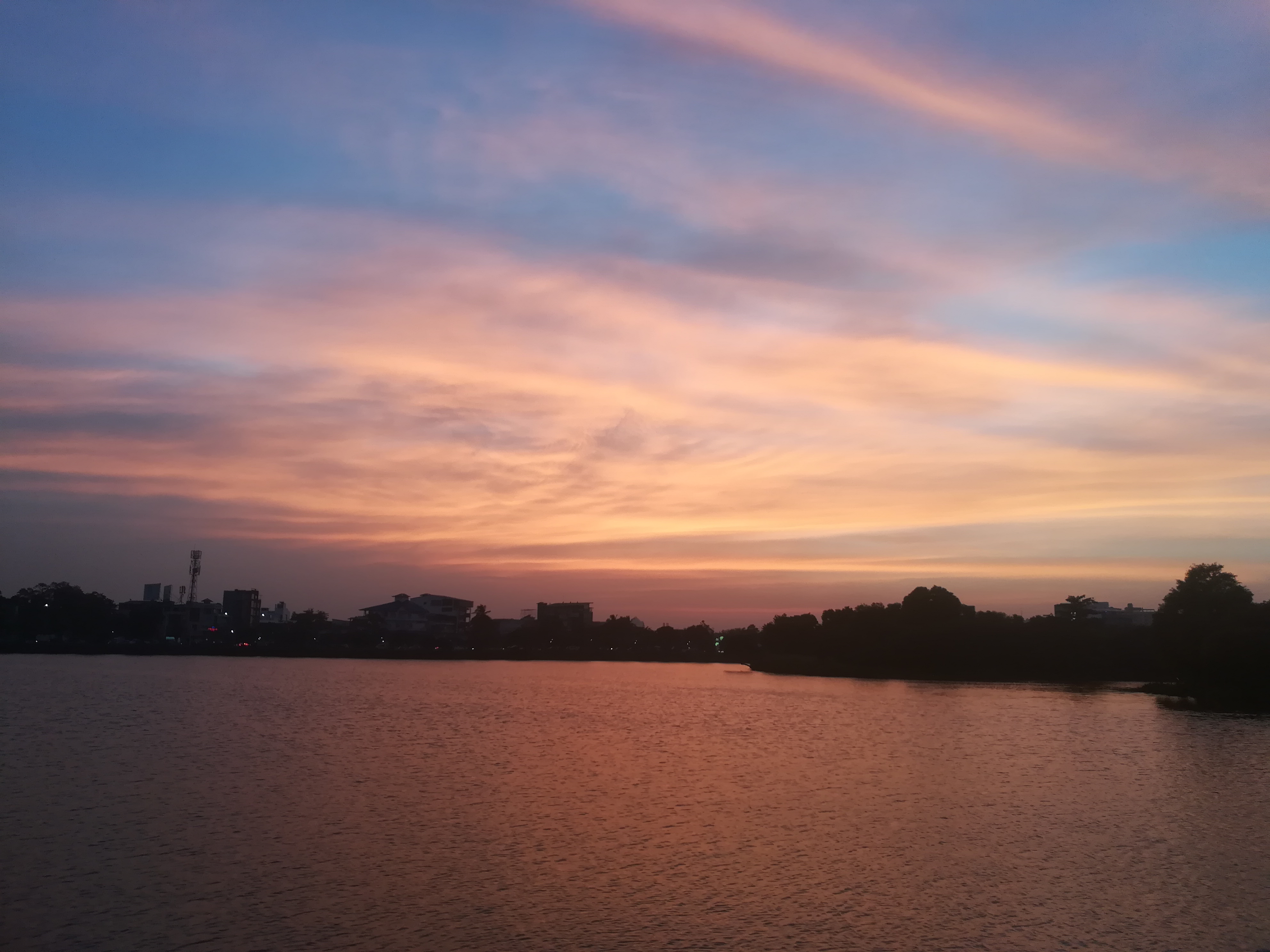
Sunset over the lake
