= National War Memorial, Colombo =

Memorial in Sri Lanka

National War Memorial
- Sri Lanka
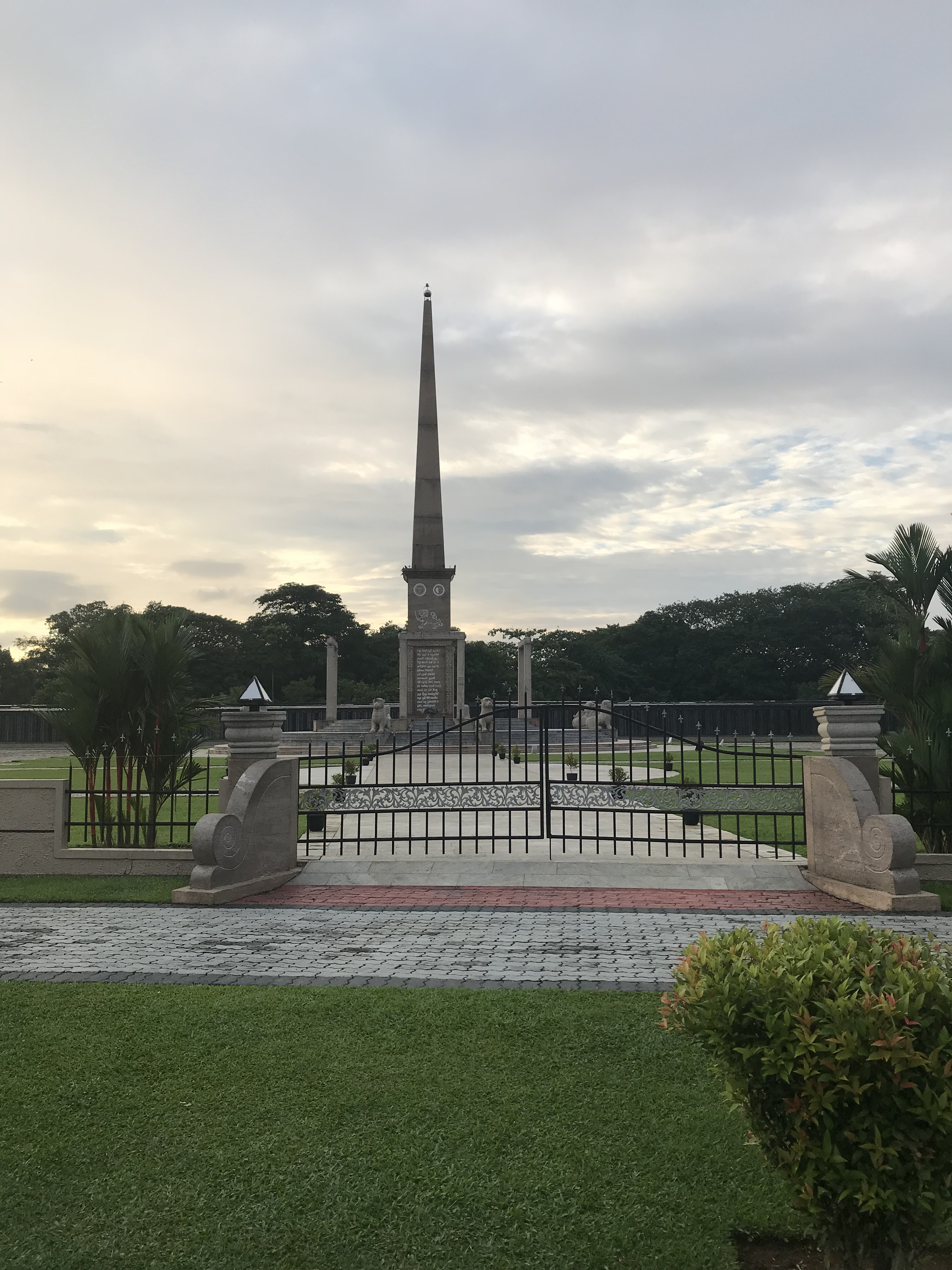
- National War Memorial
- For All Sri Lankan soldiers killed since World War I
- Unveiled: June 7, 2008
- Location: near Sri Jayawardenapura-Kotte, Battaramulla

The National War Memorial in front of the Parliament complex is dedicated to all military personnel killed since World War I as well as police personal killed due to militancy.

An annual ceremony to commemorate the velour and gallantry of War Heroes is held at the site on Remembrance Day of May.

The walls engraved with names of 28,619 war heroes of the Army (23,962), Navy (1160), Air Force (443), Police (2,598) & Civil Security department (456) who had sacrificed their lives in the fight against LTTE organization before May 2009.

== See also ==
- Remembrance Day (Sri Lanka)
- Cenotaph War Memorial, Colombo
