= Horizon Campus =

- Type: Private University
- Established: 2008; 18 years ago
- Chairman: Mr. Upul Daranagama
- Vice-Chancellor: Prof. S.J.B.A. Jayasekera
- Location: Horizon Campus, Knowledge City Malabe, KCM Drive, Off Millennium Road, Malabe, Sri Lanka; 6°55′34″N 79°57′39″E
- Campus: Main campus – Malabe Kandy Regional Center
- Website: www.horizoncampus.edu.lk

Horizon Campus is a leading private university in Sri Lanka

== Faculties ==
- Faculty of Education
- Faculty of Information Technology
- Faculty of Law
- Faculty of Management
- Faculty of Science
- Faculty of Nursing
- Faculty of Technology

== Memberships ==
Horizon Campus is a member of Association of Commonwealth Universities. It is also an institutional member of the Asia Pacific Quality Network It is a recognised teaching centre of the University of London.
