= Ellawala Medhananda Thera =

Sri Lankan politician

Hon. Ellawala Medhananda Thera එල්ලාවල මේධානන්ද MP

Member of Parliament for National List
- In office 2004–2015

Personal details
- Born: 28 January 1937 (age 89)
- Party: Jathika Hela Urumaya
- Other political affiliations: United People's Freedom Alliance
- Occupation: Buddhist monk

Ellawala Medhananda Thera (එල්ලාවල මේධානන්ද) is a Sri Lankan politician and a former member of the Parliament of Sri Lanka. He had also organised many charities and engaged himself in educational activities in under-privileged rural communities. As an academic scholar (see Pieris, op. cit.) he has published 40 books of academic and archaeological research of which the book on the "Sinhala-Buddhist Heritage in the Northern and Eastern Provinces" published in 2003 by Jayakody Publishers in Colombo is most well known. Medhananda was a Member of Parliament elected by the Jathika Hela Urumaya, a party which campaigned for the so-called rights of Buddhists. As a consequence, many Marxist as well as minority Tamil writers have criticised him for his alleged right-wing political leanings and pro-majoritarian sentiments. He presented himself for elections twice first in 2004 then in 2010. Since then he has devoted himself to charitable works, teaching and scholarly activities in rural regions of Sri Lanka
