= Uduwe Dhammaloka =

Sri Lankan politician

Hon. Uduwe Dhammaloka

Personal details
- Born: Sri Lanka

Ven. Uduwe Dhammaloka Thera, a popular Buddhist monk in Sri Lanka. He rose to fame from his weekly sermon programmes (bana) on TV. A critic of the government system in Sri Lanka he joined the Jathika Hela Urumaya (National Heritage Party) with a group of monks to contest the local elections in 2004 and was elected as a Member of Parliament.
