= Cenotaph War Memorial, Colombo =

War memorial in Sri Lanka

- Sri Lanka
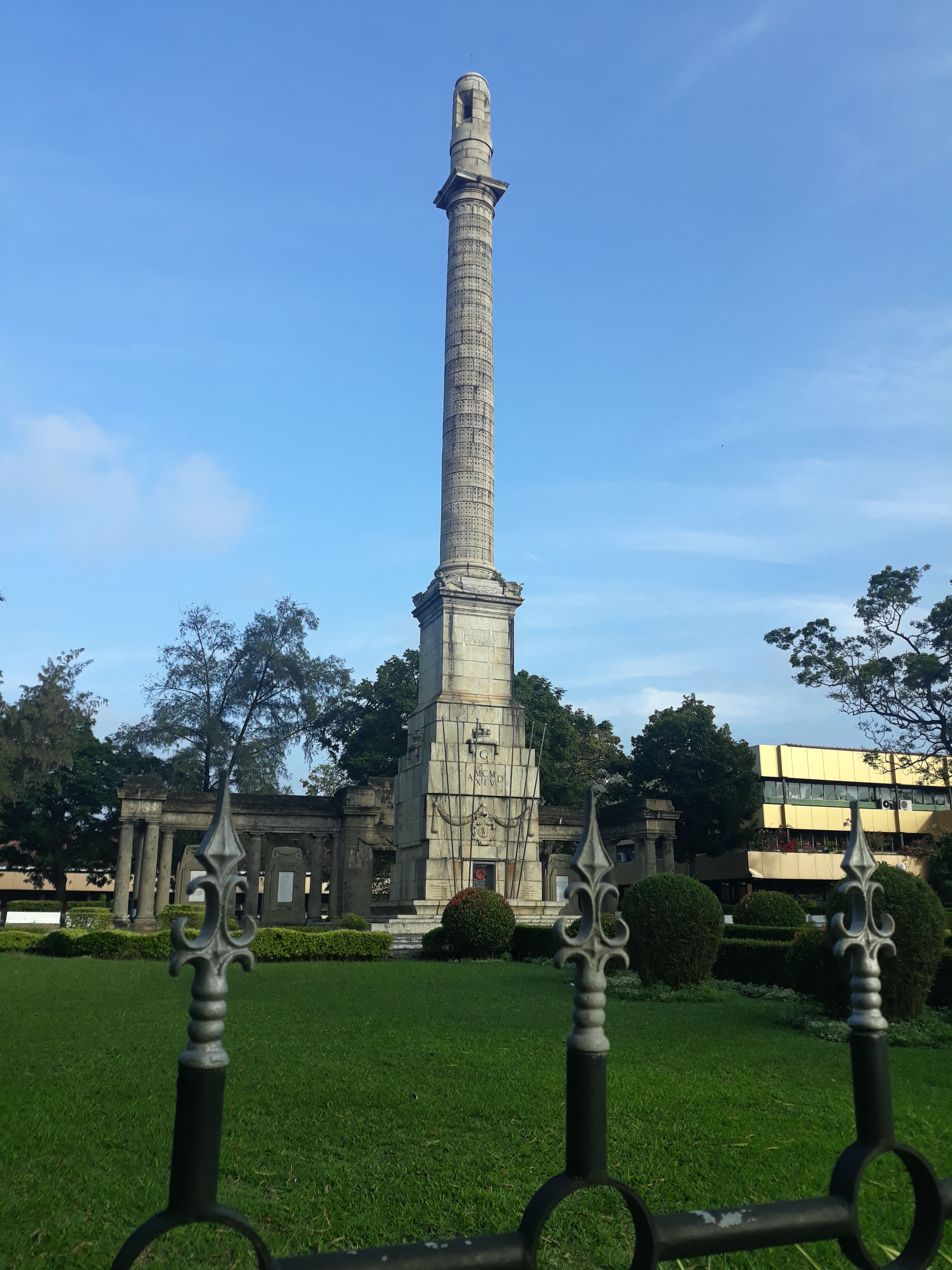
- Cenotaph War Memorial
- For Commonwealth soldiers killed in Great War and the Second World War
- Unveiled: 1923; 103 years ago
- Location: 6°54′47″N 79°51′30″E near Colombo

The Cenotaph War Memorial in Viharamahadevi Park, Colombo, Sri Lanka is a war memorial dedicated to the military personnel from Ceylon killed in action during the two world wars. It was designed by the architect Sir Edwin Landseer Lutyens. It comprises a towering Cenotaph and Memorial Walls. The foundation stone was laid by Brigadier General Sir William Henry Manning, Governor of Ceylon on December 7, 1921, and was unveiled by him October 27, 1923 at the Galle Face Green and was known as the Victory tower. It was dismantled and re-erected at Victoria Park, during World War II after fears that the Japanese might use it as a marker to direct their artillery. The Cenotaph contains the names of those killed in the Great War, while the Memorial Wall behind it maintains the names of those killed in the Second World War. A single woman, Miss L. Midwood is listed among the dead of the Great War.

An annual National Service of Remembrance is held at the site on Remembrance Sunday, the closest Sunday to 11 November (Armistice Day) each year.

== See also ==
- National War Memorial, Colombo
