= Champika Ranawaka =

Sri Lankan politician

Hon. Patali Champika Ranawaka
- පාඨලී චම්පික රණවක பாடலி சம்பிக்க ரணவக்க
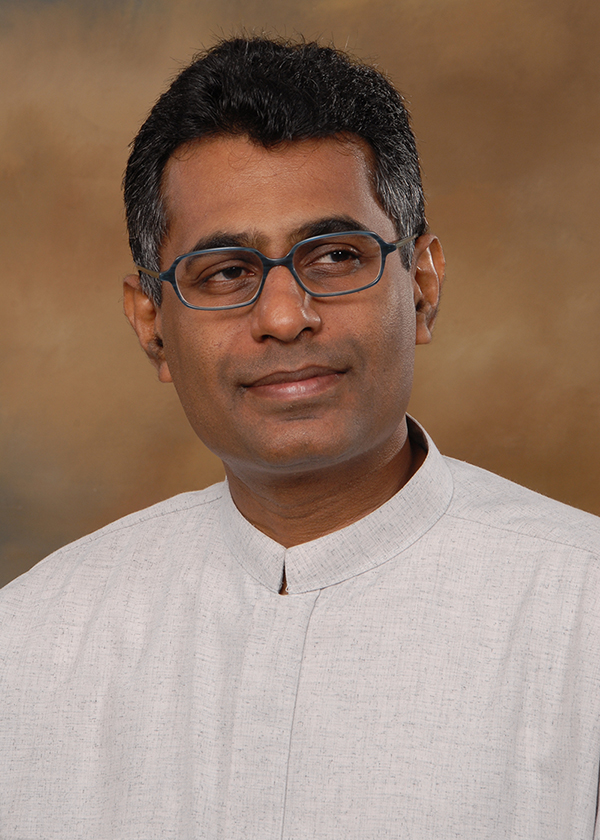

Minister of Megalopolis and Western Development
- In office 4 September 2015 – 17 November 2019
- President: Maithripala Sirisena
- Prime Minister: Ranil Wickremesinghe
- Preceded by: Ministry established

Minister of Power and Energy
- In office 12 January 2015 – 17 August 2015
- President: Maithripala Sirisena
- Prime Minister: Ranil Wickremesinghe
- Preceded by: Pavithra Devi Wanniarachchi
- Succeeded by: Ranjith Siyambalapitiya

Member of Parliament for Colombo District
- In office 22 April 2010 – 24 September 2024
- Majority: 65,574 Preferential Votes

Member of Parliament for National List
- In office 1 February 2007 – 9 February 2010
- Preceded by: Omalpe Sobhitha Thero

Personal details
- Born: 4 August 1965 (age 61) Kalutara, Sri Lanka
- Party: United Republican Front (since 2023)
- Other political affiliations: Jathika Hela Urumaya (until 2023); Samagi Jana Balawegaya (2020-2024)
- Education: University of Moratuwa; Taxila Central College, Horana
- Occupation: Politician
- Profession: Member of Parliament
- Website: Official website

Achchige Patali Champika Ranawaka (Sinhala: පාඨලී චම්පික රණවක; born 4 August 1965) is a Sri Lankan electrical engineer and a politician. He was a member of parliament from the Colombo District of the Samagi Jana Balawegaya. He is currently the leader of a civil society named "43rd Brigade", after declaring himself as an independent Member of Parliament on 8 June 2022. He was the Cabinet Minister of Megapolis and Western Development, as well as Minister of Environment and Natural Resources, Power and Energy and Technology, Research and Atomic Energy.

== Early life ==
Champika Ranawaka born in Bulathsinghala in the Kalutara district and entered Taxila Central College after being qualified from the Scholarship Examination. Been an all-rounder at different extra curricular activities, Ranawaka completed the GCE Advanced Level examination ranking first from the Kalutara District to the engineering faculty of the University of Moratuwa where he spent four years as an undergraduate. His family name Achchige is of Malayalam origin, achchi being the feminine form (mother) of the Malayalam word achchan meaning father, and is a name associated with the Kerala origin Kuruppu clan indicating matrilineal inheritance.

== Political career ==
Ranawaka was active in politics while in university in the late 1980s as a member of a pro-Janatha Vimukthi Peramuna student union, having spent over eight years as an undergraduate in the university engaged in politics. He was arrested as part of the crackdown student activists during the second JVP insurrection in 1988 and again in 1991.

He formed the non-political organization known as 'Janatha Mithuro' with some of his colleagues including Athuraliye Rathana Thero, Nishantha Warnasinghe and Malinda Seneviratne. Janatha Mithuro was criticized for its right-wing anti-Tamil ideology and actions. In the 1994 general and presidential elections the organization backed the People's Alliance led by Chandrika Kumaratunga.

Ranawaka later joined the Sihala Urumaya, a Sinhalese nationalist party. In 1998 he took part in forming the National Movement Against Terrorism (NMAT). The Sihala Urumaya evolved into the Jathika Hela Urumaya (JHU), fielding Buddhist priests in the 2004 parliamentary elections and supporting UPFA candidate Mahinda Rajapaksa in the 2005 presidential elections. In the 2015 presidential elections, Ranawaka supported Maithripala Sirisena and the JHU later joined the United National Party-led alliance, the UNFGG.

=== Member of Parliament ===
Thereafter it becomes a partner in the Rajapaksa government in 2007. With it one of its Buddhist members of parliament/priest, Omalpe Thero, resigned and his place was taken by Ranawaka as a national list MP (appointed by the party and not elected) who was thereafter appointed Cabinet Minister of Environment and Natural Resources by Rajapaksa.

Ranawaka contested the 2010 General Election under the UPFA from Colombo District and was placed third place by obtaining 120,333 votes securing membership in the Sri Lanka Parliament and appointed to Minister of Power and Energy. In 2015 General Election Ranawaka contested under UNP from Colombo District. He was appointed the Minister of Megapolis and Western Development. He resigned on 18 November 2019.

=== Allegations of racism ===
In 2008 Ranawaka called the Muslim community in Sri Lanka 'outsiders' sparking widespread protests.

In 2012, Ranawaka warned the Tamil people that they would receive a hundred Mullivaikkals if they continued to support the TNA self determination policies. He stated:

"One Mullivaikkal is enough. Don't try to get 100 more."

=== Criticism of international interventions ===
Ranawaka has also been critical of international intervention in Sri Lanka stating that anyone who takes action against Sri Lanka will be supporting terrorism. In April 2011 Ranawaka called the United Nations' report on alleged war crimes in Sri Lanka 'diplomatic terrorism'. Ranwaka has also opposed airstrikes against Libya.

=== Arrest ===
On 18 December 2019, he was arrested regarding his alleged involvement in a hit and run case injuring two people in 2016. He is alleged to have been connected to the abduction of family members of a major witness. He was summoned in the Magistrate court the same day he was arrested and was initially remanded until 19 December 2019. He was further ordered by the court to be remanded until 24 December 2019.

== Books ==
- 1991– End of Modern Development Paradigm (club of Rome) limit to growth elaboration in sustainable development.
- 1993– Relational Relativity.
- Sihala Abhiyogaya (The Challenge of the Sinhalese)
- Koti Viniwideema (An insight of the LTTE ) Book Pre-view Book Download
- Nagenahira Sinhala Urumaya (Sinhala Heritage in the East) Book Pre-view Book Download
- Thrastha Virodi Jathika Salasma (The way to defeat the Tiger) Pre-view Book Download
- Al Jihad- Al Queida (The past, present & the future of Islamic fundamentalism) Pre-view
- Sangwardanaye Thunveni Yamaya (The Sunset of Development) Pre-view Book Download
- Patisothagamiwa Tis Wasak (A self written Autobiography) Pre-view Book Download

== Electoral history ==
Electoral history of Patali Champika Ranawaka
Election	Constituency	Party	Alliance	Votes	Result
2010 parliamentary	Colombo District	Jathika Hela Urumaya	United People's Freedom Alliance	120,333	Elected
2015 parliamentary	Colombo District	Jathika Hela Urumaya	United National Front for Good Governance	100,444	Elected
2020 parliamentary	Colombo District	Jathika Hela Urumaya	Samagi Jana Balawegaya	65,574	Elected

== See also ==
- Cabinet of Sri Lanka
