= Athurugiriya =

Athurugiriya අතුරුගිරිය அத்துருகிரிய
- Suburb
- Motto: Colombo
- Location within Colombo District
- Coordinates: 6°53′32″N 79°56′34″E
- Country: Sri Lanka
- Province: Western Province
- District: Colombo District
- Elevation: 30 m (98 ft)

Population
  - Suburb: 84,278
  - Urban: 5,799
  - Metro: 78,479
- Time zone: UTC+5:30 (SLT)
- Postal Code: 10150

Athurugiriya is a suburb of Colombo District, Sri Lanka. It is situated on the Kotte-Bope Road (B 240) about 21 km (13 mi) away from the centre of the commercial capital Colombo. This suburb is a highly sought after residential centre in Colombo.

== History ==
The history of the area dates back to at least 212 BC. The historic cave temple complex, Korathota Raja Maha Vihara, is located 3 km (1.9 mi) north of the city centre. This temple has two Brahmi inscriptions and one of them records that a cave at the site was offered to Maha Sanga (Buddhist monks) by a daughter of Mahachula Mahatissa. The second one says one cave was offered to Maha Sanga by a provincial leader called Sumana.

== Transport ==
Athurugiriya has one of the interchanges of Outer Circular Expressway, which is located at Pore, about 1 km (0.62 mi) from Colombo centre.

Athurugiriya is a major urban centre located along the road connecting Malabe on New Kandy Road, and Godagama on High Level Road. In addition, Kaduwela and Thalawathugoda are major urban centres nearby.

== Residential ==
Athurugiriya is a highly sought after residential area in Colombo. Many important government office complexes; such as Sethsiripaya, Suhurupaya, Isurupaya and many other government institutions in Denzil Kobbekaduwa Mawatha; are situated within 10 km (6.2 mi) of Athurugiriya.

Upper-middle class housing complex Millennium City is located within 1 km (0.62 mi) from Athurugiriya.

== See also ==
- Millennium City incident
