= Diyawanna Lake =

Lake in Sri Lanka

- දියවන්නා ඔය (Sinhala)
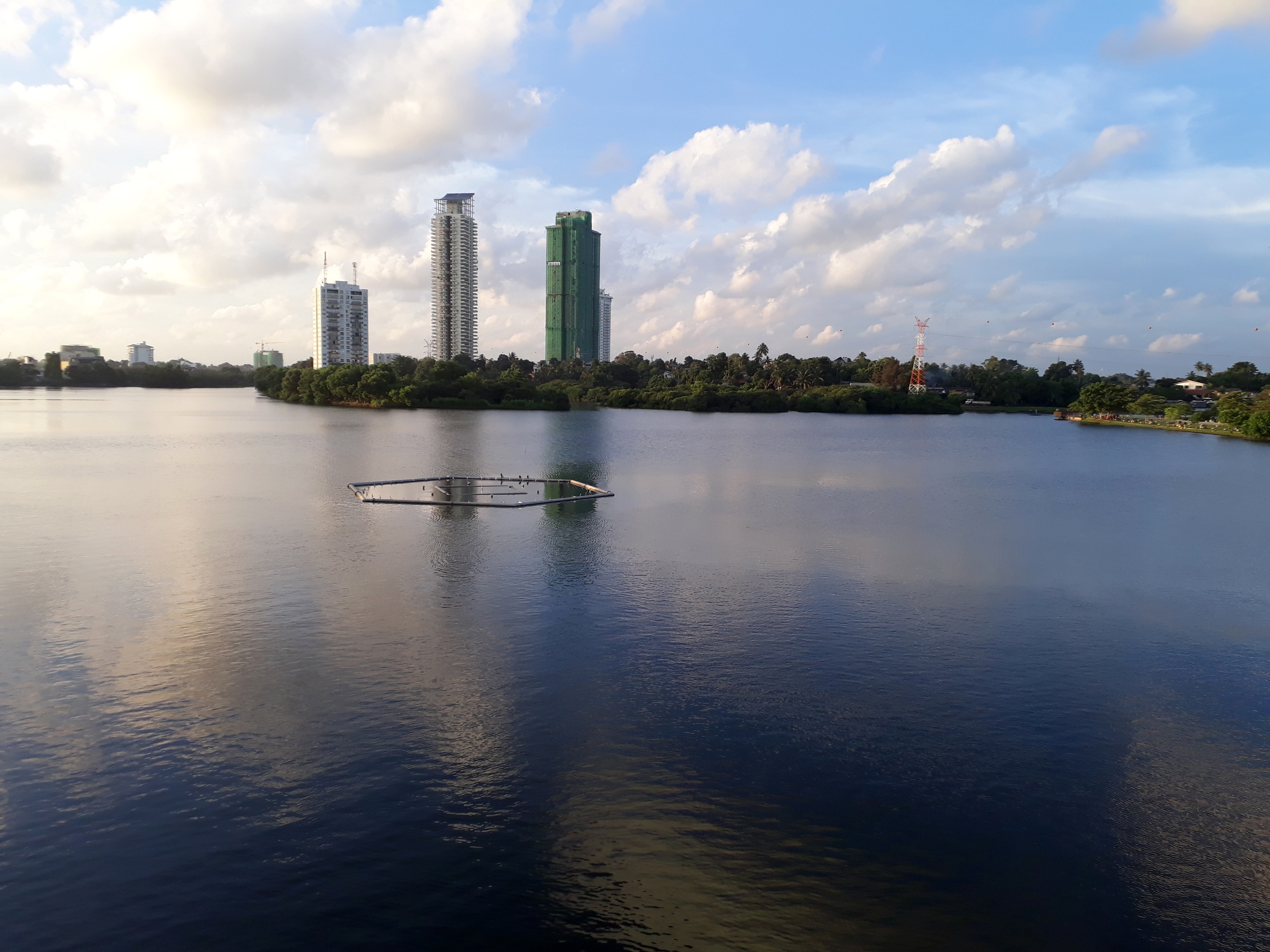
- The lake in October 2017.

- Location within Sri Lanka
- Coordinates: 06°53′12″N 79°55′15″E
- Basin countries: Sri Lanka
- Islands: 8
- Sections/sub-basins: 3
- Settlements: Sri Jayawardenepura Kotte

Diyawanna Lake (Sinhala: දියවන්නා ඔය, Tamil: தியவன்ன ஓயா) or Parliament Lake, is one of the lakes within Sri Jayawardenepura Kotte, Sri Lanka.

It is quite popular as the Sri Lankan Parliament Building was built on an artificial island at the centre of the lake. The Diyatha Uyana park is also located on the banks of this lake. This lake was created in 1979 and has eight islands.

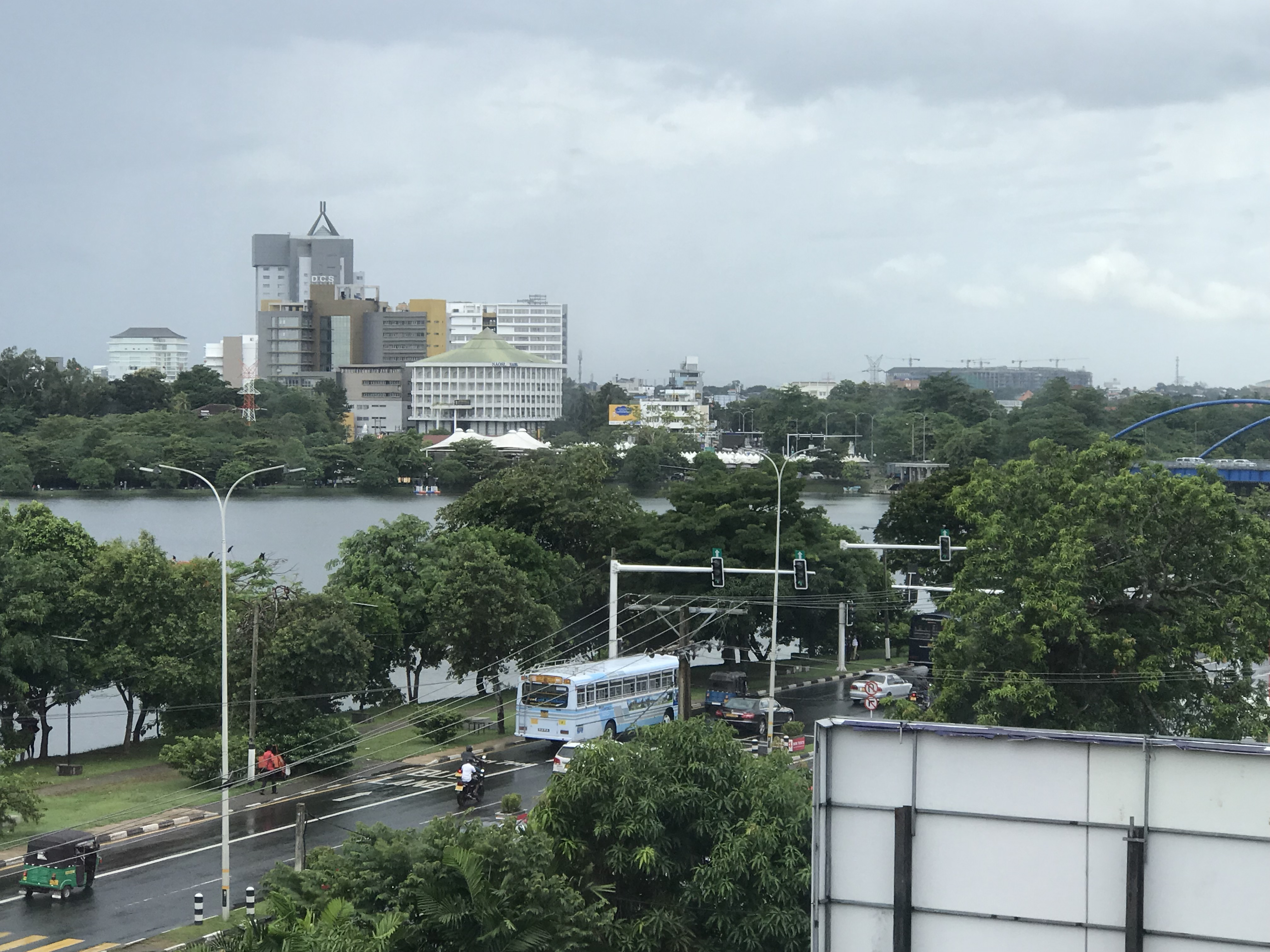
View of Battaramulla, from the shore of Diyawanna Lake

== See also ==
- Geography of Sri Lanka
