= Malabe =

Malabe මාළබේ மாலபே
- Suburb
- Location within Sri Lanka
- Coordinates: 6°54′13″N 79°57′17″E
- Country: Sri Lanka
- Province: Western Province
- District: Colombo District
- Elevation: 28 m (92 ft)
- Time zone: UTC+5:30 (SLT)
- Postal Code: 10115

Malabe (Sinhala: මාළබේ, Tamil: மாலபே) is a former town, now a suburb of Kaduwela in the Colombo District, Sri Lanka. It is situated on the New Kandy Road (Kaduwela Road) about 10 km (6.2 mi) away from the centre of the commercial capital Colombo. This suburb is a crucial economic centre in Colombo.

It is administered by the Kaduwela Municipal Council

== Etymology ==
The name ‘Malabe’, is believed to be derived from the classical Sinhala name මහ ලැහැඹ Maha Lahamba, meaning "the large forest".

== Industries ==
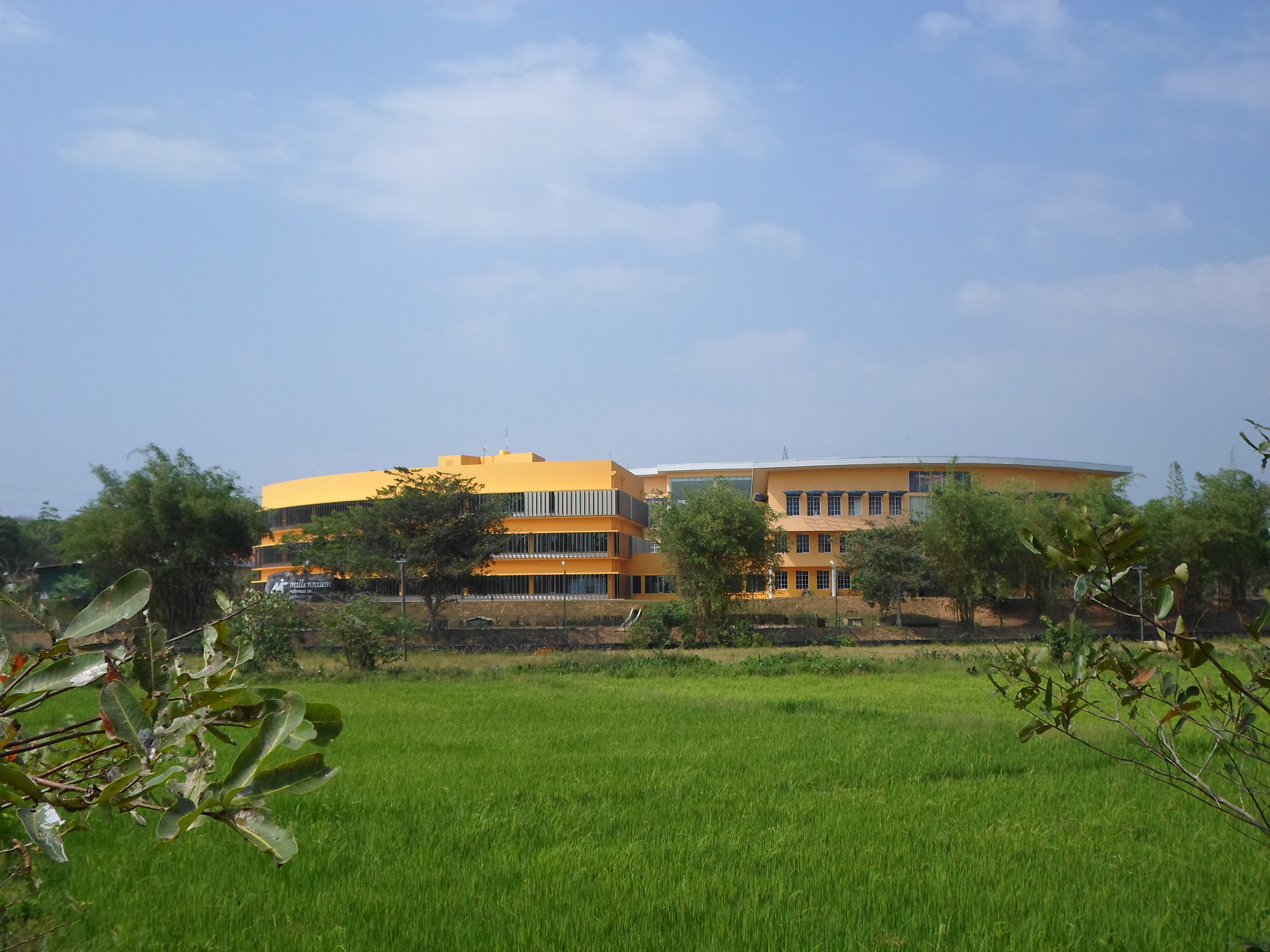
LSEG premises in Malabe.

Malabe is the home to the MillenniumIT (known as Millennium Information Technologies or MIT), a Sri Lankan-based information technology firm that specialises in electronic trading systems and a fully owned technology business sector of London Stock Exchange Group, SPAR.

== Education ==
There is a number of state and private schools in Malabe and there are several private degree-awarding institutes.

=== Private Higher Education Institutes ===
- Sri Lanka Institute of Information Technology
- CINEC Maritime Campus
- Horizon Campus

=== Schools ===
- Malabe Boys Model School
- Sri Rahula Balika Maha Vidyalaya
- Horizon International School
- Sussex International School

== Demographics ==
Malabe is a Sinhala majority area; there are minor communities belonging to other ethnic groups, such as Moors and Tamils. Malabe has some Buddhist religious places of the Sinhalese belonging to the Theravada school which includes the local branch of the Mahamevnawa Buddhist Monastery

== Transportation ==
New Kandy Road from Ethul Kotte to Balummahara via Malabe, Kaduwela, Weliweriya and extending to Kandy along A1 highway.

=== Other means ===
- A proposed Multi-modal transport hub is to be constructed to link the city to the Colombo Monorail and BRT.
- Malabe is located near the entrance to the Outer-circular Expressway Kaduwela interchange.

== Suburbs ==
- Ambatale
- Kaduwela
- Battaramulla
- Athurugiriya
- Sri Jayawardenapura Kotte
- Hokandara
