= Millennium City incident =

The Millennium City Scandal refers to a military scandal that took place within the Millennium City housing scheme, Athurugiriya, Sri Lanka on 2 January 2002. Widespread media coverage and miscommunication between the Directorate of Military Intelligence and the Sri Lanka Police resulted in the exposure of military covert operations units known as the Long Range Reconnaissance Patrols of the Sri Lanka Army. Identities of its members were classified and known to only to a few high-ranking military officers and the President of Sri Lanka.

== Incident ==
On 2 January 2002, a special team of Sri Lanka Police led by Superintendent of Police (Special Operations, Kandy district), Kulasiri Udugampola, raided a safe house maintained by the Directorate of Military Intelligence (DMI) of the Sri Lanka Army at Millennium City housing scheme: No. 844, Kaduwela road, Athurugiriya. The police team arrested five Army soldiers, including a Captain (Captain Shahul Hameed Nilam, Commanding Officer of the LRRP) and one paramilitary member, a former cadre of the Liberation Tigers of Tamil Eelam (LTTE) under the Prevention of Terrorism Act (which made up for the lack of a court order or warrant). They also recovered a cache of military equipment including land mines, light anti-tank weapons (LAW), assault rifles, thermobaric weapons and 66 LTTE uniforms. SP Udugampola immediately invited local media and presented the police findings.

This incident occurred immediately after the Parliamentary election of December 2001, in which United National Front came into power, defeating the incumbent People's Alliance government. The safe house was presented to the public as a hideout from which the army purportedly planned to assassinate high-level leaders of the United National Party, including then Prime Minister Ranil Wickremesinghe. The allegation was first made by UNP chairman Charitha Ratwatte and vice chairman Daya Pelpola, in November 2001, before the election. They alleged that thermobaric weapons had been brought from the Army's operational areas in the North to the Panaluwa Army testing range, in order to use them at a UNP election meeting. This allegation was later proved to be false.

=== Efforts to avoid the situation ===
Soon after the raid, the Sri Lanka Army Commander Lionel Balagalle, dispatched Director of the Directorate of Military Intelligence, Brigadier Kapila Hendavithana, to the scene of the raid in order to explain the situation to the police and avoid a crisis situation for the Army. He also contacted the Inspector General of Police (IGP) Lakdasa Kodituwakku. Brigadier Hendavithana too then called the IGP, asking for SP Udugampola to call off the investigation. Subsequently, the Inspector General contacted SP Udugampola and asked him to take into consideration what the Army's intelligence chief was saying. SP Udugampola then contacted Minister of Internal Affairs, John Amaratunga to brief him the situation. The Minister in turn dispatched DIG Lal Ratnayake to the scene. Not withstanding the Army's protests and the request made by his superiors, SP Udugampola, for reasons not made clear, took the soldiers into custody, seized the stock of weapons and drove to the Military Police Headquarters in Narahenpita.

== Reactions ==
Reactions to this incident were mixed. Initially, there was a public outcry in light of the allegations made that the military was planning to assassinate UNP leaders. However, after details about the unit were revealed, the police was accused of compromising national security. The country's military leadership was also blamed for being unable to prevent a "serious breach of national security". The LRRP team had initially been housed at the Kohuwala Army Camp, but was relocated to Athurugiriya in December 2001. Army commander Lionel Balagalla was compelled to issue a public statement revealing the true nature of this unit. President Chandrika Kumaratunga appointed a commission headed by D. Jayawickrema, a retired Judge of the Court of Appeal to inquire into and report on the raid. The report, released in December 2003, labelled Udugampola's action "illegal and immoral". He was demoted to the rank of ASP. A Supreme Court judgement delivered in January 2004 stated that the fundamental rights of the soldiers had been violated and ordered ASP Udugampola to pay a sum of Rs. 50,000 LKR each to five of the LRRP operatives, S. H. Nilam, P. Ananda Udalagama, H. M. Nissanka Herath, I. Edirisinghe Jayamanne and H. Mohamed Hilmy. The State was ordered to pay Rs. 750,000 each to them as well. Action against a number of Sri Lankan Army officers who failed to perform their duty were taken, with the most senior officer among them, Major General Ivan Dassanayake, being ordered to retire from service. Reports further stated that the raid was a "total betrayal and absolute treachery to the nation". In March 2005, ASP Udugampola was indicted and arrested.

== Aftermath ==
Immediately after the incident, through the Criminal Investigation Department and other channels, it was revealed that the safe house was none other than a top secret military establishment. By then, however, vital details regarding the LRRP had been leaked to the media. It was not until 9 January, on the orders of Defence Minister Tilak Marapana, the operatives of the LRRP who were held at the Katugastota Police Station were released. The arrested LTTE cadre was released only on the 11th. All of them had been interrogated. Soon afterwards, the LTTE began a campaign to eliminate the members of the LRRP, and those who were suspected of assisting them. The LTTE Intelligence chief, Shanmugalingam Sivashankar alias Pottu Amman personally traveled to Batticaloa to oversee the "elimination" of the "traitors". The government did not take any significant measures to stop this, and requests made by the state intelligence agencies were quietly subdued on the basis that it would affect the ceasefire.

=== Investigation & Trial ===
The charges were filed against ASP Kulasiri Udugampola by the Attorney General for supposedly endangering national security by publicizing confidential information about military intelligence personnel, safe house and mission thereby putting nation security at risk. On 27 March 2025 after a lengthy trial that spanned nearly two decades, Colombo High Court judge Adithya Patabendi acquitted ASP Udugampola stating that the prosecution failed to prove the charges beyond a reasonable doubt.

== Assassinations ==
The Sunday Times ( February 1, 2004 ) revealed details of intelligence operatives and civilian informants who were closely associated with LRRP operatives by the Directorate of Military Intelligence. They were all tracked down and assassinated by Tiger guerrillas after the existence of the Safe House became public.

January 20, 2002 V. Vidyarnthan alias Vidya alias Nidhi - Informant - Abducted on January 16, 2002 and killed on January 20, 2002.

February 9, 2002 Clary alias Gadaffi Ex- guerrilla cadre - abducted from Chenkallady town and killed.

July 22, 2002 Saundarajah A alias Arinjan Ex-guerrilla cadre - abducted from Batticaloa town on July 3 and killed at Vakarai.

December 11, 2002 Ganeshmoorthy alias Thilakarajah Samithambi Informant - killed by LTTE gun-men in Colombo.

January 3, 2003 Pulendrarasa alias Cashier Ex-guerrilla cadre - abducted in Kallady and killed.

March 18, 2003 Kadiragamthambi Ragupathi alias Ragu Informant - killed by the LTTE gun-men in Colombo.

April 13, 2003 Sinnathambi Rajan alias Varadan Informant - to be enlisted to the Army shot dead by the LTTE pistol group in Colombo.

April 26, 2003 Devarajha L. alias Ashok Ex- LTTE cadre - killed in Colombo.

May 21, 2003 Kumar Perumal Perimban alias Master Ex-PLOTE cadre - killed in Batticaloa town. Besides the above, among intelligence operatives, soldiers, para military troops who were not connected to LRRP operations but were killed after the Safe House activities came to be known were:

August 14, 2002 Kanapathipillai Devadas Tamil soldier - abducted and killed.

December 2, 2002 Aseesh SM Soldier - abducted and killed.

April 23, 2003 Sidambarapilai Yashodaran Tamil soldier - abducted and killed.

May 19, 2003 Sooriyan K Tamil soldier - killed in Batticaloa.

August 3, 2003 LT Rilvan Police Sergeant - abducted and killed in Trincomalee.

August 8, 2003 Vivekanada Sammugarasa SP Tamil soldier - abducted and killed.

September 14, 2003 Saundanayagam Sabarathnam Tamil soldier - killed in Palameenmadu. Among civilian informants (not connected with LRRP operations) but killed after activities of the Safe House came to be known were:

March 11, 2002 Pulendrarajha - abducted and killed in Muttur.

July 6, 2002 Thangarajha Premadasa alias Varuman - killed with his mistress in Welikanda.

March 20, 2003 Nagoorkanee Ashish - abducted and killed.

April 13, 2003 Subramaniyam Jayadewan - killed in Batticaloa.

April 23, 2003 Sellaiya Puvendrarasa - killed in Thunnalai.

May 16, 2003 Ariyanandan Hemachandran - Killed in Jaffna.

July 17, 2003 Abdul Bahir Fauzi - Killed in Uppuveli.

August 30, 2003 Sebamalai Vimalkumaran - killed in Vavuniya. Erambamurthi Sabanayagam - Abducted in Matale and killed in Batticaloa.

=== LRRP operatives in the aftermath ===
Following the incident, Captain S. H. Nilam, the commanding officer of the LRRP, and his family was reported as missing. Later, it was revealed that they were sent to the Sri Lankan Embassy in Indonesia for their safety. In 2007, he and his family disappeared from Indonesia too.

The LTTE has, since then, assassinated more than 80 Tamil informants and Intelligence officers of Sri Lanka Army, whose identity had been compromised. The Sunday Times defence columnist Iqbal Athas, in February 2004 revealed the names of 24 Tamil informants who had fallen victim to the LTTE's scourge. V. Vidyarnthan alias Vidya alias Nidhi alias Mike was the most important of them, having been abducted on 16 January 2002, and killed after being subjected to torture and intense interrogation for four days. He dealt directly with Captain Nilam before the incident. Mike in turn liaised with a network of operatives as well as informants, including one time guerrilla cadres, in the Batticaloa and Ampara districts. The most senior officer to be killed since then was Lieutenant Colonel Tuan Nizam Muthaliff. He was the Commanding Officer of the 1st Battalion, Military Intelligence Corps, serving as the second-in-command under Captain Nilam, when the incident occurred. Kandiah Yogarasa alias PLOTE Mohan, another key informant, was shot dead by the LTTE in July 2004.

== See also ==
- Long Range Reconnaissance Patrol (Sri Lanka)
