= J. R. P. Suriyapperuma =

Sri Lankan politician (1928–2025)

The Honourable J. R. P. Suriyapperuma

Member of Parliament for National List
- In office 22 April 2010 – 26 June 2015

Personal details
- Born: 8 June 1928 Gampaha, British Ceylon
- Died: 2 January 2025 (aged 96) Colombo, Sri Lanka
- Party: Sri Lanka Freedom Party
- Other political affiliations: United National Party
- Occupation: Politics
- Profession: Politician, University Professor

J. R. P. Suriyapperuma (8 June 1928 – 2 January 2025) was a Sri Lankan politician who was a National List member of the Parliament of Sri Lanka.

Suriyapperuma was the chief organiser of the Dedigama electorate in the Kegalle District for the Sri Lanka Freedom Party.

Suriyapperuma died in Colombo on 2 January 2025, at the age of 96.
