= Ministry of Megapolis and Western Development =

Government ministry of Sri Lanka

Minister of Megapolis and Western Development of Sri Lanka
- Incumbent; Ministry dissolved since 21 November 2019
- Ministry of Megapolis and Western Development
- Appointer: The president on advice of the prime minister
- Inaugural holder: Champika Ranawaka
- Formation: 4 September 2015
- Succession: 21 November 2019 as Ministry of Urban Development, Water Supply & Housing Facilities
- Website: megapolismin.gov.lk

Ministry of Megapolis and Western Development (Sinhala: මහානගර හා බස්නාහිර සංවර්ධන අමාත්‍යාංශය Mahanagara Ha Basnahira Sanvardhana Amathyanshaya) was an appointment in the Cabinet of Sri Lanka formulated by Ranil Wickremesinghe government that came into power in August 2015 elections of Sri Lanka. The ministry was in charge of discovering solutions to resolve the garbage, housing of shanty dwellers issues as well drawing new traffic plans to avoid traffic jams in busy towns. The ministry planned to develop new cities in Bandaragama, Kadawatha, Kottawa and Kerawalapitiya surrounding the outer circular that was to come under construction as a part of the megapolis development plan.

The state institutions came under the purview of the ministry were National Physical Planning Department, Urban Development Authority and Sri Lanka Land Reclamation and Development Corporation.

The ministry was trying to establish a Megapolis Authority under a parliamentary act, to plan the development activities of the Western Province. These will be implemented through the provincial council, local councils and the Urban Development Authority, but was not able to get it done during its time. On 21 November 2019, The Ministry of Megapolis and Western Development was dissolved and the institutions came under it was assigned to newly formed "Ministry of Urban Development, Water Supply and Housing Facilities" which is governed by Prime Minister Mahinda Rajapakse

== List of megapolis and western development ministers ==
Parties

Sri Lanka Freedom Party Jathika Hela Urumaya

Name	Portrait	Party	Tenure	President
Champika Ranawaka	Ranil Wickremesinghe	Jathika Hela Urumaya	4 September 2015 – 21 November 2019	Maithripala Sirisena
