= Kaduwela, Western Province =

Kaduwela කඩුවෙල கடுவெலை
- City
- Location within Colombo District
- Coordinates: 6°56′8″N 79°59′2″E
- Country: Sri Lanka
- Province: Western Province
- District: Colombo District

Area
  - Total: 87.71 km^{2} (33.87 sq mi)

Population (2009)
  - Total: 244,679
- Time zone: UTC+5:30 (Sri Lanka Standard Time)
- Postal code: 10640
- Website: www.kaduwela.mc.gov.lk

Kaduwela (Sinhala: කඩුවෙල, Tamil: கடுவெலை) is the largest city in Sri Lanka by land area, covering 87.71 km^{2} (33.87 sq mi). The city is composed of three divisions called Kaduwela, Battaramulla and Athurugiriya and is located in the Colombo District, Western Province, Sri Lanka. Kaduwela Town (located in Kaduwela Division) is located about 16 km (9.9 mi) from the Colombo city centre on the Colombo - Avissawella Old Road (Low Level Road) and about 18 km (11 mi) from Kollupitiya on the New Kandy Road from Ethulkotte to Kandy.

== Etymology ==
Kaduwela was originally Kadudevola, a compound of Kadu (sword) and Devola (shrine). It was the location of a shrine of the goddess Pattini, linked to a golden sword used in the 'water cutting' ritual. The shrine is called the Purana Rankadu Pattini Maha Devale (ancient great shrine of the golden-sword Pattini).

In another possibility Kaduwela simply means the jungle paddy field. Kadu means jungle (Sorata Thera's Sinhala–Sinhala dictionary) and wela means paddy field. There is also another Kaduwela in the Ukuwela division of Matale district

According to Robert Percival of the 19th Regiment of Foot, during the Revolt of 1797 against the Dutch, the Sinhalese threw up earthworks and established a fort here.

After the British defeat in the 1st Kandyan War, Kaduwela was occupied by a small force of British sepoys and lascoreens. They were later reinforced by a mixed force of European troops and sepoys under Captain Charles Wilkinson Mercer of the 51st Regiment, prior to the Battle of Hanwella.

== Demographics ==
Kaduwela DS Division has the largest Sinhalese population by all DS Divisions of Sri Lanka and 2nd largest Buddhist population after Homagama DS Division in Sri Lanka according to census 2012. According to the census of 2012 the demographics by ethnicity and religion is as follows:.

Religious & Ethnic Identification in Kaduwela Municipality area
	2012	Percentage
Buddhist	227,954	90.44%
Roman Catholic	12,520	4.97%
Other Christian	3,879	1.54%
Islam	3,735	1.48%
Hindu	3,524	1.40%
Other	445	0.18%
Total	252,057	100.00%
Sinhalese	241,104	95.65%
Sri Lankan Tamil	4,605	1.83%
Sri Lankan Moor	2,011	0.80%
Burgher	1,194	0.47%
Other	1,164	0.46%
Malay	1,106	0.44%
Indian Tamil	740	0.29%
Sri Lankan Chetty	82	0.03%
Baratha	51	0.02%
Total	252,057	100.00%

== See also ==
- List of towns in Western Province, Sri Lanka
