= List of monorail systems =

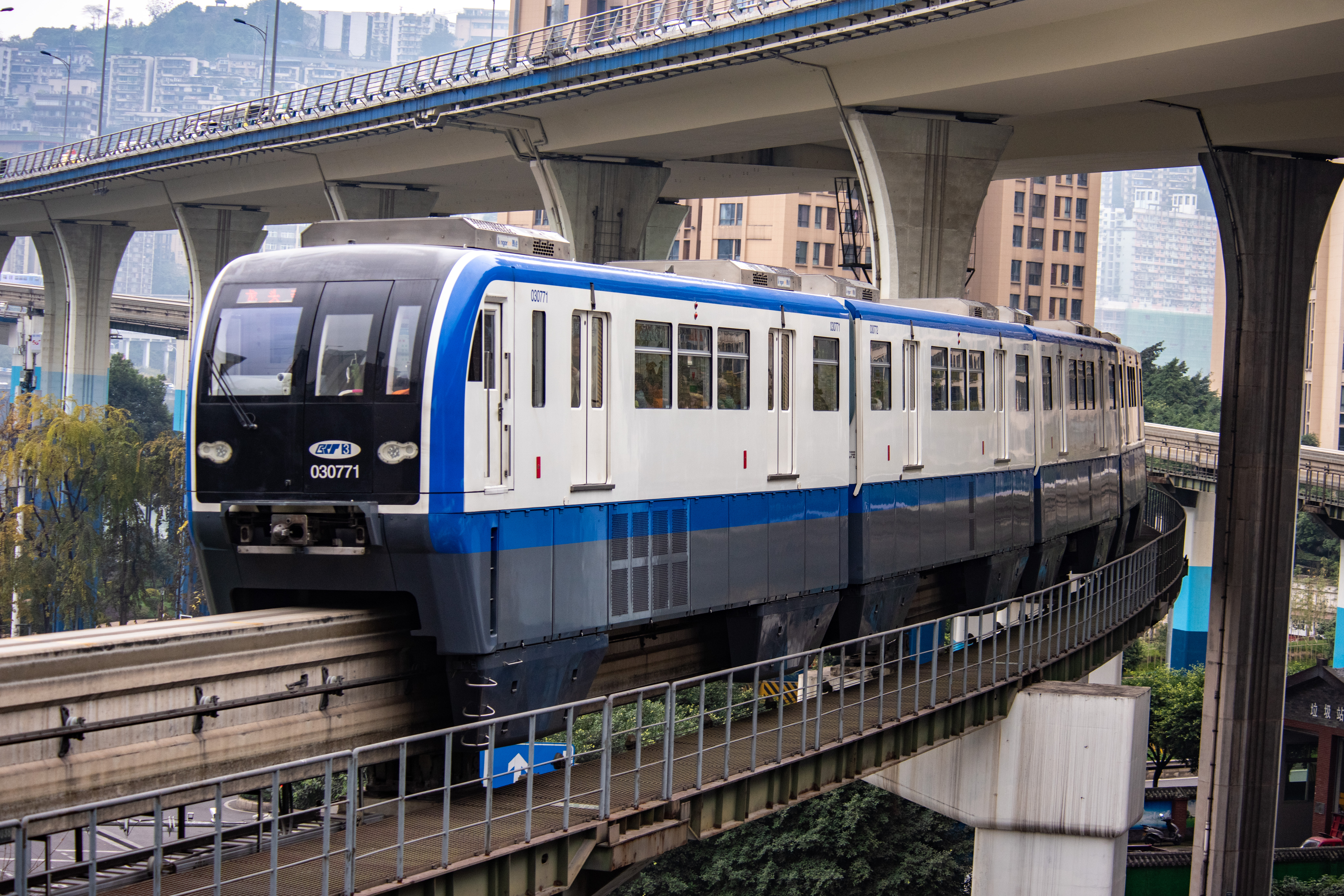
A Chongqing Rail Transit monorail train. Line 3 is the world's longest and busiest monorail line.

A monorail is a railway system in which the track consists of a single elevated rail, beam or track with the trains either supported or suspended. The term is also used to describe the beam of the system, or the vehicles traveling on such a beam or track. Many monorail systems run through crowded areas that would otherwise require expensive tunneling or dangerous level crossings. Aside from mass transit and people mover systems, a large number of smaller monorails have been built in amusement parks and at zoos.

== Operational monorails ==
These are lists of operating monorails that are open to the public. Only true monorails (vehicle wider than track) are included; see people mover for a list of monorail-like systems. There are also other monorail type systems used for human transportation not included, such as slope cars, mining monorails and farm monorails.

=== Operational monorails – transit, people movers ===
Systems used primarily for passenger transportation, characterised by enclosed cars, multiple stations and open on a regular basis. Monorails associated with amusement parks that have enclosed cabins and multiple stations are generally included here.

Location	Country	Name	Opened	Stations	Length	Type	Construction type
São Paulo	Brazil	Line 15 (São Paulo Metro)	2014	11	14.6 km (9.1 mi)	Urban	Straddle-beam Innovia Monorail 300
São Paulo	Brazil	Line 17 (São Paulo Metro)	2026	8	7.2 km (4.5 mi)	Urban	Straddle-beam BYD SkyRail
Beijing	China	Line S1 (Beijing Subway)	2017	8	10 km (6.2 mi)	Urban	Maglev
Changsha	China	Changsha Maglev Express	2016	3	18.6 km (11.6 mi)	Urban	Maglev
Chongqing	China	Line 2 & Line 3, Chongqing Rail Transit	2005	70	96.5 km (60.0 mi)	Urban	Straddle-beam Hitachi Large
Chongqing	China	Airport Monorail APM Line	2025	2	2.36 km (1.47 mi)	Airport (airside)	Straddle-beam Hitachi Large
Fenghuang	China	Fenghuang Maglev	2022	4	9.121 km (5.668 mi)	People mover (tourist-type)	Maglev
Shanghai	China	Shanghai maglev train	2002	2	30.5 km (19.0 mi)	High speed	Maglev Transrapid
Wuhan	China	Optics Valley Suspended Monorail	2023	6	10.5 km (6.5 mi)	People mover (tourist-type)	Suspended SAFEGE
Wuhu	China	Wuhu Rail Transit	2021	36	46.2 km (28.7 mi)	Urban	Straddle-beam Innovia Monorail 300
Yinchuan	China	Yinchuan SkyRail Line 1	2018	8	5.67 km (3.52 mi)	Other	Straddle-beam BYD SkyRail
Cairo	Egypt	East Nile Monorail	2026	22	56.5 km (35.1 mi)	Urban	Straddle-beam Innovia Monorail 300
Dortmund	Germany	H-Bahn Dortmund	1984	4	3.16 km (1.96 mi)	People mover	Suspended SIEPEM
Dresden	Germany	Dresden Suspension Railway	1901	2	0.27 km (0.17 mi)	Funicular	Suspended Double-flanged
Düsseldorf	Germany	Düsseldorf SkyTrain	2002	4	2.5 km (1.6 mi)	Airport (landside)	Suspended SIEPEM
Rust	Germany	"E.P. Express" Europa-Park	1995	4	2.5 km (1.6 mi)	Amusement park	Straddle steel box beam Von Roll/Adtranz
Wuppertal	Germany	Schwebebahn	1901	20	13.3 km (8.3 mi)	Urban	Suspended Double-flanged
Mumbai	India	Mumbai Monorail	2014	17	19.54 km (12.14 mi)	Urban	Straddle-beam Scomi Rail
Bologna	Italy	Marconi Express Monorail	2020	3	5.1 km (3.2 mi)	People mover	Straddle steel box beam Intamin
Tokyo	Japan	Tokyo Monorail	1964	11	17.8 km (11.1 mi)	Urban	Straddle-beam Hitachi Medium
Naha	Japan	Okinawa Urban Monorail	2003	19	17 km (11 mi)	Urban	Straddle-beam Hitachi Medium
Western Tokyo	Japan	Tama Toshi Monorail Line	1998	19	16 km (9.9 mi)	Urban	Straddle-beam Hitachi Large
Chiba	Japan	Chiba Urban Monorail (2 lines)	1988	18	15.2 km (9.4 mi)	Urban	Suspended SAFEGE
Aichi Prefecture	Japan	Linimo	2005	9	8.9 km (5.5 mi)	Urban	Maglev
Kitakyushu	Japan	Kitakyushu Monorail	1985	13	8.8 km (5.5 mi)	Urban	Straddle-beam Hitachi Large
Kanagawa Prefecture	Japan	Shonan Monorail	1970	8	6.6 km (4.1 mi)	Urban	Suspended SAFEGE
Osaka Prefecture	Japan	Osaka Monorail (2 lines)	1990	18	28 km (17 mi)	Urban	Straddle-beam Hitachi Large
Urayasu	Japan	Disney Resort Line	2001	4	5 km (3.1 mi)	Amusement park	Straddle-beam Hitachi Medium
Kuala Lumpur	Malaysia	Kuala Lumpur Monorail	2003	11	8.6 km (5.3 mi)	Urban	Straddle-beam Hitachi Medium (Scomi Medium)
Singapore	Singapore	Sentosa Express	2007	4	2.1 km (1.3 mi)	People mover (tourist-type)	Straddle-beam Hitachi Small
Daegu	South Korea	Daegu Metro Line 3	2015	30	23.9 km (14.9 mi)	Urban	Straddle-beam Hitachi Large
Incheon	South Korea	Incheon Airport Maglev	2016	6	6.1 km (3.8 mi)	Urban	Maglev
Wolmido	South Korea	Wolmi Sea Train	2019	4	6.1 km (3.8 mi)	People mover (tourist-type)	Straddle three-line rail (originally Inverted T "Urbanaut")
Bangkok	Thailand	Yellow Line & Pink Line	2023	55	65.17 km (40.49 mi)	Urban	Straddle-beam Innovia Monorail 300
Ashgabat	Turkmenistan	Ashgabat Monorail	2016	3	5.2 km (3.2 mi)	People mover	Straddle steel box beam Intamin
Dubai	UAE	Palm Monorail	2009	4	5.45 km (3.39 mi)	Urban	Straddle-beam Hitachi Medium
Alton Towers	UK	Alton Towers Monorail	1987	2	1.4 km (0.87 mi)	Amusement park	Straddle steel box beam Von Roll/Adtranz
Bay Lake, Florida	US	Walt Disney World Monorail System (3 lines)	1971	6	23.66 km (14.70 mi)	Amusement park	Straddle-beam Bombardier M-VI
Las Vegas	US	Las Vegas Monorail	2004	7	6.3 km (3.9 mi)	Urban	Straddle-beam Bombardier M-VI
Newark, New Jersey	US	AirTrain Newark	1996	6	4.8 km (3.0 mi)	Airport (landside)	Straddle steel box beam Von Roll/Adtranz
Anaheim, California	US	Disneyland Monorail	1959	2	4 km (2.5 mi)	Amusement park	Straddle-beam Disneyland-ALWEG
Seattle	US	Seattle Center Monorail	1962	2	1.54 km (0.96 mi)	Urban	Straddle-beam ALWEG Large
Aiea, Hawaii	US	Pearlridge Skycab	1977	2	0.3 km (0.19 mi)	People mover	Straddle Inverted T

=== Operational monorails – sightseeing, amusement park rides, zoo monorails ===
Systems characterised by one station and/or open cabins and that are not primarily for point-to-point transportation. Ordered by country (click headings to re-sort).

Location	Country	Name	Opened	Stations	Length	Type
Lichtaart	Belgium	Bobbejaanland Monorail	1961	3	1.85 km (1.15 mi)	Amusement park
Gramado	Brazil	Aldeia do Papai Noel Monorail	2009	2		Amusement park
Granby	Canada	Granby Zoo monorail	1980	1	2.1 km (1.3 mi)	Zoo
Vaughan	Canada	Treetop Adventure, Canada's Wonderland	1998	1		Amusement park
Shenzhen	China	Window of the World Monorail	1993	3	1.7 km (1.1 mi)	Amusement park
Liupanshui	China	Yeyuhai Monorail	2019	2	5.5 km (3.4 mi)	Other
Ningbo	China	Romon U-Park monorail	2015	2	1.1 km (0.68 mi)	Amusement park
Zhangjiajie	China	Zhangjiajie National Park monorail		2		Other
Xi'an	China	Xi'an Qujiang Sightseeing Monorail	2015	11	9.6 km (6.0 mi)	Other
Xishui	China	Xishui Forest Train	2020	5	11.5 km (7.1 mi)	Other
Shanghai	China	"Ocean Shinkansen" (海洋新干线), Happy Valley Shanghai		1		Amusement park
Shanghai	China	Jinjiang Action Park (two rides)		1 (x two)		Amusement park
Lingshui	China	"Flying to the Sea", Hainan Ocean Paradise	2020	3	1.5 km (0.93 mi)	Amusement park
Fenggang	China				2 km (1.2 mi)	Other
Billund	Denmark	Legoland Billund monorail		1		Amusement park
Helsinki	Finland	Linnanmäki Monorail (Maisemajuna)	1979	1	0.5 km (0.31 mi)	Amusement park
Rang-du-Fliers	France	Parc Bagatelle Monorail	1983	1		Amusement park
Sélestat	France	Walygator Parc monorail	1989	1		Amusement park
Saint-Pourçain-sur-Besbre	France	Voyage over the World, Le Pal	1996	1		Amusement park
Dolancourt	France	Dragons Volants, Nigloland	1996	1		Amusement park
Plailly	France	Espions de César, Parc Astérix	1998	1		Amusement park
Les Avenières	France	Monorail, Walibi Rhône-Alpes	2017	1		Amusement park
Dennebroeucq	France	Xotic, Dennlys Parc	2020	1		Amusement park
Lower Saxony	Germany	"Einschienenbahn", Rasti-Land	1978	1		Amusement park
Soltau	Germany	Heide Park	1985	1	1.6 km (0.99 mi)	Amusement park
Rust	Germany	monorail, Europa-Park	1990	2		Amusement park
Heroldsbach	Germany	"Suspension Railway", Thurn Castle Adventure Park		1		Amusement park
Brühl	Germany	Würmling Express, Phantasialand	2010	1		Amusement park
Rust	Germany	Volo da Vinci, Europa-Park	2011	1		Amusement park
Indramayu Regency	Indonesia	Indramayu Monorail	2018	1		Amusement park
Listowel	Ireland	Lartigue Monorail, (Lartigue restoration)	2003	1	1 km (0.62 mi)	Other
Ravenna	Italy	Mirabilandia Monorail	1992	1	1.5 km (0.93 mi)	Amusement park
Lazise	Italy	Panorama Tram, Movieland park	2006	1		Amusement park
Kitakyushu	Japan	Mini Monorail, Itozu no Mori Zoological Park		1		Zoo
Miyoshi, Tokushima	Japan	Oku Iya Valley Tourist Monorail	2006	1	4.6 km (2.9 mi)	Other
Nagano	Japan	Monorail, Johyama Zoo	2012	1	0.11 km (0.068 mi)	Zoo
Nagoya	Japan	Sky View Train, Higashiyama Zoo and Botanical Gardens	1987	2	2 km (1.2 mi)	Zoo
The Hague	Netherlands	Drievliet Amusement Park Monorail	1968	1	0.2 km (0.12 mi)	Amusement park
Hellendoorn	Netherlands	Hellendoorn Amusement Park	1977	1		Amusement park
Rhenen	Netherlands	Ouwehands Zoo	1978	1		Zoo
Kaatsheuvel	Netherlands	The People of Laaf Monorail	1990	1	0.45 km (0.28 mi)	Amusement park
Hardenberg	Netherlands	Slagharen Amusement Park	1978	1		Amusement park
Zator	Poland	Dragon Adventure, Energylandia	2019	1		Amusement park
Zator	Poland	Magic Flying, Energylandia	2017	1		Amusement park
Zator	Poland	Planes, Energylandia	2014	1		Amusement park
St Petersburg	Russia	Around the World, Divo Ostro	2016	1		Amusement park
Yalta	Russia/Ukraine	Dandelion Drift, Dreamwood	2018	1		Amusement park
Salou & Vila-seca	Spain	Coco Piloto, Port Aventura	2011	1		Amusement park
Seville	Spain	Zum-Zum: Las Abejitas, Isla Mágica	2012	1		Amusement park
Johannesburg	South Africa	Johannesburg Exhibition Centre monorail	2010	1		Other
Daejon	South Korea	National Science Museum Maglev Train	1993	1	1 km (0.62 mi)	Other
Mudeungsan	South Korea	Mudeungsan Monorail		2		Other
Guanxi	Taiwan	Flying Horse, Leofoo Village Theme Park		1		Amusement park
Dashu District, Kaohsiung	Taiwan	E-DA Theme Park Monorail	2010	2		Amusement park
Pattaya	Thailand	Pattaya Park Beach Resort Monorail		1		Amusement park
Thanyaburi, Pathum Thani	Thailand	Dream World Monorail		1		Amusement park
Dubai	UAE	Adventure Time - The Ride of OOO, IMG Worlds of Adventure	2016	1		Amusement park
Beaulieu, Hampshire	UK	National Motor Museum Monorail	1974	2	1.6 km (0.99 mi)	Amusement park
Flamingo Land	UK	Flamingo Land Zoo Monorail	1984	1		Zoo
Great Yarmouth Pleasure Beach	UK	Great Yarmouth Pleasure Beach Monorail	1987	1		Amusement park
Flamingo Land	UK	Flamingo Land People Moover	1990	2		Amusement park
Ingoldmells	UK	Toucan Tours, Fantasy Island	1995	1		Amusement park
Staffordshire	UK	Get Set Go Tree Top Adventure, Alton Towers	1996	1		Amusement park
Romsey	UK	Queen's Flying Coach, Paultons Park	2018	1		Amusement park
Fazeley	UK	Winston's Whistle Stop Tour, Drayton Manor Theme Park	2013	1		Amusement park
Lancaster, Pennsylvania	US	Dutch Wonderland	1966	1		Amusement park
Ocean City, New Jersey	US	Gillians Wonderland Pier MonoRail	1965	1		Amusement park
Sacramento, California	US	Cal Expo Monorail	1968	2	4 km (2.5 mi)	Amusement park
Hershey, Pennsylvania	US	Hersheypark Monorail	1969	1		Amusement park
New York, New York	US	"Wild Asia Monorail" Bronx Zoo	1977	1	2.6 km (1.6 mi)	Zoo
Marshall, Wisconsin	US	Little Amerricka monorail	1990s	1		Amusement park
Wildwood, New Jersey	US	Flying Galleons, Morey's Piers	1997	1		Amusement park
Gilroy, California	US	"Sky Trail Monorail", Gilroy Gardens	2001	1		Amusement park
Jefferson, New Hampshire	US	The Skyway Sleigh, Santa's Village		1		Amusement park
Fairfield, Ohio	US	Jungle Jim's International Market Monorail	2014	2	0.55 km (0.34 mi)	Other
Amarillo	US	Sky Rider, Wonderland Park (Texas)		1	~800 ft (240 m)	Amusement park
Allentown, Pennsylvania	US	Snoopy's Rocket Express, Dorney Park & Wildwater Kingdom	2011	1		Amusement park
Kansas City, Missouri	US	Snoopy's Rocket Express, Worlds of Fun	2011	1		Amusement park
Shakopee	US	Snoopy's Rocket Express, Valleyfair	2011	1		Amusement park
Doswell	US	Snoopy's Rocket Express Kings Dominion	2013	1		Amusement park
Da Nang	Vietnam	"Sun World Monorail", Asia Park	2016	1	1.8 km (1.1 mi)	Amusement park
Ho Chi Minh City	Vietnam	Đầm Sen Park monorail		1	2 km (1.2 mi)	Amusement park

== Under construction ==
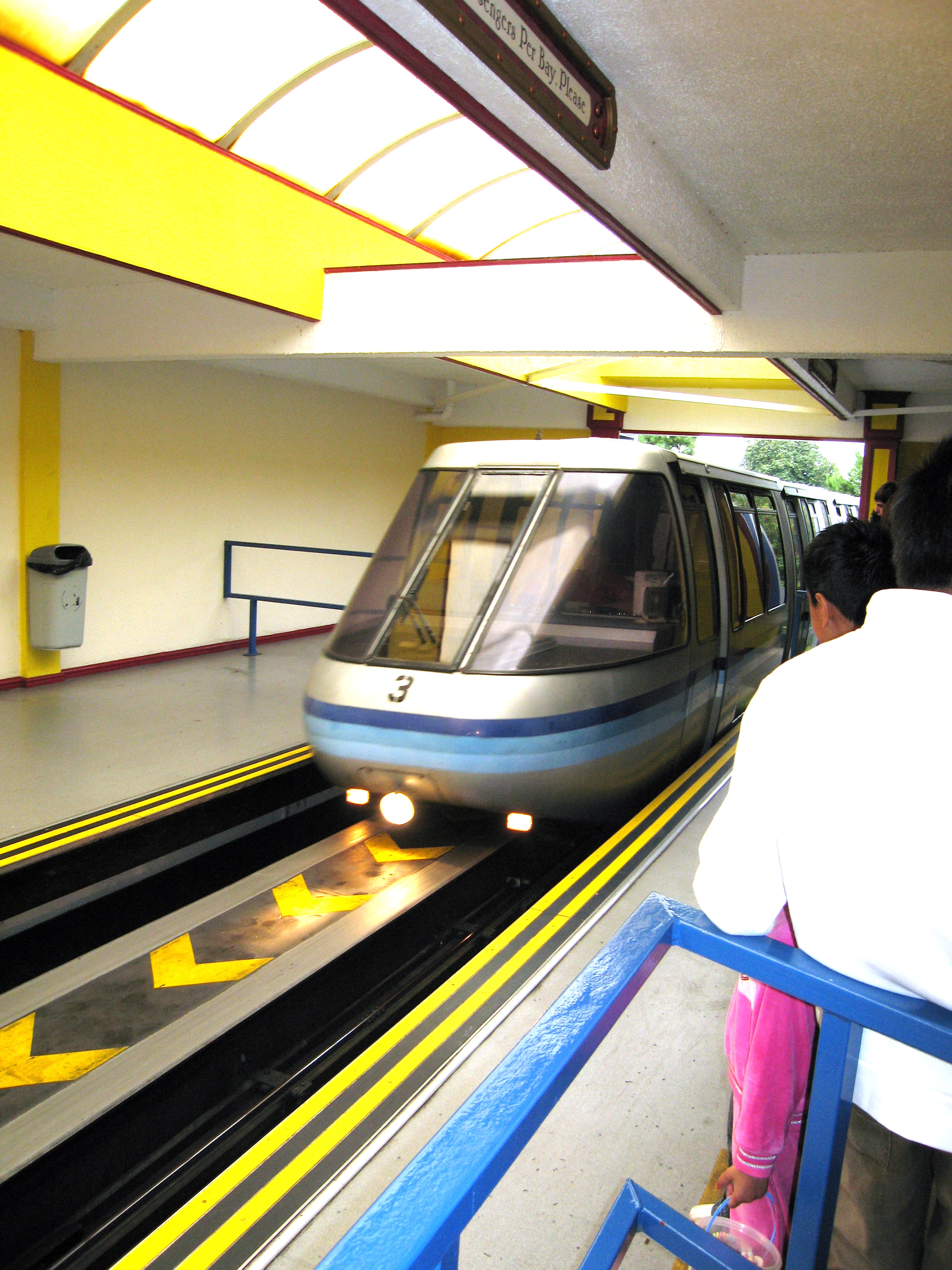
Von Roll monorail at Alton Towers, UK, originally built for Expo 86 in Canada

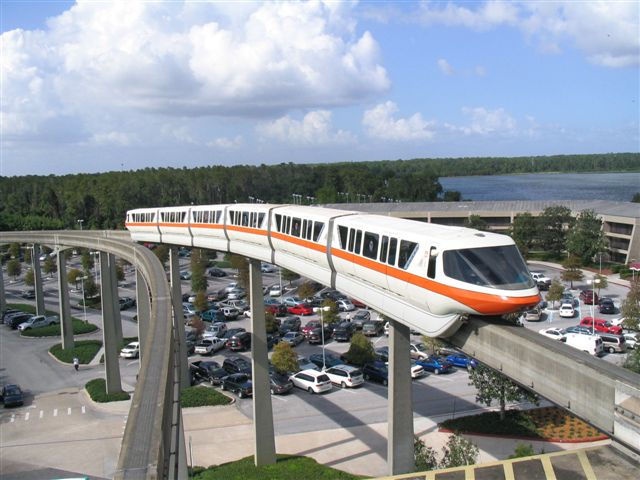
The Walt Disney World Monorail System.

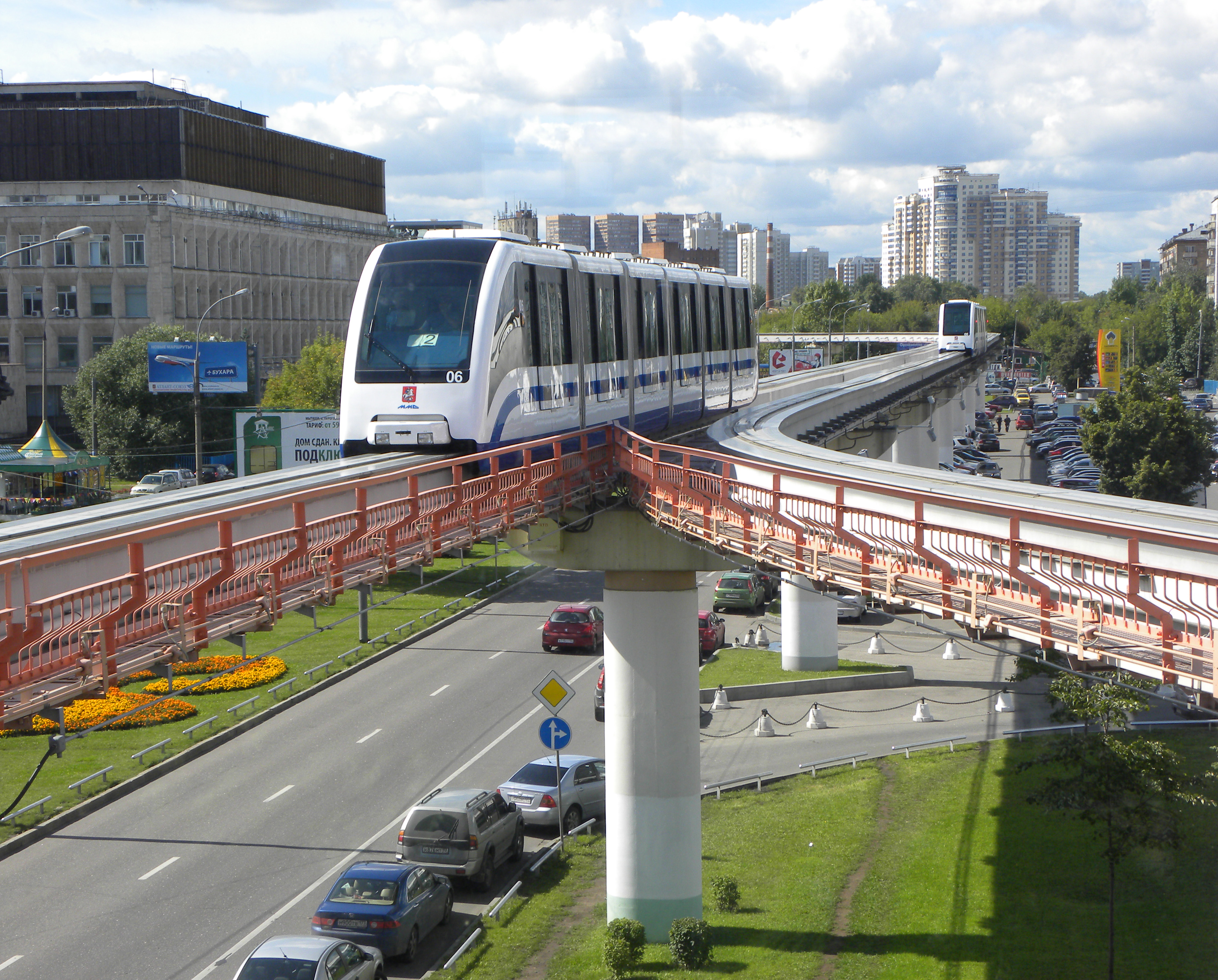
The Moscow Monorail

Physical construction work has started on the following monorails (sorted by opening dates):

=== Africa ===
Country	City	Name of system	Opening	Length	References
Egypt	Cairo	Cairo Monorail	Line 2 opens in 2027	43.8 km	

=== Americas ===
Country	City	Name of system	Opening
Dominican Republic	Santiago de los Caballeros	Santiago Monorail	2026
Mexico	Monterrey	Metrorrey Line 4	2026
Mexico	Monterrey	Metrorrey Line 6	2026
Panama	Panama City	Panama Metro Line 3	2027

=== Asia ===
Country	City/Region	Name of systems	Opening	References
China	Bengbu	Bengbu Metro	scheduled for 2023, construction suspended	
China	Chengdu	Dayi Air-Rail	originally scheduled for 2021, construction suspended	
China	Enshi	Enshi Qingyunya Sightseeing Railway	2021	
China	Guang'an	Guang'an Metro	scheduled for 2020, construction halted	
China	Guilin	Guilin Metro	construction suspended, 1 station completed	
China	Hancheng	Simaqianci to Guchengnanmen	unknown (construction began November 2016)	
China	Liuzhou	Liuzhou Metro	scheduled for 2022, demolished (with 1 station being finished)	
China	Qingyuan	Qingyuan Maglev	2024	
China	Shandong	Qufu to Zoucheng	construction halted 2018, 50% complete	
India	Dholera	Ahemdabad Dholera SIR Monorail	unknown	
Saudi Arabia	Riyadh	KAFD monorail	unknown	

== Proposed monorails ==
Maglev proposals can be found on the list of maglev train proposals.

=== Africa ===
==== Algeria ====
Proposals have been made in the city of Algiers in 2023, construction will start in early 2026.

==== South Africa ====
Several proposals have been made for a Monorail system in South Africa including one in Johannesburg metropolitan area, one in Durban and one in Cape Town.

=== Americas ===
==== Cayman Islands ====
In 2022 a monorail was proposed by members of the public to the island administration that monorail could be a method to help with traffic problems gripping the U.K. Overseas Territory of the Cayman Islands.

==== Mexico ====
- Metrorrey Lines 4, 5 and 6, Monterrey metropolitan area, Nuevo Leon. In August 2022, the acting Secretary of Mobility and Urban Planning of Nuevo Leon announced via press conference that an elevated monorail system was being considered for lines 4, 5 and 6 of the Metrorrey metro system. He also said that the procurement process is currently open to all types of mass transportation options and that there are currently 34 companies interested in submitting a formal proposal. Construction of the new lines is expected to begin on August 31, 2022.

==== United States ====
- San Fernando Valley to LAX via the Sepulveda Pass, Los Angeles, California. In July 2021 a pre-development agreement was signed with the SkyRail Consortium. (A competing pre-development agreement for a subway was also signed. A selection will be made between these options after the pre-development work is complete.)
- Miami to Miami Beach, Florida. Funding to commence planning was approved in October 2020
- Frederick, Maryland, to Shady Grove Metro Station, Maryland, "I-270 Monorail". A feasibility study was released in February 2021 by the Maryland DOT.
- Columbus, Ohio. To run along the High Street corridor to link Rickenbacker International Airport with Downtown.

==== Panama ====
- Panama Metro Line 9, Panama. Announced in 2016 as part of master plan. In 2018 it was reported the line will be built.

==== Venezuela ====
- TELMAG, Line Caracas – La Guaira, Venezuela. The TELMAGV is an ongoing research project which was born in the Instituto Venezolano de Investigaciones Científicas (IVIC) in 1967, and later continued by the Universidad de Los Andes, Venezuela. The TELMAG is a ground mass transport system that does not require mechanical friction for drive and guidance as conventional trains do.

=== Asia ===
==== Bangladesh ====
- Chittagong Monorail

==== China ====
- Zunyi rapid transit system. Approved in 2019. Two lines with 19 stations (22.86 km (14.20 mi)) and 19 stations (27 km (17 mi))

==== India ====
- Ahmedabad–Dholera SIR Monorail, Gujarat, Approved January 2021. Opening 2–3 years after construction starts.
- Chennai Monorail
- Aizawl Monorail, On paper since 2012.
- Coimbatore Monorail
- Madurai Monorail, On paper since 2014.
- Mumbai Maglev, a 2007 proposal, revived in 2020, for a 55 km (34 mi) elevated line to connect Chhatrapati Shivaji Terminus (CSTM) and Panvel with a branch line to Navi Mumbai International Airport.
- Tiruchirappalli Monorail, On paper since 2014.
- Warangal Monorail

=== Iran ===
- Qom Metro Line M, construction halted 2016

==== Philippines ====
- Cebu Monorail. Unsolicited PPP (P3) proposal from 2015. Two lines 17.7 km (11.0 mi) and 9.3 km (5.8 mi). Awaiting government approval.
- Davao People Mover, Davao City. Unsolicited PPP (P3) proposal from 2015. As of March 2019, the line is still waiting for government approval as counter proposals had to be considered.
- Manila Metro Rail Transit System Line 4, Manila. Approved. As of 2020 construction was planned to start in 2021 and the line open in 2025.

==== Taiwan ====
- 臺南捷運藍線, Tainan. Feasibility study currently being conducted.

==== Thailand ====
- MRT Brown Line, Bangkok. MRTA is reviewing the investment and fare models to align with current policies, with a presentation to the board expected by August 2025.
- MRT Grey Line, Bangkok. Feasibility study currently being conducted.

==== Turkey ====
- An unnamed monorail is proposed by the Ankara Metropolitan Municipality to be built in Ankara.

==== Vietnam ====
- Ho Chi Minh City Metro. Two lines are included in the 2007 and 2013 master plans for the city, with route lengths of 27.2 km (16.9 mi) and 16.2 km (10.1 mi), respectively.
- Da Lat Monorail, currently under planning

=== Europe ===
==== United Kingdom ====
- Liverpool, Merseyside. Originally included as part of the 2007 proposal for Liverpool Waters, it is planned to link to John Lennon Airport. As of 2018 the concept was still being considered but was not connected to the larger project.
- Runcorn, Cheshire. Proposed in 2020 as part of the planned "Heath Park" industrial estate.
- Havering, London. The borough is still considering a monorail to improve north–south transport links as of 2023.

==== Denmark ====
- MCH Skybus, Herning. Proposed in 2010 as part of MCH's 2025 vision, a monorail system would run between the exhibition centre and the town centre.

==== Ukraine ====
- Kyiv to Irpin monorail. Proposed in 2021

==== The Netherlands ====
- Tilburg to Kaatsheuvel monorail. Proposed in 2017

=== Oceania ===
- Brisbane Airport, Australia. Proposed in 2014. As of May 2021 it is still planned as part of a major redevelopment of the airport.
- Nelson City, New Zealand. Proposed in 2018.

== Decommissioned ==
=== Africa ===
==== Nigeria ====
- Calabar Monorail, Nigeria. A 3-station, 1.1 km (0.68 mi) Intamin monorail, opened in 2016 but shut down and abandoned almost immediately.

=== Americas ===
==== Brazil ====
- Rio de Janeiro had a private monorail that linked Barra Shopping mall to its parking lot. Only one part of the track and the platform still remain, in the parking lot (second floor, behind the Fnac dome).
- The Poços de Caldas Monorail was the very first monorail system in Brazil. It operated for 9 years when it went privatized and closed by its buyer. Today the system remains dead.

==== Canada ====
- Expo 86 in Vancouver, British Columbia had a monorail that was moved to Alton Towers in the United Kingdom.
- The Minirail at Expo 67 in Montreal (1967–2021), which joined Pleasure Beach Blackpool in purchasing rail and rolling stock from the monorail system at the 1964 Lausanne exposition, along with new rail cars from the manufacturer.
- The Ontario Southern Railway operated one of the earliest North American monorails between Crystal Beach Park in Crystal Beach, Ontario and the main line railway station (1896–1898).
- Toronto Zoo Domain Ride, Toronto (1976–1994) Though technologically closer to a simple rubber-tired metro, it was almost universally referred to as a monorail.

==== United States ====
United States decommissioned monorail systems
System	Location	Manufacturer	Open	Closed	Notes	Ref(s)
Boynton Bicycle Railroad	Long Island, New York	Unknown	1889	1890	Ran on a single load-bearing rail at ground level with a wooden overhead stabilising rail engaged by a pair of horizontally opposed wheels.	
Tampa International Airport monorail	Tampa, Florida		1991	2020		
Veldt Monorail	Busch Gardens Tampa Bay			1999		
Eagle One	Busch Gardens Williamsburg			1990s	Connected the theme park with the nearby Anheuser-Busch brewery. Park visitors could tour the brewery and return via monorail.	
	Busch Gardens California				Connected the theme park with the nearby Anheuser-Busch brewery.	
Carowinds Monorail	Carowinds	Universal Mobility, Inc.	1973	1994		
Centennial Monorail	Philadelphia, Pennsylvania		1876	1876	Demonstrated at the Centennial International Exhibition of 1876.	
Dallas Zoo Adventure Safari monorail	Dallas Zoo		1990s	2020	Operated from the 1990s with three 13-car units from Von Roll. It was mothballed in March 2014. It was refurbished and restarted operations in 2016. It closed in 2020, though the cars were still stored on site as of November 2023.	
Epsom Salts Monorail		Thomas Wright			Was "the fastest moving monorail in the world" when it was built from 1922 to 1924 by Thomas Wright, a florist from Los Angeles, who had discovered magnesium salts southwest of Death Valley.	
Monorail	HemisFair '68	Universal Design Limited			Had a monorail that carried visitors around the pavilions during the six-month event. Over 1 million riders used the monorail. A collision between two trains on September 15, 1968, resulted in one death and 48 injuries.	
Cloud Cruiser Monorail	Hermitage Landing (now known as Nashville Shores)		1982	Late 1980s	A lakeside camping and water recreation park in Nashville, Tennessee operated the to transport guests between the camping and recreation facilities of the park beginning in 1982. The open air monorail cars were cloud shaped and ultimately ceased operation after a guest jumped from one of the cars and suffered a broken leg in the late 1980s.	
Bel-Aire Express	Geauga Lake	Universal Design Limited	1969	2006		
Jacksonville Skyway	Jacksonville, Florida	Bombardier Transportation	1997	2026		
Jetrail	Dallas Love Field	Stanray Corporation	1969	1974	A suspended monorail, was the world's first fully automated monorail system.	
Trailblazer	Fair Park		1956	1964	Suspended monorail - the single monorail car was used in Houston for a demonstration prior to its relocation to the State Fair of Texas.	
Lion Country Safari Monorail	Kings Dominion	Universal Mobility, Inc.	1975	1993	The conveyance for visitors to its Lion Country Safari attraction.	
Oklahoma State Fair Monorail	Oklahoma State Fair	Universal Design Limited	1964	2005		
Pelham Park and City Island Railway	The Bronx, New York		1910	1910	A short-lived monorail system in 1910. It ceased operation after an accident.	
Philadelphia Zoo Safari Monorail	Philadelphia Zoo	Universal Design Limited	1969	1980s		
Miami Seaquarium Spacerail	Miami Seaquarium		1963	1991		
Wgasa Bush Line	San Diego Wild Animal Park			2007		
Monorail	1964 New York World's Fair		1964	1964	Flushing Meadows–Corona Park in Queens, New York had a monorail during the 1964 World's Fair. It was a proof of concept with only one station. It was sponsored by American Machine and Foundry.	
Metro	Six Flags Magic Mountain	Universal Mobility, Inc.	1971	2001	Train cars sold to Hersheypark.	
Monorail	Fairplex	American Crane and Hoist Company			The middle 90s saw a new station and new cars built by Arrow Dynamics. The new cars were far heavier than the original and caused it to last only a couple of years more until it was dismantled.	
Luxor-Excalibur Monorail	Las Vegas, Nevada	Arrow Dynamics	1994	1995	A short-lived monorail ran from the Luxor Casino to the Excalibur Hotel and Casino in Las Vegas. After opening in 1994 it was closed and dismantled in 1995 after a number of major issues. It was replaced by a cable hauled tram.	
Christmastime Monorail	Rich's		1956		Rich's, a department store in downtown Atlanta, Georgia, operated a child-scaled indoor monorail seasonally at Christmastime beginning in 1956. In 1965 the monorail was moved to the store's roof with the front car remodeled to look like a pig's head and was joined by a second pig-themed monorail with the two rooftop monorails becoming known as the Pink Pig Flyers. These two seasonal pig-themed children's monorails, known as Pricilla and Percival, operated until the downtown store closed in 1991.	
Monorail	Santa's Village	American Crane and Hoist Company				
Hotchkiss Bicycle Railroad	Smithville to Mount Holly, New Jersey		1892	1897		
Skytrail	Minnesota Zoo	Universal Mobility, Inc.	1979	2013		
Monorail	Midtown Plaza (Rochester, New York)			2007	Indoor novelty monorail	
The Monorail	Riverside Park (now Six Flags New England)	Universal Design Limited	1959	1996		
Zoofari	Zoo Miami	Universal Mobility, Inc.	1984	2022	Operated a four-station, 5 km (3.1 mi) monorail.	

=== Asia ===
==== China ====
- Happy Line, Shenzhen (1999–2018)

==== Hong Kong ====
- Monorail in Lai Chi Kok Amusement Park, Hong Kong
- Monorail in Kai Tak Amusement Park, Hong Kong

==== India ====
- Kundala Valley Railway, Munnar, Kerala (1902–1908)
- Patiala State Monorail Trainways, Punjab (1910–1927)
- Skybus Metro, Margao, Goa (2004–2013)

==== Indonesia ====
- Monas Amusement Park in Jakarta had a monorail system. However, due to the closure in 1992, the monorail system was dismantled.

==== Japan ====
- "Suspended Train" at the Exhibition of Transportation and Electricity in Osaka, 1928. Operated only for a week, from November 28 until December 3. It was the first monorail in the nation, as well as the only one in the pre-war period.
- Himeji City Monorail Line, Himeji (1966–1974)
- Odakyu Mukogaokayuen Monorail Line, Kawasaki, Kanagawa (1966–2001)
- Monkey Park Monorail Line, Inuyama, Aichi (1962–2008)
- Nara Dreamland Monorail, Nara Dreamland, Nara (1961–2006)
- Skyrail Midorizaka Line, Hiroshima (1998–2024)
- Yokohama Dreamland Monorail, Kamakura (1966–1967)
- Higashiyama Park Monorail, Higashiyama Zoo and Botanical Gardens, Nagoya (1964–1974); replaced by Sky View Train
- Ueno Zoo Monorail, Tokyo (1958–2019)
- Monorail, Kumamoto City Zoological and Botanical Gardens, Kumamoto (closed 2025)
- Super Train, Oyama Amusement Park, Oyama, Tochigi (closed 2005)

==== Turkey ====
- The Atlantis City Monorail in Ankara was a 0.52 km (0.32 mi) long monorail system that operated between Atlantis Shopping Mall and Batıkent Metro Station. It was built in 2012 but it is currently dismantled.

==== Malaysia ====
- Melaka Monorail, Malacca City, Malacca (2010–2020)
- Sunway Monorail, Petaling Jaya, Selangor. Served Sunway City, including Sunway Pyramid mall and Sunway Lagoon theme park and the surrounding. Decommissioned and partly dismantled to allow mall expansion. It was replaced by BRT Sunway Line.

==== Philippines ====
- Starmall Alabang featured a suspended monorail called the Sky Rail, which was located on the top floor Starland amusement park. Most of the route circle inside the enclosed portion of the mall, with an outdoor turnback above the pool area. The ride was operational as of 2009, but was eventually closed.

==== Singapore ====
- Sentosa Monorail, Singapore (1982–2005). Replaced by the Sentosa Express monorail.
- Jurong BirdPark Panorail (1991–2012)

==== Thailand ====
- Fashion Island Monorail, Bangkok, Thailand. Short indoor amusement park monorail in Fashion Island shopping center. Decommissioned due to an accident that killed 2 riders.
- Tuk-Tuk Monorail, Bangkok. Half indoor-outdoor monorail tour operated between LeoLand amusement park and the water park. The track survives in the 6th floor of Central City Bang Na.
- Chiang Mai Zoo monorail. The 2 kilometres (1.2 mi) opened in 2005 and ceased operations in 2014.

=== Europe ===
==== United Kingdom ====
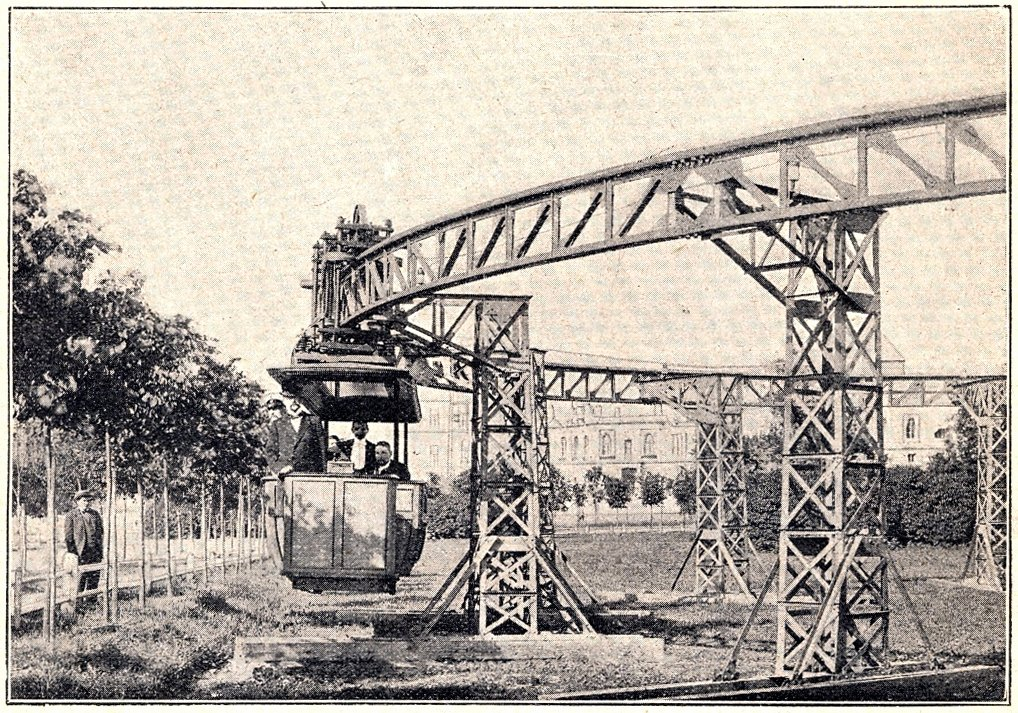
Monorail built in Gatchina, Russia (1900)

- Blackpool Pleasure Beach (relocated from 1964 Lausanne fair in Switzerland, closed in 2012)
- Milngavie, near Glasgow, had an experimental high-speed propeller-powered monorail, the Bennie Railplane, built during 1929–30 and abandoned during the Great Depression.
- Butlins Skegness Camp, Skegness, United Kingdom (1964–2002) – the first commercial monorail in the UK. Closed at the end of the 2002 season after the track was deemed to be structurally unsafe due to deterioration in the support foundations on the ground. It was then dismantled and removed in March 2003.
- Butlins Minehead Camp, Minehead, United Kingdom (1967–1996) – closed in the summer of 1996 following an accident when one train ran into the back of another due to the track signals being disconnected and ran by an inexperienced monorail controller, who was at the time, 20 years old and on the first day of his job. The crash caused minor injuries to seven people, and in March 1997, Butlins were fined £22,500 for poor safety standards. After the accident, because the monorail system was deemed too expensive to upgrade, the monorail remained standing but not operating until the winter of 1998, when it was finally torn down to make way for the Skyline Pavilion.
- Birmingham Airport had a magnetic levitation (Mag-Lev) train which had to be closed down because it became life-expired and lacked spare parts. It was the world's first Mag-Lev in public operation but was replaced by the cable-propelled Air-Rail Link in the 2000s.
- Lartigue Monorail in Ireland (and France). A restored 1-kilometre (0.62 mi) section now operates in Listowel.
- Safari Skyway, Chessington, United Kingdom (1986–2015). Operated in Chessington World of Adventures.
- Merry Hill Shopping Centre, Brierley Hill, West Midlands had a Von Roll Mk III Series monorail which opened in June 1991 but only worked for a short while before being closed in 1996 and finally being sold off in the 2000s. The rolling stock then operated in Broadbeach, Queensland, Australia. Reasons for the closure of this system include a combination of technical problems and safety concerns (especially the difficulty of evacuation), exacerbated by a dispute between the owners of Merry Hill and The Waterfront which at this time were owned separately.
- Chester Zoo monorail 1.4 km (0.9 mi), operational 1991 to 2019.

==== Continental Europe ====
- Lartigue Monorail in département of Loire, France. A 17 km (11 mi) line was built between Feurs and Panissières. It was never put into service despite completion of the line in 1895 after it failed during testing in both 1895 and 1896. The track and equipment were scrapped in 1902.
- Russia had one suspended monorail built in 1899 at a leisure park in Gatchina. A horse-pulled monorail was already built in 1820 in Myachkove near Moscow.

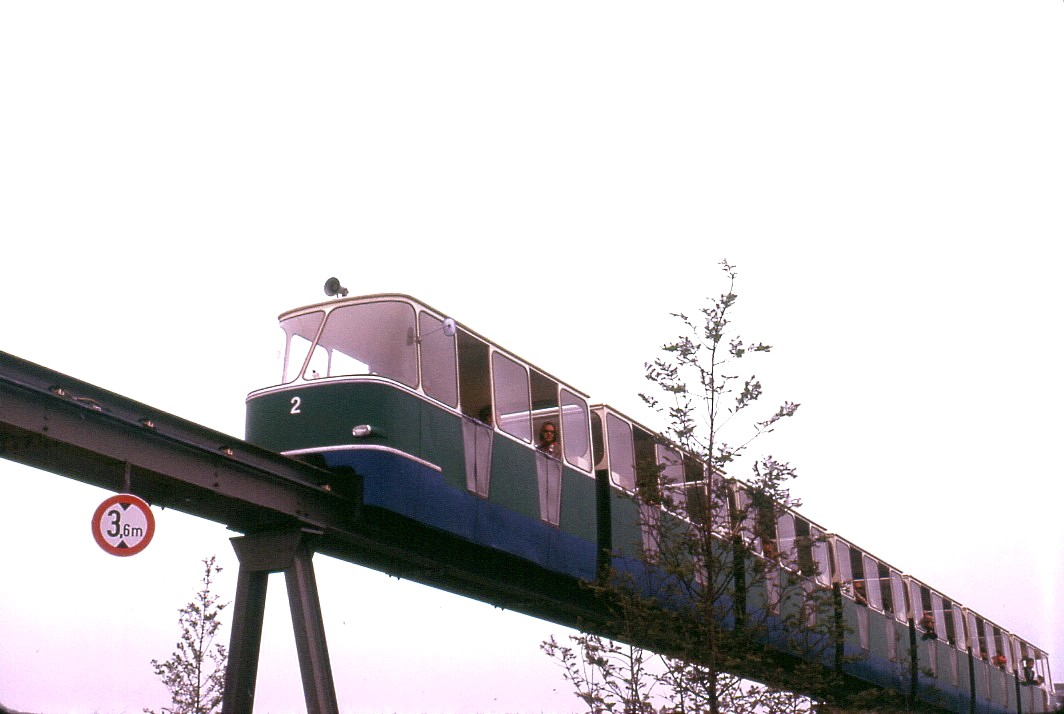
Vienna Einschienenbahn in 1974

- Moscow Monorail. 4.7 km, 6 stations. Built in early 2000's and opened to service in 2004. Throughout its lifespan the line and rolling stock was flooded with numerous and often constant breakdowns, because it was built with Intamin technology that wasn't intended for urban transport use. The line closed on 27 June 2025 to be converted to elevated urban park, after public referendum with 71.14% in favor of conversion.
- France has two abandoned test tracks for the Aérotrain, which can be considered monorails. One is between Limours and Gometz-la-Ville and the other between Saran and Artenay. France also had a suspended monorail the SAFEGE that featured in the film Fahrenheit 451.
- Phantasialand: Phantasialand Jet (1974–2008), closed and removed. Manufacturer was the German theme park ride manufacturer Schwarzkopf.
- Seville Expo '92 in Spain: Relocated at 2009 at Plaza Imperial Shopping Center in Zaragoza. Now discontinued.
- Emsland test facility, Germany: test track for the Transrapid Maglev.
- Turin, Italy, had a 2 stop monorail built for Expo 61; it used the same Alweg trains as in the Seattle Monorail.
- Vienna, Austria, had a short monorail line, built by Schwarzkopf GmbH for the Vienna International Garden Show in 1974

=== Oceania ===
- Sydney Monorail (also known as Metro Monorail), Sydney, Australia (closed on 30 June 2013)
- Brisbane, Queensland had a Von Roll Type II monorail built for World Expo '88. Four sets, consisting of nine carriages each, operated in a continuous loop throughout the Expo site. A single train set and some track was sold to Sea World, Gold Coast, in 1989 for expansion of its monorail system. The remainder of the sets and track were bought back by Von Roll.
- Broadbeach Monorail (1989–2017)
- Sea World Monorail System (1986–2022)

== Cancelled or lapsed proposals ==
=== Africa ===
- Aba, Nigeria. A 2012 proposed. The plan was criticised as potentially a scam since the private company had no experience in developing monorails. The same private firm was to develop the Onitsha monorail (see below). As of 2021 there is no information that the proposal progressed passed the signing of a memorandum of understanding.
- Lagos, Nigeria. Proposed in 2008. The Red line on the Lagos Rail Mass Transit was built as a railway instead
- Onitsha, Nigeria. A 2011 proposal with the first stage of producing a feasibility study. As of 2021 no further developments appear to have occurred.
- Rivers Monorail in Port Harcourt, Nigeria. Construction abandoned

=== Americas ===
==== South America ====
- Arequipa, Peru. 2013 proposal. Rejected in 2016.
- Buenos Aires, Argentina. Proposals in 1998 and 2012. Neither has materialized.
- São Paulo, Brazil had a project (Line 18) to build a monorail that would connect São Paulo to the neighbour ABC region. It was cancelled and replaced by a BRT system.
- Niterói, Brazil. The proposed monorail had received the go-ahead from Dilma Rousseff to connect Niterói, São Gonçalo, and Itaboraí, before the State considered implementing a heavy metro solution instead.

==== Canada ====
- Wasaga Beach, Ontario, Canada. A 2007 proposal for a 3 kilometres (1.9 mi) monorail to connect the beach front to a carpark. Plans were abandoned after a fire at the end of 2007.

==== United States ====
- In 2005, as part of the DestiNY USA project in Syracuse, a monorail was proposed from Syracuse University to Syracuse Hancock International Airport via downtown and the DestiNY complexes is planned.
- Lubbock, Texas monorail was proposed in 2014, to connect Texas Tech with the downtown area. As of 2020 there is no other mention of the plan except the original suggestion.
- Chicago, Navy Pier – a 2006 proposal to run a monorail down the length of the pier. As of 2021 the plans seem to have lapsed.
- Nashville to Murfreesboro, Tennessee monorail – a 2014 plan to build a monorail on the I-24 corridor between the cities. The Tennessee Department of Transportation completed an assessment report in 2015 but the project has not proceeded.

==== Central America and the Caribbean ====
- Sherbourne Conference Centre Monorail, Saint Michael, Barbados was proposed in 2008

=== Asia ===
==== Bangladesh ====
- Dhaka Monorail, Dhaka, Bangladesh was a 2002 planned 51-kilometre (32-mile) system. The Dhaka Metro Rail (partially operational) and the Dhaka Subway are both planned to use railway technology.

==== Hong Kong ====
- Environmentally Friendly Linkage System, New Kowloon, Hong Kong

==== India ====
- Shimla, Himachal Pradesh. 2018 proposal. The project was ruled out in 2021.

==== Iran ====
- Tehran Monorail, Tehran. Project cancelled in 2010 after completion of 3% of construction work.

==== Indonesia ====
- Jakarta Monorail, Jakarta. Construction started in 2000s but project cancelled on 2015 by the Governor of Jakarta Basuki Tjahaja Purnama, however this project has been replaced by Jabodebek LRT.

==== Malaysia ====
- Putrajaya Monorail, Construction halted since 2004. As of 2023, there are no plans to revive the project.

==== Sri Lanka ====
- Colombo Monorail, Colombo, Sri Lanka proposed in 2015. A light rail system was chosen as the preferred option but was not constructed either.

==== Turkey ====
- Istanbul Monorail, plans cancelled in 2017.

=== Europe ===
==== Grecce ====
- Thessaloniki Monorail, Greece, was a proposed monorail line that will start at Mikra Station and end at Makedonia International Airport. An extension of the metro to the airport is now being planned.

==== Poland ====
- Katowice and Sosnowiec to Pyrzowice Airport. In August 2020 it was reported an 18-month study had commenced. The project was opposed as being too expensive.
- Rzeszów. 2010s proposal for system of 7 km (4.3 mi). In June 2022 project was abandoned due to the project not being suited to the city's needs.

==== Spain ====
- Las Palmas de Gran Canaria, 'Tren Vertebrado'; Construction commenced but the project was abandoned. Disassembled 1975

==== Ukraine ====
- Kyiv Monorail, Ukraine, was a proposed monorail system. The 1.8 km line connecting Hidropark and Paton bridge was proposed in 1966, followed by the 3.5 km line connecting Hidropark and Berezniaky neighborhood proposed in 1970 (either as the separate line or an extension of the previous line). Both lines were never built and the project was abandoned in 1970s.

==== United Kingdom ====
- Manchester Monorail, a 16-mile (26 km) SAFEGE-type monorail proposed in 1966 for Manchester, UK, to run across the city to Manchester Airport
- Preston Monorail, United Kingdom
- Scotland. A maglev monorail system was proposed in 2009 to link Glasgow and Edinburgh, with a journey time of 18 minutes. The plan was judged to be technologically feasible, but was not progressed because of the cost.
- Southampton Rapid Transit System, a "People Mover" proposed c.1989, to run over a three mile long "horseshoe" route around the City Centre, but later abandoned.

== See also ==
- List of maglev train proposals
- List of airport people mover systems
- List of funicular railways
- List of suburban and commuter rail systems
- List of tram and light rail transit systems
- List of town tramway systems
- List of trolleybus systems
- List of bus rapid transit systems
- List of premetro systems
