= Skyrail =

Skyrail may refer to the following:

== Transport ==
- Air-Rail Link people mover at Birmingham Airport, England, formerly known as SkyRail
- BYD SkyRail, a commercial monorail system
- Skyrail Midorizaka Line in Hiroshima, Japan
- Skyrail Rainforest Cableway in Queensland, Australia
- Elevated sections of railway lines in Melbourne, Australia built as part of the Victoria State Government's Level Crossing Removal Project

== Other ==
- A level in the computer game James Bond 007: Nightfire
