= Rivers State Monorail =

Coordinates: 4°46′17.4″N 7°00′32.4″E

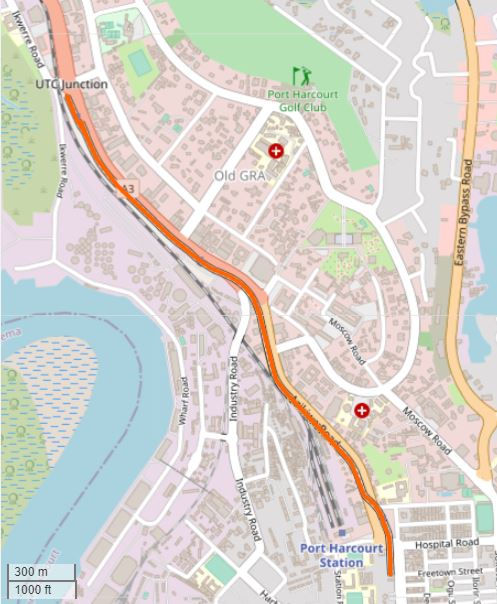
- Rivers Monorail route map from OpenStreetMap

Overview
- Status: construction abandoned
- Locale: Port Harcourt
- Termini: Shark Park; UTC Junction
- Stations: 6 (3 in Phase 1a, 3 in Phase 1b)

Service
- Type: Monorail
- Services: 1
- Rolling stock: Intamin People Mover P30

History
- Opened: never opened

Technical
- Line length: 5.4 km (3.4 mi) (planned)
- Number of tracks: 1
- Operating speed: 70 km/h (43 mph)

The Rivers State Monorail, also known as Rivers Monorail and occasionally as Port Harcourt Monorail, is a partially built monorail urban transportation project in Port Harcourt, Rivers State, Nigeria. Three stations and connecting guideway of Phase 1a were constructed and one vehicle was delivered but the line never went into operation and development stopped in 2016.

The project was announced in 2011 and construction commenced in 2012. As of September 2017 construction has only been partially completed despite $400 million having been spent and the project is at a standstill. Some reports says the project will never be completed. As of 2021 news reports indicate the project has been abandoned.

== Details ==
The planned construction included two phases

- Phase 1A from Sharks Park Station to UTC Station with an intermediate stop at Azikiwe Station
- Phase 1B to extend the route north with three stops at Isaac Boro Station, Garrison Station and Waterlines Station.

The overall distance from Sharks Park to Waterlines was to be 5.4 km (3.4 mi). Further extensions were considered.

The system was to use Intamin People Mover P30 monorail trains and one vehicle was delivered. One train was to be in operation in Phase 1A, and six trains in Phase 1B. A train consisted of seven individual cars with six passenger cars and a seventh car for the motors and electrical equipment with a driver’s cab at each end. Each train would be able to accommodate 172 passengers, with provision for 44 seated passengers included. One end car will have access for wheelchairs, and all cabin floors will be the same height as the station platforms to provide easy access for passengers with reduced mobility. Provision will be made for hand-held luggage only.

The design operating capacity for Phase 1A is 1,200 passengers per hour with the single vehicle providing a shuttle service along the route. With a maximum operating speed of 70 km/h (43 mph), estimated train travel between end stations was 8 minutes of Phase 1a. Six train operation had a design operating capacity of 2,700 passengers per hour. Train travel time between end stations of Phase 1b was 22 minutes with a service frequency of 8 minutes. There is no indication that revenue service ever commenced.

== History ==
The decision to build the monorail was taken in 2009. In 2010, building of the project foundations began. The Government of Rivers State had in February 2013 announced that phase 1A and 1B of the monorail system would be completed during September that year. By 2014, monorail trains were performing test runs through UTC Station.

In 2015, the LP gubernatorial candidate Tonye Princewill said he would cancel the system. However, he lost the election, receiving 0.86% of the vote.

In June 2015, newly elected Rivers State Governor Ezenwo Nyesom Wike announce that the project would be reviewed.

In July 2015 Intamin published a video shows a vehicle running on the line.

In March 2016 it was reported the government had abandoned the project.

In August 2016 it was reported the incomplete project had so far cost $400 million and this compared unfavorably with the 4.7 kilometres (2.9 mi) Moscow Monorail that also used Intamin's design but had only cost $240 million and was fully operational.

In September 2017 it was reported the project is at a standstill. Another report says the project will never be completed.

As of July 2021 the guideway and stations are still in place but are described as an "eyesore".

== See also ==
- List of monorail systems
- Cross River Monorail, also in Nigeria, opened in April 2016
