= Jakarta Monorail =

Cancelled monorail network project in Jakarta, Indonesia

Jakarta Eco Transport Monorail

Overview
- Owner: Province of DKI Jakarta
- Locale: Jakarta, Indonesia
- Transit type: Monorail
- Number of lines: 2 (projected)
- Number of stations: 27 (projected)
- Headquarters: South Jakarta, DKI Jakarta

Operation
- Operator: PT. Jakarta Monorail
- Number of vehicles: 10 & 18 per train
Project plan (2013)

The Jakarta Monorail (abbr. JET Monorail) is a cancelled monorail network project in Jakarta, Indonesia. If completed, it would have comprised two lines, totalling up to 29 km (18 mi).

The project had a tumultuous history. First awarded in 2003, the contract changed owners three times by 2005, before being abandoned with little more than some pillars built in 2008. The project was revived in February 2013, but cancelled again in 2015 due to financial problems and legal disputes. Jakarta Governor Basuki "Ahok" Tjahaja Purnama confirmed in September 2015 that the project would not continue. The abandoned pillars began for demolition in 2026.

== History ==
=== Planning and early construction ===
The project was initially awarded in 2003 to Malaysian company MTrans, the technology owner and builders of the KL Monorail. Construction started in June 2004 but was halted after only a few weeks after the funds for the project stopped. MTrans' memorandum of understanding (MoU) was then cancelled after MTrans didn't respond adequately, and the MoU did not move towards a formal agreement.

The project was subsequently awarded to the Singaporean-led Omnico consortium, which proposed to use the Hitachi Monorail system (the base used for the KL Monorail) and then later on switched to the maglev technology by South Korean company Rotem.

In July 2005, the project changed hands again with a new MoU granted to a consortium of PT Bukaka Teknik Utama, PT INKA and Siemens Indonesia (former vice president Jusuf Kalla, who then assumed office, owns a large stake in Bukaka). Omnico contested this move, but construction continued nonetheless, under the assumption that the basic foundation piles and pillars can be used by whichever consortium and technology wins in the end. By 2006, a change in shareholder structure resulted to PT Indonesia Transit Central (ITC) controlling 98 percent of the shares in the company, leaving partner Omnico with only 2 percent, reduced from its initial 45 percent. Reports indicate fares of Rp 5,000 per trip were considered with government subsidies and that the Dubai Islamic Bank was sought as an investor of up to US$500 million but had pulled out when the government refused to provide guarantees if ridership were to fall below 160,000 per day.

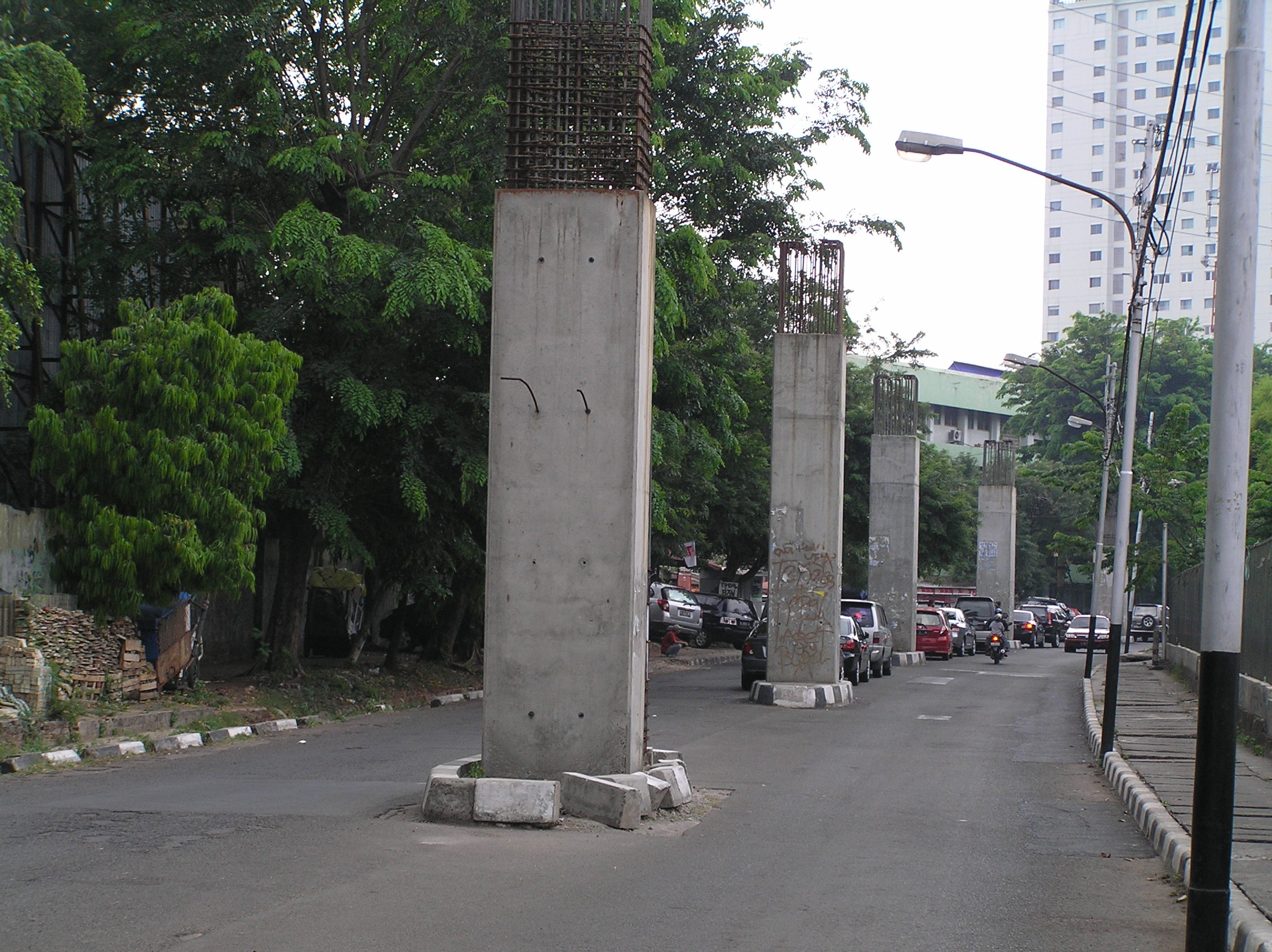
Support pillars for the stalled monorail project in October 2008

In March 2008, developers PT Jakarta Monorail officially abandoned the project. Then, in April, numerous pylons to support the future track were illegally demolished, probably by metal thieves.

In September 2011, the Jakarta administration called off the monorail project with a maximum Rp.204 billion ($23.3 million) compensation to PT Jakarta Monorail.

=== Construction resumes ===
In February 2013, the revival of the monorail project was announced by Dedy S. Priatna, deputy of infrastructure at the National Development Planning Agency (Bappenas), as part of plans to improve public transport in Jakarta.

Private corporation PT Jakarta Monorail undertook the project's development. The consortium was 90% owned by Singapore-based Ortus Group and 10% by PT Indonesia Transit Central (ITC). Ortus Group has reportedly paid Rp 2.3 trillion (US$238 million) for its share in the consortium. A deal has been signed to buy the pylons built between 2004 and 2007 from PT Adhi Karya for Rp 190 billion (US$19.5 million). The consortium plans to finance the Rp 8 trillion project with 70% debt and the balance by equity.

In April 2013, Chinese firm Changchun Railway Vehicles Co., Ltd. (CNR) was declared the preferred manufacturer of the trains for the railway. A prototype vehicle was displayed at Monas (National Monument) in central Jakarta from 22 June to 14 July 2013. In early May 2013 marketing firm XM JWT Jakarta was appointed to handle all branding, advertising, events, PR and digital marketing. The consortium ran a public competition on its website to choose the name the new system: "JET", an acronym for "Jakarta Eco Transit".

On 29 June 2013, Jakarta Governor Joko "Jokowi" Widodo signed an agreement with PT Jakarta Monorail to allow the project to proceed. Fares are proposed at Rp 10,000 (US $1.01) per trip with an initial capacity of 274,000 passengers per day with a design capacity of 35,000 passengers per hour per direction. In announcing the deal the Governor called for work to commence as soon as possible and said the line should open by 2016; he also said that he hoped the other consortium proposing a regional monorail in greater Jakarta would make progress (see section below). Details of the agreement do not seem to have been made public.

Groundbreaking took place on 16 October 2013.

=== Contract termination ===
In 2014, the project was stalled after a disagreement between PT Jakarta Monorel as the contractor and developer with Jakarta Municipal Government, over the design of the stations as well as the land acquisition for the monorail depot. The proposed elevated grand monorail station in Dukuh Atas, Stadion Madya Senayan and Kuningan Sentral for example, has raised critical questions since the supporting pylons of this grand stations will occupy public spaces; street, canal, pedestrian and public parks.

The design of grand monorail stations and operator insistence on the right to lease the spaces in stations, also has sparked arguments over the suspicions that the operator actually intended to build new malls, shopping centres and office space over Jakarta's streets disguised as monorail station construction. The Dukuh Atas monorail station for example was proposed to become a 10 storey building, while Kuningan Sentral would rise to a structure between 4-5 stories tall which would occupy Rasuna Said Boulevard. The Jakarta municipal government refused PT Jakarta Monorel's proposal to build a monorail depot over Setiabudi reservoir near Dukuh Atas and West Jakarta Flood Canal near Tanah Abang, arguing that the construction would harm the canal and dam structure. Dinas Tata Ruang DKI (Jakarta Spatial Planning Agency) rejected the use of proposed land for the construction of a monorail depot and station, arguing that the land proposed must be sterile from commercial buildings.

In January 2015, the Jakarta administration decided to cancel its contract with monorail project operator PT Jakarta Monorail (JM) to develop the monorail routes proposed by the firm. Reasons cited were that the route JM proposed to build was not feasible and doubts over the company's ability to fund the project.

== The project ==
=== Intracity monorail ===
The original monorail was planned to be two main lines. The loop line known as the Green line would have served the business districts of the city (Casablanca and Rasuna Said Area), 14.8 km (9.2 mi) with 15 stops. The second line known as the Blue line would have been 14.2 km (8.8 mi) with 12 stops and would have run from Kampung Melayu to Tanah Abang. The whole system would have had the total of 29 km. It would have had two interchange stations at Casablanca and Karet to allow passengers to switch between these two lines, and the Sudirman Dukuh Atas station would also have allowed passengers to switch to the Jakarta Busway and the Jakarta railway network.

The system was due to have an initial capacity of 10,000 passengers per hour per direction (pphpd) expandable to 30,000 pphpd. In the opening year, the Jakarta Monorail was planned to carry on average 274,000 people per day with plans to scale up capacity size quickly as the design capacity is set to carry 35,000 passengers per hour per direction.

=== Connection to intercity project ===
A consortium of five state owned enterprises (SOEs), led by PT Adhi Karya (previously part of the Jakarta Monorail consortium), has said they have plans to build a 39.036 km (24 mi) monorail line connecting Cibubur-Cawang-Kuningan and Bekasi-Cawang across Greater Jakarta. The line will connect to the 'Green' and 'Blue' lines to be built by PT Jakarta Monorail In early May 2013 the SOE consortium unveiled a mockup of their own prototype monorail car, built by PT INKA in Jakarta. The consortium said they are waiting for a permit from the central government as their routes would cover three government regions. It is expected to cost between Rp 7 trillion (US$800 million) and Rp 9 trillion (US$923 million) with financing to come from the SOEs and loans from state owned banks. Ridership is estimated at 191,600 per day.

This plan eventually evolved into the Jabodebek LRT, which is not based on monorail technology, but will reuse some of the monorail pillars.

== Criticism ==
A number of commentators and analysts have criticised the monorail on grounds of costs (compared to busway) or lack of capacity (compared to a subway or heavy rail) as well as unrealistic predictions.

In 2005, the non-governmental organization Pelangi said "based on (these) sustainability requirements, the busway outweighs the subway or monorail"; they recommended that Jakarta should focus on extending and improving the TransJakarta bus rapid transit (BRT) network rather than build subways or monorails as the busway would have lower capital costs and did not require operational subsidies. Also given the lower costs the busway could be extended to serve a great proportion of the population for the same amount of money. (Transjakarta has already the worlds longest BRT network at 172 km with 200 stations and operates with 520 buses carrying 350,000 people per day).

In 2008, the former Mayor of Bogotá, Colombia, Enrique Peñalosa also called for Jakarta to expand the busways instead of monorail or subways; he told a seminar that "[A] subway would cost three times its contract value, yet it would only cover several lines, (but) with the same amount of money you could reach all parts of the city with the (busway) network,". Bogota has one of the world's most extensive and busiest BRT networks, the TransMilenio.

The monorail line design; loop Green line and Blue line, has gained criticism, as it only connects shopping malls in Jakarta's city center, and would not connect to suburban Jakarta that desperately need transportation infrastructure; thus would not be useful for many Jakartan commuters. Transportation experts deemed that the city center monorail project would not answer Jakarta's traffic problems, but would only serves as a novelty tourists' ride.

In November 2012, the Director of the Institute of Transportation Studies, Darmaningtyas, said the capacity of the monorail was too limited, it was not economic and not suitable for Jakarta: "Everything has to be built, including the train depot. This is not economical. The fare can be over Rp 10,000 per person. If seen from the monorail’s planned coverage in Jakarta, with a radius of less than 10km, this is too expensive"

The project was further criticised in February 2013 by Bambang Susantono, the deputy minister of transportation, on the grounds that it was not sustainable in the long term and other public transport modes better suited Jakarta's requirements. The two line project agreed to in June 2013 is supposed to be built without any government financing. The Jakarta City Council has set up a committee to ensure the project does not draw on funds from the City's budget.

== Cancellation ==
Jakarta Governor Basuki Tjahaja Purnama stated on 10 September 2015 that negotiations with monorail project operator PT Jakarta Monorail (JM) would not continue, meaning total discontinuation of the infrastructure project. State-owned construction company PT Adhi Karya is to use the numerous monorail support poles to develop the Jabodebek LRT.

The shift of choice from monorail to LRT Jabodebek system was based on several considerations; compared to monorail, LRT has higher passenger capacity, simpler intersection and switching system, and cheaper maintenance cost. With common track gauge of 1,435 mm (4 ft 8 1/2 in), would make LRT easier to integrate with existing commuter railways and Jakarta MRT.

== See also ==
- List of monorail systems
