= JWT Jakarta =

Company of Indonesia

- Founded: 1989
- Headquarters: Indonesia

JWT Jakarta (formerly known as JWT AdForce) is the Indonesian office of the JWT global advertising and marketing company, which is part of the WPP Group.

== Overview ==
Founded in 1989, it was bought out and merged with the JWT advertising company in 1997. The company is currently headed by D.D. Lulut Asmoro as the President Director. JWT Jakarta is located in Menteng, Central Jakarta.

Some notable advertising campaign clients are: Indosat IM3, Indofood (for Chitato, and Pop Mie), Indomilk's CalciSkim, Jakarta Monorail, Ford, Nokia, HSBC and Johnson & Johnson.

== Awards ==
Most recently, JWT Jakarta earned a bronze at ADFEST 2013 for their guerilla marketing for "Osteocessories" - a campaign to raise awareness about osteoporosis.

Previously, they won bronze at ADFEST 2012 for their print advertisement titled "Caravan" for the motion sickness tablet Antimo. They also won that year for their advertisement for Nokia GPS with their campaign called "NOKIA GPS : MORNING/DAY/NIGHT".

Back in 2008, JWT Jakarta won the Spikes Green award for "Baby Tree", a campaign sponsored by the World Wildlife Foundation.

== Joint Venture with XM Gravity ==
Digital agency XM Gravity partnered up with JWT Jakarta to handle all branding, advertising, events, PR and digital marketing affairs related to the much-awaited Jakarta Monorail.

The XM JWT collaboration kicked off in June 2013 with a crowdsourcing initiative that will let Indonesians name the monorail.

The newly formed XM JWT has also won work for Gudang Garam. They will also provide digital marketing strategies to existing JWT Jakarta clients, including American Standard.
