= Xining Metro =

Planned metro system in Xining, China

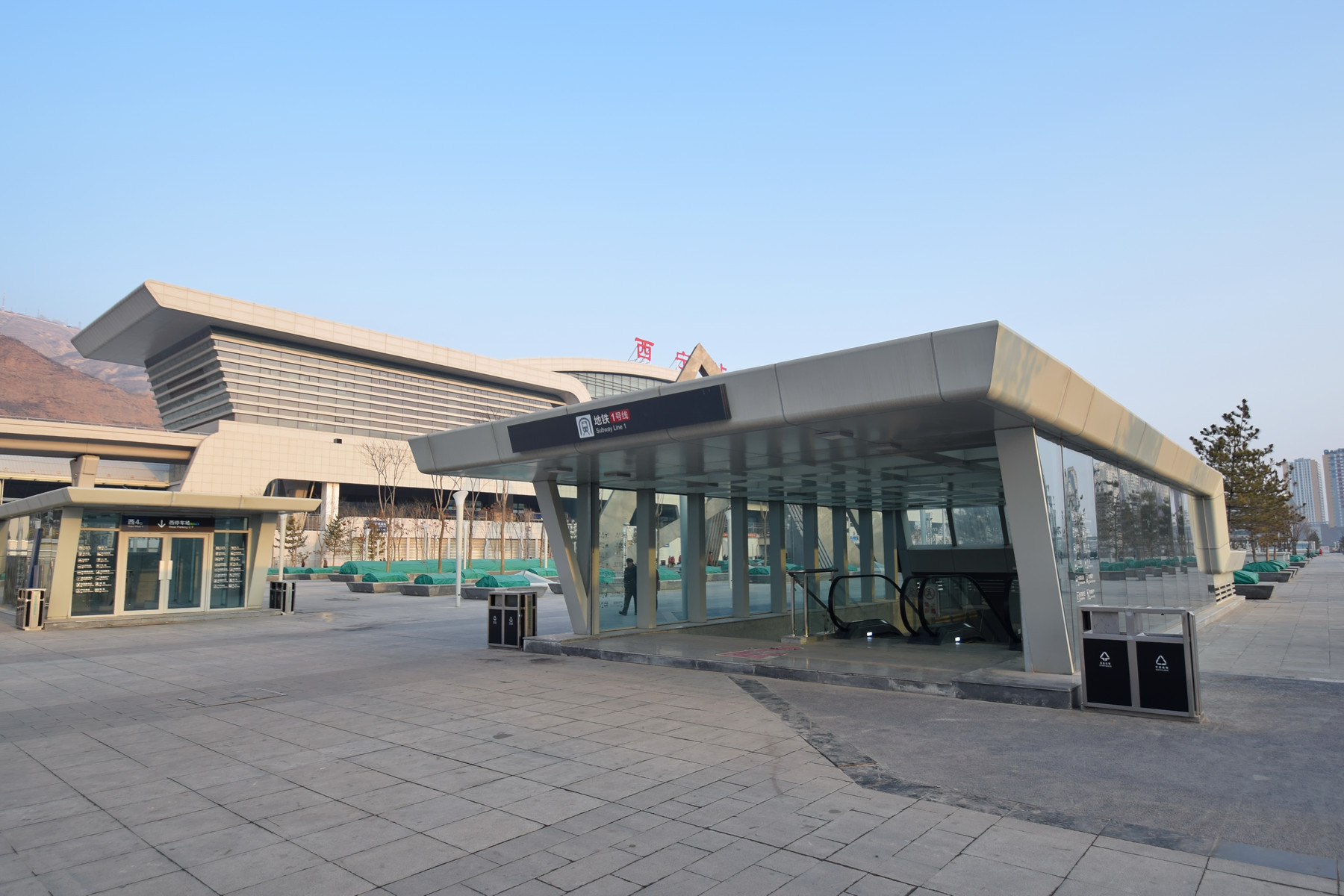
- Reserved metro exit at Xining railway station

Overview
- Locale: Xining, Qinghai, China
- Transit type: Rapid Transit
- Number of lines: 3 (planning)
- Number of stations: 61 (planning)

Technical
- System length: 92.5 km (57.5 mi) (planned)

Xining Metro
- Simplified Chinese: 西宁地铁
- Traditional Chinese: 西寧地鐵
Transcriptions
Standard Mandarin
- Hanyu Pinyin: Xīníng Dìtiě

Xining Metro is a rapid transit system under planning in Xining, Qinghai. The vision for the Xining Metro includes three metro lines totaling 92.5 kilometers (57 mi), and a four-line, 88-kilometer (55 mi) suburban rail network, in the completed regional rapid transit network. A total of seven lines are proposed.

Line 1 and the first stage of Line 3 will cost about 28 billion yuan.

As of November 18, 2026, the metro system has not been approved by NDRC, so actual construction has not started — except for a reserved section near Xining railway station.

== Line 1 ==
Line 1 will be 29.5 kilometers (18.3 mi) long and underground with 23 stations from Xicheng Boulevard to Jinkai Street via Xining railway station.

== Line 2 ==
Line 2 will be 21.2 kilometers (13.2 mi) long with 16 stations from Huayuantaicun to Bowen Street.

== Line 3 ==
Line 3 will be 18.2 kilometers (11.3 mi) long with 13 stations from Sanjiaohuayuan to Qingshui Street.

== See also ==
- Yinchuan Metro, proposed urban rapid transit network in Yinchuan, Ningxia
- Urban rail transit in China
