= List of maglev train proposals =

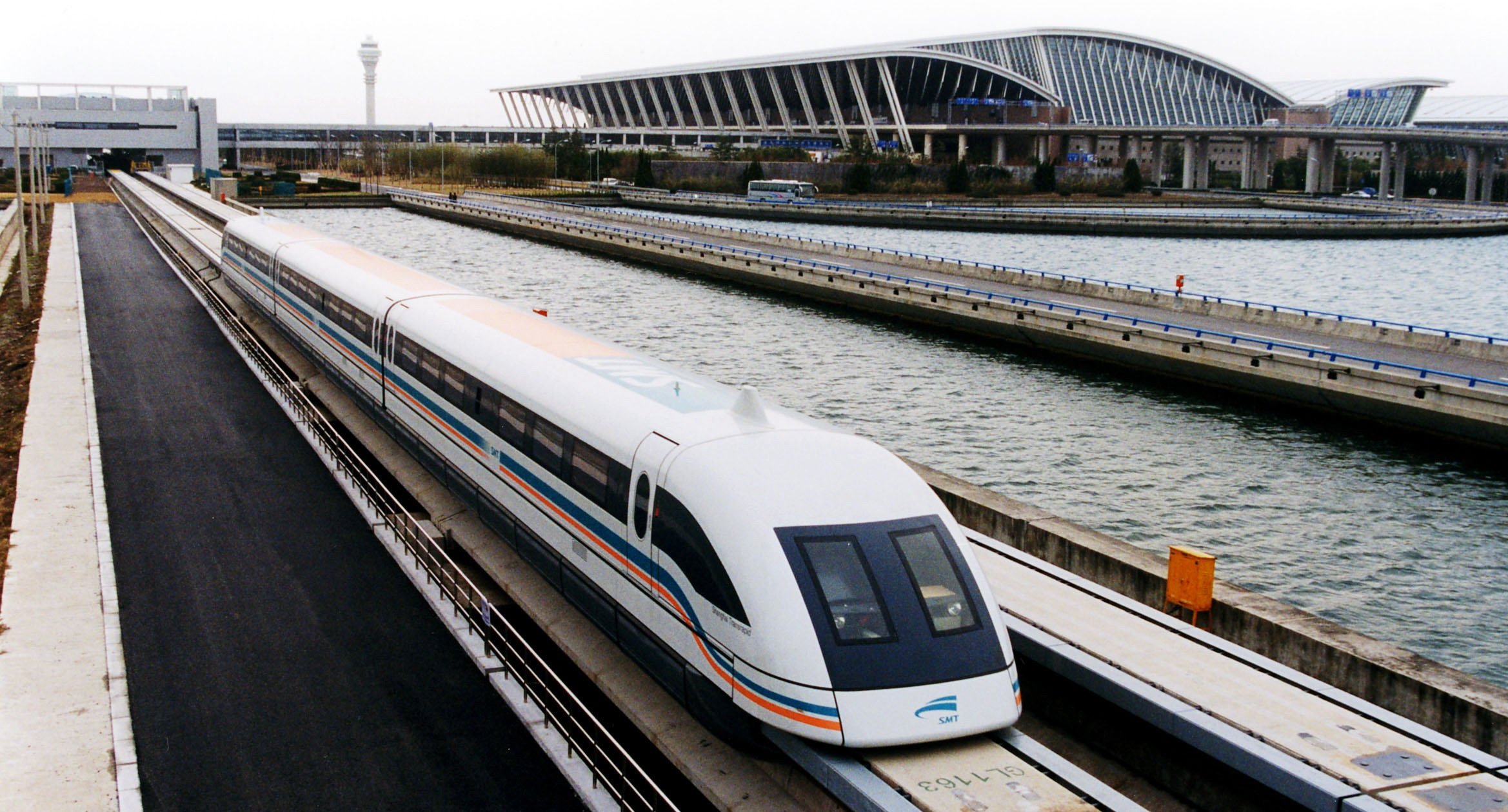
A maglev train coming out of the Pudong International Airport

This is a list of proposed maglev trains worldwide. Some proposals may have been rejected.

== Asia ==
=== China ===
==== Beijing – Guangzhou line ====
In 2019, there were plans to build a maglev test line linking Xianning in Hubei Province and Changsha in Hunan Province. Construction was scheduled to begin in 2020. The test line was planned to be about 200 kilometres (120 mi) in length and possibly become part of a Beijing to Guangzhou maglev line. In 2021, the Guangdong government proposed a Maglev line between Hong Kong and Guangzhou via Shenzhen and beyond to Beijing.

==== Shanghai – Hangzhou ====
There were plans to extend the Shanghai airport maglev line, which runs between Pudong airport and the city of Shanghai, initially by some 35 kilometers to Hong Qiao airport before the World Expo 2010 and then, in an additional phase, by 200 kilometers to the city of Hangzhou, which would have been the first inter-city maglev rail line in commercial service in the world.

Talks with Germany and Transrapid Konsortium about the details of the construction contracts took place. While the Chinese Minister of Transportation was quoted by several Chinese and Western newspapers in 2006 as saying the line was approved, a February 27, 2009 People's Daily Online article indicates that the Shanghai municipal government is considering building the line underground to allay the public's fear of electromagnetic pollution, and that any final decision has to be approved by the National Development and Reform Commission. There extended line was never built.

==== Guangzhou – Shenzhen – Hong Kong ====
The Express Rail Link, previously known as the Regional Express, is a high-speed rail line that connects Kowloon in Hong Kong to Guangzhou in China. During the planning stage, three alternative were considered: a maglev, a conventional high-speed rail line on a new alignment and a conventional high-speed rail line following the existing West Rail route. Ultimately, a conventional high-speed rail line was built on a new alignment, becoming operational on 23 September 2018.

=== Hong Kong ===
In March 2021 a government official said Hong Kong would be included in a planned maglev network across China, planned to operate at 600 km/h (370 mph) and begin opening by 2030.

=== India ===
==== Mumbai – Delhi ====
A maglev line project was presented to the then Indian railway minister (Mamata Banerjee) by an American company. A line was proposed to serve between the cities of Mumbai and Delhi, the Prime Minister Manmohan Singh said that if the line project is successful the Indian government would build lines between other cities and also between Mumbai Central and Chhatrapati Shivaji International Airport.

==== Mumbai – Nagpur ====
The State of Maharashtra has also approved a feasibility study for a maglev train between Mumbai (the commercial capital of India as well as the State government capital) and Nagpur (the second State capital) about 1,000 kilometres (620 mi) away. It plans to connect the regions of Mumbai and Pune with Nagpur via less developed hinterland (via Ahmednagar, Beed, Latur, Nanded and Yavatmal).

==== Chennai – Bangalore – Mysore ====
Per Large and Medium Scale Industries Minister of Karnataka Mr. Murugesh Nirani, a detailed report will be prepared and submitted by December 2012 and the project is expected to cost $26 million per kilometer of railway track. The speed of maglev will be 350 km/h and the Bangalore to Mysore portion would take as little as 30 minutes.

==== Kochi Metro ====
Union Minister of State for Consumer Affairs, Food and Public Distribution K. V. Thomas proposed that Kochi Metro can adopt same technology as present in South Korea.

==== Mumbai Maglev ====
A 2007 proposal, revived in 2020, for a 55-kilometre (34 mi) elevated line to connect Chhatrapati Shivaji Terminus (CSTM) and Panvel with a branch line to Navi Mumbai International Airport.

=== Iran ===
In May 2009, Iran and a German company signed an agreement to use maglev to link Tehran and Mashhad. The agreement was signed at the Mashhad International Fair site between Iranian Ministry of Roads and Transportation and the German company. The 900-kilometre (560 mi) line possibly could reduce travel time between Tehran and Mashhad to about 2.5 hours. Munich-based Schlegel Consulting Engineers said they had signed the contract with the Iranian ministry of transport and the governor of Mashad. "We have been mandated to lead a German consortium in this project," a spokesman said. "We are in a preparatory phase." The project could be worth between €10 billion and €12 billion, the Schlegel spokesman said.

=== Japan ===
==== Chūō Shinkansen ====
On May 27, 2011, the Transport Minister of Japan approved the Chūō Shinkansen maglev line, connecting Tokyo to Osaka by extending the existing Yamanashi test track. Construction began in 2014, with the first segment from Tokyo to Nagoya an expected to open by 2027. However, by 2026 the opening had been delayed to 2035 at the earliest. The second segment from Nagoya to Osaka was planned to be completed by 2045, but was later brought forward to 2037 with a loan from the Japanese government. The line will have a top operating speed of 500 km/h (310 mph), taking just 40 minutes to cover the 285.6 km/h (177.5 mph) distance between Tokyo and Nagoya. Once the full line is complete, the 438.0 km (272.2 mi) trip between Tokyo and Osaka is expected to take just 67 minutes.

=== Malaysia ===
==== Johor ====
In 2016, there were plans to build a maglev in the state of Johor, linking Pasir Gudang, Kempas, Iskandar Puteri, and other areas. A Chinese company was reported to be conducting a feasibility study into the project, which would be built under a private finance initiative. A possible extension into Singapore was also studied.

=== Malaysia/Singapore ===
A consortium led by UEM Group Bhd and ARA Group proposed maglev technology to link Malaysian cities to Singapore. The idea was first mooted by YTL Group. Its technology partner then was said to be Siemens. High costs sank the proposal. The concept of a high-speed rail link from Kuala Lumpur to Singapore resurfaced. It was cited as a proposed "high impact" project in the Economic Transformation Programme (ETP) that was unveiled in 2010.

=== Philippines ===
==== Cebu Monorail upgrade plan ====
The Cebu Monorail was a planned conventional rubber-tyred monorail, that was to be later upgraded to a maglev. The initial line was to be built as a Bombardier Inovia monorail system, while the maglev upgrade would utilise proprietary "Spin-Induced Lenz's Law" maglev technology from a local inventor.

== Europe ==
=== Germany ===
==== Munich ====
A 37-kilometre (23 mi) Transrapid connection linking the city centre of the Munich to the airport was planned. It promised to reduce the connection time from about 40 minutes by the existing S-Bahn (German city railway system) to 10 minutes. On September 25, 2007, Bavaria announced it would build Europe's first commercial track. The Bavarian government signed a contract with Deutsche Bahn and Transrapid with Siemens and ThyssenKrupp for the 1.85 billion-euro ($2.6 billion) project. However, the project was strongly opposed by Christian Ude, the mayor of Munich. On 27 March 2008, the German government scrapped the project because of a massive cost overrun.

==== Berlin – Hamburg ====
A 292-kilometre (181 mi) Transrapid line linking Berlin to Hamburg. It was cancelled due to lack of funds, and the existing conventional railway line was upgraded for 230 km/h (140 mph) operation by ICE trainsets instead.

==== Metrorapid ====
Metrorapid was a 79-kilometre (49 mi) Transrapid line that was supposed to link Düsseldorf with Dortmund via Duisburg, Essen and Bochum in 37 minutes. The name "Metrorapid" is derived from "metropolitan" and "Transrapid". The project was cancelled in 2003 for financial reasons.

==== Berlin ====
A 5–7-kilometre (3.1–4.3 mi) long pilot line was proposed in November 2023 by the Wegner senate. The Transport System Bögl is supposed to be used on the track, which would be built in the city centre.

==== Nuremberg ====
A 4-kilometre (2.5 mi) long maglev line has been proposed by the Bavarian Minister-President Markus Söder to connect the University of Erlangen-Nuremberg with the Nuremberg Fairground and a hospital. As in Berlin, the Transport System Bögl is supposed to be used.

=== Italy ===
A first proposal was formalised in April 2008, in Brescia, by journalist Andrew Spannaus who recommended a high-speed connection between Malpensa Airport to the cities of Milan, Bergamo, and Brescia.

In March 2011, Nicola Oliva proposed a maglev connection between Pisa International Airport and the cities of Prato and Florence (Santa Maria Novella station and Florence Airport). The travelling time would be reduced from the typical 1 hour 15 minutes to around 20 minutes. The second part of the line would be a connection to Livorno, to integrate maritime, aerial and terrestrial transport systems.

=== Spain ===
In 2011, a two-line, 120-kilometer-long (75-mile) system was proposed for the island of Tenerife. It would connect the island capital Santa Cruz in the north with Costa Adeje in the south and Los Realejos in the northwest with a maximum speed of 270 km/h (170 mph) at an estimated cost of €3 billion.

=== Switzerland ===
==== SwissRapide ====
The SwissRapide AG together with the SwissRapide Consortium was planning and developing the first maglev monorail system for intercity traffic between the country's major cities. SwissRapide was to be financed by private investors. In the long-term, the SwissRapide Express was to connect the major cities north of the Alps between Geneva and St. Gallen, including Lucerne and Basel. The first projects were Bern–Zürich, Lausanne–Geneva as well as Zürich–Winterthur. In 2011, it was claimed that the first line (Lausanne–Geneva or Zürich–Winterthur) could go into service as early as 2020.

==== Swissmetro ====
An earlier project, Swissmetro AG envisioned a partially evacuated underground maglev (a vactrain). As with SwissRapide, Swissmetro envisioned connecting the major cities in Switzerland with one another. In 2011, Swissmetro AG was dissolved and the IPRs from the organisation were passed onto the EPFL in Lausanne.

=== United Kingdom ===
==== London – Glasgow ====
A 500-kilometre-per-hour (310 mph) maglev line was proposed in the United Kingdom from London to Glasgow via Birmingham, Manchester, Leeds, Newcastle and Edinburgh with spurs to Heathrow Airport and Liverpool. It was rejected by the Government in 2007 and the company behind it ceased promotion of the scheme in early 2013.

==== Glasgow – Edinburgh ====
A separate maglev link is also being planned between Glasgow Airport and Glasgow to Edinburgh Airport and Edinburgh which would cut journey time between the two cities from one hour to 15 minutes. Work was set to begin as early as January 2008. However, progress stalled.

==== Liverpool – Hull ====
In 2017, a proposal for an underground 350-kilometre-per-hour (220 mph) maglev network was presented to Transport for the North by Direct City Networks. The plan would link up Liverpool, Manchester, Leeds and Hull in the North of England.

== North America ==
=== Canada ===
==== Toronto Zoo ====
Edmonton-based Magnovate proposed a new ride and transportation system at the Toronto Zoo reviving the Toronto Zoo Domain Ride system, which was closed following two severe accidents in 1994. The Zoo's board unanimously approved the proposal on 29 November 2018.

The company plans to construct and operate the $25 million system on the former route of the Domain Ride (known locally as the Monorail, despite not being considered one) at zero cost to the Zoo and operate it for 15 years, splitting the profits with the Zoo. The ride will serve a single-directional loop around Zoo grounds, serving five stations and likely replacing the current Zoomobile tour tram service. Planned to be operational by 2022 at the earliest, this would be the first commercial maglev system in North America should it be approved.

=== Puerto Rico ===
==== San Juan – Caguas ====
A 26.9-kilometre (16.7-mile) maglev project was proposed linking Tren Urbano's Cupey Station in San Juan with two proposed stations in the city of Caguas, south of San Juan. The maglev line would run along Highway PR-52, connecting both cities. According to American Maglev Technology (AMT), which would the run the project, the cost would be approximately US$380 million.

=== United States ===
==== Pennsylvania Maglev ====
The Pennsylvania Maglev was a proposed Transrapid line that was to connect Pittsburgh Airport to Downtown Pittsburgh, Monroeville and Greensburg. Planning called for extensions eastward to Harrisburg and Philadelphia, duplicating the existing Keystone Corridor. Upon completion, a commute from Pittsburgh to Philadelphia would be reduced to 90–120 minutes. A commuter traversing the Pennsylvania Turnpike would currently spend approximately 5 hours if traveling at the speed limit.

The initial segment was claimed to serve approximately 2.4 million people in the Pittsburgh metropolitan area. The Baltimore proposal competed with the Pittsburgh proposal for a US$90 million federal grant.

==== California-Nevada Interstate Maglev ====
The California-Nevada Interstate Maglev was a proposed maglev line that was to connect Las Vegas to Anaheim. The plan was originally supposed to be part of an I-5 or I-15 expansion plan, but the federal government has ruled it must be separated from interstate public work projects.

Since the federal government decision, private groups from Nevada have proposed a line running from Las Vegas to Los Angeles with stops in Primm, Nevada; Baker, California; and points throughout Riverside County into Los Angeles.

==== Northeast Maglev ====
The Northeast Maglev is a maglev proposal using Superconducting Maglev (SCMAGLEV) technology developed by the Central Japan Railway Company. The Northeast Maglev would ultimately connect major Northeast metropolitan hubs and airports with a goal of one-hour service from Washington, D.C. to New York City. The first leg of the system would run between Washington, DC and Baltimore, Maryland with an intermediate stop at BWI Airport.

On August 1, 2025, the Trump administration halted its review of the project, placing it on indefinite hold and possibly killing it.

==== San Diego-Imperial County airport ====
In 2006, San Diego commissioned a study for a maglev line to a proposed airport located in Imperial County. SANDAG claimed that the concept would be an "airports [sic] without terminals", allowing passengers to check in at a terminal in San Diego ("satellite terminals"), take the train to the airport and directly board the airplane. In addition, the train would have the potential to carry freight. Further studies were requested although no funding was agreed. The cost was estimated at approximately US$10 billion for the 120–150 km (75–93 mi) run, not including the cost of construction of the airport.

==== Atlanta – Chattanooga ====
The proposed Atlanta to Chattanooga maglev route would run from Hartsfield-Jackson Atlanta International Airport, through Atlanta, continuing to the northern suburbs of Atlanta, and possibly further to Chattanooga. Official proposals also exist to extend the route to Nashville. If built, the maglev line would rival Atlanta's current subway system, the Metropolitan Atlanta Rapid Transit Authority (MARTA), the rail system of which includes a major branch running from downtown Atlanta to Hartsfield-Jackson airport.

==== Orlando maglev ====
In December 2012, the Florida Department of Transportation gave conditional approval to a proposal by American Maglev to build a privately run 24-kilometre (14.9 mi), 5-station line from Orlando International Airport to Orange County Convention Center. The Department requested a technical assessment and said there would be a request for proposals issued to reveal any competing plans. The route requires the use of a public right of way. If the first phase succeeded American Maglev would propose two further phases, respectively 7.9 and 31.2 kilometres (4.9 and 19.4 mi)) long, to carry the line to Walt Disney World.

==== Old Dominion University maglev ====
In 1999, Old Dominion University agreed to work with American Maglev of Atlanta to construct an on-campus student transportation link of less than 1.6-kilometre (1 mi) — using a smart train / dumb track design in which most sensors, magnets, and computation were located on the train rather than the track. Several other institutes of higher learning rejected the project with cost and safety concerns. While projected to cost less to build per mile (1.6 km) than existing systems, the ODU maglev was never operational. After far exceeding its projected $14 million budget, a groundbreaking was held in 2001, the project was completed in 2002; and the technology failed: the vehicle lost its "float" and come to a full friction stop on top of the rail, damaging much of the system. American Maglev and ODU dissolved their relationship and the project became an internal university research project. In October 2006, the research team performed an unscheduled test of the car that went smoothly. The system was subsequently removed from the power grid for nearby construction. In February 2009, the team retested the sled and was successful despite power outages on campus. ODU subsequently partnered with a Massachusetts-based company to test another maglev train. MagneMotion Inc. was expected to bring its prototype maglev vehicle, about the size of a van, to the campus to test in 2010. Disassembly of the maglev track and supports began in May 2023, effectively putting an end to the project.

==== Union Pacific freight conveyor ====
In 2008, there were plans for an 8-kilometre (5.0 mi) maglev container shuttle to be built for Union Pacific to connect the Ports of Los Angeles and Long Beach, with UP's intermodal container transfer facility. The system would be based on "passive" technology, with the vehicles containing only permanent magnets, eliminating the need for an onboard power supply. The system is being designed by General Atomics.

== Oceania ==
=== Australia ===
Sydney-Illawarra

A maglev route was proposed between Sydney and Wollongong. The proposal came to prominence in the mid-1990s. The Sydney–Wollongong commuter corridor is the largest in Australia, with upwards of 20,000 people commuting each day. Existing trains use the Illawarra line, between the cliff face of the Illawarra escarpment and the Pacific Ocean, with travel times about 2 hours. The proposal would cut travel times to 20 minutes.

Melbourne

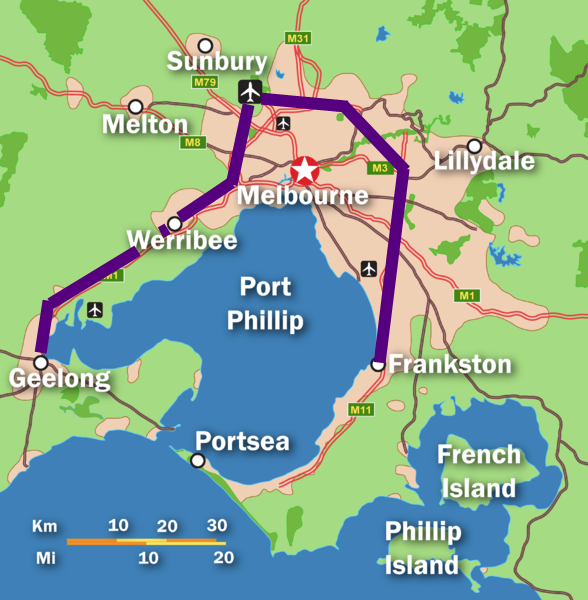
The proposed Melbourne maglev connecting the city of Geelong through Metropolitan Melbourne's outer suburban growth corridors, Tullamarine and Avalon domestic in and international terminals in under 20 min. and on to Frankston, Victoria, in under 30 min.

In late 2008, a proposal was put forward to the Government of Victoria by ThyssenKrupp Transrapid to build a privately funded and operated maglev line to service the Greater Melbourne metropolitan area. The proposal was in response to the Eddington Transport Report that did not investigate above-ground transport options. The maglev would service a population of over 4 million and the proposal was costed at A$8 billion.

However, despite road congestion and Australia's highest roadspace per capita, the government dismissed the proposal in favour of road expansion including an A$8.5 billion road tunnel, $6 billion extension of the Eastlink to the Western Ring Road and a $700 million Frankston Bypass.
