= Yinchuan Metro =

Proposed railway network in Yinchuan, Ningxia, China

Yinchuan Metro is a proposed urban rapid transit network in Yinchuan, the capital of Ningxia, in Northwest China.

== Background ==
Yinchuan is the capital and largest city of Ningxia Hui Autonomous Region. It has a population of over 2 million. The city has experienced a significant growth in population and economic importance over the past decades, partly because of China's Western Development strategy.

Transport within and to Yinchuan has lagged behind the rest of China and nearby provincial capitals. Until completion of the Yinchuan–Xi'an high-speed railway in 2020, the city did not have any high-speed rail connections.

In 2018 a 9.7 km monorail long loop line in Yinchuan's Flower Expo Garden opened, using BYD SkyRail technology.

In 2024, the city government stated that the city did not meet the GDP and population requirements of China's policy for urban rail planning and construction to start construction of the metro system.

== Planned network ==
The proposed network is to consist of 6 lines totaling 227.8 km (141.5 mi). The plans were first announced in 2016.

- Line 1 will form an east–west backbone of the urban area, starting from Xixia Passenger Station planned and ending at Yinchuan East railway station.
- Line 2 will form a north–south backbone of the urban area, to run from Yuanbao Lake in Fengdeng to Wangyin Road in Wangyuan.
- Line 3 will form a northeast to southwest backbone, starting from Helan County and ending in the Yinchuan Economic Development Zone.
- Line 4 will be a parallel east–west line in the northern part of the city. Together with Line 3, it will form a loop around the city center. It will run from Yinchuan Economic Development Zone to Baliqiao station.
- The Binning Line will be a suburban rail line, part of the China Railway network to connect the city center to Binhe New Area and Yinchuan Hedong International Airport.
- The Yonghe Line will use light rail technology and be a north–south suburban line to run from Helan County to Yongning County, with possible extensions to Lingwu, Litong District, Pingluo County and Shahu.

== See also ==
- Xining Metro, proposed urban rapid transit network in Xining, Qinghai
- Urban rail transit in China
