= Poços de Caldas Monorail =

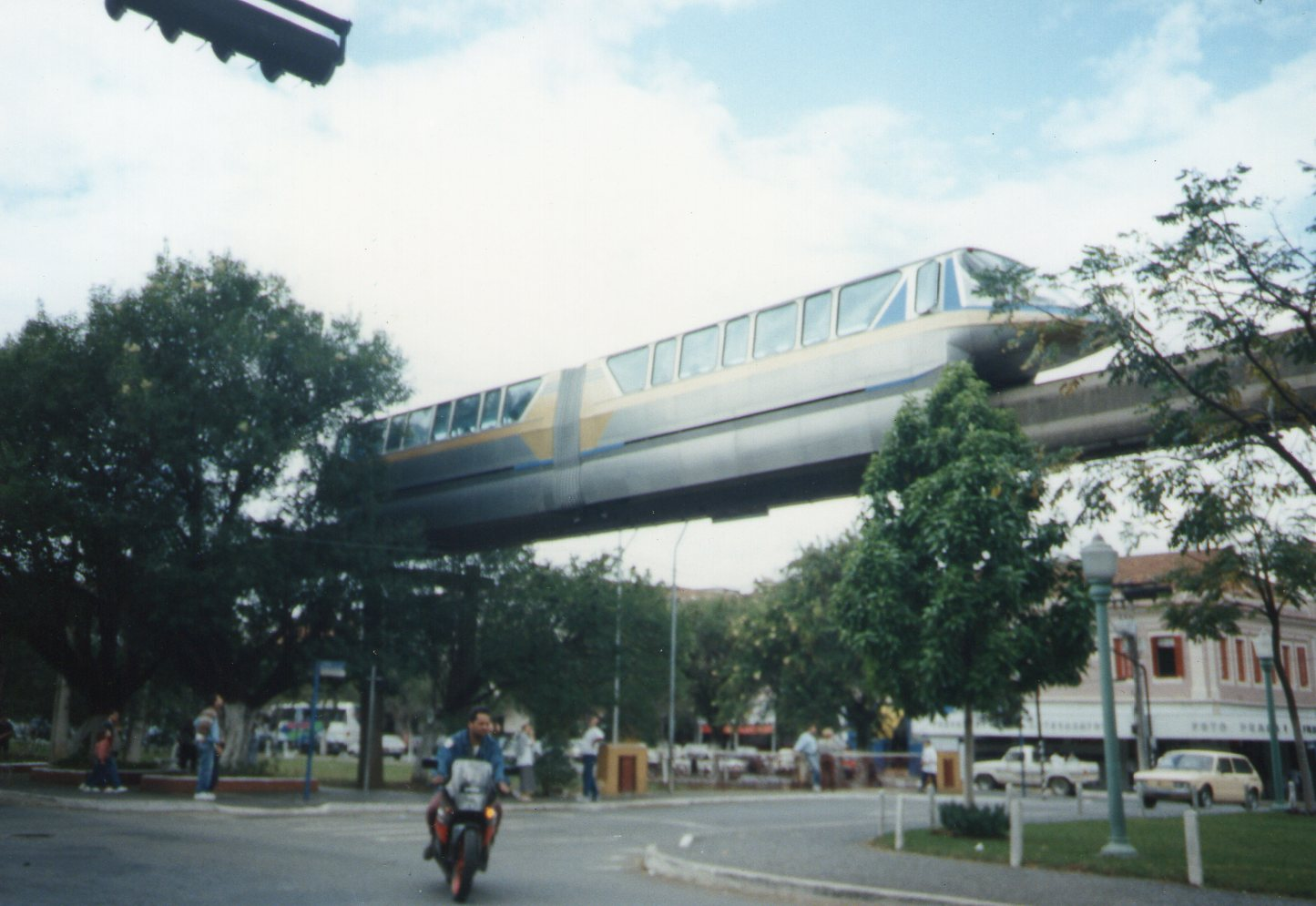
- Poços de Caldas Monorail

Overview
- Native name: Brazilian Portuguese: Monotrilho de Poços de Caldas
- Owner: J. Ferreira Ltda.
- Locale: Poços de Caldas, Minas Gerais, Brazil
- Transit type: Monorail
- Number of lines: 1
- Number of stations: 11

Operation
- Began operation: 1991
- Ended operation: 2003
- Operator: J. Ferreira Ltda.
- Number of vehicles: 1
- Train length: 2

Technical
- System length: 6 km (3.7 mi)

The Poços de Caldas Monorail was a monorail system that served the city of Poços de Caldas in the state of Minas Gerais, Brazil. Privately owned, the single elevated line connected the bus station to the centre of the city, a total of 6 km (3.7 mi) and 11 stations. Its operation started in 1991, only in test phases. In 2000, after the opening, the train derailed in a curve, leading to the opening in the floors of the car, no one was hurt. Since 2003, the system has been out of service and a section of the track was destroyed, making it impossible immediately to resume operations. There are plans for its renovation and for services to be reinstated.
