= Guilin Rail Transit =

Planned monorail system in Guilin, China

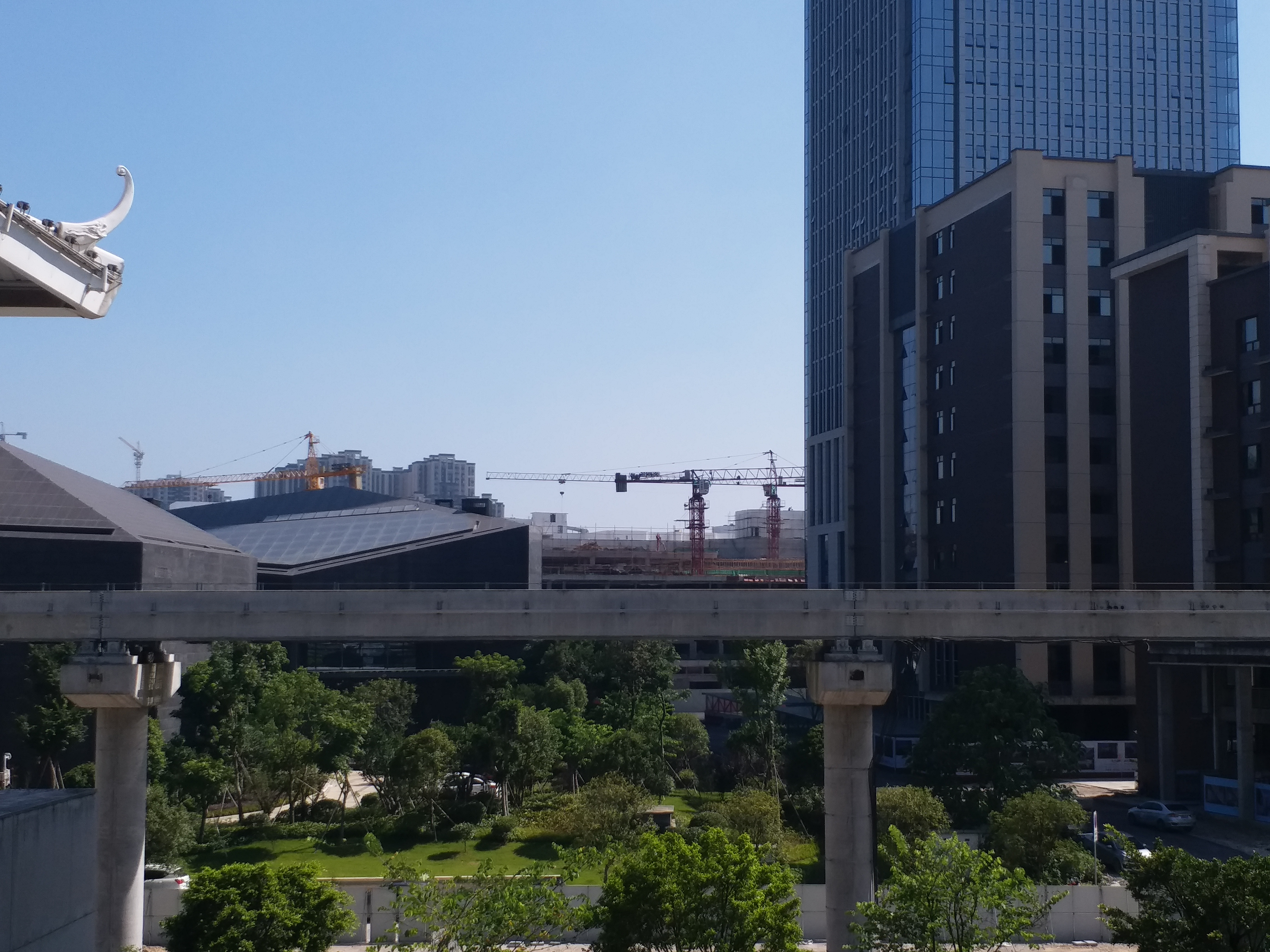

Overview
- Locale: Guilin, Guangxi, China
- Transit type: Rapid transit
- Number of lines: 1 (Phase 1)
- Number of stations: 13 (Phase 1)

Operation
- Operation will start: 2025

Technical
- System length: 29.23 km (18.16 mi) (Phase 1)

Guilin Rail Transit (Chinese: 桂林轨道交通; pinyin: Guìlín Guǐdào Jiāotōng), also known as Guilin Skyrail, is a stalled monorail metro system in Guilin, Guangxi, China. SkyRail is the branding of the BYD developed monorail system. There are 7 lines planned by 2040 with 117 stations and a total length of 273.2 kilometres. Line 1 was planned to be operational by 2018, and it would have been 29.23 km long with 13 stations.

In 2020, the Exhibition Center demonstration station, featuring a static monorail train, was unveiled. A first 2.89 km (1.80 mi) section was under construction between the Exhibition Center station and Shanshui Park, entirely in Lingui District. In January 2021 testing on this first section commenced. It was planned that this section would become part of the line between Guilin Liangjiang International Airport and Guilin Railway Station.

== Lines ==
Line	Terminals		Planned Opening	Length km	Stations
1	Liangjiang Airport	Guilin Railway Station	Unknown	29.23	13
2	Lingchuan	Yanshan Wanda	Unknown	45.4	32
3	Guilin West Railway Station	Ronghe Fengjing	Unknown	23.7	21
4	Qixing Road	Mopanshan Pier	Unknown	17.1	13
5	Longmen	Yangshuo	Unknown	80.0	10
6	Guilin West Railway Station	Yangtang	Unknown	33.5	12
7	Lingui New District	Qixing	Unknown	26.7	13
