= Orlando maglev =

Orlando Maglev
- Concept Drawings

Overview
- Status: Canceled
- Locale: Orlando, Florida
- Termini: Orlando International Airport; Orange County Convention Center

Service
- Type: Maglev

Technical
- Line length: ≥10.35 miles (16.66 km)

A proposed US$400 million magnetic levitation train system would have connected the Orlando International Airport and the Orange County Convention Center in Orlando, Florida, with a stop at the Florida Mall. The privately funded 13.8-mile (22.2 km) train line would be built by American Maglev Technology and was once expected to be operational by 2017. If completed, the train would have been the first commercial maglev system in North America.

The plan was canceled in late 2015, when the Orlando International Airport board voted unanimously to begin negotiations for right-of-way for a new light-rail system to connect to International Drive and the convention center, rather than a maglev.
