= Mumbai Maglev =

Proposed maglev train in Mumbai, India

The Mumbai Maglev is a 2007 proposal for a Maglev line serving Mumbai. A total of six routes were proposed in the Mumbai Metropolitan Region, with distances ranging from 20 to 50 km.

In February 2020, the Mumbai Rail Vikas Corporation (MRVC) wrote to the Maharashtra state government and the Indian Railway Board seeking an in-principle approval for the project as a public private partnership. The plan is for a 55 km (34 mi) elevated line connecting Chhatrapati Shivaji Terminus (CSTM) and Panvel with a branch line to Navi Mumbai International Airport. The request was made after Swiss company SwissRapide AG, in a joint venture with Lasane Infra Private Limited (India), sent an expression of interest to develop and run the corridor at an estimated cost of Rs 13,347 crore.

As of July 2021, there is no indication the proposal has proceeded further.
