= BYD SkyRail =

Monorail system

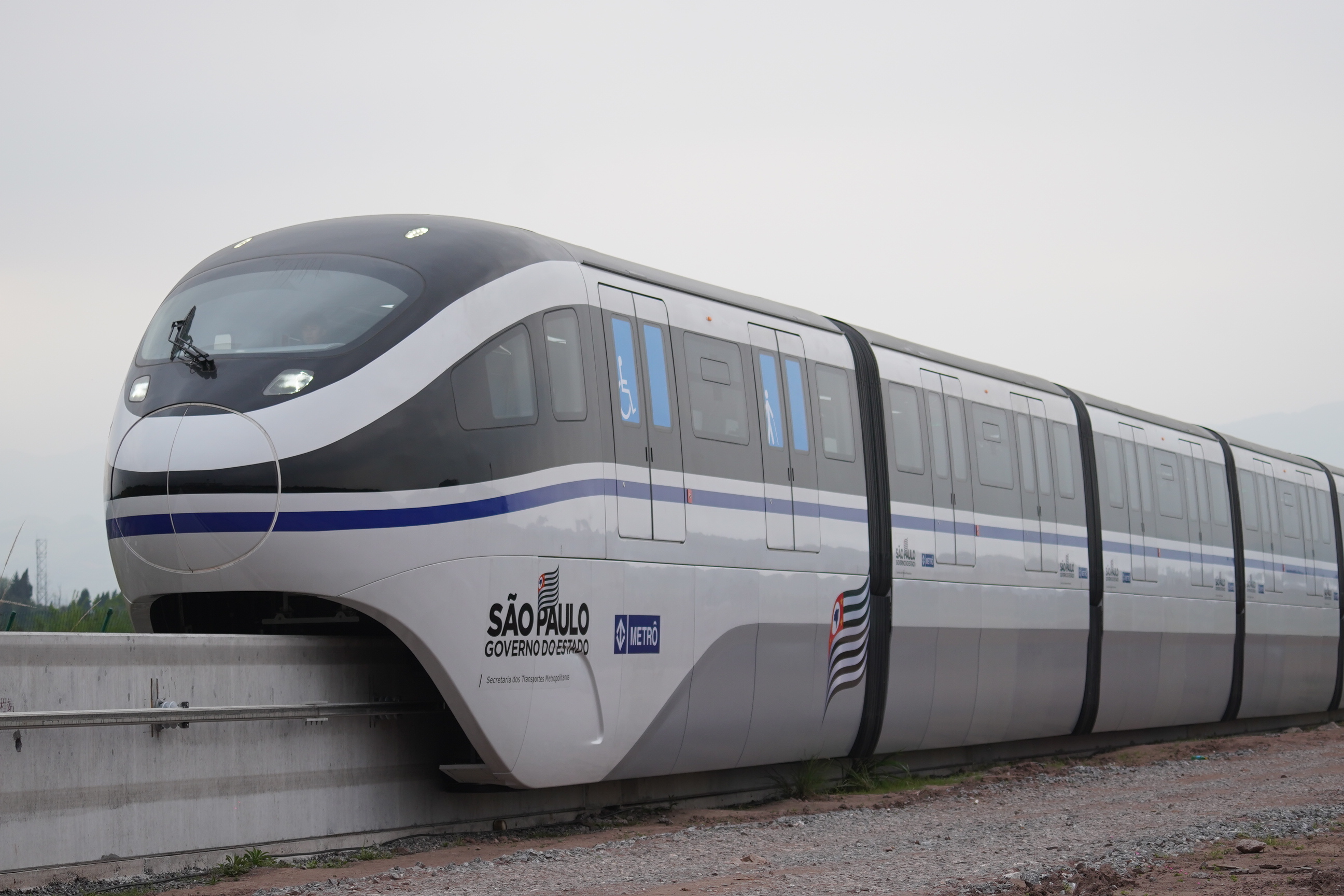
- 5-car set used by Metro de São Paulo

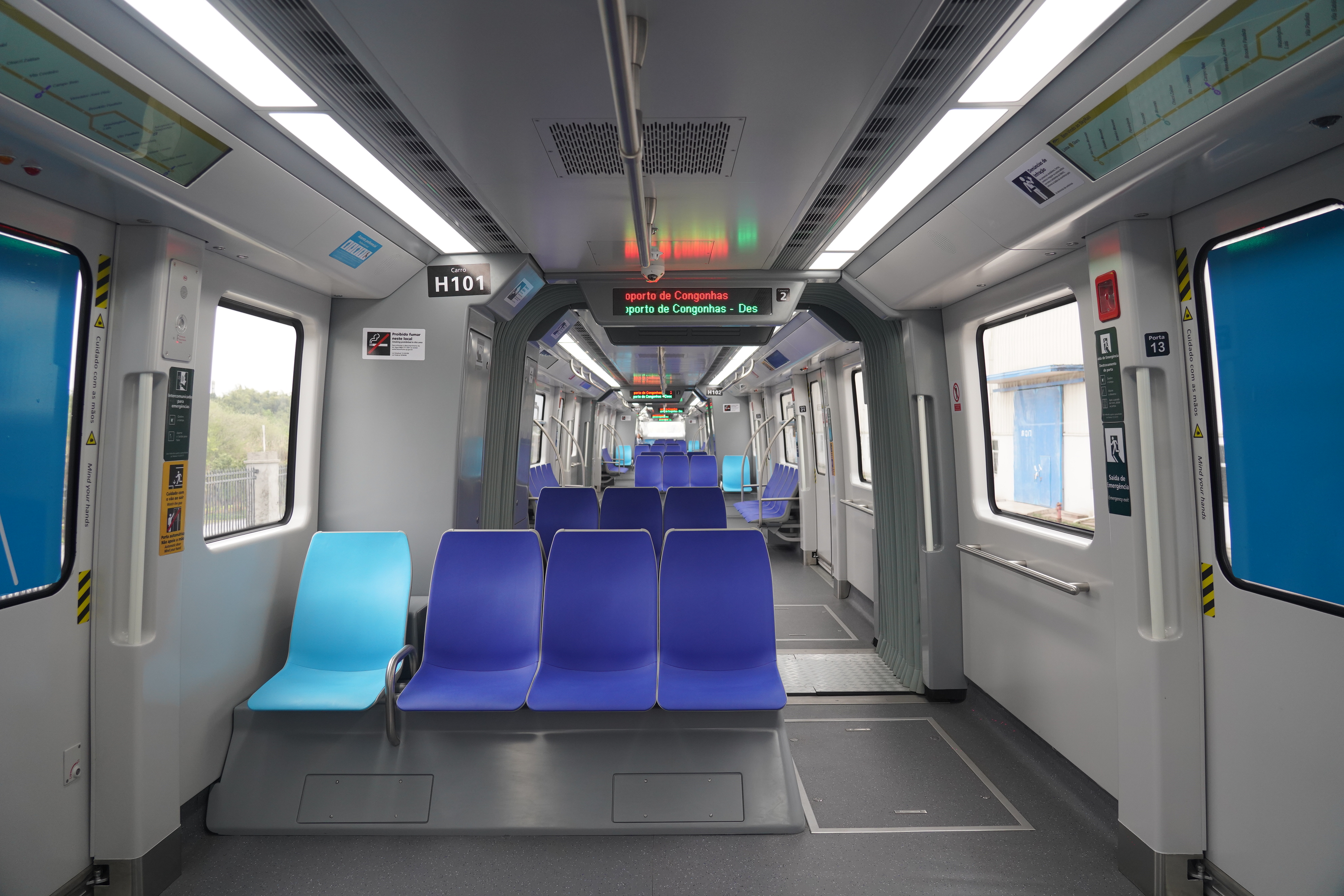
- The interior of a unit
- In service: 2017–
- Manufacturer: BYD Company
- Formation: 2–8 car sets

The BYD SkyRail, is a monorail electrical multiple unit (EMU) type train system designed by Chinese company BYD. The design is currently the main guided transit product offering, alongside the BYD SkyShuttle. The first customer was the Yinchuan Metro monorail project.

== Design ==
SkyRail was designed during a five year program, costing RMB 5 billion. Trains can be equipped with an autonomous driving system and a back-up battery. The trains are designed with a top speed of 80 kph.

== Users ==
=== Operational ===
- Yinchuan Metro – Yinchuan, China
  - Late 2017 a loop line serving Yinchuan's Flower Expo Garden opened.
- Guilin Rail Transit - Guilin, China
  - Test track opened in 2020, with planned passenger service late 2025.
- Line 17 (São Paulo Metro) – São Paulo, Brazil
  - Opened on 31 March 2026.

=== Contracted ===
- Guang'an Metro – Guang'an, China
  - A contract was signed and construction began in 2018 but is on hold since 2020.

=== Cancelled ===
- Skyrail Bahia – Salvador, Bahia, Brazil
  - Quantity: 28 sets.

== See also ==
- Monorails in China
