= Chathuranga Abeysinghe =

Sri Lankan politician

Hon. Chathuranga Abeysinghe MP
- චතුරංග අබේසිංහ சதுரங்க அபேசிங்க

Member of Parliament for Colombo District
- Incumbent
- Assumed office 21 November 2024
- Majority: 127,166 Preferential votes

Personal details
- Born: November 22, 1983 (age 42)
- Party: National People's Power
- Parent: Nihal Abeysinghe (father)
- Education: Nalanda College, Colombo; University of Sri Jayewardenepura
- Occupation: Politician
- Profession: Chartered Global Management Accountant

Chathuranga Abeysinghe is a Sri Lankan politician, Deputy Minister of Industry and Entrepreneurship Development and a member of the Parliament of Sri Lanka from Colombo Electoral District since 2024 as a member of the National People's Power. He is also a national executive committee Member of NPP.

Son of NPP General Secretary and Parliamentarian Dr. Nihal Abeysinghe, he is a Chartered Global Management Accountant of CIMA UK,and a graduate of the University of Sri Jayewardenepura. Chathuranga is an alumnus of Nalanda College, Colombo. He worked for MAS Holdings from 2007 to 2022, before becoming a freelance Data Science and Analytics Consultant.

In January 2025, Minister Abeysinghe gained attention in local media when he proposed the increase revenue from Coconut exports from US$850 million to US$1 billion annually by stopping traditional household use of Coconut in the preparation of Pol sambol and coconut milk-based curries.

== Electoral history ==
Electoral history of Chathuranga Abeysinghe
Election	Constituency	Party	Votes	Result	Ref
2024 parliamentary	Colombo District	National People's Power	127,166	Elected	
