= Nihal Abeysinghe =

General secretary of the National People's Power

Hon. Nihal Abeysinghe MP
- නිහාල් අබේසිංහ நிஹால் அபேசிங்க

General Secretary of the National People's Power
- Incumbent
- Assumed office 2020
- Leader: Anura Kumara Dissanayake
- Preceded by: Lakshman Nipuna Arachchi

Deputy Director of the Institute for Research & Development
- Incumbent
- Assumed office 2004
- Chairman: Dr. Godwin Kodituwakku

Chief Epidemiologist in Sri Lanka
- In office 2003–2008
- Preceded by: Dr. T.A. Kulatilake
- Succeeded by: Dr. Paba Palihawadana

Member of Parliament for Kalutara District
- Incumbent
- Assumed office 21 November 2024
- Majority: 96,721 Preferential votes

Personal details
- Born: Nihal Abeysinghe Kalutara, Dominion of Ceylon
- Party: National People's Power
- Children: Chathuranga Abeysinghe
- Education: Taxila Central College, Horana; University of Colombo
- Occupation: Medical Doctor
- Profession: Epidemiologist
- Known for: Consultant in Community Medicine, World Health Organization Regional Office South East Asia

Nihal Abeysinghe is a Sri Lankan epidemiologist, and socialist politician who is the general secretary of the ruling National People's Power (NPP).

== Career ==
Abeysinghe having gained his MBBS and MSc, became a consultant epidemiologist and went on to become the deputy director of the Institute for Research & Development. Following his retirement, he joined the NPP as its general secretary.

Abeysinghe is contesting the 2024 Sri Lankan parliamentary election as a candidate from the NPP from the Kalutara District, along with his son Chathuranga Abeysinghe is contesting from the Colombo District.
