= Gampaha Polling Division =

Gampaha
- Polling Division
- Interactive map of Gampaha
- Coordinates: 7.074904°N 79.991512°E
- Country: Sri Lanka
- Province: Western Province, Sri Lanka
- Electoral District: Gampaha Electoral District

Area
  - Total: 97.5 km^{2} (37.6 sq mi)

Population (2012)
  - Total: 197,667
  - Density: 2,027/km^{2} (5,250/sq mi)
- ISO 3166 code: EC-02H

The Gampaha Polling Division is a Polling Division in the Gampaha Electoral District, in the Western Province, Sri Lanka.

== Presidential Election Results ==
=== Summary ===
The winner of Gampaha has matched the final country result 5 out of 8 times. Hence, Gampaha is a Weak Bellwether for Presidential Elections.

Year	Gampaha	Gampaha Electoral District	MAE %	Sri Lanka	MAE %
2024	NPP	NPP		NPP	
2019	SLPP	SLPP	7.80%	SLPP	14.86%
2015	UPFA	NDF	4.38%	NDF	6.01%
2010	UPFA	UPFA	6.61%	UPFA	9.89%
2005	UPFA	UPFA	8.86%	UPFA	13.12%
1999	PA	PA	5.26%	PA	10.29%
1994	PA	PA	6.01%	PA	8.23%
1988	SLFP	SLFP	6.19%	UNP	9.09%
1982	SLFP	UNP	4.96%	UNP	6.76%
Matches/Mean MAE	5/8	7/8	6.26%	8/8	9.78%

=== 2019 Sri Lankan Presidential Election ===
Party	Gampaha		Gampaha Electoral District		Sri Lanka	
Party	Votes	%	Votes	%	Votes	%
SLPP	84,507	67.31%	855,870	59.28%	6,924,255	52.25%
NDF	31,984	25.48%	494,671	34.26%	5,564,239	41.99%
NMPP	6,256	4.98%	61,760	4.28%	418,553	3.16%
Other Parties (with < 1%)	2,800	2.23%	31,499	2.18%	345,452	2.61%
Valid Votes	125,547	99.06%	1,443,800	98.92%	13,252,499	98.99%
Rejected Votes	1,191	0.94%	15,751	1.08%	135,452	1.01%
Total Polled	126,738	83.70%	1,459,551	83.31%	13,387,951	83.71%
Registered Electors	151,418		1,751,892		15,992,568	

=== 2015 Sri Lankan Presidential Election ===
Party	Gampaha		Gampaha Electoral District		Sri Lanka	
Party	Votes	%	Votes	%	Votes	%
UPFA	63,962	53.95%	664,347	49.49%	5,768,090	47.58%
NDF	53,922	45.48%	669,007	49.83%	6,217,162	51.28%
Other Parties (with < 1%)	680	0.57%	9,142	0.68%	138,200	1.14%
Valid Votes	118,564	98.98%	1,342,496	98.92%	12,123,452	98.85%
Rejected Votes	1,222	1.02%	14,647	1.08%	140,925	1.15%
Total Polled	119,786	81.33%	1,357,143	80.77%	12,264,377	78.69%
Registered Electors	147,280		1,680,263		15,585,942	

=== 2010 Sri Lankan Presidential Election ===
Party	Gampaha		Gampaha Electoral District		Sri Lanka	
Party	Votes	%	Votes	%	Votes	%
UPFA	71,811	68.44%	718,716	61.66%	6,015,934	57.88%
NDF	32,262	30.75%	434,506	37.28%	4,173,185	40.15%
Other Parties (with < 1%)	854	0.81%	12,426	1.07%	204,494	1.97%
Valid Votes	104,927	99.35%	1,165,648	99.24%	10,393,613	99.03%
Rejected Votes	682	0.65%	8,960	0.76%	101,838	0.97%
Total Polled	105,609	79.05%	1,174,608	78.03%	10,495,451	66.70%
Registered Electors	133,606		1,505,363		15,734,587	

=== 2005 Sri Lankan Presidential Election ===
Party	Gampaha		Gampaha Electoral District		Sri Lanka	
Party	Votes	%	Votes	%	Votes	%
UPFA	62,018	63.78%	596,698	54.78%	4,887,152	50.29%
UNP	34,376	35.35%	481,764	44.23%	4,706,366	48.43%
Other Parties (with < 1%)	847	0.87%	10,815	0.99%	123,521	1.27%
Valid Votes	97,241	99.04%	1,089,277	98.94%	9,717,039	98.88%
Rejected Votes	944	0.96%	11,724	1.06%	109,869	1.12%
Total Polled	98,185	78.73%	1,101,001	79.17%	9,826,908	69.51%
Registered Electors	124,714		1,390,691		14,136,979	

=== 1999 Sri Lankan Presidential Election ===
Party	Gampaha		Gampaha Electoral District		Sri Lanka	
Party	Votes	%	Votes	%	Votes	%
PA	51,606	61.67%	532,796	56.58%	4,312,157	51.12%
UNP	26,257	31.38%	353,969	37.59%	3,602,748	42.71%
JVP	4,433	5.30%	40,472	4.30%	343,927	4.08%
Other Parties (with < 1%)	1,386	1.66%	14,382	1.53%	176,679	2.09%
Valid Votes	83,682	97.92%	941,619	97.84%	8,435,754	97.69%
Rejected Votes	1,780	2.08%	20,768	2.16%	199,536	2.31%
Total Polled	85,462	76.43%	962,387	77.12%	8,635,290	72.17%
Registered Electors	111,814		1,247,860		11,965,536	

=== 1994 Sri Lankan Presidential Election ===
Party	Gampaha		Gampaha Electoral District		Sri Lanka	
Party	Votes	%	Votes	%	Votes	%
PA	51,197	70.81%	550,654	64.74%	4,709,205	62.28%
UNP	20,094	27.79%	288,608	33.93%	2,715,283	35.91%
Other Parties (with < 1%)	1,011	1.40%	11,256	1.32%	137,040	1.81%
Valid Votes	72,302	98.69%	850,518	98.48%	7,561,526	98.03%
Rejected Votes	958	1.31%	13,137	1.52%	151,706	1.97%
Total Polled	73,260	72.96%	863,655	74.16%	7,713,232	69.12%
Registered Electors	100,416		1,164,625		11,158,880	

=== 1988 Sri Lankan Presidential Election ===
Party	Gampaha		Gampaha Electoral District		Sri Lanka	
Party	Votes	%	Votes	%	Votes	%
SLFP	34,340	55.27%	355,553	48.83%	2,289,857	44.95%
UNP	25,948	41.77%	350,092	48.08%	2,569,199	50.43%
SLMP	1,839	2.96%	22,467	3.09%	235,701	4.63%
Valid Votes	62,127	98.85%	728,112	98.63%	5,094,754	98.24%
Rejected Votes	721	1.15%	10,108	1.37%	91,499	1.76%
Total Polled	62,848	73.57%	738,220	74.93%	5,186,256	55.87%
Registered Electors	85,424		985,206		9,283,143	

=== 1982 Sri Lankan Presidential Election ===
Party	Gampaha		Gampaha Electoral District		Sri Lanka	
Party	Votes	%	Votes	%	Votes	%
SLFP	28,532	48.53%	301,808	43.31%	2,546,348	39.05%
UNP	27,845	47.36%	365,847	52.50%	3,450,815	52.93%
JVP	1,942	3.30%	23,701	3.40%	273,428	4.19%
Other Parties (with < 1%)	470	0.80%	5,491	0.79%	249,460	3.83%
Valid Votes	58,789	99.13%	696,847	99.15%	6,520,156	98.78%
Rejected Votes	517	0.87%	5,992	0.85%	80,470	1.22%
Total Polled	59,306	81.95%	702,839	82.70%	6,600,626	80.15%
Registered Electors	72,371		849,896		8,235,358	

== Parliamentary Election Results ==
=== Summary ===
The winner of Gampaha has matched the final country result 5 out of 7 times. Hence, Gampaha is a Weak Bellwether for Parliamentary Elections.

Year	Gampaha	Gampaha Electoral District	MAE %	Sri Lanka	MAE %
2015	UPFA	UNP	6.05%	UNP	6.29%
2010	UPFA	UPFA	6.08%	UPFA	8.06%
2004	UPFA	UPFA	7.38%	UPFA	10.06%
2001	PA	UNP	5.18%	UNP	8.18%
2000	PA	PA	5.06%	PA	6.97%
1994	PA	PA	6.01%	PA	10.46%
1989	UNP	UNP	4.03%	UNP	4.71%
Matches/Mean MAE	5/7	7/7	5.68%	7/7	7.82%

=== 2015 Sri Lankan Parliamentary Election ===
Party	Gampaha		Gampaha Electoral District		Sri Lanka	
Party	Votes	%	Votes	%	Votes	%
UPFA	53,901	50.38%	549,958	44.96%	4,732,664	42.48%
UNP	42,585	39.81%	577,004	47.17%	5,098,916	45.77%
JVP	9,754	9.12%	87,880	7.18%	544,154	4.88%
Other Parties (with < 1%)	739	0.69%	8,332	0.68%	81,501	0.73%
Valid Votes	106,979	95.89%	1,223,174	95.51%	11,140,333	95.35%
Rejected Votes	4,457	3.99%	56,246	4.39%	516,926	4.42%
Total Polled	111,569	75.75%	1,280,647	78.21%	11,684,111	77.66%
Registered Electors	147,280		1,637,537		15,044,490	

=== 2010 Sri Lankan Parliamentary Election ===
Party	Gampaha		Gampaha Electoral District		Sri Lanka	
Party	Votes	%	Votes	%	Votes	%
UPFA	58,268	69.62%	589,476	63.40%	4,846,388	60.38%
UNP	17,976	21.48%	266,523	28.67%	2,357,057	29.37%
DNA	7,188	8.59%	69,747	7.50%	441,251	5.50%
Other Parties (with < 1%)	266	0.32%	3,985	0.43%	19,003	0.24%
Valid Votes	83,698	95.44%	929,731	94.83%	8,026,322	96.03%
Rejected Votes	3,930	4.48%	50,234	5.12%	581,465	6.96%
Total Polled	87,698	65.64%	980,467	65.06%	8,358,246	59.29%
Registered Electors	133,606		1,506,969		14,097,690	

=== 2004 Sri Lankan Parliamentary Election ===
Party	Gampaha		Gampaha Electoral District		Sri Lanka	
Party	Votes	%	Votes	%	Votes	%
UPFA	51,944	58.64%	509,963	51.52%	4,223,126	45.70%
UNP	24,652	27.83%	367,572	37.14%	3,486,792	37.73%
JHU	11,357	12.82%	102,516	10.36%	552,723	5.98%
Other Parties (with < 1%)	624	0.70%	9,691	0.98%	57,229	0.62%
Valid Votes	88,577	96.19%	989,742	95.96%	9,241,931	94.52%
Rejected Votes	3,485	3.78%	41,462	4.02%	534,452	5.47%
Total Polled	92,082	76.21%	1,031,464	77.72%	9,777,821	75.74%
Registered Electors	120,833		1,327,145		12,909,631	

=== 2001 Sri Lankan Parliamentary Election ===
Party	Gampaha		Gampaha Electoral District		Sri Lanka	
Party	Votes	%	Votes	%	Votes	%
PA	41,519	46.94%	428,780	43.08%	3,330,815	37.19%
UNP	32,479	36.72%	437,289	43.94%	4,086,026	45.62%
JVP	12,791	14.46%	113,990	11.45%	815,353	9.10%
SU	1,090	1.23%	8,105	0.81%	50,665	0.57%
Other Parties (with < 1%)	573	0.65%	7,066	0.71%	87,161	0.97%
Valid Votes	88,452	96.82%	995,230	96.30%	8,955,844	94.77%
Rejected Votes	2,909	3.18%	38,187	3.70%	494,009	5.23%
Total Polled	91,361	78.24%	1,033,417	80.36%	9,449,878	76.03%
Registered Electors	116,768		1,285,973		12,428,762	

=== 2000 Sri Lankan Parliamentary Election ===
Party	Gampaha		Gampaha Electoral District		Sri Lanka	
Party	Votes	%	Votes	%	Votes	%
PA	45,394	53.55%	470,018	48.87%	3,899,329	45.33%
UNP	27,794	32.79%	378,328	39.34%	3,451,765	40.12%
JVP	8,284	9.77%	73,110	7.60%	518,725	6.03%
SU	2,434	2.87%	20,297	2.11%	127,859	1.49%
Other Parties (with < 1%)	861	1.02%	19,956	2.08%	319,123	3.71%
Valid Votes	84,767	N/A	961,709	N/A	8,602,617	N/A

=== 1994 Sri Lankan Parliamentary Election ===
Party	Gampaha		Gampaha Electoral District		Sri Lanka	
Party	Votes	%	Votes	%	Votes	%
PA	47,822	62.68%	509,030	56.79%	3,887,805	48.94%
UNP	27,133	35.56%	375,631	41.91%	3,498,370	44.04%
SLPF	1,340	1.76%	11,627	1.30%	90,078	1.13%
Valid Votes	76,295	96.88%	896,288	96.39%	7,943,688	95.20%
Rejected Votes	2,456	3.12%	33,553	3.61%	400,395	4.80%
Total Polled	78,751	78.42%	929,841	79.65%	8,344,095	74.75%
Registered Electors	100,416		1,167,469		11,163,064	

=== 1989 Sri Lankan Parliamentary Election ===
Party	Gampaha		Gampaha Electoral District		Sri Lanka	
Party	Votes	%	Votes	%	Votes	%
UNP	30,376	50.27%	385,733	54.14%	2,838,005	50.71%
SLFP	27,765	45.95%	294,490	41.34%	1,785,369	31.90%
USA	1,426	2.36%	21,665	3.04%	141,983	2.54%
ELJP	859	1.42%	10,549	1.48%	67,723	1.21%
Valid Votes	60,426	96.34%	712,437	95.64%	5,596,468	93.87%
Rejected Votes	2,297	3.66%	32,497	4.36%	365,563	6.13%
Total Polled	62,723	75.85%	744,934	76.82%	5,962,031	63.60%
Registered Electors	82,689		969,658		9,374,164	

== Demographics ==
=== Ethnicity ===
The Gampaha Polling Division has a Sinhalese majority (98.8%) . In comparison, the Gampaha Electoral District (which contains the Gampaha Polling Division) has a Sinhalese majority (90.5%)

Ethnicity in Gampaha
1. Sinhalese (98.8%)
2. Other (1.20%)

=== Religion ===
The Gampaha Polling Division has a Buddhist majority (87.6%) and a significant Roman Catholic population (10.7%) . In comparison, the Gampaha Electoral District (which contains the Gampaha Polling Division) has a Buddhist majority (71.3%) and a significant Roman Catholic population (19.5%)

Religion in Gampaha
1. Buddhist (87.6%)
2. Roman Catholic (10.7%)
3. Other Christian (1.10%)
4. Other (0.70%)
