= 2024 Elpitiya Pradeshiya Sabha election =

- 26 October 2024

All 30 council seats of the Elpitiya Pradeshiya Sabha 16 seats needed for a majority
- Registered: 55,643
- Turnout: 66.18% (▼12.68 pp)
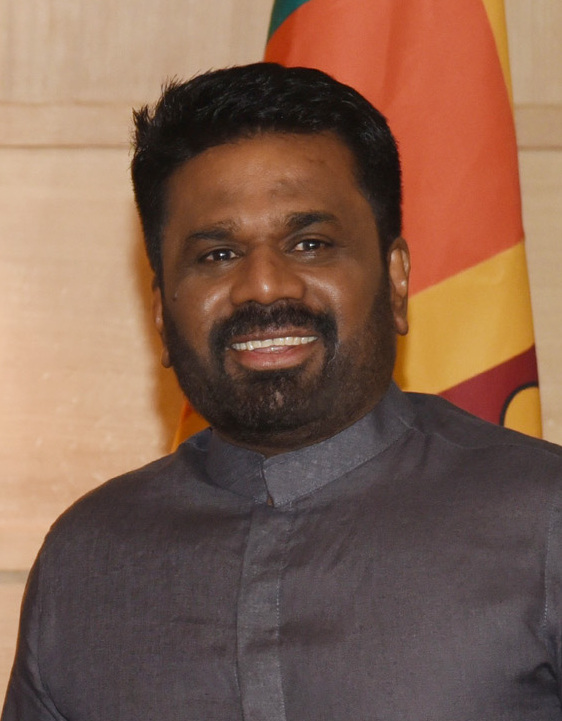

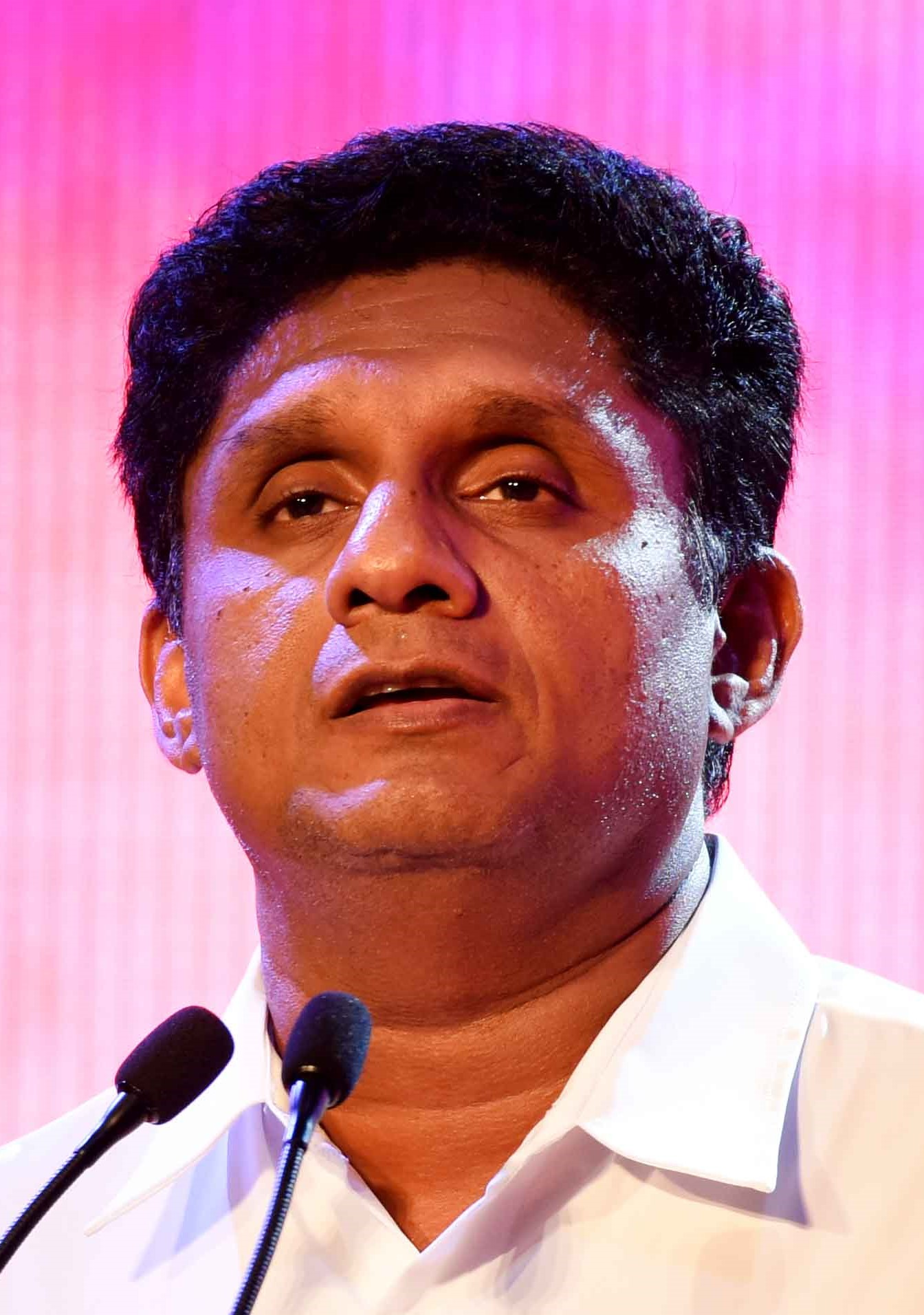

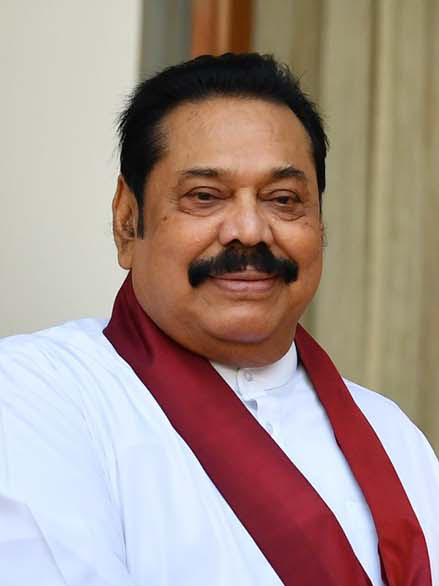
	First party	Second party	Third party
Leader	Anura Kumara Dissanayake	Sajith Premadasa	Mahinda Rajapaksa
Party	NPP	SJB	SLPP
Last election	2 seats, 5.8% (Note: Represents seats won by the Janatha Vimukthi Peramuna at the 2019 Elpitiya Pradeshiya Sabha election.)	New	17 seats, 56.3%
Seats won	15	6	3
Seat change	▲13	▲6	▼14
Popular vote	17,295	7,924	3,597
Percentage	47.64%	21.83%	9.91%
Swing	▲41.84 pp	▲21.83 pp	▼46.39 pp
Chairman before election
P. A. Karunasena
SLPP
Elected Chairman
K. T. N. Perera
NPP

Pradeshiya Sabha elections were held in Elpitiya on 26 October 2024 to elect 30 members to the Elpitiya Pradeshiya Sabha.

National People's Power (NPP) emerged as the largest party, winning 15 out of 30 seats and securing 47.64% of the vote share. On 8 November 2024, the Election Commission of Sri Lanka confirmed the appointments of NPP's Kolamba Thanthreege Nishantha Perera as chairman and Wagoda Pathirage Sumith Chandana as vice chairman of the Pradeshiya Sabha.

== Background ==
The 2019 Elpitiya Pradeshiya Sabha election, held on 11 October 2019, saw a high voter turnout of 78.86%, with the Sri Lanka Podujana Peramuna (SLPP) winning 56.31% of the vote (17 wards). The United National Front (UNF) followed with 24.37%, while the United People’s Freedom Alliance (UPFA) and Janatha Vimukthi Peramuna (JVP) received 12.71% and 5.87%, respectively.

Continuous political and administrative challenges were experienced by the council, with its term coming to an end on 6 March 2024. The council's budget was rejected four times, and a special commissioner was appointed under the Provincial Council Act.

On 12 September 2024, the Election Commission announced that the Elpitiya Pradeshiya Sabha election would take place on 26 October 2024. Nominations for the election were open from 9 to 12 September 2024, following the election deposit period, which commenced on 26 August and concluded on 11 September 2024.

== Contesting parties ==
A total of nine recognised political parties and two independent groups submitted nominations; however, only the nominations of eight political parties and one independent group were accepted. Thus, 279 candidates from these eight political parties and one independent group contested in the election.

Party Name	Symbol	Ideology	Seats won in 2019		Status
Party Name	Symbol	Ideology	Votes %	Seats	Status
Sri Lanka Podujana Peramuna		Sinhalese nationalism Right-wing populism	56.3%	17 / 29	Government
People's Alliance		Social democracy Sinhalese nationalism	12.7%	3 / 29 (Note: Represents seats won by the United People's Freedom Alliance at the 2019 Elpitiya Pradeshiya Sabha election.)	Government
National People's Power		Democratic socialism Left-wing populism Progressivism	5.8%	2 / 29	Opposition
Samagi Jana Balawegaya		Big tent Liberal conservatism Progressivism	—N/a	—N/a	New
People's United Freedom Alliance			—N/a	—N/a	New
Janasetha Peramuna			—N/a	—N/a	New
National People's Party		Neoliberalism; Liberal democracy	—N/a	—N/a	New
Devana Parapura		Communism; Marxism–Leninism; Socialism	—N/a	—N/a	New
Independent group	Television		—N/a	—N/a	New

== Results ==
Party	Votes	%	Seats			
Party	Votes	%	Ward	PR	Total	+/-
National People's Power	17,295	47.64	15	–	15	▲13
Samagi Jana Balawegaya	7,924	21.83	2	4	6	▲6
Sri Lanka Podujana Peramuna	3,597	9.91	–	3	3	▼14
People's Alliance	2,612	7.19	–	2	2	▼1
Independent group	2,568	7.07	–	2	2	▲2
People's United Freedom Alliance	1,350	3.72	–	1	1	▲1
National People's Party	521	1.44	–	1	1	▲1
Devana Parapura	388	1.07	–	–	–	–
Janasetha Peramuna	50	0.14	–	–	–	–
Total	36,305	100.00	17	13	30	▲1
Valid votes	36,305	98.59				
Invalid/blank votes	520	1.41				
Total votes	36,825	100.00				
Registered voters/turnout	55,643	66.18				
Source: Election Commission of Sri Lanka

=== By ward ===
Wards won by NPP
Wards won by SJB

Ward	NPP		SJB		SLPP		PA		IG		Others		Total				Turnout
Ward	Votes	%	Votes	%	Votes	%	Votes	%	Votes	%	Votes	%	Valid Votes	Rejected	Total Polled	Registered Electors	Turnout
Ambana-Kahadoowa	985	46.86%	244	11.61%	160	7.61%	154	7.33%	6	0.29%	553	26.31%	2102	42	2144	3133	68.43%
Amugoda	778	33.84%	404	17.57%	436	18.96%	551	23.97%	108	4.70%	22	0.96%	2299	29	2328	3265	71.3%
Awiththawa	618	29.88%	914	44.20%	89	4.30%	82	3.97%	354	17.12%	11	0.53%	2068	19	2087	3086	68.07%
Batuwanhena	1412	52.41%	438	16.26%	191	7.09%	182	6.76%	252	9.35%	219	8.13%	2694	45	2739	4475	61.21%
Ella	817	37.05%	625	28.34%	613	27.80%	113	5.12%	9	0.41%	28	1.27%	2205	40	2245	3360	66.82%
Elpitiya	1493	66.03%	384	16.98%	89	3.94%	21	0.93%	153	6.77%	121	5.35%	2261	39	2300	3604	63.82%
Indipalegoda	683	37.40%	310	16.98%	281	15.39%	41	2.25%	384	21.03%	127	6.96%	1826	31	1857	2620	70.88%
Ketandola	901	48.36%	320	17.18%	270	14.49%	82	4.40%	195	10.47%	95	5.10%	1863	35	1898	2800	67.79%
Kudagala-Kadirandola	1750	61.75%	478	16.87%	220	7.76%	130	4.59%	28	0.99%	228	8.05%	2834	29	2863	4658	61.46%
Metiviliya	421	30.01%	249	17.75%	48	3.42%	399	28.44%	228	16.25%	58	4.13%	1403	26	1429	2186	65.37%
Nawadagala	1084	48.33%	562	25.06%	105	4.68%	273	12.17%	69	3.08%	150	6.69%	2243	29	2272	3594	63.22%
Omaththa	1107	41.18%	202	7.51%	297	11.05%	295	10.97%	661	24.59%	126	4.69%	2688	40	2728	4244	64.28%
Pinikahana	1076	58.80%	352	19.23%	166	9.07%	57	3.11%	3	0.16%	176	9.62%	1830	31	1861	3043	61.16%
Pituwala	712	35.35%	1132	56.21%	29	1.44%	79	3.92%	12	0.60%	50	2.48%	2014	20	2034	2780	73.17%
Thalawa	1542	61.24%	574	22.80%	229	9.09%	99	3.93%	7	0.28%	67	2.66%	2518	27	2545	3894	65.36%
Thibbotuwawa	778	48.17%	428	26.50%	225	13.93%	17	1.05%	2	0.12%	165	10.22%	1615	20	1635	2385	68.55%
Wallabagala	1138	61.78%	308	16.72%	149	8.09%	37	2.01%	97	5.27%	113	6.13%	1842	18	1860	2536	73.24%
