= Sudarshana (name) =

Sudarshana is a Sinhalese given name and surname. Notable people with the name include:

- Sudarshana Denipitiya (fl. 2020), Sri Lankan politician
- Sudarshana Pathirana (born 1965), Sri Lankan Air Force officer
- Dhammika Sudarshana (born 1976), Sri Lankan cricketer
