= Denipitiya =

Denipitiya is a Sinhalese surname. Notable people with the surname include:

- Patrick Denipitiya (1934–2013), Sri Lankan musician
- Sudarshana Denipitiya (fl. from 2020), Sri Lankan politician
