= Devana Parapura =

Devana Parapura දෙවන පරපුර
- Leader: Uvindu Wijeweera
- Founded: 2022
- Headquarters: 83/20, First Lane, Seevali Kelanitissa Mawatha, Koholwila, Kelaniya
- Colors: Maroon; Yellow

Election symbol
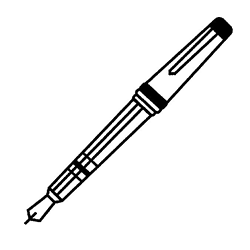

Website
- https://www.wijeweera.com

The Second Generation or Devana Parapura (Sinhala: දෙවන පරපුර, romanized: devana parapura) is a Sri Lankan political party. The party is led by Uvindu Wijeweera, son of Rohana Wijeweera, founder of the Janatha Vimukthi Peramuna.

== Electoral history ==
The Devana Parapura contested in their first elections in the 2024 Elpitiya Pradeshiya Sabha elections. They received only 388 votes, failing to secure a single seat. They contested the 2024 parliamentary elections and won 16,950 votes. Similarly, they contested for the Welivitiya-Divithura Pradeshiya Sabha in the Galle District in the 2025 local elections and received only 180 votes, failing to win any seats.
