= NPP Kottasha Sabha =

Sri Lankan political councils

NPP Kottasha Sabha (National People's Power Constituency Councils - Sinhala: කොට්ඨාශ සභාව) are political councils established by the National People's Power (NPP) in Sri Lanka at the constituency level. The NPP is a coalition formed in 2019 and led by Anura Kumara Dissanayake, who is also the leader of the Janatha Vimukthi Peramuna (JVP), a prominent socialist party in Sri Lanka. The NPP created Kottasha Sabhas to engage with and mobilize local communities across the country, promoting a platform focused on anti-corruption, social justice, and economic reform, as well as bridging ethnic and communal divides.

== Objectives ==
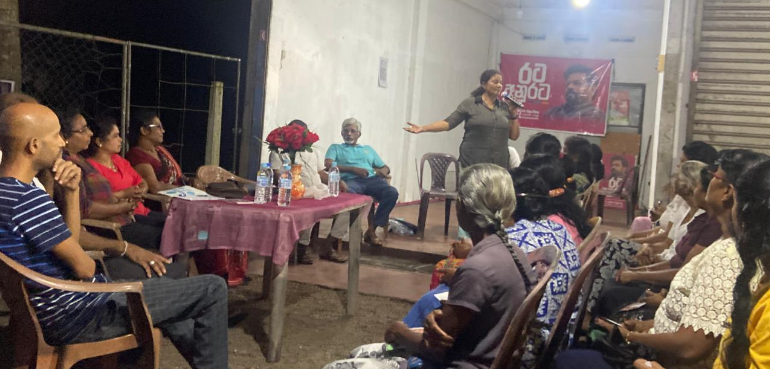
NPP Kottasha Sabha of Dewalapola

The NPP Kottasha Sabha serves several objectives:

- Grassroots Mobilization:
  The councils aim to mobilize citizens at the community level, particularly those disillusioned with Sri Lanka's traditional political landscape dominated by two main parties since independence. The structure allows the NPP to tap into localized support and connect with individuals who may have previously been aligned with other parties.
- Community Engagement:
  The councils focus on bringing together diverse groups, including activists, trade unions, and civil society representatives, to discuss local issues and propose solutions that align with the NPP's political platform.
- Electoral Strategy:
  Kottasha Sabhas are instrumental in expanding NPP’s political reach and in establishing a credible alternative to the mainstream parties. This strategy has been particularly relevant as Sri Lanka faces an economic crisis, which has prompted a call for change in political leadership.

== Organization ==
Each Kottasha Sabha is organized to function independently at the local level but within the broader goals set by the NPP leadership. These councils often include local activists, former supporters of mainstream parties, and new NPP members. The councils focus on local issues such as poverty alleviation, public health, education, and the empowerment of underrepresented groups. NPP has also established platforms within these councils for women and individuals with disabilities, reflecting the party's commitment to inclusivity and social equity. The Kottasha Sabhas provide forums for discussions, workshops, and public meetings to address both local and national issues. These councils also act as a channel for NPP to introduce its policies and to foster political education among the masses, enhancing grassroots understanding of national policies on economic reform and anti-corruption efforts.

== Impact ==
The establishment of Kottasha Sabhas has bolstered the NPP's appeal among voters frustrated by the existing political system, particularly amid Sri Lanka's economic hardships. These councils have played a crucial role in the NPP's strategy to present itself as a populist alternative, addressing systemic issues and advocating for a more equitable and transparent governance model. Additionally, the councils have provided the NPP with a decentralized network that strengthens its electoral campaigns, particularly in rural and economically marginalized areas

== Political role ==
The NPP emerged as a result of the anti-incumbency sentiment resulting from the Sri Lankan economic crisis. NPP established the Kottasha Sabhas to distance itself from the nationalist JVP initiatives and focus on anti-corruption, economic reform, and social justice, providing a new political channel for citizens to participate actively in governance and policy-making process at the local level.

== See also ==
- Workers' Councils and Advisory Committees in Sri Lanka
- Pradeshiya Sabha
- Organization of the Communist Party of the Soviet Union
- Organization of the Chinese Communist Party
