= 2024 Sri Lankan parliamentary election =

- 14 November 2024

All 225 seats in the Parliament of Sri Lanka 113 seats needed for a majority
- Registered: 17,140,354
- Turnout: 68.93% (▼6.96pp)
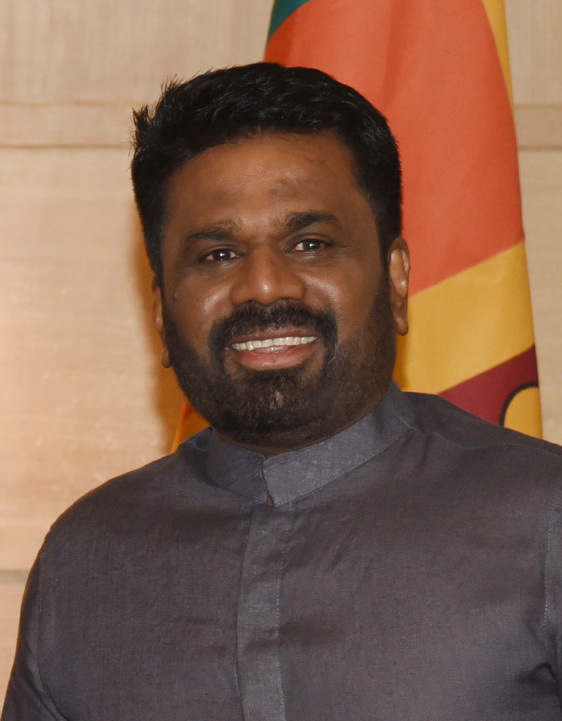

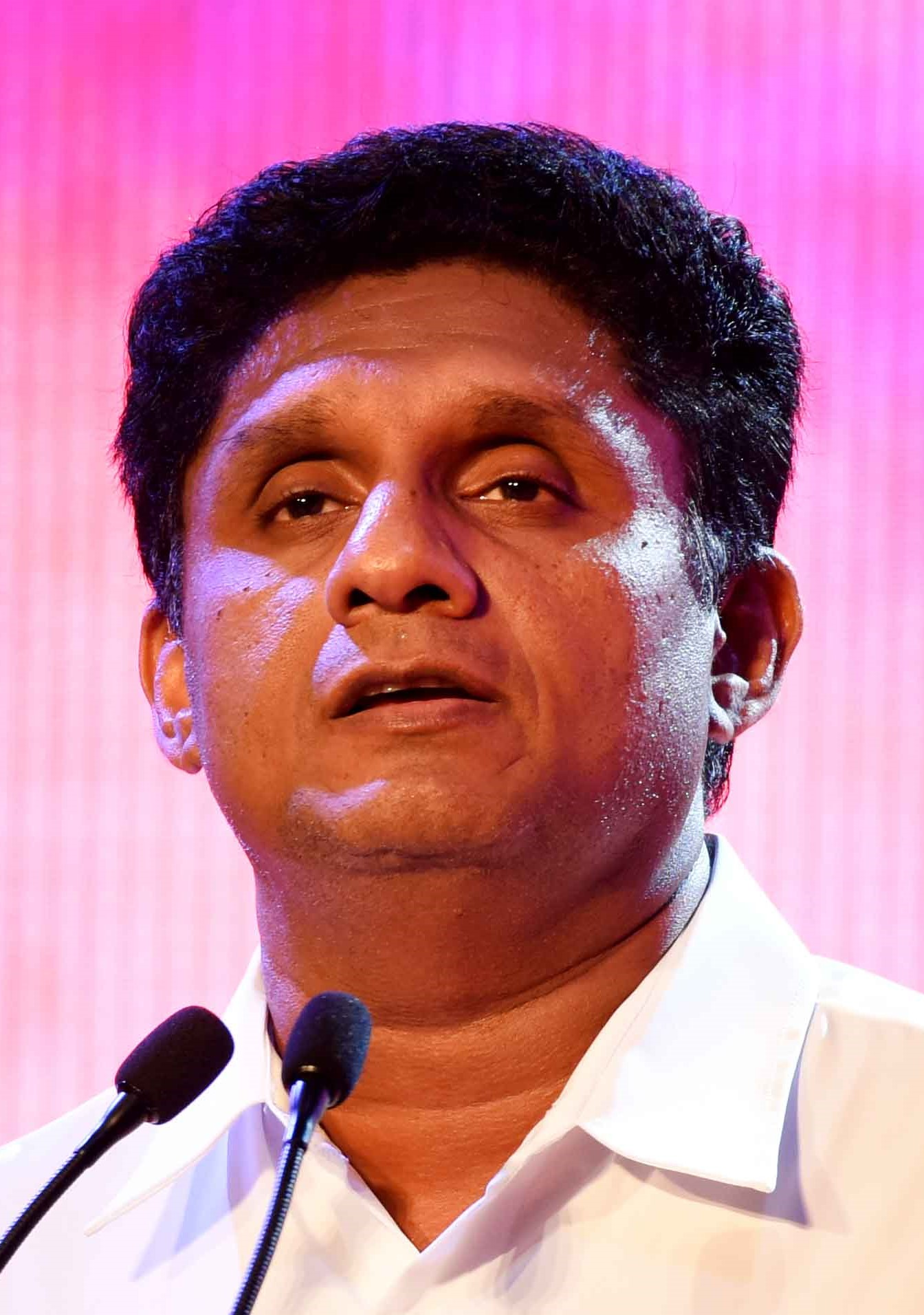

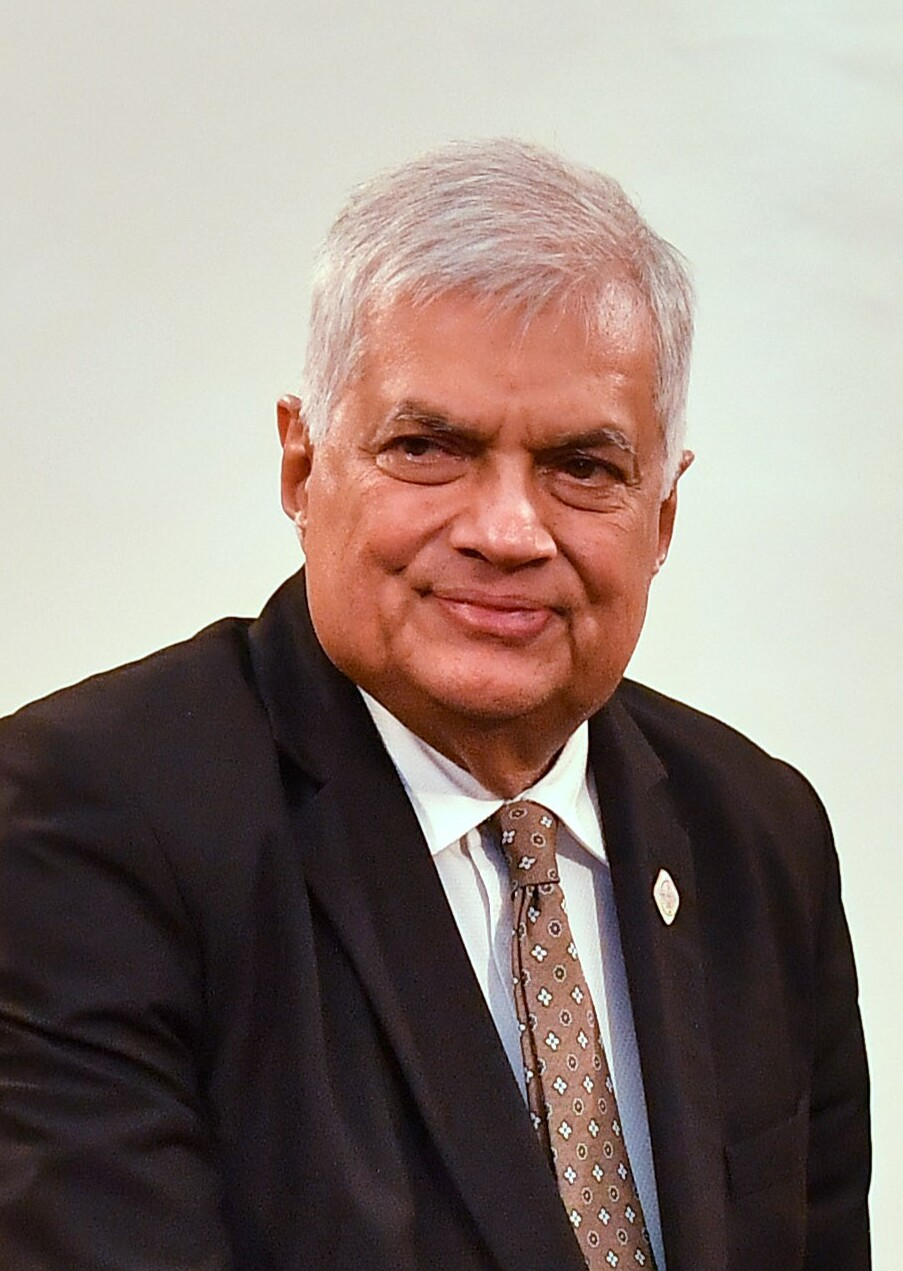

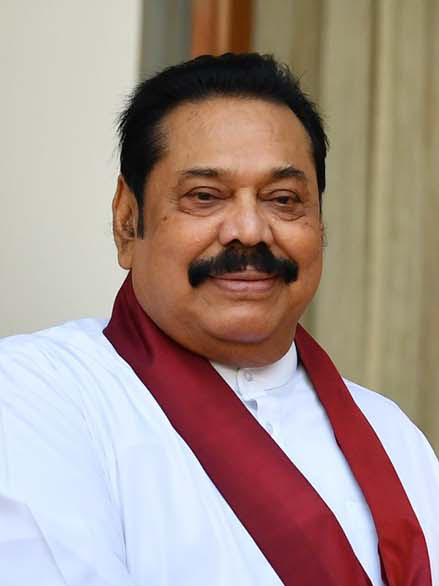
	First party	Second party	Third party
			ITAK
Leader	Anura Kumara Dissanayake	Sajith Premadasa	S. Shritharan
Party	NPP	SJB	ITAK
Last election	3.84%, 3 seats	23.90%, 54 seats	2.82%, 10 seats (Note: Represents seats won by the Tamil National Alliance (TNA) in 2020.)
Seats won	159	40	8
Seat change	▲156	▼14	▼2
Popular vote	6,863,186	1,968,716	257,813
Percentage	61.56%	17.66%	2.31%
Swing	▲57.72pp	▼6.24pp	▼0.51pp
	Fourth party	Fifth party
Leader	Ranil Wickremesinghe	Mahinda Rajapaksa
Party	NDF	SLPP
Last election	2.15%, 1 seat (Note: Represents seats won by the United National Party in 2020.)	59.09%, 145 seats (Note: Represents seats won by the Sri Lanka People's Freedom Alliance (SLPFA) in 2020.)
Seats won	5	3
Seat change	▲4	▼142
Popular vote	500,835	350,429
Percentage	4.49%	3.14%
Swing	▲2.34pp	▼55.95pp
Prime Minister before election
Harini Amarasuriya
NPP
Prime Minister after election
Harini Amarasuriya
NPP

Parliamentary elections were held in Sri Lanka on 14 November 2024 to elect 225 members to the new parliament. The 16th Parliament of Sri Lanka was dissolved on 24 September 2024. The submission of nominations for the election commenced on 4 October and concluded on 11 October 2024 at 12:00.

The result of the election was a landslide victory for the left-wing National People's Power coalition led by recently elected president Anura Kumara Dissanayake. The NPP won 159 seats, more than any Sri Lankan political party in history, the second highest proportion of seats in the nation's history, and won every district except Batticaloa. This was the first election since 1977 where a single party managed to achieve a supermajority and the first time the Jaffna District was won by a non-Tamil political party. This election also saw a record in women's representation with 21 female MPs elected, the highest in Sri Lanka's parliamentary history, and a record number of more than 150 MPs are first-timers.

Following the election, the newly elected 17th Parliament of Sri Lanka was inaugurated on 21 November 2024.

== Background ==
=== Political landscape before the election ===
The Sri Lanka People's Freedom Alliance (SLPFA), led by Mahinda Rajapaksa, won a large majority in the 2020 Sri Lankan parliamentary election on 5 August 2020. During their tenure, the government under President Gotabaya Rajapaksa and Prime Minister Mahinda Rajapaksa faced multiple crises, including the COVID-19 pandemic and an economic crisis, which culminated into widespread protests and the 2022 Sri Lankan political crisis.

These events led to both Gotabaya Rajapaksa fleeing the country and resigning as president, and Mahinda Rajapaksa also stepping down as prime minister. Ranil Wickremesinghe was first appointed as prime minister and later became the acting president following Gotabaya Rajapaksa's resignation. In a parliamentary vote on 20 July 2022, Wickremesinghe was elected as the 9th President of Sri Lanka, tasked with completing the remainder of Rajapaksa's term.

In the 2024 Sri Lankan presidential election held on 21 September 2024, Anura Kumara Dissanayake defeated his main rivals, Opposition Leader Sajith Premadasa and incumbent President Ranil Wickremesinghe, to become the 10th President of Sri Lanka.

As per the Parliamentary Elections Act, No. 1 of 1981, although the Sri Lankan parliament has a term of five years, the president can dissolve it after two years and six months from its first meeting or upon receiving a resolution from parliament. In spite of the 16th parliament's scheduled end in August 2025, President Dissanayake, exercising his constitutional powers and fulfilling an election pledge, dissolved parliament early on 24 September 2024.

== Timeline ==
Key dates
Date	Day	Event	Ref.
21 September 2024	Saturday	Anura Kumara Dissanayake is elected as president at the 2024 Sri Lankan presidential election.	
24 September 2024	Tuesday	President Dissanayake dissolved 16th parliament and called for a parliamentary election.	
4 October 2024	Friday	Nomination period commenced.	
10 October 2024	Thursday	Deadline to apply for a postal vote for eligible individuals.	
11 October 2024	Friday	Nomination period concluded at 12:00.	
30 October 2024	Wednesday	Postal voting commenced on 30 October 2024, continued on 1, 4, and 7 November, and concluded on 8 November 2024.	
11 November 2024	Monday	Election campaigning activities concluded at 24:00.	
14 November 2024	Thursday	Election day. Polling commenced at 07:00 and concluded at 16:00.	
21 November 2024	Thursday	First meeting of the 17th parliament at 10:00. Formal election of the Speaker. Swearing in of the elected members. Presentation of the government's policy statement by the President at 11:30.	

== Electoral system ==
The Parliament has 225 members elected for a five-year term. 196 members are elected from 22 multi-seat constituencies through an open list proportional representation system with a 5% electoral threshold; voters can rank up to three candidates on the party list they vote for. The other 29 seats are elected from a national list, with list members appointed by party secretaries and seats allocated according to the island-wide proportional vote the party obtains.

Every proclamation dissolving parliament must be published in The Sri Lanka Gazette and must specify the nomination period and the date of the election. The first meeting of the new parliament must occur within three months of the previous parliament's dissolution.

=== Recent changes in seat allocation ===
On 25 September 2024, the Election Commission released details regarding the number of members to be elected from each electoral district in the upcoming parliamentary election, the number of candidates to be listed on the nomination paper, and the deposit amount required from independent groups. Recognised political parties are exempt from making a deposit.

Registered electors and seat allocation changes: 2020 to 2024
Province	Electoral district	Registered electors		Number of allocated seats		
Province	Electoral district	2020	2024	2020	2024	Change (+/-)
Western	Colombo	1,709,209	1,765,351	19	18	▼1
Western	Gampaha	1,785,964	1,881,129	18	19	▲1
Western	Kalutara	972,319	1,024,244	10	11	▲1
Central	Kandy	1,129,100	1,191,399	12	12	Steady
Central	Matale	407,569	429,991	5	5	Steady
Central	Nuwara Eliya	577,717	605,292	8	8	Steady
Southern	Galle	867,709	903,163	9	9	Steady
Southern	Matara	659,587	686,175	7	7	Steady
Southern	Hambantota	493,192	520,940	7	7	Steady
Northern	Jaffna	571,848	593,187	7	6	▼1
Northern	Vanni	287,024	306,081	6	6	Steady
Eastern	Batticaloa	409,808	449,686	5	5	Steady
Eastern	Ampara	513,979	555,432	7	7	Steady
Eastern	Trincomalee	288,868	315,925	4	4	Steady
North Western	Kurunegala	1,348,787	1,417,226	15	15	Steady
North Western	Puttalam	614,374	663,673	8	8	Steady
North Central	Anuradhapura	693,634	741,862	9	9	Steady
North Central	Polonnaruwa	331,109	351,302	5	5	Steady
Uva	Badulla	668,166	705,772	9	9	Steady
Uva	Monaragala	372,155	399,166	6	6	Steady
Sabaragamuwa	Ratnapura	877,582	923,736	11	11	Steady
Sabaragamuwa	Kegalle	684,189	709,622	9	9	Steady
National List	—N/a	—N/a	—N/a	29	29	Steady
Total	—N/a	16,263,885	17,140,354	225	225	Steady

== Recent Sri Lankan election results ==
Election results
Dates of elections	Sri Lanka Podujana Peramuna (SLPFA)		Samagi Jana Balawegaya		National People's Power		Tamil National Alliance		United National Party		Others	
Dates of elections	Votes	%	Votes	%	Votes	%	Votes	%	Votes	%	Votes	%
2019 presidential election	6,924,255	52.25%	—N/a (Note: Did not exist)	—N/a	418,553	3.16%	—N/a (Note: Did not contest)	—N/a	5,564,239	41.99% (Note: New Democratic Front candidate led by the United National Party)	345,452	2.35%
2020 parliamentary election	6,853,690	59.09%	2,771,980	23.90%	445,958	3.84%	327,168	2.82%	249,435	2.15%	950,698	8.20%
2024 presidential election (Note: Without preferences)	342,781	2.57%	4,363,035	32.76%	5,634,915	42.31%	—N/a	—N/a	2,299,767	17.27%	407,473	3.06%

Sri Lankan political map prior to this election
2020 Sri Lankan parliamentary election	2024 Sri Lankan presidential election
Elected members of each electoral district or municipality, gaining the highest number of votes ■ SLPFA ■ SJB ■ TNA ■ SLFP ■ EPDP ■ Other parties

== Contesting parties ==
Abbr.	Name	Symbol	Ideology	Leader	Seats won in 2020		Seats before election	Status
Abbr.	Name	Symbol	Ideology	Leader	Votes (%)	Seats	Seats before election	Status
SLPP	Sri Lanka Podujana Peramuna ශ්‍රී ලංකා පොදුජන පෙරමුණ இலங்கை பொதுஜன முன்னணி		Sinhalese nationalism Right-wing populism	Mahinda Rajapaksa	59.09%	145 / 225	106 / 225	Government
SJB	Samagi Jana Balawegaya සමගි ජනබලවේගය ஐக்கிய மக்கள் சக்தி		Big tent Liberal conservatism Progressivism	Sajith Premadasa	23.90%	54 / 225	72 / 225	Opposition
ITAK	Ilankai Tamil Arasu Kachchi இலங்கைத் தமிழரசுக் கட்சி ඉලංගෙයි තමිළ් අරසු කච්චි		Tamil nationalism	S. Shritharan	2.82%	10 / 225	6 / 225	Opposition
DTNA	Democratic Tamil National Alliance ஜனநாயக தமிழ் தேசிய கூட்டணி දෙමළ ජාතික සන්ධානය		Tamil nationalism		—N/a	—N/a	4 / 225	Opposition
NPP	National People's Power ජාතික ජන බලවේගය தேசிய மக்கள் சக்தி		Democratic socialism Anti-imperialism; Left-wing populism	Anura Kumara Dissanayake	3.84%	3 / 225	3 / 225	Opposition
TNPF	Tamil National People's Front தமிழ் தேசியத்திற்கான மக்கள் முன்னணி ද්‍රවිඩ ජාතික ජනතා පෙරමුණ		Tamil nationalism	Gajendrakumar Ponnambalam	0.58%	2 / 225	2 / 225	Opposition
NDF	New Democratic Front නව ප්‍රජාතන්ත්‍රවාදී පෙරමුණ புதிய சனநாயக முன்னணி		Big tent Economic liberalism	Ranil Wickremesinghe	—N/a	—N/a	—N/a	New
SB	Sarvajana Balaya සර්වජන බලය சர்வஜன அதிகாரம்		Sinhalese nationalism	Dilith Jayaweera	—N/a	—N/a	—N/a	New

=== Total number of candidates contesting ===
In a media release on 12 October 2024, the Election Commission announced that a total of 8,821 candidates would contest the parliamentary election. Of these, 5,564 candidates represent registered political parties, while 3,257 are contesting as independents.

Chanu Nimesha of the Socialist Party of Sri Lanka made history as the first openly transgender candidate to contest in a general election in Sri Lanka.

=== Members of Parliament standing down ===
Number of MPs standing down by party affiliation
Party	MPs standing down	
Party	Elected (Note: Party affiliation of retiring MPs at the time of the 2020 election.)	Final
SLPP	45	33
SJB	7	10
ITAK	2	2
UNP	2	2
TPNA	1	1
SLMC	1	1
OPPP	1	1
NFF	0	4
SLFP	0	3
DLF	0	1
MEP	0	1
Total	59	

List of MPs not standing for re-election
MP	Seat	First elected	Party	Date announced
Ranil Wickremesinghe	National List	1977	United National Party	24 September 2024
Dhammika Perera	National List	– (2022)	Sri Lanka Podujana Peramuna	1 October 2024
Gunapala Rathnasekara	Kurunegala	2020	Samagi Jana Balawegaya	4 October 2024
Vasudeva Nanayakkara	Ratnapura	1970	Democratic Left Front	5 October 2024
Bandula Gunawardane	Colombo	1989	Sri Lanka Podujana Peramuna	5 October 2024
Chamal Rajapaksa	Hambantota	1989	Sri Lanka Podujana Peramuna	5 October 2024
John Seneviratne	Ratnapura	1989	Sri Lanka Podujana Peramuna	5 October 2024
Maithripala Sirisena	Polonnaruwa	1989	Sri Lanka Freedom Party	5 October 2024
Wijeyadasa Rajapakshe	Colombo	2004	Sri Lanka Freedom Party	5 October 2024
Sisira Jayakody	Gampaha	2015	Sri Lanka Podujana Peramuna	5 October 2024
Ali Sabry	National List	2020	Sri Lanka Podujana Peramuna	5 October 2024
C. V. Vigneswaran	Jaffna	2020	Tamil People's National Alliance	5 October 2024
Geetha Kumarasinghe	Galle	2015	Sri Lanka Podujana Peramuna	5 October 2024
Lakshman Kiriella	Kandy	1989	Samagi Jana Balawegaya	7 October 2024
A. H. M. Fowzie	Colombo	1994	Samagi Jana Balawegaya	7 October 2024
Wimal Weerawansa	Colombo	2000	Jathika Nidahas Peramuna	10 October 2024
Jayantha Samaraweera	Kalutara	2004	Jathika Nidahas Peramuna	10 October 2024
Shehan Semasinghe	Anuradhapura	2010	Sri Lanka Podujana Peramuna	10 October 2024
Champika Ranawaka	Colombo	2010 (2007)	Samagi Jana Balawegaya	10 October 2024
Nalaka Kottegoda	Matale	2020	Sri Lanka Podujana Peramuna	10 October 2024
Mahinda Rajapaksa	Kurunegala	1970	Sri Lanka Podujana Peramuna	11 October 2024
Basil Rajapaksa	National List	2010 (2007)	Sri Lanka Podujana Peramuna	11 October 2024
Kanaka Herath	Kegalle	2010	Sri Lanka Podujana Peramuna	11 October 2024
Prasanna Ranatunga	Gampaha	2015	Sri Lanka Podujana Peramuna	11 October 2024
Wimalaweera Dissanayake	Ampara	2015	Sri Lanka Podujana Peramuna	11 October 2024
Gamini Waleboda	Ratnapura	2020	Jathika Nidahas Peramuna	11 October 2024
Athuraliye Rathana Thero	National List	2004	Our Power of People's Party	11 October 2024
Yadamini Gunawardena	National List	2020	Mahajana Eksath Peramuna	11 October 2024
Sarath Fonseka	Gampaha	2010	Samagi Jana Balawegaya	12 October 2024
Ajith Mannapperuma	Gampaha	2015 (2013)	Samagi Jana Balawegaya	12 October 2024 (Note: Withdrew candidacy after submitting nominations.)
Keheliya Rambukwella	Kandy	2000	Sri Lanka Podujana Peramuna	13 October 2024
Mayantha Dissanayake	National List	2015	Samagi Jana Balawegaya	
Janaka Bandara Tennakoon	Matale	1994	Sri Lanka Podujana Peramuna	
Gevindu Kumaratunga	National List	2020	Sri Lanka Podujana Peramuna	
Uddika Premarathna	Anuradhapura	2020	Jathika Nidahas Peramuna	
Wajira Abeywardana	National List	1994	United National Party	
Nalaka Godahewa	Gampaha	2020	Samagi Jana Balawegaya	
Akila Ellawala	Ratnapura	2020	Sri Lanka Podujana Peramuna	
Pradeep Undugoda	Colombo	2020	Sri Lanka Podujana Peramuna	
Sudath Manjula	Kegalle	2020	Sri Lanka Podujana Peramuna	
Gayashan Nawananda	Monaragala	2020	Sri Lanka Podujana Peramuna	
Anupa Pasqual	Kalutara	2020	Sri Lanka Podujana Peramuna	
Jagath Pushpakumara	Monaragala	1994	Sri Lanka Freedom Party	
Lohan Ratwatte	Kandy	2010	Sri Lanka Podujana Peramuna	
Gunathilaka Rajapaksha	Kandy	2020	Sri Lanka Podujana Peramuna	
Sahan Pradeep Withana	Gampaha	2020	Sri Lanka Podujana Peramuna	
Piyankara Jayaratne	Puttalam	2020	Sri Lanka Podujana Peramuna	
D. B. Herath	Kurunegala	2020 (2019)	Sri Lanka Podujana Peramuna	
Seetha Arambepola	National List	2020	Sri Lanka Podujana Peramuna	
Niroshan Perera	Puttalam	2010	Samagi Jana Balawegaya	
Naseer Ahamed	Batticaloa	2020	Sri Lanka Muslim Congress	
Chaminda Sampath	Galle	2020	Sri Lanka Podujana Peramuna	
Vijitha Berugoda	Monaragala	2015	Sri Lanka Podujana Peramuna	
Sudarshana Denipitiya	Badulla	2020	Sri Lanka Podujana Peramuna	
S. B. Dissanayake	Nuwara Eliya	1994	Sri Lanka Podujana Peramuna	
Shan Wijayalal De Silva	Galle	2020	Samagi Jana Balawegaya	
Siripala Gamalath	Polonnaruwa	2004	Sri Lanka Podujana Peramuna	
Vino Noharathalingam	Vanni	2000	Ilankai Tamil Arasu Kachchi	
Charles Nirmalanathan	Vanni	2015	Ilankai Tamil Arasu Kachchi	

== Election campaign ==
=== Campaign finances ===
==== Candidate asset declaration ====
Under the Anti-Corruption Act, No. 9 of 2023, all election candidates are required to submit a Declaration of Assets and Liabilities to the Commissioner of Elections along with their nomination papers, covering assets and liabilities up to the date the election is announced. Candidates seeking national list nominations must also submit their declarations.

==== Expenditure cap and regulations ====
On 17 October 2024, the Election Commission issued a circular setting the maximum campaign spending limit for candidates in the 2024 General Election. This cap applies to candidates, political parties, independent groups, and national list candidates, and is determined by district.

These regulations are enforced under the Regulation of Election Expenditure Act, No. 3 of 2023. Parties must submit expenditure reports to the Election Commission within 21 days of the election results being declared.

=== Election campaigning activities ===
Election campaigning activities concluded at 24:00 on 11 November 2024. A silent period will be enforced until election day on 14 November 2024, during which all campaign activities are prohibited.

=== Election monitors ===
On 12 November 2024, the Election Commission announced that foreign election observers would participate in monitoring the upcoming election. These include representatives from South Asian countries, Russia, Thailand, and members of the Asian Network for Free Elections (ANFREL).

== Controversies ==
=== Rejection of nomination papers ===
YouTuber Ashen Senarathna announced his candidacy for the Sri Lankan Parliament, seeking to represent the Colombo electoral district as part of an independent group. On 11 October 2024, the Election Commission rejected his nomination, citing that it was submitted by an unauthorised individual, which led to disqualification. Senarathna plans to take legal action, claiming he was asked to wait outside while another candidate submitted the nomination.

=== Removal of name from the nomination list ===
Actress Damitha Abeyratne was expected to contest the general elections from the Ratnapura electoral district under the Samagi Jana Balawegaya (SJB) ticket. However, her name did not appear on the list of candidates submitted by the SJB to the District Secretariat. Hesha Withanage, the SJB leader for Ratnapura, stated that the decision to exclude her name was made by district members.

=== Withdrawal from contesting election ===
On 12 October 2024, former MP Ajith Mannapperuma withdrew from the parliamentary elections and resigned from Samagi Jana Balawegaya (SJB), a day after submitting his nomination for the Gampaha electoral district. He cited his removal as SJB chief organiser for the Gampaha electorate. He also expressed disappointment with party leader Sajith Premadasa and his leadership.

== Opinion polls ==

=== Institute for Health Policy ===
The following nationwide presidential poll was conducted by the Institute for Health Policy (IHP), an independent research institution.

The July 2022 poll lists the SJB and UNP as one party, as well as the SLPP and SLFP. All polls between January 2023 and August 2024 list the SJB and UNP separately, while the November 2024 poll lists the NDF rather than the UNP.

Date	Polling firm	SLPP	SJB	NPP	UNP/NDF	ITAK	Others	Lead	Margin of error	Sample size
November 2024	Institute for Health Policy	7%	26%	53%	9%	2%	3%	27	±5–7%	–
21 September 2024	2024 Sri Lankan presidential election									
August 2024	Institute for Health Policy	19%	29%	28%	9%	4%	11%	1	±1–3%	1,153
July 2024	Institute for Health Policy	13%	34%	32%	7%	5%	8%	2	±1–3%	1,198
June 2024	Institute for Health Policy	16%	38%	26%	7%	3%	9%	12	±4–5%	446
May 2024	Institute for Health Policy	13%	34%	34%	6%	4%	9%	Tie	±1–4%	503
April 2024	Institute for Health Policy	12%	34%	34%	5%	4%	11%	Tie	±1–4%	444
March 2024	Institute for Health Policy	8%	38%	35%	5%	5%	9%	3	±1–3%	506
February 2024	Institute for Health Policy	9%	30%	44%	4%	4%	9%	14	±1–3%	575
January 2024	Institute for Health Policy	8%	30%	40%	6%	4%	12%	10	±1.0–3.6%	506
December 2023	Institute for Health Policy	10%	27%	39%	6%	3%	15%	12	±2.0–3.5%	522
October 2023	Institute for Health Policy	5%	26%	40%	11%	4%	13%	14	±1–5%	567
September 2023	Institute for Health Policy	8%	22%	42%	13%	6%	6%	20	±1–3%	599
August 2023	Institute for Health Policy	11%	24%	30%	11%	6%	17%	6	±1–6%	556
July 2023	Institute for Health Policy	9%	24%	23%	8%	4%	33%	1	±1–3%	466
June 2023	Institute for Health Policy	9%	23%	23%	9%	5%	30%	Tie	±1–3%	506
May 2023	Institute for Health Policy	10%	26%	23%	13%	4%	23%	3	±1–5%	630
April 2023	Institute for Health Policy	6%	30%	32%	9%	4%	19%	2	±1–5%	580
March 2023	Institute for Health Policy	4%	30%	41%	6%	4%	15%	11	±2–5%	521
February 2023	Institute for Health Policy	4%	30%	43%	4%	4%	15%	13	±2–5%	421
January 2023	Institute for Health Policy	8%	31%	32%	9%	5%	15%	1	±2–3%	724
July 2022	Institute for Health Policy	18%	32%	42%	–	–	8%	10	–	–
2020 election	N/A	59.1%	23.9%	3.8%	2.2%	2.8%	8.2%	35.2	N/A	N/A

=== Seat projections ===
Date	Polling firm	SLPP	SJB	NPP	NDF	ITAK	Others	Lead	Margin of error	Sample size
November 2024	Numbers.lk	2	53	124	24	11	9	11	±5	870

== Voting ==
=== Postal voting ===
The Election Commission initially accepted postal voting applications from 1–8 October 2024, later extending the deadline to 24:00 on 10 October 2024. The postal voting facility is exclusively available to pre-approved officials involved in election duties.

Approved individuals began casting votes on 30 October 2024. The postal voting process adhered to the Election Commission's schedule, with voting continuing on 1, 4, and 7 November, and concluding on 8 November 2024.

=== Election day ===
Voting commenced at 07:00 on 14 November 2024 at 13,314 polling stations across the island and concluded at 16:00.

== Results ==
President Anura Kumara Dissanayake's National People's Power alliance won 159 of the 225 seats, securing a two-thirds majority in the Parliament. This surge in the NPP's seat count from three in the previous Parliament marks a shift in Sri Lankan politics. Reports suggest that Dissanayake's campaign focused on anti-corruption, social welfare, and economic revival amidst the country's economic crisis resonated with voters.

In the north and east, a decrease in support amongst Tamil and Muslim voters for traditional ethnic parties were given to be the reason for the NPP's success.

The main opposition alliance, Sajith Premadasa's Samagi Jana Balawegaya, won 40 seats, a decrease from the previous election. Former President Ranil Wickremesinghe's New Democratic Front secured 5 seats, while former President Mahinda Rajapaksa's Sri Lanka Podujana Peramuna collapsed from 145 seats in the previous election, winning 3 seats.

=== National ===
Party	Votes	%	Seats			
Party	Votes	%	District	National	Total	±
National People's Power (Note: Including the Janatha Vimukthi Peramuna.)	6,863,186	61.56	141	18	159	+156
Samagi Jana Balawegaya (Note: Alliance consisting of the All Ceylon Makkal Congress (which contested separately in one district, Ampara), the Freedom People's Congress, the Samagi Jana Balawegaya, the Sri Lanka Freedom Party (Dayasiri wing), the Sri Lanka Muslim Congress (which contested separately in two districts, Ampara and Batticaloa), and the Tamil Progressive Alliance (consisting of the National Union of Workers, the United Progressive Alliance, the Democratic People's Front and the Up-Country People's Front).)	1,968,716	17.66	35	5	40	−14
New Democratic Front (Note: Alliance consisting of the Ceylon Workers' Congress (which contested under the symbol of the United National Party in Nuwara Eliya), the Mahajana Eksath Peramuna, the National Unity Alliance, the National Congress, the New Lanka Freedom Party, the Sri Lanka Freedom Party (Nimal wing), the Sri Lanka Mahajana Pakshaya, the Sri Lanka Podujana Peramuna (pro-Ranil wing), and the United National Party.)	500,835	4.49	3	2	5	+5
Sri Lanka Podujana Peramuna	350,429	3.14	2	1	3	−97
Ilankai Tamil Arasu Kachchi	257,813	2.31	7	1	8	New
Sarvajana Balaya (Note: Alliance consisting of the Communist Party of Sri Lanka, the Independent MPs Forum, the Mawbima Janatha Pakshaya and the Pivithuru Hela Urumaya.)	178,006	1.60	0	1	1	+1
Sri Lanka Muslim Congress	87,038	0.78	2	1	3	+2
United Democratic Voice	83,488	0.75	0	0	0	New
United National Party	66,234	0.59	1	0	1	0
Democratic Tamil National Alliance (Note: Alliance consisting of the Eelam People's Revolutionary Liberation Front, the People's Liberation Organisation of Tamil Eelam and the Tamil Eelam Liberation Organization.)	65,382	0.59	1	0	1	New
Democratic Left Front	50,836	0.46	0	0	0	0
Democratic National Alliance	45,419	0.41	0	0	0	New
Tamil National People's Front (Note: The Tamil National People's Front contested under the name and symbol of the All Ceylon Tamil Congress.)	39,894	0.36	1	0	1	0
Tamil Makkal Viduthalai Pulikal	34,440	0.31	0	0	0	−1
All Ceylon Makkal Congress	33,911	0.30	1	0	1	0
People's Struggle Alliance (Note: Alliance consisting of the Frontline Socialist Party and the New Democratic Marxist–Leninist Party.)	29,611	0.27	0	0	0	0
Eelam People's Democratic Party	28,985	0.26	0	0	0	−2
Jaffna – Independent Group 17	30,637	0.27	1	0	1	+1
National Democratic Front	25,444	0.23	0	0	0	0
United National Alliance	22,548	0.20	0	0	0	New
Sri Lanka Labour Party	17,710	0.16	1	0	1	+1
Devana Parapura	16,950	0.15	0	0	0	New
Thamizh Makkal Koottani	13,295	0.12	0	0	0	New
Janasetha Peramuna	12,743	0.11	0	0	0	0
National Front for Good Governance	8,447	0.08	0	0	0	New
United National Freedom Front	7,796	0.07	0	0	0	New
Arunalu People's Front	7,666	0.07	0	0	0	New
New Independent Front	7,182	0.06	0	0	0	New
National People's Party	6,307	0.06	0	0	0	0
Our Power of People's Party	6,043	0.05	0	0	0	−1
Tamil United Liberation Front	5,061	0.05	0	0	0	0
Democratic United National Front	4,480	0.04	0	0	0	0
Samabima Party	4,449	0.04	0	0	0	New
Patriotic People's Power	3,985	0.04	0	0	0	New
Eros Democratic Front	2,865	0.03	0	0	0	New
Democratic Unity Alliance	2,198	0.02	0	0	0	0
Socialist Party of Sri Lanka	2,087	0.02	0	0	0	0
Jathika Sangwardhena Peramuna	1,920	0.02	0	0	0	0
United Socialist Party	1,838	0.02	0	0	0	0
Socialist Equality Party	864	0.01	0	0	0	0
Freedom People's Front	841	0.01	0	0	0	New
United Peace Alliance	822	0.01	0	0	0	0
Lanka Janatha Party	759	0.01	0	0	0	New
United Lanka People's Party	659	0.01	0	0	0	New
Liberal Democratic Party	635	0.01	0	0	0	New
New Lanka Freedom Party	601	0.01	0	0	0	New
Nava Sama Samaja Party	491	0.00	0	0	0	New
All Ceylon Tamil Mahasabha	450	0.00	0	0	0	0
Democratic Party	283	0.00	0	0	0	New
Sri Lanka Mahajana Pakshaya	269	0.00	0	0	0	New
Independents	245,458	2.20	0	0	0	0
Total	11,148,006	100.00	196	29	225	0
Valid votes	11,148,006	94.35				
Invalid/blank votes	667,240	5.65				
Total votes	11,815,246	100.00				
Registered voters/turnout	17,140,354	68.93				
Source: Election Commission of Sri Lanka

=== District ===
Districts won by NPP
Districts won by ITAK

District results for the 2024 Sri Lankan parliamentary election
Province	Electoral District	NPP			SJB			ITAK			NDF			SLPP			Others			Total			Turnout
Province	Electoral District	Votes	%	Seats	Votes	%	Seats	Votes	%	Seats	Votes	%	Seats	Votes	%	Seats	Votes	%	Seats	Total Polled	Registered Electors	Seats	Turnout
Western	Colombo	788,636	68.63%	14	208,249	18.12%	4	–	–	–	51,020	4.44%	–	34,880	3.04%	–	66,340	5.47%	–	1,211,738	1,765,351	18	68.64%
Western	Gampaha	898,759	72.76%	16	150,445	12.18%	3	–	–	–	47,512	3.85%	–	49,516	4.01%	–	89,080	7.20%	–	1,306,952	1,881,129	19	69.48%
Western	Kalutara	452,398	66.09%	8	128,932	18.84%	2	–	–	–	34,257	5.00%	1	27,072	3.96%	–	41,833	6.11%	–	721,461	1,024,244	11	70.44%
Central	Kandy	500,596	64.60%	9	145,939	18.83%	2	–	–	–	50,889	6.57%	1	15,762	2.03%	–	61,729	7.97%	–	61,012	1,191,399	12	70.16%
Central	Matale	181,678	66.16%	4	53,200	19.37%	1	–	–	–	13,353	4.86%	–	10,150	3.70%	–	16,220	5.91%	–	297,238	429,991	5	69.13%
Central	Nuwara Eliya	161,167	41.57%	5	101,589	26.21%	2	–	–	–	–	–	–	6,123	1.58%	–	118,686	30.64%	1	429,851	605,292	8	71.02%
Southern	Galle	406,428	68.07%	7	93,486	15.66%	1	–	–	–	30,453	5.10%	–	31,201	5.23%	1	35,523	8.94%	–	620,165	903,163	9	68.67%
Southern	Matara	317,541	69.83%	6	74,475	16.38%	1	–	–	–	31,009	6.82%	–	9,432	2.07%	–	22,277	4.90%	–	476,407	686,175	7	69.43%
Southern	Hambantota	234,083	66.38%	5	52,170	14.79%	1	–	–	–	18,297	5.19%	–	26,268	7.45%	1	17,039	6.19%	–	369,700	520,940	7	70.97%
Northern	Jaffna	80,830	24.85%	3	15,276	4.70%	–	63,327	19.47%	1	–	–	–	582	0.18%	–	165,297	50.80%	2	358,079	593,187	6	60.37%
Northern	Vanni	39,894	20.37%	2	32,232	16.45%	1	29,711	15.17%	1	–	–	–	805	0.41%	–	93,244	52.88%	2	211,140	306,081	6	68.98%
Eastern	Batticaloa	55,498	19.33%	1	22,570	7.86%	–	96,975	33.78%	3	559	0.19%	–	263	0.09%	–	111,188	38.75%	1	302,382	449,686	5	67.24%
Eastern	Ampara	146,313	40.32%	4	32,320	8.91%	–	33,632	9.27%	1	33,544	9.24%	–	6,654	1.83%	–	110,461	30.43%	2	380,523	555,432	7	68.51%
Eastern	Trincomalee	87,031	42.48%	2	53,058	25.90%	1	34,168	16.68%	1	9,387	4.58%	–	1,399	0.68%	–	19,845	9.68%	–	218,425	315,925	4	69.14%
North Western	Kurunegala	651,476	69.56%	12	189,394	20.22%	3	–	–	–	30,073	3.21%	–	35,236	3.76%	–	30,436	3.25%	–	978,927	1,417,226	15	69.07%
North Western	Puttalam	239,576	63.10%	6	65,679	17.30%	2	–	–	–	15,741	4.15%	–	14,624	3.85%	–	44,061	11.60%	–	410,853	663,673	8	61.91%
North Central	Anuradhapura	331,692	67.22%	7	98,176	19.90%	2	–	–	–	29,961	6.07%	–	11,248	2.28%	–	29,115	4.53%	–	522,533	741,862	9	70.44%
North Central	Polonnaruwa	159,010	68.67%	4	43,822	18.92%	1	–	–	–	5,153	2.23%	–	4,646	2.01%	–	19,928	8.17%	–	240,145	351,302	5	68.36%
Uva	Badulla	275,180	58.59%	6	102,958	21.92%	2	–	–	–	36,450	7.76%	1	11,255	2.40%	–	43,863	9.33%	–	503,724	705,772	9	71.37%
Uva	Monaragala	174,730	64.27%	5	62,014	22.81%	1	–	–	–	10,697	3.93%	–	11,624	4.28%	–	12,791	4.71%	–	12,991	399,166	6	71.36%
Sabaragamuwa	Ratnapura	368,229	61.75%	8	133,041	22.31%	3	–	–	–	26,171	4.39%	–	29,316	4.92%	–	39,613	6.63%	–	633,440	923,736	11	68.57%
Sabaragamuwa	Kegalle	312,441	64.80%	7	109,691	22.75%	2	–	–	–	26,309	5.46%	–	12,373	2.57%	–	21,337	4.42%	–	500,789	709,622	9	70.57%
National List		—N/a		18	—N/a		5	—N/a		1	—N/a		2	—N/a		1	—N/a		2	—N/a		29	—N/a
Total		6,863,186	61.56%	159	1,968,716	17.66%	40	257,813	2.31%	8	500,835	4.49%	5	350,429	3.14%	3	1,207,027	10.22%	10	11,815,246	17,140,354	225	68.93%

=== Seat changes ===
==== List of MPs who lost their seat ====
District	Incumbent			Held since
District	Party	Member	Offices held recently	Held since
Colombo	SLPP (Note: Originally elected for the Mahajana Eksath Peramuna, who were alliance with People's Alliance.)	Dinesh Gunawardena	15th Prime Minister of Sri Lanka (22 July 2022 – 23 September 2024)	2000
Colombo	Pivithuru Hela Urumaya	Udaya Gammanpila	Minister of Energy (12 August 2020 – 3 March 2022)	2015
Gampaha	SLPP (Note: Originally elected for the Sri Lanka Freedom Party, who were alliance with United People's Freedom Alliance.)	Prasanna Ranatunga	Minister of Urban Development and Housing (14 May 2022 – 23 September 2024)	2015
Kurunegala	SLPP (Note: Originally elected for the United National Party.)	Johnston Fernando	Minister of Highways (22 November 2019 – 18 April 2022)	2000
Matara	SLPP	Kanchana Wijesekera	Minister of Power and Energy (18 April 2022 – 23 September 2024)	2015

== Aftermath ==
President Dissanayake expressed thanks to voters for the NPP's showing, calling it a "renaissance". Having secured over a two-thirds majority in Parliament, the NPP now has the power to amend the Constitution of Sri Lanka, having made various promises to do so during the campaign.

== See also ==
- 2024 in politics
