= Workers' council =

Form of political and economic organization

A workers' council, also called a labour council, is a type of council in a workplace or a locality made up of workers or of temporary and instantly revocable delegates elected by the workers in a locality's workplaces. In such a system of political and economic organization, the workers themselves are able to exercise decision-making power. Furthermore, the workers within each council decide on what their agenda is and what their needs are. The council communist Anton Pannekoek described shop-committees and sectional assemblies as the basis for workers' management of the industrial system. A variation is a soldiers' council, where soldiers direct a mutiny. Workers and soldiers have also operated councils in conjunction (like the 1918 German Arbeiter- und Soldatenrat). Workers' councils may in turn elect delegates to central committees, such as the Congress of Soviets.

Supporters of workers' councils (such as council communists, Leninists and libertarian socialists or anarchists) argue that they are the most natural form of working-class organization, and believe that workers' councils are necessary for the organization of a proletarian revolution and the implementation of an anarchist or communist society.

The Paris Commune of 1871 became a model for how future workers' councils would be organised for revolution and socialist governance. Workers' councils have played a significant role in the communist revolutions of the 20th century. This was most notable in the lands of the Russian Empire (including Congress Poland and Latvia) in 1905, with the workers' councils (soviets) acting as labor committees which coordinated strike activities throughout the cities due to repression of trade unions. During the Revolutions of 1917–1923, councils of socialist workers were able to exercise political authority. In the workers' councils organized as part of the 1918 German revolution, factory organizations such as the General Workers' Union of Germany formed the basis for region-wide councils.

== In socialist theory ==
=== Background ===
Karl Marx in The Civil War in France described the Paris Commune as a system with indirect elections, where district assemblies elected delegates to a higher assembly and could recall them at any time.

=== Anarchism ===
Many anarchists advocate for social organisation through voluntary federations of communes with workers' councils and voluntary associations acting as the basic units as the basis for a stateless society. Early conceptions of this theory came from the writings of French anarchist philosopher Pierre-Joseph Proudhon. His theory of mutualism envisioned a society organised through workers' councils, cooperatives, and other types of workers' associations.

At the First International, followers of Proudhon and the collectivists led by Mikhail Bakunin endorsed the use of workers' councils both as a means for organising class struggle and for forming the structural basis of a future anarchist society. Writing for the French anarchist journal The New Times, Russian theorist Peter Kropotkin praised the workers of Russia for using this form of organisation during the Revolution of 1905.

Some modern anarchists, such as proponents of participatory economics, advocate for the use of workers' councils as a means for participatory urban planning as well as decentralised planning of the economy.

=== Lenin and the Russian Revolution ===
Marxist revolutionary Vladimir Lenin proposed that the dictatorship of the proletariat should come in the form of a soviet republic led by a revolutionary party with democratic centralism, which should seize state power and establish a socialist state based on soviet democracy. Lenin's model for the dictatorship of the proletariat is based on that of the Paris Commune, and is meant to fulfil the task of suppressing the bourgeoisie and other counter-revolutionary forces, and "wither away" after the counter-revolution is fully suppressed and as the state institutions begin to "lose their political character".

Some academics and socialists dispute the commitments Vladimir Lenin and Leon Trotsky had toward workers' councils after the Russian Revolution of 1917, noting that workers' councils "were never meant to become a permanent political form of self-governance" and were therefore sidelined by the Communist Party. Some socialists have argued this as an example of the Bolsheviks' betrayal of socialist principles, while others have defended it as necessary for the social conditions at the time to maintain and advance the Revolution.

=== Luxemburg ===
Polish-German Marxist revolutionary Rosa Luxemburg was a proponent of democratic control, including through councils but criticised Lenin and Trotsky for neglecting the "political training and education of the entire mass of the people" and making councils stand in for representative institutions of the whole population. Luxemburg's relevant theoretical works were mostly written during her time in prison between 1916 and November 1918, while her information about events in Russia was limited. Lenin described Luxemburg's views expressed in The Russian Revolution as mistaken but said she had "largely" corrected them by the end of 1918 and that "in spite of these mistakes, she was and is an eagle, and not only will she be dear to the memory of Communists in the whole world, but her biography and the complete edition of her works ... will be a very useful lesson in the education of many generations of Communists." Luxemburg was murdered in January 1919 and wrote no theoretical works dealing with democracy or councils in detail during the nine weeks between her release from prison and her death.

=== Council communism ===
Council communism advocates for a system of workers councils (council democracy) to coordinate class struggle, believing that workers' councils do away with the bureaucratic form of the state and instead give power directly to workers. Council communists view this organization of a revolutionary government as an anti-authoritarian approach to the dictatorship of the proletariat.

The council communists in the Communist Workers' Party of Germany advocated organizing "on the basis of places of work, not trades, and to establish a National Federation of Works Committees."

== Historical examples ==
=== Paris Commune ===
The Paris Commune of 1871 (La Commune de Paris) was a revolutionary government that seized control of the city of Paris, which governed the city for two months based on socialist principles through the combined efforts of social democrats, anarchists, Blanquists, and Jacobins. The commune was headed by the Commune Council (French: conseil de la Commune), which was composed of delegates who were each subject to immediate recall by their electors. The events of this period have been a significant influence on the development of Marxist and anarchist political theory and revolutionary praxis. Friedrich Engels named the Paris Commune as the first example of a dictatorship of the proletariat.

=== Strandza Commune ===
- Adrianople vilayet, Ottoman Empire in 1903

=== Russian Revolution of 1905 ===
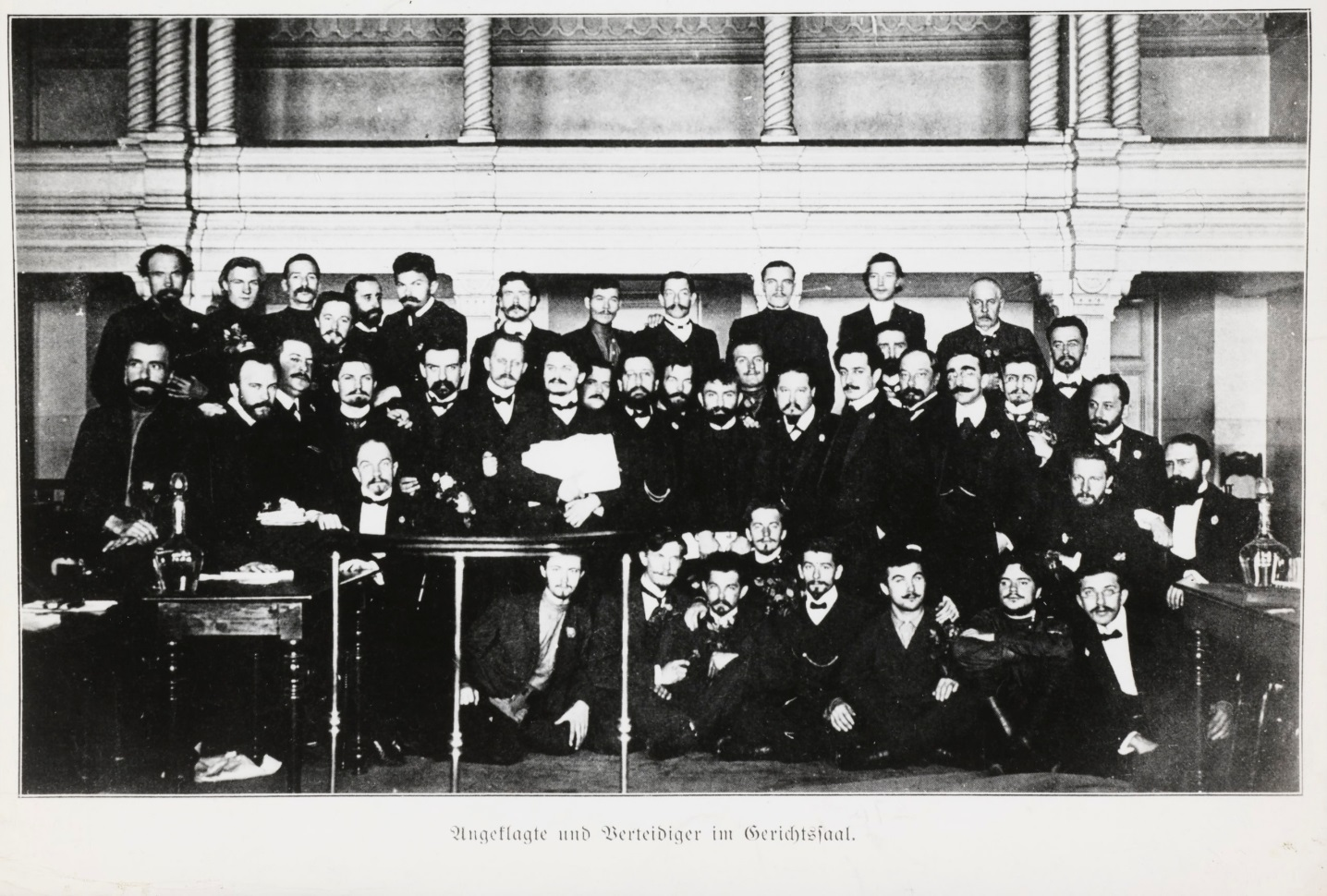
The Soviet of Workers' Deputies of St. Petersburg in 1905: Leon Trotsky in the center.

The Russian Revolution of 1905 saw the spontaneous emergence of workers' councils (otherwise known locally as soviets) in the Russian Empire. Trotsky would assume a central role in the 1905 revolution and serve as Chairman of the Petersburg Soviet of Workers' Delegates in which he wrote several proclamations urging for improved economic conditions, political rights and the use of strike action against the Tsarist regime on behalf of workers.

==== Revolution in Congress Poland ====
- Poland during 1905, (rady robotnicze);

=== Red Clydeside ===
- Glasgow, Scotland during 1915 (Rent Strikes)

=== Revolutions of 1917-1923 ===
==== 1917 Russian Revolution ====
Upon the outbreak of the February Revolution, mass meetings were held by ordinary workers, now some 10 percent of the population, to organize themselves in much the same vein as the revolution of 1905. Workplace assemblies were held in workplaces, peasant assemblies were held in villages, and soldier assemblies were formed among soldiers. These new assemblies were based upon the principle of direct democracy and served to organize the newly revolutionary masses.

Soviets were also created in the events of the February Revolution, which were made up of delegates and were the backbone of an alternative method of organizing society outside of the state. These soviets slowly took more and more power and directly threatened the power of the state and ruling class. workplaces would send some number of delegates to their soviet, based on how many workers worked in said workplace, and these delegates were recallable as well as mandated. By October, the number of soviets of all kind had reached 1500.

Unlike the soviets of 1905, political parties would grow in these new soviets, and end up dominating them. Slowly, the soviets stopped being attended by mandated delegates and instead came to be representative bodies instead, loyal to party doctrine instead the decisions of the workplaces that elected them. Party discipline soon came to be enforced, destroying the direct democracy that originally defined these soviets.

While the October Revolution undoubtedly helped accelerate this slow decay of direct democracy, the tendency of representative democracy replacing direct democracy had already sprung up months before.

On 30 May, the Menshevik minister of labor, Matvey Skobelev, pledged to not give the control of industry to the workers but instead to the state, saying that "The transfer of enterprises into the hands of the people will not at the present time assist the revolution [...] The regulation and control of industry is not a matter for a particular class. It is a task for the state. Upon the individual class, especially the working class, lies the responsibility for helping the state in its organizational work." Council communists, anarchists and other members of the left opposition criticize the Bolsheviks and menshieviks for superseding the soviet democracy formed by the councils and creating a bureaucratic system of what they referred to as state capitalism.

==== Makhno Movement, 1918-1921 ====
During the Russian Revolution, the Revolutionary Insurgent Army of Ukraine led by Nestor Makhno established a stateless territory in Eastern Ukraine on the principles of anarchist communism. The Makhnovists established a system of free soviets (vilni rady), which allowed workers, peasants, and militants to self-govern their communities through workers' self-management and send delegates to the Regional Congress of Peasants, Workers and Insurgents.

==== German Revolution, 1918-1919 ====
The German revolution of 1918–1919, also known as the November Revolution (German: Novemberrevolution), was an uprising started by workers and soldiers in the final days of World War I. It quickly and almost bloodlessly brought down the German Empire. In its more violent second stage, the supporters of a parliamentary republic were victorious over those who wanted a Soviet-style council republic. The defeat of the forces of the far left cleared the way for the establishment of the Weimar Republic. The key factors leading to the revolution were the extreme burdens suffered by the German people during the war, the economic and psychological impacts of the Empire's defeat, and the social tensions between the general populace and the aristocratic and bourgeois elite

==== Irish Revolutionary period ====
During the Irish War of Independence & Irish Civil War a number of worker's councils were set up for various degrees of time, between 1919 - 1923.

=== Spanish Revolution ===
Upon the breakout of the Spanish Civil War, the many areas of the republican side of the civil war became collectivized under workers' councils, mostly centered around Catalonia, the stronghold of the anarcho-syndicalist union Confederación Nacional del Trabajo, usually referred to as the CNT. These newly empowered councils started out extremely disorganized, but quickly organized themselves around the CNT.

Transportation, shipping, light and power companies, heavy machinery factories, food processing plants and breweries were all taken under the yolk of the workers' councils in major cities. The councils were marked by workplace self management. Representatives would be elected to carry out decisions made by a given council and were directly accountable to their council, and assemblies were held weekly to monthly. Almost all councils established schools, libraries and cultural centres. Many of said factories were also retooled for war production, owing to the lack of such factories in Catalonia before the civil war started.

The duties of representatives included organization, finance, correspondence, and relations with other councils. They also helped with the transfer of goods between rural and urban areas, by keeping records of imports and exports between regions, which allowed for synchronization between production and distribution within collectivized zones.

In rural areas, 2000 self managed rural workers' councils were created, expropriating some 15 million acres of land, which allowed for a greater degree of creativity in problem solving and improvements to production and management. Land was divided on the basis of technical expertise, in work teams of 10-15. This ensured city and frontline distribution of excess produce, let councils pool together resources to purchase expensive products and create welfare systems.

generally, small property holders were allowed to keep their private property, as long as they were not employing wage Labour. These private tracts of land were often harmful to efficiency, as they split up councils into disconnected parts. To induce movement in said small property owners, they were given land located on perimeters that were larger or of better quality.

In some areas, harvest increased to five times their pre-war levels. Most villages were able to improve the living standards of their members, and production increased in many locations, due to rapidly increased use of machinery, and by using previously unused land. Prices dropped because many middle-men, profiteers, wholesalers and small merchants were eliminated and many innovations were created to solve problems as they arose. many issues the workers' councils faced involved the war, which hampered many of the most radical changes the CNT proposed.

=== Post-independence Algeria ===
Algeria, in the aftermath of the Algerian War, oversaw the widespread practice of workers' self-management. This was subsequently suppressed by conservative forces in the country.

=== Indonesian War of Independence ===
- Indonesia during 1945–1946

=== 1956 Hungarian Revolution ===
- Hungary during 1956 (szovjetek)

=== China ===
==== Cultural Revolution ====
Workers', soldiers', peasants' and students' councils were formed and played significant roles in the Cultural Revolution. This included the formation of the Shanghai People's Commune in January 1967 which overthrew the state bureaucracy in Shanghai.

=== 1968 French protests ===
==== May '68 ====
During the May 1968 events in France, the Situationists, against the unions and the French Communist Party that were starting to side with the de Gaulle government to contain the revolt, called for the formation of workers' councils (comités d'entreprise) to take control of the cities, expelling union leaders and left-wing bureaucrats, in order to keep the power in the hands of the workers with direct democracy.

=== Solidarność riots, 1970 ===
- 1970, (rady robotnicze);

=== Sri Lanka ===
- Sri Lanka during the 1970–75 United Front government established Workers' Councils and Advisory Committees in Sri Lanka.

=== Australia ===
- Australia during 1971–1980 and 1990

=== Processo Revolucionário Em Curso ===
- Portugal during 1974–1976

=== 1979 Iranian Revolution ===
- Iran during 1978–1979 (shoras);

=== Solidarność Strike, 1980-1981 ===
- 1980–1981 (rady robotnicze);

=== Canada ===
- Canada during 1981

=== December 2001 Riots, Argentina ===
- 2001

=== Rojava Revolution ===
- Rojava from 2012 onward

== See also ==
- Dual power
- General assembly (Occupy movement)
- Grassroots
- Guild socialism
- Labor syndicate
- Libertarian municipalism
- Popular assembly
- Revolutionary socialism
- Syndicalism
- Zapatista territories
