= Thirteenth Amendment to the Constitution of Sri Lanka =

1987 constitutional amendment creating provincial councils

The Thirteenth Amendment to the Constitution of Sri Lanka (13A) is an amendment to the Constitution of Sri Lanka, passed in 1987, which created Provincial Councils in Sri Lanka.

This amendment also made Sinhalese and Tamil the official languages of the country and declared English the "link language".

== History ==
Historically since 1956, the Dominion of Ceylon passed the Sinhala Only Act which removed English as an official language and affirmed Sinhalese as the only official language in Ceylon. This led to protests from Tamils in Ceylon. On 29 July 1987, the Indo-Sri Lanka Accord was signed between Indian Prime Minister Rajiv Gandhi and Sri Lankan President J.R. Jayewardene which provided for the devolution of powers to the provinces. Hence on 14 November 1987 the Sri Lankan Parliament passed the 13th Amendment to the 1978 Constitution of Sri Lanka and the Provincial Councils Act No 42 of 1987 to establish provincial councils. The amendment aims at creating provincial councils in Sri Lanka and enable Sinhalese and Tamil as national languages while preserving English as the link language.

However, there have been practical problems in devolving land, the police and financial powers to the provinces and the Government has stressed that the structure that is implemented to achieve devolution should be acceptable to all parts of the country. Despite its attempts at political reconciliation, it has been viewed that it failed in societal reconciliation.

In February 2016, the Chief Minister of Sri Lanka's Northern Province, C.V. Wigneswaran sought India's direct intervention in the complete implementation of the amendment. In 2020, the Minister of Provincial Councils and Local Government, Sarath Weerasekara stated that he wanted to abolish the clauses of the Thirteenth Amendent regarding local councils. This was despite India making calls for the full implementation of the Amendment.

== See also ==
- Federalism in Sri Lanka
