= Chanu Nimesha =

Sri Lankan LGBTQ rights activist and politician

- Born: 1974 or 1975 (age 50–51); Galle, Southern Province, Sri Lanka
- Occupation: LGBTQ rights activist
- Political party: Socialist Party of Sri Lanka

Chanu Nimesha is a Sri Lankan LGBTQ rights activist and politician. She made history as the first transgender candidate to contest in a general election in Sri Lanka after she contested the 2024 parliamentary elections as a member of the Socialist Party of Sri Lanka.

== Personal life ==
Nimesha was born in Galle, in the Southern Province of Sri Lanka. Her father was killed in the 1987–1989 JVP insurrection. Her family members would eventually abandon her after refusing to recognize her transgender identity, forcing Nimesha to relocate to Colombo. In an exclusive interview with Reuters, she revealed that she had developed an interest in politics at a young age and she insisted that her bookcase had been predominantly occupied with socialist and leftist ideology books.

She raises funds for her activism-related works by serving as a quantity surveyor at a construction site close to her home. She is also an amateur actress and composes her own music. She is a writer and plans on publishing her own books in the future.

== Career ==
Nimesha is a vocal advocate for the LGBTQ+ community and has spearheaded various activities to increase public awareness of the community. In Sri Lanka, LGBTQ individuals are often viewed negatively, and LGBTQ-related stereotypes have often put individuals under vulnerability such as social rejection, public humiliation, and embarrassment.

Nimesha had collaborated with the Janatha Vimukthi Peramuna for a brief period but eventually parted ways with the party due to creative differences with its policies. In 2022, she took part in the Aragalaya protests against the government of then-incumbent president Gotabaya Rajapaksa. She coordinated a Pride March as part of the protests at Galle Face, and under her guidance, the first pride parade was held in Sri Lanka. She and many other LGBTQ activists joined the Aragalaya movement and installed a tent on Galle Face, protesting alongside other protesters with a focus on LGBTQ issues.

In 2024, Nimesha contested the parliamentary elections from the Kegalle District, representing the Socialist Party of Sri Lanka as one of the party's main candidates. Her campaign focused predominantly on tackling social justice issues. Although she was not elected, her campaign represented a significant step in transgender visibility in Sri Lanka.
