= Workers' Councils in Poland =

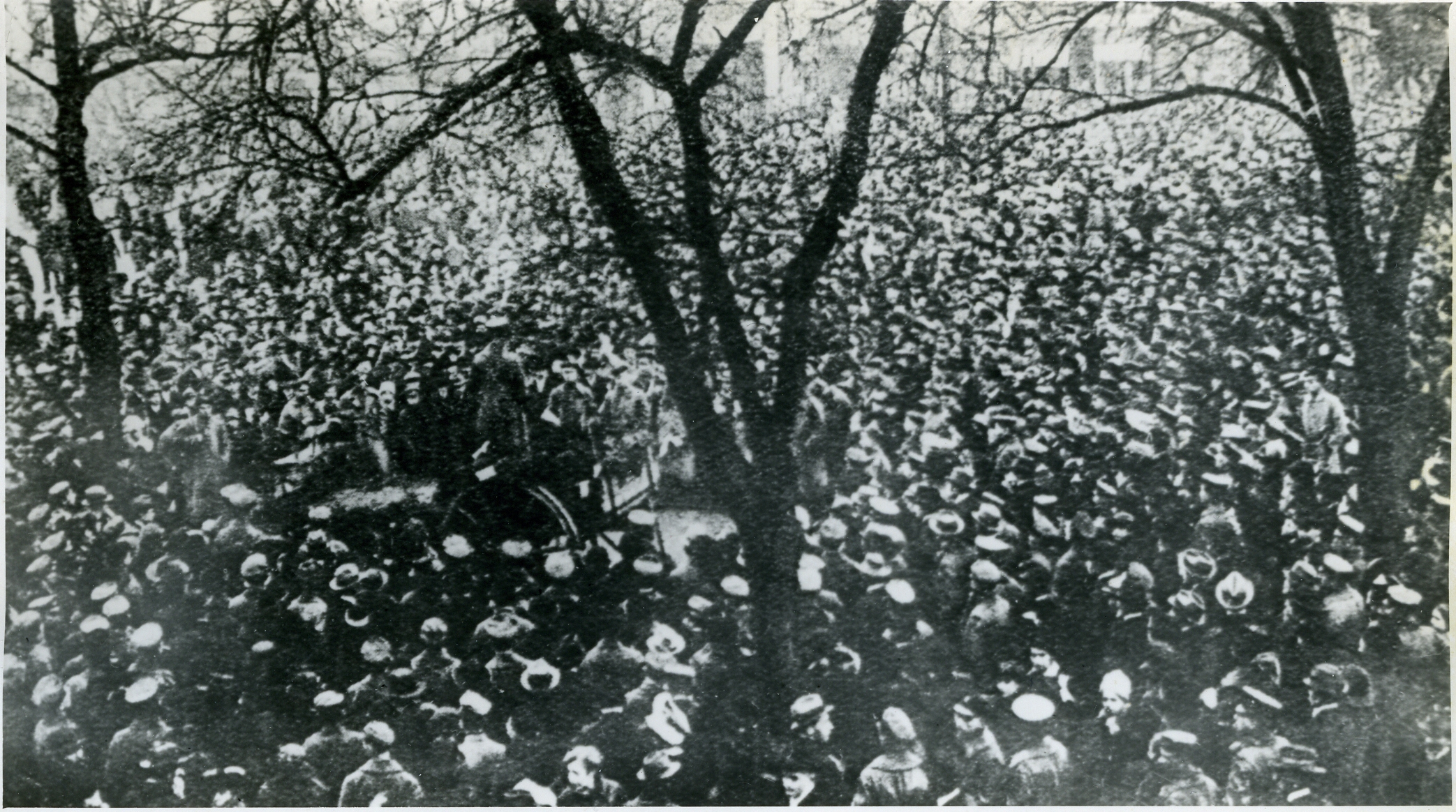
Polish soldiers and workers assembling to elect a council in Poznań, 10 November 1918

Workers' Councils in Poland (Polish: rady robotnicze w Polsce) or councils of workers' delegates (Polish: rady delegatów robotniczych) were representative organs of workers and peasants, set up at various times in Poland throughout the 20th century, but in greatest numbers towards the end of World War I on Polish territories.

== History ==
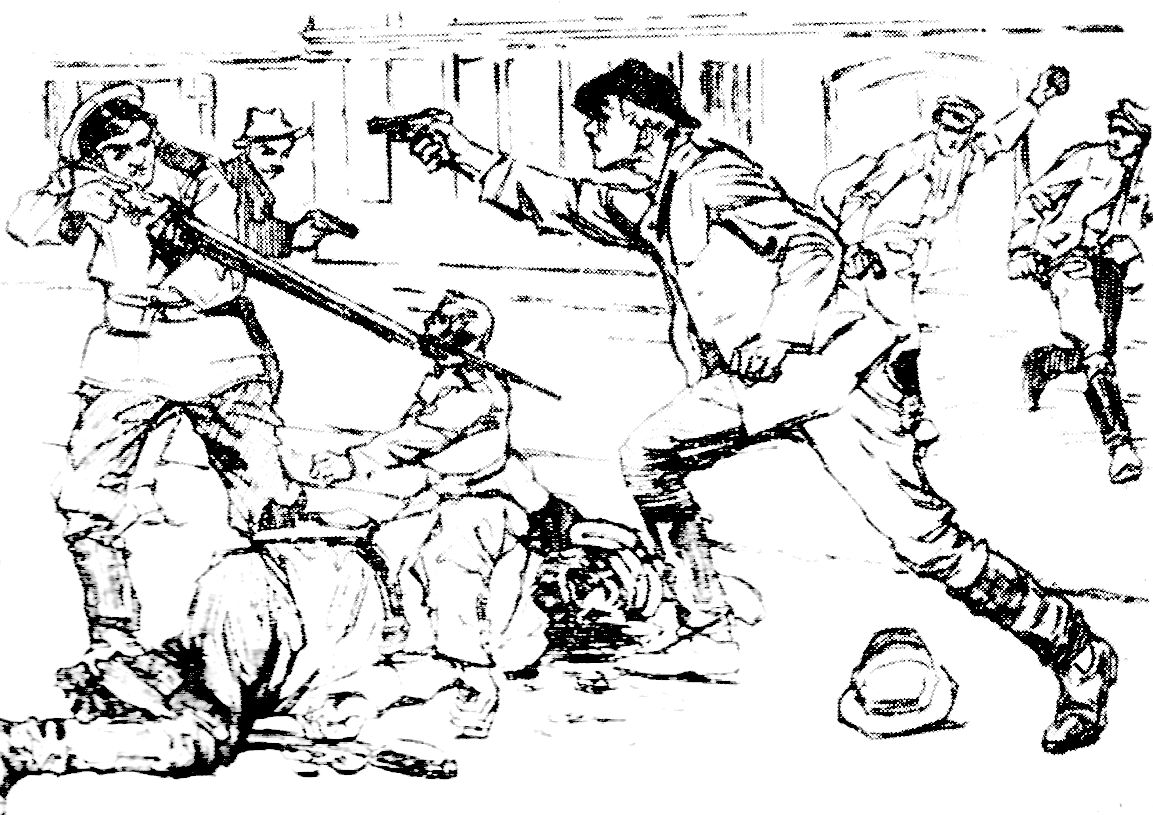
Drawing of the 1905 revolution from a 1908 issue of Robotnik

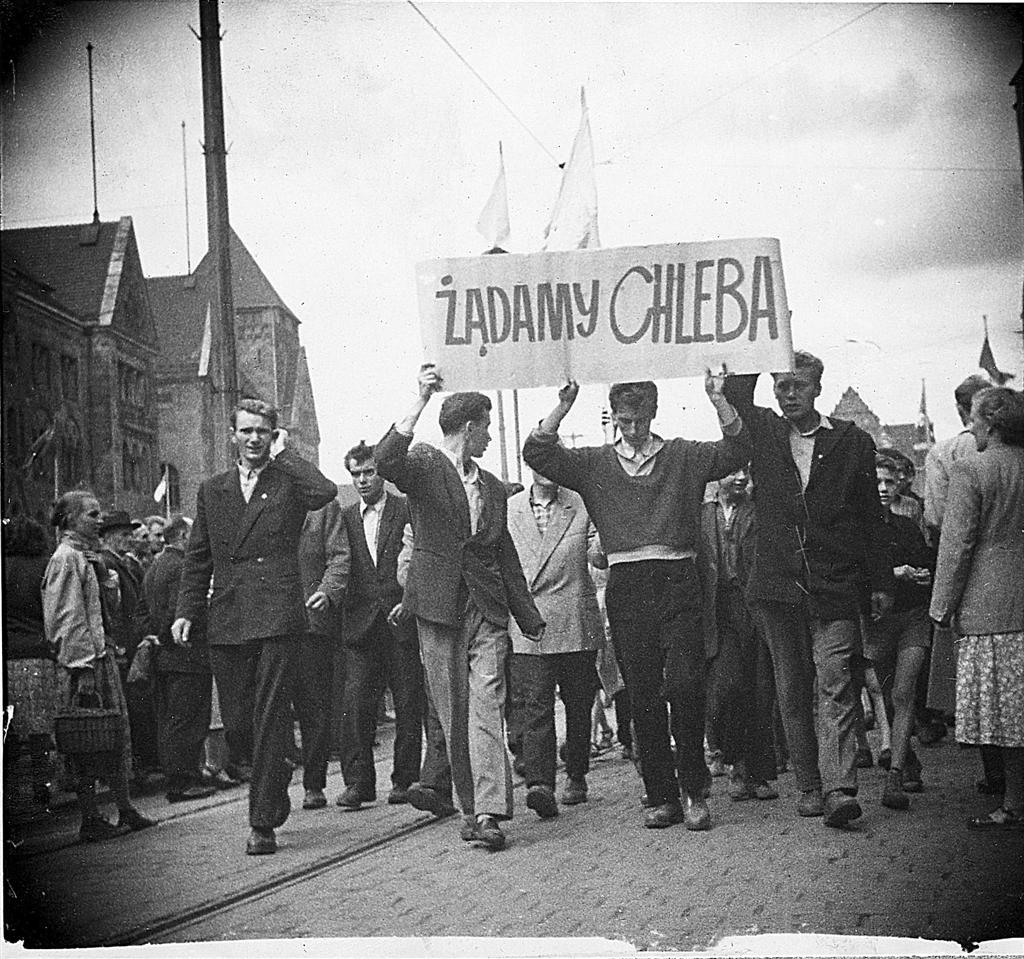
Poznań protests of 1956, workers hold a sign saying: "We demand bread!"

=== The 1905 Revolution ===
Workers' councils emerged as a form of direct working class self-organisation on lands of the Russian Empire, including Latvia and Congress Poland, during the Russian Revolution of 1905 (as well as its Polish element). In 1905, 93.2% of Congress Poland's industrial workers went on strike. The first phase of the revolution consisted primarily of mass strikes, rallies, demonstrations – later this evolved into street skirmishes with the police and army as well as bomb assassinations and robberies of transports carrying money to tsarist financial institutions. Congress Poland was one of the centres of revolutionary activity during this period.

=== 1918–1919 ===
In this period, most of the councils were formed in east-central Poland. Due to significant disputes over the political and economic future of the newly independent Poland, the councils failed to create an executive committee. Nevertheless, over 100 workers' councils operated in Poland in the years 1918–1919, assembling around 500,000 workers and peasants. The most numerous and radical councils were located in Kraśnik, Lublin, Płock, Warsaw, Zamość, and Zagłębie Dąbrowskie; some set up their own military self-defence units, the Red Guards. A short-lived Republic of Tarnobrzeg was proclaimed on 6 November 1918.

The main organisations behind the initiative were the Social Democracy of the Kingdom of Poland and Lithuania and the Polish Socialist Party – Left, which soon merged to form the Communist Workers Party of Poland. However, it was the Polish Socialist Party, formerly led by Józef Piłsudski, that was the dominant force in the Polish workers' councils. Other workers' organisations and parties competed for influence within the councils as well, such as the Bund in Poland and the National Workers' Union.

The councils were dismantled around July 1919, following the withdrawal of the Polish Socialist Party (which dominated the councils), and suppression by the Polish government, which saw the councils as a barrier to the formation of a Polish state.

=== After World War II ===
Apart from the 1905–1907 and 1918–1919 periods, workers' councils in Poland had also been set up in 1944–1947 in the aftermath of World War II and in the Polish People's Republic during the Poznań protests and Polish October of 1956. Strike committees and councils appeared during the strikes of 1980–1981 as well.

== See also ==
- Republic of Tarnobrzeg
- Dual power
- Russian Revolution
- Petrograd Soviet
- German workers' and soldiers' councils 1918–1919
- Soviet (council)
- Soviet democracy
