= Federalism in Sri Lanka =

Federalism has long been advocated as a means of resolving the ethnic issues and unbalanced development in Sri Lanka.

As the unitary state has resulted in uneven development across Sri Lanka, the Western Province dominates over the other eight provinces. Despite declining regional disparity, the Western Province continues to contribute the most to the gross domestic product (GDP), contributing 42%, while the second highest, the Southern Province, only represents 10.8% of the GDP. The Uva and Northern provinces represent the least with 5% and 3.6% respectively. Other provinces also have trouble attracting capital. This has resulted in calls for the abolishing of the unitary system and powers being devolved.

Further federalism has also been proposed as a solution the ethnic issues. The Tamil minority is underrepresented despite being the majority in the Northern Province. This also led to a civil war between the government and Tamil Nationalist militants. After the end of the war the Northern Province has shared the troubles of finding funds to rebuild damaged infrastructure. Provincial governments have been unable to finance the reconstruction of destroyed factories and damaged infrastructure to create employment. Federalism has been proposed as a method for sharing power.

Several heads of states such as S. W. R. D. Bandaranaike, J. R. Jayewardene, and Chandrika Kumaratunga have also accepted federalism as a solution to the island's issues, but did not implement a federal system. A watered down version was passed by the Sri Lankan Parliament as the Thirteenth Amendment to the Constitution of Sri Lanka, which albeit enables a form of federalism.

== Thirteenth Amendment to the Constitution of Sri Lanka ==
The Thirteenth Amendment (13A) was passed in 1987 as an addition to the Constitution of Sri Lanka following the signing of the Indo-Sri Lanka Accord. This amendment was introduced to address the Sri Lankan Civil War and the ethnic tensions between Sri Lankan Tamils and the Sinhalese population. Its aim is to introduce devolved governance by establishing Provincial Councils and to recognize both Sinhalese and Tamil as national languages while retaining English as the link language. Alongside this amendment, Parliament also passed the Provincial Councils Act (No. 42 of 1987) to formally establish the Provincial Councils.

Subjects such as education, health, agriculture, housing, land, and police were mandated to be devolved to the provincial administrations.

However, the amendment remains largely symbolic, as full implementation is still pending. Provisions related to police and land powers have never been implemented, and with regard to financial powers, the President retains authority to restrict or override provincial decisions, significantly limiting the autonomy of local bodies.

In February 2016, the Chief Minister of Sri Lanka's Northern Province, C.V. Wigneswaran, sought India's direct intervention to ensure the complete implementation of the amendment.

=== Opposition to the Thirteenth Amendment ===
From its inception, the Thirteenth Amendment faced significant opposition from certain political parties and groups in Sri Lanka, including the Janatha Vimukthi Peramuna (JVP) and factions within the Sri Lanka Freedom Party (SLFP). These groups argued that the amendment threatened Sri Lanka’s unitary state structure and could encourage separatist sentiments.

The JVP, in particular, has been vocal against any form of devolution that they believe compromises the country’s unity. They view the Provincial Council system as a step toward federalism, which they argue could lead to regional divisions and instability. The SLFP, historically a champion of Sinhalese nationalism, has also expressed concerns over the amendment, though its stance has varied over the years, especially depending on political alliances and leadership.

This opposition has contributed to the reluctance of successive governments to fully implement the amendment, particularly in devolving police and land powers. As a result, the amendment remains a contentious issue, with some viewing it as essential for ethnic reconciliation and others as a threat to national sovereignty.
