= Sri Lanka Podujana Peramuna =

Political party in Sri Lanka

Sri Lanka People's Front ශ්‍රී ලංකා පොදුජන පෙරමුණ இலங்கை பொதுஜன முன்னணி
- Abbreviation: SLPP
- Leader: Mahinda Rajapaksa
- Chairperson: Ven. Prof. Uthurawala Dhammarathana Thero
- General Secretary: Sagara Kariyawasam
- Founder: Basil Rajapaksa
- Founded: 1 November 2016 (9 years ago)
- Split from: Sri Lanka Freedom Party
- Preceded by: Sri Lanka National Front
- Headquarters: 1316 Nelum Mawatha, Jayanthipura, Battaramulla
- Youth wing: Sri Lanka People's Youth Front
- Ideology: National conservatism; Sinhalese Buddhist nationalism; Right-wing populism
- Political position: Right-wing
- National affiliation: Sri Lanka People's Freedom Alliance
- Colours: Maroon
- Slogan: අපි අපේ රට හදමු! ('Let's Build Our Country!')
- Parliament of Sri Lanka: 3 / 225
- Local Government Bodies: 0 / 341
- Local Government Members: 745 / 7,812

Election symbol
- Flower bud

Party flag

Website
- slpp.lk

The Sri Lanka Podujana Peramuna (SLPP; Sinhala: ශ්‍රී ලංකා පොදුජන පෙරමුණ, romanised: Śrī Laṃkā Podujana Peramuna; Tamil: இலங்கை பொதுஜன முன்னணி, romanised: Ilaṅkai Potujaṉa Muṉṉaṇi; lit. 'Sri Lanka People's Front') is a political party in Sri Lanka. It was the ruling party of Sri Lanka from 2019 to 2022 and was the largest party in parliament from 2020 to 2024. Previously a minor political party known as the Sri Lanka National Front and later the Our Sri Lanka Freedom Front, it was relaunched as the SLPP in 2016 as a base for members of the United People's Freedom Alliance loyal to its former leader Mahinda Rajapaksa and the Rajapaksa family.

The party was formed as a result of a split from the Sri Lanka Freedom Party (SLFP), a centre-left, Sinhalese nationalist, and post-colonial party. The SLPP borrowed some elements of the SLFP ideology but not its economic outlook, and is opposed to federalism in Sri Lanka. The party is led by Mahinda Rajapaksa, former president of Sri Lanka. Sagara Kariyawasam is the general secretary of the party. G. L. Peiris was formerly the chairman of the party before defecting to form the Freedom People's Congress.

== Background ==
=== Sri Lanka National Front ===
The Sri Lanka National Front (Sri Lanka Jathika Peramuna) contested the 2001 Sri Lankan parliamentary election in 15 of the 22 electoral districts across the country. The party failed to win a single seat in the Parliament of Sri Lanka after securing 719 votes (about 0.01% of all votes cast). The SLNF contested again in the 2004 Sri Lankan parliamentary election in 17 of the 22 electoral districts but once again failed to win any seats in parliament after securing 493 votes (0.01%). SLNF leader Wimal Geeganage contested the 2005 Sri Lankan presidential election and came in eighth after securing 6,639 votes (0.07%).

The SLNF contested the 2010 Sri Lankan parliamentary election in 19 of the 22 electoral districts but failed to win any seats in Parliament after securing 5,313 votes (0.07%) across the country. Geeganage contested in the 2015 Sri Lankan presidential election and came in last place, at 19th, after securing 1,826 votes (0.02%).

=== Our Sri Lanka Freedom Front ===
In 2015, the SLNF changed its name to Our Sri Lanka Freedom Front (Ape Sri Lanka Nidahas Peramuna) and its symbol from the cricket bat to a flower bud. In early 2016, OSLFF leader Geeganage hinted that a change in the party leadership was soon to come.

== History ==
=== Founding ===
In November 2016, the OSLFF relaunched itself as the Sri Lanka Podujana Peramuna, a political front for the Joint Opposition, and appointed G. L. Peiris, the country's former minister of foreign affairs and Rajapaksa ally, as its chairman. Attorney Sagara Kariyawasam, a former organiser of the Sri Lanka Freedom Party and attorney for former president Rajapaksa and his brother, former defence secretary Gotabaya Rajapaksa, was appointed as the party secretary. The flower bud remained as the symbol of the party. Basil Rajapaksa, another brother of Rajapaksa, joined the SLPP shortly after it was launched.

=== Electoral successes ===
In the 2018 Sri Lankan local elections, in a surprise result, the SLPP won a plurality of votes, winning 40.47% of all votes and securing the most councilors and local authorities; the party won 239 local government bodies including Municipals Councils, Urban Councils, and Pradeshiya Sabhas.

In the 2019 Sri Lankan presidential election, the Gotabaya Rajapaksa ran as the SLPP candidate and was backed by the SLFP. Rajapaksa won the election with 52.25% of the vote and was sworn in as the new president of Sri Lanka. In the 2020 Sri Lankan parliamentary election, the SLPP-led Sri Lanka People's Freedom Alliance won a landslide victory and a clear majority in the parliament, winning 145 seats in Parliament. Five members of the Rajapaksa family won seats in the parliament, and former president Mahinda Rajapaksa was sworn in as the new prime minister of Sri Lanka.

=== Economic crisis ===
The Rajapaksa administration introduced massive tax cuts in late 2019, which lead to a drop in government revenue that was soon compounded with the onset of the COVID-19 pandemic, which saw the island nation losing its lucrative US$3 billion tourism industry that put 200,000 out of work in 2020 and most of 2021. Although the export sector picked up by 2021 and tourism started picking up, it appeared that Sri Lanka was facing its most severe economic crisis since its independence in 1948 due to the loss of revenue from tax cuts, rampant money printing and unsustainable borrowings. By end of 2021, Sri Lanka was facing a debt crisis with a possibility of sovereign default. According to a poll conducted by Verité Research in March 2022, the government's approval rating had fallen to just 10% as a result of the crisis.

Following severe shortages of fuel, the state-owned Ceylon Electricity Board was forced to implement 10–13 hour power cuts across the island in late March. The SLPP government began to grow increasingly unpopular. This triggered the 2022 Sri Lankan protests, which demanded the resignation of Gotabaya Rajapaksa and other key officials from the Rajapaksa family. On 3 April, several ministers in the second Gotabaya Rajapaksa cabinet submitted their resignations. This included three ministers from the Rajapaksa family: Chamal Rajapaksa, Basil Rajapaksa, and Namal Rajapaksa. The president was to announce the new cabinet the following day. On 18 April, Rajapaksa appointed 17 new cabinet members, selected among his party members. This move was seen as a sign of Rajapaksa's lack of willingness to listen and adhere to the protesters' demands.

On 9 May, Mahinda Rajapaksa tendered his resignation as prime minister to the president. Rajapaksa was heavily criticised by netizens and the public for resigning after instigating violence against peaceful protests. Ranil Wickremesinghe was sworn in as the new prime minister on 12 May. Eventually, protests peaked on 9 July, after large numbers of protesters gathered at Chatham Street, near the President's House, Colombo, demanding his immediate resignation. Protesters also broke into the Presidential Secretariat and Temple Trees, the prime minister's official residence, and gathered around the private residence at 115 Fifth Lane of Wickremesinghe. Speaker of the parliament Mahinda Yapa Abeywardena issued a statement that night that Rajapaksa would resign from office on 13 July. Political parties including the country's opposition agreed to form an all-party interim government after the president's resignation. Wickremesinghe also announced that he would be willing to resign as prime minister, saying that he would do so once a new government was formed.

==== Self-exile and resignation of Gotabaya Rajapaksa ====
On the morning of 13 July, Rajapaksa fled Sri Lanka and appointed Wickremesinghe as acting president in his absence. Rajapaksa emailed a letter of resignation to the speaker of the parliament on 14 July the next day, thus marking the end of Rajapaksa's presidency. The news of his resignation was celebrated by the public mainly at Galle Face and also in the other parts of Colombo. On 15 July, parliamentary speaker Mahinda Yapa Abewardhana announced the official resignation of Rajapaksa. Wickremesinghe was officially sworn in as the acting president, and was later elected in the 2022 Sri Lankan presidential election by the Parliament of Sri Lanka to complete the remainder of Rajapaksa's term.

During the 2022 Sri Lankan presidential election, Dinesh Gunawardena temporarily succeeded Mahinda Rajapaksa as the de facto leader of the SLPP. Gunawardena would later become Prime Minister of Sri Lanka on 22 July 2022. On 15 December 2023, the National Convention of the SLPP was held, in which Mahinda Rajapaksa was reappointed as the party leader.

=== 2024 presidential election ===
In 2024, there was much speculation whether the SLPP would field its own candidate or endorse incumbent president Ranil Wickremesinghe at the 2024 presidential election. In late July 2024, the SLPP announced that it would not endorse Wickremesinghe in the election. On 7 August 2024, the SLPP announced Namal Rajapaksa, son of Mahinda Rajapaksa, as its candidate in the 2024 presidential election. He was the youngest candidate in the election. Rajapaksa was eliminated after the first vote count, placing 4th behind Anura Kumara Dissanayake, Sajith Premadasa and Ranil Wickremesinghe and winning only 2.57% of the popular vote.

=== 2024 parliamentary election ===
In the 2024 parliamentary election, the SLPP, which had previously been the largest party in parliament, collapsed to just 3 seats, winning only 3.14% of the popular vote and becoming the 5th largest party in parliament.

== Ideology ==
The SLPP split from the Sri Lanka Freedom Party (SLFP), a centre-left, Sinhalese nationalist, and post-colonial party, which political scientist Jayadeva Uyangoda described as "a progressive, social democratic, centre-left political party, that made tremendous contribution to social change and democracy". The SLPP borrowed the elements of nationalism from the SLFP but not its economic outlook. The party is opposed to federalism in Sri Lanka.

In 2019, the SLPP began to outperform the SLFP, which did not field a candidate in the 2019 presidential election. The split and rightward turn of the SLPP, which moved towards neo-nationalism and right-wing populism, corresponded with the shifts of the nation's two other major parties: Anura Kumara Dissanayake's leftist Janatha Vimukthi Peramuna moved closer to social democracy and democratic socialism, while Sajith Premadasa's free-market oriented United National Party (and later the Samagi Jana Balawegaya) became more supportive of welfare. Uyangoda described the SLPP as "a right wing, neo-conservative party that favours authoritarianism", and commented: "Though ironically created by the SLFP, the SLPP doesn't replace it, it merely displaces it. The SLPP will undoubtedly tread a free market-oriented path but have Mahinda Rajapaksa to disguise its policy in state-capitalist rhetoric." Ahead of the 2019 elections, Deshika Elapata, a junior researcher of the European Institute for Asian Studies, described the SLPP as "a socially right-wing and economically left-wing party rooted in Sinhalese nationalism and social democracy".

== Electoral history ==
=== Presidential ===
Election year	Candidate	Votes	%	Result
2005	Wimal Geeganage	6,639	0.07%	Lost
2015	Wimal Geeganage	1,826	0.02%	Lost
2019	Gotabaya Rajapaksa	6,924,255	52.25%	Won
2022 (Note: This was an indirect election. During this election, one faction of the SLPP supported Wickremesinghe from the UNP, while the other faction supported Alahapperuma from the SLPP.)	Supported Ranil Wickremesinghe	134 (E.V)	61.19%	Won
2022	Dullas Alahapperuma	82 (E.V)	37.44%	Lost
2024	Namal Rajapaksa	342,781	2.57%	Lost

=== Parliamentary ===
Election year	Votes	Vote %	Seats won	+/–	Leader	Result for the party
2001	719	0.01%	0 / 225	New	Wimal Geeganage	Extra-parliamentary
2004	493	0.01%	0 / 225	Steady	Wimal Geeganage	Extra-parliamentary
2010	5,313	0.07%	0 / 225	Steady	Wimal Geeganage	Extra-parliamentary
2020	6,853,690	59.09%	145 / 225 (Note: Total number of seats won by SLPFA, SLPP alone won 100 seats)	▲145	Mahinda Rajapaksa	Government
2024	350,429	3.14%	3 / 225	▼142	Mahinda Rajapaksa	Opposition

=== Local ===
Election year	Votes	Vote %	Councillors	+/–	Local Authorities	+/–	Leader
2018	5,006,837	40.47%	3,436 / 8,327	New	231 / 341	New	Mahinda Rajapaksa
2019 (Elpitiya)	23,372	56.3%	17 / 29	New	1 / 1	New	Mahinda Rajapaksa
2024 (Elpitiya)	3,597	9.91%	3 / 30	▼14	0 / 1	▼1	Mahinda Rajapaksa
2025	954,517	9.17%	742 / 7,812	▼2,694	3 / 341	▼739	Mahinda Rajapaksa

== SLPP Presidents ==
There has been only 1 president from the Sri Lanka Podujana Peramuna.

#	Portrait	President (birth–death)	Home Province	Took office	Left office	Tenure	Prime Minister (Term)
1		Gotabaya Rajapaksa (b. 1949)	Southern	18 November 2019	14 July 2022	2 years, 238 days	Mahinda Rajapaksa (2019–2022)
1		Gotabaya Rajapaksa (b. 1949)	Southern	18 November 2019	14 July 2022	2 years, 238 days	Ranil Wickremesinghe (2022)

== See also ==
- 2018 Sri Lankan constitutional crisis
- 2022 Sri Lankan political crisis
- 2022 Sri Lankan protests
- Rajapaksa family
