= Workers' Councils and Advisory Committees in Sri Lanka =

Workers' Councils and Advisory Committees' also known as Peoples' Committees (ජනතා කමිටු) were ad hoc committees established by the United Front (UF) government in Sri Lanka between 1970 and 1975. Based on the Workers' Councils in Yugoslavia, the Lanka Sama Samaja Party (LSSP) proposed the formation of Workers' Councils as far back as 1951. This was included in the manifesto of the coalition between the LSSP and the Sri Lanka Freedom Party (SLFP) and was rejected in the 1965 Ceylonese parliamentary election. Following the victory of the United Front in the 1970 Ceylonese parliamentary election, the new government began setting up Workers' Councils, Advisory Committees, and Peoples' Committees to transform the administration to work closely with the people. The Cabinet of Ministers approved the framework of Workers' Councils under the Public Administration Circular, No. 8 of 15 August 1970, establishing Workers' Councils in several public corporations on the instructions of the respective Ministers. Advisory Committees were established in government departments. As per the Circular, these Councils and Committees had powers to "draw attention to acts of neglect of duty, undue delay, wastage of public funds; advise on measures designed to improve efficiency and effectiveness, to effect economies in running the institutions; and ask for and obtain information from management on all matters". These soon came into conflict with the trade unions of the organizations. Staff grade officers were excluded from these committees. Ministerial control over the committees meant they soon became "Ministerial appendages".

== See also ==
- Workers' council
