= National People's Power =

Political party in Sri Lanka

National People's Power ජාතික ජන බලවේගය தேசிய மக்கள் சக்தி
- Abbreviation: NPP
- Leader: Anura Kumara Dissanayake
- General Secretary: Nihal Abeysinghe
- Founder: Anura Kumara Dissanayake
- Founded: 13 July 2019 (7 years ago)
- Headquarters: 464/20 Pannipitiya Road, Pelawatta, Battaramulla, Sri Lanka
- Youth wing: NPP Youth (Note: Section of the Socialist Students Union)
- Women's wing: Progressive Women's Collective
- Ideology: Socialism; Anti-neoliberalism; Progressivism; Left-wing populism; Factions: Communism; Marxism–Leninism
- Political position: Left-wing; Faction: Far-left
- Colours: Maroon
- Slogan: Let The Real People Win
- Parliament of Sri Lanka: 159 / 225
- Local government Bodies: 266 / 341
- Local Government Members: 3,942 / 7,842

Election symbol
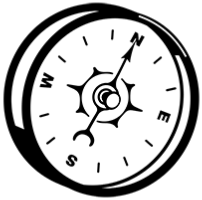
- Compass

Website
- npp.lk

The National People's Power (NPP), known in Sinhala as the Jathika Jana Balawegaya (JJB), is a left-wing political alliance in Sri Lanka. It is the current ruling party of Sri Lanka, having won the 2024 presidential and parliamentary elections. President Anura Kumara Dissanayake is the current leader of the party and Nihal Abeysinghe is the general secretary.

Established in 2019, the NPP is an alliance led by the Janatha Vimukthi Peramuna consisting of 21 different groups, including political parties and other organisations. It contests in elections under the compass symbol. Considered an electorally weak third-party prior to 2024, it briefly formed a minority government under president Anura Kumara Dissanayake following his election. In the subsequent parliamentary elections, the NPP became the largest party in the parliament for the first time with 159 seats, winning a supermajority.

== History ==
The NPP was formed by the members of the leftist Janatha Vimukthi Peramuna and over 20 other groups, including political parties, worker unions, women's rights groups and youth organizations including members of ethnic minority communities. It was formed as a coalition of left-wing and progressive parties that aimed to present an alternative to the existing political establishment in Sri Lanka.

=== Opposition (2019–2024) ===
In the 2020 parliamentary elections, the SLPP achieved a landslide victory as the ruling party, while the Samagi Jana Balawegaya became the main opposition party. The NPP only secured 3 seats and remained a third party. Dissanayake later said in a speech that he was unsatisfied with the SLPP's victory and the NPP's defeat. When the 20th Amendment to the Constitution of Sri Lanka was announced, the NPP launched a protest against it.

=== In government (2024–present) ===
The NPP saw a surge in popular support during the 2022 Sri Lankan protests, amid dissatisfaction with the incumbent political establishment and the economic crisis. In the first vote count of the 2024 presidential election, NPP presidential candidate Anura Kumara Dissanayake won a plurality of the vote, with 42.31%. Once the second round of vote counting concluded, Dissanayake was declared the winner and elected president, securing 55.89% of the vote. The following day, Dissanayake formed an interim 3-member NPP government.

Shortly after his inauguration, President Dissanayake dissolved parliament and called for snap parliamentary elections, fulfilling one of his campaign pledges. In the elections, which were held on 14 November 2024, the NPP won a supermajority, securing 159 seats in the 225-member Parliament of Sri Lanka. The NPP won every electoral district except for Batticaloa.

The NPP's majority was the second-largest majority in the country's parliamentary history, and the first election since 1977 where a single party managed to achieve a supermajority. The NPP secured 6,863,186 votes, the highest ever obtained by a single political party in a general election, surpassing the 6,853,690 votes won by the SLPFA in 2020. The NPP also won a record breaking 61.56% of the total vote, overtaking the previous record of 60.33% won by the UPFA in 2010. The NPP won the most seats in the Jaffna District, thus making it the first non-Tamil political party to win this district. Altogether, the NPP won 21 out of 22 electoral districts, and 152 constituencies.

Vijitha Herath, contesting from Gampaha District, won 716,715 preferential votes, the highest ever recorded by a candidate in Sri Lanka. This surpassed previous records set by Ranil Wickremesinghe in 2015 (500,566 votes), Mahinda Rajapaksa in 2020 (527,364 votes), and Harini Amarasuriya earlier in the election with 655,289 votes from the Colombo District. The election also witnessed a milestone in women's representation, with a record 21 female MPs elected, the highest in Sri Lanka's parliamentary history. Among them, 19 represented the NPP.

== Ideology ==
The National People's Power is ideologically left-wing populist and working-class centred. The NPP promotes a unique Sri Lankan economic model based on socialist principles and considers both neoliberalism and "classical socialism" to be failures. The NPP claims to oppose excessive privatisation and supports the state maintaining a role in energy, financial markets, and sectors directly related to national security while limiting involvement in profit-driven businesses.

== Members ==
The NPP is composed of 21 groups, including political parties, youth organisations, women's groups, trade unions, and civil society organisations.

- Janatha Vimukthi Peramuna
- Aluth Parapura
- Ethera Api
- Public Servants for Public Service
- National Bhikkhu Front
- National Trade Union Centre
- Sri Lanka Communist Party (Alternative Group)
- Doctors for Social Justice
- Samabhimani Collective
- United Left Power
- Inter Company Employees' Union
- 71 Sahodrathwa Sansadaya
- Aluth Piyapath
- Mass Guiding Artists
- Janodanaya
- National Intellectuals Organization
- Dabindu Collective
- University Teachers for Social Justice
- Progressive Women's Collective
- Husmata Husmak
- All Ceylon Estate Workers' Union

== Leadership ==
As of November 2026, the current office bearers of the National People's Power are as shown below.

Position	Name
Leader	Anura Kumara Dissanayake
General Secretary	Nihal Abeysinghe
Treasurer	Eranga Gunasekara
Deputy Secretaries	Harini Amarasuriya
Deputy Secretaries	Lal Wijenayake

=== Leaders ===
No.	Leader (birth–death)	Electoral District	Took office	Left office	Tenure	General Secretary (term)
1	Anura Kumara Dissanayake (b. 1968)	Colombo	13 July 2019	Incumbent	7 years, 128 days	Nihal Abeysinghe 2024–present

== NPP Presidents ==
There has been a total of 1 National People's Power president.

No.	Portrait	President (birth–death)	Home Province	Took office	Left office	Tenure	PM Portrait	Prime Minister (term)
(1)		Anura Kumara Dissanayake (b. 1968)	Western	23 September 2024	Incumbent	2 years, 1 month and 26 days		Harini Amarasuriya 2024–present

== Electoral history ==
=== Presidential ===
Election	Candidate	First round		Second round		Result	Ref
Election	Candidate	Votes	%	Votes	%	Result	Ref
2019	Anura Kumara Dissanayake	418,553	3.16%	—N/a		Lost	
2022	Anura Kumara Dissanayake	3 (E.V)	1.37%	—N/a		Lost	
2024	Anura Kumara Dissanayake	5,634,915	42.31%	5,740,179	55.89%	Won	

NPP presidents

As of 2024, there have been a total of 1 National People's Power presidents.

#	President (birth–death)	Home province	Took office	Left office	Tenure	Prime ministers (term)
10	Anura Kumara Dissanayake (b. 1968)	Western	23 September 2024	Incumbent	2 years, 56 days (Note: As of 18 November 2026)	
10	Anura Kumara Dissanayake (b. 1968)	Western	23 September 2024	Incumbent	2 years, 56 days	Amarasuriya 2024–present

=== Parliamentary ===
Parliament of Sri Lanka
Election	Leader	Votes		Seats			Result	Ref
Election	Leader	No.	%	No.	+/–	%	Result	Ref
2015	Anura Kumara Dissanayake	543,944	4.87%	6 / 225	New	New	Opposition	
2020	Anura Kumara Dissanayake	445,958	3.84%	3 / 225	▼3	1.33%	Opposition	
2024	Anura Kumara Dissanayake	6,863,186	61.56%	159 / 225	▲156	70.67%	Government	

NPP prime ministers

As of 2024, there have been a total of 1 National People's Power prime ministers.

No.	Prime Minister (birth–death)	Electoral District	Took office	Left office	Tenure	President (term)
1	Harini Amarasuriya (b. 1970)	Colombo (Note: First entered from the National list)	24 September 2024	Incumbent	2 years, 55 days (Note: As of 18 November 2026)	
1	Harini Amarasuriya (b. 1970)	Colombo	24 September 2024	Incumbent	2 years, 55 days	Dissanayake 2024–present

=== Local Authorities ===
Election	Leader	Votes		Councillors		Local Authorities	Ref
Election	Leader	No.	%	No.	+/–	Local Authorities	Ref
2018	Anura Kumara Dissanayake	710,932	5.75%	434 / 8,327	New	0 / 340	
2019 (Elpitiya)	Anura Kumara Dissanayake	2,435	5.80%	2 / 30	New	0 / 1	
2024 (Elpitiya)	Anura Kumara Dissanayake	17,295	47.64%	15 / 30	▲13	1 / 1	
2025	Anura Kumara Dissanayake	4,503,930	43.26%	3,927 / 7,812	▲3,493	265 / 341	

== See also ==
- Deshapremi Janatha Vyaparaya
- NPP Kottasha Sabha
