= 2019 Elpitiya Pradeshiya Sabha election =

Cancelled local election in Sri Lanka

- 11 October 2019

All 29 council seats of the Elpitiya Pradeshiya Sabha 15 seats needed for a majority
- Registered: 53,384
- Turnout: 78.86%
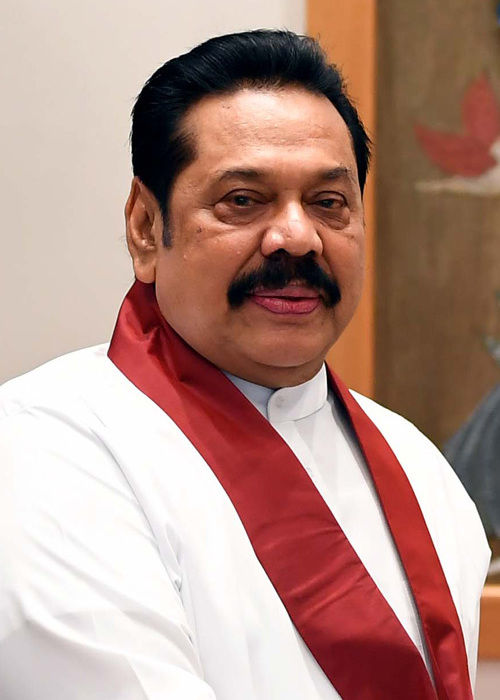

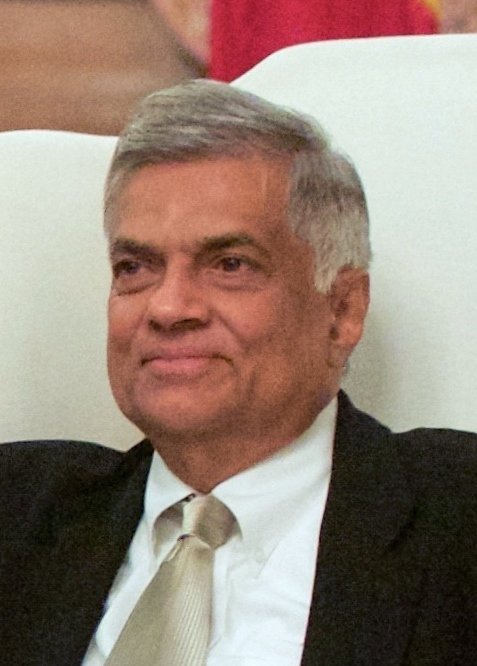

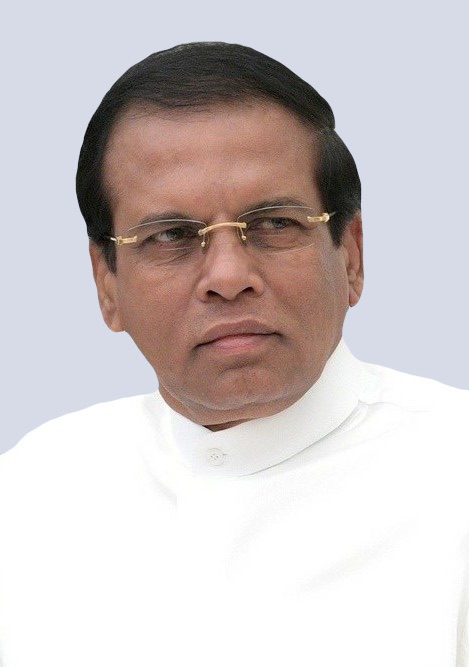

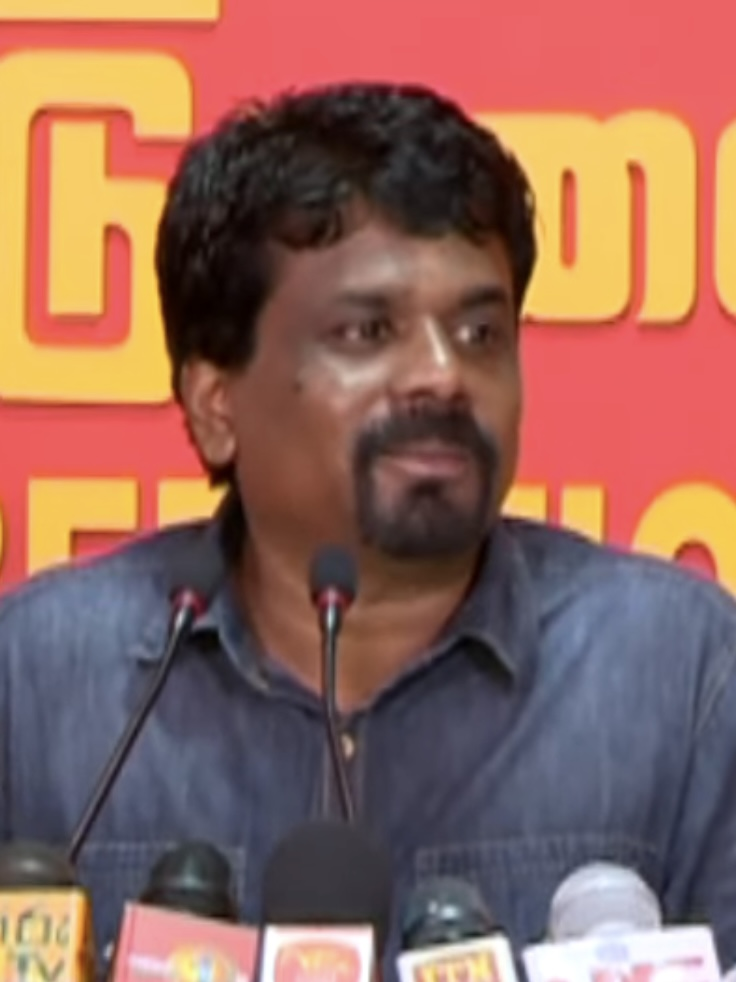
	First party	Second party
Leader	Mahinda Rajapaksa	Ranil Wickremesinghe
Party	SLPP	UNF
Last election	New	4 seats, 30.6%
Seats won	17	7
Seat change	▲17	▲3
Popular vote	23,372	10,113
Percentage	56.3%	24.3%
Swing	▲56.3 pp	▼6.3 pp
	Third party	Fourth party
Leader	Maithripala Sirisena	Anura Kumara Dissanayake
Party	UPFA	JVP
Last election	10 seats, 58.5%	0 seats, 3.2%
Seats won	3	2
Seat change	▼7	▲2
Popular vote	5,273	2,435
Percentage	12.7%	5.8%
Swing	▼45.8 pp	▲2.6 pp
Council control before election
UPFA
Subsequent council control
SLPP

In February 2019, the 2018 Sri Lankan local elections were held in Sri Lanka due to a prior delay. However, due to an injunction issued by the Supreme Court, the election was not held in Elpitiya.

== Background ==
On 30 January 2018, the Supreme Court issued an injunction preventing the election in Elpitiya DC, following a petition by the Democratic United National Front against the rejection of their nomination list.

=== Previous result ===
Won by UPFA
Won by UNP

Local Authority	Type	Dist	Prov	Date of Election	UPFA/ NC Votes	UPFA/ NC Seats	UNP Votes	UNP Seats	JVP Votes	JVP Seats	Ind Votes	Ind Seats	Others Votes	Others Seats	Total Valid Votes	Total Seats	Rejected Votes	Total Polled	Registered Electors	Turnout %	Winner
Elpitiya	DC	GAL	SO	2011-07-23	19,954	10	10,427	4	1,100	0	2,539	1	66	0	34,086	15	1,474	35,560	49,113	72.40%	UPFA

== Results ==
Election results
Alliances and parties	Votes	%	Seats			
Alliances and parties	Votes	%	Ward	PR	Total	+/–
Sri Lanka Podujana Peramuna	23,372	56.3%	17	0	17	▲17
United National Front	10,113	24.3%	0	7	7	▲3
United People's Freedom Alliance	5,273	12.7%	0	3	3	▼7
Janatha Vimukthi Peramuna	2,435	5.8%	0	2	2	▲2
Democratic United National Front	310	0.7%	0	0	0	0
Total	41,503	100.00%	17	12	29	▲14
Valid votes	41,503	98.58%				
Rejected votes	597	1.42%				
Total votes	42,100	100.0%				
Registered voters/turnout	53,384	78.86%				

Won by SLPP
Won by UNF

Dis	Pro	Sri Lanka Podujana Peramuna					United National Front					United People's Freedom Alliance					Janatha Vimukthi Peramuna					Democratic United National Front					Turnout
Dis	Pro	Votes	%	Seats			Votes	%	Seats			Votes	%	Seats			Votes	%	Seats			Votes	%	Seats			Turnout
Dis	Pro	Votes	%	W	PR	T	Votes	%	W	PR	T	Votes	%	W	PR	T	Votes	%	W	PR	T	Votes	%	W	PR	T	Turnout
GAL	SO	23372	56.3%	-	-	17	10113	24.3%	-	-	7	5273	12.7%	-	-	3	2435	5.8%	-	-	2	310	0.7%	-	-	0	42100(53384) ->78.8%
