= Sudarshana Denipitiya =

Sri Lankan politician

Hon. Sudarshana Denipitiya MP
- සුදර්ශන දෙනිපිටිය சுதர்சன தேனிபிட்டிய

Badulla District
- Incumbent
- Assumed office 2020

Personal details
- Party: Sri Lanka Podujana Peramuna
- Other political affiliations: Sri Lanka People's Freedom Alliance

Sudarshana Denipitiya is a Sri Lankan politician and a member of the Sri Lankan parliament from Badulla Electoral District as a member of the Sri Lanka Podujana Peramuna.
