= Lists of massacres =

This article provides a list of articles which contain lists of massacres.

== By past country or territory ==
- List of killings and massacres in Mandatory Palestine
- List of massacres in the Italian Social Republic
- List of massacres in Ottoman Bulgaria
- List of massacres in Ottoman Syria
- List of massacres in Roman Judea
- List of massacres in the Soviet Union
- List of massacres in Yugoslavia
  - List of mass executions and massacres in Yugoslavia during World War II

== By country or territory ==
- List of massacres in Afghanistan
- List of massacres in Albania
- List of massacres in Algeria
- List of massacres in Argentina
- List of massacres in Australia
- List of massacres in Azerbaijan
- List of massacres in Bangladesh
- List of massacres in Belarus
- List of massacres in Belgium
- List of massacres in Bolivia
- List of massacres in Brazil
- List of massacres in Burundi
- List of massacres in Canada
- List of massacres in Chile
- List of massacres in China
- List of massacres in Colombia
- List of massacres in Cyprus
- List of massacres in the Czech Republic
- List of massacres in the Dominican Republic
- List of massacres in Timor-Leste
- List of massacres in Egypt
- List of massacres in El Salvador
- For England, see List of massacres in Great Britain
- List of massacres in Ethiopia
- List of massacres in Finland
- List of massacres in France
- List of massacres in Germany
- List of massacres in Great Britain
- List of massacres in Greece
- List of massacres in Guatemala
- List of massacres in Guyana
- List of massacres in Haiti
- List of massacres in Hungary
- List of massacres in India
  - List of massacres in Jammu and Kashmir
  - List of massacres in Nagaland
- List of massacres in Indonesia
- List of massacres in Iran
- List of massacres in Iraq
- List of massacres in Ireland
- List of massacres in Israel
  - List of massacres in Jerusalem
- List of massacres in Italy
- List of massacres in Jamaica
- List of massacres in Japan
- List of massacres in Kenya
- List of massacres in Kosovo
- List of massacres in Latvia
- List of massacres in Lebanon
- List of massacres in Libya
- List of massacres in Lithuania
- List of massacres in Malaysia
- List of massacres in Mexico
- List of massacres in Myanmar
- List of massacres in Nepal
- List of massacres in New Zealand
- List of massacres in Nigeria
- North America
  - List of Indian massacres in North America
- List of massacres in North Korea
- List of massacres in North Macedonia
- For Northern Ireland, see List of massacres in Ireland
- List of massacres in Pakistan
- List of massacres in Palestine
  - List of massacres in Jerusalem
- List of massacres in Peru
- List of massacres in the Philippines
- List of massacres in Poland
- List of massacres in Puerto Rico
- List of massacres in Romania
- List of massacres in Russia
- List of massacres in Rwanda
- For Scotland, see List of massacres in Great Britain
- List of massacres in Serbia
- List of massacres in Singapore
- List of massacres in Slovakia
- List of massacres in Slovenia
- List of massacres in South Africa
- List of massacres in South Korea
- List of massacres in Spain
- List of massacres in Sri Lanka
- List of massacres in Sudan
- List of massacres in Switzerland
- List of massacres in Syria
- List of massacres in São Tomé and Príncipe
- List of massacres in the Solomon Islands
- List of massacres in Taiwan
- List of massacres in Thailand
- List of massacres in Turkey
- List of massacres in Ukraine
- For United Kingdom, see List of massacres in Great Britain and List of massacres in Ireland
- List of massacres in the United States
- List of massacres in Venezuela
- List of massacres in Vietnam
- For Wales, see List of massacres in Great Britain
- List of massacres in Yemen

== By targeted group ==
- List of Indian massacres in North America
- List of massacres of Armenians
- List of massacres of Azerbaijanis
- List of massacres of Bosniaks
- List of massacres against Hazaras
- List of massacres of Indigenous Australians
- List of massacres of Kurdish people
- List of massacres of Nizari Ismailis
- List of massacres of Turkish people

== By conflict ==
- List of massacres during the Algerian Civil War
- List of massacres during the Bosnian War
- List of massacres during the Croatian War of Independence
- List of massacres during the Eritrean War of Independence
- List of massacres during the Finnish Civil War
- List of massacres during the Greco-Turkish War (1919–1922)
- List of massacres during the Mali War
- List of massacres during the Syrian civil war
- List of mass executions and massacres in Yugoslavia during World War II
- Killings and massacres during the 1948 Palestine war

== Other ==
- List of massacres at sea
- List of school massacres by death toll

== See also ==
- Lists of death toll
- Lists of school shootings in the United States
- List of genocides
- List of major terrorist incidents
- List of mass stabbings by death toll
- List of rampage killers
- List of terrorist incidents
