= VVT =

VVT may refer to:

- Valvettithurai, a town in Sri Lanka
- Variable valve timing, an internal combustion engine valvetrain configuration
- VVT (gang), a gang in Toronto, Canada
- Verkehrsverbund Tirol, public transport organisation in Tyrol, Austria
