= Kumudini boat massacre =

1985 killing of Sri Lankan Tamils

- A jetty from which ferry boats are launched to neighboring islands in the North of Sri Lanka. This jetty was renamed Kumuthini Jetty in memory of the victims of the massacre.
- Location: island of Delft, Jaffna District, Sri Lanka
- Date: May 15, 1985 (+6 GMT)
- Target: Sri Lankan Tamil village residents
- Attack type: Armed massacre
- Weapons: Automatic rifles, Knives, axes
- Deaths: 23
- Perpetrator: Sri Lankan Navy

The Kumudini or Kumuthini boat massacre (Tamil: குமுதினி படகுப் படுகொலைகள்) happened on 15 May 1985, when at least 23 minority Sri Lankan Tamil adults and children on a ferry boat named Kumudini sailing from the island of Delft to the island of Nainathivu were killed by Sri Lankan Navy personnel.

According to eyewitness accounts, six men believed to be from the Sri Lanka navy, dressed in T-shirts and blue trousers and some in shorts, boarded the ferry. One by one, the passengers were called to the aft section of the boat, told to shout their name, age, address, and the destination of their journey, and then hacked to death.

== Background ==
Following two LTTE landmine attacks in Valvettithurai killing 11 military personnel, the Sri Lankan Army carried out the Valvettithurai massacre on 10 May 1985 in which 70 Tamil civilians were killed. In response, the LTTE carried out the Anuradhapura massacre in which 120 Sinhalese civilians were killed on 14 May. This was followed by a series of reprisal massacres against Tamil civilians in which dozens were killed.

== The incident ==
A male eyewitness's account was documented by Amnesty International. The government-owned ferry boat, known as a launch in the local Sri Lankan Tamil dialect, was named Kumudini (also Kumuthini) and frequented a number of islets in the Northern province. On the morning of May 15, 1985, after the ferry left the island of Delft en route to the island of Nainativu, a group of eight armed men approached Kumudini in a fiberglass boat and ordered its crew to halt. Six of the perpetrators boarded the ferry while two remained in the other boat, securing it to Kumudini using a rope. The men had rifles and were dressed variously in blue pants or shorts and T-shirts as worn by the Sri Lankan navy personnel.

All the crew and passengers were forced to enter the forepart of the boat and then to go below deck. The passengers were also told to loudly call out their names, status, locality, and destination; they were then instructed to come out one at a time. One of the men giving the instructions spoke in broken Tamil. The eyewitness and the other people in the fore section did not know that the riflemen were killing each person led away in this manner, as the attackers demanded that the passengers identify themselves at a high enough volume to drown out the victims' cries and threatened to shoot anyone who didn't speak loudly enough.

When the eyewitness made his approach, he found blood and severed body parts all over the upper deck. At this point, he "shouted and refused to move".

"I was then hit on the head and I fell. I felt that I was dragged and cut on my head by some kind of a hatchet. I received further injuries on my stomach and legs and fell between the boards of the bottom of the boat. I pretended to be dead and lay there. I felt further bodies falling over mine and the cries of distress of men and women."

About 45 minutes after the attack on the eyewitness, the fiberglass boat left Kumudini behind.

In 2007, villagers reported to local human rights groups such as UTHR that special knives used by local toddy tappers to tap toddy had been collected and used by the perpetrators to kill the passengers.

== Casualties ==
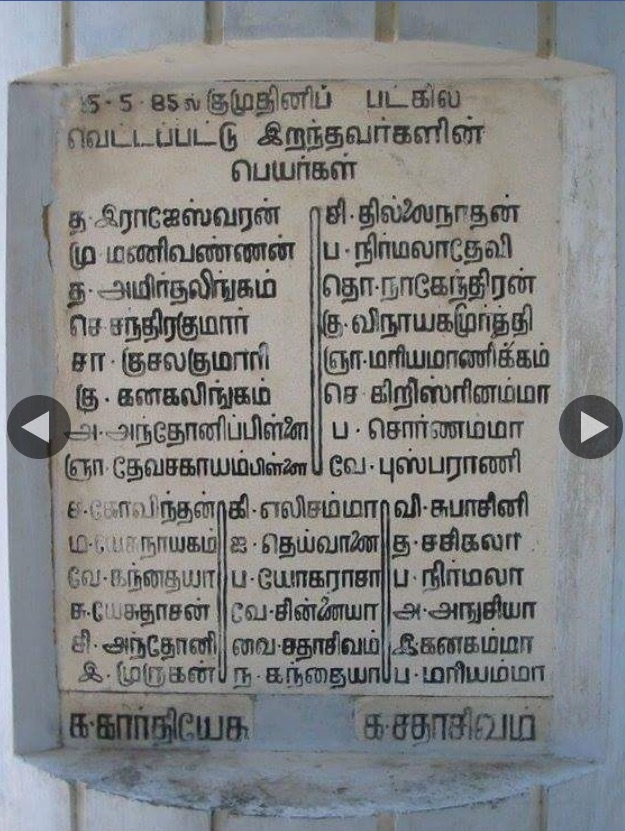
Memorial to the murdered victims

Although various estimates put the death toll anywhere from 36 to 48, Amnesty International could determine only 23 massacre victims' identities.

== Reactions ==
=== Amnesty International ===
Amnesty International identified and recorded the eyewitness accounts of the survivors and wrote a detailed report to the government asking it to take appropriate action against the perpetrators.

=== Sri Lankan government ===
When it was alleged that navy personnel from the Nainathievu island naval base were responsible for the killings, Lalith Athulathmudali, the then Minister for National Security, reportedly stated,

"There is no evidence to show who was responsible,"

=== LTTE ===
The rebel group LTTE’s peace secretariat released a statement on November 22, 2006 that alleged that among the 72 people on board the ferry, about 36 were killed and the rest survived. It also documents the statements of more survivors.

== See also ==
- List of attacks on civilians attributed to Sri Lankan government forces
