= Thondamannar Bridge =

Thondamannar Bridge தொண்டைமானாறு பாலம்
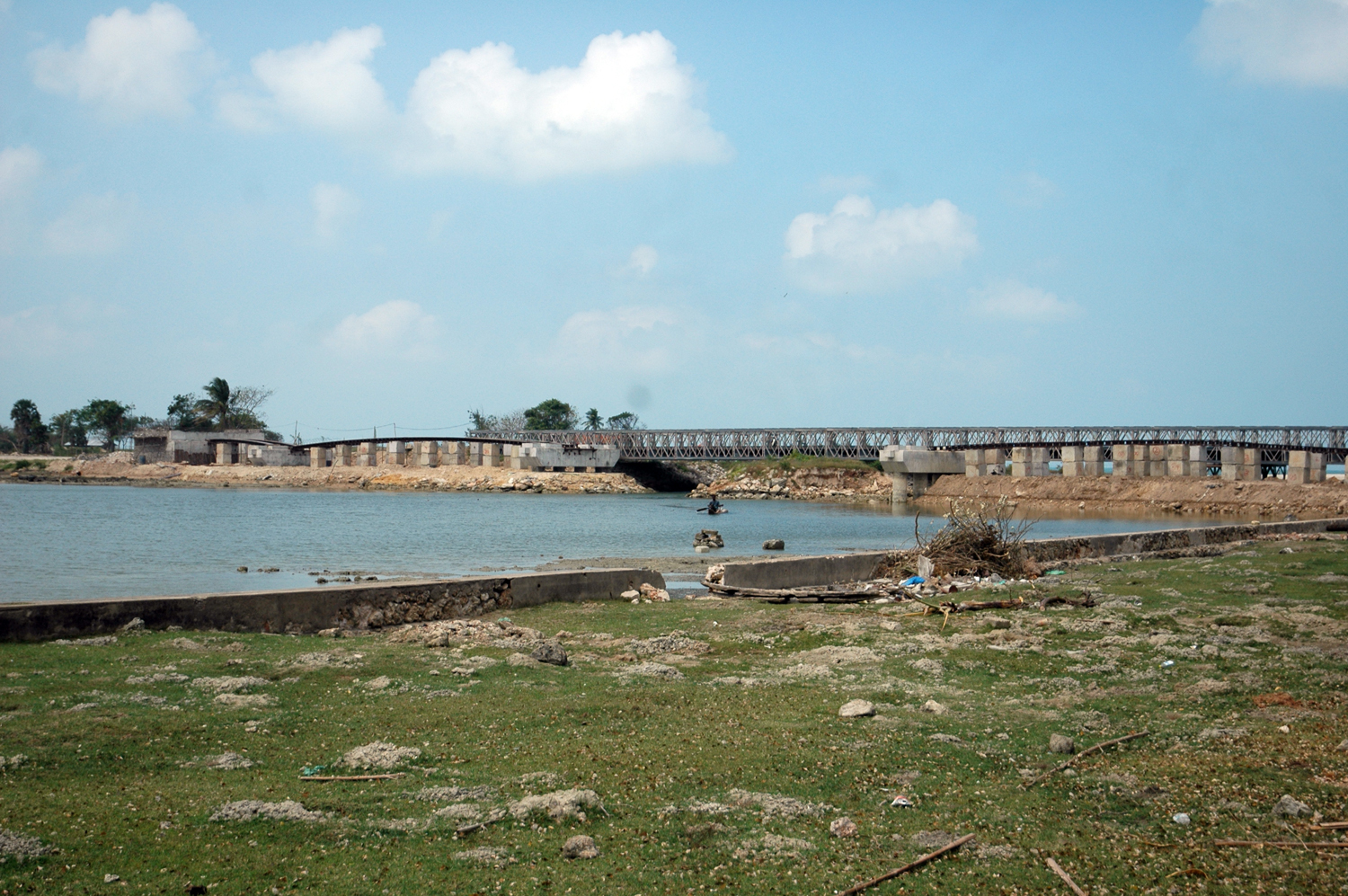
- Coordinates: 9°49′0″N 80°10′0″E
- Carries: Motor vehicles and pedestrians on the AB21 Highway in Northern Province, Sri Lanka
- Crosses: Vadamarachchi Lagoon
- Locale: Valvettithurai, Jaffna District
- Maintained by: Road Development Authority

History
- Construction start: 1947
- Construction end: 1953

Location
- Interactive map of Thondamannar Bridge

Thondamannar Bridge (Tamil: தொண்டைமானாறு பாலம், Thondamanaru Palam) is a road and pedestrian bridge on the Jaffna - Point Pedro highway across the Vadamarachchi Lagoon near the Valvettithurai town of the Northern Province, Sri Lanka in Sri Lanka. It was built in 1953 and destroyed in 1987, and rebuilt afterwards in 2004.

The Thondamannar Bridge was primarily used as a barrage since the beginning of its construction period to prevent sea water entering the Vadamarachchi Lagoon that serves as a primary water source for several villages in the neighborhood.

The Barrage was destroyed in 1987 when it came under fire from the Sri Lankan Army.

The sluice gates before its destruction played a dual role not only preventing seawater entering into the villages but also allowing the floodwater flowing from the land-side into the sea during rainy season.

The bridge along with the barrage was rebuilt by the Department of Irrigation in 2004 and now serves the Jaffna - Point Pedro highway, a key link in the Jaffna District and the Northern Province.
