= 2019 Sri Lankan presidential election =

- 16 November 2019
- Turnout: 83.72% (▲2.20pp)
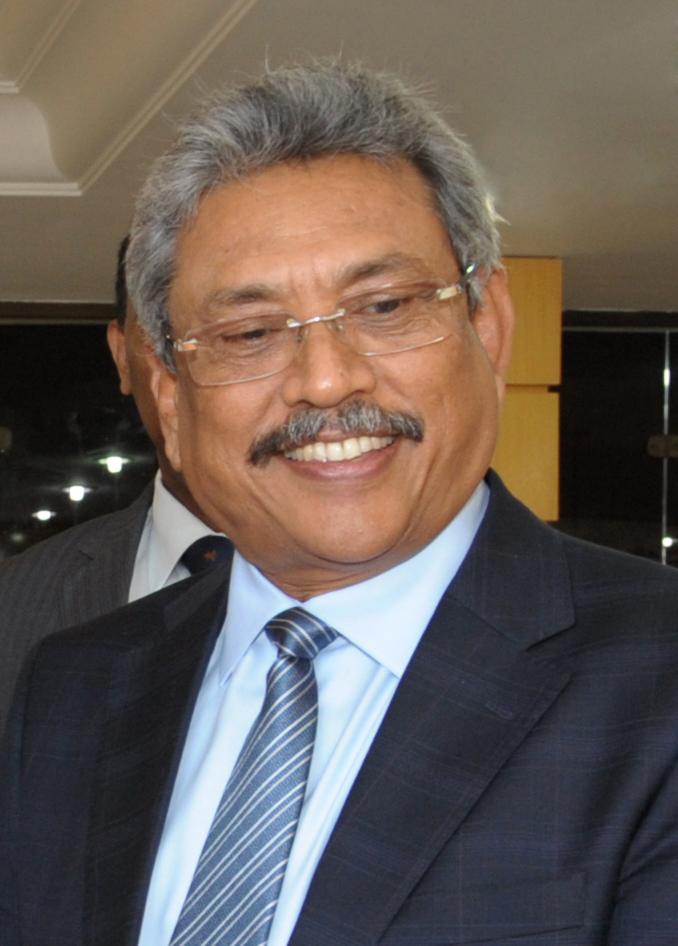

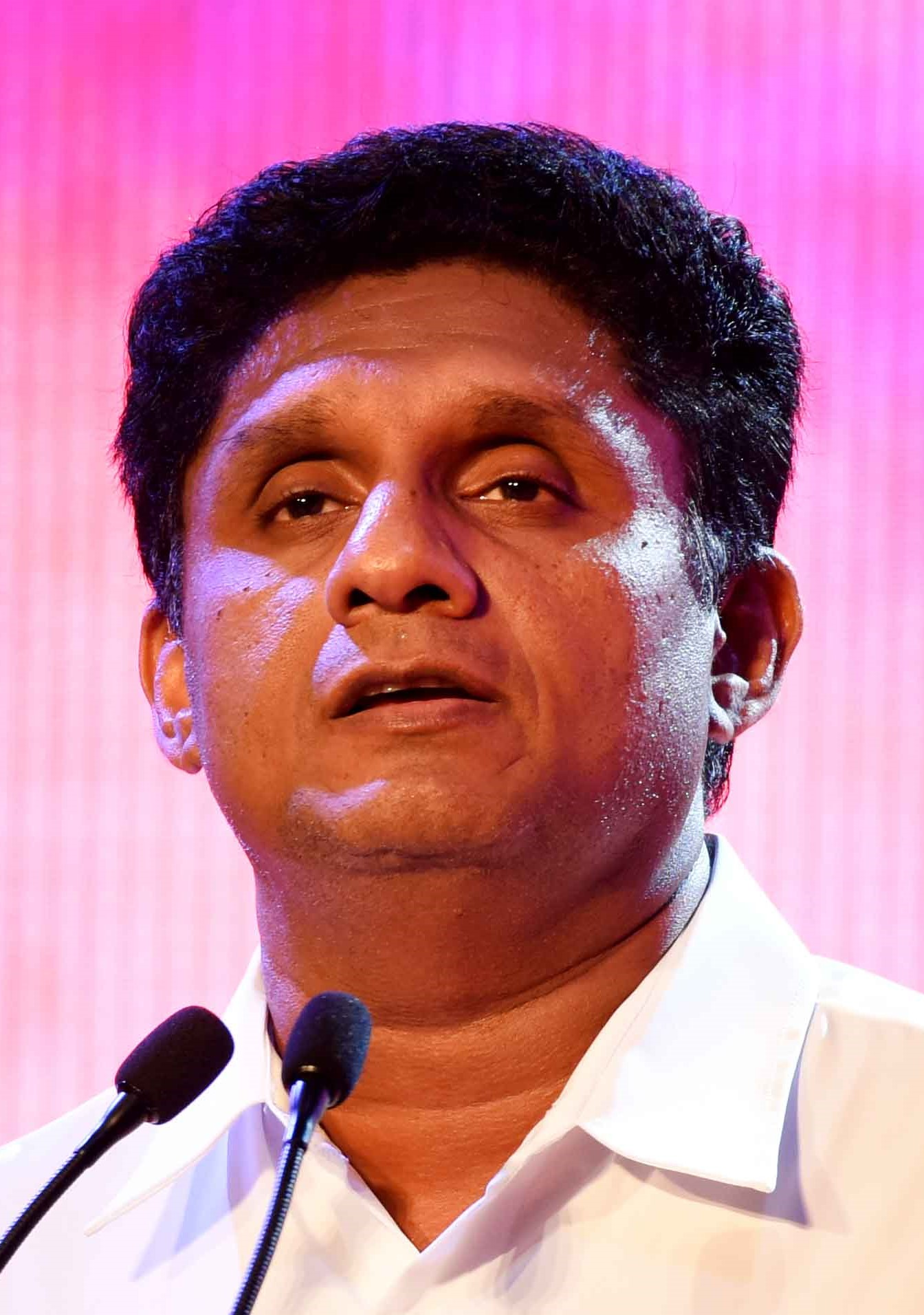
Candidate	Gotabaya Rajapaksa	Sajith Premadasa
Party	SLPP	UNP
Alliance	SLPFA	NDF
Popular vote	6,924,255	5,564,239
Percentage	52.25%	41.99%
- Results by polling division
President before election
Maithripala Sirisena
SLFP
Elected President
Gotabaya Rajapaksa
SLPP

Presidential elections were held in Sri Lanka on 16 November 2019. Incumbent president Maithripala Sirisena did not run for a second term. Gotabaya Rajapaksa, brother of former president Mahinda Rajapaksa, was the candidate of the Sri Lanka Podujana Peramuna and was endorsed by the Sri Lanka Freedom Party. Sajith Premadasa, son of former president Ranasinghe Premadasa and deputy leader of the United National Party was the candidate of the ruling party.

The results were announced on 17 November 2019. Rajapaksa won the election in a landslide victory, receiving 52% of the vote compared his main opponent Premadasa's 42%. The results of the election subsequently brought the Rajapaksa family back to power after a 5-year interregnum.

Sirisena's term of office would have ended on 9 January 2020. This was the first presidential election in Sri Lanka where no sitting president, prime minister or opposition leader ran for president.

== Electoral system ==
The President of Sri Lanka is elected via limited ranked voting. Voters can express up to three ranked preferences for President. If no candidate receives over 50% of valid votes on the first count, all candidates except for the two candidates receiving the highest number of votes are eliminated. The second and third preferences of the eliminated candidates are distributed until one of the remaining two candidates receives an outright majority. In practice, this system has seen little use, as each direct election going back to the first in 1981 has resulted in a candidate from one of the two major parties or alliances at the time winning in the first count. For this reason, many citizens opt to mark only one candidate, and many are wholly unaware that multiple candidates can be ranked at all.

== Timeline ==
2018

- 26 October–16 December – 2018 Sri Lankan constitutional crisis: Mahinda Rajapaksa and President Maithripala Sirisena conspire to take the office of Prime Minister before the election.

2019

- 9 January – President Maithripala Sirisena becomes eligible to call for presidential elections at anytime.
- 31 January – President Sirisena is approved unanimously as the candidate of the Sri Lanka Freedom Party during the Party's Anuradhapura district convention.
- 6 March – Gotabaya Rajapaksa submits application through the United States Embassy to renounce his US citizenship.
- 26 March – Gotabaya Rajapaksa travels to the United States for a personal visit, where he also expects to expedite his request to renounce his citizenship.
- 7 April – While in the United States, Gotabaya Rajapaksa is served with notice of two separate civil lawsuits against him in California over the assassination of journalist Lasantha Wickrematunge as well as on behalf of Roy Samathanam, a Tamil torture survivor.
- 12 April – Gotabaya Rajapaksa returns to Sri Lanka from the United States.
- 21 April – The 2019 Sri Lanka Easter bombings occur.
- 27 April – Gotabaya Rajapaksa announces he will run for president.
- 11 August – Mahinda Rajapaksa and his party, the Sri Lanka Podujana Peramuna, officially declares Gotabaya Rajapaksa as its presidential candidate.
- 12 August – Several members of the United National Party organize a rally in Badulla to promote Sajith Premadasa as the UNP candidate, though the party was yet to name an official candidate. Sajith Premadasa clearly showed his intentions to run for the presidency. All UNFGG MPs in Badulla attended the rally, as well as Harsha de Silva, Eran Wickramaratne, Ajith Perera, Sujeewa Senasinghe, Ranjith Madduma Bandara, Ranjith Aluwihare, Wasantha Aluwihare, Chandrani Bandara Jayasinghe, Buddhika Pathirana, Ankumbura Withanage, and Ashoka Abeysinghe.
- 18 August – Janatha Vimukthi Peramuna leader Anura Kumara Dissanayake is announced as the presidential candidate of the newly formed political alliance, the "National People's Power", in a rally held at Galle Face.
- 23 August – Mangala Samaraweera pledges to support to Sajith as the UNP candidate during a huge rally in Matara.
- 5 September – During a huge rally in Kurunegala, organized by all Kurunegala UNP MPs except Akila Viraj Kariyawasam, MPs pledge to support to Sajith as the UNP candidate.
- 5 September – The Sri Lanka Freedom Party informs the Elections Commission that they will be fielding a candidate for the upcoming presidential election.
- 6 September – Prime Minister and the leader of UNP Ranil Wickremesinghe reportedly expresses his intentions to be the presidential candidate of his party.
- 15 September – The National Elections Commission now has the power to call for a presidential election at any time.
- 18 September – The department of government printing Sri Lanka prints an extraordinary gazette, which lists 7 October 2019 as the date of nominations and 16 November as the date of election with the consultation of the election commission Sri Lanka.
- 24 September 2019 – Prime Minister Ranil Wickremesinghe agrees to nominate UNP Deputy Leader minister Sajith Premadasa as the presidential candidate of the United National Front, the decision is yet to be approved by the working committee of the party.
- 26 September 2019 – United National Party schedule its working committee meets at Sirikotha to select its candidate by party law.
- 26 September 2019 – The working committee of the UNP unanimously selects Sajith Premadasa as its presidential candidate.
- 29 September 2019 – Former Chief of the Sri Lankan Army Mahesh Senanayake announces that he will contest for president under the non-political National People's Movement (NPM), a collective of island-wide civil society organisations.
- 30 September – The Court of Appeal agrees to support the petition against recognizing former Defense Secretary Gotabaya Rajapaksa as a citizen of Sri Lanka on 2 October.
- 1 October – Gotabaya Rajapaksa seeks court permission to travel to Singapore from 9 to 12 October due to a medical issue.
- 2 October – A three-judge bench of the Court of Appeal commences the petition filed against recognizing former Defence Secretary Gotabaya Rajapaksa as a Sri Lankan citizen.
- 3 October – United National Party holds its National Convention at the Sudathasada Indoor Stadium to officially name Sajith Premadasa as its candidate to the public.
- 4 October – Charges against Gotabaya Rajapaksa's citizenship issue are dismissed by the court and Rajapaksa is permitted to contest in the upcoming election.
- 5 October – The first ever presidential debate between presidential candidates is held. All main candidates except Gotabaya Rajapaksa took part in the event.
- 7 October – Nominations for the next president are held between 9:00 a.m. and 11:00 a.m. A record of 33 candidates were nominated.
- 9 October – The SLFP pledges to support SLPP candidate Gotabaya Rajapaksa.
- 15 October – The Sri Lanka Muslim Congress pledges its support for UNP candidate Sajith Premadasa.
- 15 October – The Tamil Progressive Alliance pledges to support UNP candidate Sajith Premadasa.
- 18 October – The Ceylon Workers' Congress pledges to support SLPP candidate Gotabaya Rajapaksa.
- 18 October – The Jathika Hela Urumaya holds a national convention to announce its support for UNP candidate Sajith Premadasa.
- 4 November – The Tamil National Alliance pledges its support for UNP candidate Sajith Premadasa.
- 5 November – Former President of Sri Lanka and SLFP leader Chandrika Kumaratunga pledges to support UNP candidate Sajith Premadasa.
- 16 November – Election day: Election of the next president is held between 7:00 AM and 5:00 PM.
- 17 November 2019 – President Maithripala Sirisena's first term of office ends.
- 18 November 2019 – Gotabaya Rajapaksa is inaugurated as the 8th President of Sri Lanka at Ruwanwelisaya.
- 20 November 2019 – Prime Minister Ranil Wickremesinghe resigns.
- 21 November 2019 – President Gotabaya Rajapaksa appoints his brother Mahinda Rajapaksa as Prime Minister.

== Prior to the election ==
Sri Lankan recent election results
Dates of elections	United National Party (UNFGG)		Sri Lanka Freedom Party (UPFA)		Sri Lanka Podujana Peramuna		Tamil National Alliance		Janatha Vimukthi Peramuna		Sri Lanka Muslim Congress		Independents	
Dates of elections	Votes	%	Votes	%	Votes	%	Votes	%	Votes	%	Votes	%	Votes	%
2015 presidential election	6,217,162	51.28% (Note: New Democratic Front candidate led by the United National Party)	5,768,090	47.58%	－	－	－	－	－	－	－	－	－	－
2015 parliamentary election	5,098,916	45.66%	4,732,664	42.38%	－	－	515,963	4.62%	543,944	4.87%	44,193	0.40%	42,828	0.38%
2018 local elections	3,640,620	29.42%	1,497,234	12.10%	5,006,837	40.47%	337,877	2.73%	710,932	5.75%	92,897 (Note: The SLMC contested separately in 46 LA's and with the UNF in other LA's.)	0.75%	374,132	3.02%

Sri Lankan political map prior to this election
Presidential election, 2015	Parliamentary election, 2015
Elected members of each electoral district or municipalities, gaining the highest number of votes: United People's Freedom Alliance United National Party/United National Front for Good Governance/New Democratic Front Tamil National Alliance

=== Poll prediction ===
Both main candidates have had their own surveys carried out with the results claiming victory for each of them. Earlier circulated polls prediction which was claimed done by National Intelligence Service was proved false and manipulated.

== Nominations ==
=== Sri Lanka Podujana Peramuna (SLPP) ===
After the landslide victory they won at the 2018 local elections, the newly formed Sri Lanka Podujana Peramuna intended to field their own candidate in the presidential election, with Chamal, Basil and Gotabaya (all brothers of former president Mahinda Rajapaksa) being mentioned as potential candidates. Calls for Gotabaya Rajapaksa to run were made even though he was ineligible to run due to his possession of foreign citizenship. Basil also held foreign citizenship and was therefore ineligible.

Chamal Rajapaksa had also signaled his potential candidacy saying he would "willingly consider it if the party nominates him as the next presidential candidate", soon after the announcement made by his brother. Chamal Rajapaksa was unsure whether to contest from the SLFP or the SLPP but preferred a candidate that had the support of both parties.

On 12 January, Gotabaya announced he was ready to run in the elections if he had the support for it, though his announcement stunned senior SLPP leaders. Gotabaya Rajapaksa was a leading government figure during the final stages of the Sri Lankan Civil War and the development processes of the Colombo metropolitan area and the Northern Province.

In March, Chamal denied that neither him nor Basil would contest but avoided commenting on Gotabaya. Meanwhile, the SLPP announced that they favoured Gotabaya unless someone better is found.

Gotabaya Rajapaksa already had a well organized campaign promoting him and according to D. B. S Jeyaraj, the Rajapaksa family had chosen to support Gotabaya as the candidate and that he would renounce his US citizenship.

Gotabaya Rajapaksa announced he would run for presidency on 11 April, six days after the 2019 Sri Lanka Easter bombings. On 11 August, Mahinda Rajapaksa and the SLPP officially announced that his brother Gotabaya would be its presidential candidate, while Mahinda would run as his prime ministerial candidate.

=== United National Party (UNP) ===
The United National Party did not field their own presidential candidate in either the 2010 or 2015 presidential elections and supported a common candidate in both elections. Though Maithripala Sirisena, the UNP-backed candidate, won the 2015 election, UNP expenditure for the election period was 500 million LKR and relations between Sirisena and the UNP had been shaky from the start. The power struggle between the president and UNP prime minister Ranil Wickremesinghe led to the 2018 Sri Lankan constitutional crisis. In the aftermath of the events, most UNP members publicly expressed their regret for supporting a common candidate in 2015 and promised to field their own presidential candidate in the 2019 elections.

Initially, party leader Ranil Wickremesinghe seemed to be the obvious choice for the candidacy and he reportedly expressed his intentions to run for the presidency in a meeting with other senior members. However, several dissident UNP MPs including Mangala Samaraweera, Harin Fernando, Ajith Perera, Harsha de Silva and Sujeewa Senasinghe preferred deputy leader Sajith Premadasa as the UNP candidate, and organized a rally in Badulla where Premadasa himself openly expressed his intentions to be the UNP candidate.

Amidst growing support for deputy leader Sajith Premadasa and party leader Ranil Wickremesinghe refusing to make a move, Speaker of the Parliament Karu Jayasuriya released a statement signaling his intention to run for presidency to end the confusion and avoid a rift within the party. However, the Sajith faction showed that they had the popular support among party members and followers by organizing successful rallies in Matara, Kurunegala, and Matugama.

On 26 September 2019, the working committee of the United National Party unanimously picked Sajith Premadasa as the UNP presidential candidate. Announcing the official statement, UNP General Secretary Akila Viraj Kariyawasam said that Ranil Wickremesinghe would continue to function as the prime minister and leader of the UNP.

=== Sri Lanka Freedom Party (SLFP) ===
Incumbent president and SLFP leader Maithripala Sirisena was eligible to run for a second term. Although he had previously stated that he would only serve a single term, after being sworn in in 2015, he had since expressed his desire to stay for a second term. However, with many party seniors choosing to support the newly formed Sri Lanka Podujana Peramuna led by former president Mahinda Rajapaksa, the SLFP was weakened and suffered a humiliating loss at the 2018 local elections, thus losing the credibility it had as the main opposition to the UNP.

The SLFP pledged to support SLPP candidate Gotabaya Rajapaksa on 9 October.

=== National People's Power (NPP) ===
The National People's Power party announced Janatha Vimukthi Peramuna leader Anura Kumara Dissanayake as their candidate in a massive rally on 18 August at Galle Face.

== Candidates ==
A total of 35 candidates submitted their nominations on 7 October to the election commission.

=== Major candidates ===
Candidate	Political office and constituency	Endorsements	Notes
Sajith Premadasa (52); New Democratic Front	Minister of Housing and Construction (2015–2019); Deputy Leader of the United National Party (2014–2020); Former Deputy Minister of Health (2001–2004); Colombo	United National Party; All Ceylon Makkal Congress; Jathika Hela Urumaya; Sri Lanka Muslim Congress; Tamil National Alliance; Tamil Progressive Alliance; Former President Chandrika Kumaratunga	Son of former president Ranasinghe Premadasa
Gotabaya Rajapaksa (70); Sri Lanka Podujana Peramuna	Former Secretary for the Ministry of Defence and Urban Development (2005–2015)	Sri Lanka Podujana Peramuna; Sri Lanka Freedom Party; Ceylon Workers' Congress; Communist Party of Sri Lanka; Democratic Left Front; Eelam People's Democratic Party; Jathika Nidahas Peramuna; Lanka Sama Samaja Party; Mahajana Eksath Peramuna; National Congress; Pivithuru Hela Urumaya; Tamil Makkal Viduthalai Pulikal	Brother of former president Mahinda Rajapaksa
Anura Kumara Dissanayake (50); National People's Power	Former Minister and Chief Opposition Whip (2015–2018); Leader of the Janatha Vimukthi Peramuna (since 2014); Leader of the National People's Power (since 2015); Colombo	Janatha Vimukthi Peramuna; National Front for Good Governance (NFGG); United Left Front	

=== Other candidates ===
In addition to the 3 candidates mentioned above, 32 other candidates also ran in the election. Ajantha Perera was the only female candidate.

Candidate	Party	Notes
Hassan Mohamed Alavi	Independent	Former UNP MP for Kurunegala.
Siripala Amarasinghe	Independent	Former JVP/UPFA MP for Gampaha.
Ariyawansa Dissanayake	Democratic United National Front	Former UNP MP. Presidential candidate in 1999.
Priyantha Edirisinghe	Okkoma Wasiyo Okkoma Rajawaru Sanwidhanaya	
Milroy Fernando	Independent	Former Minister. Former SLFP/UPFA MP for Puttalam.
Subramanium Gunaratnam	Our National Front	
Samansiri Herath	Independent	Former NFF/UPFA MP for Puttalam.
M. L. A. M. Hizbullah	Independent	4th Governor of the Eastern Province. UPFA National List MP.
Siritunga Jayasuriya	United Socialist Party	Presidential candidate in 2005, 2010 and 2015.
Sarath Keerthirathna	Independent	Former Deputy Minister. Former SLFP/PA MP for Gampaha.
Jayantha Ketagoda	Independent	Former UPFA MP for Colombo.
A. S. P. Liyanage	Sri Lanka Labour Party	Presidential candidate in 2010 and 2015.
Sarath Manamendra	New Sinhala Heritage	Presidential candidate in 2010 and 2015 (endorsed Mahinda Rajapaksa).
Illiyas Idroos Mohamed	Independent	Presidential candidate in 2010 (endorsed Sarath Fonseka) and 2015.
Duminda Nagamuwa	Frontline Socialist Party	Propaganda Secretary of the Frontline Socialist Party. Presidential candidate in 2015.
Bedde Gamage Nandimithra	Nava Sama Samaja Party	
Rohan Pallewatte	National Development Front	Executive Chairman of Lanka Harness Co. (Pvt) Ltd. Endorsed by the Social Democratic Party of Sri Lanka.
Ajantha Perera	Socialist Party of Sri Lanka	Founder of the National Programme on Recycling of Solid Waste.
Saman Perera	Our Power of People Party	
Anuruddha Polgampola	Independent	Former JVP/UPFA MP for Kegalle. Presidential candidate in 2015.
Aparekke Punnananda Thero	Independent	Former JHU/UPFA MP for Gampaha.
Namal Rajapaksa	National Unity Alliance	Presidential candidate in 2015.
Battaramulle Seelarathana Thero	Jana Setha Peramuna	Presidential candidate in 2010 and 2015.
Mahesh Senanayake	National People's Party	22nd Commander of the Sri Lanka Army. Endorsed by the National People's Movement.
M. K. Shivajilingam	Independent	Former TELO/TNA MP for Jaffna. Presidential candidate in 2010.
Aruna De Soyza	Democratic National Movement	Presidential candidate in 2005 and 2010.
Ashoka Wadigamangawa	Independent	Former SLFP/PA MP for Puttalam.
Samaraweera Weerawanni	Independent	3rd Chief Minister of the Uva Province. Former UNP MP for Badulla.
Piyasiri Wijenayake	Independent	Former NFF/UPFA MP for Kalutara. Former Deputy Chairman of Committees.
Rajiva Wijesinha	Independent	Former LP/UPFA National List MP. Presidential candidate in 1999.
Vajirapani Wijesiriwardene	Socialist Equality Party	Presidential candidate in 2015.
Ajantha de Zoysa	Ruhunu People's Party	Former SLFP/PA National List MP. Endorsed Sajith Premadasa.

=== Withdrawn candidates ===
The following candidates initially declared their intentions to contest the election but later withdrew from the campaign.

Sri Lanka Freedom Party

- Maithripala Sirisena, 7th President of Sri Lanka (2015–2019), former Member of Parliament (1989–2015)

United National Party

- Ranil Wickremesinghe, 10th Prime Minister of Sri Lanka (1993–1994, 2001–2004, 2015–2018, 2018–2019), Member of Parliament (1989–2020)
- Karu Jayasuriya, 20th Speaker of the Parliament of Sri Lanka, Member of Parliament (2000–2020)

=== Rejected candidates ===
The following candidates placed deposits before the nomination date but failed to appear and submit nomination papers.

- Basheer Segu Dawood, former SLMC/UNF Member of Parliament (2000–2015)
- Jayantha Liyanage
- Kumara Welgama, SLFP/UPFA Member of Parliament (1994–2024)
- Chamal Rajapaksa, 19th Speaker of the Parliament of Sri Lanka, SLFP/UPFA Member of Parliament (1989–2024)
- Gunapala Tissakuttiarachchi, former UNP Member of Parliament (1989–1994)
- Maheepala Herath, 8th Chief Minister of the Sabaragamuwa Province (2004–2017)

== Results ==
Candidate	Party	Votes	%
Gotabaya Rajapaksa	Sri Lanka Podujana Peramuna	6,924,255	52.25
Sajith Premadasa	New Democratic Front	5,564,239	41.99
Anura Kumara Dissanayake	National People's Power	418,553	3.16
Mahesh Senanayake	National People's Party	49,655	0.37
M. L. A. M. Hizbullah	Independent	38,814	0.29
Ariyawansa Dissanayake	Democratic United National Front	34,537	0.26
Ajantha Perera	Socialist Party of Sri Lanka	27,572	0.21
Rohan Pallewatte	National Development Front	25,173	0.19
Siripala Amarasinghe	Independent	15,285	0.12
Milroy Fernando	Independent	13,641	0.10
M. K. Shivajilingam	Independent	12,256	0.09
Battaramulle Seelarathana	Jana Setha Peramuna	11,879	0.09
Ajantha de Zoysa	Ruhunu People's Party	11,705	0.09
Anuruddha Polgampola	Independent	10,219	0.08
Namal Rajapaksa	National Unity Alliance	9,497	0.07
Jayantha Ketagoda	Independent	9,467	0.07
Duminda Nagamuwa	Frontline Socialist Party	8,219	0.06
Aparekke Punnananda Thero	Independent	7,611	0.06
Subramanium Gunaratnam	Our National Front	7,333	0.06
A. S. P. Liyanage	Sri Lanka Labour Party	6,447	0.05
Piyasiri Wijenayake	Independent	4,636	0.03
Aruna de Zoysa	Democratic National Movement	4,218	0.03
Rajiva Wijesinha	Independent	4,146	0.03
Illiyas Idroos Mohamed	Independent	3,987	0.03
Siritunga Jayasuriya	United Socialist Party	3,944	0.03
Sarath Keerthirathna	Independent	3,599	0.03
Sarath Manamendra	New Sinhala Heritage	3,380	0.03
Pani Wijesiriwardene	Socialist Equality Party	3,014	0.02
Ashoka Wadigamangawa	Independent	2,924	0.02
A. H. M. Alavi	Independent	2,903	0.02
Saman Perera	Our Power of People's Party	2,368	0.02
Priyantha Edirisinghe	Okkoma Wesiyo Okkoma Rajawaru Sanwidhanaya	2,139	0.02
Samaraweera Weerawanni	Independent	2,067	0.02
Bedde Gamage Nandimithra	Nava Sama Samaja Party	1,841	0.01
Samansiri Herath	Independent	976	0.01
Total		13,252,499	100.00
Valid votes		13,252,499	98.99
Invalid/blank votes		135,452	1.01
Total votes		13,387,951	100.00
Registered voters/turnout		15,992,096	83.72
Source: Election Commission

=== By district ===
Districts won by Rajapaksa
Districts won by Premadasa

Summary of the 2019 Sri Lankan presidential election by electoral district
Electoral District	Province	Rajapaksa		Premadasa		Others		Total Valid	Rejected Votes	Total Polled	Registered Electors	Turnout
Electoral District	Province	Votes	%	Votes	%	Votes	%	Total Valid	Rejected Votes	Total Polled	Registered Electors	Turnout
Ampara	Eastern	135,058	32.82%	259,673	63.09%	16,839	4.09%	411,570	3,158	414,728	503,790	82.32%
Anuradhapura	North Central	342,223	58.97%	202,348	34.87%	35,775	6.16%	580,346	4,916	585,262	682,450	85.76%
Badulla	Uva	276,211	49.29%	251,706	44.92%	32,428	5.79%	560,345	6,978	567,323	657,766	86.25%
Batticaloa	Eastern	38,460	12.68%	238,649	78.70%	26,112	8.61%	303,221	4,258	307,479	398,301	77.20%
Colombo	Western	727,713	53.19%	559,921	40.92%	80,543	5.89%	1,368,177	15,333	1,383,510	1,670,403	82.82%
Galle	Southern	466,148	64.26%	217,401	29.97%	41,809	5.76%	725,358	5,878	731,236	858,749	85.15%
Gampaha	Western	855,870	59.28%	494,671	34.26%	93,259	6.46%	1,443,800	15,751	1,459,551	1,751,892	83.31%
Hambantota	Southern	278,804	66.17%	108,906	25.85%	33,664	7.99%	421,374	3,179	424,553	485,786	87.40%
Jaffna	Northern	23,261	6.24%	312,722	83.86%	36,930	9.90%	372,913	11,251	384,164	564,714	68.03%
Kalutara	Western	482,920	59.49%	284,213	35.01%	44,630	5.50%	811,763	6,847	818,610	955,079	85.71%
Kandy	Central	471,502	50.43%	417,355	44.64%	46,018	4.92%	934,875	9,020	943,895	1,111,860	84.89%
Kegalle	Sabaragamuwa	320,484	55.66%	228,032	39.60%	27,315	4.74%	575,831	5,152	580,983	676,440	85.89%
Kurunegala	North Western	652,278	57.90%	416,961	37.01%	57,371	5.09%	1,126,610	8,522	1,135,132	1,331,705	85.24%
Matale	Central	187,821	55.37%	134,291	39.59%	17,109	5.04%	339,221	3,252	342,473	401,496	85.30%
Matara	Southern	374,481	67.25%	149,026	26.76%	33,361	5.99%	556,868	3,782	560,650	652,417	85.93%
Monaragala	Uva	208,814	65.34%	92,539	28.95%	18,251	5.71%	319,604	3,000	322,604	366,524	88.02%
Nuwara Eliya	Central	175,823	36.87%	277,913	58.28%	23,128	4.85%	476,864	7,155	484,019	569,028	85.06%
Polonnaruwa	North Central	147,340	53.01%	112,473	40.47%	18,111	6.52%	277,924	2,563	280,487	326,443	85.92%
Puttalam	North Western	230,760	50.83%	199,356	43.91%	23,860	5.26%	453,976	4,478	458,454	599,042	76.53%
Ratnapura	Sabaragamuwa	448,044	59.93%	264,503	35.38%	35,124	4.70%	747,671	5,853	753,524	864,978	87.11%
Trincomalee	Eastern	54,135	23.39%	166,841	72.10%	10,434	4.51%	231,410	1,832	233,242	281,114	82.97%
Vanni	Northern	26,105	12.27%	174,739	82.12%	11,934	5.61%	212,778	3,294	216,072	282,119	76.59%
Total		6,924,255	52.25%	5,564,239	41.99%	764,005	5.76%	13,252,499	135,452	13,387,951	15,992,096	83.72%

== Maps ==
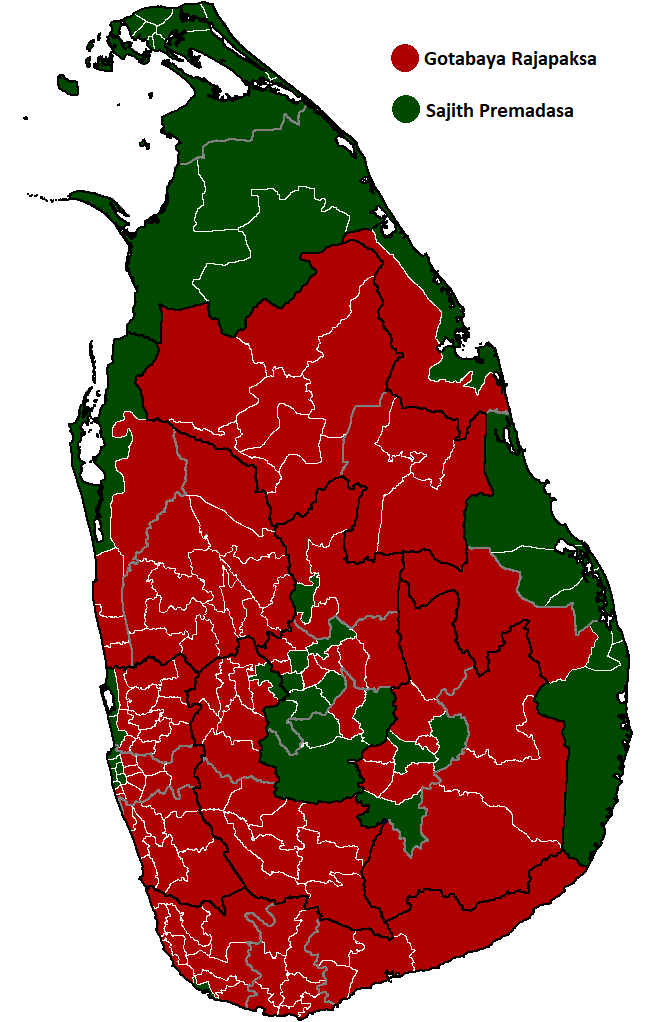
Winners of polling divisions

Majorities according to polling divisions

Majorities according to electoral districts

== Aftermath ==
=== Resignations ===
Minister Mangala Samaraweera informed President Maithripala Sirisena via a letter that he would step down as Minister of Finance with immediate effect. In the letter, minister Samaraweera stated that the 2019 election was the most peaceful and fair election held in the recent past.

In a tweet, Minister Harin Fernando said, respecting the people's mandate, he will step down as Minister of Sports, Telecommunications and Foreign Employment. He will also be resigning from his positions at the United National Party. “I take this opportunity to thank every one who supported me in my tenure, hope good work done will be continued”, he added.

Non-Cabinet Minister Ajith P. Perera said, respecting the mandate of the people of Sri Lanka, that he has decided to resign from his position as the Minister of Digital Infrastructure and IT with immediate effect. Tagging Sajith Premadasa he added, “It was a well fought battle”, “and the country needs your leadership at this critical time”.

State Minister Ruwan Wijewardene congratulated Gotabaya Rajapaksa via Twitter for his victory in the election and said he will step down as State Minister of Defence. “I hope we will be able to build a nation free of division that unites all communities to take this country forward,” he added.

Minister Kabir Hashim decided after the results were announced to resign as the Chairman of the United National Party and as the Minister of Highways, Road Development and Petroleum Resources Development.

Issuing a statement, Minister Malik Samarawickrama said he will step down as Minister of Development Strategies and International Trade.

Minister of Megapolis and Western Development, Patali Champika Ranawaka, resigned from his ministerial portfolio. In a letter to President Gotabaya Rajapaksa, he stated that he took this decision with respect to the people's mandate.

=== International reactions ===
Supranational bodies

- European Union – A statement was issued noting that Sri Lanka's election process was peaceful and confirmed the stability of the democratic institutions, while adding the EU was looking forward to working with the new President Gotabaya Rajapaksa to continue improving human rights, reconciliation and good governance. While congratulating President Rajapaksa, the EU assured that it will remain fully supportive of the broader reform agenda in Sri Lanka.

Nations

- China – Foreign Ministry spokesperson Geng Shuang expressed congratulations on the election of Gotabaya Rajapaksa.
- India – Prime Minister Narendra Modi tweeted after Premadasa had conceded defeat, congratulating Rajapaksa.
- Japan – The Ministry of Foreign Affairs of Japan announced that Prime Minister Shinzo Abe sent a congratulatory message and expressed his intentions to further develop Japan–Sri Lanka relations with Gotabaya Rajapaksa, the new President of Sri Lanka.
- Iran – Foreign Ministry spokesman Abbas Mousavi congratulated the Sri Lankan nation and president-elect on holding presidential elections successfully.
- Maldives – President Ibrahim Mohamed Solih was the first world leader to congratulate Rajapaksa on his "resounding election victory".
- Pakistan – Foreign Affairs Ministry issued a statement stating: "The Government and leadership of Pakistan warmly felicitate the newly-elected President".
- Singapore – Prime Minister Lee Hsien Loong issued a statement stating: "I am confident that you will be able to steward Sri Lanka through these challenges ably, and that Sri Lanka will make progress in achieving lasting peace and prosperity under your Presidency."
- Russia – President Vladimir Putin issued a statement stating: "The Russian-Sri Lankan relations are of traditionally friendly nature, I wish you every success, good health and prosperity."
- United States – The U.S. Embassy in Colombo in a statement said that "We commend the Elections Commission, civil society and government authorities for promoting a peaceful election. We are ready to continue our work with the new President and with all the people of Sri Lanka in supporting the country's sovereignty through heightened good governance, expanded economic growth, the advancement of human rights and reconciliation, and in fostering an Indo-Pacific region where all countries can prosper."

== See also ==
- 2019 in Sri Lanka
