= Tamil People's National Alliance =

Tamil People's National Alliance தமிழ் மக்கள் தேசிய கூட்டணி
- Abbreviation: TPNA/TMTK
- Leader: C. V. Vigneswaran
- President: Suresh Premachandran
- General Secretary: Sivasakthy Ananthan
- Founded: 9 February 2020 (5 years ago)
- Split from: Tamil National Alliance
- Headquarters: 26/10, First Lane, Kandy Road, Vavuniya, Sri Lanka.
- Ideology: Tamil nationalism
- Parliament: 0 / 225

Election symbol
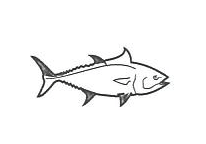
- Fish

Party flag
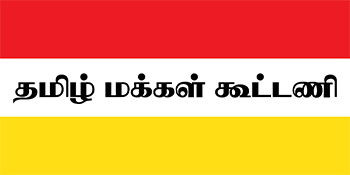

Website
- thetmk.org

The Tamil People's National Alliance (abbreviated TPNA; Tamil: தமிழ் மக்கள் தேசிய கூட்டணி, romanized: Tamiḻ Makkaḷ Tēciya Kūṭṭaṇi), also known as the Thamizh Makkal Tesiya Kootani (abbreviated TMTK), is a political alliance in Sri Lanka that represents the country's Sri Lankan Tamil ethnic minority. It was formed in February 2020 by a group of Tamil nationalist parties after they broke away from the Tamil National Alliance. The alliance is recognised by the Election Commission of Sri Lanka as registered political party with the fish as its symbol.

== History ==
On 9 February 2020 four parties, consisting of dissident members of the Tamil National Alliance (TNA), signed a memorandum of understanding at the Tilko Hotel in Jaffna to form the Tamil People's National Alliance (Thamizh Makkal Tesiya Kootani) to contest the parliamentary election. The four parties were:

- Eelam People's Revolutionary Liberation Front (EPRLF), led by former MP Suresh Premachandran
- Eelam Tamil Self Rule Party (Eela Thamilar Suyatchchi Kazhagam, ETSK), led by provincial minister Ananthi Sasitharan
- Tamil National Party (Thamizh Thesiya Katchi, TTK), led by former MPs M. K. Shivajilingam and N. Srikantha
- Tamil People's Alliance (Thamizh Makkal Kootani, TMK), led by former chief minister C. V. Vigneswaran

The TPNA claimed that it would give alternative leadership for the Tamil people as the TNA, which had dominated Tamil politics since its formation in 2001, had moved away from its manifesto and had failed to deliver on the pledges made to the Tamil people of north-eastern Sri Lanka.

Vigneswaran's is the alliance's leader while Premachandran is president and Sivasakthy Ananthan is general-secretary. The alliance has an eleven-member governing council chaired by Vigneswaran - six from the TMK, two each from the EPRLF and TTK and one from the ETSK.

== Electoral history ==
Election	Northern Province			Eastern Province			National		
Election	Votes	%	Seats	Votes	%	Seats	Votes	%	Seats
2020 Parliamentary	44,716	7.89%	1	6,585	0.73%	0	51,301	0.44%	1

== Election results ==
=== 2020 Parliamentary General Election ===
In the 2020 Sri Lankan parliamentary election, in which the Sri Lanka People's Freedom Alliance , led by Mahinda Rajapaksa, retained power, the Tamil People's National Alliance, led by C. V. Vigneswaran, won 0.44% of the popular vote and 1 out of 225 seats in the Sri Lankan parliament.

Votes and seats won by the TPNA by electoral district

Electoral District	Votes	%	Seats	Turnout	TPNA MPs
Jaffna	35,927	10.00%	1	68.92%	C. V. Vigneswaran (TPA)
Vanni	8,789	4.23%	0	39.60%	
Batticaloa	4,960	1.66%	0	76.83%	
Trincomalee	1,625	0.76%	0	78.62%	
Total	51,301	0.44%	1	75.89%	
Source:"Parliamentary General Election – 2020".
