= Anuradhapura massacre =

Massacre of Sinhalese civilians in Anuradhapura in 1985 by the LTTE

- Anuradhapura (Sri Lanka)
- Location: Anuradhapura, Sri Lanka
- Date: May 14, 1985; 41 years ago
- Attack type: Massacre
- Weapon: Guns
- Deaths: 146 Sinhalese men, women and children
- Perpetrator: Liberation Tigers of Tamil Eelam (LTTE)

The Anuradhapura massacre occurred in Sri Lanka in 1985 and was carried out by the Liberation Tigers of Tamil Eelam. This was the largest massacre of Sinhalese civilians by the LTTE to date; it was also the first major operation carried out by the LTTE outside a Tamil majority area. Initially, EROS claimed responsibility for the massacre, but it later retracted the statement, and joined the PLOTE in denouncing the incident. The groups later accused the LTTE for the attack. Since then, no Tamil militant group has admitted to committing the massacre. However, state intelligence discovered that the operation was ordered by the LTTE's leader Velupillai Prabhakaran. He assigned the massacre to the LTTE Mannar commander Victor (real name Marcelin Fuselus) and it was executed by Victor's subordinate Anthony Kaththiar (alias Radha). The LTTE claimed the attack was in revenge of the 1985 Valvettiturai massacre, where the Sri Lanka Army killed 70 Tamil civilians in Prabhakaran's hometown. In 1988, the LTTE claimed that the massacre was planned and executed under the guidance of Indian intelligence agency, RAW.

== Incident ==
The LTTE hijacked a bus on May 14, 1985, and entered Anuradhapura. As the cadres entered the main bus station, they opened fire indiscriminately with automatic weapons killing and wounding many civilians who were waiting for buses. The cadres then drove to the Sri Maha Bodhi shrine and gunned down nuns, monks and civilians as they were worshipping inside the Buddhist shrine. The attackers had massacred 146 Sinhalese men, women and children in total, in Anuradhapura.

Before they withdrew, the attackers entered the Wilpattu National Park, taking the park warden Abraham hostage, they rounded up and massacred 24 employees of the Department of Wildlife Conservation. Only one survived.

== Retaliation ==
Anti-Tamil riots broke out in Anuradhapura town soon after the massacre. Sinhalese mob went on a rampage, burning and looting 8 Tamil-owned shops. Kathiresan Hindu temple and several Tamil houses were also burned. Between 15 and 20 Tamil civilians were brutally killed and burned to death. More Tamils were killed the following day. An angered army corporal shot dead 9 Tamil civilians who had sought refuge in the army camp, who kept shooting until he was killed by his commanding officer. On the two days following the attack, 75 Tamil civilians lost their lives.

== Aftermath ==
As the first massacre of Sinhalese civilians carried out by the Tamil militants outside the northern and eastern provinces, the Sinhalese public at large became conscious of the fact that the violence could be brought to their territory as well. The public shock was the primary reason that led to the cease-fire agreement between the government and the Tamil militant groups. The realization that the conflict couldn't be solved by purely military means softened the Sinhalese opposition to accommodation with the Tamils, thereby enabling the government for the first time to seriously consider a political settlement based on regional autonomy to the Tamil areas.

== See also ==
- List of attacks attributed to the LTTE
- 1998 Temple of the Tooth attack

== References and further reading ==
- Gunaratna, Rohan. (1998). Sri Lanka's Ethnic Crisis and National Security, Colombo: South Asian Network on Conflict Research. ISBN 955-8093-00-9
- Gunaratna, Rohan. (October 1, 1987). War and Peace in Sri Lanka: With a Post-Accord Report From Jaffna, Sri Lanka: Institute of Fundamental Studies. ISBN 955-8093-00-9
- Gunasekara, S.L. (November 4, 2003). The Wages of Sin, ISBN 955-8552-01-1
- Sri Lanka Tamil Terror Time May 27, 1985
