= List of massacres at sea =

== List of events ==
Date	Location	Name	Deaths	Description
29 November 1781, et seq	Caribbean Sea, east of Jamaica	Zong massacre	132–142	In order to claim on insurance, 132 to 142 African slaves were thrown overboard when potable water ran low.
8 April 1917	Western Approaches, 150 miles south-west of Scilly	SS Torrington	34	After torpedoing Torrington, U-55s commander took the crew on deck and sank their lifeboats, then submerged, leaving them to drown. One crew member survived.
27 June 1918	Western Approaches, 116 miles west of Fastnet	Llandovery Castle	234	After torpedoing a Hospital ship, contrary to international law, U-86 rammed and sank lifeboats, firing on survivors. 24 crew escaped.
8 August 1940	Central Atlantic, 800 miles west of Canary Islands	SS Anglo Saxon	39	After sinking Anglo Saxon, German raider Widder fired on the lifeboats. One escaped, two crew survived.
4 March 1943	Indian Ocean	SS Tjisalak	105	After torpedoing Tjisalak, Japanese submarine I-8 took the survivors on board, then beat them to death.
18 March 1943	Pacific Ocean, Bismarck Sea	Akikaze	~60	The destroyer Akikaze picked up German missionaries from New Guinea and was ordered by 8th Fleet command to execute them all.
13 March 1944	South Atlantic	SS Peleus	32	After torpedoing Peleus, U-852 fired on survivors clinging to wreckage. Three survived.
18 March 1944	Indian Ocean, off Tanjung Priok	SS Behar	104–108	After sinking Behar, Japanese cruiser Tone took the crew on board, then later killed them by beheading. Four men escaped.
26 March 1944	Pacific Ocean, Bismarck Sea	Bismarck Sea Massacre	2,890+	After destroying a Japanese convoy, Allied boats and planes attacked Japanese rescue vessels, as well as survivors on life rafts and swimming or floating in the sea.
5 May 1985	Jaffna District, Sri Lanka	Kumudini boat massacre	23	Kumudini boat massacre, massacre of 23 Tamil civilians by the Sri Lankan Navy in the sea off Jaffna District, Sri Lanka.
2 January 1993	Jaffna District, Sri Lanka	Jaffna lagoon massacre	38	Jaffna lagoon massacre, massacre of 38 Tamil civilians by Sri Lankan Navy in the sea off Jaffna District, Sri Lanka.

== See also ==
- Mass grave
- List of riots
