= Ajantha Perera =

Sri Lankan social activist

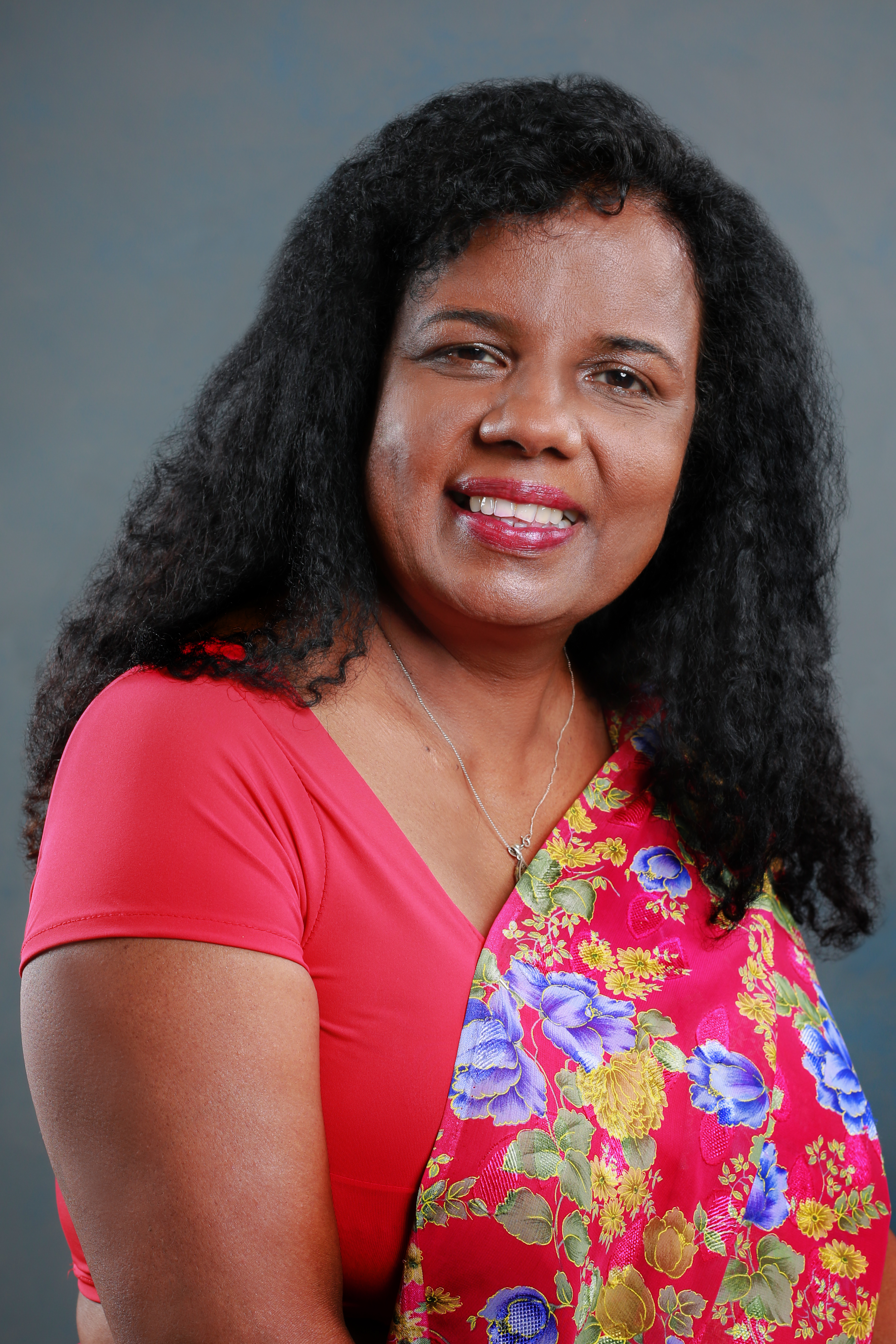
- Born: 1963 (age 62–63)
- Education: PhD
- Alma mater: University of Colombo
- Occupations: Social activist, Scientist, Academic, EnvironmentalIst
- Known for: Founder of National Programme on the Recycling of Solid Waste
- Political party: United National Party (since 2020); Socialist Party of Sri Lanka (2019)

Ajantha Wijesinghe Perera (Sinhala: අජන්තා පෙරේරා) is a Sri Lankan academic, scientist, university lecturer, environmental activist and politician. She is known for her efforts to end the garbage crisis in Sri Lanka and is nicknamed as Garbage Queen. She founded the National Programme on Recycling of Solid Waste to solve the garbage crisis. She was also a candidate in the 2019 Sri Lankan presidential elections, the only female candidate in the election and the first female presidential candidate since 1999.

== Early life and education ==
Ajantha Perera completed her higher studies in England and returned to Sri Lanka at the age of 23. She joined the University of Kelaniya as an assistant lecturer in biochemistry, physiology and zoology. She joined the University of Colombo as a senior lecturer in environmental studies, where she also completed her graduation.

== Career ==
Perera has worked as an expert with several ministries in Sri Lanka and in Fiji. She is currently working to make a recycling management strategy for solid waste in the country.

She took an interest in politics in 2019 and contested in the 2019 Sri Lankan presidential elections as a candidate of the Socialist Party of Sri Lanka. She received only 27,572 votes, making her the seventh most-voted candidate. She was the only female candidate in the election and the first female presidential candidate in Sri Lanka since 1999.

In February 2020, she joined the United National Party following an invitation suggested by UNP leader Ranil Wickremesinghe, as Perera's grandfather had also represented the party before. She contested in the 2020 Sri Lankan parliamentary elections representing the UNP in the Colombo district, but failed to get elected.
