= Jaffna lagoon massacre =

1993 killing of civilians by government forces during the Sri Lankan Civil War

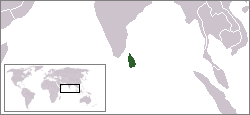
- Location of Sri Lanka
- Location: Jaffna, Sri Lanka
- Date: 2 January 1993 (+6 GMT)
- Target: Sri Lankan Tamil civilians
- Attack type: Shooting, Stabbing
- Weapons: Guns, Knives
- Deaths: 35 - 100
- Injuries: Unknown
- Perpetrator: Sri Lankan Navy

The Jaffna lagoon massacre or Kilaly massacre occurred on January 2, 1993, when a Sri Lankan Navy Motor Gun Boat and a number of smaller speed boats intercepted a number of boats transporting people between the south and north shores of the Jaffna Lagoon in the Northern province in Sri Lanka, and attacked them under the glare of a spot light. The estimated number of deaths range from thirty five (35) to one hundred (100). However, only fourteen (14) bodies were recovered. It was reported that other victims of this massacre were burnt along with their boats. The Sri Lankan government claims that the boats were transporting rebel Liberation Tigers of Tamil Eelam (LTTE) cadres.

== Background ==
The incident occurred during the Sri Lankan civil war, which began with the 1983 Black July pogrom. In the early 1990s civilians, mostly minority Sri Lankan Tamils, were living within the rebel Liberation Tigers of Tamil Eelam (LTTE) controlled Jaffna Peninsula. They were forced to use boats to travel to mainland Sri Lanka, as the land connection between the mainland and the Jaffna Peninsula, which is separated by the Jaffna lagoon (also known as Kilaly lagoon), was blocked by a military camp at the isthmus of Elephant Pass. The rebel group LTTE had also prohibited civilians from using the land route.

Prior to the January 2 attack, roughly 15 civilians that were trying to cross the lagoon had been killed by the Navy, which lead boat operators to refuse to travel the route. This stranded 800 people on both sides of the lagoon without food and shelter. Eventually, the boat operators relented and began traveling between the peninsula and the mainland on January 2.

== The attack ==
On January 2, 1993, Saturday night passengers were seen leaving in batches of 15 to 20 in each boat at regular intervals. The first four boats from Kilaly in the rebel LTTE occupied north shore reached the mainland to the south without incident. A naval gun boat fitted with a cannon was in the lagoon at the time. This boat could operate in an area in the centre of the lagoon, where the water was deep enough, but could not approach the shores. Following the four passenger boats was a speed boat with three outboard motors. which was commonly used by LTTE. The passengers in the speed boat were not armed. Upon seeing the Naval gun-boat, the speed boat made a U-turn and sped away towards the north shore. The Gun-boat gave a chase, and the speed boat ran close to a group of passenger boats, which were heading south from the north shore, and escaped northwards.

From a distance, The gun-boat opened fire on these passenger boats, and continued to fire for up to half an hour, according to a Reuters report. The gun-boat did not receive return fire at any stage. Although the gun-boat did not go near the attacked boats, the boats were boarded by Sri Lankan Navy men who came in other smaller boats.

=== Eyewitness account ===
According to the testimony of survivor K. Sellathurai, between 7pm and 8pm, personnel from a navy boat appeared by the side of the passenger boats and ordered them to stop. A spotlight was aimed on the people on the boats. Shots were then fired at all those on board. After the attack, the boats were taken under tow. However, one of the four boats broke loose and was left drifting, and eventually ran aground on the mainland. On board were four survivors and nine dead bodies; some of them had stab wounds.

According to another eyewitness, Navy sailors, after killing the boat occupants, went on to rob the dead of valuables. There were also five boats with dead and injured that are said to have been taken by the navy. According to local reports, Of the five boats towed away, the bodies of the dead were placed in one boat, which was set on fire. It is believed that all those injured in the five towed boats were killed by Navy personnel, and their corpses set aflame. Many of the dead also had gaping wounds, which suggests that cannons, not small arms, were used. Many of the bodies that were recovered were badly mutilated.

== Casualty estimation ==
The Virakesari, a local Tamil daily newspaper published from Colombo, Sri Lanka, reported on January 5 that 14 bodies were recovered and brought to the Killinochchi hospital. Among the recovered bodies, six were women. Amnesty International, in a 1994 report, estimated that hundreds of civilians were killed while trying to cross the Kilaly lagoon.

== Government reaction ==
A government version of this incident broadcast over Makkal Kural for a Tamil language audience did speak about a speed boat that approached the gun-boat, did a U-turn, and ran into the passenger boats. However, it added that a speed boat had fired at the navy, which was denied by civilian witnesses. According to The Island, quoting the Sri Lankan government, naval patrol boats operating in the Jaffna lagoon blasted at least four fiber glass dinghies last Saturday night, killing over a dozen persons. According to the Naval personnel, the dinghies were operated by Sea Tigers, and were moving in a convoy when the Navy patrol boats had swooped down on them. However, some of the dinghies had escaped, carrying the wounded persons. Following the massacre, the government announced that it was considering opening a safe passage in the lagoon for civilians to cross, so long as it was done during the day time under strict Naval control

== See also ==
- List of attacks on civilians attributed to Sri Lankan government forces
