= Social Democratic Party of Sri Lanka =

Social Democratic Party of Sri Lanka ශ්‍රී ලංකා සමාජ ප්‍රජාතන්ත්‍රවාදී පක්ෂය இலங்கை சமூக ஜனநாயகக் கட்சி
- Abbreviation: SDPSL
- Leader: Rohan Pallewatte
- President: Krishan Deheragoda
- General Secretary: Ananda Stephen
- Founded: 4 July 2017 (7 years ago)
- Ideology: Big tent
- Slogan: Dignified Society, Prosperous Country

Election symbol
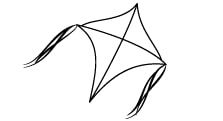
- Kite

Website
- www.sdpsl.lk

The Social Democratic Party of Sri Lanka is an unrecognised political party in Sri Lanka. The party was launched by Rohan Pallewatte, businessman and candidate in the 2019 presidential election.
