= List of massacres in Jerusalem =

This is a list of massacres in Jerusalem.

Name	Date	Casualties	Perpetrator(s)
Jerusalem riots of 66	66	6000	Gessius Florus
Siege of Jerusalem (1099)	1099		First Crusade
Siege of Jerusalem (1244)	1244, August 11	~5,700	Khwarazmians
1920 Nebi Musa riots	1920	9	Arab rioters
King David Hotel bombing	1946, July 22	91	Irgun
Bab al-Amud massacre	1947, December 29	14	Irgun
Semiramis Hotel bombing	1948, January 5	24-26	Haganah
1948 Ben Yehuda Street bombing	1948, February 22	58	Arab irregulars and British deserters
1948 Jewish Agency bombing	1948, March 11	12	Arab forces
Hadassah medical convoy massacre	1948, April 13	79	Arab forces
Zion Square refrigerator bombing	1975, July 4	15	(Palestine Liberation Organization) PLO
Al Aqsa Massacre	1990, October 8	17	Israel Border Police
Ramat Eshkol bus bombing	1995, August 21	6	Hamas
Jaffa Road bus bombings	1996, February 25 - March 3	47	Hamas
1997 Mahane Yehuda Market bombings	1997, July 30	18	Hamas
1997 Ben Yehuda Street Bombing	1997, September 4	8	Hamas
1997–99 Jerusalem stabbings	1997, November 30 – 1999, January 13	2-3	Chaim Perlman (suspected)
Sbarro restaurant bombing	2001, August 9	16	Hamas
2001 Ben Yehuda Street Bombings	2001, December 1	13	Hamas
Yeshivat Beit Yisrael massacre	2002, March 2	12	al-Aqsa Martyrs' Brigades
Patt Junction bus bombing	2002, June 18	19	Hamas
Hebrew University massacre	2002, July 31	9	Hamas
Davidka Square bus bombing	2003, June 11	17	Hamas
Shmuel HaNavi bus bombing	2003, August 19	24	Hamas
2004 Jerusalem bus 19 bombing	2004, January 29	11	Hamas Al-Aqsa Martyrs' Brigades
Liberty Bell Park bus bombing	2004, February 22	8	Al-Aqsa Martyrs' Brigades
Mercaz HaRav massacre	2008, March 6	9	Alaa Abu Dhein
2014 Jerusalem synagogue attack	2014, November 18	8	Two Palestinian gunmen

== See also ==
- Ben Yehuda Street bombings
- List of massacres in Israel
