= Tamil National Liberation Alliance =

- President: Nallathamby Srikantha
- Secretary-General: M. K. Shivajilingam
- Founder: M. K. Shivajilingam, Nallathamby Srikantha
- Founded: 22 February 2010
- Dissolved: 25 June 2011
- Split from: Tamil National Alliance
- Merged into: Tamil National Alliance
- Ideology: Tamil Nationalism

The Tamil National Liberation Alliance (TNLA) was a Sri Lankan political alliance representing the Sri Lankan Tamil ethnic minority in the country. It was launched on 22 February 2010 as breakaway faction of the Tamil National Alliance (TNA). In June 2011 the party was dissolved and its leaders rejoined Tamil Eelam Liberation Organization and the TNA.
