= List of massacres in Puerto Rico =

The following list is a list of massacres that have occurred in Puerto Rico:

Name	Date	Location	Deaths	Notes
Río Piedras massacre	1935-10-24	Río Piedras	5	Puerto Rico Police officers confronted and opened fire on supporters of the Puerto Rican Nationalist Party. Four Nationalist Party members were killed, and one police officer was wounded during the shooting
Ponce massacre	1937-03-21	Ponce	21	
Utuado uprising	1950-10-30	Utuado	10	
Dupont Plaza Hotel arson	1986-12-31	San Juan	98	
Cayey Massacre	1994-03-13	Cayey	4	
Sabana Seca massacre	2009-10-17	Sabana Seca	8	
2019 Río Piedras shooting	2019-10-14	Río Piedras	6	
Mayagüez massacre	2020-10-15	Mayagüez	3	
Caldo de Oso Massacre	2021-10-24	Naranjito	3	
Cidra massacre	2021-12-07	Cidra	5	
2023 Carolina, Puerto Rico, massacre	2023-06-25	Carolina	5	
