= Samansiri Herath =

Sri Lankan politician

Hon. Samansiri Herath සමන්සිරි හේරත් சமன்சிறி ஹேரத் MP

Member of Parliament for Puttalam District
- In office 2004–2010

Personal details
- Party: National Freedom Front (since 2008)
- Other political affiliations: Janatha Vimukthi Peramuna (before 2008); United People's Freedom Alliance

Chandrasekara Herath Hitihami Koralalage Samansiri is a Sri Lankan politician and a former member of the Parliament of Sri Lanka. He was a minor candidate in the 2019 presidential elections, in which he placed in last place.
