= Valvettithurai Urban Council =

Local authority

Valvettithurai Urban Council வல்வெட்டித்துறை நகர சபை

Type
- Type: Local authority

Leadership
- Chairman: Ramachandran Suren, TULF since 23 August 2022
- Deputy Chairman: Thangavelayutham Suntharalingam, EPRLF since May
- Seats: 17

Elections
- Last election: 2018 Sri Lankan local government elections

Website
- valvaicouncil.com

Valvettithurai Urban Council (Tamil: வல்வெட்டித்துறை நகர சபை Valveṭṭittuṟai Nakara Capai; VUC) is the local authority for the town of Valvettithurai in northern Sri Lanka. VUC is responsible for providing a variety of local public services including roads, sanitation, drains, housing, libraries, public parks and recreational facilities. It has 9 members elected using the open list proportional representation system.

== Election results ==
=== 1983 local government election ===
Results of the local government election held on 18 May 1983:

Alliances and parties	Votes	%	Seats
Tamil United Liberation Front	173	94.02%	9
All Ceylon Tamil Congress	7	3.80%	0
United National Party	4	2.17%	0
Valid Votes	184	100.00%	11
Rejected Votes	0		
Total Polled	184		
Registered Electors	8,954		
Turnout	2.05%		

According to the pro-LTTE TamilNet, the Sri Lankan government had suspended all local government in the north and east of the country in 1983 using emergency regulations. The civil war prevented elections from being held for VUC until 1998 as the LTTE did not hold elections when it controlled the area.

In March 1994 elections were held in the east and in Vavuniya in the north. However, elections weren't held in other areas of the north, including the Jaffna Peninsula, because most of these areas were at that time controlled by the rebel Tamil Tigers. In August 1995 the Sri Lankan military launched an offensive to recapture the Jaffna Peninsula. By December 1995 the military had captured most of the Valikamam region of the peninsula, including the city of Jaffna. By 16 May 1996 the military had recaptured the entire peninsula. In late 1996 the government announced elections would be held for 23 local authorities in Jaffna District, Kilinochchi District, Mannar District and Vavuniya District but following opposition from Tamil political parties postponed them. On 3 December 1997 the government announced that elections would be held for the 17 local authorities on the Jaffna Peninsula. The Tamil political parties were still opposed to holding elections as "normalcy" hadn't returned to the peninsula. The peninsula was under the firm grip of the Sri Lankan military and civil government had little, if any, role in the administration of the peninsula. The Tamil Tigers were also firmly against the elections being held. Despite these objections the elections were held on 29 January 1998.

=== 1998 local government election ===
Results of the local government election held on 29 January 1998:

Alliances and parties	Votes	%	Seats
Tamil Eelam Liberation Organization	736	60.13%	6
Eelam People's Democratic Party	283	23.12%	2
Democratic People's Liberation Front (PLOTE)	151	12.34%	1
Eelam People's Revolutionary Liberation Front	54	4.41%	0
Valid Votes	1,224	100.00%	9
Rejected Votes	255		
Total Polled	1,479		
Registered Electors	11,128		
Turnout	13.29%		

On 1 January 2002 local authority elections were called for the entire country. It was later announced that elections would be held on 25 March 2002 in the north and east, and on 20 March 2002 in the rest of the country. The normal life term of Sri Lankan local government bodies is four years. The life term of VUC expired in February 2002 but the central government extended this by another year, as the law allows. On 21 March 2002 the Election Commissioner announced that the elections in the north and east, except for eight local authorities in Ampara District, had been postponed until 25 September 2002. On 17 September 2002 elections in the north and east were postponed, for a second time, until 25 June 2003. Elections should have been held when the extension expired in February 2003 but in January 2003, following a request from the Tamil National Alliance, the central government instead dissolved VUC using emergency powers and instead put in place special commissioners to administer the local area. In June 2003 elections in the north and east were postponed, for a third time, until 24 January 2004. In January 2004 elections in the north and east, except for local authorities in Ampara District, were postponed, for a fourth time, until 23 October 2004.

On 27 January 2006 local authority elections were called for the entire country. It was later announced that elections would be held on 30 March 2006 across the entire country. The Election Commissioner subsequently postponed the elections in the north and Batticaloa District until 30 September 2006. On 23 September 2006 elections in the north and Batticaloa District were postponed until 30 June 2007.

VUC continued to be administered by special commissioners until the 2011 elections.

=== 2011 local government election ===
Results of the local government election held on 23 July 2011:

Alliances and parties	Votes	%	Seats
Tamil National Alliance (ITAK, EPRLF (S), TELO, PLOTE, TULF)	2,416	76.36%	7
United People's Freedom Alliance (EPDP, SLFP et al.)	653	20.64%	2
United National Party	93	2.94%	0
Independent	2	0.06%	0
Valid Votes	3,164	100.00%	9
Rejected Votes	230		
Total Polled	3,394		
Registered Electors	5,550		
Turnout	61.15%		

The following candidates were elected: Nadarajah Anantharaj (TNA), 1,436 preference votes (pv); M. K. Shivajilingam (TNA-TELO), 1,165 pv; Kandasamy Sathees (TNA), 771 pv; Mahalingam Mayuran (TNA), 758 pv; Thillaiyampathy Jegathees (TNA), 654 pv; Soosaippillai Xaviyar Kulanayagam (TNA), 458 pv; Ponnuthurai Theiventhiran (UPFA), 457 pv; Kanagarajah Jeyarajah (TNA), 399 pv; and Inthiran Kailajini (UPFA), 199 pv.

Nadarajah Anantharaj (TNA) and M. K. Shivajilingam (TNA-TELO) were appointed Chairman and Deputy Chairman respectively.
