= List of massacres in Singapore =

The following is a list of massacres that have occurred in Singapore (numbers may be approximate):

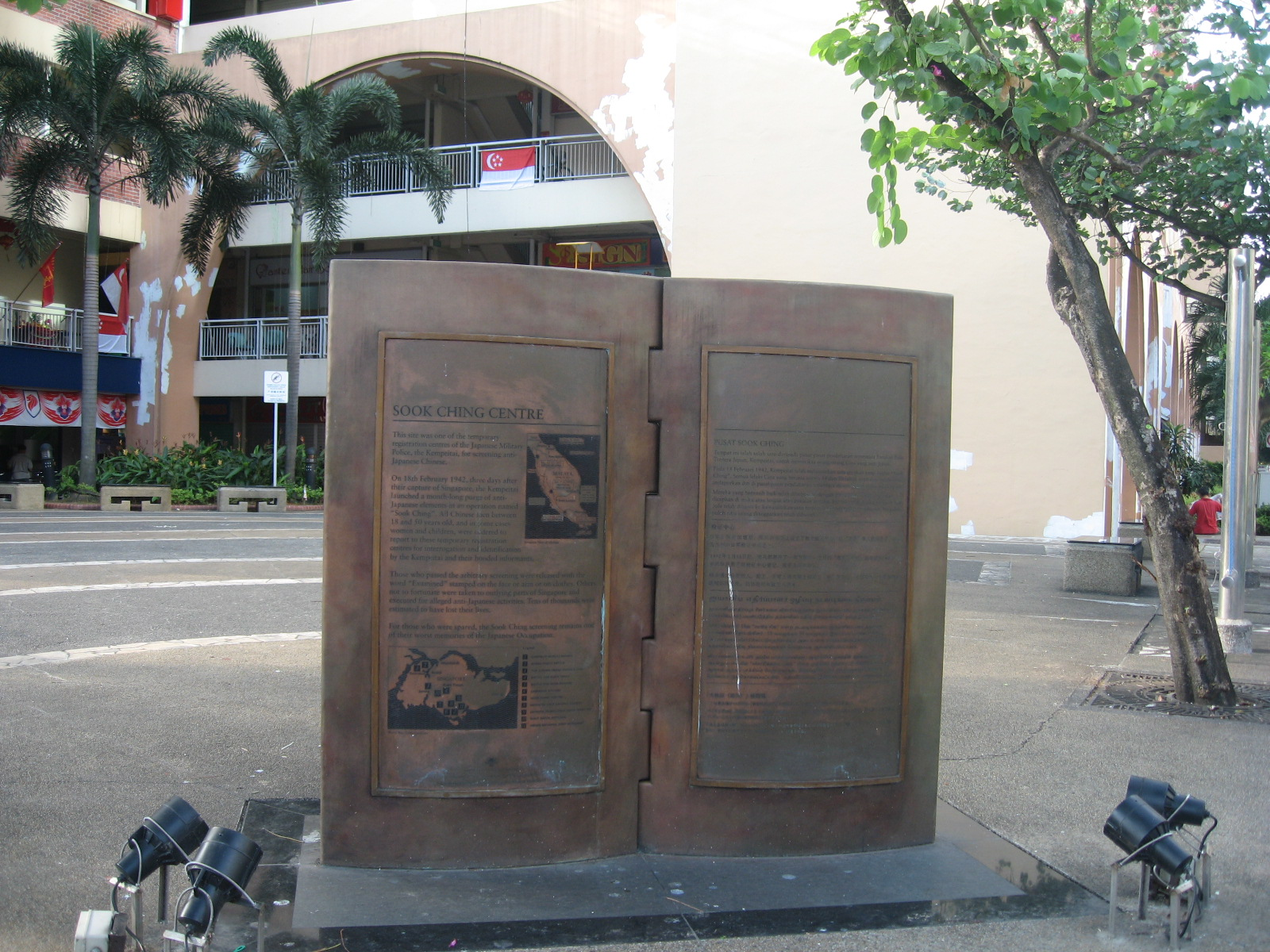
The Sook Ching Centre Monument at Hong Lim Complex in Chinatown

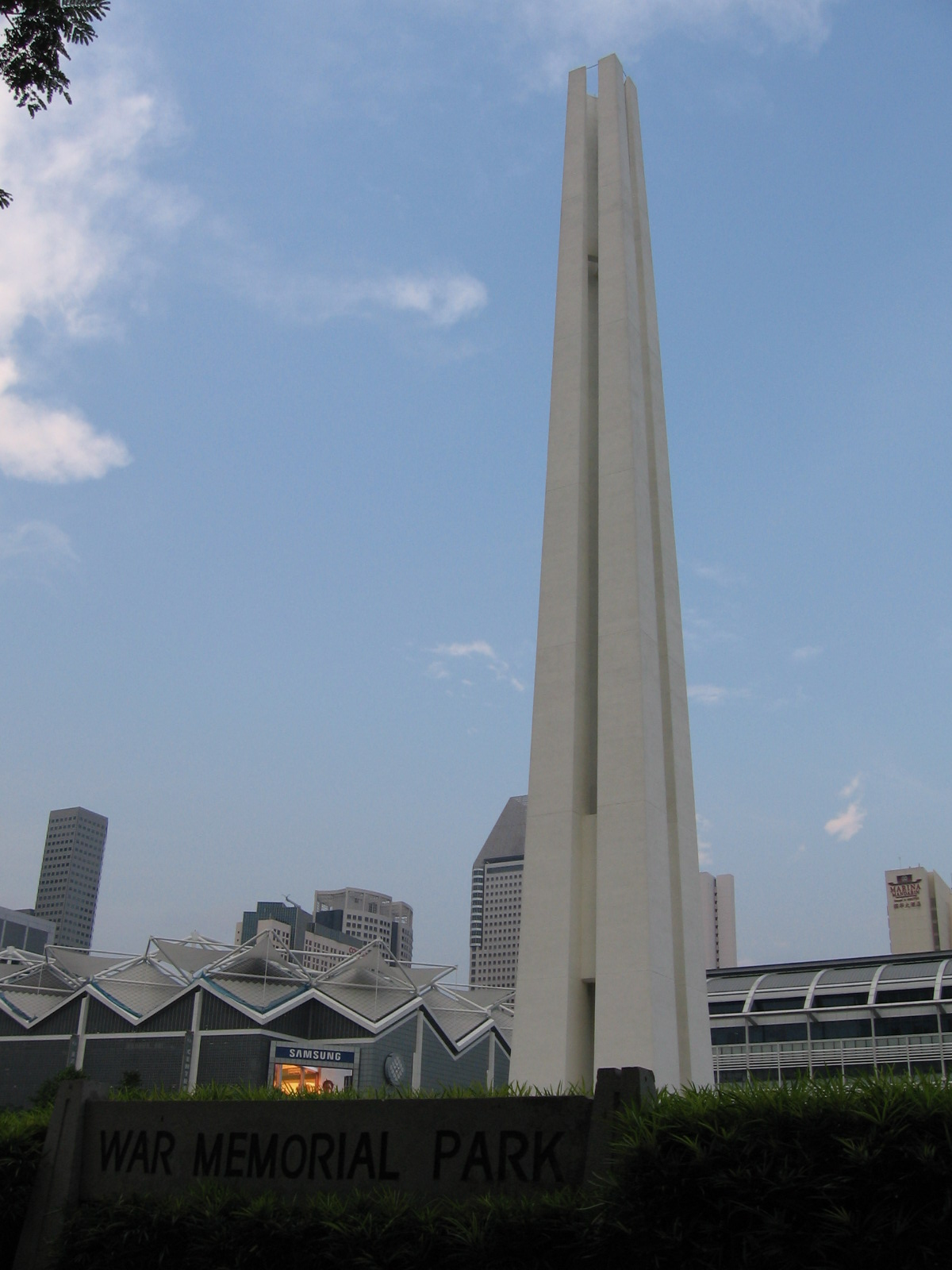
The Civilian War Memorial in the War Memorial Park at Beach Road. The four columns are a symbolic representation of the four major races of Singapore, namely the Chinese, Malays, Indians and Eurasians.

Name	Date	Location	Deaths	Perpetrator(s)	Notes
1915 Singapore Mutiny	February 15, 1915	Singapore	36	British Indian Army's 5th Light Infantry	
Sook Ching massacre	February 18 – March 2, 1942	Singapore	40,000–50,000	Imperial Japanese Army, Military Police Corps	
Selarang Barracks Incident	August 30 - September 5, 1942	Singapore	≥4	Indian National Army	
Double Tenth incident	October 10, 1943	Singapore	57	Imperial Japanese Army, Military Police Corps	
Geylang Bahru family murders	January 6, 1979	Block 58, Geylang Bahru	4	Unknown	
Ang Mo Kio family murders	March 28, 1983	Ang Mo Kio, Singapore	3	Lim Beng Hai and Michael Tan Teow	
Yishun triple murders	September 18, 2008	Yishun, Singapore	3	Wang Zhijian	
2022 Ang Mo Kio flat stabbing	January 11, 2022	Ang Mo Kio, Singapore	2	David Brian Chow Kwok-Hun	
