= Socialist Party of Sri Lanka =

Sri Lankan leftist political party

Socialist Party of Sri Lanka ශ්‍රී ලංකා සමාජවාදී පක්ෂය
- Founded: 2006
- Split from: United Socialist Party
- Ideology: Socialism; Marxism; Trotskyism
- Political position: Far-left
- International affiliation: League for the Fifth International (2007-2020)
- Local Government: 1 / 7,842

Election symbol
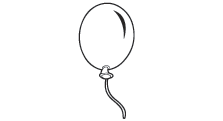
- Balloon

The Socialist Party of Sri Lanka (SP) was a left-wing political party in Sri Lanka. Founded in 2006 as a split from the United Socialist Party (part of the Committee for a Workers' International), it was for a time associated with the League for the Fifth International (L5I) until its expulsion in 2020 over a disagreement around electoral tactics. In its decision to expel the SPSL from the L5I, the International Secretariat of the League noted that "The reason for the expulsion was its support for a candidate, Dr Ajantha Perera, in the Presidential election of 16 November 2019, whose campaign systematically misrepresented the politics of the League and whose public statements were neither socialist nor working class, even in the broadest sense."

The party has members in several unions, including a health union.

Popular environmentalist and social activist Ajantha Perera was nominated as the party's presidential candidate for the 2019 Sri Lankan presidential election. She also became the only female presidential candidate to contest the 2019 elections and the first such instance since 1999. She later defected to the centre-right United National Party.

== Electoral history ==
Local Government
Election year	Election	Votes	Vote %	Result / Remarks
2018	Local	1,522	0.01%	1,522 / 12,372,816

Presidential
Election year	Candidate	Votes	Vote %	Result
2019	Ajantha Perera	27,572	0.21%	Lost

== See also ==
- Sri Lanka leftist parties
