= Jerusalem riots of 66 =

Riots in the religious centre of Roman Judea

- Location: Jerusalem, Roman Judea
- Date: 66 CE
- Target: Roman and Greek residents of Jerusalem
- Deaths: 6,000
- Perpetrator: Jewish mobs
- Motive: Religious and nationalistic tensions

Jerusalem riots of 66 refer to the massive unrest in the center of Roman Judea, which became the catalyst of the First Jewish–Roman War.

== Timeline ==
According to Josephus, the violence of the year 66 initially began at Caesarea, provoked by Greeks of a certain merchant house sacrificing birds in front of a local synagogue. The Roman garrison did not intervene there and thus the long-standing Hellenistic and Jewish religious tensions took a downward spiral. In reaction, one of the Jewish Temple clerks Eleazar ben Hanania ceased prayers and sacrifices for the Roman emperor at the Temple.

Protests over taxation joined the list of grievances and random attacks on Roman citizens and perceived 'traitors' occurred in Jerusalem. Tension reached a breaking point when Roman governor Gessius Florus sent Roman troops to remove seventeen talents from the Temple treasury, claiming the money was for unpaid taxes.

In response to this action, the city of Jerusalem fell into unrest and some of the Jewish population began to openly mock Florus by passing a basket around to collect money as if Florus was poor. Rioters even attacked a garrison, killing the soldiers. When a Syrian governor tried to intervene, he failed to improve the situation. Florus reacted to the unrest by sending soldiers into Jerusalem the next day to raid the city and arrest a number of the city leaders, who were later whipped and crucified, despite many of them being Roman citizens.

== Aftermath ==
Shortly, outraged Judean nationalist factions took up arms and the Roman military garrison of Jerusalem was quickly overrun by rebels. In September 66, the Romans in Jerusalem surrendered and were lynched. Meanwhile, the Greek inhabitants of the capital of Judaea, Caesarea, attacked their Jewish neighbors; the Jews replied in kind, expelling many Greeks from Judaea, Galilee and the Golan heights. Fearing the worst, the pro-Roman king Agrippa II and his sister Berenice fled Jerusalem to Galilee. Judean militias later moved upon Roman citizens of Judaea and pro-Roman officials, cleansing the country of any Roman symbols.

== See also ==
- List of massacres in Jerusalem
- Zealots
