= V. S. Kumar Anandan =

Sri Lankan attorney and Guinness World Records holder

V.S. Kumar Anandan
- Born: Sri Lanka
- Died: 6 August 1984; English Channel
- Other name: alikkumaran aanathan
- Education: University of London
- Occupations: Attorney, Guinness World Records holder.
- Spouse: Manel Anandan

V.S. Kumar Anandan was a Guinness World Records holder. His one of many records include Swimming the Palk Strait, from Sri Lanka to India and back in 51 hours, in the year 1971. Once he met with a motor vehicle accident and was hospitalized for six months. While attempting to swim the English Channel on 6 August 1984 he collapsed and died due to heavy currents. Kumar Anandan held the maximum number of Individual Guinness Records at a point in time which included Non-Stop Water treading (80 hours at Chennai), Standing on one leg for 33 hours, Non-Stop dancing, Ball punching for 136 hours, etc. He was used to call by his nick name "Aalikkadal Anandan"

He was from Valvettithurai, Jaffna District, Sri Lanka (then known as Ceylon). He had a successful educational career, he was a graduate of University of London. He also obtained the Bachelor of Laws degree in Sri Lanka and was an Attorney at Law by profession.

== See also ==
- Guinness World Records
