= M. K. Shivajilingam =

Sri Lankan politician (1956/1957–2026)

Hon. M. K. Shivajilingam MP MPC
- ம. க. சிவாஜிலிங்கம்
- Shivajilingam at the International Day of the Disappeared protest in 2014

Member of Parliament for Jaffna District
- In office 2001–2010

Member of the Northern Provincial Council for Jaffna District
- In office 2013–2018

Chairman of Valvettithurai Urban Council
- In office 2025–2026

Personal details
- Born: 1956 or 1957 Valvettithurai, Dominion of Ceylon
- Died: 14 November 2026 (aged 69) Valvettithurai, Sri Lanka
- Party: Tamil People's National Alliance (2020–2026); Tamil National Party (2020–2026)
- Other political affiliations: Tamil Eelam Liberation Organization (until 2010, 2011–2020); Tamil National Alliance (2001–2010, 2011–2020); Tamil National Liberation Alliance (2010–2011)
- Profession: Politician

Mahalingam Kanagalingam Shivajilingam (Tamil: மகாலிங்கம் கனகலிங்கம் சிவாஜிலிங்கம்; 1956 or 1957 – 14 November 2026) was a Sri Lankan Tamil politician, provincial councillor, and Member of Parliament.

At the time of his death, Shivajilingam was serving as the chairman of the Valvettithurai Urban Council.

== Background ==
Shivajilingam was born in Valvettithurai in northern Sri Lanka. He was a distant relative of Velupillai Prabhakaran, founder and leader of the militant Liberation Tigers of Tamil Eelam.

== Career ==
Shivajilingam was a member of the Tamil Eelam Liberation Organization (TELO). He served as chairman of the Valvettithurai Urban Council.

On 20 October 2001, TELO joined with the All Ceylon Tamil Congress, Eelam People's Revolutionary Liberation Front, and Tamil United Liberation Front to form the Tamil National Alliance (TNA). Shivajilingam was one of the TNA's candidates in the Jaffna District at the 2001 parliamentary election. He was elected and entered Parliament of Sri Lanka. He was re-elected at the 2004 parliamentary election.

He contested the 2010 presidential election as an independent candidate. He came ninth after securing 9,662 votes (0.09%). In 2010, Shivajilingam left TELO and TNA. He subsequently formed the Tamil National Liberation Alliance (TNLA) with other dissident members of the TNA. Shivajilingam was one of the LLF/TNLA alliance's candidates in the Jaffna District at the 2010 parliamentary election but the alliance failed to win any seats in Parliament. In June 2011, TNLA was dissolved and Shivajilingam rejoined TELO and TNA.

Shivajilingam contested the 2011 local elections as a TNA candidate and was re-elected to the Valvettithurai Urban Council. He contested the 2013 provincial council election as one of the TNA's candidates in the Jaffna District and was elected to the Northern Provincial Council. After the election, he was appointed to assist the Chief Minister on employment. He took his oath as provincial councillor in front of Justice of Peace Mayilerum Perumal at a beach side Hindu temple in Mullivaikkal on 14 October 2013.

He contested the 2015 parliamentary election as part of an independent group in the Kurunegala District but the group failed to win any seats in Parliament.

Shivajilingam was considered a maverick in Sri Lankan Tamil politics and was for many years the only prominent Tamil politician to openly call for an independent international investigation into alleged war crimes during the Sri Lankan civil war. He has openly called for former president Mahinda Rajapaksa and former commander of the army Sarath Fonseka to be tried for war crimes at the International Criminal Court.

Shivajilingam claimed that the Sri Lankan military, the Eelam People's Democratic Party and the LTTE had attempted to assassinate him on a number of occasions. In November 2012, during a Canadian refugee hearing, Captain Ravindra Watudura Bandanage of the Sri Lankan Army claimed that an army colonel had ordered him to place bombs at the home of Shivajilingam.

== Illness and death ==
Shivajilingam underwent a kidney transplant in June 2026. His health declined in October and he was admitted to a hospital in Jaffna. He was hospitalised again in November and died on 14 November, at the age of 69, at his residence in Valvettithurai, Sri Lanka.

== Electoral history ==
Electoral history of M. K. Shivajilingam
Election	Constituency	Party	Alliance	Votes	Result
2001 parliamentary	Jaffna District	TELO	TNA	17,859	Elected
2004 parliamentary	Jaffna District	TELO	TNA	42,193	Elected
2010 presidential	Sri Lanka	Ind		9,662	Not elected
2010 parliamentary	Jaffna District		TNLA/LLF		Not elected
2011 local	Valvettithurai UC	TELO	TNA	1,165	Elected
2013 provincial	Jaffna District	TELO	TNA	22,660	Elected
2015 parliamentary	Kurunegala District	Ind			Not elected
2019 presidential	Sri Lanka	Ind		12,256	Not elected
2020 parliamentary	Jaffna District	TTK	TPNA		Not elected
