= Gunapala Tissakuttiarachchi =

Sri Lankan politician (born 1954)

Hon. Gunapala Tissakuttiarachchi

Personal details
- Born: 15 December 1954 (age 71)
- Party: United National Party
- Occupation: Politics

Gunapala Tissakuttiarachchi (ගුණපාල තිස්සකුට්ටිආරච්චි; born 15 December 1954) was a Member of Parliament for Hambantota district from 1989 to 1994 and State Minister of Environment & Parliamentary Affairs from 1989 to 1994, Tissakuttiarachchi has held several posts including Chairman of Multi Purpose Co-operative Society Tissamaharama from 1977 to 1981, Chairman of State Printing Corporation from 1999 to 2001, Consultant of Consumer Affairs Authority from 2004 to 2005 and Working Director of Employees’ Trust Fund Board (ETF) from 2005 to 2015. He holds a Mass Communication Degree (Special) University of Kelaniya.
