= N. Srikantha =

Sri Lankan Tamil lawyer, politician and former Member of Parliament

Hon. N. Srikantha MP
- ந.ஶ்ரீகாந்தா

Member of Parliament for Jaffna District
- In office 2006–2010
- Preceded by: Nadarajah Raviraj

Personal details
- Party: Tamil Eelam Liberation Organization
- Other political affiliations: Tamil National Alliance
- Profession: Lawyer

Kanthar Nallathamby Srikantha is a Sri Lankan Tamil lawyer, politician and former Member of Parliament.

== Career ==
Srikantha is an attorney-at-law. He is a member of Tamil Eelam Liberation Organization (TELO) and entered politics in the mid-1980s.

Srikantha was one of the ENDLF/EPRLF/TELO/TULF alliance's candidates in Jaffna District at the 1989 parliamentary election but failed to get elected after coming eighth amongst the alliance candidates.

On 20 October 2001 the All Ceylon Tamil Congress, Eelam People's Revolutionary Liberation Front, TELO and Tamil United Liberation Front formed the Tamil National Alliance (TNA). Srikantha was one of the TNA's candidates in Trincomalee District at the 2001 parliamentary election but failed to get re-elected. He was one of the TNA's candidates in Jaffna District at the 2004 parliamentary election but again failed to get re-elected, coming ninth amongst the TNA candidates. However, he entered Parliament in 2006 following the assassination of Nadarajah Raviraj on 10 November 2006.

In 2010 Srikantha left TELO and TNA. He subsequently formed the Tamil National Liberation Alliance (TNLA) with other dissident members of the TNA. Srikantha was one of the LLF/TNLA alliance's candidates in Jaffna District at the 2010 parliamentary election but the alliance failed to win any seats in Parliament. In June 2011 TNLA was dissolved and Srikantha rejoined TELO and TNA.

Srikantha contested the 2015 parliamentary election as one of the TNA's candidates in Jaffna District but failed get re-elected.

== Electoral history ==
Electoral history of N. Srikantha
Election	Constituency	Party	Votes	Result
1989 parliamentary	Jaffna District	TELO	5,825	Not elected
2001 parliamentary	Trincomalee District	TNA		Not elected
2004 parliamentary	Jaffna District	TNA	33,210	Not elected
2010 parliamentary	Jaffna District	TNLA		Not elected
2015 parliamentary	Jaffna District	TNA		Not elected
