= VVT (gang) =

- Founding location: Rexdale, Milliken District Park, Toronto, Ontario, Canada
- Territory: Greater Toronto Area Mississauga, Hamilton, Waterloo, Ottawa,Montreal, London, United Kingdom
- Ethnicity: Tamils
- Criminal activities: Extortion, arms trafficking, fraud, drug trafficking

VVT was a Canadian Tamil street gang originating in Toronto believed to be named after the town of Valvettithurai in northern Sri Lanka.

VVT was founded in the early 1990s by Sri Lankan Tamil immigrants, who had fled because of the country's civil war, and had a presence in the west end of Toronto (in particular in Etobicoke and certain areas in Old Toronto and East York) and was regarded as being very business savvy. The VVT were alleged to have members ranging in age from their early teenage years to men in their 30s, and with membership between 100 and 1000. In the mid 1990s to early 2000s, the VVT had an ongoing war with another Tamil gang called the AK Aannan based out of Scarborough. There was a brief truce in 1998 after community members brokered a peace deal in a Richmond Hill Hindu temple; however, a murder a year later renewed the fighting. VVT is behind many murders in the 1990s.

Even after the deportation of some prominent members, authorities believe this gang is still in operation through its younger generation. Police alleged VVT members were involved in drug trafficking, fraud, weapons trafficking, counterfeiting, and extortion. The gang is now considered largely inactive.
