= Valvettithurai =

Valvettithurai வல்வெட்டித்துறை වල්වෙට්ටිතුරෙයි
- Town
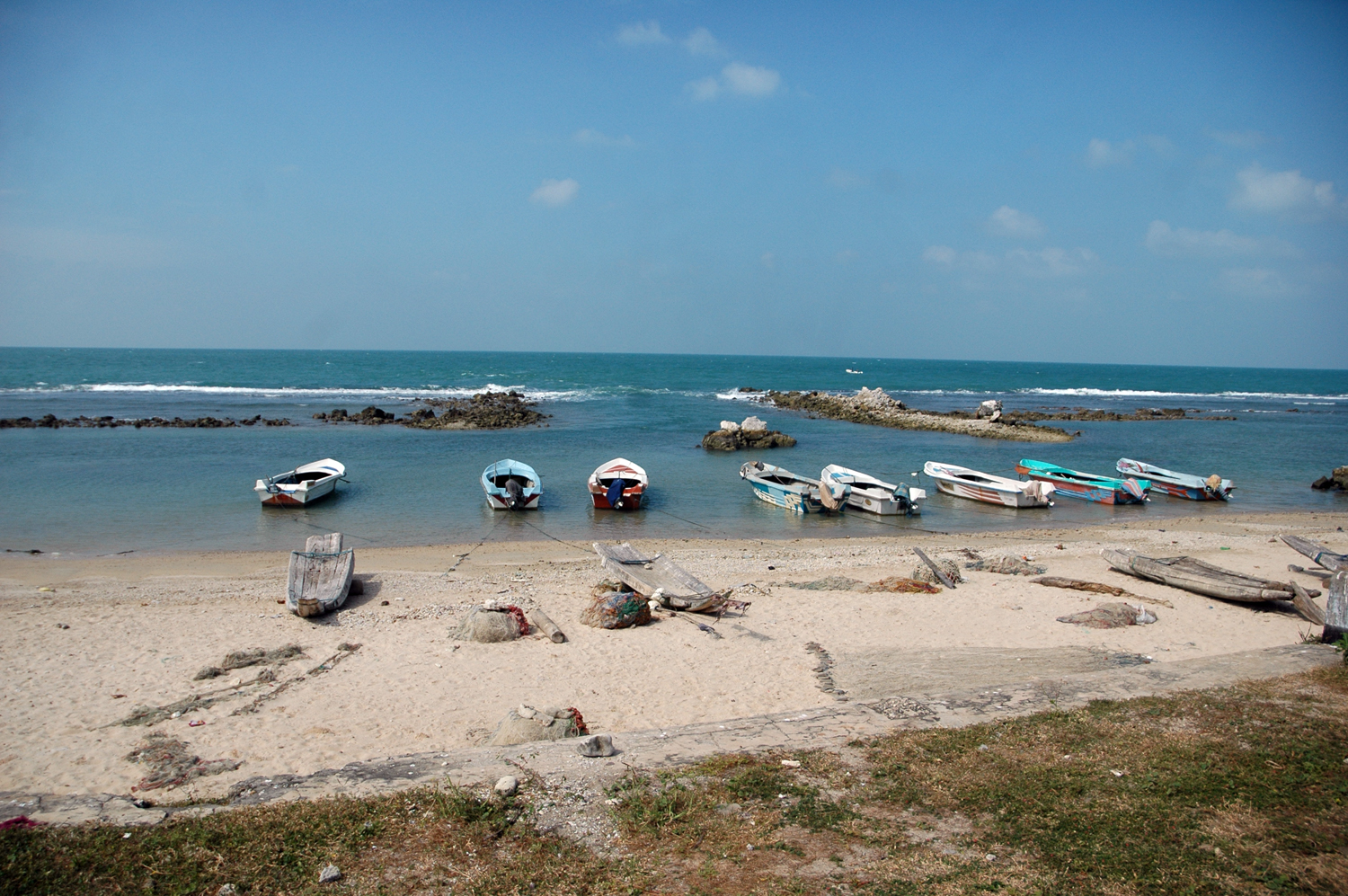
- Fishing boats at the shoreline

- Location within Northern Province
- Coordinates: 9°49′0″N 80°10′0″E
- Country: Sri Lanka
- Province: Northern
- District: Jaffna
- DS Division: Vadamarachchi North

Government
  - Type: Urban Council
  - Chairman: Nadarajah Anantharaj (TNA)

Area
  - Total: 4.85 km^{2} (1.87 sq mi)

Population (2007)
  - Total: 18,000
  - Density: 3,711/km^{2} (9,610/sq mi)
- Time zone: UTC+5:30 (Sri Lanka Standard Time Zone)
- Post code: 40540

Valvettithurai (Tamil: வல்வெட்டித்துறை, romanized: Valveṭṭittuṟai; Sinhala: වල්වෙට්ටිතුරෙයි, romanized: Valveṭṭitureyi), sometimes shortened as VVT or Valvai, is a coastal town of Jaffna District on the northeast coast of the Jaffna Peninsula in Northern Province, Sri Lanka governed by an Urban Council of the same name. Valvettithurai was historically known for its seafaring traditions and olden transnational shipping trade.

The town is popularly known for being the birthplace of Velupillai Prabhakaran, the head of the Liberation Tigers of Tamil Eelam or the Tamil Tigers, a separatist group that waged a war for an independent state in the North and East. Valvettithurai is also the place of birth, of the leaders of the Tamil Eelam Liberation Organization, Kuttimani and Nadarajah Thangathurai, the founding fathers of the Tamil Eelam armed struggle.

== Etymology ==
Valvettithurai in Tamil could mean "The port of the expanse of forest land/scrub jungle" or "The port of the raised stretch of open land". The word Valvettithurai seems to have been derived from the combination of Tamil words Vallai meaning a big forest or a raised stretch of land, Vedi which means expanse or open space, and Thurai which refers to seaport.

== History ==
According to folk etymology, was the foundation of the village laid by a Maravar chieftain known as Valliathevan, who was given the land by the founder of the Jaffna Kingdom. The clans of the Maravars of southern Tamil Nadu and the Karaiyars of Valvetthithurai have long had coastal military alliances through trade and marriage. Both clans have long engaged in seatrade, with Valvettithurai being a prominent seaport in the northern Jaffna region.

The coastal clans of Valvettithurai were involved in warfare. The coastal chiefs of Valvettithurai fought under the leadership of Migapulle Arachchi and fought on the side of Jaffna king Cankili II in the Portuguese conquest of the Jaffna kingdom.

The population of the coastal town are predominantly Shaivites. The Kadalodiekal own the major temples such as the famous Vaitheeswaran Sivan kovil. The Kadalodikal (Tamil name for mariners) of Valvettithurai, the wealthier clan of the Karaiyars were specifically involved in the seatrade between Jaffna region and the Coromandel Coast, including up to the coasts of Myanmar. The Japanese occupation of Burma, hindered the seatrade of the Kadalodiekal. Their situation was deteriorated with the colonial independence of Sri Lanka, and many of the Kadalodiekal got engaged in large-scale smuggling between Sri Lanka and India. The town also produced the renowned brigantine known locally as Annapoorani Ammal. This native vessel known as a thoni, built with a blend of Jaffna and European tradition, sailed from Valvettithurai to Gloucester in Massachusetts of United States in 1937. Built in 1930 by native traditional shipwrighters for the purpose of serving as a cargo ship in the Indian rice trade, the vessel was bought by an American known as William C. Robinson. Robinson, changing the name of the ship to Florence C. Robinson (after his wife), sailed to the U.S. with a crew of six natives from Valvettithurai including their Thandayal (Tamil for sea captain) known as Kanagaratnam Thambapillai.

As an effect of the 1958 anti-Tamil pogroms, several students from Valvettithurai formed organisations based on Sri Lankan Tamil nationalism, such as the Tamil Eelam Liberation Organization (TELO), founded by Kuttimani and Thangadurai of Valvettithurai. One of the earliest members of this organisation was Velupillai Prabhakaran of Valvettithurai, who later became the leader and founder of Liberation Tigers of Tamil Eelam (LTTE). Several chief commanders of the LTTE, such as Kittu, Radha, and Baby Subramaniam, were natives of Valvettithurai.

The town had been severely affected by the country's civil war with a number of forced disappearances and attacks against local civilians by the Sri Lankan military. It was the site of two brutal massacres of local Tamil civilians by occupying armies. In 1985 the Sri Lankan military rounded local people up into the library and blew up the building. In 1989 the Indian army rounded up people into the village square and opened fire on them, as well as people in shops and their homes.

== Geography ==
Valvettithuri is a coastal town bounded by the Indian Ocean to its north. It is situated at the tip of the northern province and is considered as a place of strategic importance due to the presence of the Palk Strait and its close proximity to the coast of the Indian state of Tamil Nadu. The northern coast of the island was severely impacted by the 2004 Indian Ocean tsunami which claimed several thousand lives.

It is also flourished by the Thondamannar lagoon which meets the sea through a long, narrow channel to the west of the town. The lagoon's water is brackish to saline. The lagoon has extensive mudflats, seagrass beds and mangrove swamps, particularly Avicennia. The lagoon attracts a wide variety of water birds including American Flamingoes, ducks, gulls, terns and other shorebirds.

There exists a barrage and bridge on the Highway preventing sea water from entering into the Thondamannar lagoon which is the primary source of drinking water for the locals. Across the bridge, to the west of the town, lie the towns of Paalai and Kankesanturai, much of whose lands have been seized under the Sri Lankan military's High Security Zone (HSZ). To the eastern end of the town, is the town of Paruthithurai or Point Pedro, the northernmost point of the island.

=== Climate ===
The temperature varies from 25 to 34 °C. The town experiences a moderate climate in September–January. It receives much of its rainfall during the North East monsoon between October and December. Being a coastal town, the weather is also influenced by cyclones and tropical currents.

Climate data for Valvettithurai, Jaffna district
Month	Jan	Feb	Mar	Apr	May	Jun	Jul	Aug	Sep	Oct	Nov	Dec	Year
Daily mean °C (°F)	25 (77)	26 (79)	28 (82)	29 (84)	29 (84)	28 (82)	28 (82)	28 (82)	28 (82)	27 (81)	25 (77)	24 (75)	27 (81)
Average precipitation mm (inches)	70 (2.8)	30 (1.2)	20 (0.8)	50 (2.0)	40 (1.6)	10 (0.4)	20 (0.8)	30 (1.2)	60 (2.4)	230 (9.1)	380 (15.0)	260 (10.2)	1,270 (50.0)
Source: Weatherbase

== Demographics ==
The population is mainly Sri Lankan Tamils of Hindu or Catholic faith. The main industry is farming, fishing and trading. The mouth of the Thondamannar lagoon has the popular Hindu temple dedicated to Lord Murugan called Selva Sannithy.

The population of the town, as of 2007 stood at 18,000 and bears a high population density of 3711 persons per square km.

== Education ==
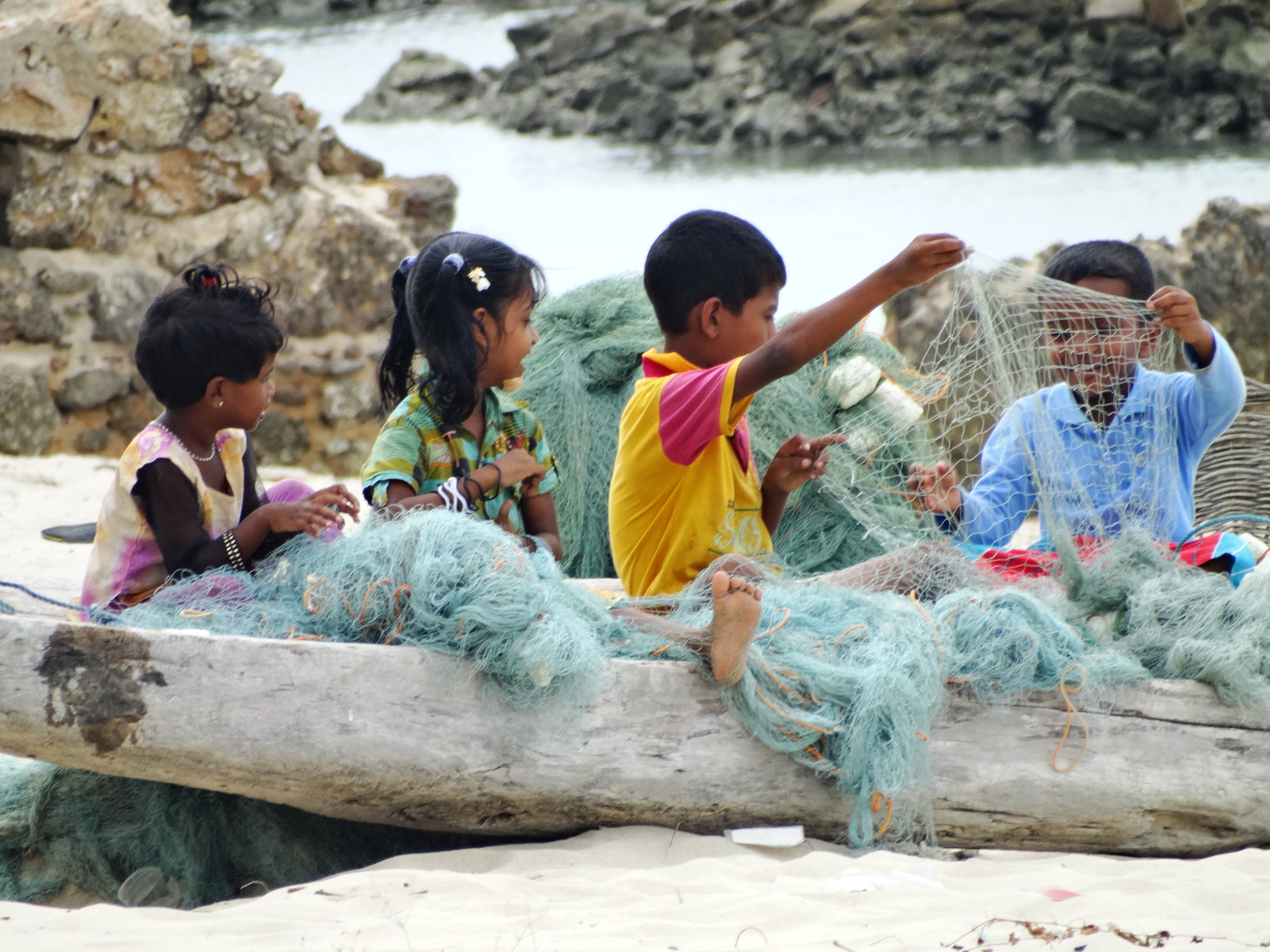
Children of Valvettithurai

The Valvai Chithamabara College is the major higher educational institution in Valvettithurai. The town is the home to several primary schools:

No	Name of School
1.	Thondamannaru Veerakaththippillai Maha Vidyalayam
2.	Valvai Sivakuru Vidthyasalai
3.	Valvir Mahalir Maha Vidyalayam
4.	Valvai Roman Catholic Tamil Mixed School
5.	Valvai American Mixed School
6.	Polikandy Hindu Tamil Mixed School
7.	Kamparmalai Vidyalayam
8.	Valvetty Hindu Tamil Mixed School

The town also houses a good number of public libraries.

== Notable people ==
- Velupillai Prabhakaran, founder and head of the separatist group Liberation Tigers of Tamil Eelam (LTTE)
- Kuttimani, a member of the parliament, founder and leader of Tamil Eelam Liberation Organization (TELO)
- Nadarajah Thangathurai, co-founder and leader of the TELO.
- Gnanamoorthy, co-founder of the Tamil United Liberation Front, a Tamil political party in the island.
- Navaratnaswamy, the first person to swim across the Palk Strait, to Point Calimere in the Tamil Nadu coast from Valvettithurai.
- V. S. Kumar Anandan, the first person to swim from Valvettithurai - Sri Lanka to India and back. A Guinness World Records holder who held the maximum number of Individual Guinness Records at a point.
- M. K. Shivajilingam, former member of parliament in Sri Lanka
- Vijay Thanigasalam, Ontario associate minister of housing and the member of Provincial Parliament

== See also ==
- 1985 Valvettithurai massacre
- 1989 Valvettithurai massacre
- VVT (gang)
