= 1985 Valvettiturai massacre =

Massacre in Sri Lanka

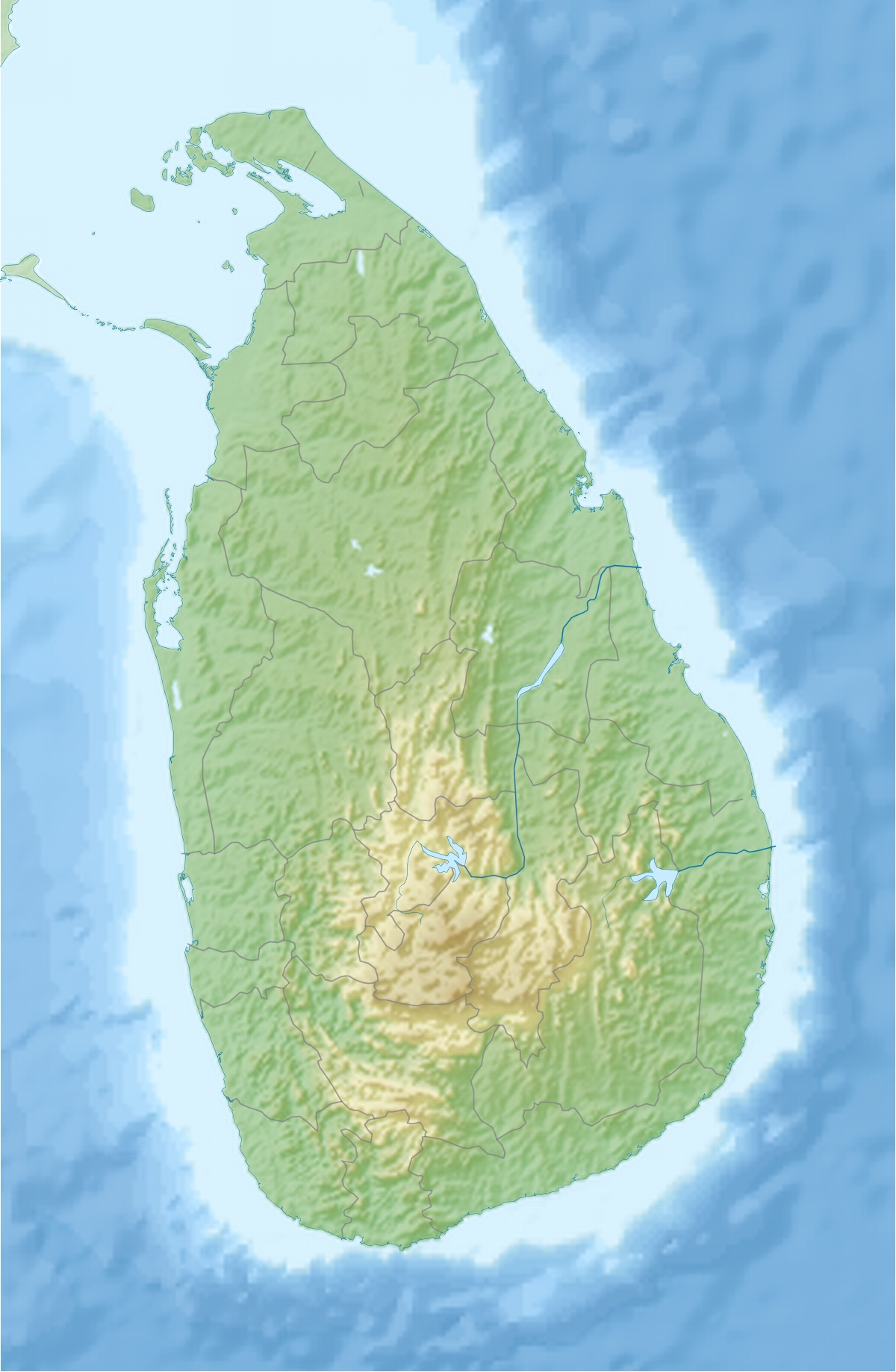
- Location: 9°49′N 80°10′E; Valvettiturai, Sri Lanka
- Date: 12 May 1985
- Target: Mostly the Sri Lankan Tamil civilians
- Deaths: 70
- Perpetrator: Sri Lanka Army

The 1985 Valvettiturai massacre happened on May 12, 1985 after 2 landmine attacks killed 10 soldiers and an officer in Valvettiturai. 70 minority Sri Lankan Tamil civilians from the town of Valvettithurai (abbreviated as VVT), Sri Lanka were rounded up. They were asked to go inside the town library and then the library was blown up by the Sri Lankan Army, killing all of them. The LTTE would later apparently retaliate in Anuradhapura. In the ensuing weeks dozens more Tamil civilians were also killed.

== See also ==
- List of attacks on civilians attributed to Sri Lankan government forces
