= List of massacres in Jamaica =

A list of massacres that have occurred in Jamaica:

Name	Date	Location	Deaths	Notes
Baptist War executions	December 1831–1832	Colony of Jamaica	312+	Mass executions following the failed slave rebellion in British–controlled Jamaica.
Lima massacre	January 1832	Lima, Saint James Parish	200	200 unarmed slaves including men, women and children were killed following the 1831–1832 Christmas Rebellion in the Baptist War in Lima Square near Adelphi in Saint James Parish.
Morant Bay massacre	October 1865	St. Thomas in the East	439	439 Black Jamaicans were executed following an attempted rebellion, 85 without trial.
Coral Gardens incident	April 11-13, 1963	Across the country	8	Mass arrest of Rastafari members.
Green Bay Massacre	January 5, 1978	Green Bay firing range, Port Henderson, Jamaica	5	Politically motivated.
Cherry Tree Lane massacre	August 11, 2024	Cherry Tree Lane,Clarendon Parish	8	8 were killed in two shootings in Cherry Tree Lane by gang members.
