= Vadamarachchi Lagoon =

Vadamarachchi lagoon
- வடமராட்சி கடல்நீரேரி (Tamil)
- Location within Northern Province Location within Sri Lanka
- Location: Jaffna District, Sri Lanka
- Coordinates: 9°42′N 80°18′E
- Type: Lagoon
- Primary outflows: Indian Ocean
- Surface area: 77.87 square kilometres (30.07 sq mi)
- Max. depth: 2 metres (6.6 ft)
- Surface elevation: Sea level

Vadamarachchi lagoon (Tamil: வடமராட்சி கடல்நீரேரி) is a lagoon in Jaffna District, northern Sri Lanka. The lagoon is sometimes referred to as Thondamannar lagoon. The lagoon separates the Vadamarachchi region from the Valikamam and Thenmarachchi regions.

The lagoon is connected to the Indian Ocean by a narrow channel to the north, near the town of Thondamannar. The lagoon's water is brackish to saline. There is a sluice gate at Thondamannar to prevent sea water entering the lagoon.

The lagoon is surrounded by a densely populated region containing palmyra palms, coconut palm, grassland, rice paddies, arid scrubland, and open forest.

The Vadamarachchi lagoon has extensive mudflats, seagrass beds and mangrove swamps, particularly Avicennia. The lagoon attracts a wide variety of water birds including American flamingoes, ducks, gulls, terns and other shorebirds.
