= Massacre =

Incident of killing civilians

A massacre is an event of killing defenseless human beings or animals. It is generally used to describe a targeted mass killing of civilians by an armed group. It can also be used figuratively to refer to a one-sided exchange between armed groups. The word is a loan of a French term for "butchery" or "carnage". Other terms with overlapping scope include war crime, pogrom, mass killing, mass murder, and extrajudicial killing.

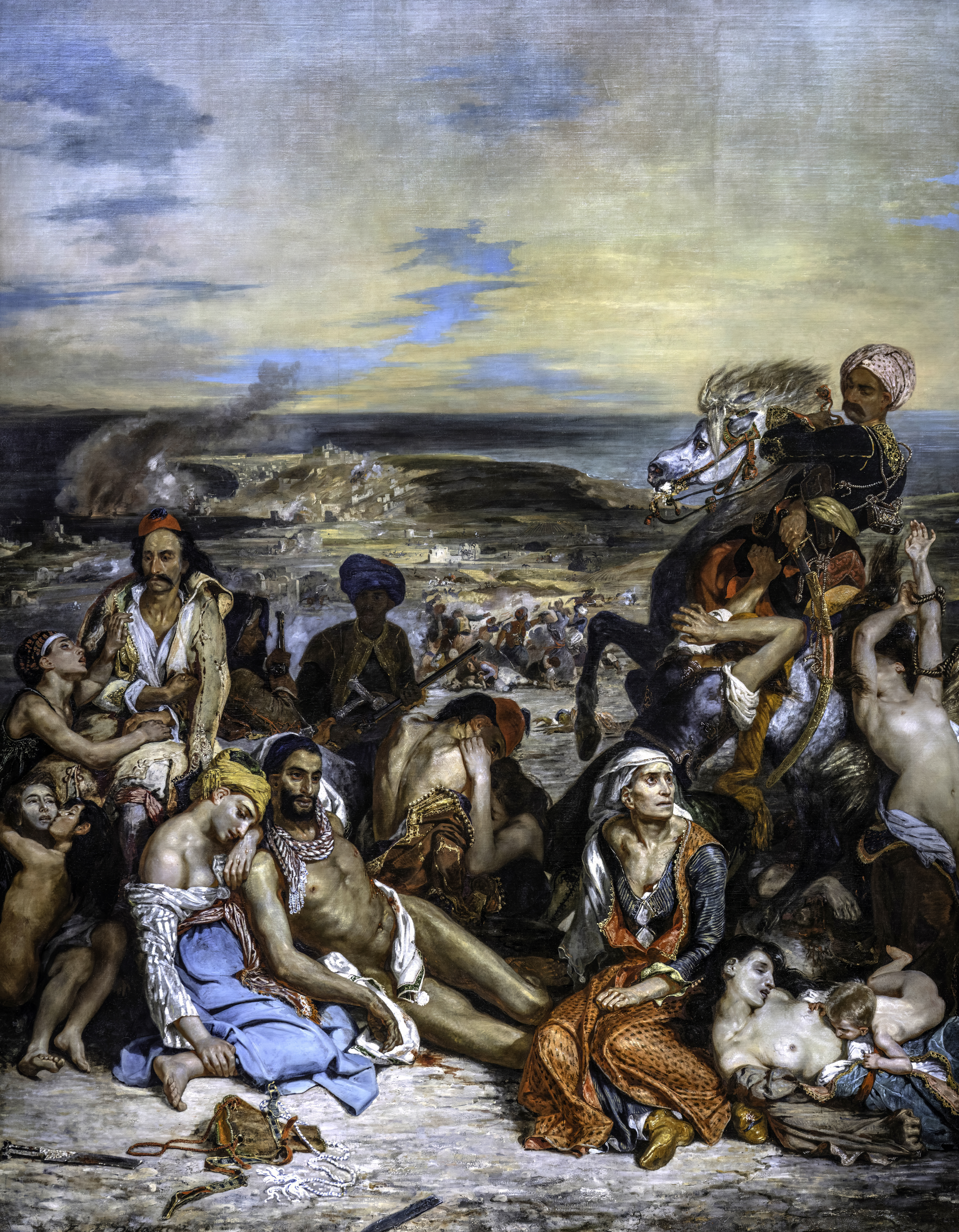
The Chios massacre committed by Ottoman forces against Greek civilians during the Greek War for Independence

== Etymology ==
Massacre derives from late 16th century Middle French word macacre meaning "slaughterhouse" or "butchery". Further origins are dubious, though the word may be related to Latin macellum "provisions store, butcher shop".

The Middle French word macecr "butchery, carnage" is first recorded in the late 11th century. Its primary use remained the context of animal slaughter (in hunting terminology referring to the head of a stag) well into the 18th century. The use of macecre "butchery" of the mass killing of people dates to the 12th century, implying people being "slaughtered like animals". The term did not necessarily imply a multitude of victims, e.g. Fénelon in Dialogue des Morts (1712) uses l'horride massacre de Blois ("the horrid massacre at [the chateau of] Blois") of the assassination of Henry I, Duke of Guise (1588), while Boileau, Satires XI (1698) has L'Europe fut un champ de massacre et d'horreur "Europe was a field of massacre and horror" of the European wars of religion.

The French word was loaned into English in the 1580s, specifically in the sense "indiscriminate slaughter of a large number of people". It is used in reference to the St. Bartholomew's Day massacre in The Massacre at Paris by Christopher Marlowe. The term is again used in 1695 for the Sicilian Vespers of 1281, called "that famous Massacre of the French in Sicily" in the English translation of De quattuor monarchiis by Johannes Sleidanus (1556), translating illa memorabilis Gallorum clades per Siciliam, i.e. massacre is here used as the translation of Latin clades "hammering, breaking; destruction".

The term's use in historiography was popularized by Gibbon's History of the Decline and Fall of the Roman Empire (1781–1789), which used e.g. "massacre of the Latins" for the killing of Roman Catholics in Constantinople in 1182. The Åbo Bloodbath has also been described as a kind of massacre; this was a mass punishment carried out on the Old Great Square in Turku on November 10, 1599, in which 14 opponents of the Duke Charles (later King Charles IX) in Finland were decapitated; in the Battle between Duke Charles and Sigismund, Duke Charles defeated King Sigismund's troops in the Battle of Stångebro in Sweden in 1598 and then made an expedition to Finland, where he defeated the resistance during the Cudgel War and executed the estates in Turku without consulting Finland's leading nobles.

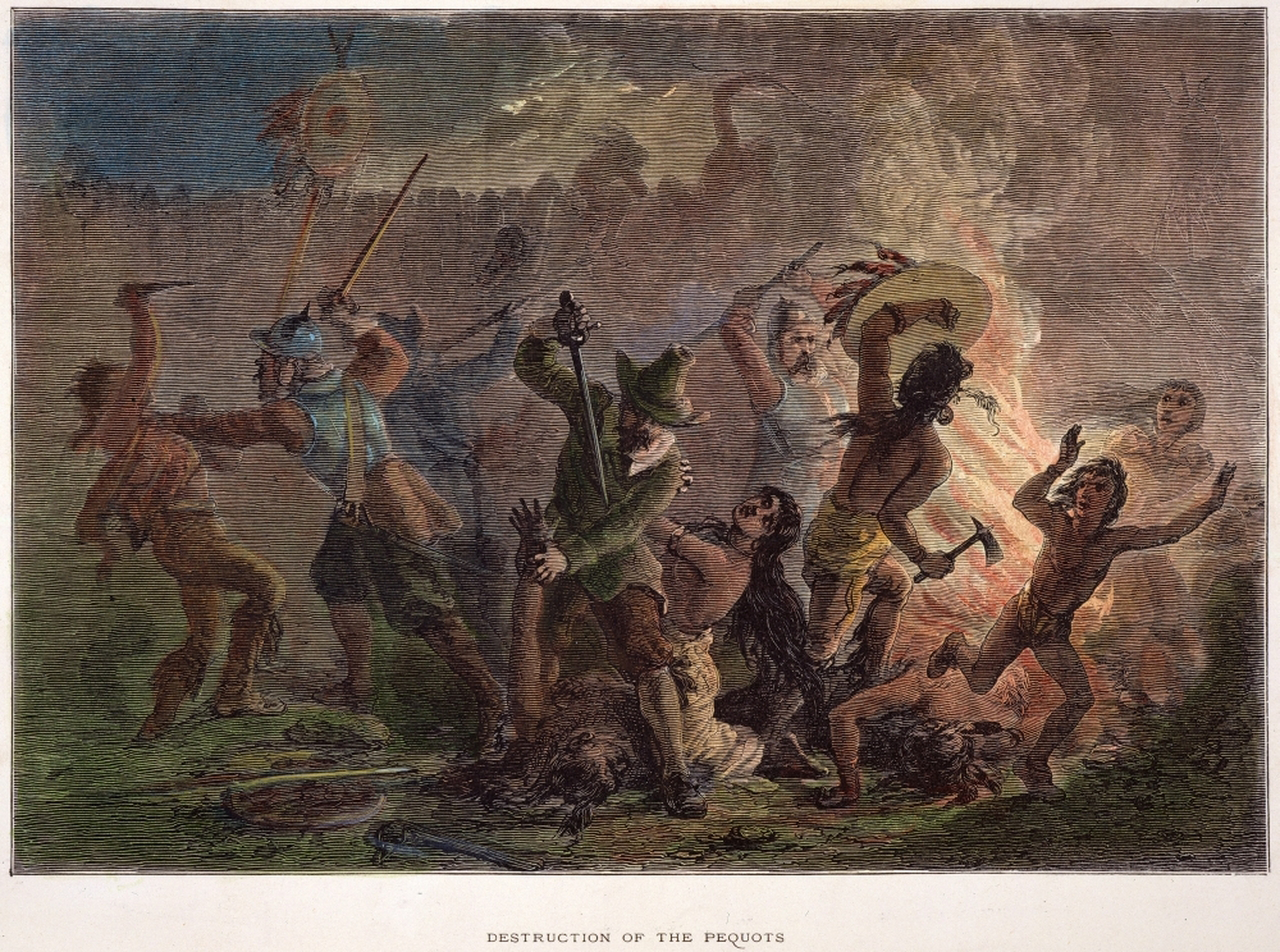
The Mystic massacre against the Pequot people perpetrated by settler colonial forces during the Pequot War

An early use in the propagandistic portrayal of current events was the "Boston Massacre" of 1770, which was employed to build support for the American Revolution. A pamphlet with the title A short narrative of the horrid massacre in Boston, perpetrated in the evening of the fifth day of March, 1770, by soldiers of the 29th regiment was printed in Boston still in 1770. (Note: The shortened name "Boston massacre" was in use by the early 1800s(Austin 1803, p. 314) The term "Massacre Day" for the annual remembrance held during 1771–1783 dates to the late 19th century.(De Grasse Stevens 1888, p. 126) The 1772 "Massacre Day of Oration" by Joseph Warren was originally titled An Oration Delivered March 5th, 1772. At the Request of the Inhabitants of the Town of Boston; to Commemorate the Bloody Tragedy of the Fifth of March, 1770.) Massacre began to see inflationary use in journalism in the first half of the 20th century. By the 1970s, it could also be used purely metaphorically, referring to events that do not involve deaths, such as the Saturday Night Massacre—the dismissals and resignations of political appointees during the Watergate scandal involving Richard Nixon.

== Definitions ==
The Oxford English Dictionary defines Massacre as "The indiscriminate and brutal slaughter of people or (less commonly) animals; carnage, butchery, slaughter in numbers; an instance of this", while Merriam-Webster defines it as " the act or an instance of killing a number of usually helpless or unresisting human beings under circumstances of atrocity or cruelty".

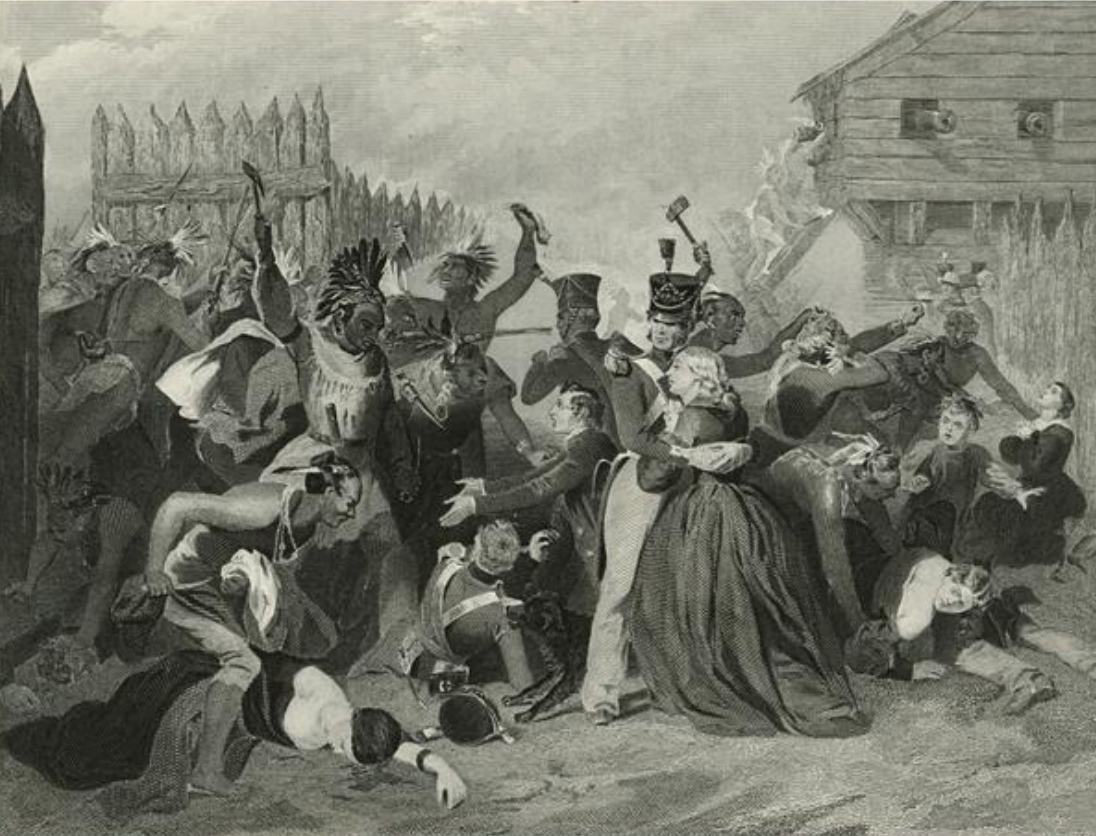
The Fort Mims massacre committed by Red Stick forces during the Creek War

Robert Melson (1982) in the context of the "Hamidian massacres" used a "basic working definition" of "by massacre we shall mean the intentional killing by political actors of a significant number of relatively defenseless people... the motives for massacre need not be rational in order for the killings to be intentional... Mass killings can be carried out for various reasons, including a response to false rumors... political massacre... should be distinguished from criminal or pathological mass killings... as political bodies we of course include the state and its agencies, but also nonstate actors..."

Similarly, Levene (1999) attempts an objective classification of "massacres" throughout history, taking the term to refer to killings carried out by groups using overwhelming force against defenseless victims. He is excepting certain cases of mass executions, requiring that massacres must have the quality of being morally unacceptable. (Note: "Although it is not possible to set unalterable rules about when multiple murders become massacres. Equally important is the fact that massacres are not carried out by individuals, instead they are carried out by groups... the use of superior, even overwhelming force..." Levene excludes "legal, or even some quasi-legal, mass executions". He also points out that it is "...most often ... when the act is outside the normal moral bounds of the society witnessing it... In any war ... this killing is often acceptable."(Levene & Roberts 1999, p. 90)) The term "fractal massacre" has been used to refer to two different types of event:

- the fracturing of Aboriginal tribes by killing more than 30% of the tribe on one of their hunting missions, and
- many small killings adding up to a larger genocide.

== See also ==
- Democide
- Ethnic cleansing
- List of lists of massacres by country
