= List of political parties in Sri Lanka =

This article lists political parties in Sri Lanka.

Sri Lanka has a multi-party political system. Starting from the early 1950s, Sri Lankan politics was mostly dominated by two political parties and their respective coalitions:

- the centre-left social democratic Sri Lanka Freedom Party
- the centre-right liberal conservative United National Party

Recently, however, the influence of the two parties has diminished significantly. In 2016, the right-wing populist Sri Lanka Podujana Peramuna led by former president Mahinda Rajapaksa split from the SLFP, and following an unexpected victory in the 2018 local elections, replaced the SLFP as a main party, before becoming the ruling party following its victories in the 2019 presidential election and 2020 parliamentary election.

Meanwhile, the UNP suffered a split of its own in the lead-up to the 2020 parliamentary election, when deputy leader Sajith Premadasa split from the UNP and formed the Samagi Jana Balawegaya to contest in the election. The SJB-led coalition won the 2nd most seats in the election, thus making the SJB the main opposition party, while the UNP suffered an overwhelming defeat, only winning one national list seat.

Following widespread dissatisfaction with the traditional Sri Lankan political parties amidst the 2022 Sri Lankan protests, in 2024, the left-wing National People's Power, a political alliance led by the Janatha Vimukthi Peramuna, saw a surge in popular support. Formerly a third party, the NPP emerged as the main left-wing party of Sri Lanka, winning both the presidential and parliamentary elections that year.

Other notable parties include the Tamil nationalist Ilankai Tamil Arasu Kachchi and the Islamist Sri Lanka Muslim Congress.

== Alliances ==
=== Parliamentary alliances ===
| Alliance | Election symbol | Political position | Ideology | Est. | Leader | MPs | MLGs |
|---|---|---|---|---|---|---|---|
| National People's Power ජාතික ජන බලවේගය தேசிய மக்கள் சக்தி | | Left-wing | Socialism; Left-wing populism | 2019 | Anura Kumara Dissanayake | 159 / 225 | 3,942 / 8,741 |
| Samagi Jana Balawegaya සමගි ජන බලවේගය ஐக்கிய மக்கள் சக்தி | | Centre | Progressivism; Third Way; Social democracy | 2020 | Sajith Premadasa | 40 / 225 | 1,773 / 8,741 |
| New Democratic Front නව ප්‍රජාතන්ත්‍රවාදී පෙරමුණ புதிய சனநாயக முன்னணி | | Centre-right | Neoliberalism; Economic liberalism | 1995 | Ranil Wickremesinghe | 5 / 225 | 0 / 8,741 |
| Sarvajana Balaya සර්වජන බලය சர்வஜன அதிகாரம் | | Centre-left to far-left | Big tent; Sinhalese nationalism | 2024 | Dilith Jayaweera | 1 / 225 | 226 / 8,741 |
| Democratic Tamil National Alliance ප්‍රජාතන්ත්‍රවාදී දෙමළ ජාතික සන්ධානය சனநாயக தமிழ் தேசிய கூட்டணி | | Centre-left | Tamil nationalism | 2023 | Selvam Adaikalanathan | 1 / 225 | 106 / 8,741 |
| Tamil National People's Front ද්‍රවිඩ ජාතික ජනතා පෙරමුණ தமிழ் தேசிய மக்கள் முன்னணி | | Centre-left | Tamil nationalism | 2010 | Gajendrakumar Ponnambalam | 1 / 225 | 101 / 8,741 |

=== Other alliances ===
| Alliance | Election symbol | Political position | Ideology | Est. | Leader | MPs | MLGs | Notes |
|---|---|---|---|---|---|---|---|---|
| Tamil Progressive Alliance දෙමළ ප්‍රගතිශීලී සන්ධානය தமிழ் முற்போக்கு கூட்டணி | | Centre-left | Tamil nationalism; Indian Tamil interests | 2015 | Mano Ganesan | 3 / 225 | 14 / 8,741 | Allied with the SJB |

== Parties ==
=== Parliamentary registered parties ===
| Party | Election symbol | Political position | Ideology | Est. | Leader | MPs | MLGs |
|---|---|---|---|---|---|---|---|
National People's Power (NPP)
| Janatha Vimukthi Peramuna ජනතා විමුක්ති පෙරමුණ மக்கள் விடுதலை முன்னணி | | Left-wing to far-left | Communism; Progressivism; Anti-imperialism | 1965 | Anura Kumara Dissanayake | 159 / 225 | 3,942 / 8,741 |
Samagi Jana Balawegaya (SJB)
| Samagi Jana Balawegaya සමගි ජනබලවේගය ஐக்கிய மக்கள் சக்தி | | Centre | Progressivism; Third Way; Social democracy | 2020 | Sajith Premadasa | 32 / 225 | 1,773 / 8,741 |
| Sri Lanka Muslim Congress ශ්‍රී ලංකා මුස්ලිම් කොංග්‍රසය சிறீலங்கா முஸ்லிம் காங்கிரசு | | Centre | Muslim minority politics | 1981 | Rauff Hakeem | 5 / 225 | 43 / 8,741 |
| All Ceylon Makkal Congress සමස්ත ලංකා මහජන කොංග්‍රසය அகில இலங்கை மக்கள் காங்கிரஸ் | | Centre | Muslim minority politics | 2005 | Rishad Bathiudeen | 3 / 225 | 60 / 8,741 |
| Sri Lanka Freedom Party (Dayasiri wing) ශ්‍රී ලංකා නිදහස් පක්ෂය இலங்கை சுதந்திரக் கட்சி | | Centre-left | Social democracy; Sinhalese nationalism; Left-wing nationalism | 1951 | Dayasiri Jayasekara (Note: Disputed since 2024.) | 1 / 225 | 0 / 8,741 |
| Democratic People's Front ප්‍රජාතන්ත්‍රවාදී ජනතා පෙරමුණ மக்களாட்சி மக்கள் முன்னணி | | Centre | Indian Tamil interests | 2000 | Mano Ganesan | 1 / 225 | 9 / 8,741 |
| National Union of Workers ජාතික කම්කරු සංගමය தொழிலாளர் தேசிய சங்கம் | | Centre | Indian Tamil interests | 1965 | Palani Thigambaram | 1 / 225 | 1 / 8,741 |
| Up-Country People's Front කඳුරට ජනතා පෙරමුණ மலையக மக்கள் முன்னணி | | Centre | Indian Tamil interests | 1989 | V. Radhakrishnan | 1 / 225 | 4 / 8,741 |
New Democratic Front (NDF)
| People's United Freedom Alliance පොදු ජන එක්සත් නිදහස් සන්ධානය மக்கள் ஐக்கிய சுதந்திரக் கூட்டணி | | Syncretic | Big tent | 2024 | Dinesh Gunawardena | 2 / 225 | 1 / 8,741 |
| Sri Lanka Freedom Party (Nimal wing) ශ්‍රී ලංකා නිදහස් පක්ෂය இலங்கை சுதந்திரக் கட்சி | | Centre-left | Social democracy; Sinhalese nationalism; Left-wing nationalism | 1951 | Nimal Siripala de Silva | 2 / 225 | 302 / 8,741 |
| United National Party එක්සත් ජාතික පක්ෂය ஐக்கிய தேசியக் கட்சி | | Centre-right | Liberal conservatism; Economic liberalism | 1946 | Ranil Wickremesinghe | 1 / 225 | 381 / 8,741 |
| Ceylon Workers' Congress ලංකා කම්කරු කොංග්‍රසය இலங்கை தொழிலாளர் காங்கிரஸ் | | Centre | Agrarian socialism; Indian Tamil interests | 1939 | Jeevan Thondaman | 1 / 225 | 54 / 8,741 |
Sarvajana Balaya (SB)
| Mawbima Janatha Pakshaya මව්බිම ජනතා පක්ෂය தாய்நாடு ஜனதா கட்சி | | Centre-left | Big tent; Sinhalese nationalism | 2023 | Dilith Jayaweera | 1 / 225 | 0 / 8,741 |
Democratic Tamil National Alliance (DTNA)
| Tamil Eelam Liberation Organization ද්‍රවිඩ ඊලම් විමුක්ති සංවිධානය தமிழீழ விடுதலை இயக்கம் | | Syncretic | Tamil nationalism | 1979 | Selvam Adaikalanathan | 1 / 225 | 0 / 8,741 |
Tamil National People's Front (TNPF)
| All Ceylon Tamil Congress අකිල ඉලංකෙයි තමිල් කොංග්‍රස් அகில இலங்கைத் தமிழ்க் காங்கிரஸ் | | Centre-left | Tamil nationalism | 1944 | Gajendrakumar Ponnambalam | 1 / 225 | 101 / 8,741 |
Other parties
| Ilankai Tamil Arasu Kachchi ශ්‍රී ලංකා දෙමළ රාජ්‍ය පක්ෂය இலங்கைத் தமிழரசுக் கட்சி | | Centre-left | Tamil nationalism | 1949 | S. Shritharan | 8 / 225 | 377 / 8,741 |
| Sri Lanka Podujana Peramuna ශ්‍රී ලංකා පොදුජන පෙරමුණ இலங்கை பொதுஜன முன்னணி | | Right-wing | Neoconservatism; Sinhalese nationalism; Right-wing populism | 2016 | Mahinda Rajapaksa | 3 / 225 | 745 / 8,741 |
| Sri Lanka Labour Party ශ්‍රී ලංකා කම්කරු පක්ෂය ஸ்ரீலங்கா தொழிலாளர் கட்சி | | Left-wing | | 1998 | A. S. P. Liyanage | 1 / 225 | 26 / 8,741 |
| Independent groups ස්වාධීන කණ්ඩායම් சுயாதீன குழுக்கள் | | —N/a | | | | 1 / 225 | 322 / 8,741 |

=== Other registered parties ===
| Party | Election symbol | Est. | Leader | MPCs | MLGs |
|---|---|---|---|---|---|
| All Ceylon Tamil Mahasabha (Note: Formerly All Lanka Tamil United Front.) සමස්ත ලංකා දෙමළ මහාසභා அகில இலங்கை தமிழர் மகாசபை | | 2005 | K. Vigneswaran | | |
| Our Power of People's Party අපේ ජන බල පක්ෂය நமது மக்கள் சக்தி கட்சி | | | Galagoda Aththe Gnanasara | | |
| New Independent Front (Note: Formerly Okkoma Wesiyo Okkoma Rajawaru Sanvidhanaya.) අභිනව නිවහල් පෙරමුණ புதிய சுதந்திர முன்னணி | | | M. B. Thaminimulla | | |
| Arunalu People's Front අරුණළු ජනතා පෙරමුණ அருணலு மக்கள் முன்னணி | | | | | |
| Eros Democratic Front ඊරෝස් ප්‍රජාතන්ත්‍රවාදී පෙරමුණ ஈரோஸ் ஜனநாயக முன்னணி | | | | | |
| Eelam People's Democratic Party ඊලාම් ජනතා ප්‍රජාතන්ත්‍රවාදී පක්ෂය ஈழ மக்களாட்சி கட்சி | | 1987 | Douglas Devananda | | 35 / 8,741 |
| Eelam People's Revolutionary Liberation Front ඊලාම් ජනතා විප්ලවවාදී විමුක්ති පෙරමුණ ஈழமக்கள் புரட்சிகர விடுதலை முன்னணி | | 1980 | K. Pathmanabha; Annamalai Varadaraja Perumal | | |
| United Republican Front එක්සත් ජනරජ පෙරමුණ ஐக்கிய குடியரசு முன்னணி | | 2023 | Champika Ranawaka | | 7 / 8,741 |
| United National Freedom Front එක්සත් ජාතික නිදහස් පෙරමුණ ஐக்கிய தேசிய சுதந்திர முன்னணி | | | | | |
| United National Alliance (Note: Formerly Muslim National Alliance.) එක්සත් ජාතික සන්ධානය ஐக்கிய தேசிய கூட்டமைப்பு | | | | | |
| Democratic Unity Alliance එක්සත් ප්‍රජාතන්ත්‍රවාදී සන්ධානය ஜனநாயக ஐக்கிய முன்னணி | | 2004 | Z. A. Naseer Ahamed | | |
| United Democratic Voice එක්සත් ප්‍රජාතන්ත්‍රවාදී හඬ ஐக்கிய ஜனநாயகக் குரல் | | 2024 | Ranjan Ramanayake | | |
| United People's Party එක්සත් මහජන පක්‍ෂය ஐக்கிய மக்கள் கட்சி | | | | | |
| United Left Front එක්සත් වාමාංශික පෙරමුණ ஐக்கிய இடது முன்னணி | | | Jayampathy Wickramaratne | | |
| United Socialist Party එක්සත් සමාජවාදි පක්ෂය ஐக்கிய சோசலிச கட்சி | | | Siritunga Jayasuriya | | |
| United Peace Alliance (Note: Formerly Muslim Liberation Front.) එක්සත් සාම සන්ධානය ஐக்கிய சமாதான முன்னணி | | | | | |
| People's Struggle Alliance ජන අරගල සන්ධානය மக்கள் போராட்டக் கூட்டணி | | 2024 | | | 16 / 8,741 |
| People's Servants Party ජනතා සේවක පක්ෂය மக்கள் சேவகர்கள் கட்சி | | 2015 | | | |
| People's Welfare Front ජන සෙත පෙරමුණ ஜனசெத பெரமுண | | | | | |
| National Congress ජාතික කොංග්‍රසය தேசிய காங்கிரஸ் | | | A. L. M. Athaullah | | 22 / 8,741 |
| National People's Party ජාතික ජනතා පක්ෂය தேசிய மக்கள் கட்சி | | | | | 6 / 8,741 |
| Jathika Nidahas Peramuna ජාතික නිදහස් පෙරමුණ தேசிய சுதந்திர முன்னணி | | 2008 | Wimal Weerawansa | | 26 / 8,741 |
| National Democratic Front ජාතික ප්‍රජාතන්ත්‍රවාදී පෙරමුණ தேசிய ஜனநாயக முன்னணி | | | Aruna de Zoysa | | |
| National Development Front ජාතික සංවර්ධන පෙරමුණ தேசிய அபிவிருத்தி முன்னணி | | 2000 | Dr. Sarath Bandaranayake | | |
| National Peace Front ජාතික සමගි පෙරමුණ தேசிய ஒற்றுமை முன்னணி | | | | | |
| Tamil People's Alliance දෙමළ ජනතා සන්ධානය தமிழ் மக்கள் கூட்டணி | | | C. V. Vigneswaran | | |
| Tamil Makkal Viduthalai Pulikal තමිළ් මක්කල් විඩුදලෛප් පුළිකල් தமிழ் மக்கள் விடுதலைப் புலிகள் | | 2004 | S. Chandrakanthan | | 37 / 8,741 |
| Tamil Social Democratic Party දෙමළ සමාජ ප්‍රජාතන්ත්‍ර පක්‍ෂය தமிழ் சமூக ஜனநாயக கட்சி | | | | | |
| Devana Parapura දෙවන පරපුර இரண்டாம் தலைமுறை | | 2022 | Uvindu Wijeweera | | |
| Patriotic People's Power දේශප්‍රේමී ජනතා බලවේගය தேசபக்தி மக்கள் சக்தி | | | | | |
| Desha Vimukthi Janatha Pakshaya දේශ විමුක්ති ජනතා පක්ෂය தேச விமுக்தி ஜனதா பக்ஷய | | 1988 | D. Kalansooriya | | |
| Tamil United Liberation Front (Note: Formerly Tamil United Front.) ද්‍රවිඩ එක්සත් විමුක්ති පෙරමුණ தமிழர் விடுதலைக் கூட்டணி | | 1972 | V. Anandasangaree | | |
| New Democratic Marxist–Leninist Party නව ප්‍රජාතන්ත්‍රවාදී මාක්ස්වාදී ලෙනින්වාදී පක්ෂය புதிய ஜனநாயக மார்க்சிஸ்ட் லெனினிஸ்ட் கட்சி | | 1978 | S. K. Senthivel | | |
| New Lanka Freedom Party නව ලංකා නිදහස් පක්ෂය புதிய இலங்கை சுதந்திரக் கட்சி | | 2020 | | | |
| Nava Sama Samaja Party නව සමසමාජ පක්ෂය நவ சம சமாஜக் கட்சி | | 1977 | Vikramabahu Karunaratne | | |
| New Sinhala Heritage නව සිහළ උරුමය நவ சிஹல உறுமய | | 2006 | Sarath Manamendra | | |
| Freedom People's Front නිදහස් ජනතා පෙරමුණ சுதந்திர மக்கள் முன்னணி | | 2022 | Nalaka Godahewa | | |
| Pivithuru Hela Urumaya පිවිතුරු හෙළ උරුමය பிவிதுரு ஹெல உருமய | | | Udaya Gammanpila | | |
| Frontline Socialist Party පෙරටුගාමී සමාජවාදී පක්ෂය முன்னிலை சோசலிசக் கட்சி | | 2012 | Premakumar Gunaratnam | | |
| People's Alliance පොදු ජන එක්සත් පෙරමුණ பொது ஜன முன்னணி | | 1994 | Anura Priyadharshana Yapa | | 302 / 8,741 |
| Democratic United National Front ප්‍රජාතන්ත්‍රවාදී එක්සත් ජාතික පෙරමුණ ஜனநாயக ஐக்கிய தேசிய முன்னணி | | 1990 | Ariyawansa Dissanayake | | |
| Democratic People's Liberation Front ප්‍රජාතන්ත්‍රවාදී ජනතා විමුක්ති පෙරමුණ மக்கட்தலை மக்கள் விடுதலை முன்னணி | | 1988 | D. Siddarthan | | |
| Democratic National Alliance ප්‍රජාතන්ත්‍රවාදී ජාතික සන්ධානය மக்களாட்சி தேசியக் கூட்டணி | | 2009 | | | |
| Democratic Party ප්‍රජාතන්ත්‍රවාදී පක්ෂය சனநாயகக் கட்சி | | 2013 | Sarath Fonseka | | |
| Democratic Left Front ප්‍රජාතන්ත්‍රවාදී වාමාංශික පෙරමුණ மக்களாட்சி இடதுசாரி முன்னணி | | 1999 | Vasudeva Nanayakkara | | |
| Mahajana Eksath Peramuna මහජන එක්සත් පෙරමුණ‍ மகாஜன எக்சத் பெரமுன | | 1959 | Dinesh Gunawardena | | |
| United National Front for Good Governance යහපාලනය සඳහා වූ ජාතික පෙරමුණ நல்லாட்சிக்கான ஐக்கிய தேசிய முன்னணி | | | Abdul Rahman | | |
| Lanka Sama Samaja Party ලංකා සම සමාජ පක්ෂය இலங்கை சமசமாஜக் கட்சி | | 1935 | Tissa Vitharana | | |
| Liberal Democratic Party ලිබරල් ප්‍රජාතන්ත්‍රවාදී පක්ෂය லிபரல் சனநாயகக் கட்சி | | 1987 | Kamal Nissanka | | |
| Sri Lanka Mahajana Pakshaya ශ්‍රී ලංකා මහජන පක්ෂය ஶ்ரீ லங்கா மக்கள் கட்சி | | 1984 | Asanka Nawaratne | | |
| Communist Party of Sri Lanka ශ්‍රී ලංකාවේ කොමියුනිස්ට් පක්ෂය இலங்கை இனவாத கட்சி | | 1943 | D. E. W. Gunasekera | | 13 / 8,741 |
| Social Democratic Party of Sri Lanka ශ්‍රී ලංකා සමාජ ප්‍රජාතන්ත්‍රවාදී පක්ෂය இலங்கை சமூக ஜனநாயகக் கட்சி | | 2017 | Rohan Pallewatta | | |
| Socialist Party of Sri Lanka ශ්‍රී ලංකා සමාජවාදී පක්ෂය இலங்கை சோசலிஸ்ட் கட்சி | | 2006 | | | |
| Samabima Party සමබිම පක්ෂය சமபிம கட்சி | | | | | |
| Socialist Equality Party (Note: Formerly Revolutionary Communist League.) සමාජවාදී සමානතා පක්ෂය சோசலிச சமத்துவக் கட்சி | | 1968 | | | |
| Sinhaladeepa Jathika Peramuna සිංහලදීප ජාතික පෙරමුණ சிங்களதீப தேசிய முன்னணி | | | | | |
| Eelavar Democratic Front (Note: Political wing of Eelam Revolutionary Organisation of Students.) ඊලවර් ප්‍රජාතන්ත්‍රවාදී පෙරමුණ ஈழவர் ஜனநாயக முன்னணி | | 1975 | Eliyathamby Ratnasabapathy; V. Balakumaran; Shankar Rajee | | |
| United People's Freedom Alliance එක්සත් ජනතා නිදහස් සන්ධානය ஐக்கிய மக்கள் சுதந்திரக் கூட்டணி | | 2004 | | | |
| United Lanka People's Party එක්සත් ලංකා පොදුජන පක්ෂය எக்சத் லங்கா பொதுஜன பக்ஷய | | | | | |
| United Lanka Mahasabha එක්සත් ලංකා මහා සභාව ஐக்கிய இலங்கை மகா சபை | | | Nath Amarakone | | |
| Lanka People's Party (Note: Formerly Sinhala Ravaya.) ලංකා ජනතා පක්ෂය இலங்கை மக்கள் கட்சி | | | | | |
| Sri Lanka Progressive Front ශ්‍රී ලංකා ප්‍රගතිශීලී පෙරමුණ ஸ்ரீலங்கா முற்போக்கு முன்னணி | | 1996 | J. A. Peter Nelson Perera | | |
| Motherland People's Party (Note: Formerly Sinhalaye Mahasammatha Bhoomiputra Pakshaya.) මව්බිම ජනතා පක්‍ෂය மௌவ்பிம ஜனதா பக்ஷய | | 2009 | Harischandra Wijayatunga | | |

=== Unregistered parties ===
| Party | Election symbol | Est. | Leader | Alliance |
|---|---|---|---|---|
| Freedom People's Congress නිදහස ජනතා සභාව சுதந்திர மக்கள் காங்கிரஸ் | | 2022 | Dullas Alahapperuma | SJB |
| Democratic National Front ප්‍රජාතන්ත්‍රවාදී ජාතික පෙරමුණ ஜனநாயக தேசிய முன்னணி | | | Praba Ganesan | DNA |
| Jathika Hela Urumaya ජාතික හෙළ උරුමය ஜாதிக எல உறுமய | | February 2004 | Ven.Omalpe Sobhitha Thero | SJB |
| Our National Front අපේ ජාතික පෙරමුණ எமது தேசிய முன்னணி | | 2009 | Upulangani Malagamuwa | |
| United Lanka National Front එක්සත් ලංකා ජාතික පෙරමුණ ஐக்கிய இலங்கை தேசிய முன்னணி | | | | |
| Buddhist People's Front බොදු ජන පෙරමුණ பௌத்த மக்கள் முன்னணி | | | | |
| Ceylon Communist Party (Maoist) ලංකා කොමියුනිස්ට් පක්ෂය (මාඕවාදී) இலங்கை கம்யூனிஸ்ட் கட்சி (மாவோயிஸ்ட்) | | 1964 | | |
| Ceylon Democratic Unity Alliance ලංකා ප්‍රජාතන්ත්‍රවාදී එක්සත් සන්ධානය இலங்கை ஜனநாயக ஐக்கிய கூட்டணி | | 2002 | T. V. Chennan | |
| Democratic People's Congress ප්‍රජාතන්ත්‍රවාදී මහජන කොංග්‍රසය ஜனநாயக மக்கள் காங்கிரஸ் | | | Praba Ganesan | DTNF |
| Eelam National Democratic Liberation Front ඊළාම් ජාතික ප්‍රජාතන්ත්‍රවාදී විමුක්ති පෙරමුණ ஈழ தேசிய ஜனநாய விடுதலை முன்னணி | | 1987 | | |
| Muslim Tamil National Alliance මුස්ලිම් දෙමළ ජාතික සන්ධානය முஸ்லிம் தமிழ் தேசிய கூட்டமைப்பு | | | Azath Salley | |
| Bahujana Nidahas Peramuna ජනතා නිදහස් පෙරමුණ மக்கள் சுதந்திர முன்னணி | | 1991 | | |
| People's Liberation Solidarity Front මහජන විමුක්ති සහයෝගිතා පෙරමුණ மக்கள் விடுதலை ஒற்றுமை முன்னணி | | 1997 | Kamal Karunadasa | |
| People's Tamil Congress මහජන දෙමළ කොංග්‍රසය மக்கள் தமிழ் காங்கிரஸ் | | | L. P. Shanmuganathan | |
| Revolutionary Workers Party (Note: Formerly Revolutionary Samasamaja Party.) විප්ලවවාදී කම්කරු පක්ෂය புரட்சிகர தொழிலாளர் கட்சி | | 1968 | | |
| United Citizens’ Front එක්සත් පුරවැසි පෙරමුණ ஐக்கிய குடிமக்கள் முன்னணி | | | Tissa Attanayake | |
| United National Alternative Front එක්සත් ජාතික විකල්ප පෙරමුණ ஐக்கிய தேசிய மாற்று முன்னணி | | 2000 | | |
| Upcountry National Front කඳුරට ජාතික පෙරමුණ மலையக தேசிய முன்னணி | | 2000 | Rishi Senthil Raj | |
| Green Party of Sri Lanka ශ්‍රී ලංකා හරිත පක්ෂය இலங்கை பசுமைக் கட்சி | | | | |
| Sri Lanka National Force (Note: Formerly Patriotic National Front.) ශ්‍රී ලංකා ජාතික බලය ஸ்ரீ லங்கா தேசிய சக்தி | | | | |
| Sri Lanka Vanguard Party ශ්‍රී ලංකා පෙරටුගාමී පක්ෂය இலங்கை முன்னிலை கட்சி | | | | |
| Progressive Tamil Party ප්‍රගතිශීලී දෙමළ පක්ෂය முற்போக்குத்த தமிழர் கச்சி | | | | |
| Vijaya Dharani National Council විජය ධරණි ජාතික සභාව விஜய தரணி தேசிய கவுன்சில் | | | | |
| Eelam People's Revolutionary Liberation Front (Suresh Wing) ඊලාම් ජනතා විප්ලවවාදී විමුක්ති පෙරමුණ ஈழ மக்கள் புரட்சிகர விடுதலை முன்னணி | | 2000 | Suresh Premachandran | |
| Ealam Tamil Self Rule Party ඊලාම් තමිලර් සුයාට්ච්චි කච්චි ஈழத் தமிழர் சுயாட்சிக் கட்சி | | | Ananthi Sasitharan | |
| Tamil National Party දෙමළ ජාතික පක්ෂය தமிழரசுக் கட்சி | | | M. K. Shivajilingam; N. Srikantha | |
| Democratic Tamil National Front ප්‍රජාතන්ත්‍රවාදී දෙමළ ජාතික පෙරමුණ மக்களாட்சி தமிழ்த் தேசிய முன்னணி | | 4 May 2016 | V. Anandasangaree | |
| Muslim National Alliance මුස්ලිම් ජාතික සන්ධානය முஸ்லிம் தேசிய கூட்டமைப்பு | | | | |

== Defunct/dormant ==
=== Alliances ===
| Alliance | Political position | Ideology | Founded | Dissolved | Notes |
|---|---|---|---|---|---|
| Left Liberation Front (Note: Formerly New Left Front, Left Front.) වාමාංශික විමුක්ති පෙරමුණ இடது விடுதலை முன்னணி | Far-left | Communism; Trotskyism | 1998 | | |
| United Front සමගි පෙරමුණ ஐக்கிய முன்னணி | Left-wing | Big tent | 1968 | 1977 | |
| People's Alliance පොදු ජන එක්සත් පෙරමුණ மக்கள் கூட்டணி | Big tent | | 1994 | 2004 | Most members joined the UPFA |
| National Unity Alliance ජාතික සමගි සන්ධානය தேசிய ஐக்கியக் கூட்டமைப்பு | Centre | Muslim minority politics | 1999 | 2010 | Most members joined the SLFP |
| Tamil National Liberation Alliance දෙමළ ජාතික විමුක්ති සන්ධානය தமிழ் தனிநாடு விடுதலை கூட்டணி | | Tamil nationalism | 22 February 2010 | 25 June 2011 | Members joined the TNA |
| Democratic National Alliance ප්‍රජාතන්ත්‍රවාදී ජාතික සන්ධානය ஜனநாயகக் கட்சி | Big tent | | 22 November 2009 | | |
| United National Front එක්සත් ජාතික පෙරමුණ ஐக்கிய தேசிய முன்னணி | Centre-right | Conservatism | 21 October 2001 | 2020 | Most members joined the SJB |
| United People's Freedom Alliance එක්සත් ජනතා නිදහස් සන්ධානය ஐக்கிய மக்கள் சுதந்திரக் கூட்டணி | Centre-left | Social democracy Sinhalese nationalism | 20 January 2004 | 9 December 2019 | Most members joined the SLPFA |
| Joint Opposition ඒකාබද්ධ විපක්ෂය கூட்டு எதிர்ப்பு | Right-wing | Right-wing populism Social democracy Sinhalese nationalism Anti-federalism; Anti-imperialism; Pro-Rajapaksa politics | 2015 | 2018 | Most members joined the SLPFA |
| Socialist Alliance සමාජවාදී සන්ධානය சோசலிஸ்ட் கூட்டணி | Left-wing to far-left | Socialism; Communism | 2006 | 2021 | |
| Sri Lanka People's Freedom Alliance ශ්‍රී ලංකා නිදහස් පොදුජන සන්ධානය ஶ்ரீ லங்கா பொதுஜன சுதந்திர கூட்டமைப்பு | Big tent | Social democracy Sinhalese nationalism Anti-federalism; Anti-imperialism; Pro-Rajapaksa politics | 31 October 2019 | 5 April 2022 | Many members joined the opposition |
| Freedom People's Alliance නිදහස් ජනතා සන්ධානය சுதந்திர மக்கள் கூட்டணி | Centre-left to far-left | Social democracy Sinhalese nationalism Anti-Rajapaksa politics | 11 January 2023 | 2024 | |
| Supreme Lanka Coalition උත්‍ත‍ර ලංකා සභාගය உத்தர லங்கா சபாகய | Left-wing to far-left | Left-wing nationalism Sinhalese nationalism Anti-Rajapaksa politics | 4 September 2022 | 2024 | Most members joined the SB |
| Tamil People's National Alliance දෙමළ ජනතා ජාතික සන්ධානය தமிழ் மக்கள் தேசிய கூட்டணி | Centre-left | Tamil nationalism | 9 February 2020 | 2024 | |
| Tamil National Alliance දෙමළ ජාතික සන්ධානය தமிழ்த் தேசியக் கூட்டமைப்பு | Centre-left | Tamil nationalism Federalism | 20 October 2001 | 2024 | Most members joined the DTNA |

=== Parties ===
| Party | Election symbol | Founded | Dissolved | Leader | Notes |
|---|---|---|---|---|---|
| All Ceylon Islamic United Front සමස්ත ලංකා ඉස්ලාමීය එක්සත් පෙරමුණ அகில இலங்கை இஸ்லாமிய ஐக்கிய முன்னணி | | 1960 | | M. S. Kariapper | |
| All Ceylon Malay Political Union සමස්ත ලංකා මැලේ දේශපාලන සංගමය அகில இலங்கை மலாய் அரசியல் ஒன்றியம் | | 1944 | | M. P. Drahaman | |
| Aziz Democratic Workers Congress අසීස් ප්‍රජාතන්ත්‍රවාදී කම්කරු කොංග්‍රසය அஜீஸ் ஜனநாயக தொழிலாளர் காங்கிரஸ் | | 1990 | | Ashraf Aziz | |
| Bolshevik Samasamaja Party (Note: Formerly Bolshevik–Leninist Party of India, Ceylon and Burma.) බොල්ෂෙවික් සමසමාජ පක්ෂය போல்ஷிவிக் சமசமாஜ கட்சி | | 1948 | 1950 | | Absorbed into the Lanka Sama Samaja Party |
| Buddhist Republican Party බෞද්ධ ජනරජ පක්ෂය புத்த குடியரசு கட்சி | | 1952 | | A. P. de Zoysa | |
| Ceylon Labour Party ලංකා කම්කරු පක්ෂය இலங்கை தொழிலாளர் கட்சி | | 1928 | | A. Ekanayake Gunasinha | |
| Ceylon National Congress ලංකා ජාතික කොංග්‍රසය இலங்கை தேசிய காங்கிரஸ் | | 11 December 1919 | | Ponnambalam Arunachalam | Absorbed into the United National Party |
| Lanka Democratic Party ලංකා ප්‍රජාතන්ත්‍රවාදී පක්ෂය இலங்கை சனநாயகக் கட்சி | | | | Wijeyananda Dahanayake | Absorbed into the Sri Lanka Freedom Socialist Party |
| Lanka Mahajana Sabha ලංකා මහජන සභාව லங்கா மகாஜன சபை | | 1919 | | Fredrick Richard Senanayake | Absorbed into the United National Party |
| Lanka Sama Samaja Party (Alternative Group) ලංකා සමසමාජ පක්ෂය (විකල්ප කණ්ඩායම) லங்கா சமசமாஜ கட்சி (மாற்றுக் குழு) | | | | Chandra Kumarage | |
| Lanka Sama Samaja Party (Revolutionary) ලංකා සමසමාජ පක්ෂය (විප්ලවවාදී) லங்கா சமசமாஜ கட்சி (புரட்சிகர) | | 1964 | | | |
| Muslim United Liberation Front මුස්ලිම් එක්සත් විමුක්ති පෙරමුණ முஸ்லிம் ஐக்கிய விடுதலை முன்னணி | | | | | |
| National Alliance ජාතික සන්ධානය தேசியக் கூட்டணி | | | | | |
| National Democratic Movement ජාතික ප්‍රජාතන්ත්‍රවාදී ව්‍යාපාරය தேசிய ஜனநாயக இயக்கம் | | | | | |
| National Democratic Party ජාතික ප්‍රජාතන්ත්‍රවාදී පක්ෂය தேசிய ஜனநாயக கட்சி | | | | | |
| National Democratic People's Alliance ජාතික ප්‍රජාතන්ත්‍රවාදී ජනතා සන්ධානය தேசிய ஜனநாயக மக்கள் கூட்டமைப்பு | | 4 February 2008 | | | |
| National Liberation Front ජාතික විමුක්ති පෙරමුණ தேசிய விடுதலை முன்னணி | | 1957 | 1965 | K. M. P. Rajaratne | Absorbed into the United National Party |
| New Democratic Party නව ප්‍රජාතන්ත්‍රවාදී පක්ෂය புதிய ஜனநாயகக் கட்சி | | | | | |
| New National Front නව ජාතික පෙරමුණ புதிய தேசிய முன்னணி | | 2011 | | | |
| People's Front of Liberation Tigers විඩුතලෛප් පුලිකල් මක්කල් මුන්නනි விடுதலைப் புலிகள் மக்கள் முன்னணி | | 1989 | 2011 | Mahattaya | Political wing of the Liberation Tigers of Tamil Eelam |
| Sinhala Heritage සිංහල උරුමය சிங்கள உறுமய | | | | | Absorbed into the Jathika Hela Urumaya |
| Sinhala Maha Sabha සිංහල මහා සභාව சிங்கள மகா சபை | | 1936 | | S. W. R. D. Bandaranaike | Absorbed into the United National Party |
| Sri Lanka Freedom Socialist Party ශ්‍රී ලංකා නිදහස් සමාජවාදී පක්ෂය ஸ்ரீலங்கா சுதந்திர சோசலிச கட்சி | | 1964 | | C. P. de Silva | Absorbed into the United National Party |
| Sri Lanka National Congress ශ්‍රී ලංකා ජාතික කොංග්‍රසය இலங்கை தேசிய காங்கிரஸ் | | 2009 | 2011 | | Absorbed into the Sri Lanka Freedom Party |
| Sri Lanka Sama Samaja Party ශ්‍රී ලංකා සමසමාජ පක්ෂය இலங்கை சம சமாஜ கட்சி | | 1982 | 1983 | Anil Moonesinghe | Absorbed into the Sri Lanka Freedom Party |
| Swaraj Party ස්වරාජ් පක්ෂය ஸ்வராஜ் கட்சி | | | | | |
| United Lanka Congress එක්සත් ලංකා කොංග්‍රසය ஐக்கிய லங்கா காங்கிரஸ் | | | | | |
| United Muslim People's Alliance එක්සත් මුස්ලිම් ජනතා සන්ධානය ஐக்கிய முஸ்லிம் மக்கள் கூட்டமைப்பு | | | | | |
| United National Alliance එක්සත් ජාතික සන්ධානය ஐக்கிய தேசியக் கூட்டமைப்பு | | | | | |
| Viplavakari Lanka Sama Samaja Party විප්ලවකාරි ලංකා සමසමාජ පක්ෂය விப்லவகாரி லங்கா சம சமாஜ கட்சி | | 1950 | 1959 | Philip Gunawardena | Absorbed into the Mahajana Eksath Peramuna |
