= Results of the 1994 Sri Lankan general election by province =

Results of the 1994 Sri Lankan general election by province.

== Number of votes ==
Province	PA	UNP	SLMC	TULF	SLPF	MEP	EROS PLOTE TELO^{1}	Ind	UCPF^{2}	EPDP^{3}	EPRLF	NSSP	Others	Valid Votes	Rejected Votes	Total Polled	Registered Electors	Turnout %
Central	468,021	577,423			5,433	3,975		2,206	27,374					1,084,432	65,257	1,149,689	1,372,131	83.79%
North Central	262,892	218,790			5,011	1,369		0						488,062	21,054	509,116	607,118	83.86%
North Eastern	102,897	144,847	143,307	132,461	1,262		36,915	8,658		10,744	9,411	44		590,546	38,310	628,856	1,533,057	41.02%
North Western	517,461	460,218			6,605	3,724		0						988,008	43,215	1,031,223	1,256,783	82.05%
Sabaragamuwa	424,376	424,688			5,713	1,634		1,884						858,295	40,654	898,949	1,055,554	85.16%
Southern	637,249	440,674			31,284	7,647		1,465					741	1,119,060	51,469	1,170,529	1,462,805	80.02%
Uva	224,501	249,884			5,451	1,541		10,345						491,722	44,845	536,567	634,651	84.55%
Western	1,250,426	981,846			29,319	48,648	1,113	9,251				2,050	928	2,323,581	95,585	2,419,166	3,022,966	80.03%
Total	3,887,823	3,498,370	143,307	132,461	90,078	68,538	38,028	33,809	27,374	10,744	9,411	2,094	1,669	7,943,706	400,389	8,344,095	10,945,065	76.24%

1. The EROS/PLOTE/TELO alliance contested as TELO in Ampara District, Batticaloa District, Colombo District and Trincomalee District; as DPLF in Vanni District; and as in an independent group in Jaffna District. 2. UCPF contested as an independent group in Nuwara Eliya District. 3. EPDP contested as an independent group in Jaffna District.

== Percentage of votes ==
Province	PA	UNP	SLMC	TULF	SLPF	MEP	EROS PLOTE TELO^{1}	Ind	UCPF^{2}	EPDP^{3}	EPRLF	NSSP	Others	Total
Central	43.16%	53.25%			0.50%	0.37%		0.20%	2.52%					100.00%
North Central	53.86%	44.83%			1.03%	0.28%								100.00%
North Eastern	17.42%	24.53%	24.27%	22.43%	0.21%		6.25%	1.47%		1.82%	1.59%	0.01%		100.00%
North Western	52.37%	46.58%			0.67%	0.38%								100.00%
Sabaragamuwa	49.44%	49.48%			0.67%	0.19%		0.22%						100.00%
Southern	56.95%	39.38%			2.80%	0.68%		0.13%					0.07%	100.00%
Uva	45.66%	50.82%			1.11%	0.31%		2.10%						100.00%
Western	53.81%	42.26%			1.26%	2.09%	0.05%	0.40%				0.09%	0.04%	100.00%
Total	48.94%	44.04%	1.80%	1.67%	1.13%	0.86%	0.48%	0.43%	0.34%	0.14%	0.12%	0.03%	0.02%	100.00%

1. The EROS/PLOTE/TELO alliance contested as TELO in Ampara District, Batticaloa District, Colombo District and Trincomalee District; as DPLF in Vanni District; and as in an independent group in Jaffna District. 2. UCPF contested as an independent group in Nuwara Eliya District. 3. EPDP contested as an independent group in Jaffna District.

== Seats ==
Province	PA	UNP	SLMC	TULF	SLPF	MEP	EROS PLOTE TELO^{1}	Ind	UCPF^{2}	EPDP^{3}	EPRLF	NSSP	Others	Total
Central	10	14			0	0		0	1					25
North Central	8	5			0	0								13
North Eastern	2	7	6	4	0		3	0		9	0	0		31
North Western	12	10			0	0								22
Sabaragamuwa	10	9			0	0		0						19
Southern	15	9			1	0		0					0	25
Uva	6	7			0	0		0						13
Western	28	20			0	0	0	0				0	0	48
National List	14	13	1	1	0	0	0	0			0	0	0	29
Total	105	94	7	5	1	0	3	0	1	9	0	0	0	225

1. The EROS/PLOTE/TELO alliance contested as TELO in Ampara District, Batticaloa District, Colombo District and Trincomalee District; as DPLF in Vanni District; and as in an independent group in Jaffna District. 2. UCPF contested as an independent group in Nuwara Eliya District. 3. EPDP contested as an independent group in Jaffna District.

== See also ==
- Results of the 1994 Sri Lankan general election by electoral district
