= Results of the 1994 Sri Lankan general election by electoral district =

Results of the 1994 Sri Lankan general election by electoral district.

== Number of votes ==
| Electoral District | Province | PA | UNP | SLMC | TULF | SLPF | MEP | EROS PLOTE TELO^{1} | Ind | UCPF^{2} | EPDP^{3} | EPRLF | NSSP | Others | Valid Votes | Rejected Votes | Total Polled | Registered Electors | Turnout % |
|---|---|---|---|---|---|---|---|---|---|---|---|---|---|---|---|---|---|---|---|
| Ampara | NE | 54,150 | 78,767 | 75,092 | 24,526 | 673 | | 4,192 | 3,366 | | | | | | 240,766 | 12,736 | 253,502 | 312,006 | 81.25% |
| Anuradhapura | NC | 180,454 | 142,084 | | | 3,077 | 1,369 | | | | | | | | 326,984 | 14,620 | 341,604 | 406,926 | 83.95% |
| Badulla | UV | 146,546 | 182,131 | | | 3,555 | 1,541 | | 3,286 | | | | | | 337,059 | 28,540 | 365,599 | 435,260 | 84.00% |
| Batticaloa | NE | 19,278 | 23,244 | 31,072 | 76,516 | | | 17,073 | 2,103 | | | 4,802 | | | 174,088 | 15,531 | 189,619 | 261,898 | 72.40% |
| Colombo | WE | 469,642 | 385,100 | | | 11,454 | 42,734 | 1,113 | 9,251 | | | | 2,050 | 589 | 921,933 | 36,635 | 958,568 | 1,235,959 | 77.56% |
| Galle | SO | 277,956 | 203,268 | | | 7,239 | 4,145 | | | | | | | 306 | 492,914 | 20,763 | 513,677 | 632,422 | 81.22% |
| Gampaha | WE | 509,030 | 375,631 | | | 11,627 | | | | | | | | | 896,288 | 33,553 | 929,841 | 1,140,808 | 81.51% |
| Hambantota | SO | 132,008 | 95,382 | | | 15,309 | 2,080 | | 1,465 | | | | | 435 | 246,679 | 13,539 | 260,218 | 326,913 | 79.60% |
| Jaffna | NE | | | 2,098 | | | | 374 | | | 10,744 | 263 | | | 13,479 | 352 | 13,831 | 596,366 | 2.32% |
| Kalutara | WE | 271,754 | 221,115 | | | 6,238 | 5,914 | | | | | | | 339 | 505,360 | 25,397 | 530,757 | 646,199 | 82.14% |
| Kandy | CE | 267,683 | 301,824 | | | 3,072 | 3,495 | | 478 | | | | | | 576,552 | 31,019 | 607,571 | 726,192 | 83.67% |
| Kegalle | SA | 190,689 | 203,938 | | | 3,383 | | | | | | | | | 398,010 | 17,043 | 415,053 | 500,947 | 82.85% |
| Kurunegala | NW | 366,856 | 332,547 | | | 4,990 | 2,886 | | | | | | | | 707,279 | 30,071 | 737,350 | 876,591 | 84.12% |
| Matale | CE | 102,680 | 100,121 | | | 1,433 | | | 1,728 | | | | | | 205,962 | 12,646 | 218,608 | 259,271 | 84.32% |
| Matara | SO | 227,285 | 142,024 | | | 8,736 | 1,422 | | | | | | | | 379,467 | 17,167 | 396,634 | 503,470 | 78.78% |
| Monaragala | UV | 77,955 | 67,753 | | | 1,896 | | | 7,059 | | | | | | 154,663 | 16,305 | 170,968 | 199,391 | 85.75% |
| Nuwara Eliya | CE | 97,658 | 175,478 | | | 928 | 480 | | | 27,374 | | | | | 301,918 | 21,592 | 323,510 | 386,668 | 83.67% |
| Polonnaruwa | NC | 82,438 | 76,706 | | | 1,934 | | | | | | | | | 161,078 | 6,434 | 167,512 | 200,192 | 83.68% |
| Puttalam | NW | 150,605 | 127,671 | | | 1,615 | 838 | | | | | | | | 280,729 | 13,144 | 293,873 | 380,192 | 77.30% |
| Ratnapura | SA | 233,687 | 220,750 | | | 2,330 | 1,634 | | 1,884 | | | | | | 460,285 | 23,611 | 483,896 | 554,607 | 87.25% |
| Trincomalee | NE | 23,886 | 34,986 | 26,903 | 28,380 | 589 | | 3,709 | 608 | | | 881 | | | 119,942 | 6,682 | 126,624 | 184,090 | 68.78% |
| Vanni | NE | 5,583 | 7,850 | 8,142 | 3,039 | | | 11,567 | 2,581 | | | 3,465 | 44 | | 42,271 | 3,009 | 45,280 | 178,697 | 25.34% |
| Total | | 3,887,823 | 3,498,370 | 143,307 | 132,461 | 90,078 | 68,538 | 38,028 | 33,809 | 27,374 | 10,744 | 9,411 | 2,094 | 1,669 | 7,943,706 | 400,389 | 8,344,095 | 10,945,065 | 76.24% |

1. The EROS/PLOTE/TELO alliance contested as TELO in Ampara District, Batticaloa District, Colombo District and Trincomalee District; as DPLF in Vanni District; and as in an independent group in Jaffna District. 2. UCPF contested as an independent group in Nuwara Eliya District. 3. EPDP contested as an independent group in Jaffna District.

== Percentage of votes ==
| Electoral District | Province | PA | UNP | SLMC | TULF | SLPF | MEP | EROS PLOTE TELO^{1} | Ind | UCPF^{2} | EPDP^{3} | EPRLF | NSSP | Others | Total |
|---|---|---|---|---|---|---|---|---|---|---|---|---|---|---|---|
| Ampara | NE | 22.49% | 32.72% | 31.19% | 10.19% | 0.28% | | 1.74% | 1.40% | | | | | | 100.00% |
| Anuradhapura | NC | 55.19% | 43.45% | | | 0.94% | 0.42% | | | | | | | | 100.00% |
| Badulla | UV | 43.48% | 54.04% | | | 1.05% | 0.46% | | 0.97% | | | | | | 100.00% |
| Batticaloa | NE | 11.07% | 13.35% | 17.85% | 43.95% | | | 9.81% | 1.21% | | | 2.76% | | | 100.00% |
| Colombo | WE | 50.94% | 41.77% | | | 1.24% | 4.64% | 0.12% | 1.00% | | | | 0.22% | 0.06% | 100.00% |
| Galle | SO | 56.39% | 41.24% | | | 1.47% | 0.84% | | | | | | | 0.06% | 100.00% |
| Gampaha | WE | 56.79% | 41.91% | | | 1.30% | | | | | | | | | 100.00% |
| Hambantota | SO | 53.51% | 38.67% | | | 6.21% | 0.84% | | 0.59% | | | | | 0.18% | 100.00% |
| Jaffna | NE | | | 15.56% | | | | 2.77% | | | 79.71% | 1.95% | | | 100.00% |
| Kalutara | WE | 53.77% | 43.75% | | | 1.23% | 1.17% | | | | | | | 0.07% | 100.00% |
| Kandy | CE | 46.43% | 52.35% | | | 0.53% | 0.61% | | 0.08% | | | | | | 100.00% |
| Kegalle | SA | 47.91% | 51.24% | | | 0.85% | | | | | | | | | 100.00% |
| Kurunegala | NW | 51.87% | 47.02% | | | 0.71% | 0.41% | | | | | | | | 100.00% |
| Matale | CE | 49.85% | 48.61% | | | 0.70% | | | 0.84% | | | | | | 100.00% |
| Matara | SO | 59.90% | 37.43% | | | 2.30% | 0.37% | | | | | | | | 100.00% |
| Monaragala | UV | 50.40% | 43.81% | | | 1.23% | | | 4.56% | | | | | | 100.00% |
| Nuwara Eliya | CE | 32.35% | 58.12% | | | 0.31% | 0.16% | | | 9.07% | | | | | 100.00% |
| Polonnaruwa | NC | 51.18% | 47.62% | | | 1.20% | | | | | | | | | 100.00% |
| Puttalam | NW | 53.65% | 45.48% | | | 0.58% | 0.30% | | | | | | | | 100.00% |
| Ratnapura | SA | 50.77% | 47.96% | | | 0.51% | 0.35% | | 0.41% | | | | | | 100.00% |
| Trincomalee | NE | 19.91% | 29.17% | 22.43% | 23.66% | 0.49% | | 3.09% | 0.51% | | | 0.73% | | | 100.00% |
| Vanni | NE | 13.21% | 18.57% | 19.26% | 7.19% | | | 27.36% | 6.11% | | | 8.20% | 0.10% | | 100.00% |
| Total | | 48.94% | 44.04% | 1.80% | 1.67% | 1.13% | 0.86% | 0.48% | 0.43% | 0.34% | 0.14% | 0.12% | 0.03% | 0.02% | 100.00% |

1. EROS contested as an independent group in four districts (Batticaloa, Jaffna, Trincomalee and Vanni). 1. The EROS/PLOTE/TELO alliance contested as TELO in Ampara District, Batticaloa District, Colombo District and Trincomalee District; as DPLF in Vanni District; and as in an independent group in Jaffna District. 2. UCPF contested as an independent group in Nuwara Eliya District. 3. EPDP contested as an independent group in Jaffna District.

== Seats ==
| Electoral District | Province | PA | UNP | SLMC | TULF | SLPF | MEP | EROS PLOTE TELO^{1} | Ind | UCPF^{2} | EPDP^{3} | EPRLF | NSSP | Others | Total |
|---|---|---|---|---|---|---|---|---|---|---|---|---|---|---|---|
| Ampara | NE | 1 | 3 | 2 | 0 | 0 | | 0 | 0 | | | | | | 6 |
| Anuradhapura | NC | 5 | 3 | | | 0 | 0 | | | | | | | | 8 |
| Badulla | UV | 3 | 5 | | | 0 | 0 | | 0 | | | | | | 8 |
| Batticaloa | NE | 0 | 1 | 1 | 3 | | | 0 | 0 | | | 0 | | | 5 |
| Colombo | WE | 11 | 9 | | | 0 | 0 | 0 | 0 | | | | 0 | 0 | 20 |
| Galle | SO | 6 | 4 | | | 0 | 0 | | | | | | | 0 | 10 |
| Gampaha | WE | 11 | 7 | | | 0 | | | | | | | | | 18 |
| Hambantota | SO | 4 | 2 | | | 1 | 0 | | 0 | | | | | 0 | 7 |
| Jaffna | NE | | | 1 | | | | 0 | | | 9 | 0 | | | 10 |
| Kalutara | WE | 6 | 4 | | | 0 | 0 | | | | | | | 0 | 10 |
| Kandy | CE | 5 | 7 | | | 0 | 0 | | 0 | | | | | | 12 |
| Kegalle | SA | 4 | 5 | | | 0 | | | | | | | | | 9 |
| Kurunegala | NW | 8 | 7 | | | 0 | 0 | | | | | | | | 15 |
| Matale | CE | 3 | 2 | | | 0 | | | 0 | | | | | | 5 |
| Matara | SO | 5 | 3 | | | 0 | 0 | | | | | | | | 8 |
| Monaragala | UV | 3 | 2 | | | 0 | | | 0 | | | | | | 5 |
| Nuwara Eliya | CE | 2 | 5 | | | 0 | 0 | | | 1 | | | | | 8 |
| Polonnaruwa | NC | 3 | 2 | | | 0 | | | | | | | | | 5 |
| Puttalam | NW | 4 | 3 | | | 0 | 0 | | | | | | | | 7 |
| Ratnapura | SA | 6 | 4 | | | 0 | 0 | | 0 | | | | | | 10 |
| Trincomalee | NE | 0 | 2 | 1 | 1 | 0 | | 0 | 0 | | | 0 | | | 4 |
| Vanni | NE | 1 | 1 | 1 | 0 | | | 3 | 0 | | | 0 | 0 | | 6 |
| National List | | 14 | 13 | 1 | 1 | 0 | 0 | 0 | 0 | 0 | 0 | 0 | 0 | 0 | 29 |
| Total | | 105 | 94 | 7 | 5 | 1 | 0 | 3 | 0 | 1 | 9 | 0 | 0 | 0 | 225 |

1. EROS contested as an independent group in four districts (Batticaloa, Jaffna, Trincomalee and Vanni). 1. The EROS/PLOTE/TELO alliance contested as TELO in Ampara District, Batticaloa District, Colombo District and Trincomalee District; as DPLF in Vanni District; and as in an independent group in Jaffna District. 2. UCPF contested as an independent group in Nuwara Eliya District. 3. EPDP contested as an independent group in Jaffna District.

== See also ==
Results of the 1994 Sri Lankan general election by province
