= Balanadarajah Iyer =

Tamil activist, writer and poet of Sri Lanka

Balanadarasan
- Born: Balanadarajah Iyer; 6 June 1957; Urelu, Jaffna
- Died: 16 August 2004 (aged 47); Colombo, Sri Lanka
- Occupations: Journalist, Author, Tamil activist
- Notable work: Thimbu Muthal Tokyo Varai

Kandasamy Iyer Balanadarajah Iyer (Balanadarasan), also known as Sinna Bala, (6 June 1957 – 16 August 2004) was a Sri Lankan Tamil activist, writer and poet who was a media secretary and a senior member of the Eelam People's Democratic Party.

== Personal life ==
Balanadarasan was born on June 6, 1957, in Urelu Jaffna to a Teacher named N. Kandasamy Iyer and his wife Ambigai Amma. Balanadarasan was the second of seven children. He is a member of Jaffna's Tamil Brahmin community. Yalpanam N. Veeramani Iyer (well known Sri Lankan Carnatic Music Composer and a Dance lecturer) is the paternal uncle to Balanadarasan. Bala was married to Jegatheswary Balanadarasan (Ranjana) Daughter of well known Hindu Priest Somasundara Kurukal and his wife Puvaneshwaray in 1990 October 31 and has three daughters. He began his political activities in 1972 at the age of 15 by opposing discrimination against Tamils with the Tamil Students Organization .

== Political life ==
He became a leader of the Eelam Revolutionary Organisation of Students and worked for the Sri Lankan Tamil nationalist movement, advocating for the liberation of Tamils from the Government of Sri Lanka. He was a comrade of the founder of EROS, Ratnasabapathy. After the Eelam Revolutionary Organisation of Students merged with the Liberation Tigers of Tamil Eelam, he left EROS and the LTTE. He then joined the Eelam People's Democratic Party and worked with founder Douglas Devananda to promote the rights of Jaffna Tamils and Eastern Tamils. He also contested the 2000, 2001 and 2004 elections in Jaffna unsuccessfully for the EPDP. He took part in Timbu talks along with Vellupilai Balakumaran and Shankar Raji.

== Writing ==
Balanadarasan was the publisher of Tharkeegam, the mouthpiece of the Eelam People's Democratic Party. He was also a member of the editorial board for Ellanatham (News Paper for Tamils). He utilized the pseudonym "Ilaiyavan" when writing his books such as veedu, Kaniuruthi, Porkalam, Malaiyaitharatha vanam and the well known political book "Thimbu Muthal Tokyo Varai"

== Death ==
On August 16, 2004, he was gunned down in Colombo by gunmen believed to be members of the Liberation Tigers of Tamil Eelam. Iyer and an associate were killed by two men on motorcycles who shot at him with pistols. Iyer was shot in the face and chest. His murder was the second major murder of a journalist in Sri Lanka in 2004
