= Eelam National Liberation Front =

Sri Lankan Tamil militant organization

The Eelam National Liberation Front (ENLF) was a short-lived (1984–1986) umbrella organisation organizing Sri Lankan Tamil militant groups.

== History ==
In April 1984 M. Karunanidhi invited the leaders of the five leading Tamil militant groups, Eelam People's Revolutionary Liberation Front (EPRLF), Eelam Revolutionary Organisation of Students (EROS), Liberation Tigers of Tamil Eelam (LTTE), People's Liberation Organisation of Tamil Eelam (PLOTE) and Tamil Eelam Liberation Organization (TELO), for talks aimed at uniting the groups. K. Pathmanabha (EPRLF), V. Balakumaran (EROS) and Sri Sabaratnam (TELO) accepted the invitation but Velupillai Prabhakaran (LTTE) and Uma Maheswaran (PLOTE) did not.

Shortly afterward EPRLF, EROS and TELO formed the Eelam National Liberation Front. Its inaugural meeting was held at the EPRLF's office in Madras (now Chennai) and Ramesh of the EPRLF was elected the secretary. After the meeting Pathmanabha, Balakumaran and Sri Sabaratnam issued a statement announcing the formation of the ENLF:

Realizing that unity among the liberation movements is essential to take forward the freedom struggle of the people of Tamil Eelam, the leaders of the Eelam Progressive Revolutionary Liberation Front, Tamil Eelam Liberation Organization and Eelam Revolutionary Organization have decided to form a united front and name it Eelam National Liberation Front.

Although ENLF members would work together to achieve their common aim they would each maintain their own distinct identity. Other major liberation groups i.e., LTTE and PLOTE, were invited to join.

=== LTTE ===
In early 1985 Prabhakaran decided to join. On 10 April 1985 senior members of the ENLF and LTTE met at the Hotel Presidency, Chennai|Madras. Those attending the meeting were: LTTE — Prabhakaran, Rajanayagam and Anton Balasingham; EPRLF — Pathmanabha, Kulasegaran and Ramesh; EROS — Balakumaran and Muhilan; TELO — Sri Sabaratnam and Mathi. After the meeting a statement was issued:

The Eelam National Liberation Front and the Liberation Tigers of Tamil Eelam have decided to work together to take forward the freedom struggle of the Tamil-speaking people of Eelam...The emergence of unity among these four freedom movements that have adopted the path of armed revolution is a significant event in the history of the freedom struggle of the Tamil people. This unity, a turning point in the freedom struggle of the Tamil people of Eelam, has helped the consolidation of the revolutionary forces and coordinates and strengthens the armed struggle. We expect the news about the unity among the armed movements would gladden and enthuse the people who are enduring army atrocities and hardships and intensify their determination and resolve to march on the path of freedom.

ENLF members agreed to make joint political decisions and to coordinate military actions.

=== Dissolution ===
In February 1986, the LTTE pulled out. By April 1986, ENLF had become defunct.

== Objectives ==
=== Initial ===
- Winning independence from the domination of Sri Lanka
- Pledge to work for the full independence of Tamil Eelam and nothing less
- Adopt armed struggle
- Build a socialist society in Tamil Eelam
- Eject the shackles of American imperialism and neocolonialism

The ENLF members agreed to coordinate armed activities against the Sri Lanka Armed Forces; unify propaganda conducted in foreign countries; and create a unified body to administer the funds collected from individuals and institutions.

=== Ultimate ===
- Winning freedom and sovereignty from Sri Lanka
- Reject anything less than an independent state with the right to self-determination
- Adopt mass armed struggle
- Advance the socialist revolution along with the freedom struggle and build a socialist society
- Escape global imperialism and neocolonialism and adopt nonalignment
