= Pragasam =

Name list

Pragasam is a name of Tamil origin derived from the Sanskrit word "prakasha" meaning light. Notable people with this surname include:

- Arul Pragasam (1948–2019), Tamil activist
- Darren Rahul Pragasam (born 1999), Malaysian squash player
