= Results of the 1989 Sri Lankan general election by province =

Results of the 1989 Sri Lankan general election by province.

== Number of votes ==
Province	UNP	SLFP	EROS^{1}	SLMC	ENDLF EPRLF TELO TULF	USA	MEP	ULPP	DPLF	ACTC	Ind	Valid Votes	Rejected Votes	Total Polled	Registered Electors	Turnout %
Central	403,695	198,822		16,417		11,705		3,665	10,509			644,813	47,901	692,714	1,072,774	64.57%
North Central	136,199	87,231				2,841	531	3,330			4,057	234,189	19,511	253,700	497,818	50.96%
North Eastern	110,352	74,064	229,877	132,460	188,594	965	284		7,993	7,610	1,497	753,696	59,193	812,889	1,368,289	59.41%
North Western	454,033	267,213		6,253		14,457	2,848	14,896			691	760,391	47,417	807,808	1,103,746	73.19%
Sabaragamuwa	370,657	204,028				32,491	1,028	15,393			779	624,376	38,610	662,986	894,355	74.13%
Southern	261,335	203,307		4,157		24,071	4,637	5,578				503,085	33,003	536,088	1,318,192	40.67%
Uva	181,402	119,651		450		7,861	2,144	5,589			349	317,446	32,021	349,467	491,248	71.14%
Western	920,332	631,053		42,279		65,880	79,656	19,272				1,758,472	87,907	1,846,379	2,627,742	70.26%
Total	2,838,005	1,785,369	229,877	202,016	188,594	160,271	91,128	67,723	18,502	7,610	7,373	5,596,468	365,563	5,962,031	9,374,164	63.60%

1. EROS contested as an independent group in four districts (Batticaloa, Jaffna, Trincomalee and Vanni).

== Percentage of votes ==
Province	UNP	SLFP	EROS^{1}	SLMC	ENDLF EPRLF TELO TULF	USA	MEP	ULPP	DPLF	ACTC	Ind	Total
Central	62.61%	30.83%		2.55%		1.82%		0.57%	1.63%			100.00%
North Central	58.16%	37.25%				1.21%	0.23%	1.42%			1.73%	100.00%
North Eastern	14.64%	9.83%	30.50%	17.57%	25.02%	0.13%	0.04%		1.06%	1.01%	0.20%	100.00%
North Western	59.71%	35.14%		0.82%		1.90%	0.37%	1.96%			0.09%	100.00%
Sabaragamuwa	59.36%	32.68%				5.20%	0.16%	2.47%			0.12%	100.00%
Southern	51.95%	40.41%		0.83%		4.78%	0.92%	1.11%				100.00%
Uva	57.14%	37.69%		0.14%		2.48%	0.68%	1.76%			0.11%	100.00%
Western	52.34%	35.89%		2.40%		3.75%	4.53%	1.10%				100.00%
Total	50.71%	31.90%	4.11%	3.61%	3.37%	2.86%	1.63%	1.21%	0.33%	0.14%	0.13%	100.00%

1. EROS contested as an independent group in four districts (Batticaloa, Jaffna, Trincomalee and Vanni).

== Seats ==
Province	UNP	SLFP	EROS^{1}	SLMC	ENDLF EPRLF TELO TULF	USA	MEP	ULPP	DPLF	ACTC	Ind	Total
Central	16	7		0		0		0	0			23
North Central	9	4				0	0	0			0	13
North Eastern	5	2	12	3	9	0	0		0	0	0	31
North Western	15	7		0		0	0	0			0	22
Sabaragamuwa	12	5				2	0	0			0	19
Southern	17	10		0		0	0	0				27
Uva	8	5		0		0	0	0			0	13
Western	28	18		0		0	2	0				48
National List	15	9	1	1	1	1	1	0	0	0	0	29
Total	125	67	13	4	10	3	3	0	0	0	0	225

1. EROS contested as an independent group in four districts (Batticaloa, Jaffna, Trincomalee and Vanni).

== See also ==
Results of the 1989 Sri Lankan general election by electoral district
