= Kayts Polling Division =

Kayts
- Polling Division
- Coordinates: 9.624265°N 79.844298°E
- Country: Sri Lanka
- Province: Northern Province, Sri Lanka
- Electoral District: Jaffna Electoral District

Area
  - Total: 199.9 km^{2} (77.2 sq mi)

Population (2012)
  - Total: 40,018
  - Density: 200/km^{2} (520/sq mi)
- ISO 3166 code: EC-10A

The Kayts Polling Division is a Polling Division in the Jaffna Electoral District, in the Northern Province, Sri Lanka.

== Presidential Election Results ==
=== Summary ===
The winner of Kayts has matched the final country result 5 out of 8 times. Hence, Kayts is a Weak Bellwether for Presidential Elections.

| Year | Kayts | Jaffna Electoral District | MAE % | Sri Lanka | MAE % |
|---|---|---|---|---|---|
| 2019 | NDF | NDF | 12.53% | SLPP | 29.69% |
| 2015 | NDF | NDF | 18.19% | NDF | 5.48% |
| 2010 | UPFA | NDF | 20.69% | UPFA | 6.92% |
| 2005 | UPFA | UNP | 30.11% | UPFA | 6.71% |
| 1999 | UNP | PA | 2.83% | PA | 5.45% |
| 1994 | PA | PA | 0.78% | PA | 34.43% |
| 1988 | UNP | SLFP | 6.88% | UNP | 16.43% |
| 1982 | ACTC | ACTC | 10.72% | UNP | 23.23% |
| Matches/Mean MAE | 5/8 | 3/8 | 12.84% | 8/8 | 16.04% |

=== 2019 Sri Lankan Presidential Election ===
| Party | Kayts | | Jaffna Electoral District | | Sri Lanka | |
| Party | Votes | % | Votes | % | Votes | % |
|---|---|---|---|---|---|---|
| NDF | 11,319 | 69.82% | 312,722 | 83.86% | 5,564,239 | 41.99% |
| SLPP | 2,917 | 17.99% | 23,261 | 6.24% | 6,924,255 | 52.25% |
| Other Parties (with < 1%) | 1,370 | 8.45% | 23,295 | 6.25% | 717,212 | 5.41% |
| DUNF | 382 | 2.36% | 6,790 | 1.82% | 34,537 | 0.26% |
| IND10 | 223 | 1.38% | 6,845 | 1.84% | 12,256 | 0.09% |
| Valid Votes | 16,211 | 97.13% | 372,913 | 97.07% | 13,252,499 | 98.99% |
| Rejected Votes | 479 | 2.87% | 11,251 | 2.93% | 135,452 | 1.01% |
| Total Polled | 16,690 | 73.68% | 384,164 | 68.00% | 13,387,951 | 83.71% |
| Registered Electors | 22,651 | | 564,984 | | 15,992,568 | |

=== 2015 Sri Lankan Presidential Election ===
| Party | Kayts | | Jaffna Electoral District | | Sri Lanka | |
| Party | Votes | % | Votes | % | Votes | % |
|---|---|---|---|---|---|---|
| NDF | 8,144 | 55.48% | 253,574 | 74.42% | 6,217,162 | 51.28% |
| UPFA | 5,959 | 40.60% | 74,454 | 21.85% | 5,768,090 | 47.58% |
| Other Parties (with < 1%) | 575 | 3.92% | 12,723 | 3.73% | 138,200 | 1.14% |
| Valid Votes | 14,678 | 96.74% | 340,751 | 97.14% | 12,123,452 | 98.85% |
| Rejected Votes | 495 | 3.26% | 10,038 | 2.86% | 140,925 | 1.15% |
| Total Polled | 15,173 | 68.79% | 350,789 | 64.22% | 12,264,377 | 78.69% |
| Registered Electors | 22,057 | | 546,265 | | 15,585,942 | |

=== 2010 Sri Lankan Presidential Election ===
| Party | Kayts | | Jaffna Electoral District | | Sri Lanka | |
| Party | Votes | % | Votes | % | Votes | % |
|---|---|---|---|---|---|---|
| UPFA | 4,611 | 46.19% | 44,154 | 24.75% | 6,015,934 | 57.88% |
| NDF | 3,976 | 39.83% | 113,877 | 63.84% | 4,173,185 | 40.15% |
| Other Parties (with < 1%) | 549 | 5.50% | 9,128 | 5.12% | 106,050 | 1.02% |
| Ind 5 | 284 | 2.84% | 3,205 | 1.80% | 9,662 | 0.09% |
| DUNF | 283 | 2.83% | 3,370 | 1.89% | 39,226 | 0.38% |
| UDF | 144 | 1.44% | 3,325 | 1.86% | 23,290 | 0.22% |
| JSP | 136 | 1.36% | 1,310 | 0.73% | 26,266 | 0.25% |
| Valid Votes | 9,983 | 96.73% | 178,369 | 96.35% | 10,393,613 | 99.03% |
| Rejected Votes | 338 | 3.27% | 6,763 | 3.65% | 101,838 | 0.97% |
| Total Polled | 10,321 | 19.43% | 185,132 | 25.15% | 10,495,451 | 66.70% |
| Registered Electors | 53,111 | | 736,032 | | 15,734,587 | |

=== 2005 Sri Lankan Presidential Election ===
| Party | Kayts | | Jaffna Electoral District | | Sri Lanka | |
| Party | Votes | % | Votes | % | Votes | % |
|---|---|---|---|---|---|---|
| UPFA | 139 | 52.85% | 1,967 | 25.00% | 4,887,152 | 50.29% |
| UNP | 98 | 37.26% | 5,523 | 70.20% | 4,706,366 | 48.43% |
| SEP | 10 | 3.80% | 29 | 0.37% | 3,500 | 0.04% |
| DUA | 4 | 1.52% | 31 | 0.39% | 5,082 | 0.05% |
| ULPP | 3 | 1.14% | 120 | 1.53% | 14,458 | 0.15% |
| USP | 3 | 1.14% | 72 | 0.92% | 35,425 | 0.36% |
| JSP | 3 | 1.14% | 34 | 0.43% | 31,238 | 0.32% |
| Other Parties (with < 1%) | 3 | 1.14% | 92 | 1.17% | 33,818 | 0.35% |
| Valid Votes | 263 | 95.29% | 7,868 | 92.30% | 9,717,039 | 98.88% |
| Rejected Votes | 13 | 4.71% | 656 | 7.70% | 109,869 | 1.12% |
| Total Polled | 276 | 0.52% | 8,524 | 1.20% | 9,826,908 | 69.51% |
| Registered Electors | 52,986 | | 707,970 | | 14,136,979 | |

=== 1999 Sri Lankan Presidential Election ===
| Party | Kayts | | Jaffna Electoral District | | Sri Lanka | |
| Party | Votes | % | Votes | % | Votes | % |
|---|---|---|---|---|---|---|
| UNP | 3,580 | 47.00% | 48,005 | 43.03% | 3,602,748 | 42.71% |
| PA | 3,377 | 44.34% | 52,043 | 46.65% | 4,312,157 | 51.12% |
| Other Parties (with < 1%) | 314 | 4.12% | 5,215 | 4.67% | 452,527 | 5.36% |
| LDA | 154 | 2.02% | 3,394 | 3.04% | 23,668 | 0.28% |
| Ind 2 | 108 | 1.42% | 1,873 | 1.68% | 27,052 | 0.32% |
| SLMP | 84 | 1.10% | 1,041 | 0.93% | 17,359 | 0.21% |
| Valid Votes | 7,617 | 94.79% | 111,568 | 94.91% | 8,435,754 | 97.69% |
| Rejected Votes | 419 | 5.21% | 5,981 | 5.09% | 199,536 | 2.31% |
| Total Polled | 8,036 | 15.79% | 117,549 | 19.15% | 8,635,290 | 72.17% |
| Registered Electors | 50,885 | | 613,718 | | 11,965,536 | |

=== 1994 Sri Lankan Presidential Election ===
| Party | Kayts | | Jaffna Electoral District | | Sri Lanka | |
| Party | Votes | % | Votes | % | Votes | % |
|---|---|---|---|---|---|---|
| PA | 14,761 | 97.16% | 16,934 | 96.35% | 4,709,205 | 62.28% |
| Ind 2 | 291 | 1.92% | 341 | 1.94% | 58,888 | 0.78% |
| Other Parties (with < 1%) | 141 | 0.93% | 300 | 1.71% | 2,793,435 | 36.94% |
| Valid Votes | 15,193 | 99.22% | 17,575 | 99.20% | 7,561,526 | 98.03% |
| Rejected Votes | 120 | 0.78% | 141 | 0.80% | 151,706 | 1.97% |
| Total Polled | 15,313 | 30.93% | 17,716 | 2.97% | 7,713,232 | 69.12% |
| Registered Electors | 49,504 | | 596,422 | | 11,158,880 | |

=== 1988 Sri Lankan Presidential Election ===
| Party | Kayts | | Jaffna Electoral District | | Sri Lanka | |
| Party | Votes | % | Votes | % | Votes | % |
|---|---|---|---|---|---|---|
| UNP | 4,628 | 37.34% | 33,650 | 28.03% | 2,569,199 | 50.43% |
| SLMP | 4,503 | 36.33% | 42,198 | 35.15% | 235,701 | 4.63% |
| SLFP | 3,264 | 26.33% | 44,197 | 36.82% | 2,289,857 | 44.95% |
| Valid Votes | 12,395 | 95.41% | 120,045 | 93.38% | 5,094,754 | 98.24% |
| Rejected Votes | 596 | 4.59% | 8,517 | 6.62% | 91,499 | 1.76% |
| Total Polled | 12,991 | 26.25% | 128,562 | 23.30% | 5,186,256 | 55.87% |
| Registered Electors | 49,481 | | 551,713 | | 9,283,143 | |

=== 1982 Sri Lankan Presidential Election ===
| Party | Kayts | | Jaffna Electoral District | | Sri Lanka | |
| Party | Votes | % | Votes | % | Votes | % |
|---|---|---|---|---|---|---|
| ACTC | 8,353 | 51.60% | 87,263 | 40.03% | 173,934 | 2.67% |
| UNP | 4,067 | 25.13% | 44,775 | 20.54% | 3,450,815 | 52.93% |
| SLFP | 3,393 | 20.96% | 77,210 | 35.42% | 2,546,348 | 39.05% |
| Other Parties (with < 1%) | 374 | 2.31% | 8,650 | 3.97% | 348,954 | 5.35% |
| Valid Votes | 16,187 | 94.50% | 218,003 | 95.36% | 6,520,156 | 98.78% |
| Rejected Votes | 943 | 5.50% | 10,610 | 4.64% | 80,470 | 1.22% |
| Total Polled | 17,130 | 40.25% | 228,613 | 45.86% | 6,600,626 | 80.15% |
| Registered Electors | 42,563 | | 498,545 | | 8,235,358 | |

== Parliamentary Election Results ==
=== Summary ===
The winner of Kayts has matched the final country result 1 out of 7 times.

| Year | Kayts | Jaffna Electoral District | MAE % | Sri Lanka | MAE % |
|---|---|---|---|---|---|
| 2015 | ITAK | ITAK | 10.33% | UNP | 38.98% |
| 2010 | UPFA | ITAK | 24.59% | UPFA | 15.19% |
| 2004 | ITAK | ITAK | 0.72% | UPFA | 6.11% |
| 2001 | EPDP | TULF | 32.61% | UNP | 21.22% |
| 2000 | EPDP | EPDP | 22.91% | PA | 14.96% |
| 1994 | IND2 | IND2 | 14.71% | PA | 0.23% |
| 1989 | INDI | INDI | 10.46% | UNP | 27.70% |
| Matches/Mean MAE | 1/7 | 0/7 | 16.62% | 7/7 | 17.77% |

=== 2015 Sri Lankan Parliamentary Election ===
| Party | Kayts | | Jaffna Electoral District | | Sri Lanka | |
| Party | Votes | % | Votes | % | Votes | % |
|---|---|---|---|---|---|---|
| ITAK | 7,688 | 58.98% | 207,577 | 70.08% | 515,963 | 4.63% |
| EPDP | 3,924 | 30.10% | 30,232 | 10.21% | 33,481 | 0.30% |
| UNP | 424 | 3.25% | 20,025 | 6.76% | 5,098,916 | 45.77% |
| UPFA | 421 | 3.23% | 17,309 | 5.84% | 4,732,664 | 42.48% |
| AITC | 329 | 2.52% | 15,022 | 5.07% | 18,644 | 0.17% |
| Other Parties (with < 1%) | 249 | 1.91% | 6,034 | 2.04% | 580,476 | 5.21% |
| Valid Votes | 13,035 | 89.79% | 296,199 | 90.91% | 11,140,333 | 95.35% |
| Rejected Votes | 1,389 | 9.57% | 25,496 | 7.83% | 516,926 | 4.42% |
| Total Polled | 14,518 | 65.82% | 325,805 | 61.56% | 11,684,111 | 77.66% |
| Registered Electors | 22,057 | | 529,239 | | 15,044,490 | |

=== 2010 Sri Lankan Parliamentary Election ===
| Party | Kayts | | Jaffna Electoral District | | Sri Lanka | |
| Party | Votes | % | Votes | % | Votes | % |
|---|---|---|---|---|---|---|
| UPFA | 6,441 | 72.12% | 47,622 | 32.20% | 4,846,388 | 60.38% |
| ITAK | 1,671 | 18.71% | 65,119 | 44.03% | 233,190 | 2.91% |
| UNP | 392 | 4.39% | 12,624 | 8.54% | 2,357,057 | 29.37% |
| Other Parties (with < 1%) | 323 | 3.62% | 16,171 | 10.93% | 496,010 | 6.18% |
| AITC | 104 | 1.16% | 6,362 | 4.30% | 7,544 | 0.09% |
| Valid Votes | 8,931 | 86.94% | 147,898 | 87.89% | 8,026,322 | 96.03% |
| Rejected Votes | 1,326 | 12.91% | 19,774 | 11.75% | 581,465 | 6.96% |
| Total Polled | 10,273 | 19.34% | 168,277 | 22.68% | 8,358,246 | 59.29% |
| Registered Electors | 53,111 | | 742,005 | | 14,097,690 | |

=== 2004 Sri Lankan Parliamentary Election ===
| Party | Kayts | | Jaffna Electoral District | | Sri Lanka | |
| Party | Votes | % | Votes | % | Votes | % |
|---|---|---|---|---|---|---|
| ITAK | 13,911 | 90.02% | 257,320 | 90.60% | 633,203 | 6.85% |
| EPDP | 1,406 | 9.10% | 18,612 | 6.55% | 24,942 | 0.27% |
| Other Parties (with < 1%) | 137 | 0.89% | 8,094 | 2.85% | 770,907 | 8.34% |
| Valid Votes | 15,454 | 92.34% | 284,026 | 93.04% | 9,241,931 | 94.52% |
| Rejected Votes | 1,282 | 7.66% | 21,233 | 6.96% | 534,452 | 5.47% |
| Total Polled | 16,736 | 32.24% | 305,259 | 46.65% | 9,777,821 | 75.74% |
| Registered Electors | 51,911 | | 654,415 | | 12,909,631 | |

=== 2001 Sri Lankan Parliamentary Election ===
| Party | Kayts | | Jaffna Electoral District | | Sri Lanka | |
| Party | Votes | % | Votes | % | Votes | % |
|---|---|---|---|---|---|---|
| EPDP | 15,378 | 74.71% | 57,208 | 30.66% | 72,783 | 0.81% |
| TULF | 4,304 | 20.91% | 102,324 | 54.84% | 348,164 | 3.89% |
| UNP | 764 | 3.71% | 16,245 | 8.71% | 4,086,026 | 45.62% |
| Other Parties (with < 1%) | 138 | 0.67% | 10,821 | 5.80% | 1,052,503 | 11.75% |
| Valid Votes | 20,584 | 96.36% | 186,598 | 94.59% | 8,955,844 | 94.77% |
| Rejected Votes | 777 | 3.64% | 10,681 | 5.41% | 494,009 | 5.23% |
| Total Polled | 21,361 | 41.83% | 197,279 | 31.14% | 9,449,878 | 76.03% |
| Registered Electors | 51,072 | | 633,457 | | 12,428,762 | |

=== 2000 Sri Lankan Parliamentary Election ===
| Party | Kayts | | Jaffna Electoral District | | Sri Lanka | |
| Party | Votes | % | Votes | % | Votes | % |
|---|---|---|---|---|---|---|
| EPDP | 12,311 | 79.68% | 41,536 | 36.13% | 50,702 | 0.59% |
| TULF | 1,327 | 8.59% | 32,761 | 28.50% | 105,907 | 1.23% |
| UNP | 820 | 5.31% | 10,896 | 9.48% | 3,451,765 | 40.12% |
| Other Parties (with < 1%) | 329 | 2.13% | 12,197 | 10.61% | 924,064 | 10.74% |
| IG6 | 275 | 1.78% | 2,058 | 1.79% | 3,162 | 0.04% |
| IG2 | 223 | 1.44% | 4,905 | 4.27% | 31,443 | 0.37% |
| ACTC | 166 | 1.07% | 10,618 | 9.24% | 27,289 | 0.32% |
| Valid Votes | 15,451 | N/A | 114,971 | N/A | 8,602,617 | N/A |

=== 1994 Sri Lankan Parliamentary Election ===
| Party | Kayts | | Jaffna Electoral District | | Sri Lanka | |
| Party | Votes | % | Votes | % | Votes | % |
|---|---|---|---|---|---|---|
| IND2 | 9,944 | 95.19% | 10,744 | 79.71% | 16,690 | 0.21% |
| EPRLF | 232 | 2.22% | 263 | 1.95% | 9,411 | 0.12% |
| IND1 | 214 | 2.05% | 374 | 2.77% | 48,199 | 0.61% |
| Other Parties (with < 1%) | 56 | 0.54% | 2,098 | 15.56% | 143,307 | 1.80% |
| Valid Votes | 10,446 | 97.19% | 13,479 | 97.41% | 7,943,688 | 95.20% |
| Rejected Votes | 302 | 2.81% | 358 | 2.59% | 400,395 | 4.80% |
| Total Polled | 10,748 | 21.71% | 13,837 | 2.32% | 8,344,095 | 74.75% |
| Registered Electors | 49,504 | | 596,375 | | 11,163,064 | |

=== 1989 Sri Lankan Parliamentary Election ===
| Party | Kayts | | Jaffna Electoral District | | Sri Lanka | |
| Party | Votes | % | Votes | % | Votes | % |
|---|---|---|---|---|---|---|
| INDI | 17,108 | 75.71% | 150,340 | 62.68% | 175,579 | 3.14% |
| TULF | 3,706 | 16.40% | 60,013 | 25.02% | 188,594 | 3.37% |
| DPLF | 572 | 2.53% | 7,993 | 3.33% | 19,150 | 0.34% |
| SLMC | 466 | 2.06% | 8,439 | 3.52% | 202,016 | 3.61% |
| ACTC | 391 | 1.73% | 7,610 | 3.17% | 7,610 | 0.14% |
| UNP | 354 | 1.57% | 5,460 | 2.28% | 2,838,005 | 50.71% |
| Valid Votes | 22,597 | 89.76% | 239,855 | 90.49% | 5,596,468 | 93.87% |
| Rejected Votes | 2,577 | 10.24% | 25,203 | 9.51% | 365,563 | 6.13% |
| Total Polled | 25,174 | 50.96% | 265,058 | 44.76% | 5,962,031 | 63.60% |
| Registered Electors | 49,401 | | 592,210 | | 9,374,164 | |

== Demographics ==
=== Ethnicity ===
The Kayts Polling Division has a Sri Lankan Tamil majority (98.5%) . In comparison, the Jaffna Electoral District (which contains the Kayts Polling Division) has a Sri Lankan Tamil majority (98.6%)

Ethnicity in Kayts
1. Sri Lankan Tamil (98.5%)
2. Other (1.50%)

=== Religion ===
The Kayts Polling Division has a Hindu majority (71.4%) and a significant Roman Catholic population (24.5%) . In comparison, the Jaffna Electoral District (which contains the Kayts Polling Division) has a Hindu majority (82.6%) and a significant Roman Catholic population (12.6%)

Religion in Kayts
1. Hindu (71.4%)
2. Roman Catholic (24.5%)
3. Other Christian (3.20%)
4. Other (0.90%)
