= Results of the 1989 Sri Lankan general election by electoral district =

Results of the 1989 Sri Lankan general election by electoral district.

== Number of votes ==
Electoral District	Province	UNP	SLFP	EROS^{1}	SLMC	ENDLF EPRLF TELO TULF	USA	MEP	ULPP	DPLF	ACTC	Ind	Valid Votes	Rejected Votes	Total Polled	Registered Electors	Turnout %
Ampara	NE	62,600	45,400		61,325	43,424	965						213,714	10,727	224,441	265,768	84.45%
Anuradhapura	NC	92,726	64,010				1,724	531	1,397			4,057	164,445	14,245	178,690	334,073	53.49%
Badulla	UV	135,089	81,011				5,712	1,693	5,589				229,094	19,704	248,798	329,321	75.55%
Batticaloa	NE	11,317	4,130	46,419	36,867	55,131						1,497	155,361	13,923	169,284	216,574	78.16%
Colombo	WE	374,530	205,053		29,308		31,873	76,966	7,112				724,842	35,271	760,113	1,087,891	69.87%
Galle	SO	183,962	152,096		4,014		18,160	2,676	4,097				365,005	23,536	388,541	571,146	68.03%
Gampaha	WE	385,733	294,490				21,665		10,549				712,437	32,497	744,934	969,658	76.82%
Hambantota	SO	31,639	22,459		143		1,686	648					56,575	4,339	60,914	295,120	20.64%
Jaffna	NE	5,460		150,340	8,439	60,013				7,993	7,610		239,855	25,203	265,058	592,210	44.76%
Kalutara	WE	160,069	131,510		12,971		12,342	2,690	1,611				321,193	20,139	341,332	570,193	59.86%
Kandy	CE	204,973	105,977		14,697		5,147		1,315				332,109	22,374	354,483	628,317	56.42%
Kegalle	SA	174,334	80,668				15,168	1,028	14,056				285,254	18,362	303,616	437,131	69.46%
Kurunegala	NW	314,724	195,526				11,059	2,848	13,759				537,916	34,212	572,128	784,991	72.88%
Matale	CE	88,869	45,717				2,344		2,350				139,280	11,927	151,207	214,938	70.35%
Matara	SO	45,734	28,752				4,225	1,313	1,481				81,505	5,128	86,633	451,926	19.17%
Monaragala	UV	46,313	38,640		450		2,149	451				349	88,352	12,317	100,669	161,927	62.17%
Nuwara Eliya	CE	109,853	47,128		1,720		4,214			10,509			173,424	13,600	187,024	229,519	81.49%
Polonnaruwa	NC	43,473	23,221				1,117		1,933				69,744	5,266	75,010	163,745	45.81%
Puttalam	NW	139,309	71,687		6,253		3,398		1,137			691	222,475	13,205	235,680	318,755	73.94%
Ratnapura	SA	196,323	123,360				17,323		1,337			779	339,122	20,248	359,370	457,224	78.60%
Trincomalee	NE	22,450	22,966	25,239	17,884	12,755		284					101,578	4,878	106,456	152,289	69.90%
Vanni	NE	8,525	1,568	7,879	7,945	17,271							43,188	4,462	47,650	141,448	33.69%
Total		2,838,005	1,785,369	229,877	202,016	188,594	160,271	91,128	67,723	18,502	7,610	7,373	5,596,468	365,563	5,962,031	9,374,164	63.60%

1. EROS contested as an independent group in four districts (Batticaloa, Jaffna, Trincomalee and Vanni).

== Percentage of votes ==
Electoral District	Province	UNP	SLFP	EROS^{1}	SLMC	ENDLF EPRLF TELO TULF	USA	MEP	ULPP	DPLF	ACTC	Ind	Total
Ampara	NE	29.29%	21.24%		28.69%	20.32%	0.45%						100.00%
Anuradhapura	NC	56.39%	38.92%				1.05%	0.32%	0.85%			2.47%	100.00%
Badulla	UV	58.97%	35.36%				2.49%	0.74%	2.44%				100.00%
Batticaloa	NE	7.28%	2.66%	29.88%	23.73%	35.49%						0.96%	100.00%
Colombo	WE	51.67%	28.29%		4.04%		4.40%	10.62%	0.98%				100.00%
Galle	SO	50.40%	41.67%		1.10%		4.98%	0.73%	1.12%				100.00%
Gampaha	WE	54.14%	41.34%				3.04%		1.48%				100.00%
Hambantota	SO	55.92%	39.70%		0.25%		2.98%	1.15%					100.00%
Jaffna	NE	2.28%		62.68%	3.52%	25.02%				3.33%	3.17%		100.00%
Kalutara	WE	49.84%	40.94%		4.04%		3.84%	0.84%	0.50%				100.00%
Kandy	CE	61.72%	31.91%		4.43%		1.55%		0.40%				100.00%
Kegalle	SA	61.12%	28.28%				5.32%	0.36%	4.93%				100.00%
Kurunegala	NW	58.51%	36.35%				2.06%	0.53%	2.56%				100.00%
Matale	CE	63.81%	32.82%				1.68%		1.69%				100.00%
Matara	SO	56.11%	35.28%				5.18%	1.61%	1.82%				100.00%
Monaragala	UV	52.42%	43.73%		0.51%		2.43%	0.51%				0.40%	100.00%
Nuwara Eliya	CE	63.34%	27.18%		0.99%		2.43%			6.06%			100.00%
Polonnaruwa	NC	62.33%	33.29%				1.60%		2.77%				100.00%
Puttalam	NW	62.62%	32.22%		2.81%		1.53%		0.51%			0.31%	100.00%
Ratnapura	SA	57.89%	36.38%				5.11%		0.39%			0.23%	100.00%
Trincomalee	NE	22.10%	22.61%	24.85%	17.61%	12.56%		0.28%					100.00%
Vanni	NE	19.74%	3.63%	18.24%	18.40%	39.99%							100.00%
Total		50.71%	31.90%	4.11%	3.61%	3.37%	2.86%	1.63%	1.21%	0.33%	0.14%	0.13%	100.00%

1. EROS contested as an independent group in four districts (Batticaloa, Jaffna, Trincomalee and Vanni).

== Seats ==
Electoral District	Province	UNP	SLFP	EROS^{1}	SLMC	ENDLF EPRLF TELO TULF	USA	MEP	ULPP	DPLF	ACTC	Ind	Total
Ampara	NE	3	1		1	1	0						6
Anuradhapura	NC	5	3				0	0	0			0	8
Badulla	UV	5	3				0	0	0				8
Batticaloa	NE	0	0	1	1	3						0	5
Colombo	WE	12	6		0		0	2	0				20
Galle	SO	6	5		0		0	0	0				11
Gampaha	WE	10	7				0		0				17
Hambantota	SO	5	2		0		0	0					7
Jaffna	NE	0		8	0	3				0	0		11
Kalutara	WE	6	5		0		0	0	0				11
Kandy	CE	8	4		0		0		0				12
Kegalle	SA	6	2				1	0	0				9
Kurunegala	NW	10	5				0	0	0				15
Matale	CE	4	1				0		0				5
Matara	SO	6	3				0	0	0				9
Monaragala	UV	3	2		0		0	0				0	5
Nuwara Eliya	CE	4	2		0		0			0			6
Polonnaruwa	NC	4	1				0		0				5
Puttalam	NW	5	2		0		0		0			0	7
Ratnapura	SA	6	3				1		0			0	10
Trincomalee	NE	1	1	2	0	0		0					4
Vanni	NE	1	0	1	1	2							5
National List		15	9	1	1	1	1	1	0	0	0	0	29
Total		125	67	13	4	10	3	3	0	0	0	0	225

1. EROS contested as an independent group in four districts (Batticaloa, Jaffna, Trincomalee and Vanni).

== See also ==
Results of the 1989 Sri Lankan general election by province
