= Disappearance of Stephan Sunthararaj =

2009 missing person case in Sri Lanka

Stephan Sunthararaj
- Born: Sinnavan Stephan Sunthararaj; Sri Lanka
- Status: Missing for 17 years
- Occupation: Child rights activist
- Known for: Mysterious disappearance

Sinnavan Stephan Sunthararaj was a child rights activist in Sri Lanka. He was the Project Manager of the Centre for Human Rights and Development and Coordinator for the Child Protection Unit of World Vision. He had reported on the pro government military Eelam People's Democratic Party's child prostitution racket in Malaysia and India with the help of corrupt Customs and Immigration officials.

He had provided information to the U.S. embassy in Colombo that: "Children are sold into slavery, usually boys to work camps and girls to prostitution rings, through EPDP's networks in India and Malaysia. Sunthararaj maintained that children are often smuggled out of the country with the help of a corrupt Customs and Immigration official at Bandaranaike International Airport in Colombo."

== Background ==
Stephan did his bachelor's degree in sociology from the Jaffna University. Later he worked as an Assistant Lecturer. Stephan later joined a position in World Vision (Child Protection). He married Vanitana and had children.

== Incident ==
Stephan was kidnapped just hours after he had been released from Sri Lankan police custody after he was exonerated by the court. He was kidnapped while he was travelling in his lawyer's car on 7 May 2009 and has been missing since.

== Reaction ==
The U.S. State Department report on Sri Lanka in 2011 said: "There was no progress in solving the 2009 disappearance of Stephen Sunthararaj, project manager at the Center for Human Rights and Development. Sunthararaj was held by police without charges beginning in February of that year and was abducted by four persons in a white van wearing army uniforms shortly after he was released on a court order."

== See also ==
- List of people who disappeared mysteriously (2000–present)
