= Kali Arulpragasam =

British jewellery designer

- Occupations: Jewelry designer, artist
- Father: Arul Pragasam
- Relatives: Mathangi Arulpragasam (sister)

Kali Arulpragasam is a British jewellery designer and artist based in London. She is the founder and creative director of the artistic jewellery label Super Fertile, founded in 2006. She is the daughter of revolutionary Arul Pragasam and elder sister of British musician M.I.A.

== Super Fertile ==
Arulpragasam's designs with Super Fertile are politically conscious in form, influenced by social realism, the environment and nations torn by war. Her latest line "Tourism (Terrorism affects Tourism)" features signature oversized silver- and gold-plated necklaces, shaped like murals, using countries such as Haiti, Iraq, Sri Lanka, Afghanistan and Sudan as themes. This collection features a series of breastplate necklaces that hang below the navel and celebrate the positive aspects of war-torn nations.

Iraq's shows fruit, a mosque, and a tower at Samarra, Sudan's shows cows and fishermen, Sri Lanka's depicts a boat, palm trees and a peacock, whilst Israel's shows horses, temples and laughing men and women.

The ornaments, hand-cut, were made "to be huge, so you could see them across the room." She says “There’s more to these countries than guys with guns standing in rubble... What are the plants like? What music are the kids listening to? That’s what I wanted to show.” Arulpragasam plans to donate each respective necklace design to museums of their corresponding countries.
