= Shankar Rajee =

- Born: N. Thirunesan; 11 November 1949
- Died: 10 January 2005 (aged 55)
- Occupation: Engineer
- Organization: Eelam Revolutionary Organisation of Students

Nesadurai Thirunesan (11 November 1949 – 10 January 2005; commonly known by the nom-de-guerre Shankar Rajee) was a Sri Lankan Tamil militant and one of the founders of the Eelam Revolutionary Organisation of Students.

== Early life ==
Thirunesan was born on 11 November 1949. He was from Urumpirai in northern Ceylon. He was the son of Manickam Nesadurai and Potkodi. Thirunesan grew up in the Ceylonese capital Colombo. He and his family were victims of the 1958 riots. The family, like many of the Tamil victims of the riots, were shipped off to the northern Tamil areas of the country. In 1966 the family decided to move back to Colombo but Thirunesan didn't want to go, choosing instead to go to study in the UK. In London he studied agricultural engineering and automobile engineering.

Thirunesan married Nirmala (Rani). They had one son, Nesan and two daughters, Rajini and Niranjini.

== Militant ==
Thirunesan worked as an engineer for Ford in London. Whilst in London, Thirunesan, along with V. Balakumaran, Balanadarajah Iyer and E. Ratnasabapathy, founded the Eelam Revolutionary Organisation of Students (EROS), one of the earliest Tamil militant groups, in 1975. Thirunesan took on the nom-de-guerre Shankar Rajee. As head of EROS' military wing, Shankar Rajee established contact with Palestinian militant groups and arranged for prominent Tamil militants, such as Uma Maheswaran, to receive military training from the Palestinians. He was on the CIA’s Most Wanted List and took part in the October 1984 bombing in Colombo, the first bombing in Colombo during the Sri Lankan civil war. Shankar Rajee represented EROS at the India-mediated peace talks in Thimphu in 1985.

== Paramilitary ==
Following the withdrawal of the Indian Peace Keeping Force from Sri Lanka in 1990 and the eruption of war the Liberation Tigers of Tamil Eelam, the main Tamil militant group, ordered the EROS to disband or join the LTTE. Balakumaran, the EROS leader, and most EROS members chose to join the LTTE. Other EROS members left Sri Lanka but a few, led by Shankar Rajee and Sudha Master, chose to continue running the EROS from the relative safety of the Sri Lankan capital Colombo. EROS transformed itself into pro-government, anti-LTTE paramilitary group and a political party. It formed alliances with other government backed paramilitary groups such as the Eelam People's Democratic Party (EPDP).

Shankar Rajee lived in Madras, India so Sudha Master ran the EROS operations in Colombo. Shankar Rajee was arrested in Madras 1997 for smuggling foreign currency out of India and spent a year in jail. After returning to Sri Lanka he served as a "consultant" to the state-owned Sri Lanka Cashew Corporation which comes under the control of government minister Douglas Devananda, leader of the EPDP.

Shankar Rajee died on 10 January 2005 as a result of a massive heart attack. The EROS leadership was taken over by his son Nesan (aka Nesan Shankar Rajee).
