= Democratic Tamil National Front =

Democratic Tamil National Front ஜனநாயக தமிழ்த் தேசிய முன்னணி
- Leader: V. Anandasangaree
- Founded: 4 May 2016
- Parliament: 0 / 225

The Democratic Tamil National Front (Tamil: ஜனநாயக தமிழ்த் தேசிய முன்னணி; DTNF) was a Sri Lankan political alliance that sought to represent the Sri Lankan Tamils. It was formed in 2016 by the Eelam People's Democratic Party (EPDP), Tamil United Liberation Front (TULF) and several other Tamil organisations.

== History ==
The Democratic Tamil National Front was officially launched on 4 May 2016 in Colombo. The alliance consists of several organisations including Democratic People’s Congress (led by P. Ganesan), Eelam People's Democratic Party (led by Douglas Devananda), Eelam Revolutionary Organisation of Students, International Hindu Priests Organisation, Organisation for Democracy Reform, Tamil Eelam Liberation Organization (Sri wing) and Tamil United Liberation Front (led by V. Anandasangaree). The aim of the alliance is to win the rights of the Tamil people as the Tamil National Alliance (TNA), which has dominated Tamil politics since it was formed in 2001, had failed to resolve the Tamil people's problems.

The new alliance has given contradictory statements on solving Sri Lanka's ethnic problems. At its launch the alliance claimed that it would campaign for the "Indian model of federalism" in Sri Lanka and expansion of the Thirteenth Amendment. However, TULF leader Anandasangaree has said that the alliance would reject a "federal solution". The alliance has also been contradictory on its relationship with the TNA, saying that it would target and weaken the TNA but also that it was not against the TNA.
