= Eliyathamby Ratnasabapathy =

Sri Lankan Tamil militant and political leader

Eliyathamby Ratnasabapathy (November 3, 1938 – December 12, 2006) was one of the founding member of the Eelam Revolutionary Organization of Students and a noted Marxist-Leninist political leader.

== Biography and political career ==
He was born in a small town called Inuvil in the Jaffna peninsula in the minority Sri Lankan Tamil dominated north of Sri Lanka. He migrated to the United Kingdom when Sri Lanka was in the midst of its early stages of its ethnic conflict.

Eelam Revolutionary Organization of Students (EROS) was founded on January 3, 1975, at Wandsworth, London, in the residence of Eliyathamby Ratnasabapathy. It was led by a unified command of three persons: Ratnasabapathy, Shankar Rajee and Velupillai Balakumar. EROS through its contacts with PLO sent many people including one Arul Pragasam who became a leader of EROS to be trained in guerilla tactics in Lebanon.

It was later alleged that it was George Habash's PFLP not the PLO that trained the early batch of Tamil militants from Sri Lanka. He contested the parliamentary elections in 1989 and was elected to the Sri Lankan Parliament along with nine other members of EROS, but later resigned.

He died in London at age 68 after a long illness.

== Reactions ==
In a tribute to Mr. Ratnasabapathy, the Tamil Information Center (TIC) in London said:

Friends and colleagues describe him as a person steeped in communist ideals and as a visionary leader who campaigned resolutely throughout the major part of his life. Many members of the various Tamil militant groups regard him as a pioneer in the Tamil struggle for equality and justice and look upon him with great respect.

== See also ==
- Sri Lankan civil war
- Human Rights in Sri Lanka
- State terrorism in Sri Lanka
- Black July pogrom
