= Freedom People's Front =

Political party in Sri Lanka

- Leader: Dr Nalaka Godahewa
- Registered: 30 December 2022 (3 years ago)
- Headquarters: Liberty Plaza, Colombo
- Ideology: Anti-corruption; Anti-nepotism
- National affiliation: FPA
- Parliament of Sri Lanka: 0 / 225
- Local Government: 2 / 7,842

Election symbol
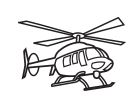
- Helicopter

The Freedom People's Front (abbreviated FPF; Sinhala: නිදහස් ජනතා පෙරමුණ Nidahas Janathā Peramuna; Tamil: சுதந்திர மக்கள் முன்னணி Cutantira Makkaḷ Muṉṉaṇi) is a Sri Lankan political party founded by Dr Nalaka Godahewa as the Bahujana Viyath Peramuna. The party has existed since 2018 but was officially registered by the Election Commission of Sri Lanka only in December 2022. Since then, the party is recognized as one of the 12 constituent parties of the Freedom People's Alliance formed alongside the Sri Lanka Freedom Party (SLFP) in January 2023.

The party founder and leader, Dr. Godahewa, is also a member a group of MPs who broke ranks with then government SLPP, the incumbent ruling party of Sri Lanka, in 2022. Both parties are members of the Freedom People's Alliance.
