= Nalaka Godahewa =

Sri Lankan businessman

Dr Nalaka Godahewa
- නාලක ගොඩහේවා நாலக கொடஹேவா
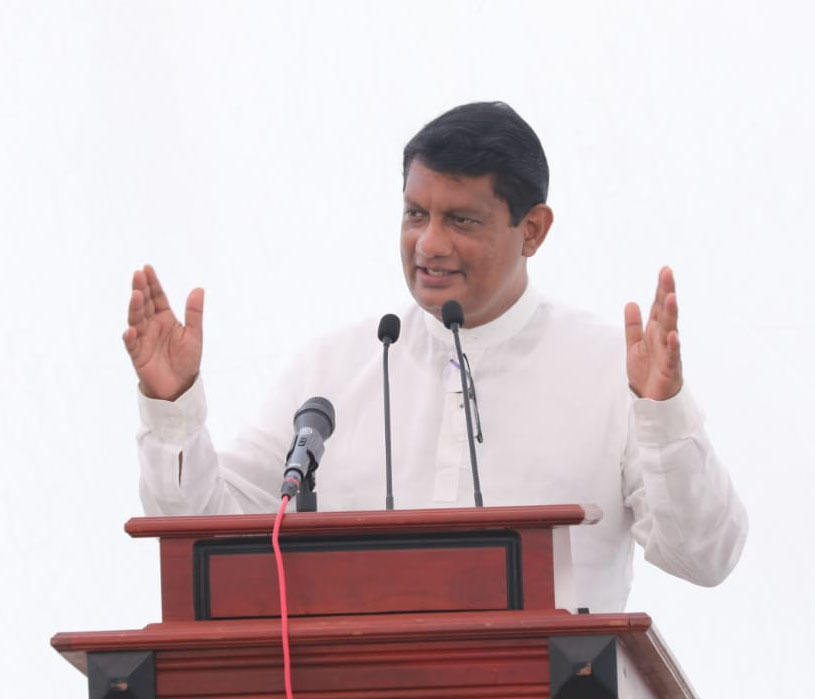

Former Minister of Mass Media
- In office 18 April 2022 – 9 May 2022
- President: Gotabaya Rajapaksa
- Prime Minister: Mahinda Rajapaksa
- Preceded by: Dullas Alahapperuma
- Succeeded by: Bandula Gunawardane

Member of Parliament for Gampaha District
- In office 20 August 2020 – 24 September 2024
- Majority: 325,479 votes

State Minister of Urban Development
- In office 20 August 2020 – 18 April 2022
- President: Gotabaya Rajapaksa
- Prime Minister: Mahinda Rajapaksa

Personal details
- Born: 7 June 1965 (age 61) Sri Lanka
- Party: Nidahasa Janatha Peramuna (since 2022)
- Other political affiliations: Freedom People's Alliance (since 2022) Nidahasa Janatha Sabha (since 2022) Sri Lanka Podujana Peramuna (2019–2022)
- Education: Ananda Maha Vidyalaya, Colombo 10
- Occupation: Politician, Chairman

Nalaka Godahewa, (Sinhala: නාලක ගොඩහේවා, Tamil: நாலக கொடஹேவா, born 7 June 1965) is a Sri Lankan business executive and a former Cabinet Minister. He was appointed as the Minister of Mass Media on 18 April 2022. Prior to that he was the State Minister Urban Development since August 2020 He was a member of parliament for the Gampaha District during August 2020 - September 2024 period . He had served as the Chairman, Securities Exchange Commission (August 2012–January 2015); Chairman, Sri Lanka Tourism (2010–2012); and Managing Director, Sri Lanka Insurance (2006–2009).

At the first election he faced after entering politics, Dr Nalaka Godahewa topped the preferential votes in the Gampaha District obtaining 325,479 votes He was ranked 3rd in the entire country in terms of the number of votes received by a candidate at the 2020 general election

Before entering politics his last state sector involvement was as the Chairman of the Securities Exchange Commission of Sri Lanka during 2012 -2015 period. Godahewa was appointed as SEC Chairman in mid 2012 after two of his predecessors, Indrani Sugathadasa and Thilak Karunaratne, had to resign within 12 months as a result of a stock market crisis during April 2011 to August 2012. According to Bloomberg statistics, within the first few weeks of Godahewa's appointment as SEC head, the market bounced back from world's worst performing stock market status to the third best performing stock market status. This prompted the business newspaper Daily FT to carry a headline "From Bust to Boom". In November 2012 Godahewa presented a three-year roadmap for capital market development in Sri Lanka. which was endorsed by key industry stakeholders as a timely, positive step in the right direction. By January 2014 Godahewa was in a position to publicly claim that "Foundation laid; time for other stakeholders to deliver" The all share price index of the Colombo Stock Exchange (CSE) had reached 7500 and was performing above all regional and global indices when Godahewa announced in January 2015 the vision and strategies for the market capitalization to USD 100Bn by 2020

== Education ==
At University of Moratuwa – With Electronics & Telecommunication Engineering final year batch 1991

Educated at Ananda College, Godahewa entered the engineering faculty of University of Moratuwa in 1986. He graduated with a BSc Honours degree in Electronics and Telecommunication Engineering from University of Moratuwa. He holds a LLB(Hons) degree from Buckinghamshire New University and an MBA from the PIM of University of Sri Jayewardenepura as well. He has received a PhD in Economics from the University of South Australia in 2008 Godahewa is also a Fellow of the Chartered Institute of Marketing of UK, and a Fellow of the Chartered Institute of Management Accountants of UK. His PhD thesis was on "Market orientation and the performance of Sri Lankan apparel manufacturers in the post MFA environment". He began his career quite late, having lost two years since completing A/L due to the long backlog in entering universities and two more years due to JVP insurgency in the late 1980s.

== Early career ==
He started his career at Unilever Ceylon as a management trainee, and within less than 10 years, Godahewa became the youngest CEO Offshore Operations of MAS Holdings, an exporter of apparel products to international brands such as Victoria's Secret Stores, Nike, Gap and Marks & Spencer. He managed several overseas operations for MAS Holdings in countries such as Vietnam, Madagascar Indonesia and India gaining experience in setting up international joint venture partnerships. He has served both in private sector and public sector.

== Public enterprise ==
=== Sri Lanka Insurance ===
The year 2009 was a critical year for the insurance company Sri Lanka Insurance corporation. As a result of a Supreme court order the largest insurance company in the country was handed over from private sector to the Government. Customer confidence was falling rapidly and unions were gaining upper hand. This was the time financial institutions across borders were collapsing due to world financial crisis. A crisis at the Sri Lanka Insurance Cooperation would was triggered a chain reaction in Sri Lanka too. Godahewa was appointed as competent authority of Sri Lanka Insurance in June 2009 with the task of handling the company affairs. Subsequently, appointed as the managing Director of Sri Lanka Insurance, Godahewa, restructured the company within a very short period of time and posted some of the best financial results with the revenue growth of over 30%. He was instrumental in launching the new advertising campaign of Sri Lanka Insurance 'Like Father Like Mother ( Piyekumen, Mawakemen)’ in 2009 highlighting the two core strengths of Sri Lanka insurance of having the government protection and private sector type service standards. He also rebranded life and motor insurance products of SLIC making both categories the fastest growing insurance brands in the market. During his tenure as Managing Director, Sri Lanka Insurance made several strategic investments which were also resulted in substantial unrealized capital gains to the company. These investments included buying controlling stakes of NDB Bank, Seylan Bank and Hatton National Bank. Under his leadership Sri Lanka Insurance made history in 2010 by declaring the highest ever bonus of Rs 3 Bn to the life insurance policy holders of SLIC. This helped increasing the brand credibility significantly.

Apollo was a private hospital originally set up by an Indian company and subsequently sold to Sri Lanka Insurance. By 2009 the hospital was not doing well. When Sri Lanka Insurance ownership reverted to government then Defense secretary Gotabhaya Rajapaksa was appointed Chairman of the struggling hospital. The original idea was to convert the hospital to a military hospital as it was not financially viable to maintain. Hand in hand with Gotabaya Rajapksa, the Chairman of the SLIC-controlled Apollo hospitals, Godahewa, who was the Managing Director of Sri Lanka Insurance took a series of measures to turn around the company which was rebranded as Lanka Hospitals and became an industry bench mark for service excellence in the health care industry. Considering his contribution towards turning around Lanka Hospitals from loss making company to a highly profitable and one of the most sought after private health care services of the country, the Chairman Gotabaya Rajapaksa invited him to remain on the Board even after he left SLIC to become the Chairman of Sri Lanka Tourism. When Fortis health care of Singapore bought a substantial shareholding of Lanka Hospitals in 2011 LHP board made full use of the expertise of Forties to strengthen the medical standards of the hospital The Sunday Leader. The joint collaboration between the Super Religare Laboratories of Fortis Health Care and Lanka Hospitals in setting up an international standard laboratory network in the country was also a strategic decision that helped the hospitals increasing overall profitability.

=== Sri Lanka Tourism ===
As the Chairman of Sri Lanka Tourism Dr Nalaka Godahewa was instrumental in developing the Sri Lanka Tourism Development Strategy 2011-2016 which was approved by the Cabinet of Ministers of Sri Lanka It was under his direction that Sri Lanka Tourism started promoting a clear value proposition of the destination being authentic, compact and diverse under the new tagline 'Refreshingly Sri Lanka, the Wonder of Asia'. He has been commended by key corporate personalities in the country for creating a highly efficient and investor friendly management culture within a government organization and also for his highly strategic and focused approach towards developing tourism in the post war Sri Lanka. In the 2011/12 annual report the Chairman of Aitken Spence Group, Mr Harry Jayewardene, probably one of the most out spoken and highly critical business leader in the country, states "I must commend the one-stop shop now operated by Sri Lanka Tourism for those interested in entering the industry. The new facilitation body is a much needed single point of contact and has clearly eased the processing and coordination complexities faced by investors". Godahewa was invited by UNWTO on several occasions to talk about Sri Lanka Tourism. He also took a special interest in promoting Chinese tourism to Sri Lanka and made a special contribution by bringing to limelight the historical records of the 14th century Chinese Naval Admiral Zheng He who visited Sri Lanka 6 times. In 2012 Godahewa launched a coffee table book named Refreshingly Sri Lanka jointly with the photographer Dilum Alagiyawanna to support the Tourism promotions efforts of the country. However Sri Lanka Tourism Promotions Bureau changed the 'Refreshingly Sri Lanka' tagline immediately following the exit of Godahewa showing sharp differences of opinion within the Ministry. In 2016 UNWTO/PATA included the Sri Lanka Tourism strategy speech presented by Dr Nalaka Godahewa in Guilin China in 2011 in a publication named 'Global Tourism Outlook 2007-2015' which included some of the best country strategy presentations made at UNWTO over the previous 12 years

=== Securities Exchange Commission ===
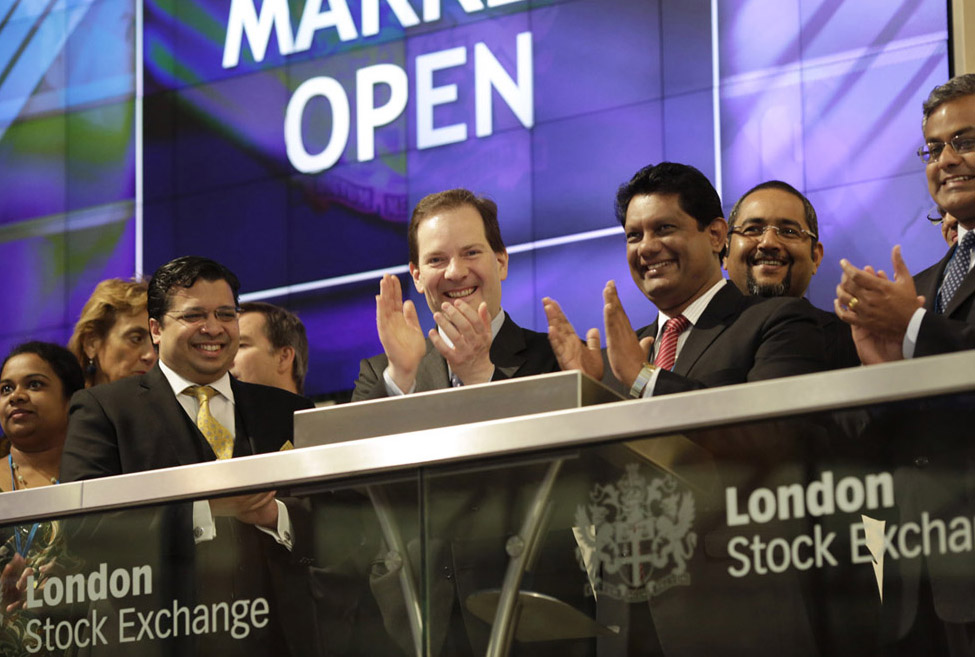
Ceremonially opening the London Stock Exchange with Sri Lanka High Commissioner to UK in 2014

Nalaka Godahewa's appointment to SEC as Chairman took place at a time there were a number of controversies surrounding the Colombo Stock Exchange. During the last 12 months proceeding his appointment on 28 August 2012, two chairpersons of SEC had resigned due to public pressure following continuous decline in the overall market performance. Once rated the Asia's second best performing stock market in Asia the CSE had become Asia's worst performing stock market by mid-2012. The SEC chairmanship became vacant on 17 Aug when Former Chairman of the Securities and Exchange Commission Tilak Karunaratne resigned, claiming he had come under pressure from market players being investigated for alleged stock market. On the other hand, active investors pointed out that during Karunratne's tenure the market performance got from bad to worst due to ad hoc decision making and excessive regulations. Same allegation was there for Karunaratne's predecessor Indrani Sugathadasa, during whose short tenure the market crash actually started. Godahewa on the other hand was seen as a more market friendly regulator respected by both public sector and private sector and the market confidence was visible in the immediate turnaround of the market following his appointment. The new regulator assured that all investigations would continue without interruption but promised a more strategic approach for regulation and market development. Following the introduction of a 10-point action plan for market development, the market bounced back once again All Share Price Index (CSEASI) returned to 6500 mark in June 2013, one year after it hit the bottom. In October 2013 Godahewa presented to the public the first year achievements at SEC which demonstrated that the implementation of the capital market development plan was on track. When capital market vision 2020 was launched in January 2015 with a target of achieving US$100 B the market performance had reached a peak with ASPI at 7500 plus and performing better than all regional and global indices. In January 2015, the Colombo Stock Exchange (CSE) was voted the "Most Sustainable Growth Exchange" in Asia, by the subscribers of the CIF Journal of UK, the World Bank, International Monetary Fund (IMF), Pacific Investment Management Company (PIMCO) and Fidelity Investments.

Since Dr Nalaka Godahewa was appointed to lead SEC, he was instrumental in ushering a period of excellent market performance which was reported in daily FT under the heading Capital raised via Bourse booms to record Rs. 119.4 b which reported that " Amount raised in 2013 was up 300% over 2012 and surpasses even the 2010-09 bull run years and active 2011". It further stated "Most analysts viewed these achievements, along with record raising of debt worth Rs. 68.3 billion and net foreign inflow of Rs. 34.1 billion, as testimony of a major turnaround for the CSE after having been bruised by various allegations in 2011 and 2012.". By the end of 2014 the market capitalization was up 631% since the end of the war and the annual net foreign inflow had exceeded Rs 97 Bn leading to a Daily FT cover story under the title " Capital market gathers momentum" which remarked " This achievement is commendable since there were many who warned that foreigners would shun the Colombo Stock Market after it was faced with allegations of manipulation among other ills".

=== Bogus allegations and verdict ===
Dr Godahewa was investigated in 2015 by FCID, a special police unit set up by the newly elected government, regarding a Board approved Rs 5 million sponsorship given for youth education by the Securities Exchange Commission where he was a former Chairman . However this special police unit itself was found illegal and dissolved 5 years later. According to a presidential commission report tabled in Sri Lanka Parliament in March 2021 during the 2015–2019 period a large number of politically active people had been prosecuted using this illegally set up Financial Crimes Investigation Unit The presidential commission which investigated into mass scale political suppression during 2015-2019 period had unanimously concluded that Dr Godahewa's was a clear case of political victimization Concerns were raised even at the United Nations Human Rights Council (UNHRC) in Geneva, suggesting that certain prominent politicians who held high positions between 2015 and 2019 could potentially face the loss of their civil rights if proven guilty of misusing their authority to target political adversaries. After a 7 yr long trial where many delays were caused by the AGs department struggling to prove anything, on 26 January 2023, the colombo High Court Judge Amal Ranaraja acquitted Dr Godahewa from all charges on the grounds that there was no evidence to find him guilty.

== Political career ==
Godahewa's political journey began in 2015 after he became a leading speaker of the opposition in many public forums Along with a few like-minded professionals, Godahewa pioneered the establishment of the Viyathmaga organization (Professionals for a Better Tomorrow) which functioned as the main think-tank for SLPP presidential candidate Gotabaya Rajapaksa, who won the 2019 election and was elected the 7th Executive President of Sri Lanka.

Godahewa contested the 2020 parliamentary elections as a candidate of Sri Lanka Podujana Peramuna, the party of president Rajapaksa. Godahewa won the most preferential votes from the Gampaha District and was elected to parliament on 5 August 2020. Godahewa won 325,479 votes, the most number of votes won by a candidate contesting in a Sri Lankan parliamentary election for the first time.

Following the mass resignation of the then-current Sri Lankan cabinet in the wake of the 2022 Sri Lankan protests, Godahewa was appointed as the Minister of Mass Media by President Gotabaya Rajapaksa on 18 April 2022. Soon after being appointed to the cabinet, Godahewa tendered his resignation requesting the president to form an all party government, volunteering to give his cabinet position to an opposition member, but his resignation was not accepted by the president .

Godahewa continued as a Cabinet minister for a brief period but left the government and sat in the opposition as he was not in agreement with the government In December 2022, Dr Godahewa formed his own political party, the Freedom People's Front, with 'Helicopter' as its electoral symbol. However when Parliamentary elections were called in October 2024 he opted not to contest the election
