= V. Balakumaran (Tamil activist) =

Sri Lankan Tamil militant leader

- Born: 15 November 1947; Karaveddy, Jaffna District, Sri Lanka
- Died: 17 May 2009 (aged 61)
- Cause of death: disappeared in Sri Lankan Army custody
- Occupations: militant leader, political activist, writer
- Years active: 1975-2009
- Known for: being a leader of EROS and LTTE

V. Balakumaran was a Sri Lankan Tamil political activist and a leading member of Tamil militant groups. He was one of the leaders of the Eelam Revolutionary Organisation of Students (EROS). Balakumaran later joined the Liberation Tigers of Tamil Eelam (LTTE) and was active in its political division.

== Background ==
Balakumaran was born on 15 November 1947 in Karaveddy, Jaffna District of northern Sri Lanka. Balakumaran joined the EROS in the mid-1970s during the growth of Tamil youth militancy, citing "discrimination and oppression" by the Sri Lankan government. After the disarming of Tamil militant groups under the Indo-Sri Lanka Accord in 1987, the EROS leadership decided to disband the group and Balakumaran later joined the LTTE. He served as one of the main political advisors in the LTTE between 1990 and 2009. During the last stages of the Sri Lankan civil war, Balakumaran was injured from government shelling on 26 January 2009; and he and his 18-year-old son, Sooriyatheepan, went missing after surrendering to the Sri Lankan Army on 17 May in Mullaitivu. In 2010, The Island reported that Balakumaran had been killed by the Army in early 2009.
