= Arul Pragasam =

Sri Lankan Tamil revolutionary (1948–2019)

Arulpragasam
- Born: Arular Richard Arulpragasam; 13 April 1948; Jaffna, Ceylon
- Died: 3 December 2019 (aged 71); Jaffna, Sri Lanka
- Occupations: Tamil Eelam independence activist, fighter and engineer
- Spouse: Kala Arulpragasam
- Children: 3, including Kali and Mathangi

Arulappu Richard Arulpragasam (Tamil: அருளப்பு ரிசர்ட் அருள்பிரகாஶம்) (13 April 1948 – 3 December 2019), also known as Arular and A. R. Arulpragasam, was a Sri Lankan Tamil intellectual, activist and former revolutionary from Jaffna who had a part in forming the group Eelam Revolutionary Organisation of Students (EROS) in January 1975 in Wandsworth, England during the Tamil independence movements to secure an independent Tamil Eelam. He later left the conflict, after work as an independent peace negotiator between the two sides of the civil war. At the time of his death, he headed the Global Sustainability Initiative in the United Kingdom. He was also the father of the musician M.I.A, Kali Arulpragasam and Sugu Aru.

== Education ==
Arulpragasam graduated from the Peoples' Friendship University of Russia in Moscow with a degree in Engineering.

== Political career ==
Having created EROS in 1975 in Wandsworth, England the group staged demonstrations at the inaugural Cricket World Cup that year, prompting clashes between Tamil and Sinhalese cricket supporters, and bringing the conflict in Sri Lanka to international attention for the first time. In March 1976, he moved to Vavuniya and was one of three EROS members selected to train for six months in Lebanon with Palestinian militants associated with the Fatah wing of the PLO. He left after three months of training, returning to Jaffna, Northern Sri Lanka with his family. Arulpragasam moved back to Vavuniya in late 1976 and from 1978 – 1986, he lived and worked in Tamil Nadu where India, through its intelligence agency supported and trained EROS, one of six Tamil revolutionary groups against the Sri Lankan state. He made sporadic visits to Jaffna where his family lived, introducing himself to his children as their uncle. Although never himself a member of the LTTE, Arulpragasam was an old friend of the group's military leader Vellupillai Prabhakaran during the early years of the Tamil rebellion. His wife and three children left Jaffna in the late 80s and were granted political asylum in the United Kingdom, while he remained behind. Arul Pragasam left his group EROS and the conflict in 1987, becoming an independent peace mediator between the two sides of the civil war, and he was instrumental in bringing in more direct Indian intervention to the conflict in 1987, ultimately ending in failure.

M.I.A. has stated in interviews her father shared revolutionary ideals, and that he was a politician, although she had no contact with him since the early 1990s. Rarely speaking about her father publicly, in an interview with The Guardian in 2005, M.I.A. stated "He never had a practical, physical influence" in her family's life. On his involvement in the war and some writers referring to him as a former Tiger rebel, she has said "People write it because it's easy. The Tigers were big in numbers but my dad was too selective. The Tigers had machetes and said, 'They killed my mum so I'm going to fucking fight them.' And my dad was like, 'No no no no, read this amazing book about revolution. Let's sit down and draw up a manifesto."

== Later years ==
In 1997, he set up an Institute of Sustainability Development at Trincomalee on the Eastern Province's coast. The same year, he wrote a seminal book on Tamil history, and was based in the island's north east and Tamil Nadu until the mid-2000s. He contacted his daughter following the release of her debut album, named Arular after him, in 2005, telling her to change its name, however she refused. His house was flooded after the 2004 Indian Ocean earthquake and tsunami. Arulpragasam moved to Britain and, at the time of his death, headed the Britain-based Global Sustainability Initiative, which has overseen inventions such as a redesigned bullock cart, a motorised wheelbarrow and a car that consumes less petrol. Arulpragasam explained "GSI's mission is to develop a program with a global perspective." Pragasam died on 3 December 2019, aged 71.

== Personal life ==
Arul Pragasam was the father of jewellery designer Kali Arulpragasam, musician/filmmaker/visual artist Mathangi "Maya" Arulpragasam (better known by her stage name, M.I.A.), and Sugu Arulpragasam. His family moved back to Sri Lanka when Maya was six months old. M.I.A. named her 2005 debut album Arular after her father, partly for him to get in contact with her. "Arular" was his nom de guerre during the civil war. M.I.A. said of her upbringing: "I only had my mum. I never grew up with my dad so I don’t know what he’s like. I think I’m a mixture of both. My mum’s really passive, quiet and she’s not feisty. She cared about bringing in food and getting us to school and stuff but that’s as far as it went. Growing up without a dad, I was going to school and turning up at parents' meetings on my own. At the time everyone was like, "Oh if you had a dad he’d pay for your school and you’d have a better future". At the time, my mom was bringing us up and she was like, "The only thing your father gave you was a name". So that's why I used [his name "Arular"] on my album to turn it into a statement that my mom always made. If the only thing he's going to give me is a name, then that's what I'm going to use." In 2005, M.I.A. told EGO Magazine that despite her father's involvement in the conflict, she felt no affiliation to either armed party in the war, noting her work to be the voice of "civilians and refugees that get caught up in the cross fire of politics" and shocking enough to invoke discussion in young people that felt they had no right to talk. Following the end of the armed conflict in 2009, M.I.A. condemned the Government of Sri Lanka for engaging in systematic genocide against Tamils. In a 2010 feature for The Fader, she stated of the US and Sri Lankan government's behaviour towards her following her rise in prominence: "He negotiated peace processes, brought in the new army, and when he goes to Sri Lanka, it’s the government who gives him security against the Tigers", she explains. "They used it the other way and told the world my dad’s a Tiger which got me to this point. It’s like, 'Wow I didn’t know this guy, and this guy has been working for you for 20 fucking years, and when you feel like it you want to use my own dad against me to discredit what I do.'"
