= Eelam People's Democratic Party =

Eelam People's Democratic Party ஈழ மக்கள் ஜனநாயகக் கட்சி ඊළාම් ජනතා ප්‍රජාතන්ත්‍රවාදී පක්ෂය
- Abbreviation: EPDP
- Secretary: Douglas Devananda
- Founder: Douglas Devananda
- Founded: November 1987 (38 years ago)
- Split from: Eelam People's Revolutionary Liberation Front
- Headquarters: 121 Park Road, Colombo 05
- National affiliation: New Democratic Front; Former: Sri Lanka People's Freedom Alliance; Democratic Tamil National Front
- Parliament of Sri Lanka: 0 / 225
- Sri Lankan Provincial Councils: 0 / 455
- Local Government: 35 / 7,842

Election symbol
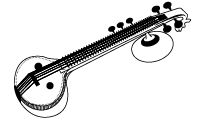
- Veena

Party flag

Website
- epdpnews.com

The Eelam People's Democratic Party (EPDP) is a Sri Lankan political party and a pro-government paramilitary organization. It is led by its founder Douglas Devananda.

== Background ==
Douglas Devananda was one of the founding members of the Eelam Revolutionary Organisation of Students (EROS), one of the earliest Sri Lankan Tamil militant groups. In 1980, EROS split into two as K. Pathmanabha (Padmanaba) Varatharajah Perumal broke away and formed the Eelam People's Revolutionary Liberation Front (EPRLF). Devananda joined the EPRLF. By early 1986, disputes had arisen between Devananda and Pathmanabha, the EPRLF's political leader. The EPRLF leadership split into two factions: EPRLF (Ranjan) and EPRLF (Douglas). In 1987, the EPRLF (Douglas) faction formally split from the EPRLF. Devananda initially formed the Eelam National Democratic Liberation Front (ENDLF) with a breakaway faction of the People's Liberation Organisation of Tamil Eelam led by Paranthan Rajan. The ENDLF collapsed when Rajan started working with Indians - Devananda was opposed to the Indian intervention in the Sri Lankan Civil War. Devananda, now living in Madras, India, then formed the Eelam People's Democratic Party.

=== Kidnapping and extortion ===
The EPDP lacked funds and Devananda resorted to kidnapping and extortion of Sri Lankan Tamils living in Madras. In 1989, Devananda and 25 others were arrested for the second time by the Indian police, this time for kidnapping a ten-year-old boy for ransom at Poonamallee High Road, Kilpauk, Madras, and imprisoned. He was given bail. In 1990, police in Kodambakkam, Madras, started an investigation on Devananda on charges of rioting and criminal intimidation of a person called Valavan. In 1990, Devananda jumped bail and returned to Sri Lanka. A secret US government cable written by Ambassador Robert O. Blake Jr. states that "President Rajapaksa's government, strapped for cash, has cut direct payments to paramilitaries initiated by former President Kumaratunga and instead turns a blind eye to extortion and kidnapping for ransom by EPDP and Karuna".

=== Prostitution ===
A secret US government cable written by ambassador Robert O. Blake Jr. states “The children are sold into slavery, usually boys to work camps and girls to prostitution rings, through EPDP's networks in India and Malaysia. Sunthararaj maintains that children are often smuggled out of the country with the help of a corrupt Customs and Immigration official at Bandaranaike International Airport in Colombo.” Stephan Sunthararaj's allegations about child prostitution were verified by one Government Agent Ganesh. Stephan Sunthararaj has since been kidnapped and has disappeared.

== Paramilitary group ==
In 1990, Devananda arrived in Colombo. A meeting was arranged by Sri Lankan intelligence between Devananda and Deputy Defence Minister Ranjan Wijeratne. Devananda offered to place the EPDP under Sri Lankan government control in return for support and protection from the Tamil Tigers. The government accepted - the EPDP had transformed itself into a paramilitary organisation. Devananda was attacked for betraying the Tamil people and collaborating with the enemy.

EPDP cadres from all over Sri Lanka and India converged on Colombo. The government gave the EPDP vast financial assistance. The EPDP, with the support of the government, took control of the islands off Jaffna Peninsula after the Tigers withdrew. The EPDP used the islands as a base to transport goods, particularly dried fish, between India and Sri Lanka. It also imposed taxes. Tamils living in Colombo were extorted for money.

On 1 January 1993, Tharmalingam Selvakumar, a former EPDP sympathiser, was abducted from the Premil Sports Club at Kotahena, Colombo. Selvakumar has alleged that he was taken in a van driven by Devananda to Devananda's house at 121 Park Road, Colombo 5. He was detained along with other prisoners in cells at the back of Devananda's house. Selvakumar was tortured and the EPDP tried to extort money from his family.

All of this resulted in Devananda making a fortune.

The EPDP's paramilitary wing continues to operate, despite its claims to have given up violence. The paramilitary wing has been accused of helping the Sri Lankan Navy commit massacres in places like Allaipiddy.

== Political party ==
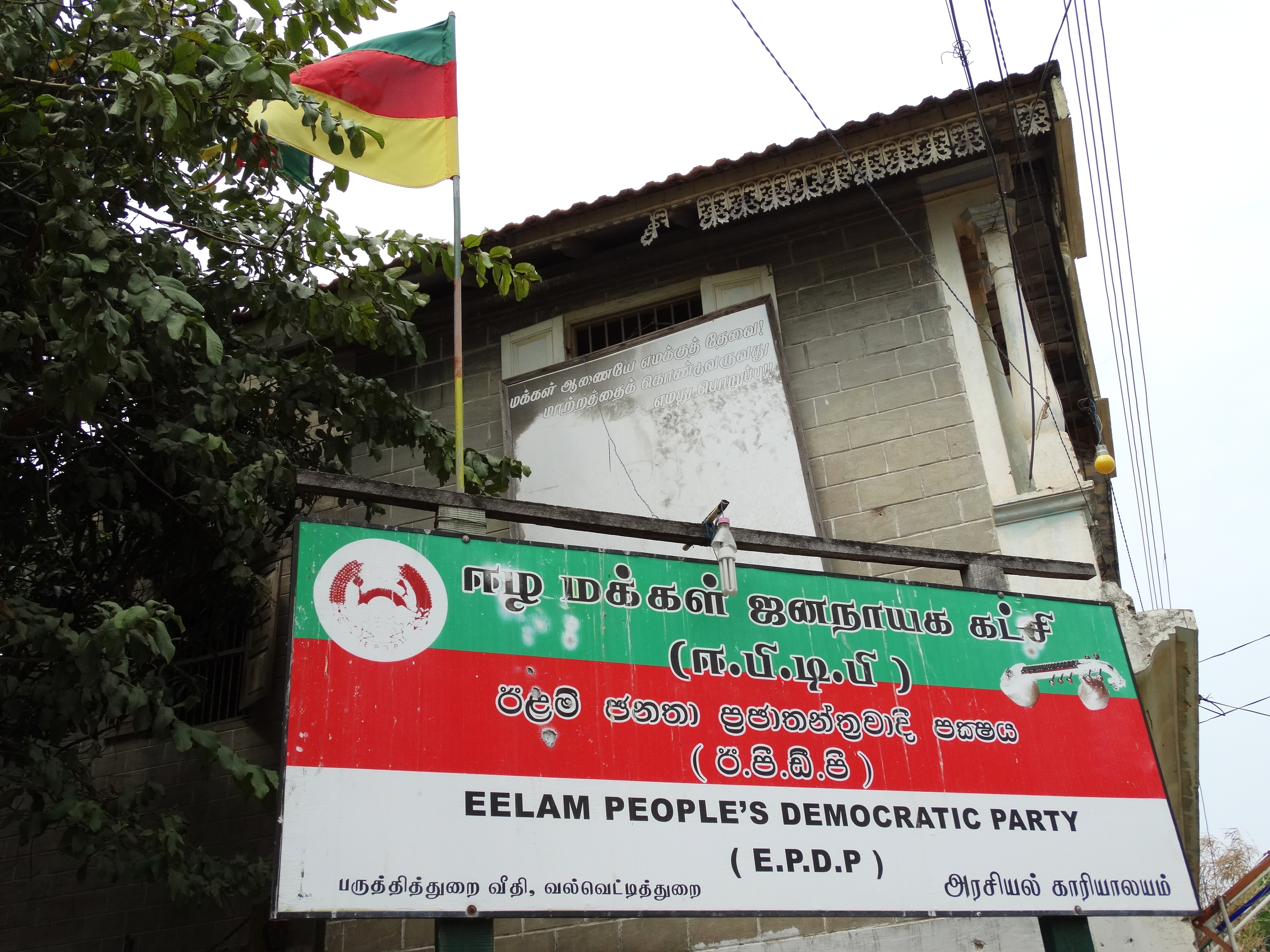
EPDP regional headquarters, Valvettithurai, in 2014

Devananda and the EPDP entered electoral politics when it contested the 1994 parliamentary election as an independent group in Jaffna District. Most of the district was under Tamil Tiger control and so did not vote, allowing the EPDP win nine parliamentary seats with just 10,744 votes (0.14%), of which 9,944 votes came from the EPDP controlled Jaffna islands. The EPDP became an ally of President Chandrika Kumaratunga and her People's Alliance (PA) government.

At the 2000 parliamentary election, the EPDP won 50,890 votes (0.59%), securing four of the 225 seats in Parliament. In October 2000 Kumaratunga appointed Devananda as Minister of Development, Rehabilitation and Reconstruction of the North, and Tamil Affairs, North and East.

At the 2001 parliamentary election, the EPDP won 72,783 votes (0.81%), securing two of the 225 seats in Parliament. Devananda lost his ministerial post following the change of government.

At the 2004 parliamentary election, the EPDP won 24,955 votes (0.27%), securing one of the 225 seats in Parliament. Devananda was appointed as Minister of Agriculture, Marketing Development, Hindu Education Affairs, Tamil Language & Vocational Training Centres in North when the United People's Freedom Alliance, the successor to the PA, returned to power. He was appointed Minister for Social Service and Social Welfare by President Mahinda Rajapaksa in 2005. There are unproved allegations of corruption against Devananda.

=== United People's Freedom Alliance ===
Since the end of the Sri Lankan Civil War in May 2009, the EPDP has contested local and national elections under the UPFA banner rather than on its own. At the 2010 parliamentary election, three EPDP members were elected on the UPFA ticket, all from Jaffna District.

== Electoral history ==
=== Parliamentary ===
Election year	Votes	Vote %	Seats won	+/–	Government
1994	10,744	0.14%	9 / 225	▲9	Government
2000	50,890	0.59%	4 / 225	▼5	Government
2001	72,783	0.81%	2 / 225	▼2	Opposition
2004	24,955	0.27%	1 / 225	▼1	Government
2010	Part of UPFA		3 / 225	▲2	Government
2015	33,481	0.30%	1 / 225	▼2	Opposition
2020	61,464	0.53%	2 / 225	▲1	Government
2024	28,985	0.26%	0 / 225	▼2	Extra-parliamentary

=== Local ===
Election year	Votes	Vote %	Councillors	Local Authorities
1998	38,726	42.28%	105 / 233	9 / 17
2009	Part of UPFA		9 / 34	1 / 2
2018	74,128	0.60%	98 / 8,327	1 / 340
2025	21,656	0.21%	35 / 7,812	1 / 341
