= Eelam Revolutionary Organisation of Students =

Eelam Revolutionary Organisation of Students ஈழ புரட்சிகர மாணவர் இயக்கம்
- Leader: Nesan Shankar Raji
- Secretary: Rajanathan Prabaharan
- Founder: Eliyathamby Ratnasabapathy; V. Balakumaran; Shankar Rajee
- Founded: 1975
- Headquarters: Jaffna
- Ideology: Tamil nationalism

Election symbol
- Plough

The Eelam Revolutionary Organisation of Students (EROS), also known as the Eelam Revolutionary Organisers, was a former Tamil militant group in Sri Lanka. Most of the EROS membership was absorbed into the Liberation Tigers of Tamil Eelam (LTTE) in 1990. The other half of EROS that did not join forces with the LTTE due was led by PLO trained Shankar Rajee, Senior politburo member and military commander of EROS from 1990 until his demise in 2005. The political wing of 'EROS' is known as the Eelavar Democratic Front.

== Origins ==
The EROS was formed in London in 1975 by Arul Pragasam, Eliyathamby Ratnasabapathy, V. Balakumaran, Nesadurai Thirunesan (aka Shankar Rajee) and Balanadarajah Iyer (aka Sinna Bala). It started as a think-tank, strongly influenced by Marxism, to analyse Tamil issues. Much of its early membership was drawn from the eastern districts of Batticaloa and Amparai, and also the Jaffna Peninsula. EROS was the first political group which recruited Sri Lankan Muslims as well and was more concerned with the question of the Sri Lankan Muslims than any other group had been. They drew up a four phase programme to co-opt the Tamil-speaking Muslims of the eastern province into the Eelam struggle, by working closely with them, and understanding and espousing their grievances.

== Links with Palestinians ==
In 1976, the EROS established links with the Abu Jihad of the Palestine Liberation Organization (PLO) and began planning the setting up of camps to train Sri Lankan Tamils in military and guerrilla warfare. EROS even opened up their training camp for the LTTE where Velupillai Prabhakaran had his initial training. The Tamil Eelam Liberation Organization (TELO), Eelam People's Revolutionary Liberation Front (EPRLF) and People's Liberation Organisation of Tamil Eelam (PLOTE) sent their own men to the PLO's camps for training under the request of EROS, and EROS also organised for men of other groups to be sent. A number of Tamils, including many who would later form the core of the other Tamil militant groups, started their militant careers in these camps.

== Splinter groups ==
Despite being the most ideological of all the Tamil groups, and its strong revolutionary nationalism, the EROS never became as militarily active as later groups such as the LTTE or TELO, largely because its leadership continued to be based in London. Their most notable military actions was the bombings in Sri Lanka in 1984 and 1985, and the kidnapping of British journalist Penelope Willis.

Partly as a result of this, differences arose in 1979 among the cadre in Sri Lanka. The result was that the student wing of the EROS, the General Union of Eelam Students, split away from the EROS in 1980 to form a new organisation, the Eelam People's Revolutionary Liberation Front. EROS was also one of the main forces behind the attempt to form a united front, the Eelam National Liberation Front, in 1984, and remained the major driving force behind the front until it fell apart in 1986.

== Politics ==
EROS contested the 1989 parliamentary election as an independent group in four electoral districts in the north-east of Sri Lanka. EROS won 229,877 votes (4.11%), securing 13 of the 225 seats in Parliament. Amongst the elected EROS MPs were Eliyathamby Ratnasabapathy and Eliyathamby Pararasasingam.

== LTTE association ==
During the IPKF period, EROS was one of the few groups to support the LTTE and was in fact their main political advisory body as the EROS and LTTE worked in alliance with one another. In the late 1980s, differences arose amongst the EROS leadership over the question of whether or not they should militarily support the LTTE. In 1990, the group was effectively disbanded. One of its two top leaders, V. Balakumaran, together with a large portion of its members, left EROS to join the LTTE, saying it was a betrayal of the Tamil cause not to take up arms.

The remnants of the group, led by Shankar Rajee, remained in Colombo and continued to call themselves EROS. They have transformed themselves into pro-government, anti-LTTE paramilitary group and a political party. Following the death of Shankar Rajee in 2005, his son Nesan Thirunesan took over as its new youth leader.

== EROS in popular culture ==
Artist Mathangi "Maya" Arulpragasam, better known as M.I.A., is the daughter of Arul Pragasam, a founding member of EROS. In her music, M.I.A. makes frequent references to the Sri Lankan Civil War and her father's participation in EROS.

== See also ==
- List of Sri Lankan Tamil militant groups#Student organizations
