= Lists of death tolls =

"Organized by death toll" means

- list entries are ordered by death toll, or
- there is a table sortable on a column labeled "Death toll", "Casualties", or equivalent

== General ==
- List of accidents and disasters by death toll
- List of famines, not included in natural disasters as some of them are at least partially anthropogenic

== Accidents ==
- List of aircraft accidents and incidents by number of ground fatalities
- List of deadliest aircraft accidents and incidents
- List of airship accidents
- List of ballooning accidents
- List of elevator accidents
- List of nuclear and radiation accidents by death toll
- List of rail accidents in the United Kingdom
- List of the deadliest firefighter disasters in the United States
- List of traffic accidents by death toll in the United States

== Natural disasters including diseases ==
- List of costly or deadly hailstorms
- List of the deadliest tropical cyclones
- List of Pacific hurricane records
- List of epidemics and pandemics
- List of natural disasters by death toll
- List of avalanches by death toll
- List of deadliest floods
- List of foodborne illness outbreaks by death toll
- List of volcanic eruptions by death toll
- List of Tornadoes by death toll

== Intentional killing, including collateral deaths ==
- American units with the highest percentage of casualties per conflict
- Deadliest single days of World War I
- List of battles by casualties
- List of battles with most United States military fatalities
- List of genocides
- List of major terrorist incidents
- Lists of mass shootings in the United States
- List of modern conflicts in the Middle East
- List of murderers by number of victims
- List of ongoing armed conflicts
- List of rampage killers
- List of serial killers before 1900
- List of serial killers by number of victims
- List of ships sunk by submarines by death toll
- List of terrorist incidents
- List of wars by death toll
- List of mass stabbings by death toll

=== Massacres ===
- List of massacres at sea
- List of massacres in the Italian Social Republic
- List of massacres in Jerusalem
- List of massacres in Nagaland
- List of massacres of Kurdish people
- List of massacres of Nizari Ismailis
- List of massacres of Turkish people

==== By war ====
- List of massacres during the Algerian Civil War
- List of massacres during the Bosnian War
- List of massacres during the Croatian War of Independence
- List of massacres during the Eritrean War of Independence
- List of massacres during the Finnish Civil War
- Killings and massacres during the 1948 Palestine war
- List of massacres during the Syrian civil war
- List of mass executions and massacres in Yugoslavia during World War II

=== School-related shootings and attacks ===
- List of attacks related to primary schools, includes kindergarten attacks
- List of attacks related to secondary schools (before 2000)
- List of attacks related to secondary schools (2010s)
- List of attacks related to secondary schools (2020s)
- List of attacks related to post-secondary schools
- List of unsuccessful attacks related to schools
- List of school massacres by death toll
- Lists of school shootings in the United States
  - List of school shootings in the United States (before 2000)
  - List of school shootings in the United States (2000s)
  - List of school shootings in the United States (2010s)
  - List of school shootings in the United States (2020s)
  - List of school shootings in the United States by death toll

== Disasters by place ==
- List of disasters in Antarctica by death toll
- List of disasters in Metro Manila by death toll
- List of disasters in New York City by death toll

=== Country ===
- List of disasters in Australia by death toll
- List of disasters in Bangladesh by death toll
- List of disasters in Canada by death toll
- List of disasters in Croatia by death toll
- List of disasters in Estonia by death toll
- List of disasters in Great Britain and Ireland by death toll
- List of disasters in Japan by death toll
- List of disasters in Malta by death toll
- List of disasters in New Zealand by death toll
- List of disasters in Poland by death toll
- List of disasters in Romania by death toll
- List of disasters in Sweden by death toll
- List of disasters in the United States by death toll
