= General Pershing WWI casualty list =

US military-produced casualty list

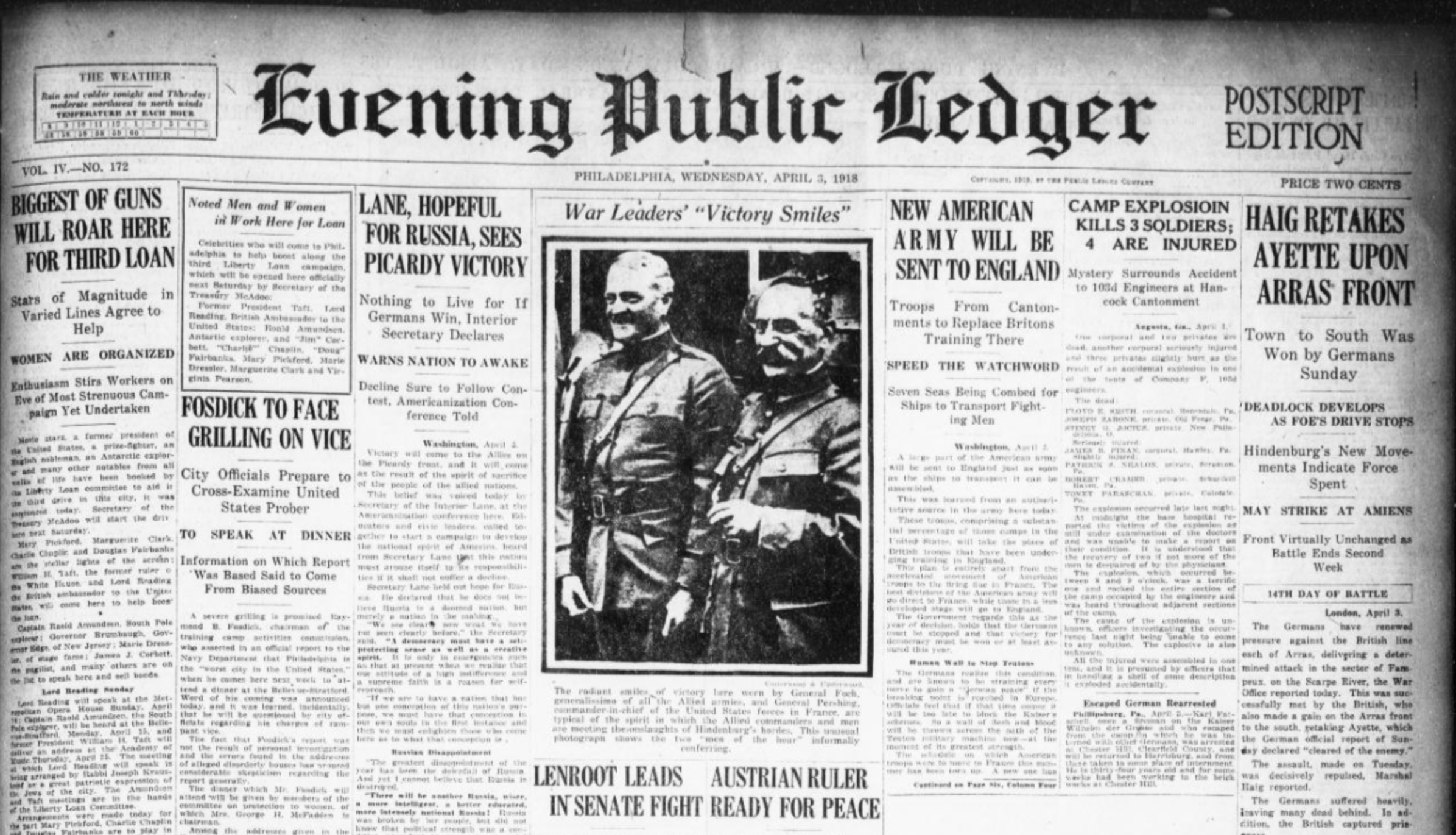
Front page of the Evening Public Ledger, April 3, 1918, with General John Pershing

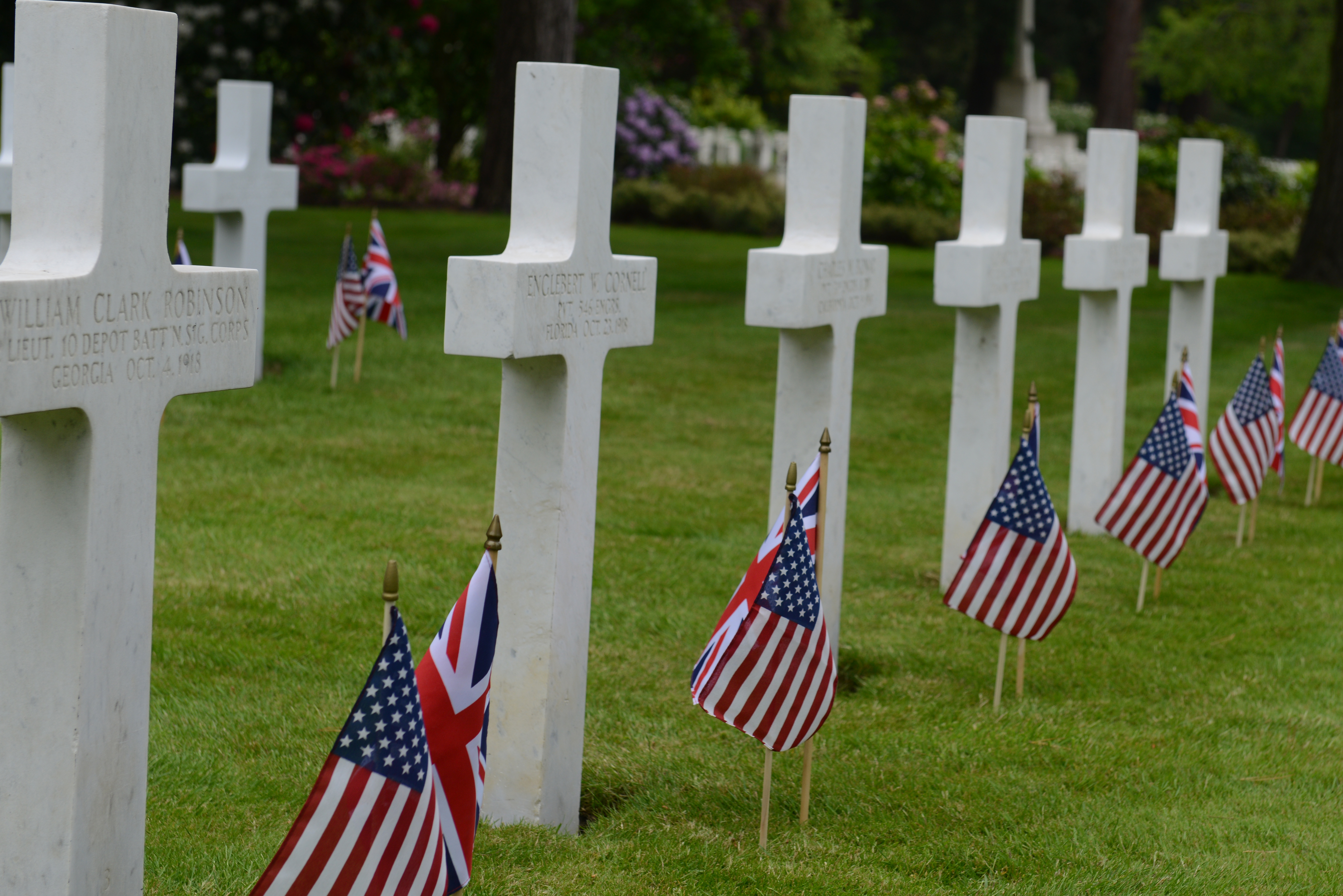
Rows of headstones line the grounds of Brookwood American Cemetery and Memorial, United Kingdom

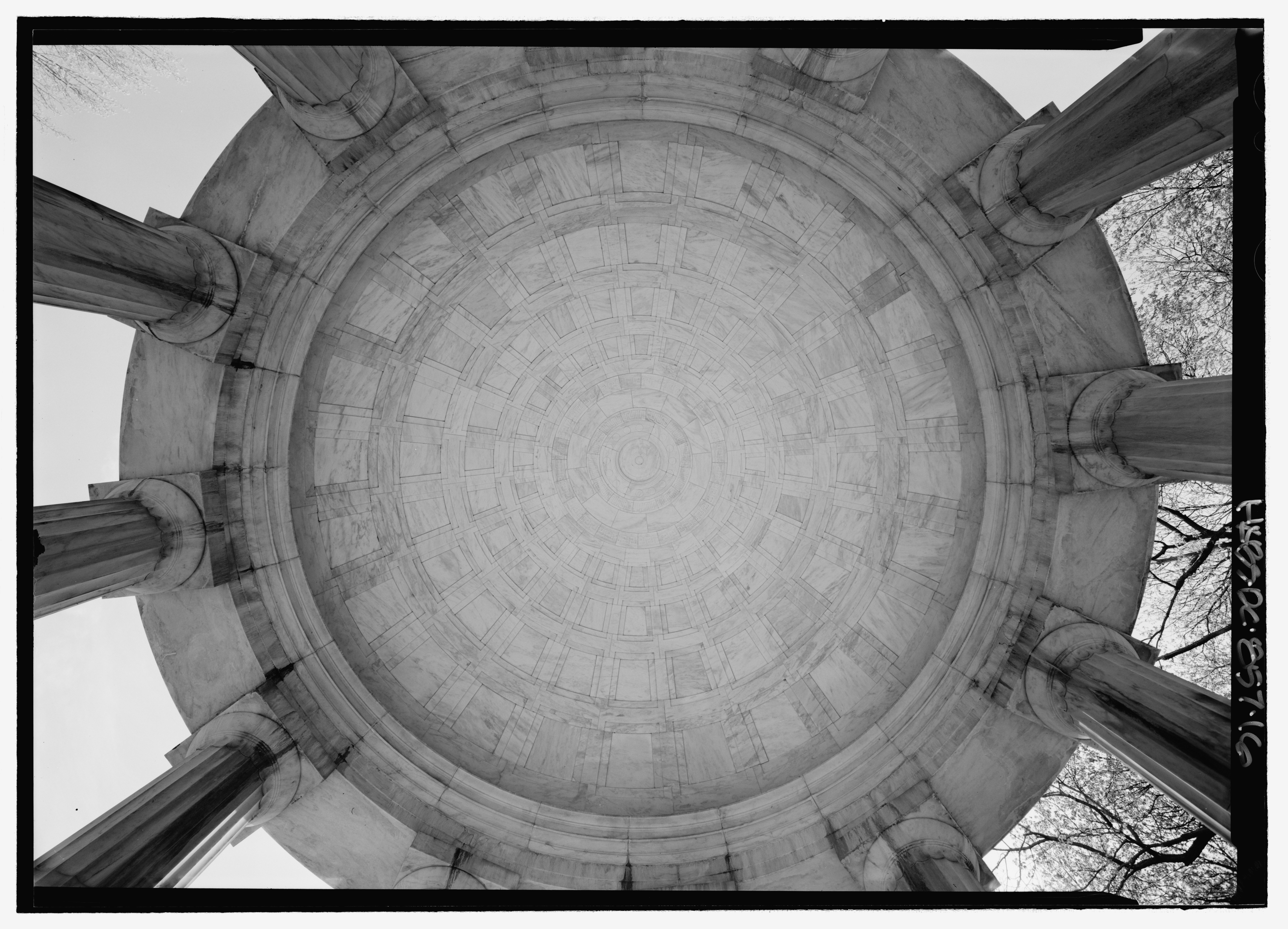
District of Columbia War Memorial, West Potomac Park, Washington, DC

The General Pershing WWI casualty list was a list of casualties released to the media by the American military during World War I. Newspapers like the Evening Public Ledger (EPL) would title the list's summary, General Pershing Reports or Pershing Reports. The name General Pershing refers to General John Pershing, who was in command of the American Expeditionary Forces (AEF), the expeditionary force of the United States during World War I. While fighting the Germans on the Western Front the AEF would take daily casualties in the form of those killed in action (KIA), those who died from their wounds, those who died from disease, accidental deaths, soldiers missing in action (MIA) and soldiers wounded in action (WIA). These numbers would be tabulated by the American military and then released to the American news media.

After the war, the real numbers were mined from the military bureaucracy as opposed to the fog of war. During World War I, 4,734,991 served in the American military. There were a total of 116,516 deaths, with 53,402 of those occurring in battle. Another 63,114 died of noncombat reasons, including about 45,000 due to the 1918 outbreak of Spanish flu; 30,000 soldiers died before they even reached France. Of those that survived the war, 204,002 were wounded in some way.

== The list ==
One of the publications that printed this data along with the names who were reported dead and wounded was the Evening Public Ledger, a Philadelphia newspaper published from March 25, 1836, to January 1942. On November 5, 1917, the EPL published a story with the headline "Casualty List In First Action Thrills Nation". In the article it listed the first three American deaths in the war: McLean County, Kentucky's Corporal James Bethel Gresham, Private Merle Hay from Glidden, Iowa, and Private Thomas Enright of Pittsburgh, Pennsylvania. They had been killed in a skirmish on November 3, 1917. In addition to the three Americans KIA the casualty list printed that five were WIA and twelve soldiers were MIA. Initially, the casualty lists were published with casualty's name and their address. From March 9, 1918, the list was "denatured" or stripped of home addresses. On April 2, 1918, the American War Department said that the only source for casualty lists would be the American command headquarters in France (Pershing's AEF).

== April 1919 ==
Date	Total dead	Total KIA	Total dead from wounds	Total dead from disease	Total dead from accidents	Total MIA	Total WIA	Total casualties	References
April 30, 1919	73,449	32,535	13,467	22,880	4,567	4,133	198,790	276,372	
April 29, 1919									
April 28, 1919									
April 27, 1919									Sunday
April 26, 1919									
April 25, 1919									
April 24, 1919	73053	32442	13453	22771	4387	4433	198426	275942	
April 23, 1919									
April 22, 1919									
April 21, 1919									
April 20, 1919									Sunday
April 19, 1919									
April 18, 1919									
April 17, 1919	72723	32384	13435	22656	4248	4248	197574	274860	
April 16, 1919									
April 15, 1919		9	5	68	41	15	497	635	
April 14, 1919									
April 13, 1919									Sunday
April 12, 1919									
April 11, 1919	72395	32302	13430	22556	4107	4908	196280	273592	
April 10, 1919	72303	32292	13420	22505	4086	4900	195902	273105	
April 9, 1919									
April 8, 1919									
April 7, 1919									
April 6, 1919									Sunday
April 5, 1919									
April 4, 1919									
April 3, 1919	71896	32178	13412	22326	3980	5019	194362	271277	
April 2, 1919									
April 1, 1919									

== March 1919 ==
Date	Total dead	Total KIA	Total dead from wounds	Total dead from disease	Total dead from accidents	Total MIA	Total WIA	Total casualties	References
March 31, 1919									
March 30, 1919									Sunday
March 29, 1919	71145	31977	13386	22038	3744	5421	194184	270750	
March 28, 1919	71105	31968	13375	22018	3744	5417	194155	270677	
March 27, 1919	71018	31960	13368	21962	3728	5416	194052	270486	
March 26, 1919	70928	31952	13363	21920	3693	5412	193905	270245	
March 25, 1919	70865	31948	13356	21882	3679	5407	193887	270159	
March 24, 1919	70812	31945	13353	31840	3674	5407	198708	269927	
March 23, 1919									Sunday
March 22, 1919	70422	31867	13339	21733	3483	5728	193450	269600	
March 21, 1919									
March 20, 1919	70051	31856	13332	21454	3409	5714	192640	268405	
March 19, 1919	69876	31849	13325	21350	3352	5712	192373	267961	
March 18, 1919	69705	31843	13322	21240	3300	5712	191969	267386	
March 17, 1919	69587	31837	13315	21168	3267	5708	191811	267106	
March 16, 1919									Sunday
March 15, 1919	69543	31828	13327	21164	3224	6096	191611	267250	
March 14, 1919	69434	31821	13320	21079	3214	6094	191422	266950	
March 13, 1919	69259	31807	13299	20966	3187	6093	191411	266763	
March 12, 1919	69057	31795	13286	20822	3154	6091	191211	266359	
March 11, 1919	68953	31776	13286	20751	3140	6088	191072	266117	
March 10, 1919									
March 9, 1919									Sunday
March 8, 1919	68608	31745	13241	20535	3087	6348	191126	266082	
March 7, 1919	68533	31733	13231	20482	3087	6348	190868	265749	
March 6, 1919	68404	31729	13222	20387	3066	6343	190756	265503	
March 5, 1919	68268	31721	13212	20275	3060	6341	190308	264917	
March 4, 1919	68209	31707	13212	20242	3048	6341	190027	264577	
March 3, 1919	68104	31707	13198	20181	3018	6937	189702	264173	
March 2, 1919									Sunday
March 1, 1919	68049	31653	13214	20173	3009	6933	199231	274213	

== February 1919 ==
Date	Total dead	Total KIA	Total dead from wounds	Total dead from disease	Total dead from accidents	Total MIA	Total WIA	Total casualties	References
February 28, 1919	67918	31634	13200	20079	3005	6933	198299	273150	
February 27, 1919	67764	31605	13188	19981	2990	6933	197711	272408	
February 26, 1919	67679	31602	13180	19918	2979	6932	194788	269399	
February 25, 1919	67615	31596	13167	19887	2965	6932	192375	266922	
February 24, 1919	67576	31586	13160	19872	2958	6928	190619	265123	
February 23, 1919									Sunday
February 22, 1919	67115	31462	13141	19625	2887	7808	186971	261894	
February 21, 1919	67061	31445	13124	19605	2887	7796	185030	259887	
February 20, 1919	66992	31432	13104	19579	2877	7789	182306	257087	
February 19, 1919	66844	31397	13081	19513	2853	7787	180196	254827	
February 18, 1919	66816	31395	13072	19502	2847	7787	177790	252393	
February 17, 1919	66753	31386	13062	19467	2838	7787	175244	249784	
February 16, 1919									Sunday
February 15, 1919	66492	31314	13036	19353	2789	11208	166865	244570	
February 14, 1919	66357	31283	13036	19249	2789	11205	166683	244245	
February 13, 1919									
February 12, 1919	66176	31237	13013	19153	2773	11200	164077	241453	
February 11, 1919	66103	31222	12998	19114	2769	11190	162292	239585	
February 10, 1919	66082	31217	12993	19104	2768	11189	160696	238240	
February 9, 1919									Sunday
February 8, 1919	65964	31149	13020	19040	2755	11802	159697	237463	
February 7, 1919	65842	31103	13000	18995	2744	11802	158139	235783	
February 6, 1919	65746	31078	12983	18946	2739	11787	157206	234739	
February 5, 1919	65635	31046	12956	18906	2727	11766	154880	232281	
February 4, 1919	65597	31033	12948	18892	2724	11750	152884	230231	
February 3, 1919	65548	31018	12939	18872	2719	11716	151289	228583	
February 2, 1919									Sunday
February 1, 1919	64936	30842	12844	18636	2614	12805	143495	221236	

== January 1919 ==
Date	Total dead	Total KIA	Total dead from wounds	Total dead from disease	Total dead from accidents	Total MIA	Total WIA	Total casualties	References
January 31, 1919	64904	30816	12839	18636	2613	12802	143370	221076	
January 30, 1919	64796	30784	12815	18594	2603	12769	142270	219835	
January 29, 1919	64655	30751	12785	18524	2595	12727	138510	217494	
January 28, 1919	64655	30751	12785	18524	2595	137780	12727	215162	
January 27, 1919	64614	30737	12785	18497	2595	12727	137482	215338	
January 26, 1919									Sunday
January 25, 1919	63982	30459	12637	18314	2572	13436	134362	211873	
January 24, 1919		30459			2572			211852	
January 23, 1919	63865	30426	12609	18268	2562	13387	134258	211782	
January 22, 1919	63806	30429	12609	18209	2559	13387	134153	211737	
January 21, 1919	63796	30426	12609	18202	2559	13387	134036	211282	
January 20, 1919	63723	30399	12596	18176	2552	13377	134036	211137	
January 19, 1919									Sunday
January 18, 1919	76598	29592	12741	18627	15638	21021	131585	228104	
January 17, 1919	76335	29514	12712	18479	15630	20012	131246	227593	
January 16, 1919	76069	29462	12612	18380	15615	19999	130958	227026	
January 15, 1919	75775	29419	12534	18223	15599	19990	130518	226283	
January 14, 1919	75458	29375	12392	18102	15589	19970	130228	226156	
January 13, 1919	75320	29364	12341	18031	15584	19969	130153	225442	
January 12, 1919									Sunday
January 11, 1919	75020	29247	12280	17932	15561	19887	129435	224342	
January 10, 1919	74746	29188	12178	17831	15549	19881	129360	223987	
January 9, 1919	74325	28971	12090	17733	15531	19828	129051	223214	
January 8, 1919	73955	28882	11987	17565	15521	19779	128723	222457	
January 7, 1919	73912	28870	11977	17549	15516	19775	128443	222120	
January 6, 1919	73748	28840	11939	17459	15510	19729	128123	221600	
January 5, 1919									Sunday
January 4, 1919	73275	28717	11753	17311	15494	19626	126536	219437	
January 3, 1919	72875	28602	11633	17160	15480	19514	125103	217492	
January 2, 1919	72744	28577	11561	17131	15475	19469	124276	216489	
January 1, 1919	72398	28475	11455	17002	15466	19339	123896	215633	

== December 1918 ==
Date	Total dead	Total KIA	Total dead from wounds	Total dead from disease	Total dead from accidents	Total MIA	Total WIA	Total casualties	References
December 31, 1918	72398	28475	11455	17002	15466	19339	123677	215414	
December 30, 1918	72264	28433	11413	16955	15463	19150	123295	214709	
December 29, 1918									Sunday
December 28, 1918	72020	28356	11352	16864	15448	19087	122298	213405	
December 27, 1918	71730	28266	11263	16785	15416	18912	121843	212485	
December 26, 1918	70927	28008	11085	16445	15389	18591	120710	210228	
December 25, 1918									Christmas
December 24, 1918	70481	27925	10965	16219	15372	18340	113443	202264	
December 23, 1918	69448	27481	10690	15932	15345	17708	112045	199201	
December 22, 1918									Sunday
December 21, 1918	69188	27371	10625	15860	15332	17492	106195	192875	
December 20, 1918	69014	27352	10574	15767	15321	17311	104129	190454	
December 19, 1918	68528	27238	10482	15514	15294	17022	99120	184670	
December 18, 1918	67979	27074	10396	15238	15271	16533	93980	178487	
December 17, 1918	67300	26811	10277	14962	15250	15996	88111	171467	
December 16, 1918	66927	26672	10211	14804	15240	15696	84139	166762	
December 15, 1918									Sunday
December 14, 1918	52859	26379	10042	14424	2014	15219	79216	147294	
December 13, 1918	50825	25607	9357	13906	1955	14772	69535	125132	
December 12, 1918	50184	25199	9337	13698	1950	14360	66207	120751	
December 11, 1918	49005	24554	9149	13384	1918	13813	63046	125864	
December 10, 1918	48502	24199	9149	13236	1918	13579	60885	122966	
December 9, 1918	47841	23767	9091	13072	1911	13032	58899	119772	
December 8, 1918									Sunday
December 7, 1918	46406	22899	8961	13039	1507	14002	53170	113586	
December 6, 1918	45454	22488	8792	12692	1482	13728	52223	111405	
December 5, 1918	44904	22283	8751	12396	1474	13611	51140	109655	
December 4, 1918	43709	21862	8441	11965	1441	13137	49779	106625	
December 3, 1918	42781	21794	8111	11448	1428	12769	49343	104893	
December 2, 1918	42202	21607	8049	11135	1411	12540	48650	103392	
December 1, 1918									Sunday

== November 1918 ==
Date	Total dead	Total KIA	Total dead from wounds	Total dead from disease	Total dead from accidents	Total MIA	Total WIA	Total casualties	References
November 30, 1918	38819	19980	7510	9968	1361	11291	47068	97178	
November 29, 1918	38152	19629	7343	9828	1352	10980	46831	95963	
November 28, 1918	36973	18978	7214	9434	1347	10571	46688	94232	
November 27, 1918	35875	18442	6994	9085	1354	10009	46180	92064	
November 26, 1918	34612	17726	6818	8738	1330	9475	45552	89662	
November 25, 1918	32948	16757	6605	8265	1321	9107	44887	86936	
November 24, 1918									Sunday
November 23, 1918	30985	15916	6356	7422	1291	8767	43282	83034	
November 22, 1918	30624	15916	6224	7193	1291	8630	43282	82536	
November 21, 1918	29955	15512	6136	7028	1279	8548	42458	80961	
November 20, 1918	29131	15152	5913	6790	1276	8207	41973	79311	
November 19, 1918	28569	14885	5768	6645	1271	8095	41245	77913	
November 18, 1918	27864	14652	5699	6244	1269	8007	40533	76404	
November 17, 1918									Sunday
November 16, 1918	27010	14205	5464	6087	1254	7765	40207	74982	
November 15, 1918	26474	14002	5308	5914	1250	7498	39934	73907	
November 14, 1918	25939	13780	5276	5638	1245	7220	39683	72842	
November 13, 1918	25392	13452	5161	5538	1241	7054	39321	71767	
November 12, 1918	24796	13142	5061	5369	1224	6963	38967	70726	
November 11, 1918	24059	12779	4922	5141	1217	6787	38678	69528	
November 10, 1918									Sunday
November 9, 1918	22530	11997	4661	4667	1205	6474	38073	67077	
November 8, 1918	21743	11634	4410	4497	1202	6478	37880	66096	
November 7, 1918	21270	11473	4410	4188	1199	6410	37600	65280	
November 6, 1918	20591	11223	4244	3944	1180	6284	37206	64091	
November 5, 1918	20432	11223	4185	3835	1189	6274	36391	63098	
November 4, 1918	20120	11099	4110	3727	1184	6229	35440	61779	
November 3, 1918									Sunday
November 2, 1918	19607	10882	3993	3556	1176	6227	34534	60368	
November 1, 1918	19607	10882	3993	3556	1176	6227	34212	60046	

== October 1918 ==
Date	Total dead	Total KIA	Total dead from wounds	Total dead from disease	Total dead from accidents	Total MIA	Total WIA	Total casualties	References
October 31, 1918	19552	10865	3982	3530	1175	6196	33657	59405	
October 30, 1918	19457	10827	3966	3493	1171	6193	33103	58753	
October 29, 1918	19391	10820	3949	3459	1163	6176	32763	58330	
October 28, 1918	19192	10766	3906	3367	1153	6109	32479		
October 27, 1918									Sunday
October 26, 1918						21	191		
October 25, 1918						17	453	59317	
October 24, 1918						66	457	54944	
October 23, 1918	18429	10568	3664	3075	1122	6080	29726	54244	
October 22, 1918	18038	10263	3632	3028	1115	6060	29692	53790	
October 21, 1918	17826	10159	3584	2974	1109	5996	28593	53872	
October 20, 1918									Sunday
October 19, 1918	16378	9682	3305	1073	2609	6068	27767	52918	
October 18, 1918	16295	9415	3276	1056	2548	5925	26144		
October 17, 1918	16223	9362	3264	1054	2543	5891	25909	51759	
October 16, 1918	16325	9397	3315	1057	2556	5939	26172	51971	
October 15, 1918	16095	9287	3253	1051	2504	5870	25634	51134	
October 14, 1918	15876	8293	3204	1043	2436	5772	24956	50139	
October 13, 1918									Sunday
October 12, 1918	15137	8806	3038	1021	2272	5630	24067	48301	
October 11, 1918	14758	8667	2922	1004	2165	5605	23800	47630	
October 10, 1918	14383	8487	2798	991	2107	5529	23428	46796	
October 9, 1918	14244	8405	2785	977	2077	5427	23086	46170	
October 8, 1918	13996	8280	2720	970	2026	5383	22756	45504	
October 7, 1918	13868	8202	2686	961	2016	5265	22407	44911	
October 6, 1918									Sunday
October 5, 1918	13250	7819	2514	949	1968	5248	21509	43378	
October 4, 1918	13087	7706	2483	941	1957	5182	21206	42846	
October 3, 1918	12886	7603	2416	934	1933	5009	20618	41870	
October 2, 1918	12669	7416	2389	932	1932	4941	20406	41353	
October 1, 1918	12359	7229	2313	918	1899	4890	19707	40248	

== September 1918 ==
Date	Total dead	Total KIA	Total dead from wounds	Total dead from disease	Total dead from accidents	Total MIA	Total WIA	Total casualties	References
September 30, 1918	12150	7105	2303	915	1899	4843	19263		
September 29, 1918									Sunday
September 28, 1918	11845	6929	2154	907	1878	5047	18306		
September 27, 1918	11678	6825	2100	898	1855	5044	18232		
September 26, 1918	11454	6654	2081	885	1834	4918	18078		
September 25, 1918	11179	6415	2045	885	1834	4891	18058		
September 24, 1918	11150	6400	2038	883	1829	4730	17873		
September 23, 1918	10999	6279	2017	879	1824	4701	17805		
September 22, 1918									Sunday
September 21, 1918	10536	6038	1866	852	1780	4482	17453		
September 20, 1918	10480	6005	1855	844	1776	4421	17296		
September 19, 1918		59	47			68	92		
September 18, 1918		74	31			24	128		
September 17, 1918		28	16			166	129		
September 16, 1918		6				75			
September 15, 1918									Sunday
September 14, 1918	10082	5758	1764	1734	826	3962	16575		
September 13, 1918		76	59			41	181		
September 12, 1918		56	39			202	372		
September 11, 1918		172	92			112			
September 10, 1918		156	67						
September 9, 1918		45	33			145	376		
September 8, 1918									Sunday
September 7, 1918		27	17				234		
September 6, 1918		50	35			139	143		
September 5, 1918		93	32						
September 4, 1918	83	53	7	15	8	75	244		
September 3, 1918	86	68	11	5	2	114	306		
September 2, 1918	57	37	13	6	1	54	207		
September 1, 1918									Sunday

== August 1918 ==
Date	Total dead	KIA OTD	Dead from wounds OTD	Dead from disease OTD	Dead from accidents OTD	MIA OTD	WIA OTD	Casualties OTD	References
August 31, 1918		65					140		
August 30, 1918		110				30	88		
August 29, 1918	50	24	19	7		23	161	234	
August 28, 1918	41	27	9	5		96	160	303	
August 27, 1918	60	41	18	1		3	90	156	
August 26, 1918	76	52	20	3	1	24	109	213	
August 25, 1918									Sunday
August 24, 1918		7	8				56		
August 23, 1918	57	27	18	11	1	35	40		
August 22, 1918		11	6			71	106	194	
August 21, 1918		24	9	2		64	62	161	
August 20, 1918		68		7		1	59	135	
August 19, 1918									
August 18, 1918									Sunday
August 17, 1918		17	1		2	19	51		
August 16, 1918		18					25		
August 15, 1918		17					95		
August 14, 1918	101	69	21	10	1				
August 13, 1918		14	3		1	1	71		
August 12, 1918	73	57	10	2	4	7	225		
August 11, 1918									Sunday
August 10, 1918	101	64	28	3	6	211	204		
August 9, 1918		90	9	2		303	64		
August 8, 1918		131	16	6			84		
August 7, 1918	126	114	9	1	2	105	640		
August 6, 1918		31	6	0	0	1	320		
August 6, 1918	6002	2863	993	1523	623	714	7512	14228	
August 5, 1918		203	37				148		
August 4, 1918									Sunday
August 3, 1918	139	112	11	11	5	9	58		
August 2, 1918	104	42	48	7	7	6	128		
August 1, 1918	42	12	12	11	7	4	63		

== July 1918 ==
Date	Total dead	KIA OTD	Dead from wounds OTD	Dead from disease OTD	Dead from accidents OTD	MIA OTD	WIA OTD	Casualties OTD	References
July 31, 1918									
July 30, 1918									
July 29, 1918									
July 28, 1918									
July 27, 1918	90	64	20	5	1	2	76		
July 26, 1918									
July 25, 1918	74	62	6	3	3	4	140		
July 24, 1918									
July 23, 1918	37	24	3	5	5	1	67		
July 22, 1918	33	9	14	7	3	17	12		
July 21, 1918									
July 20, 1918									
July 19, 1918									
July 18, 1918									
July 17, 1918									
July 16, 1918									
July 15, 1918	29	14	7	7	1	3	28		
July 14, 1918									
July 13, 1918									
July 12, 1918									
July 11, 1918									
July 10, 1918									
July 9, 1918	25	14	10	1		12	20		
July 8, 1918	19	6	11		2		29		
July 7, 1918									
July 6, 1918									
July 5, 1918	14	5	7	2	0	5	3		
July 4, 1918									
July 3, 1918									
July 2, 1918									
July 1, 1918									

== June 1918 ==
Date	Total dead	KIA OTD	Dead from wounds OTD	Dead from disease OTD	Dead from accidents OTD	MIA OTD	WIA OTD	Casualties OTD	References
June 30, 1918									
June 29, 1918	21	5	12	2	2	7	14		
June 28, 1918									
June 27, 1918									
June 26, 1918									
June 25, 1918									
June 24, 1918	14	8	4	2	0	0	48		
June 23, 1918									Sunday
June 22, 1918									
Jun21 1918	10	6	1	3	0	0	28		
Jun20 1918									
June 19, 1918	53	28	12	8	5	1	88		
June 18, 1918									
June 17, 1918	13	6	2	4	1	1	25		
June 16, 1918									Sunday
June 15, 1918									
June 14, 1918									
June 13, 1918	36	19	9	4	4	4	148		
June 12, 1918	60	15	9	18	18	1	65		
June 11, 1918									
June 10, 1918	22	13	5	1	3	1	53		
June 9, 1918									Sunday
June 8, 1918	56	30	10	6	10		52		
June 7, 1918	42	17	12	7	6	6	6		
June 6, 1918									
June 5, 1918									
June 4, 1918									
June 3, 1918	16	4	3	7	2	0	20		
June 2, 1918									Sunday
June 1, 1918	20	3	6	10	1	9	28		

== May 1918 ==
Date	Total dead	KIA OTD	Dead from wounds OTD	Dead from disease OTD	Dead from accidents OTD	MIA OTD	WIA OTD	Casualties OTD	References
May 31, 1918									
May 30, 1918	21	5	1	11	4	3	11		
May 29, 1918	21	5	5	10	1	5	7		
May 28, 1918									
May 27, 1918									
May 26, 1918									Sunday
May 25, 1918	11	4	4	3	0	0	12		
May 24, 1918									
May 23, 1918	37	14	12	11	0	1	48		
May 22, 1918									
May 21, 1918									
May 20, 1918									
May 19, 1918									Sunday
May 18, 1918	2288	741	188	1056	303	290	3446		
May 18, 1918	10	3	3	4	0	14	15		
May 17, 1918									
May 16, 1918									
May 15, 1918	9	3	3	5	8	9			
May 14, 1918									
May 13, 1918									
May 12, 1918									Sunday
May 11, 1918	26	8	4	4	10		38		
May 10, 1918	20	4	4	9	3		46		
May 9, 1918									
May 8, 1918									
May 7, 1918									
May 6, 1918									
May 5, 1918									Sunday
May 4, 1918									
May 3, 1918									
May 2, 1918									
May 1, 1918	1918	634	124	959	201	115	2626	4706	

== April 1918 ==
Date	Total dead	KIA OTD	Dead from wounds OTD	Dead from disease OTD	Dead from accidents OTD	MIA OTD	WIA OTD	Casualties OTD	References
April 30, 1918	1910	632	125	953	200	69	2580		
April 30, 1918	10	2	0	6	2	3	47		
April 29, 1918	40	18	6	13	3	4	112		
April 28, 1918									Sunday
April 27, 1918									
April 26, 1918		22	10		2		244		
April 25, 1918									
April 24, 1918		6	3	11			23		
April 23, 1918									
April 22, 1918	22	10	5	4	3	1	50		
April 21, 1918									Sunday
April 20, 1918	1754	556	94	913	191	105	1943		
April 20, 1918	17	7	8	2	0	2	23		
April 19, 1918									
April 18, 1918		47	6	13	2	4	113		
April 17, 1918									
April 16, 1918									
April 15, 1918	18	10	2	2	4	3	44		
April 14, 1918									Sunday
April 13, 1918									
April 12, 1918									
April 11, 1918	21	1	2	13	5	4	99		
April 10, 1918		18			18		300		
April 9, 1918									
April 8, 1918									
April 7, 1918									Sunday
April 6, 1918									
April 5, 1918		2					113		
April 4, 1918									
April 3, 1918					3		4		
April 2, 1918									
April 1, 1918									

== March 1918 ==
Date	Total dead	KIA OTD	Dead from wounds OTD	Dead from disease OTD	Dead from accidents OTD	MIA OTD	WIA OTD	Casualties OTD	References
March 31, 1918									Sunday
March 30, 1918	1427	458	46	762	161		753	2236	
March 30, 1918	10	1	2	5	2		21	32	
March 29, 1918	19	1	2	5	11		21		
March 28, 1918									
March 27, 1918									
March 26, 1918		2		7	3		11		
March 25, 1918									
March 24, 1918									Sunday
March 23, 1918									
March 22, 1918									
March 21, 1918									
March 20, 1918	15	3	2	8	2		22		
March 19, 1918									
March 18, 1918									
March 17, 1918									Sunday
March 16, 1918									
March 15, 1918									
March 14, 1918	16	4	2	9	1		54		
March 13, 1918		6	2	7			13		
March 12, 1918		8					23		
March 11, 1918									
March 10, 1918									Sunday
March 9, 1918		5		8	2				
March 8, 1918									
March 7, 1918		5					16		
March 6, 1918									
March 5, 1918									
March 4, 1918									
March 3, 1918									Sunday
March 2, 1918									
March 1, 1918		1		4	3		21		

== February 1918 ==
Date	Total dead	KIA OTD	Dead from wounds OTD	Dead from disease OTD	Dead from accidents OTD	MIA OTD	WIA OTD	Casualties OTD	References
February 28, 1918									
February 27, 1918		5					61		
February 26, 1918									
February 25, 1918									
February 24, 1918									Sunday
February 23, 1918									
February 22, 1918									
February 21, 1918									
February 20, 1918									
February 19, 1918									
February 18, 1918									
February 17, 1918									Sunday
February 16, 1918									
February 15, 1918									
February 14, 1918									
February 13, 1918									
February 12, 1918									
February 11, 1918									
February 10, 1918									Sunday
February 9, 1918									
February 8, 1918									
February 7, 1918		1					6		
February 6, 1918		1		4			11		
February 5, 1918									
February 4, 1918									
February 3, 1918									Sunday
February 2, 1918									
February 1, 1918									

== January 1918 ==
Date	Total dead	KIA OTD	Dead from wounds OTD	Dead from disease OTD	Dead from accidents OTD	MIA OTD	WIA OTD	Casualties OTD	References
January 31, 1918									
January 30, 1918									
January 29, 1918		4							
January 28, 1918									
January 27, 1918									Sunday
January 26, 1918									
January 25, 1918		4		7					
January 24, 1918									
January 23, 1918		3							
January 22, 1918		1							
January 21, 1918									
January 20, 1918									Sunday
January 19, 1918									
January 18, 1918									
January 17, 1918									
January 16, 1918									
January 15, 1918									
January 14, 1918									
January 13, 1918									Sunday
January 12, 1918									
January 11, 1918									
January 10, 1918									
January 9, 1918									
January 8, 1918									
January 7, 1918									
January 6, 1918									Sunday
January 5, 1918									
January 4, 1918									
January 3, 1918									
January 2, 1918									
January 1, 1918									

== December 1917 ==
Date	Total dead	KIA OTD	Dead from wounds OTD	Dead from disease OTD	Dead from accidents OTD	MIA OTD	WIA OTD	Casualties OTD	References
December 31, 1917									
December 30, 1917									Sunday
December 29, 1917									
December 28, 1917									
December 27, 1917									
December 26, 1917		7							
December 25, 1917									
December 24, 1917	8		2	6					
December 23, 1917									Sunday
December 22, 1917									
December 21, 1917									
December 20, 1917									
December 19, 1917									
December 18, 1917									
December 17, 1917					2				
December 16, 1917									Sunday
December 15, 1917	11		1	7	2				
December 14, 1917									
December 13, 1917				1			2		
December 12, 1917									
December 11, 1917									
December 10, 1917				2					
December 9, 1917									Sunday
December 8, 1917									
December 7, 1917									
December 6, 1917									
December 5, 1917									
December 4, 1917									
December 3, 1917									
December 2, 1917									Sunday
December 1, 1917									

== November 1917 ==
Date	Total dead	KIA OTD	Dead from wounds OTD	Dead from disease OTD	Dead from accidents OTD	MIA OTD	WIA OTD	Casualties OTD	References
November 30, 1917							13		
November 29, 1917									
November 28, 1917									
November 27, 1917									
November 26, 1917									
November 25, 1917									Sunday
November 24, 1917									
November 23, 1917									
November 22, 1917									
November 21, 1917		1					1		
November 20, 1917									
November 19, 1917		2					6		
November 18, 1917									Sunday
November 17, 1917									
November 16, 1917									
November 15, 1917		1							
November 14, 1917									
November 13, 1917									
November 12, 1917									
November 11, 1917									Sunday
November 10, 1917									
November 9, 1917									
November 8, 1917									
November 7, 1917									
November 6, 1917									
November 5, 1917									
November 4, 1917									Sunday
November 3, 1917		3				12	5		
November 2, 1917					2				
November 1, 1917									

== See also ==
- Deadliest single days of World War I
- List of maritime disasters in World War I
- List of battles with most United States military fatalities
- World War I casualties

== Bibliography ==
Notes

References

- Byerly, Carol R. (2010). "The U.S. Military and the Influenza Pandemic of 1918–1919". Public Health Reports. 125 (Suppl 3). United States National Library of Medicine: 82–91. doi:10.1177/00333549101250S311. ISSN 1468-2877. PMC 2862337. PMID 20568570.
- DeBruyne, Nese F. (2017). American War and Military Operations Casualties: Lists and Statistics (PDF). Congressional Research Service. - Total pages: 38
- Hepp, John Henry (2003). The Middle-Class City: Transforming Space and Time in Philadelphia, 1876-1926. University of Pennsylvania Press. ISBN 9780812204056. - Total pages: 288
- "Casualty List In First Action Thrills Nation". Evening Public Ledger. Philadelphia: Cyrus H. K. Curtis. November 5, 1917. pp. 1–22. ISSN 2151-3945. LCCN 83045211. OCLC 9355469.
- "Pershing Reports 387 U.S. Casualties". Evening Public Ledger. Philadelphia: Cyrus H. K. Curtis. September 28, 1918. pp. 1–20. ISSN 2151-3945. LCCN 83045211. OCLC 9355469.
- "Addressless list of casualties given - War Office issues names after information committee refuses". Evening Public Ledger. Philadelphia: Cyrus H. K. Curtis. March 9, 1918. pp. 1–20. ISSN 2151-3945. LCCN 83045211. OCLC 9355469.
- "Prevent publication of all casualty lists". Evening Public Ledger. Philadelphia: Cyrus H. K. Curtis. April 2, 1918. pp. 1–18. ISSN 2151-3945. LCCN 83045211. OCLC 9355469.
- "Gen. Pershing Reports One Killed In Action". The New York Times. 1918. ISSN 0362-4331. OCLC 1645522.
- "The Press: Again, Curtis-Martin". Time. March 17, 1930. ISSN 0040-781X. OCLC 1311479.
- Wevera, Peter C Wevera; van Bergenc, Leo (June 27, 2014). "Death from 1918 pandemic influenza during the First World War: a perspective from personal and anecdotal evidence". Influenza and Other Respiratory Viruses. 8 (5). United States National Library of Medicine: 538–546. doi:10.1111/irv.12267. PMC 4181817. PMID 24975798.
