= Association for the Recovery of the Fallen in Eastern Europe =

German non-profit organization

Association for the Recovery of the Fallen in Eastern Europe (VBGO, German for: Verein zur Bergung Gefallener in Osteuropa e.V.) is a German non-profit organization, dedicated to the uncovering of the remains of fallen soldiers. The organization was founded in 1992 and aims to "permit a worthy burial of the dead of war and to return them their names".
