= A.P. and anti-tire mine =

- Type: Anti-personnel and anti-vehicle mine
- Place of origin: Great Britain

Service history
- Used by: Great Britain
- Wars: World War II

Specifications
- Mass: 0.31lb(0.14kg)
- Height: 1.125in(2.85cm)
- Diameter: 2in(5.08cm)
- Filling weight: 0.125lb(0.056kg)

The A.P. and anti-tire mine was a British anti-personnel mine and anti-vehicle mine used in World War II.

== Design ==
=== Parts ===
The mine's exterior is made up of two circular steel half. The bottom half is smaller than the top. The bottom half contains the detonator system which makes the mine blow up. The top half contains the actual explosive which is in the shape of a circle without the middle. The explosive is attached to the top half through some substance which holds it in place.

=== Detonation process ===
The mine is triggered by pressure on top of it by something above compressing the mine. This causes the detonator retainer to go down onto a cap retainer sleeve which coils the striker spring. This simultaneously making the striker go through shear wire. When the striker goes through the shear wire the force of the striker springs makes the striker go further and makes contact with a percussion cap. The flames made by the striker coming into contact with the percussion cap go through holes in the mine activating the two detonators which in turn detonate the mines explosive contents.

=== Arming and disarming ===
The mine is armed by putting the detonator retainer over the percussion cap retaining sleeve and screwing the percussion cap into the lower half of the mine. Then the larger upper half is placed on the smaller lower half. Disarming the mine involves doing the opposite of arming and also there is no safety as that cannot be used to neutralise it the mine is basic.

== Service ==
This mine was intended to be used by airborne units. Its light charge means it is only capable of damaging tires on motor vehicles but it is sufficient to severely injure a soldier and possibly kill them and will definitely make anyone that steps on it a casualty.
