= Deadliest single days of World War I =

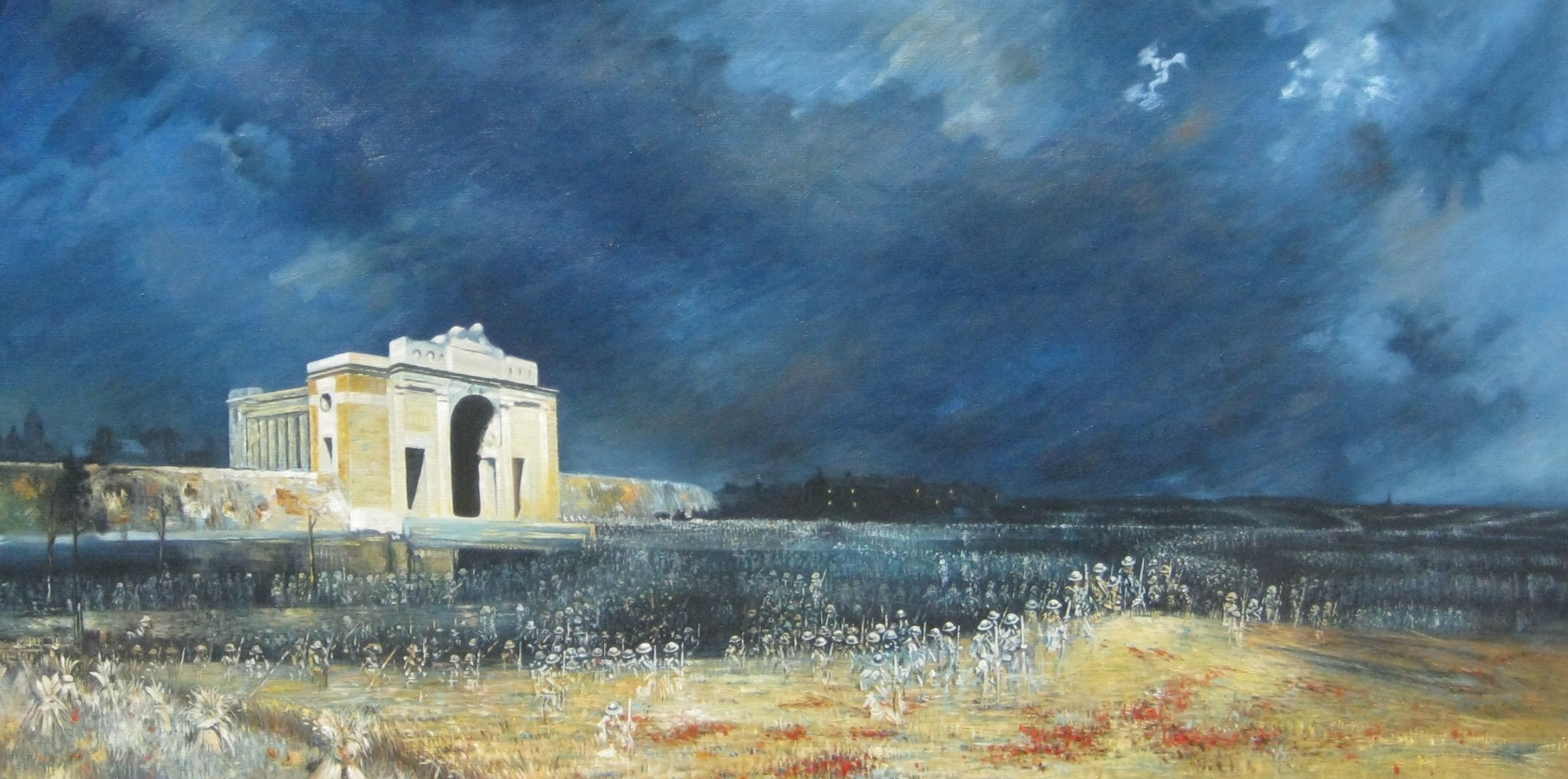
Will Longstaff's Menin Gate at Midnight

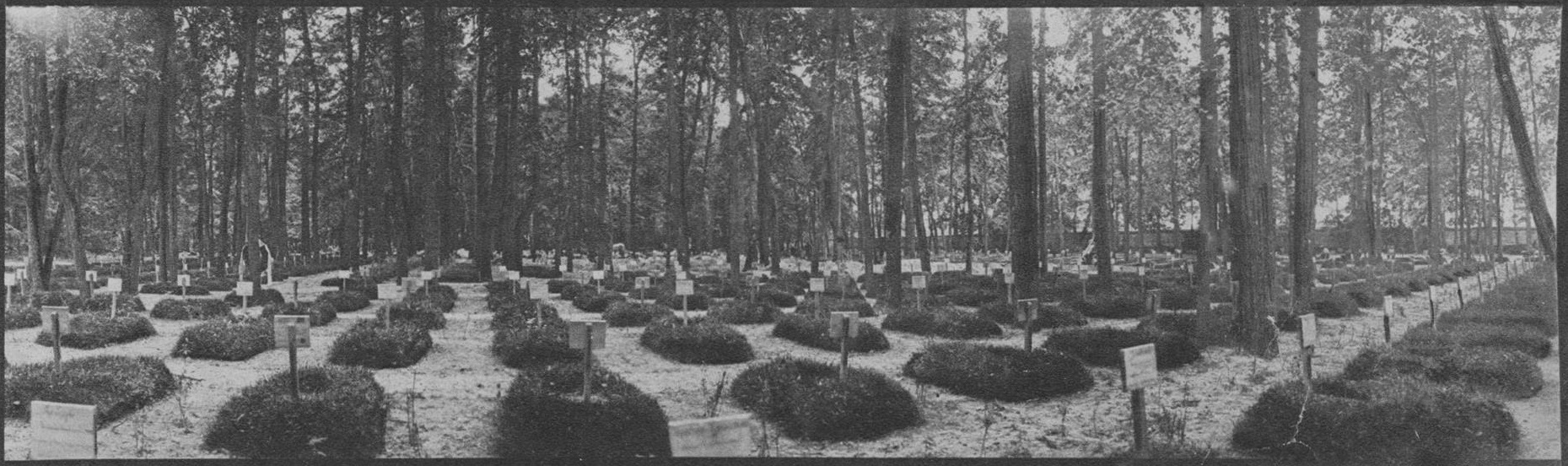
Moscow City Brotherly Cemetery in 1915

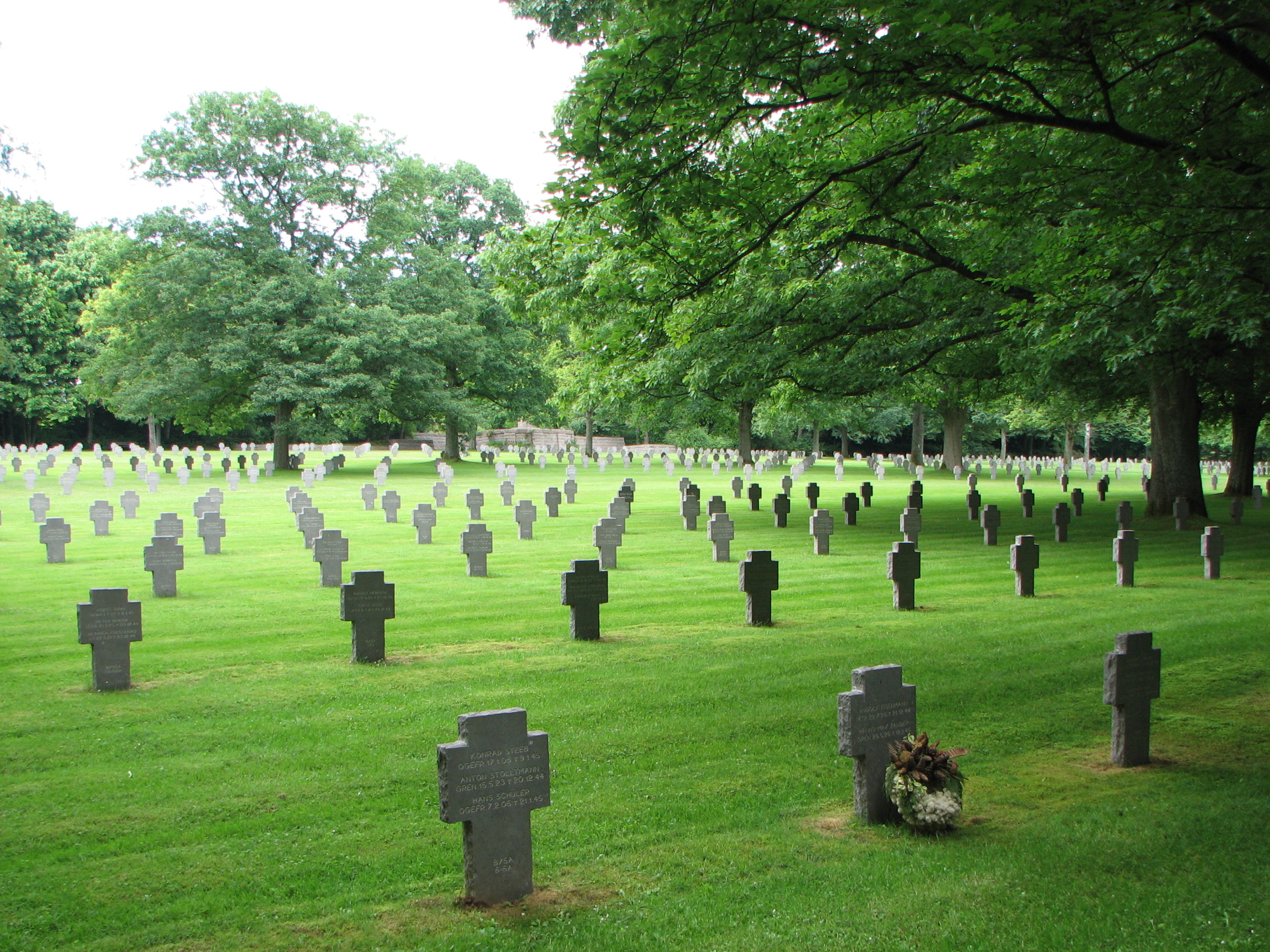
Sandweiler German war cemetery in Luxembourg

World War I was fought on many fronts around the world from the battlefields of Europe to the far-flung colonies in the Pacific and Africa. While it is most famous for the trench warfare stalemate that existed on Europe's Western Front, in other theatres of combat the fighting was mobile and often involved set-piece battles and cavalry charges. The Eastern Front often took thousands of casualties a day during the major offensive pushes, but it was the west that saw the most concentrated slaughter. It was in the west that the newly industrialized world powers could focus their end products of the military–industrial complex. The deadliest day of the war was during the opening days of the conflict. The Imperial German war council had initiated the Schlieffen Plan which involved multiple armies flooding through the borders of Belgium and France. On August 22, 1914, during the Battle of the Frontiers, five separate French armies engaged the German invaders independently of each other. Across all those battlefields, on that single day, 27,000 French soldiers lost their lives protecting their country.

The term casualty in warfare is often misunderstood. It often refers not to those who are killed on the battlefield but to those who can no longer fight. That can include disabled by injuries, disabled by psychological trauma, captured, deserted, or missing. A casualty is, by definition, a soldier who is no longer available for the immediate battle or campaign, the major consideration in combat. The number of casualties is simply the number of members of a unit who are not available for duty. For example, on March 21, 1918, during the opening day of the German spring offensive, the Germans casualties are broken down into 10,851 killed, 28,778 wounded, 300 POW (or taken prisoner) for a total of 39,929 casualties. The word casualty has been used in a military context since at least 1513. In this article, the numbers killed refer to those killed in action, killed by disease, or killed by their wounds.

== Western Front ==
Country	Battle, siege, or offensive	Date	Number killed on this day	Total killed during WWI	% of total killed	References
France	Battle of the Frontiers	August 22, 1914	27,000	1,357,000	2%	
United Kingdom	Battle of the Somme	July 1, 1916	19,240	744,000	3%	
German Empire	Kaiserschlacht	March 21, 1918	10,851	2,037,000	0.53%	
Canada	Battle of Vimy Ridge	April 9, 1917	2,414	56,639	4%	
Australia	Battle of Broodseinde	October 4, 1917	1,282	61,527	2%	
New Zealand	First Battle of Passchendaele	October 12, 1917	847	18,166	5%	
Belgium	Massacre at Dinant	August 23, 1914	674	38,170	2%	
First Portuguese Republic	Battle of the Lys	April 9, 1918	500~ (Note: Portuguese faced the Germans for three days, from April 9–11, 1918. Around 500–700 were killed in action, mostly on the first day)	7,222	7%	
United States	Battle of Saint-Mihiel	September 12, 1918	2,500~	116,516	2.15%	
Newfoundland	Battle at Beaumont-Hamel (Somme)	July 1, 1916	310	1,204	26%	
South Africa	Battle of Delville Wood	July 18, 1916	253	7,121	4%	
Russian Empire (until 1917)				1,700,000		
Thailand SEF (from 1918)	Base Hospital No. 57	February 7, 1919	2 (Note: Two died after the war had ended. Three others died during the war on three different days: February 11, 1918 March 1, 1918 October 21, 1918)	19	11%	

== Eastern Front ==
Country	Battle, Siege, or Offensive	Date	Number killed on this day	Total killed during WWI	% of total killed	References
Russian Empire				1,700,000		
German Empire				2,037,000		
Romania				335,706		
Bulgaria				101,229 (Note: Killed 48,917 + Died of wounds 13,198 + Accidental deaths 888 + Died of disease 24,497 + Missing presumed dead 13,729)		
Austria-Hungary				1,200,000		
Ottoman Empire				325,000 (Note: Killed 50,000 + Died of wounds 35,000 + Died of disease 240,000)		

== Naval battles ==
Country	Battle, siege, or offensive	Date	Number killed on this day	Total killed during WWI	% of total killed	References
United Kingdom	Battle of Jutland	May 31, 1916	6,094	744,000	1%	
German Empire	Battle of Jutland	May 31, 1916	2,551	2,037,000	0.13%	
Italy	SS Principe Umberto	June 8, 1916	1,926	460,000	0.48%	
France	SS Gallia	October 4, 1916	1,338	1,357,000	0.1%	
Austria-Hungary	SS Linz	March 18, 1918	697 (Note: Hundreds of unregistered passengers, mostly Austro-Hungarian soldiers returning from leave who boarded Linz illegally at Zelenika. Some estimations go as high as 2,700 people killed)	1,200,000	0.06%	
Russian Empire	Pallada	October 11, 1914	597	1,700,000	0.04%	
Empire of Japan	Kawachi	July 12, 1918	500–700 (Note: Sources differ widely on the exact number of men killed. Gardiner and Gray and Jentschura, Jung and Mickel agree on 700, but Lengerer says 600 and Kingsepp gives 618 killed from a crew of 960)	4,661	13%	
United States	USS Cyclops	After March 4, 1918 (Note: Cyclops was last seen outside of Baltimore on March 4, 1918)	309	116,516	0.3%	
Ottoman Empire	Barbaros Hayreddin (Note: On 3 May 1915 the steamer Gul Djemal with 4000 troops on board was torpedoed and sunk by HM Submarine E-14. The number of casualties are unknown; the British claimed many were lost, while German and Turkish records report limited casualties only.)	August 8, 1915	258	325,000 (Note: Killed 50,000 + Died of wounds 35,000 + Died of disease 240,000)	0.07%	
Canada	HMHS Llandovery Castle	June 27, 1918	234	56,639	0.4%	

== Gallipoli campaign ==
Country	Battle, siege, or offensive	Date	Number killed on this day	Total killed during WWI	% of total killed	References
Ottoman Empire	Third attack on Anzac Cove	May 19, 1915	5,000~	325,000 (Note: Killed 50,000 + Died of wounds 35,000 + Died of disease 240,000)	2%	
France	First Battle of Krithia	April 28, 1915	1,001 (Note: 14,000 Allied troops participated in the battle and suffered 2,000 British and 1,001 French casualties)	1,357,000	0.7%	
United Kingdom	Battle of Scimitar Hill	August 21, 1915	1,497 (Note: 5,300 casualties out of the 14,300 soldiers who participated)	744,000	0.2%	
Australia	ANZAC Cove	April 25, 1915, August 7, 1915 (Note: Both days saw 755 Australians die)	755	61,527	1.2%	
New Zealand	Battle of Sari Bair	August 8, 1915	507	18,166	3%	
India	Third Battle of Krithia	June 4, 1915	207 (Note: 220 Indians died on all fronts)	42,448 (Note: In Gallipoli 1,358 Indians died, 3421 were wounded for a total of 4,779 casualties) (Note: Excludes followers)	0.5%	

== Italian Front ==
Country	Battle, Siege, or Offensive	Date	Number killed on this day	Total killed during WWI	% of total killed	References
Italy				460,000		
France				1,357,000		
United Kingdom				744,000		
German Empire				2,037,000		
Austria-Hungary				1,200,000		

== Macedonian front ==
Country	Battle, Siege, or Offensive	Date	Number killed on this day	Total killed during WWI	% of total killed	References
Greece				6,000~		
Serbia				127,535 (Note: Killed 45,000 + Missing presumed dead 82,535)		
Italy				460,000		
France				1,357,000		
United Kingdom				744,000		
Russian Empire				1,700,000		
German Empire				2,037,000		
Bulgaria				101,229 (Note: Killed 48,917 + Died of wounds 13,198 + Accidental deaths 888 + Died of disease 24,497 + Missing presumed dead 13,729)		
Austria-Hungary				1,200,000		
Ottoman Empire				325,000 (Note: Killed 50,000 + Died of wounds 35,000 + Died of disease 240,000)		

== See also ==
- Surviving American units with the highest percentage of casualties per conflict
- List of maritime disasters in World War I
- World War I casualties
- List of battles with most United States military fatalities
- General Pershing WWI casualty list

== Sources ==
- Anglesey, Lord (1995). A History of the British Cavalry: Volume 8: 1816-1919 The Western Front, 1915-1918, Epilogue, 1919-1939. Pen and Sword. ISBN 9781473815056. - Total pages: 224
- Aspinall-Oglander, C. F. (1992). Military Operations: Gallipoli. Imperial War Museum. ISBN 9780898391756. - Total pages: 602
- Auckland War Memorial Museum (2017). "World War One Hall of Memories". Auckland War Memorial Museum. Archived from the original on January 25, 2019.
- BBC News (2017). "WW1: Why was the first day of the Somme such a disaster?". BBC News.
- Brown, Meredith Mason (2013). Touching America's History: From the Pequot War Through World War II. Indiana University Press. ISBN 9780253008336. - Total pages: 271
- Commonwealth War Graves Commission AUS 4-25 (2017). "Australia April 25, 1915". Commonwealth War Graves Commission.
- Commonwealth War Graves Commission AUS 8-7 (2017). "Australia August 7, 1915". Commonwealth War Graves Commission.
- Commonwealth War Graves Commission AUS 10-4 (2020). "Australia October 4, 1917". Commonwealth War Graves Commission.
- Commonwealth War Graves Commission IND 6-04 - Total (2017). "ALL Indians June 4, 1915". Commonwealth War Graves Commission.
- Commonwealth War Graves Commission IND 6-04 (2017). "India June 4, 1915". Commonwealth War Graves Commission.
- Commonwealth War Graves Commission NZ (2017). "New Zealand October 12, 1917". Commonwealth War Graves Commission.
- Commonwealth War Graves Commission SA (2017). "South Africa July 18, 1916". Commonwealth War Graves Commission.
- Commonwealth War Graves Commission NZ-ME (2017). "New Zealand in Gallipoli". Commonwealth War Graves Commission.
- Commonwealth War Graves Commission UK 8-21 (2017). "United Kingdom in Gallipoli". Commonwealth War Graves Commission.
- DeBruyne, Nese F. (2017). American War and Military Operations Casualties: Lists and Statistics (PDF). Congressional Research Service. - Total pages: 38
- Dickmann, Nancy (2017). The Horror of World War I. Raintree. ISBN 9781474749381. - Total pages: 48
- Ellis, John; Cox, Michael (2001). The World War I Databook: The Essential Facts and Figures for All the Combatants. Aurum Press. ISBN 9781854107664. - Total pages: 323
- Grohman, Adam M. (2008). Claimed by the Sea - Long Island Shipwrecks. LULU.com. ISBN 9780578008073. - Total pages: 241
- Helgason, Guðmundur (2017a). "Ships hit during WWI: Principe Umberto". uboat.net.
- Helgason, Guðmundur (2017b). "Ships hit during WWI: Armed merchant cruiser Gallia". uboat.net.
- Helgason, Guðmundur (2017c). "Ships hit during WWI: Sailing ship Cantatrice". uboat.net.
- International Labour Office (1923). "Tom 4, II Les tués et les disparus". Enquête Sur la Production. Rapport Général. Paris Berger-Levrault. OCLC 6445561.
- Langensiepen, Bernd; Güleryüz, Ahmet (1995). The Ottoman Steam Navy 1828–1923. London: Conway Maritime Press. ISBN 978-0-85177-610-1.
- Lucas, Jon (November 5, 2017). "10 Deadliest Days on WWI's Western Front".
- Moorehead, Alan (1998). Gallipoli. Wordsworth Editions. ISBN 9781853266751. - Total pages: 319
- Middlebrook, Martin (2007). The Kaiser's Battle. Pen and Sword. ISBN 9781844154982. - Total pages: 430
- Ministry for Culture and Heritage (December 5, 2014). "NZ Gallipoli casualties by month". Ministry for Culture and Heritage.
- Ministry for Culture and Heritage (March 1, 2016). "Gallipoli casualties by country". Government of New Zealand.
- Nash, Jay Robert (1976). Darkest Hours. Rowman & Littlefield. ISBN 9781590775264. - Total pages: 826
- Porter, Ken; Wynn, Stephen (2015). Castle Point in the Great War. Pen and Sword. ISBN 9781473855175. - Total pages: 176
- Pyles, Jesse (2012). "The Portuguese Expeditionary Corps in World War I: From Inception to Combat Destruction, 1914-1918" (PDF). University of North Texas.
- Reichswehr (1934). "Heeres-Sanitaetsinspektion im Reichskriegsministeriums". Sanitaetsbericht über das Deutsche Heer, (Deutsches Feld- und Besatzungsheer), Im Weltkriege 1914–1918 (in German). 3 (Sec. 1).
- Sondhaus, Lawrence (2014). The Great War at Sea: A Naval History of the First World War. Cambridge University Press. ISBN 9781107036901. - Total pages: 407
- Trouillard, Stéphanie (August 22, 2014). "August 22, 1914: The bloodiest day in French military history". France 24.
- Veterans Affairs Canada (2017). "Canada - April 9, 1917". Veterans Affairs Canada.
- Veterans Affairs Canada (November 5, 2015). "The Opening Day, Battle of the Somme, 1916". Veterans Affairs Canada.
- War Office, United Kingdom (1922). Statistics of the Military Effort of the British Empire During the Great War. 1914-1920. Her Majesty's Stationery Office (HMSO). - Total pages: 880
- Wrecksite.eu (2017). "SS Linz [+1918]". wrecksite.eu.
- Whyte, Brendan and Suthida (2008). "The Inscriptions on the First World War Volunteers Memorial, Bangkok" (PDF). Journal of the Siam Society, Vol. 96.
