= American units with the highest percentage of casualties per conflict =

During warfare, some units take more casualties than other units. Sometimes, the casualty rate is disproportionately high. This article displays the highest percentage of casualties among American units, including those wiped out as an effective force.

The term casualty in warfare can often be confusing. It often refers not to those that are killed on the battlefield but to those who can no longer fight. That can include disabled by injuries, disabled by psychological trauma, captured, deserted, or missing. A casualty is just a soldier who is no longer available for the immediate battle or campaign, the major consideration in combat. The number of casualties is simply the number of members of a unit who are not available for duty. For example, during the Seven Days Battles in the American Civil War (June 25 to July 1, 1862) there were 5,228 killed, 23,824 wounded and 7,007 missing or taken prisoner for a total of 36,059 casualties. (Note: Union and Confederate numbers added together) The word casualty has been used in a military context since at least 1513.

== Battles ==
Unit	Conflict	Deployment	Unit size	KIA	WIA	MIA	POW	Total	Casualty rate (%)	Opposing force	Fate
2nd Infantry Regiment	St. Clair's defeat	November 4, 1791 (1 day of combat)	900	632	264			896	99.56	Northwestern Confederacy inclu. Cherokee, Delaware and others	Unit effectively destroyed, later replenished. A House of Representatives investigation was carried out to investigate the disaster, being the first Congressional Special Committee investigation.
1st Minnesota Infantry Regiment	Battle of Gettysburg, second day	July 2, 1863	262			0	0	215 (Note: The 215 casualty figure is disputed. Morning muster on July 2 for the eight companies (A,B,D,E,G,H,I & K) involved in the suicidal attack was 262, and evening muster on the same day was 47. To arrive at the casualty figure of 215, the Regimental Historian (Lt. Wm. Lochren) subtracted the muster figures (262-47=215)(82.1%) and asserted that "[every one of the] 215 [missing men] lay upon the field." Conducting an enumeration by individual names in 1982, Robert W. Meinhard of Winona State University accounted for only 179 (68.3%) casualties for the single day of July 2, 1863. Presumably, Meinhard's and Lochren's conclusions are each based upon the same handwritten records from the regiment; accounting for the disputed 36 (=215-179) soldiers is the prerogative of the reader.)	82	(Confederate States of America) Confederacy	Survivors reinforced by remaining companies of the regiment. Captured the 28th Virginia Colors at Picketts Charge the next day. Continued to serve in the Army of the Potomac until completion of enlistment on April 29, 1864. Majority of veterans formed the core of the new 1st Minnesota Volunteer Infantry Battalion.
7th Cavalry Regiment	Battle of the Little Bighorn	June 25–26, 1876	700~	268	59	0	0	327	45~	Combined Native American Army Arapaho tribe Cheyenne tribe Lakota tribes	Unit effectively destroyed as a fighting force on 26 June 1876. Later replenished
4th Marine Regiment	Battle of Corregidor	May 5–6, 1942 (2 days of combat)	~4,000	315	357	15	1,388	~4,000	Nearly Total	Japan	4th Marine Regiment was destroyed only a few surviving Marines and personnel made up what was left of the regiment. The regiment was dissolved by Gen. Wainwright by his own will. Unit re-established in February 1944.
36th Infantry Division	Attack across the Gari River	January 22–24, 1944 (2 days of combat)	6,000	143	663	875		1,681	28.01	Germany	141st and 143rd Infantry Regiments destroyed as a fighting force. US Congress investigation to establish responsibility for the disaster in 1946.
1st, 3rd and 4th Ranger Battalion	Battle of Cisterna	January 30, 1944 (1 day of combat)	767	311			450	761	99	Germany	1st, 3rd and 4th Ranger Battalions destroyed.1st Ranger Battalion reconstituted on 1 September 1948.3rd Ranger Battalion redesignated on 21 June 1954. 4th Ranger Battalion disbanded.
1st Marine Regiment	Battle of Peleliu	September 15–21, 1944 (7 days of combat)	~3,000					1,749	58	Japan	Regiment relieved from combat, ineffective as a fighting force but not broken.
28th Infantry Division	Battle of Hürtgen Forest	September 19, 1944	16,266					6,184	38.01	Germany	28th Infantry Division destroyed as a fighting force. Unit withdrawn for action. Later replentished.
2nd Infantry Division	Battle of the Ch'ongch'on River	November 26–30, 1950 (4 days of combat)	~14,000					4,163	30	China; North Korea	Major General Laurence B. Keiser commander of 2nd Infantry Division was relieved from command by the end of the battle.

== US units with most casualties per conflict ==
Unit	Conflict	Deployment	Unit size	KIA	WIA	MIA	POW	Total	Casualty rate (%)	Opposing force
1st Minnesota Volunteer Infantry	American Civil War	Apr 29, 1861 - Apr 28, 1864		286	609			895		(Confederate States of America) Confederacy
1st Infantry Division	World War I	October 23, 1917 - Nov 11, 1918		4,964	17,201	1,056		23,221		German Empire
Harlem Hellfighters	World War I	Apr 8 - Nov 11, 1918 (191 days at the front)	3,832 (Note: 1915 to 1917 infantry regiments grew from 959 to 3,720 men and 112 officers)					1500	40~	German Empire
3rd Infantry Division	World War II	Nov 8, 1942-May 8, 1945 (553 days of combat)	6,000	4,922	18,766	554	1735	25,977		Germany Vichy France (Italy) Italian Social Republic; 1943–1945; Kingdom of Italy; 1942–1943
1st Marine Division (Note: 1st Marine Division was the unit with most casualties suffered during the Korean War with 29,868; including 4,004 KIA and 25,864 wounded. Regarding killed in action the 2nd Infantry Division was the unit with the highest ratio with 7,094 KIA and 16,575 wounded.)	Korean War	1950-1953		4,004	25,864			29,868		China; North Korea
1st Cavalry Division (Note: 1st Cavalry Division was the unit with most casualties suffered during the Vietnam War with 32,036; including 5,444 KIA and 26,592 wounded. Regarding killed in action the 1st Marine Division was the unit with the highest ratio with 7,012 KIA.)	Vietnam War	Aug 1965 - Aug 1972 (Note: 1/9 Cavalry Major Donald Radcliff, the 1st Cavalry's first combat death, who was killed on 18 August 1965 while supporting U.S. Marines in his helicopter gunship during Operation Starlite.)		5,444	26,592			32,036		North Vietnam Viet Cong
14th Quartermaster Detachment (Note: The 14th Quartermaster Detachment suffered the greatest number of casualties of any allied unit during Operation Desert Storm when an Iraqi Al Hussein Scud missile destroyed the installations the unit was located, after the failure in a Patriot air defense system that did not track the Iraqi missile location.)	Gulf War	1990-1991	69	13	43	0	0	56	81.0	Iraq
3rd Battalion, 5th Marines	War in Afghanistan	2001-2011	950	25	150			175	18.4	(Afghanistan) Taliban

== See also ==
- Deadliest single days of World War I
- List of battles with most United States military fatalities

== Sources ==
- Brown, Al (2012). My Comrades and Me: Staff Sergeant Al Brown's Wwii Memoirs. FriesenPress. ISBN 9781770971875. - Total pages: 290
- Holcombe, R. I. (Return Ira); Searles, Jasper Newton & Taylor, Mathew F; Colvill Commission (1916). History of the First Regiment Minnesota Volunteer Infantry, 1861-1864 : with maps and illustrations. Stillwater, Minn. : Easton & Masterman, printers. OCLC 04090632. - Total pages: 508
- Maciejewski, Jeffrey (July 2011). "Buying Time". America's Civil War. Weider History Group. ISSN 1046-2899.
- Meinhard, Robert W (July 1991). "The First Minnesota at Gettysburg : no soldiers ever displayed grander heroism". Gettysburg Magazine. 5: 79–88. OCLC 32538531.
- Murray, Stuart (2004). Atlas of American Military History. Infobase Publishing. ISBN 9781438130255. - Total pages: 257
- Nelson, Peter (2009). A More Unbending Battle: The Harlem Hellfighter's Struggle for Freedom in WWI and Equality at Home. Basic Books. ISBN 978-0-7867-4467-1.
- Tucker, Spencer C. (2013). Almanac of American Military History, Volume 1. ABC-CLIO. ISBN 9781598845303. - Total pages: 2524
- Walker, Mark (March 24, 2011). "MILITARY: Marine unit that suffered most casualties coming home". The San Diego Union-Tribune.
- Willbanks, James H. (2013). Vietnam War Almanac: An In-Depth Guide to the Most Controversial Conflict in American History. Skyhorse Publishing, Inc. ISBN 9781626365285. - Total pages: 608
- Woodward, David (2014). The American Army and the First World War. Cambridge University Press. ISBN 9781107011441. - Total pages: 465
