= List of battles with most United States military fatalities =

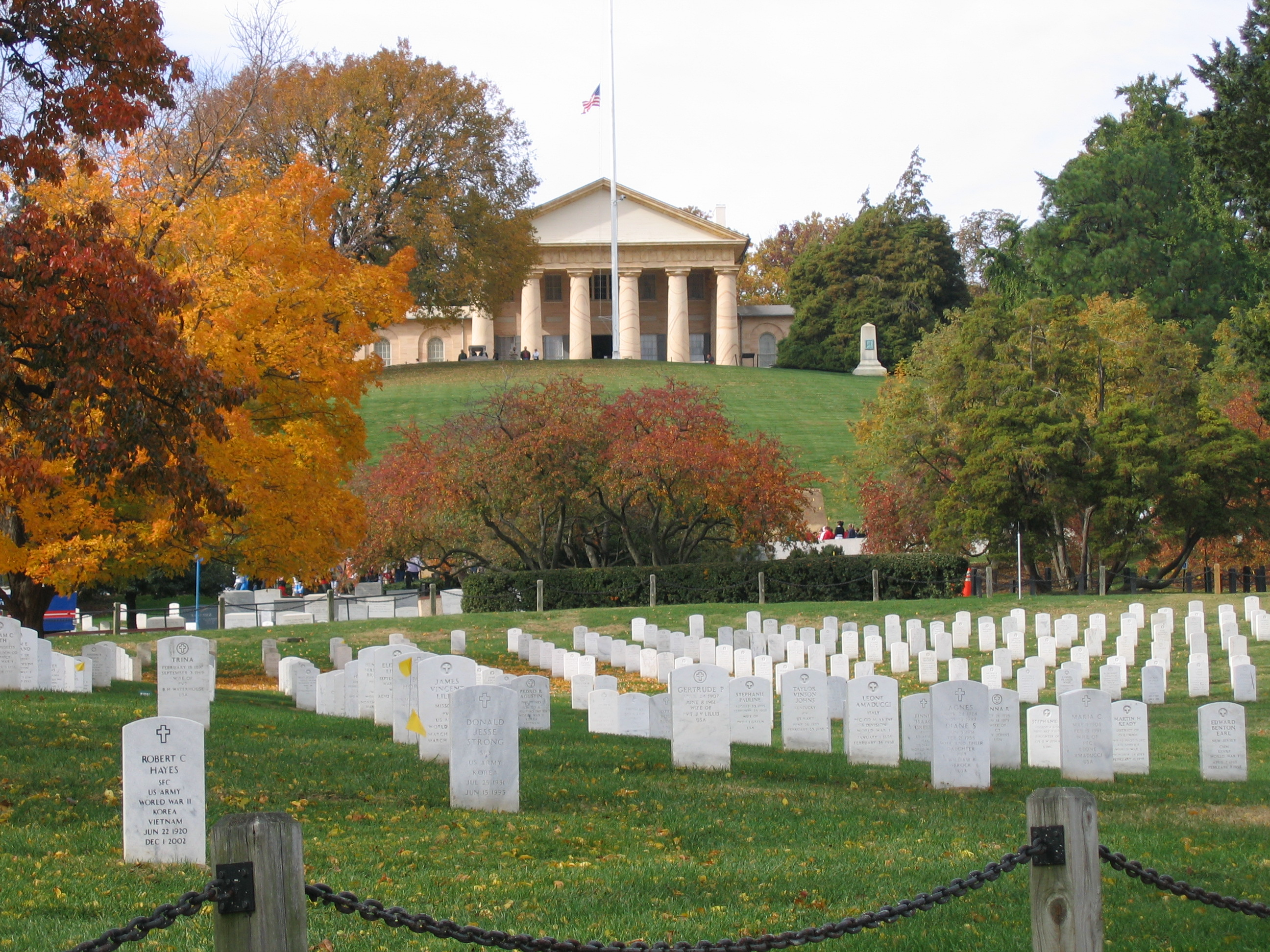
Arlington House in Arlington National Cemetery. Section 32 of the cemetery is in the foreground.

This article contains a list of battles with most United States military fatalities, in terms of American deaths.

== Introduction ==
This article lists battles and campaigns in which the number of U.S. soldiers killed was higher than 1,000. The battles and campaigns that reached that number of deaths in the field are so far limited to King William's War, the American Revolutionary War, the American Civil War, World War I, World War II, the Korean War, the Vietnam War, one operation during the War in Afghanistan (Operation Enduring Freedom) and one campaign during the Iraq War (the Anbar campaign from March 20, 2003 to December 7, 2011). The campaign that resulted in the most US military deaths was the Siegfried Line campaign (28 August 1944 to March 21, 1945) in which 50,410 soldiers were killed fighting against Nazi Germany. (Note: Between 15 September 1944 – 21 March 1945 only)

The bloodiest single day in the history of the United States military is either June 6, 1944, with 2,500 soldiers killed during the Invasion of Normandy on D-Day, or September 12, 1918, at the start of the Battle of Saint Mihiel, with over 2,500 dead (however, this exact figure is unverifiable because of poor documentation). The third-highest single-day toll was the Battle of Antietam, with 2,108 dead.

The deadliest single-day battle in American history, if all engaged armies are considered, is the Battle of Antietam with 3,675 killed, including both United States and Confederate soldiers (total casualties for both sides were 22,717 dead, wounded, or missing Union and Confederate soldiers September 17, 1862). (Note: Union and Confederate numbers added together)

The origins of the American soldier (and even some military units) can be traced back to the Provincial troops of British America while the origins of the modern U.S military can be traced back to the Americans' fight for independence from their former colonial power of Great Britain during the American Revolutionary War (1775–1783). The top three bloodiest conflicts in US military history so far have been American Civil War (1861–1865) (Over 1,000,000 dead), World War II (1941–1945 for declared American involvement) (420,000 dead) and World War I (1917-1918 for declared American involvement) (116,516 dead). Other significant conflicts involving the United States ordered by casualties include the War of 1812 (1812-1815) (15,000 dead), the Korean War (1950–1953) (36,574 dead), the Vietnam War (1965–1973 for American ground involvement) (58,281 dead), the War in Afghanistan (2001–2021) (2,325 US military dead and 3,917 US Military Contractors dead), the Iraq War (2003-2011) (4,508 US military dead and 3,650 US Military Contractors dead) and various other conflicts in the Middle East.

== Scope and definitions ==
The definition of "battle" as a concept in military science has varied with the changes in the organization, employment, and technology of military forces. Before the 20th century, "battle" usually meant a military clash over a small area, lasting a few days at most and often just one day—such as the Battle of Waterloo, which began and ended on 18 June 1815 on a field a few kilometers across.

Especially in 20th-century conflicts, "battle" has meant "military campaign"—larger and longer military operations, on the operational or even strategic level—such as the Battle of the Atlantic, fought for several years (1939–1945) over about a fifth of the Earth's surface.

Since both types of "battles" are not usefully comparable in many ways, including casualty comparisons, this article is divided into two sections, one for battle in the older, more restricted sense and one for campaigns, many of which are also called battles.

There are actions at the margins that can be reasonably assigned to either list. For instance, the Battle of Spotsylvania lasted 14 days, but the main part was fought on a small field (less than three kilometers on a side), and in this way being more in the nature of a siege (a military action typically of long duration but in covering a relatively small area). Like the similar Battle of Cold Harbor, also part of the Overland Campaign, it is included in this article on the Battles list. The Battle of Saint-Mihiel, lasting only about four days, but on a larger field (roughly 12 kilometers by 25 kilometers), is also included on the Battles list.

The term casualty in warfare can often be confusing. It often does not refer to those who are killed on the battlefield; rather, it refers to those who can no longer fight. That can include disabled by injuries, disabled by psychological trauma, captured, deserted, or missing. A casualty is only a soldier who is no longer available for the immediate battle or campaign, the major consideration in combat, and the number of casualties is simply the number of members of a unit who are not available for duty. For example, during the Seven Days Battles during the American Civil War (June 25 to July 1, 1862) there were 5,228 killed, 23,824 wounded and 7,007 missing or taken prisoners for a total of 36,059 casualties. The word casualty has been used in a military context since at least 1513. In this article the numbers killed refer to those killed in action, killed by disease, missing presumed dead, or someone who died from their wounds.

== Battles ==
Battle or siege	Conflict	Date	Estimated number killed	Opposing force	References
Battle of Bataan	World War II	January 7 to April 9, 1942	10,000 killed	(Empire of Japan) Japan	
Siege of Port Hudson	American Civil War	May 22 to July 9, 1863	5,707 killed (Note: Of the Union soldiers who died during the siege, 707 were killed in combat while 5,000 died from disease. On the Confederate side, 750 were killed or wounded in action while 250 died from disease.)	Confederate States of America	
Battle of Elsenborn Ridge (part of the Battle of the Bulge)	World War II	December 16 to 26, 1944	~5,000 killed	(Nazi Germany) Germany	
Battle of Saint-Mihiel	World War I	September 12 to 15, 1918	~4,500 killed	(German Empire) Germany	
Battle of Khe Sanh	Vietnam War	January 21 to July 9, 1968	3,500 killed (Note: Estimates range from 1,000 to 3,500 killed)	North Vietnam; Viet Cong (Laos) Pathet Lao	
Battle of Gettysburg	American Civil War	July 1 to July 3, 1863	3,155 killed (Note: 7,058 Americans (North & South))	Confederate States of America	
Battle of Saint-Lô	World War II	July 7 to 19, 1944	Over 3,000 killed	(Nazi Germany) Germany	
Operation Lüttich (Part of the Battle of Normandy)	World War II	August 7 to August 13, 1944	~3,000 killed (Note: Estimates range from 2,000 to 3,000 killed)	(Nazi Germany) Germany	
Battle of Monte Cassino	World War II	January 17 to May 18, 1944	~3,000 killed	(Nazi Germany) Germany; Italian Social Republic	
Battle of Leyte Gulf	World War II	October 23 to 25, 1944	2,800 killed	(Empire of Japan) Japan	
Battle of Cherbourg	World War II	June 6 to July 27, 1944	2,800 killed	(Nazi Germany) Germany	
Battle of Spotsylvania	American Civil War	May 8 to May 21, 1864	2,725 killed (Note: 2,725 Union and 1,515 Confederacy)	Confederate States of America	
D-Day (first day of Operation Overlord)	World War II	June 6, 1944	2,499 killed	(Nazi Germany) Germany	
Pearl Harbor Attack	World War II	December 7, 1941	2,335 killed (Note: 2,008 Navy KIA + 109 Marines + 218 Army (not included: 68 civilian deaths))	(Empire of Japan) Japan	
Battle of the Wilderness	American Civil War	May 5 to May 7, 1864	2,246 killed (Note: 2,246 Union and 1,495 Confederacy)	Confederate States of America	
Operation Thunderbolt (part of the Chinese Invasion of South Korea)	Korean War	January 25 to February 20, 1951	2,228 killed	China North Korea	
Battle of Peleliu	World War II	September 15 to November 25, 1944	2,143 killed (Note: 1,252–1,336 US Marines, 542–612 US Army, 195 US Navy, unknown US Army Air Force)	(Empire of Japan) Japan	
Battle of Antietam	American Civil War	September 17, 1862	2,108 killed (Note: 2,108 Union and 1,567 Confederate)	Confederate States of America	
Battle of Fismes and Fismette	World War I	August 3 to September 1, 1918	2,068 killed	(German Empire) Germany	
Battle of Aachen (part of the Battle of Hürtgen Forest)	World War II	October 12 to October 21, 1944	2,000 killed	(Nazi Germany) Germany	
Battle of Cold Harbor	American Civil War	May 21 to June 12, 1864	1,844 killed (Note: 1,844 Union and 788 Confederacy)	Confederate States of America	
Battle of Tarawa	World War II	November 20 to November 23, 1943	1,759 killed (Note: 984 Marines + 88 MIA + 687 Navy 984+ 88+ 687)	(Empire of Japan) Japan	
Battle of Shiloh	American Civil War	April 6 to April 7, 1862	1,754 killed (Note: 1,754 Union and 1,728 Confederacy)	Confederate States of America	
Second Battle of Bull Run	American Civil War	August 26 to August 30, 1862	1,747 killed (Note: 1,747 Union and 1,305 Confederacy)	Confederate States of America	
Seven Days Battles	American Civil War	June 25 to July 1, 1862	1,734 killed (Note: 1,734 Union and 3,494 Confederacy)	Confederate States of America	
Naval Battle of Guadalcanal	World War II	November 12, 1942 to November 15, 1942	1,732 killed	(Empire of Japan) Japan	
Battle of Stones River	American Civil War	December 31, 1862 to January 2, 1863	1,730 killed (Note: 1,730 Union and 1,294 Confederate)	Confederate States of America	
Second Battle of Petersburg	American Civil War	June 15 to June 18, 1864	1,688 killed (Note: 1,688 Union and 200 Confederate)	Confederate States of America	
Battle of Chickamauga	American Civil War	September 19 to September 20, 1863	1,656 killed (Note: 1,656 Union and 2,312 Confederate)	Confederate States of America	
Battle of Chancellorsville	American Civil War	April 30 to May 6, 1863	1,606 killed (Note: 1,606 Union and 1,724 Confederacy)	Confederate States of America	
UN Counteroffensive from the Pusan Perimeter (including the Inchon Landings and the Second Battle of Seoul)	Korean War	September 15 to September 30, 1950	1,492 killed	North Korea	
Task Force Faith	Korean War	November 27 to December 2, 1950	1,450~ killed (Note: Of the 2,500 soldiers in Task Force Faith only 1,050 made it back. Of those only 385 were able-bodied)	China	
Battle of Con Thien	Vietnam War	February 27, 1967 to February 28, 1969	1,419 killed	North Vietnam	
Second Battle of Naktong Bulge (part of the Battle of Pusan Perimeter)	Korean War	September 1 to September 15, 1950	1,305 killed	North Korea	
Battle of Fredericksburg	American Civil War	December 11 to December 15, 1862	1,284 killed (Note: 1,284 Union and 608 Confederacy)	Confederate States of America	
Battle of Quebec (1690)	King William's War	October 16 to 24, 1690	1,150 killed (Note: 150 during combat and 1,000 during the return voyage)	(Kingdom of France) France (New France) Colony of Canada	
Battle of Taejon	Korean War	July 14 to July 21, 1950	1,128 killed	North Korea	
Operation Avalanche	World War II	September 9 to 17, 1943	1,084 killed (Note: 788 from the US 5th Army and 296 from the US Navy)	(Nazi Germany) Germany	
Battle of Savo Island (part of the Guadalcanal Campaign)	World War II	August 8, 1942 to August 9, 1942	1,077 killed	(Empire of Japan) Japan	
Battle of Belleau Wood	World War I	June 1 to June 26, 1918	1,062 killed	(German Empire) Germany	
Battle of Masan (part of the Battle of Pusan Perimeter)	Korean War	August 5 to September 19, 1950	1,057 killed	North Korea	
Battle of Manila (part of the Battle of Luzon)	World War II	February 3 to March 3, 1945	1,010 killed	(Empire of Japan) Japan	
Battle of Gaines' Mill (part of the Seven Days Battles)	American Civil War	June 27, 1862	1,005 killed (Note: 1,005 Union and 1,483 Confederate)	Confederate States of America	

== Campaigns ==
Campaign	Conflict	Date	Estimated number killed	Opposing force	References
Siegfried Line campaign	World War II	August 28, 1944 to March 21, 1945	50,410 killed (Note: Between 15 September 1944 – 21 March 1945 only)	(Nazi Germany) Germany	
Italian campaign	World War II	July 9, 1943 to May 2, 1945	29,560 killed	(Nazi Germany) Germany; Italian Social Republic	
Battle of Normandy	World War II	June 6 to August 25, 1944	29,204 killed	(Nazi Germany) Germany	(Note: 20,668 among ground forces and 8,536 among the USAAF)
Defence of the Reich	World War II	January 27, 1943 to May 8, 1945 (Note: America joined the war in 1941 and joined the bombing offensive over Germany on January 27, 1943)	Over 27,000 killed	(Nazi Germany) Germany (Kingdom of Italy) Italy; Romania (Kingdom of Hungary) Hungary (Slovak Republic (1939–1945)) Slovakia	
Meuse–Argonne Offensive	World War I	September 26 to November 11, 1918	26,277 killed	(German Empire) Germany	
Philippines campaign (1944–1945)	World War II	October 20, 1944 to August 15, 1945	20,712 killed	(Empire of Japan) Japan	
Battle of the Bulge	World War II	December 16, 1944 to January 28, 1945	19,276 killed	(Nazi Germany) Germany	
Battle of the Atlantic	World War II	September 3, 1939 to May 8, 1945 (Note: The Battle of the Atlantic began on September 3, 1939. American involvement in the Battle of the Atlantic began on September 13, 1941.)	~18,000 killed	(Nazi Germany) Germany (Fascist Italy) Italy	
Central Europe Campaign	World War II	March 22 to May 8, 1945	15,009 killed	(Nazi Germany) Germany (Kingdom of Hungary) Hungary	
38th Parallel Static Warfare Campaign	Korean War	July 11, 1951 to July 27, 1953	~13,800 killed	China	
Philippines Campaign (1941-1942)	World War II	December 8, 1941 to May 6, 1942	~13,000 killed	(Empire of Japan) Japan	(Note: Hard to get exact numbers because post-World War II history books about the 1941-42 Philippines campaign focus mostly on the Bataan Death March and brutality in POW camps and don't give exact numbers on the KIA during the actual Battle of Bataan. Usually ~10,000 U.S. forces killed is given for the KIA in the actual Battle of Bataan. On Corregidor there were ~1,000 KIA. There were thousands more sailors and airmen killed in action during the 1941-42 Philippines Campaign on sunken U.S. Navy ships and hundreds of destroyed USAAF airplanes from December 1941 to May 1942.)
Battle of Okinawa	World War II	April 1 to June 22, 1945	~12,500 killed	(Empire of Japan) Japan	
Battle of Hürtgen Forest	World War II	September 19, 1944 to February 17, 1945	~12,000 killed	(Nazi Germany) Germany	(Note: 50,410 Americans died in the Rhineland from September 1944 - March 21, 1945)
Battle of Luzon	World War II	January 9 to August 15, 1945	10,310 killed	(Empire of Japan) Japan	
North Apennines Campaign	World War II	September 10, 1944 to April 4, 1945	8,486 killed	(Nazi Germany) Germany	
Mariana and Palau Islands campaign	World War II	June 1944 to November 1944	8,125 killed	(Empire of Japan) Japan	
Invasion of Lingayen Gulf	World War II	January 3 to 13, 1945	8,000 killed	(Empire of Japan) Japan	
Chinese Invasion of South Korea	Korean War	December 31, 1950 to July 10, 1951	~8,000 killed	China	
Overland Campaign	American Civil War	May 4 to June 24, 1864	7,621 killed (Note: 7,621 Union and 4,206-4,352 Confederacy)	Confederate States of America	
Operation Dragoon	World War II	August 15 to September 14, 1944	7,301 killed	(Nazi Germany) Germany	
Guadalcanal Campaign	World War II	August 7, 1942, to February 9, 1943	7,100 killed	(Empire of Japan) Japan	
Alsace Campaign	World War II	November 13, 1944 to February 19, 1945	7,000 killed	(Nazi Germany) Germany	
Battle of Iwo Jima	World War II	February 19 to March 26, 1945	6,821 killed	(Empire of Japan) Japan	
Lorraine Campaign	World War II	September 1 to December 18, 1944	6,657 killed	(Nazi Germany) Germany	
Naples–Foggia Campaign	World War II	September 9, 1943 to January 21, 1944	6,266 killed	(Nazi Germany) Germany	
Battle of Anzio	World War II	January 22 to June 5, 1944	5,538 killed	(Nazi Germany) Germany; Italian Social Republic	
Operation Kikusui	World War II	April 6 to June 22, 1945	4,907 killed	(Empire of Japan) Japan	
New Guinea campaign	World War II	January 23, 1942 to 15 August 1945	4,684 killed	(Empire of Japan) Japan	
Battle of Pusan Perimeter	Korean War	August 4 to September 18, 1950	4,599 killed	North Korea	
Chinese Second Phase Offensive in North Korea	Korean War	November 25 to December 15, 1950	4,538 killed (Note: U.S. Army KIA+Army POW died+Army MIA died+Marine KIA+Navy KIA 1183+1167+1410+763+15 = 4,538)	China	
Atlanta campaign	American Civil War	May 7 to September 2, 1864	4,423 killed (Note: 4,423 Union and 3,044 Confederate)	Confederate States of America	
Gettysburg campaign	American Civil War	June 3 to July 24, 1863	3,642 killed (Note: 3,642 Union and an unknown amount of Confederate)	Confederate States of America	
Chinese Spring Offensive and UN Counteroffensive (part of the Chinese Invasion of South Korea)	Korean War	April 22 to July 1, 1951	~3,600 killed	China; North Korea	
Battle of Leyte	World War II	October 17 to December 26, 1944	3,593 killed	(Empire of Japan) Japan	(Note: 16,233 died in Leyte, Luson, and Southern Philippines during October 17, 1944 - July 4, 1945)
Saar-Palatinate Offensive	World War II	March 8 to March 24, 1945	3,540 killed	(Nazi Germany) Germany	
Battle of Saipan	World War II	June 15 to July 9, 1944	3,426 killed	(Empire of Japan) Japan	
Peninsula campaign	American Civil War	March 8 to July 1, 1862	Over 3,311 killed	Confederate States of America	(Note: Union fatalities: 261 during the Battle of Hampton Roads (also known as the Battle of the Monitor and Merrimack and as the Battle of Ironclads), unknown during the Siege of Yorktown (1862), over 450 during the Battle of Williamsburg (also known as the Battle of Fort Magruder), unknown during the Battle of Eltham's Landing (also known as the Battle of Barhamsville), 14 during the Battle of Drewry's Bluff (also known as the Battle of Fort Darling), 62 at the Battle of Hanover Court House (also known as the Battle of Slash Church), 790 during the Battle of Seven Pines (also known as the Battle of Fair Oaks and as the Battle of Fair Oaks Station), and 1,734 during the Seven Days Battles (sometimes erroneously known as the Seven Days Campaign))
Tet Offensive	Vietnam War	January 30 to September 23, 1968	3,178 Killed	North Vietnam (Provisional Revolutionary Government of the Republic of South Vietnam) Viet Cong	(Note: 16,592 American died in 1968)
North Korean Invasion of South Korea	Korean War	June 25 to August 3, 1950	3,108 killed	North Korea	
Gilbert and Marshall Islands campaign	World War II	August 1942 to February 1944	3,070 killed (Note: 2,459 on the Gilbert Islands and 611 on the Marshall Islands)	(Empire of Japan) Japan	
Operation Northwind	World War II	January 1 to 25, 1945	3,000 killed	(Nazi Germany) Germany	
Battle of Chosin Reservoir	Korean War	November 27 to December 13, 1950	~2,840 killed (Note: 836 Marines killed + 2,000 US Army killed)	China	
Tunisian Campaign	World War II	November 12, 1942 to May 13, 1943	2,838 killed	(Nazi Germany) Germany (Fascist Italy) Italy	
Battle of Sicily	World War II	July 9 to August 17, 1943	2,811 killed	(Fascist Italy) Italy (Nazi Germany) Germany	
Maryland campaign	American Civil War	September 4 to 20, 1862	2,783 killed (Note: 2,783 Union and 3,812 Confederate)	Confederate States of America	
Operation Enduring Freedom	War in Afghanistan	October 7, 2001 to December 28, 2014	2,380 killed	Taliban al-Qaeda	
May Offensive	Vietnam War	April 29 to May 30, 1968	2,169 killed	North Vietnam (Provisional Revolutionary Government of the Republic of South Vietnam) Viet Cong	
Northern Virginia campaign	American Civil War	July 19 to September 1, 1862	2,061 killed (Note: 2,061 Union and 1,481 Confederate)	Confederate States of America	
Dutch East Indies Campaign	World War II	December 8, 1941 to March 9, 1942	~2,000 killed	(Empire of Japan) Japan	(Note: 10 U.S. Navy ships were sunk, resulting in 1,973 killed in action. 24 U.S. Army soldiers of the Lost Battalion were killed in action. Unknown number of USAAF airmen flying P-40 fighters were also killed during this campaign.)
Second Battle of the Marne	World War I	July 15 to August 6, 1918	1,926 killed (Note: 12,000 casualties including KIA, WIA, POW)	(German Empire) Germany	
Po Valley Offensive	World War II	April 5 to May 8, 1945	1,914 killed	(Nazi Germany) Germany	
Operation Toan Thang II	Vietnam War	June 1, 1968 to February 16, 1969	1,798 killed	North Vietnam (Provisional Revolutionary Government of the Republic of South Vietnam) Viet Cong	
Battle of Guam	World War II	July 21 to August 10, 1944	1,783 killed	(Empire of Japan) Japan	
UN Invasion of North Korea	Korean War	September 30 to November 25, 1950	1,732 killed	North Korea; China	
Operation Lumberjack	World War II	March 1 to 25, 1945	1,700 killed	(Nazi Germany) Germany	
Vicksburg campaign	American Civil War	December 29, 1862, to July 4, 1863	1,581 killed (Note: 1,581 Union and 1,413 Confederate)	Confederate States of America	
Operation Toan Thang III	Vietnam War	February 17 to October 31, 1969	1,533 killed	North Vietnam (Provisional Revolutionary Government of the Republic of South Vietnam) Viet Cong	
Ruhr pocket	World War II	April 1 to 18, 1945	~1,500 killed (Note: The losses of the US Fifteenth Army during the fighting in the Ruhr pocket are not listed in the official US history)	(Nazi Germany) Germany	
Battle of the Ch'ongch'on River	Korean War	November 25 to December 2, 1950	1,489 killed (Note: 676 killed + 813 Missing presumed dead)	China	
Anbar campaign	Iraq War	March 20, 2003 to December 7, 2011 (Note: The majority of the fighting and counterinsurgency campaign in Anbar took place between April 2004 and September 2007)	1,335 killed	Iraq (until 9 April 2003); Iraqi insurgency (2003–2011)	
Operation Grenade	World War II	February 23 to March 10, 1945	1,330 killed	(Nazi Germany) Germany	
Operation Grapeshot	World War II	April 6 to May 2, 1945	1,288 killed	(Nazi Germany) Germany; Italian Social Republic	
Chinese Fifth Phase Offensive	Korean War	April 22 to May 22, 1951	Over 1,200 killed	China; North Korea	
New Georgia campaign	World War II	June 30 to October 7, 1943	1,195 killed	(Empire of Japan) Japan	
New York and New Jersey campaign	American Revolutionary War	July 1776 to March 1777	~1,052 killed	(Kingdom of Great Britain) Great Britain (Loyalist (American Revolution)) Loyalists; Hesse; Waldeck	(Note: 300 killed in action and around 500 prisoners died of wounds, starvation, and smallpox during the Battle of Long Island, 50 killed during the Landing at Kip's Bay, 30 killed during the Battle of Harlem Heights, 8 killed during the Battle of Pell's Point, 3 killed during the Battle of Mamaroneck, around 50 killed during the Battle of White Plains, 59 killed during the Battle of Fort Washington, 2 from exposure during the Battle of Trenton, 6 killed during the Battle of the Assunpink Creek, and 44 killed during the Battle of Princeton. Unknown during the Battle of Iron Works Hill and the Battle of Millstone.)
Battle of Mindanao	World War II	March 10 to August 15, 1945	1,041 killed (Note: Operation VICTOR IV, the seizure of Mindanao's Zamboanga Peninsula occurred at the same time as Battle of Mindanao. 221 killed and 665 wounded on Zamboanga Peninsula 820 killed and 2,880 wounded on E. Mindanao)	(Empire of Japan) Japan	
Burma campaign	World War II	December 14, 1941 to September 13, 1945	1,021 killed	(Empire of Japan) Japan; Thailand	

== See also ==
- Deadliest single days of World War I
- List of battles with most Canadian military fatalities
- American units with the highest percentage of casualties per conflict

== Sources ==
- Alison (Jun 14, 2016). "The Count of Pearl Harbor Deaths". VisitPearlHarbor.org.
- Allen, Jonathan R. (2017). "How Many Died in the Civil War?". nellaware.com.
- Altobello, Brian (2000). Into the Shadows Furious. Presidio Press. ISBN 0-89141-717-6.
- Brown, Meredith Mason (2013). Touching America's History: From the Pequot War Through World War II. Indiana University Press. ISBN 978-0-2530-0833-6.
- Burke, Patrick; Roth, Jack (2014). Ghost Soldiers of Gettysburg: Searching for Spirits on America's Most Famous Battlefield. Llewellyn Worldwide. ISBN 978-0-7387-4135-2.
- Comptroller of the United States Army (1953). Army battle casualties and nonbattle deaths in World War II (PDF). Defense Technical Information Center. OCLC 220594130.
- Cawthorne, Nigel (2005). Victory in World War II. Arcturus Publishing. ISBN 1-84193-351-1.
- Corson, Captain William quoting Danny S. Parker's article 'War's Last Eruption' is Military History Magazine: Great Battles, September 1992, pp. 42–9. 3 (June 1995). Captured in Hatten: Captain William Corson's speech (Speech).
- Chant, Christopher (2016). "Operation Undertone". codenames.info.
- Daily, Edward L. (1999). MacArthur's X Corps in Korea: Inchon to the Yalu, 1950. Turner Publishing Company. ISBN 978-1-5631-1439-7.
- Dawson, Henry Barton (1886). Westchester County, New York in the American Revolution. Morrisania, New York: self-published. p. 259. "chatterton."
- D-Day Museum and Overlord Embroidery (2017). "D-Day and the Battle of Normandy: Your Questions Answered". D-Day Museum and Overlord Embroidery. Archived from the original on December 9, 2015.
- Ecker, Richard E. (2004). Battles of the Korean War: A Chronology, with Unit-by-Unit United States Casualty Figures & Medal of Honor Citations. McFarland & Company. ISBN 978-0-7864-1980-7.
- Ecker, Richard E. (2005). Korean Battle Chronology: Unit-by-unit United States Casualty Figures and Medal of Honor Citations. McFarland & Company. ISBN 978-0-7864-1980-7.
- Eicher, David J (2002). The Longest Night: A Military History of the Civil War. Simon and Schuster. ISBN 978-0-7432-1846-7.
- Fischer, David Hackett (2006). Washington's Crossing. Oxford University Press. ISBN 0-19-517034-2.
- Fisher, Ernest F. Jr. United States Army in WWII - the Mediterranean - Cassino to the Alps: [Illustrated Edition]. Pickle Partners.
- Graham, Roger D. (2007). The Nimrods. AuthorHouse. ISBN 978-1-4678-3096-6.
- Hart, B. H. Liddell (2015). A History of the Second World War. Pan Macmillan. ISBN 978-1-4472-0967-6.
- Hearn, Chester G. (2007). Marines: An Illustrated History : the U.S. Marine Corps from 1775 to the 21st Century. Zenith Press. ISBN 978-0-7603-3211-5.
- Hickman, Kennedy (April 28, 2017). "Korean War: Battle of Chosin Reservoir". Thoughtco.
- History.com (2017). "The Battle of Antietam". History.com.
- Jackson, W. G. F.; Gleave, T. P. (2004) [1988]. Butler, Sir James (ed.). The Mediterranean and Middle East: Part III - November 1944 to May 1945. History of the Second World War United Kingdom Military Series. Vol. VI (Naval & Military Press, Uckfield ed.). London: HMSO. ISBN 1-84574-072-6.
- Johnston, Henry P (1897). The Battle of Harlem Heights, September 16, 1776. London: The Macmillan Company.
- Kelly, Martin (April 4, 2017). "American Involvement in Wars from Colonial Times to the Present". Thoughtco.
- Ketchum, Richard (1999). The Winter Soldiers: The Battles for Trenton and Princeton. Holt Paperbacks; 1st Owl books ed edition. ISBN 0-8050-6098-7.
- Konstam, Angus (2007). Salerno 1943: The Allied Invasion of Italy. Pen and Sword. ISBN 978-1-8441-5517-0.
- Lengel, Edward (2005). General George Washington. New York: Random House Trade Paperbacks. ISBN 978-1-4000-6081-8.
- Lewis, Charles H. (2009). Cut Off: Colonel Jedediah Huntington's 17th Continental (Conn.) Regiment at the Battle of Long Island August 27, 1776. Westminster, MD: Heritage Books. ISBN 978-0-7884-4924-6.
- McCullough, David (2006). 1776. New York: Simon and Schuster Paperback. ISBN 0-7432-2672-0.
- MacDonald, Charles B. (1990) [1963]. The Siegfried Line Campaign. United States Army in World War II. Washington, D.C.: United States Army Center of Military History. CMH Pub 7-7-1. Archived from the original on 15 June 2010.
- MacDonald, C. B. (1973). Victory in Europe, 1945: The Last Offensive of World War II. United States Army in World War II European Theater of Operations. Washington DC: Office of the Chief of Military History, United States Army US Government Printing Office. OCLC 963582.
- Peckham, Howard H. (1974). The Toll of Independence: Engagements & Battle Casualties of the American Revolution. Chicago: University of Chicago Press. ISBN 0-226-65318-8.
- Peters, Brad & Jan Ross (2017). "History of the 300th Combat Engineers, 1943 to 1945: Germany". The WWII 300th Combat Engineers. Archived from the original on May 16, 2008.
- Ramirez, Fernando (August 9, 2017). "Historic WWII photos show gritty U.S. Marine struggle over Guam". Houston Chronicle.
- Sears, Stephen W. (2014). To the Gates of Richmond: The Peninsula Campaign. Houghton Mifflin Harcourt. ISBN 978-0-5475-2755-0.
- Smith, Larry (2009). Iwo Jima: World War II Veterans Remember the Greatest Battle of the Pacific. W. W. Norton & Company. ISBN 978-0-3932-8563-5.
- Smith, Robert Ross (2005). Triumph in the Philippines: The War in the Pacific. University Press of the Pacific. ISBN 978-1-4102-2495-8.
- Sondhaus, Lawrence (2011). World War One: The Global Revolution. Cambridge University Press. ISBN 978-1-1077-8250-1.
- Stamford Historical Society (2009). "The Stamford Historical Society Presents". Stamford Historical Society.
- Statistical and Accounting Branch, Office of the Adjutant General (1953). Army Battle Casualties and Nonbattle Deaths in World II: Final Report 7 December 1941 – 31 December 1946. Washington: Department of the Army. OCLC 4051205.
- Surgeon General (1920). "Report of the Office of the Surgeon General". War Department Annual Reports. 1920 (1): 1106.
- Traynor, John & Lisa Early, Clare Horrie (2017). "Background: Find out more about the events leading up to Truman's decision to drop the bomb". The National Archives (United Kingdom).
- Tucker, Spencer C. (2009). The Encyclopedia of the Spanish-American and Philippine-American Wars: A Political, Social, and Military History, Volume 1. ABC-CLIO. ISBN 978-1-8510-9951-1.
- Tucker, Spencer C. (2013). Almanac of American Military History, Volume 1. ABC-CLIO. ISBN 978-1-5988-4530-3.
- Tucker, Spencer C. (2014). Battles That Changed American History: 100 of the Greatest Victories and Defeats. ABC-CLIO. ISBN 978-1-4408-2862-1.
- United States, Government (2010). "Statistical information about casualties of the Vietnam War". National Archives and Records Administration. Archived from the original on 26 January 2010.
- U.S. War Department (1885). Reports, Mar 17 – Jun 25; Operations in Northern Virginia, West Virginia, and Maryland. Mar 17 – Sep 2, 1862. The War of the Rebellion: A Compilation of the Official Records of the Union and Confederate Armies. Vol. XII-XXIV-I. Washington, DC: U.S. Government Printing Office. hdl:2027/coo.31924077725921. OCLC 427057.
- United States War Department, John Sheldon Moody, Calvin Duvall Cowles, Frederick Crayton Ainsworth, Robert N. Scott, Henry Martyn Lazelle, George Breckenridge Davis, Leslie J. Perry, Joseph William Kirkley (1886). The war of the rebellion: a compilation of the official records of the Union and Confederate armies; Series 1 - Volume 16 (Part I). United States Government Publishing Office.
- Varhola, Michael O. (2000). Fire And Ice: The Korean War, 1950-53. Da Capo Press. ISBN 978-1-8828-1043-7.
- Willmott, H. P. (2005). The Battle of Leyte Gulf: The Last Fleet Action. Indiana University Press. ISBN 978-0-2530-0351-5.
- Zabecki, David T. Zabecki (1999). World War Two in Europe. Taylor & Francis. ISBN 978-0-8240-7029-8.
