= SS Linz =

Austro-Hungarian ocean liner, mined in 1918

Coordinates: 41°37′41″N 19°23′42″E

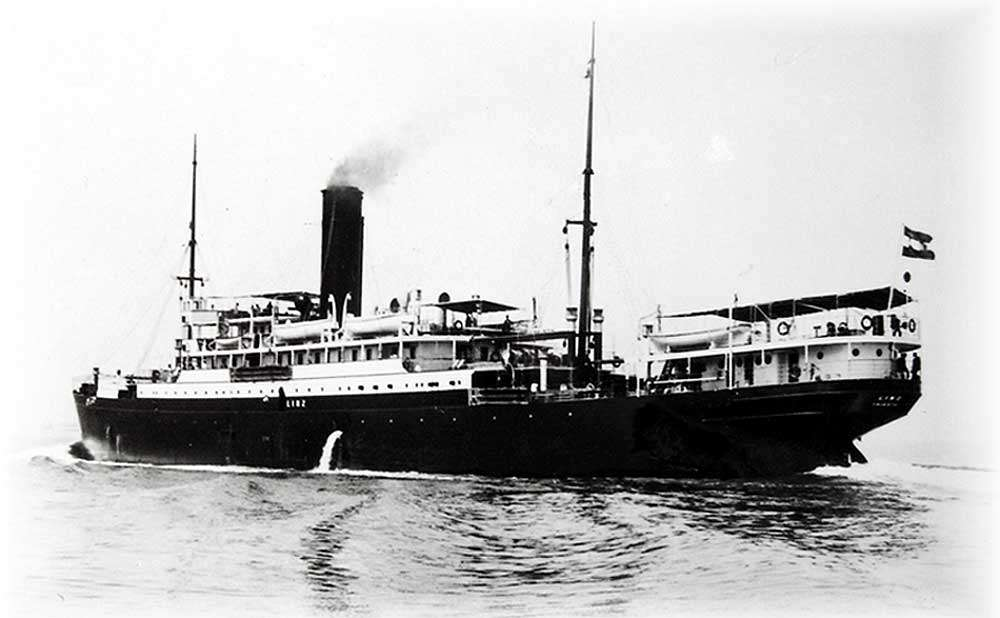
- Linz

History

Austria-Hungary
- Name: Linz
- Namesake: Linz
- Owner: Lloyd Austriaco
- Port of registry: Trieste
- Builder: Lloyd Austriaco
- Yard number: 116
- Launched: 20 April 1909
- Completed: July 1909
- Identification: code letters HLQK
- Fate: mined, 19 March 1918 (Note: Wrecksite.eu gives two dates 19 March 1918 and 20 February 1918)

General characteristics
- Type: ocean liner
- Tonnage: 3,819 GRT, 2,358 NRT
- Length: 344.5 feet (105.0 m)
- Beam: 45.5 feet (13.9 m)
- Depth: 25.9 feet (7.9 m)
- Decks: 1
- Installed power: 1 × triple-expansion engine, 395 NHP
- Propulsion: 1 × screw
- Speed: 12.5 knots (23 km/h)
- Capacity: 1,003 passengers and crew

SS Linz was an Austro-Hungarian ocean liner that hit a mine in the Adriatic Sea four miles northwest of the Cape of Rodon, while she was travelling from Fiume to Durazzo, Albania under command of Captain Tonello Hugo.

== Building ==
Linz was built in 1909 at the Lloyd Austriaco shipyard in Trieste. Her registered length was 344.5 feet (105.0 m), her beam was 45.5 feet (13.9 m), and her depth was 25.9 feet (7.9 m). Her tonnages were 3,819 GRT and 2,358 NRT. She had a single screw, driven by a three-cylinder triple-expansion engine. It was rated at 395 NHP, and gave her a speed of 12.5 knots (23 km/h).

== Loss ==
The Austro-Hungarian Navy requisitioned Linz, and used her to carry troops and prisoners on Albanian routes. She was sunk on 19 March 1918. (Note: Wrecksite.eu gives two dates 19 March 1918 and 20 February 1918) Linz was on a voyage from Fiume in what is now Croatia, to Durazzo in what is now Albania, escorted by three Austro-Hungarian Navy ships:: the Tátra-class destroyer SMS Balaton, and the torpedo boats SMS Tb-74 and SMS Tb-98. The ship officially had 1,003 passengers on board, of which 413 were Italian prisoners-of-war being transported to labour camps in Albania. After calling at the port of Zelenika, Linz hit a mine – although witnesses claimed to have seen a torpedo wake – at 00:25 hours and sank 20 minutes later, 4 nautical miles (7.4 kilometres) northwest of Cape Rodonit in the Adriatic Sea. A total of 697 passengers and crew died, including 283 Italian prisoners-of-war and an International Red Cross nurse. Balaton and the two torpedo boats saved 306 passengers and crew. An enemy submarine unsuccessfully attacked Tb-98.
