= Wounded in action =

Military term used for persons wounded by enemy action

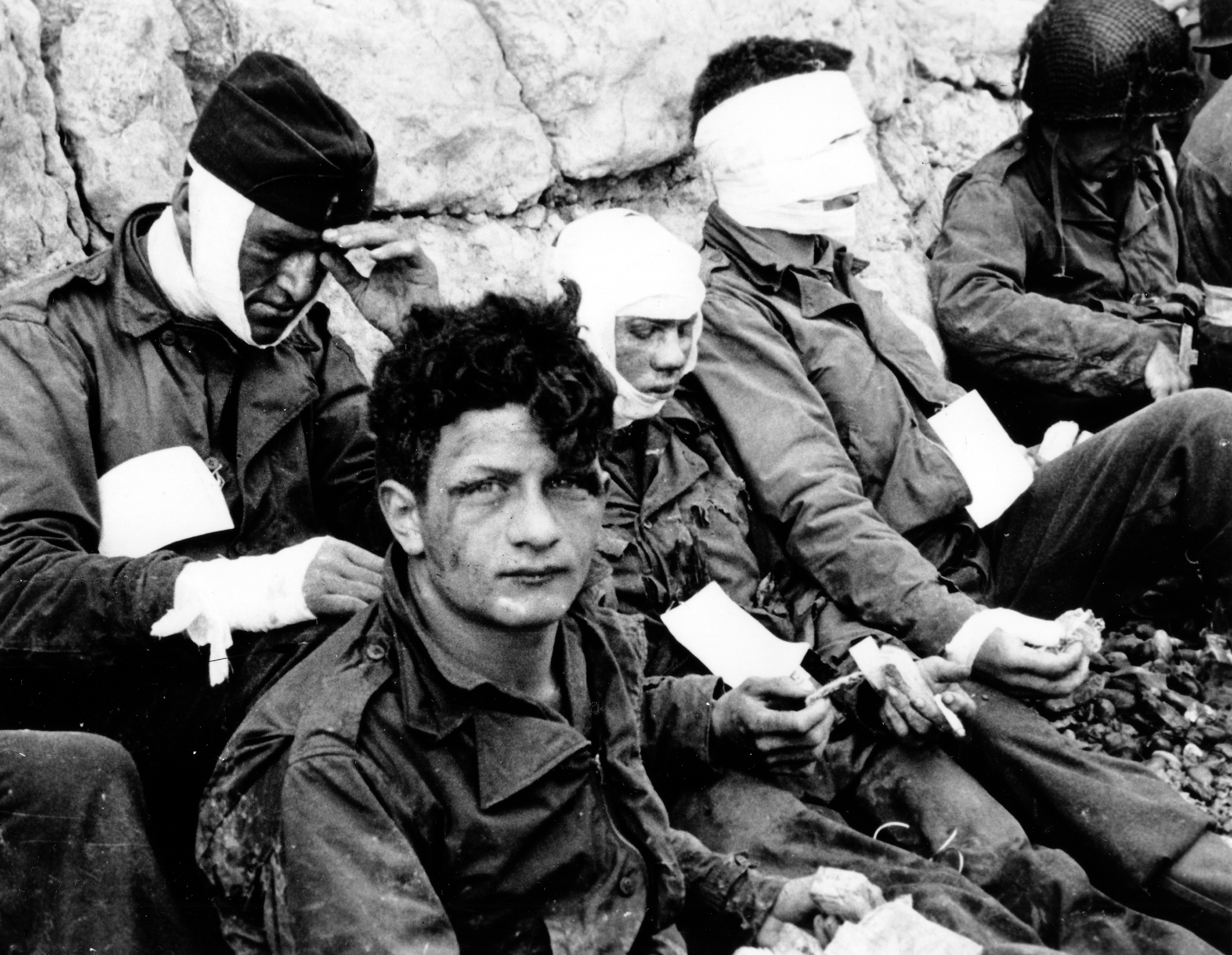
Wounded American soldiers on Omaha Beach, 1944

Wounded in action (WIA) describes combatants who have been wounded while fighting in a combat zone during wartime, but have not been killed. Typically, it implies that they are temporarily or permanently incapable of bearing arms or continuing to fight. Generally, the wounded in action are far more numerous than those killed. Common combat injuries include second and third-degree burns, broken bones, shrapnel wounds, brain injuries, spinal cord injuries, nerve damage, paralysis, loss of sight and hearing, post-traumatic stress disorder (PTSD), and limb loss.

For the U.S. military, becoming WIA generally results in subsequent conferral of the Purple Heart, because the purpose of the medal itself (one of the highest awards, military or civilian, officially given by the American government) is to recognize those killed, incapacitated, or wounded in battle.

== NATO's definitions ==
=== Wounded in action ===
A battle casualty other than killed in action who has incurred an injury due to an external agent or cause. The term encompasses all kinds of wounds and other injuries incurred in action, whether there is a piercing of the body, as in a penetrating or perforated wound, or none, as in the contused wound; all fractures, burns, blast concussions, all effects of biological and chemical warfare, the effects of exposure to ionizing radiation or any other destructive weapon or agent.

=== Died of wounds received in action ===
A battle casualty who later dies of wounds or other injuries received in action, after having reached a medical treatment facility. In the United States the acronym used is DOW, while NATO uses DWRIA.

== See also ==
- KIA – Killed in Action
- MIA – Missing in Action
- POW – Prisoner of War
- Casualty
