= Casualty (person) =

Military personnel unavailable for duty

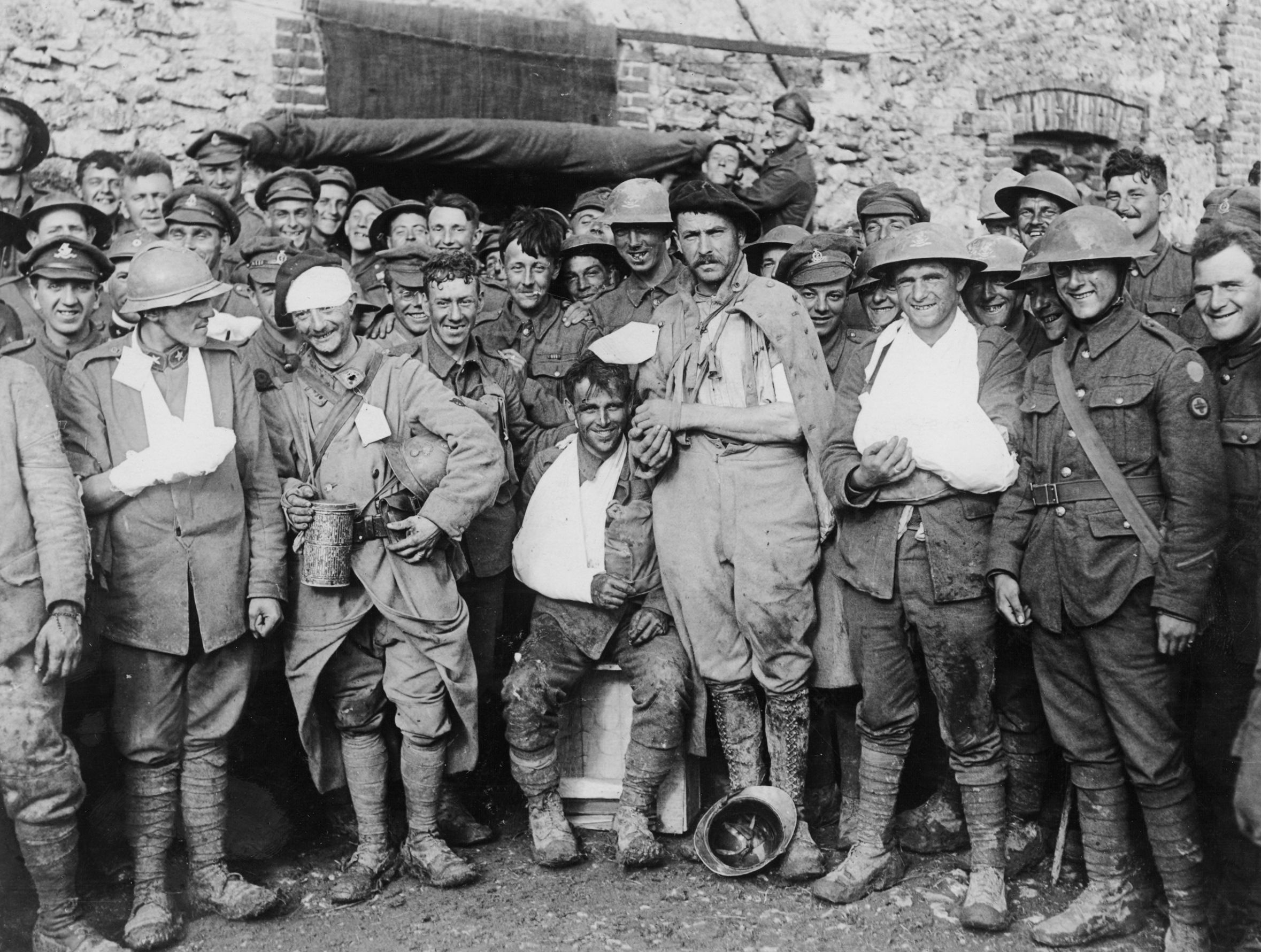
British, French and Italian casualties, many wearing slings or medical dressings, during the Second Battle of the Marne (1918). In spite of their injuries, most of them appear cheerful. To maintain morale at home, the government released propaganda photos such as these, showing that even injured troops remained positive and determined.

A casualty (/ˈkæʒuəlti/ KAZH-oo-əl-tee, UK also /ˈkæʒjuəlti/ KAZH-yoo-əl-tee), as a term in military usage, is a person in military service, combatant or non-combatant, who becomes unavailable for duty due to any of several circumstances, including death, injury, illness, missing, capture or desertion.

== Military usage ==
In military usage, a casualty is a person in service killed in action, killed by disease, diseased, disabled by injuries, disabled by psychological trauma, captured, deserted, or missing, but not someone who sustains injuries which do not prevent them from fighting. A casualty is any person lost to a unit through death, wounds, sickness, capture or desertion; the term is not synonymous with a fatality. Any casualty is no longer available for the immediate battle or campaign, the major consideration in combat; the number of casualties is simply the number of members of a unit who are not available for duty. The word has been used in a military context since at least 1513.

Civilian casualties are civilians killed or injured by military personnel or combatants, sometimes instead referred to by the euphemistic expression "collateral damage".

=== NATO definitions ===
The military organisation NATO uses the following definitions:

==== Casualty ====
In relation to personnel, any person who is lost to his organization by reason of being declared dead, wounded, diseased, detained, captured or missing.

==== Battle casualty ====
Any casualty incurred as the direct result of hostile action, sustained in combat or relating thereto, or sustained going to or returning from a combat mission.

==== Non-battle casualty ====
A person who is not a battle casualty, but who is lost to his organization by reason of disease or injury, including persons dying from disease or injury, or by reason of being missing where the absence does not appear to be voluntary or due to enemy action or to being interned.

=== Other definitions ===
These definitions are popular among military historians.

==== Irrecoverable casualty ====
In relation to personnel, any person killed in action, missing in action or who died of wounds or diseases before being evacuated to a medical installation.

==== Medical casualty ====
In relation to personnel, any person incapacitated by wounds sustained or diseases contracted in a combat zone, as well as any person admitted to a medical installation for treatment or recuperation for more than a day. There is a distinction between combat medical casualty and non-combat medical casualty. The former refers to a medical casualty that is a direct result of combat action; the latter refers to a medical casualty that is not a direct result of combat action.

==== Civilian casualties ====
A civilian casualty refers to a civilian that is killed or wounded as a direct result of military action.

==== Killed in action ====
A casualty classification generally used to describe any person killed by means of the action of hostile forces.

==== Missing in action ====
A casualty classification generally used to describe any person reported missing during combat operations. They may have deserted, or may have been killed, wounded, or taken prisoner.

==== Wounded in action ====
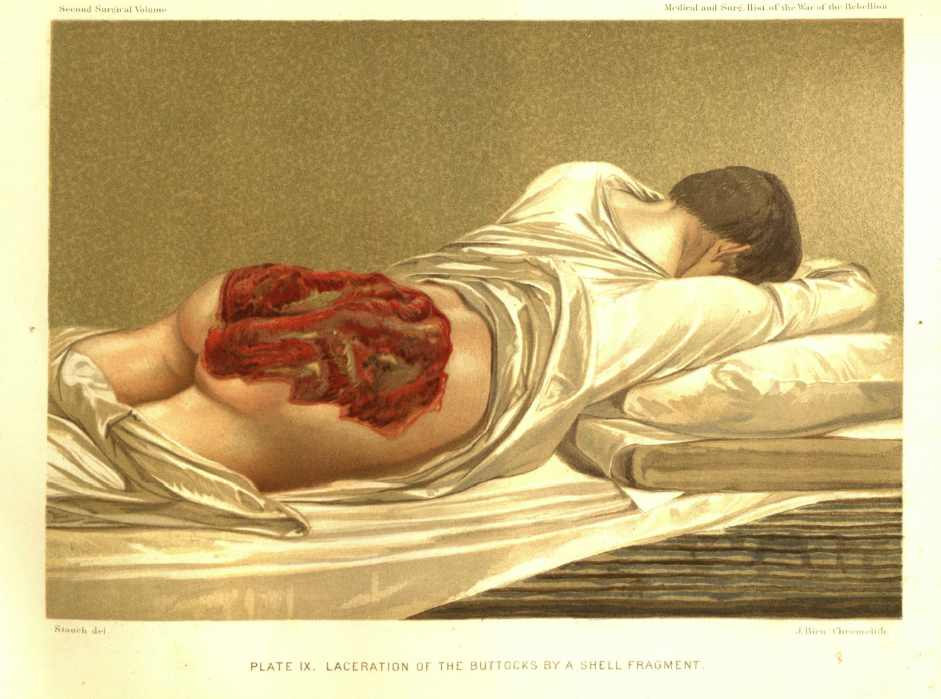
Shell fragment injury, American Civil War

A casualty classification generally used to describe any person who has incurred an injury by means of action of hostile forces.

==== Prisoner of war ====
A casualty classification generally used to describe any person captured and held in custody by hostile forces.

== Civilian usage ==
The word "casualty" has been used since 1844 in civilian life. In civilian usage, a casualty is a person who is killed, wounded or incapacitated by some event; the term is usually used to describe multiple deaths and injuries due to violent incidents or disasters. It is sometimes misunderstood to mean "fatalities", but non-fatal injuries are also casualties.

== Incidence ==
=== Military and civilian fatalities ===
According to WHO World Health Report 2004, deaths from intentional injuries (including war, violence, and suicide) were estimated to be 2.8% of all deaths. In the same report, unintentional injury was estimated to be responsible for 6.2% of all deaths.

== See also ==
- List of causes of death by rate
