= Pagoda (Sri Jayawardanapura Kotte) Grama Niladhari Division =

Pagoda
- Grama Niladhari Division
- Interactive map of Pagoda
- Coordinates: 6.880655°N 79.896714°E
- Country: Sri Lanka
- Province: Western Province
- District: Colombo District
- Divisional Secretariat: Sri Jayawardanapura Kotte Divisional Secretariat
- Electoral District: Colombo Electoral District
- Polling Division: Kotte Polling Division

Area
  - Total: 0.9 km^{2} (0.35 sq mi)
- Elevation: 36 m (118 ft)

Population (2012)
  - Total: 5,446
  - Density: 6,051/km^{2} (15,670/sq mi)
- ISO 3166 code: LK-1124075

Pagoda

Pagoda Grama Niladhari Division is a Grama Niladhari Division of the Sri Jayawardanapura Kotte Divisional Secretariat of Colombo District of Western Province, Sri Lanka. It has Grama Niladhari Division Code 519A.

Ananda Balika Vidyalaya, Kotte, Yachting Association of Sri Lanka, Ananda Sastralaya, Kotte, Jubilee Post, Nugegoda, Pita Kotte Gal Ambalama and Kotte Raja Maha Vihara are located within, nearby or associated with Pagoda.

Pagoda is a surrounded by the Pitakotte West, Nawala East, Nugegoda, Nugegoda West and Pagoda East Grama Niladhari Divisions.

== Demographics ==
=== Ethnicity ===
The Pagoda Grama Niladhari Division has a Sinhalese majority (91.3%). In comparison, the Sri Jayawardanapura Kotte Divisional Secretariat (which contains the Pagoda Grama Niladhari Division) has a Sinhalese majority (84.8%)

Ethnicity in Pagoda
1. Sinhalese (91.3%)
2. Sri Lankan Tamil (2.60%)
3. Moor (2.30%)
4. Burgher (2.10%)
5. Other (1.70%)

=== Religion ===
The Pagoda Grama Niladhari Division has a Buddhist majority (81.4%). In comparison, the Sri Jayawardanapura Kotte Divisional Secretariat (which contains the Pagoda Grama Niladhari Division) has a Buddhist majority (77.1%)

Religion in Pagoda
1. Buddhist (81.4%)
2. Roman Catholic (8.40%)
3. Other Christian (4.90%)
4. Muslim (3.10%)
5. Hindu (2.10%)
6. Other (0.10%)

== Gallery ==
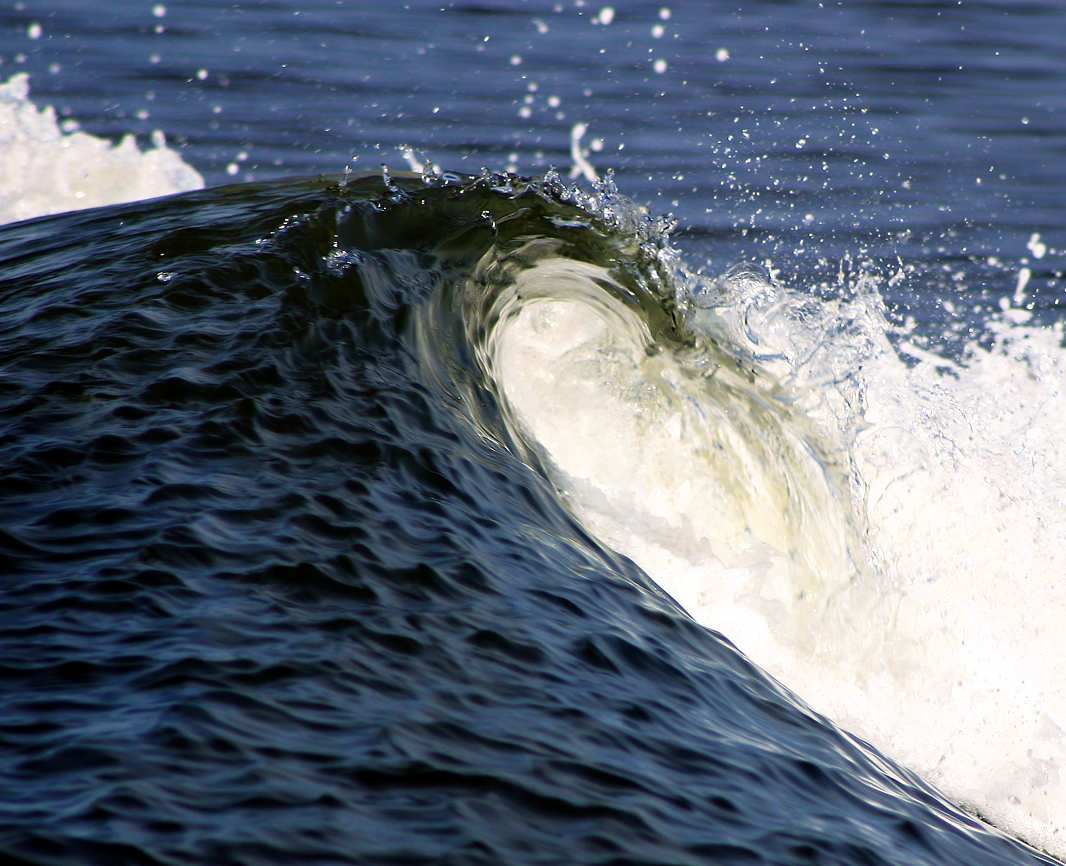
Yachting Association of Sri Lanka

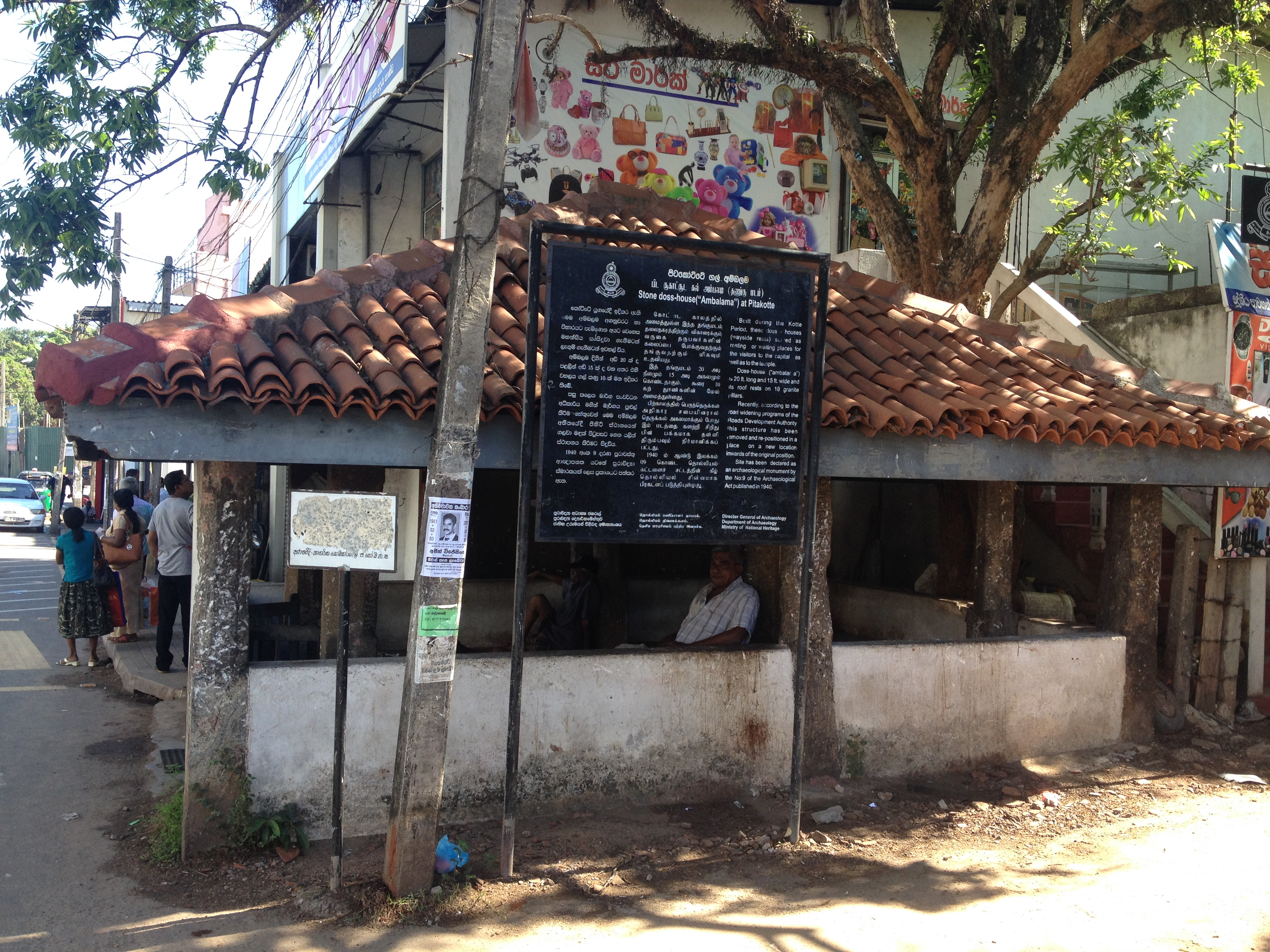
Pita Kotte Gal Ambalama

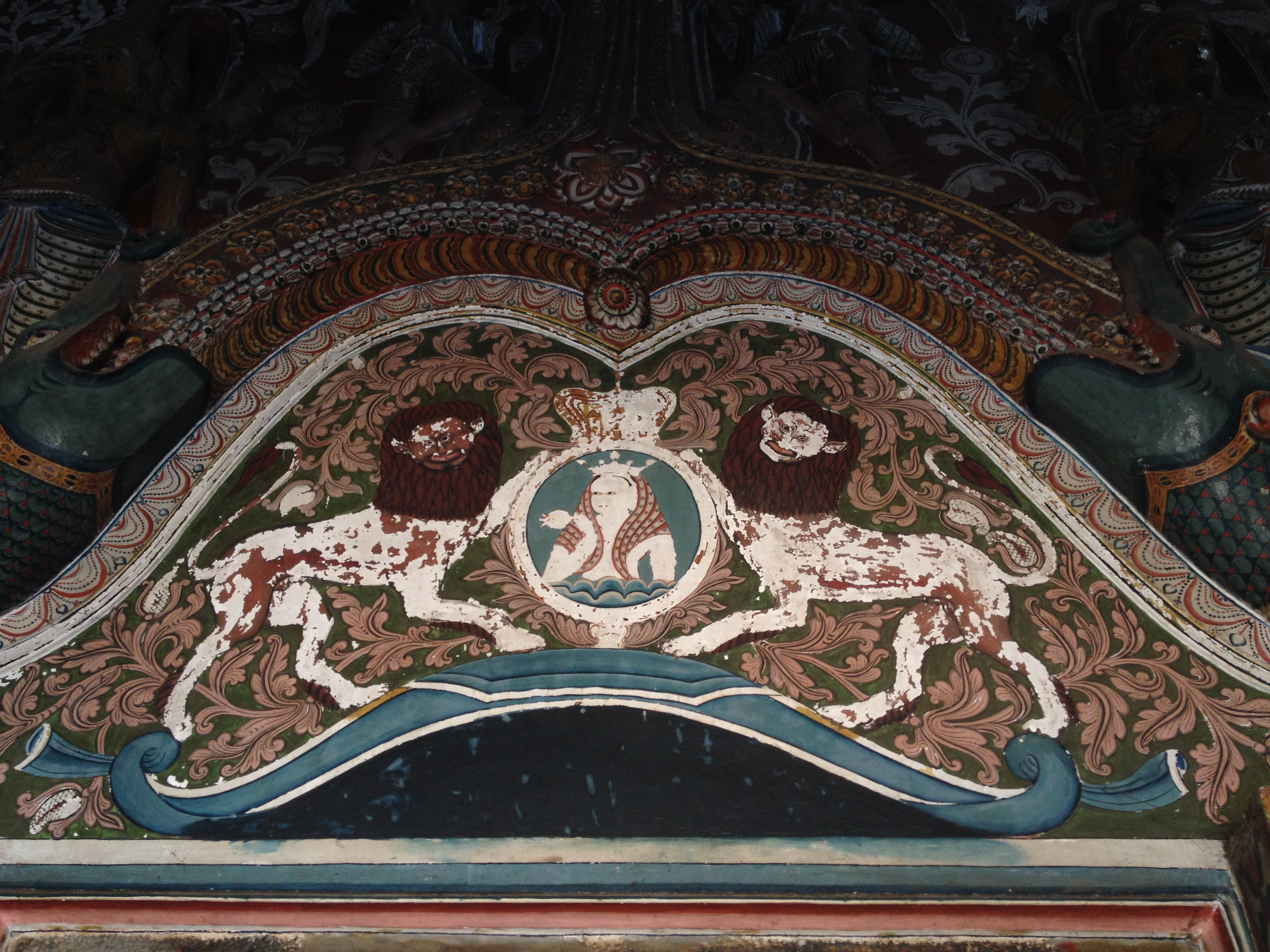
Kotte Raja Maha Vihara
