= Nugegoda Grama Niladhari Division =

Nugegoda
- Grama Niladhari Division
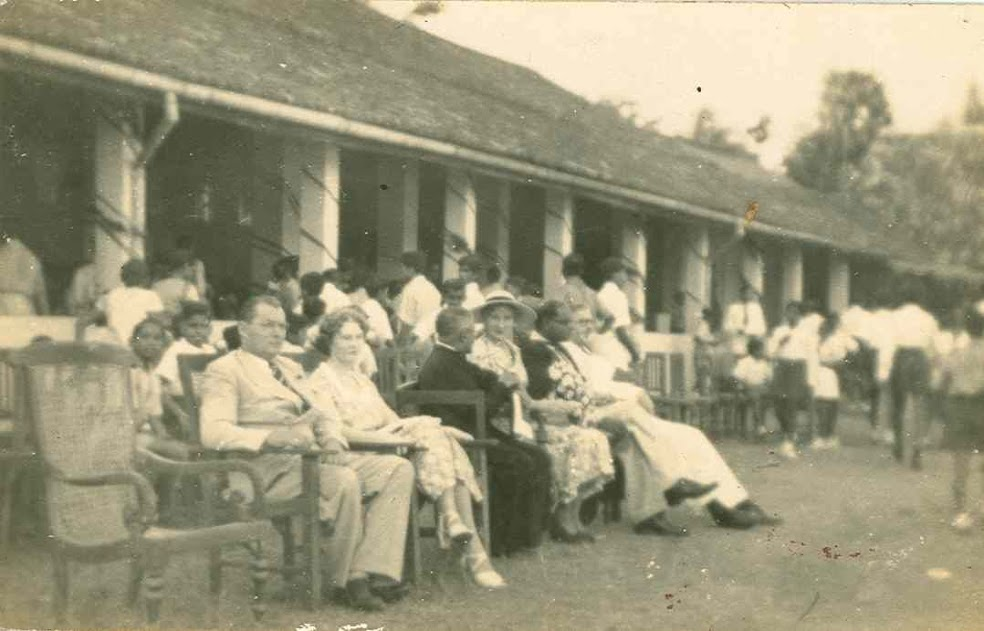
- Samudradevi Balika Vidyalaya is located within, nearby or associated with the Nugegoda Grama Niladhari Division
- Interactive map of Nugegoda
- Coordinates: 6.874877°N 79.893742°E
- Country: Sri Lanka
- Province: Western Province
- District: Colombo District
- Divisional Secretariat: Sri Jayawardanapura Kotte Divisional Secretariat
- Electoral District: Colombo Electoral District
- Polling Division: Kotte Polling Division

Area
  - Total: 0.6 km^{2} (0.23 sq mi)
- Elevation: 14 m (46 ft)

Population (2012)
  - Total: 3,365
  - Density: 5,608/km^{2} (14,520/sq mi)
- ISO 3166 code: LK-1124080

Nugegoda

Nugegoda Grama Niladhari Division is a Grama Niladhari Division of the Sri Jayawardanapura Kotte Divisional Secretariat of Colombo District of Western Province, Sri Lanka. It has Grama Niladhari Division Code 519.

St. Joseph's Boys' College, Nugegoda, Yachting Association of Sri Lanka, Samudradevi Balika Vidyalaya and Jubilee Post, Nugegoda are located within, nearby or associated with Nugegoda.

Nugegoda is a surrounded by the Dutugemunu, Kohuwala, Gangodavila North, Pagoda East, Nugegoda West and Pagoda Grama Niladhari Divisions.

== Demographics ==
=== Ethnicity ===
The Nugegoda Grama Niladhari Division has a Sinhalese majority (88.9%). In comparison, the Sri Jayawardanapura Kotte Divisional Secretariat (which contains the Nugegoda Grama Niladhari Division) has a Sinhalese majority (84.8%).

Ethnicity in Nugegoda
1. Sinhalese (88.9%)
2. Sri Lankan Tamil (6.50%)
3. Other (3.10%)
4. Moor (1.50%)

=== Religion ===
The Nugegoda Grama Niladhari Division has a Buddhist majority (81.2%). In comparison, the Sri Jayawardanapura Kotte Divisional Secretariat (which contains the Nugegoda Grama Niladhari Division) has a Buddhist majority (77.1%)

Religion in Nugegoda
1. Buddhist (81.2%)
2. Roman Catholic (6.30%)
3. Other Christian (4.90%)
4. Hindu (4.80%)
5. Muslim (2.50%)
6. Other (0.30%)

== Gallery ==
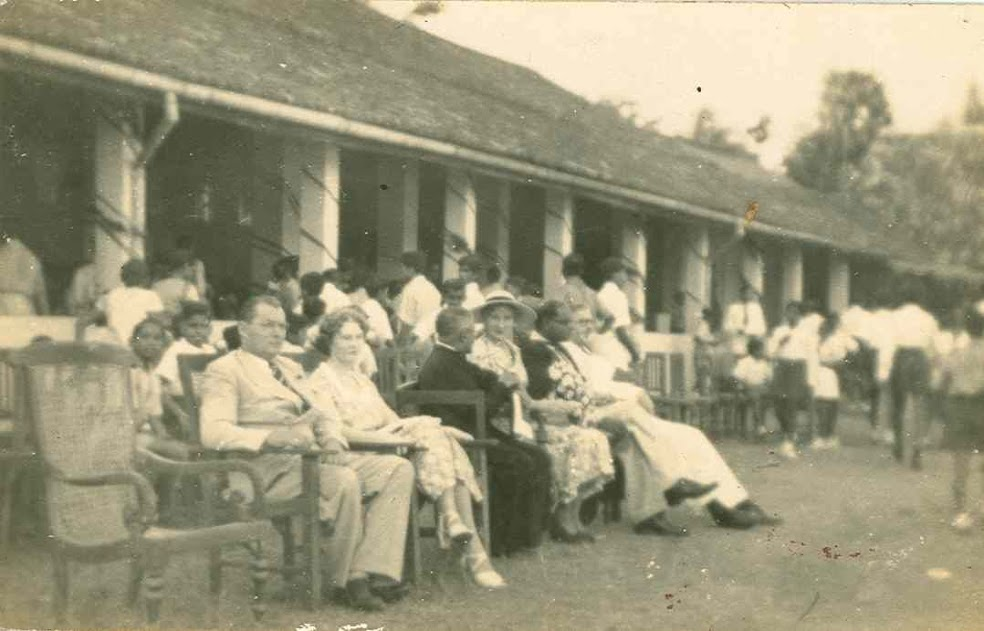
Samudradevi Balika Vidyalaya
