= Gangodavila North Grama Niladhari Division =

Gangodavila North
- Grama Niladhari Division
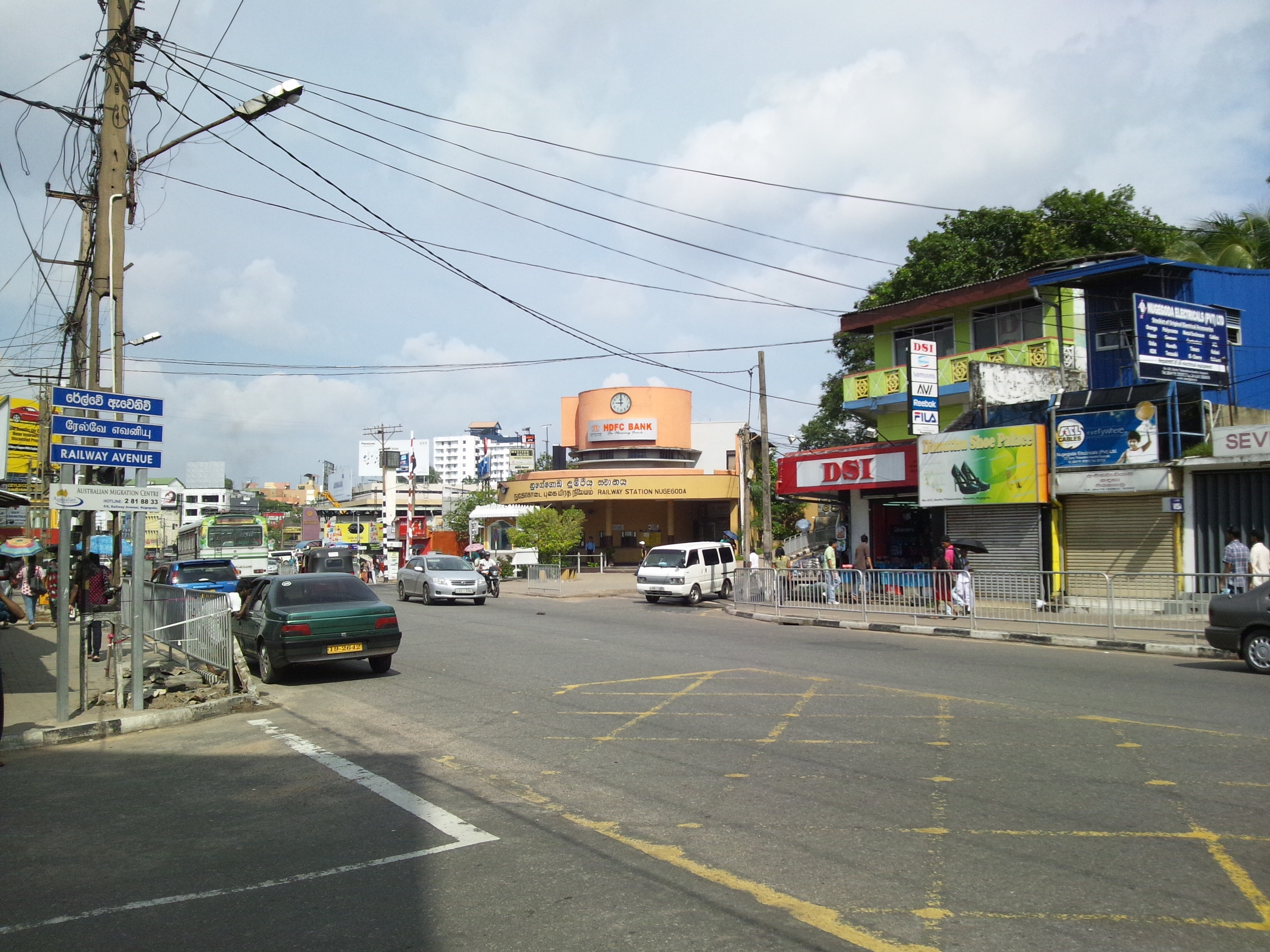
- Nugegoda is located within, nearby or associated with the Gangodavila North Grama Niladhari Division
- Interactive map of Gangodavila North
- Coordinates: 6.867518°N 79.896705°E
- Country: Sri Lanka
- Province: Western Province
- District: Colombo District
- Divisional Secretariat: Sri Jayawardanapura Kotte Divisional Secretariat
- Electoral District: Colombo Electoral District
- Polling Division: Kotte Polling Division

Area
  - Total: 0.6 km^{2} (0.23 sq mi)
- Elevation: 32 m (105 ft)

Population (2012)
  - Total: 5,352
  - Density: 8,920/km^{2} (23,100/sq mi)
- ISO 3166 code: LK-1124090

Gangodavila North

Gangodavila North Grama Niladhari Division is a Grama Niladhari Division of the Sri Jayawardanapura Kotte Divisional Secretariat of Colombo District of Western Province, Sri Lanka. It has Grama Niladhari Division Code 526.

Nugegoda, Samudradevi Balika Vidyalaya and St. Joseph's Boys' College, Nugegoda are located within, nearby or associated with Gangodavila North.

Gangodavila North is a surrounded by the Kohuwala, Jambugasmulla, Gangodavila South, Gangodavila South B, Nugegoda and Pagoda East Grama Niladhari Divisions.

== Demographics ==
=== Ethnicity ===
The Gangodavila North Grama Niladhari Division has a Sinhalese majority (87.5%). In comparison, the Sri Jayawardanapura Kotte Divisional Secretariat (which contains the Gangodavila North Grama Niladhari Division) has a Sinhalese majority (84.8%)

Ethnicity in Gangodavila North
1. Sinhalese (87.5%)
2. Sri Lankan Tamil (5.90%)
3. Moor (2.80%)
4. Burgher (1.40%)
5. Malay (1.30%)
6. Other (1.10%)

=== Religion ===
The Gangodavila North Grama Niladhari Division has a Buddhist majority (80.3%). In comparison, the Sri Jayawardanapura Kotte Divisional Secretariat (which contains the Gangodavila North Grama Niladhari Division) has a Buddhist majority (77.1%)

Religion in Gangodavila North
1. Buddhist (80.3%)
2. Roman Catholic (6.30%)
3. Muslim (4.50%)
4. Hindu (4.40%)
5. Other Christian (4.30%)
6. Other (0.20%)

== Gallery ==
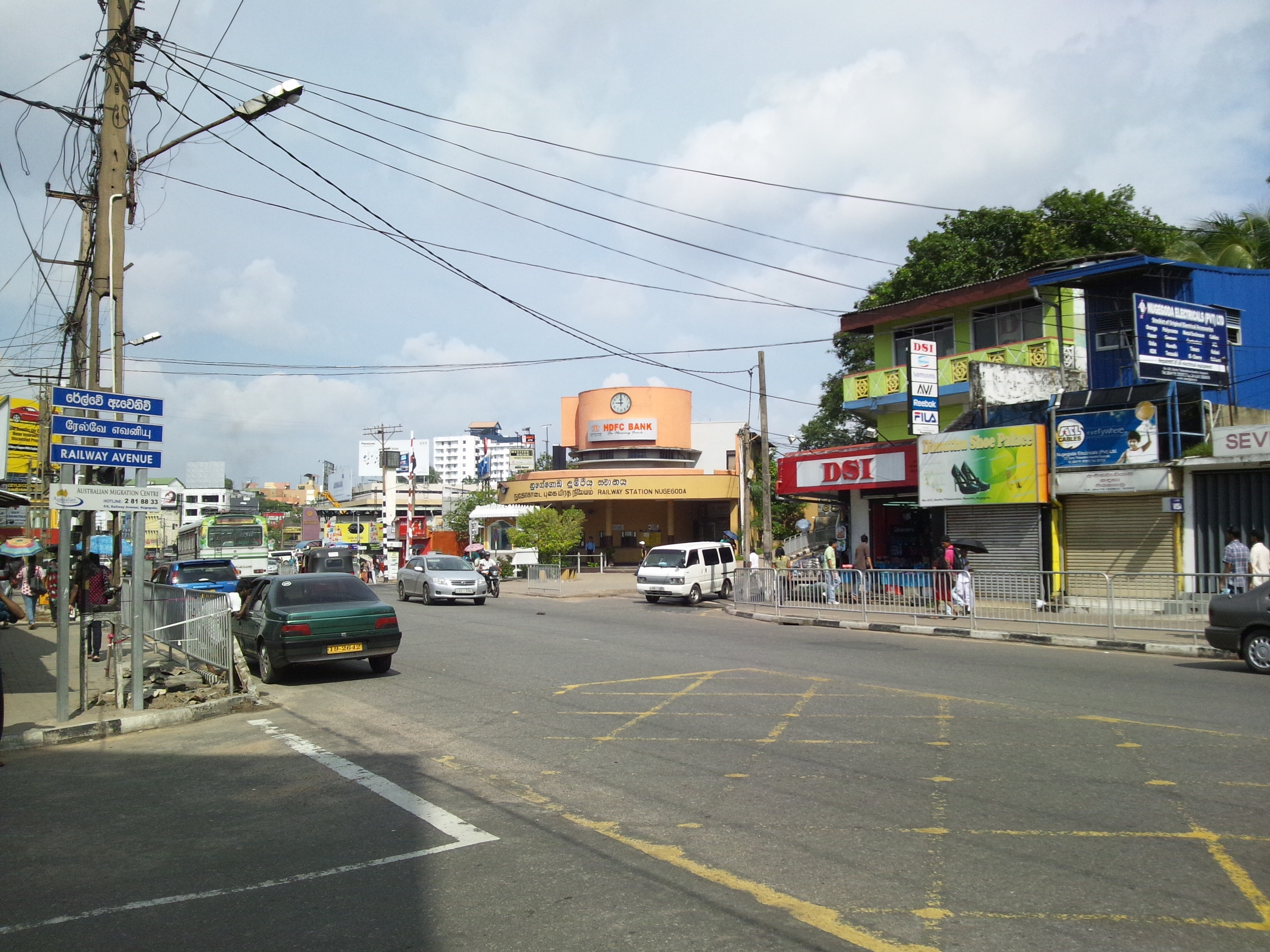
Nugegoda

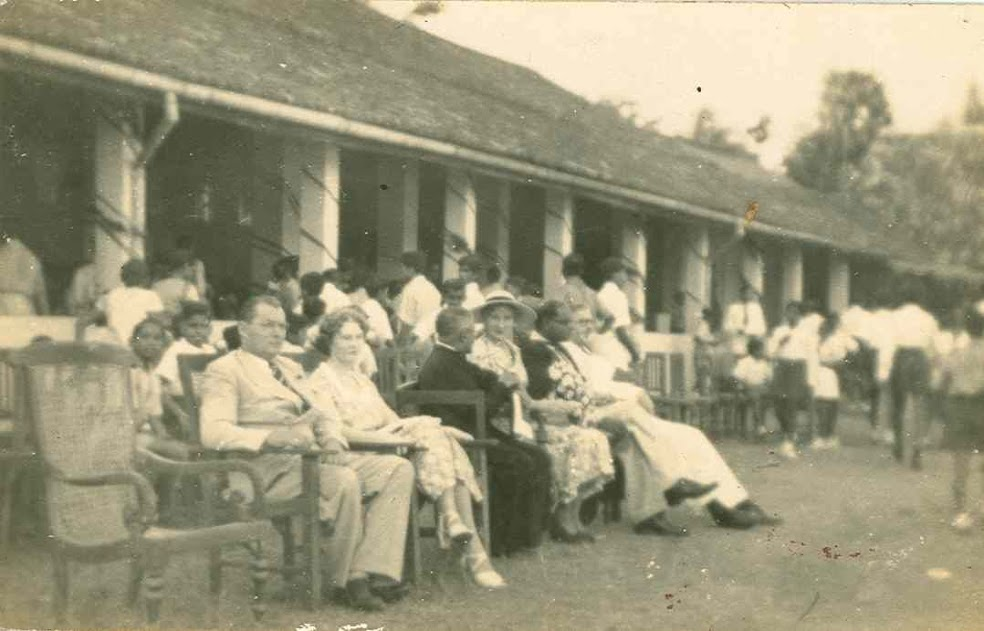
Samudradevi Balika Vidyalaya
