= Mirihana South Grama Niladhari Division =

Mirihana South
- Grama Niladhari Division
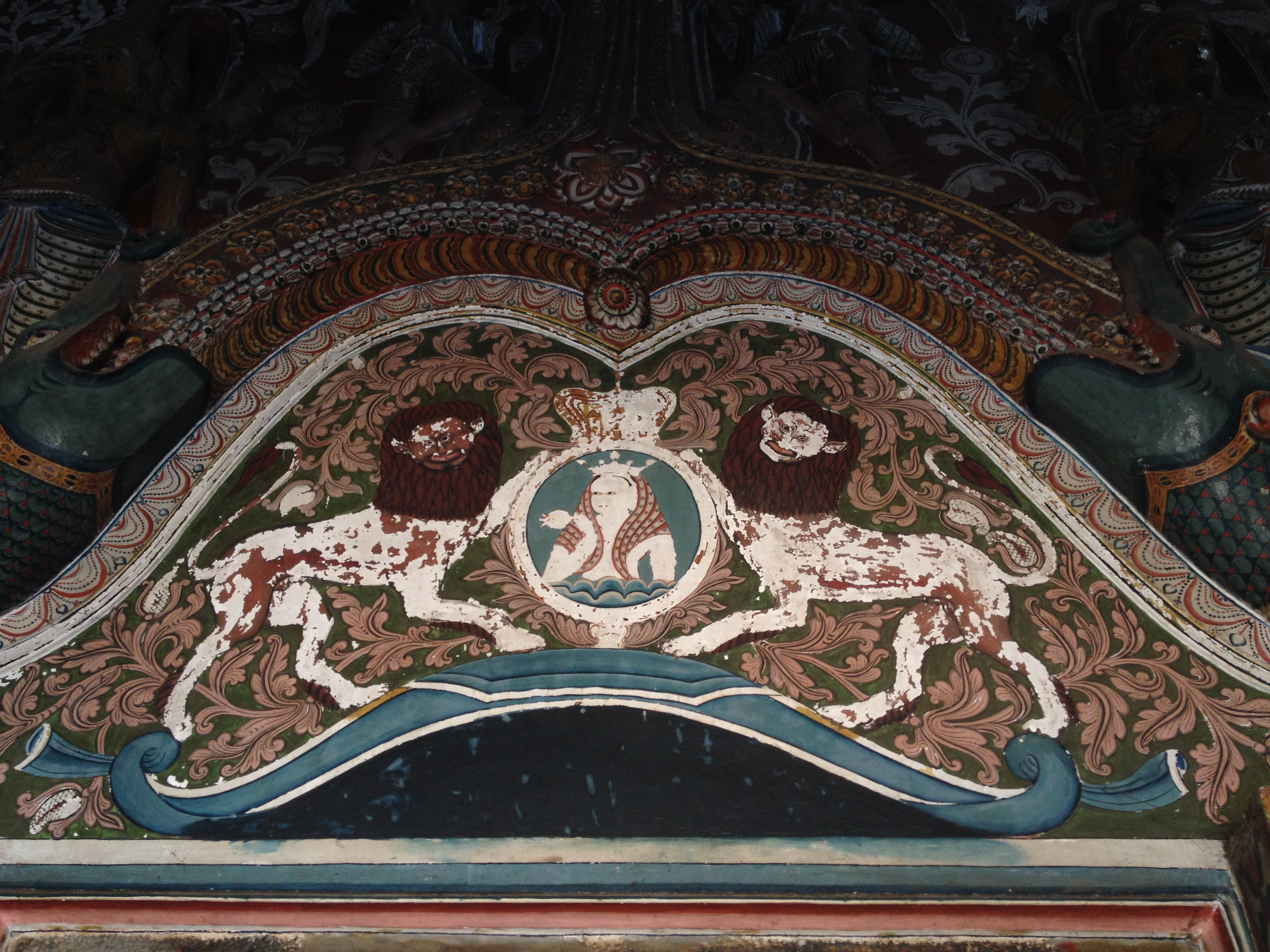
- Kotte Raja Maha Vihara is located within, nearby or associated with the Mirihana South Grama Niladhari Division
- Interactive map of Mirihana South
- Coordinates: 6.876254°N 79.905090°E
- Country: Sri Lanka
- Province: Western Province
- District: Colombo District
- Divisional Secretariat: Maharagama Divisional Secretariat
- Electoral District: Colombo Electoral District
- Polling Division: Maharagama Polling Division

Area
  - Total: 0.61 km^{2} (0.24 sq mi)
- Elevation: 7 m (23 ft)

Population (2012)
  - Total: 6,043
  - Density: 9,907/km^{2} (25,660/sq mi)
- ISO 3166 code: LK-1121005

Mirihana South

Mirihana South Grama Niladhari Division is a Grama Niladhari Division of the Maharagama Divisional Secretariat of Colombo District of Western Province, Sri Lanka . It has Grama Niladhari Division Code 523A.

Jubilee Post, Nugegoda, Kotte Raja Maha Vihara, Ananda Sastralaya, Kotte and Pita Kotte Gal Ambalama are located within, nearby or associated with Mirihana South.

Mirihana South is a surrounded by the Mirihana North, Udahamulla East, Udahamulla West, Gangodavila East, Pagoda East and Pitakotte Grama Niladhari Divisions.

== Demographics ==
=== Ethnicity ===
The Mirihana South Grama Niladhari Division has a Sinhalese majority (91.5%) . In comparison, the Maharagama Divisional Secretariat (which contains the Mirihana South Grama Niladhari Division) has a Sinhalese majority (95.7%)

Ethnicity in Mirihana South
1. Sinhalese (91.5%)
2. Sri Lankan Tamil (4.00%)
3. Burgher (2.70%)
4. Other (1.70%)

=== Religion ===
The Mirihana South Grama Niladhari Division has a Buddhist majority (84.9%) . In comparison, the Maharagama Divisional Secretariat (which contains the Mirihana South Grama Niladhari Division) has a Buddhist majority (92.0%)

Religion in Mirihana South
1. Buddhist (84.9%)
2. Roman Catholic (6.70%)
3. Other Christian (4.60%)
4. Hindu (2.30%)
5. Muslim (1.40%)
6. Other (0.00%)

== Gallery ==
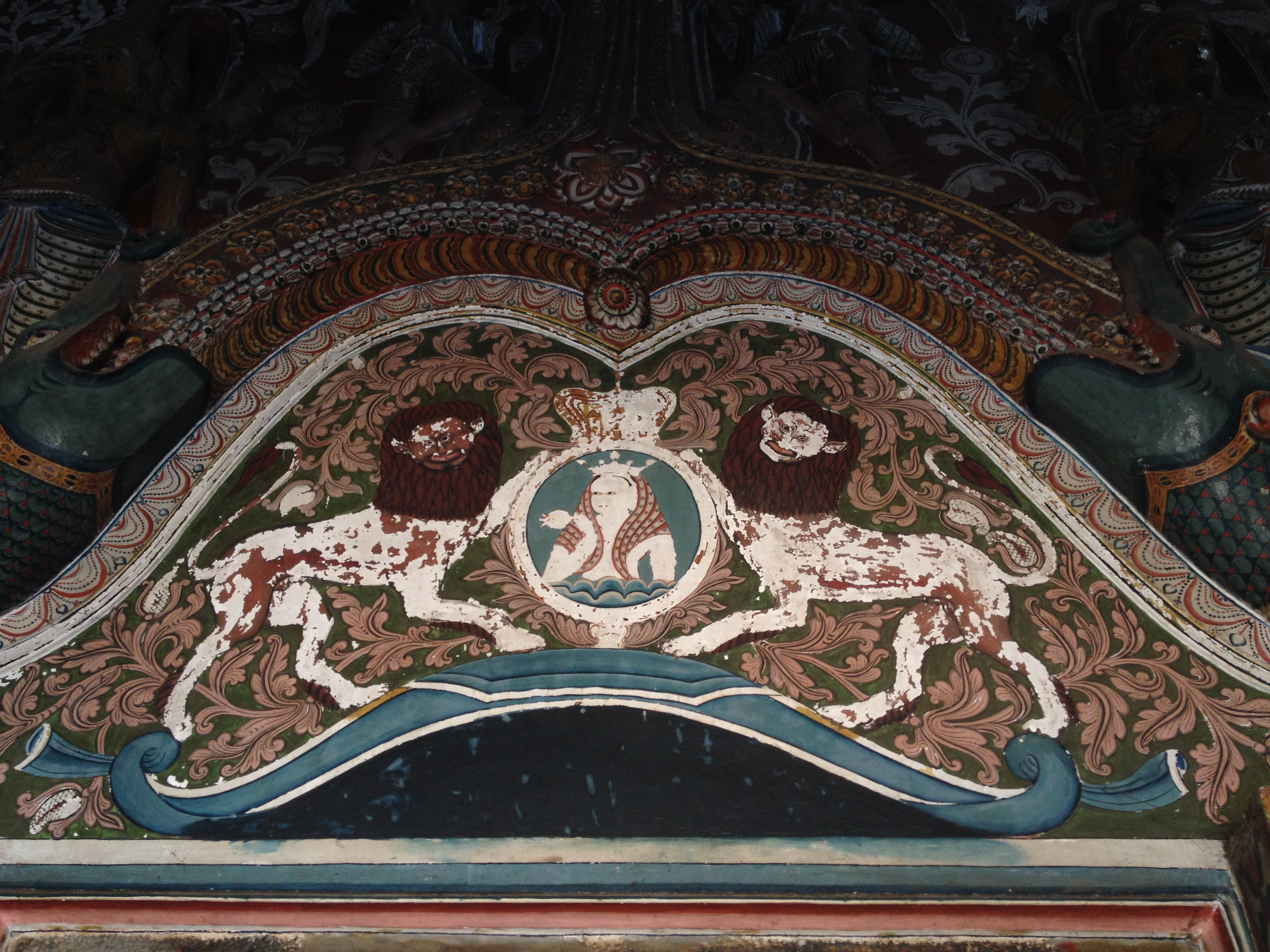
Kotte Raja Maha Vihara

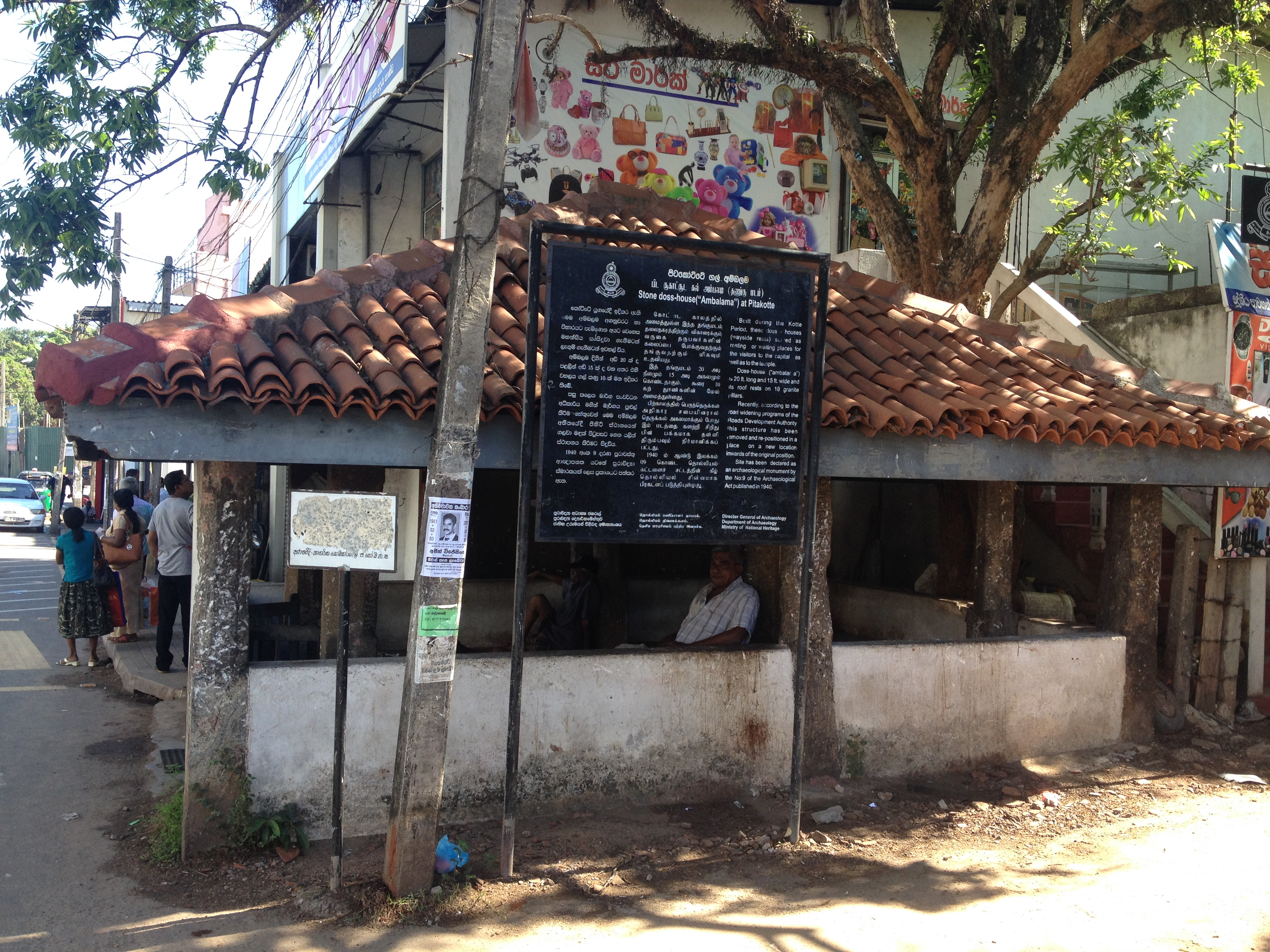
Pita Kotte Gal Ambalama
