= Pitakotte West Grama Niladhari Division =

Pitakotte West
- Grama Niladhari Division
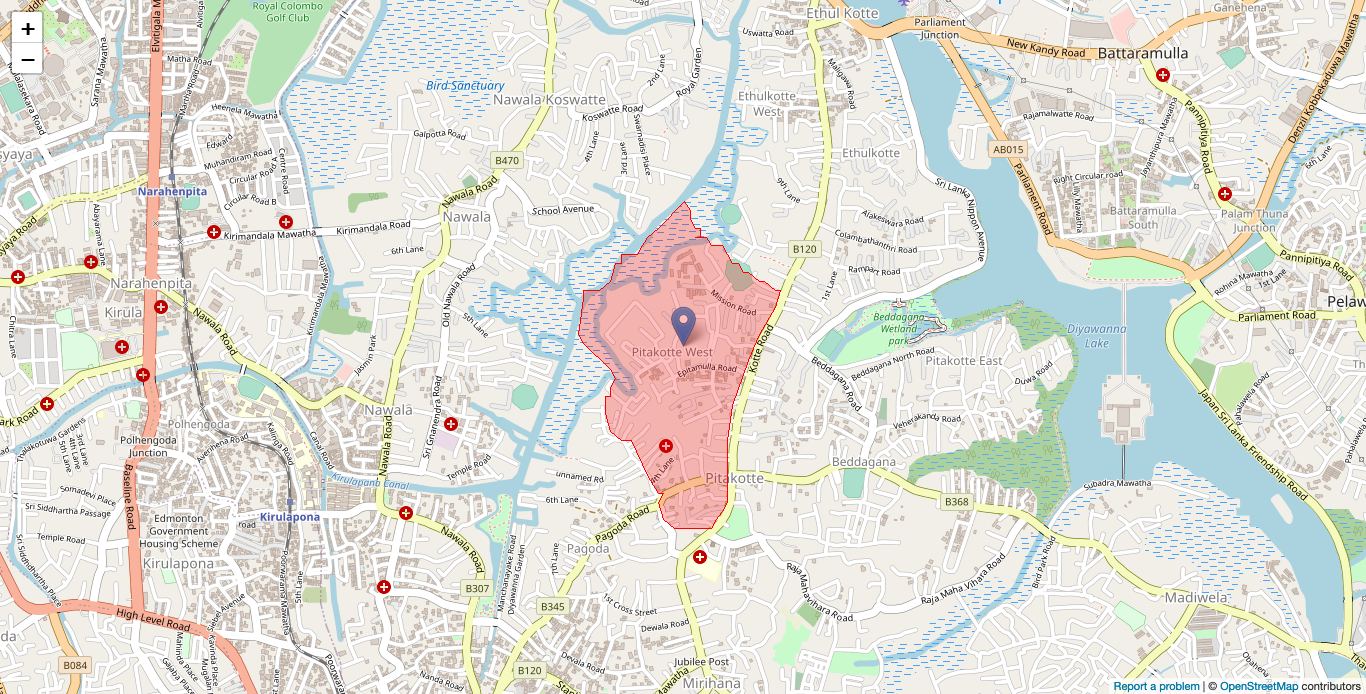
- Pitakotte West Grama Niladhari Division
- Coordinates: 6.889661°N 79.899821°E
- Country: Sri Lanka
- Province: Western Province
- District: Colombo District
- Divisional Secretariat: Sri Jayawardanapura Kotte Divisional Secretariat
- Electoral District: Colombo Electoral District
- Polling Division: Kotte Polling Division

Area
  - Total: 0.94 km^{2} (0.36 sq mi)
- Elevation: 14 m (46 ft)

Population (2012)
  - Total: 5,301
  - Density: 5,639/km^{2} (14,600/sq mi)
- ISO 3166 code: LK-1124060

Pitakotte West Grama Niladhari Division is a Grama Niladhari Division of the Sri Jayawardanapura Kotte Divisional Secretariat of Colombo District of Western Province, Sri Lanka . It has Grama Niladhari Division Code 522.

Ananda Balika Vidyalaya, Kotte, Kotte Museum, Pita Kotte Gal Ambalama and Ananda Sastralaya, Kotte are located within, nearby or associated with Pitakotte West.

Pitakotte West is a surrounded by the Ethulkotte, Pitakotte, Pagoda East, Pagoda, Nawala East, Koswatta and Ethulkotte West Grama Niladhari Divisions.

== Demographics ==
=== Ethnicity ===
The Pitakotte West Grama Niladhari Division has a Sinhalese majority (89.5%) . In comparison, the Sri Jayawardanapura Kotte Divisional Secretariat (which contains the Pitakotte West Grama Niladhari Division) has a Sinhalese majority (84.8%)

Ethnicity in Pitakotte West
1. Sinhalese (89.5%)
2. Sri Lankan Tamil (5.60%)
3. Moor (1.40%)
4. Burgher (1.40%)
5. Indian Tamil (1.00%)
6. Other (1.00%)

=== Religion ===
The Pitakotte West Grama Niladhari Division has a Buddhist majority (76.6%) . In comparison, the Sri Jayawardanapura Kotte Divisional Secretariat (which contains the Pitakotte West Grama Niladhari Division) has a Buddhist majority (77.1%)

Religion in Pitakotte West
1. Buddhist (76.6%)
2. Roman Catholic (9.60%)
3. Other Christian (9.00%)
4. Hindu (2.70%)
5. Muslim (2.00%)
6. Other (0.20%)

== Gallery ==
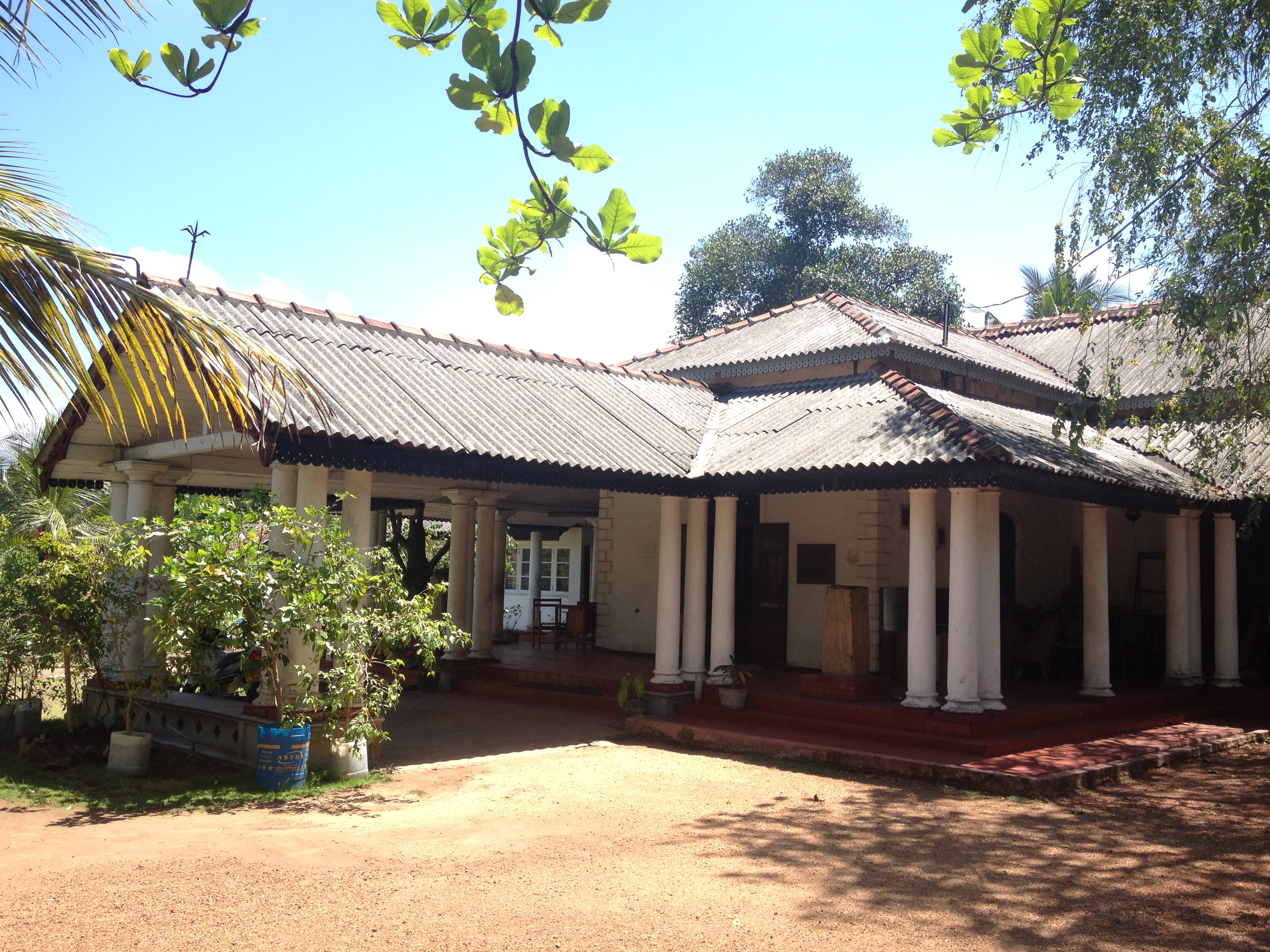
Kotte Museum

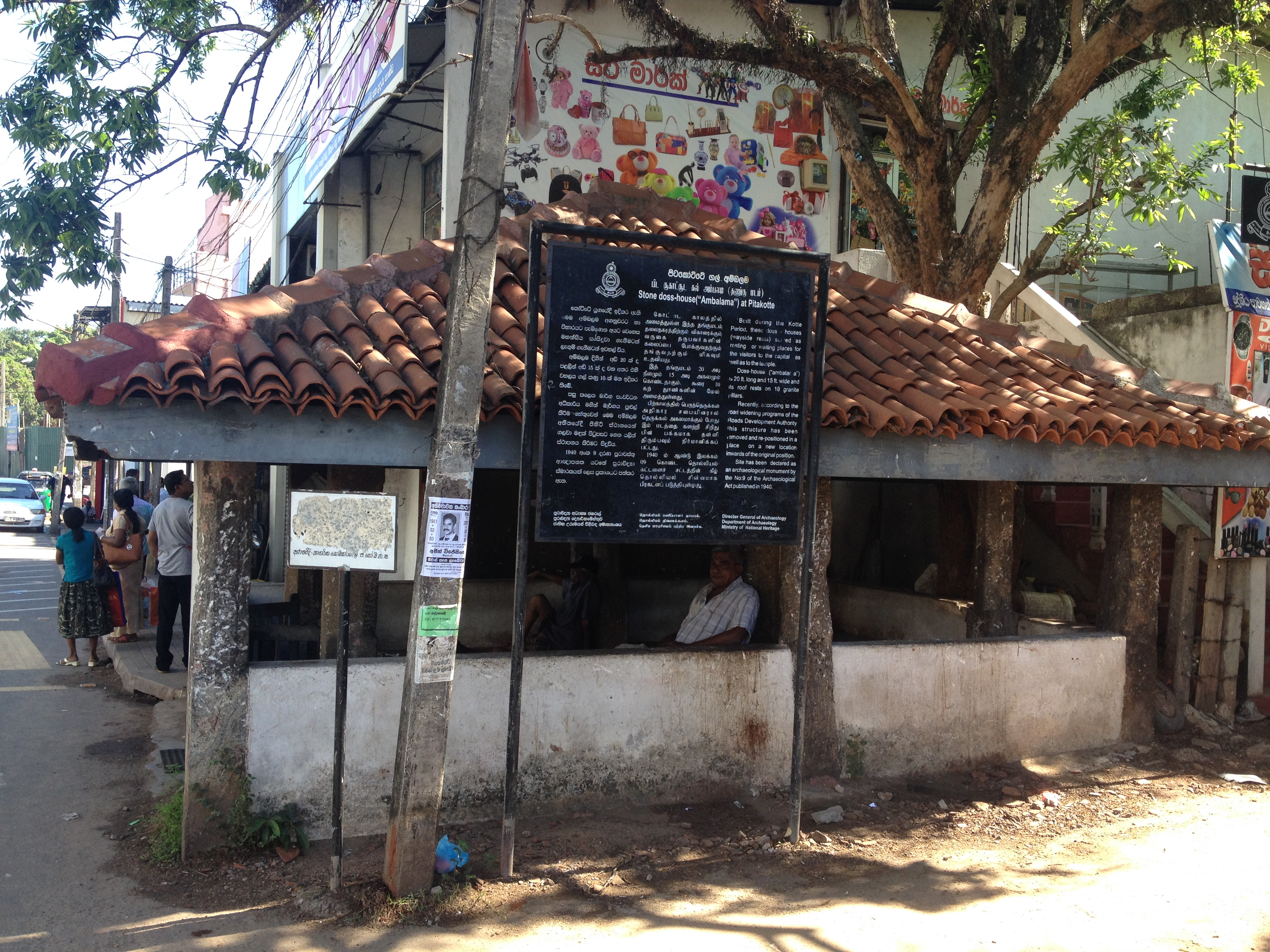
Pita Kotte Gal Ambalama
