= Pagoda East Grama Niladhari Division =

Pagoda East
- Grama Niladhari Division
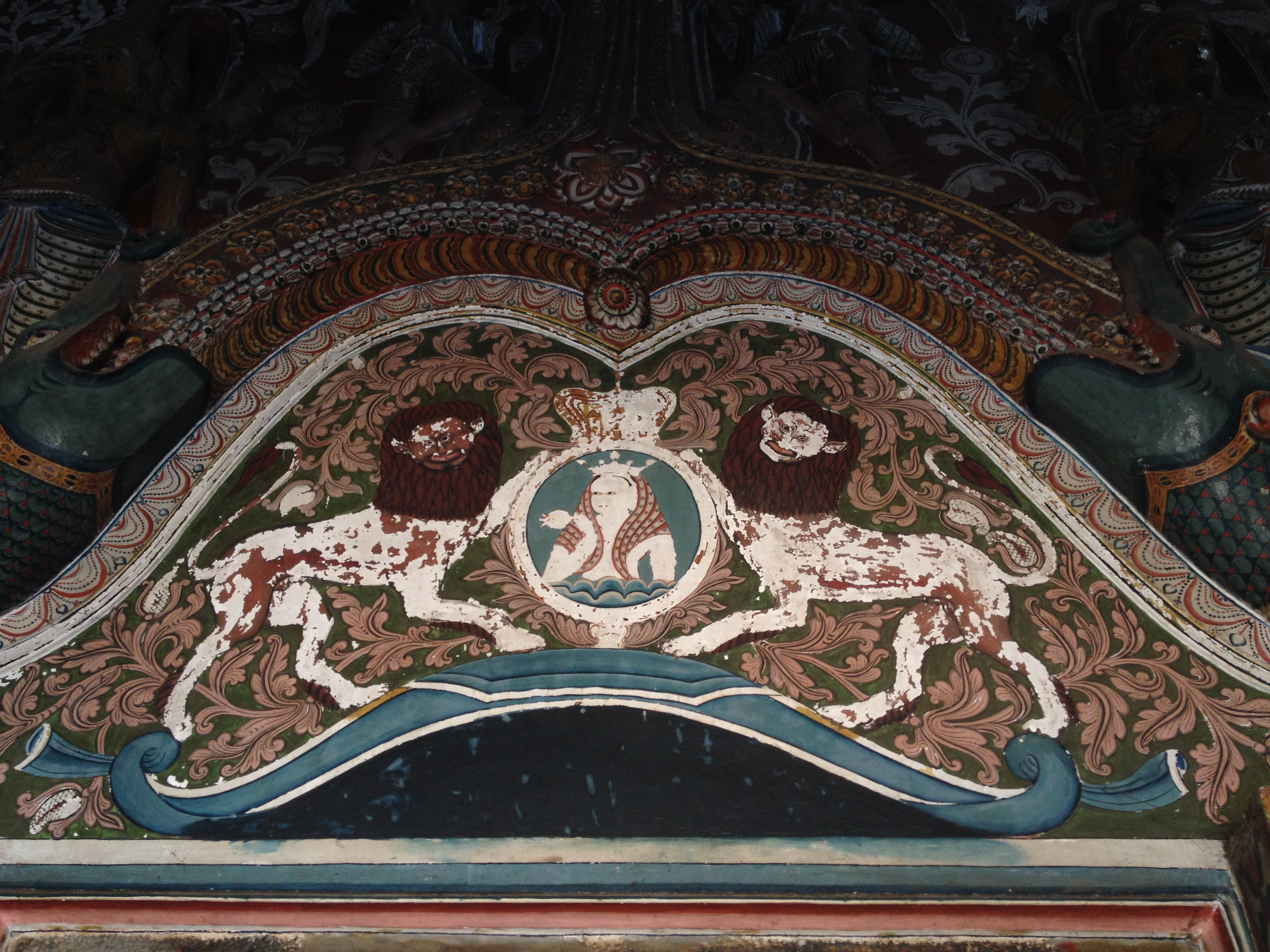
- Kotte Raja Maha Vihara is located within, nearby or associated with the Pagoda East Grama Niladhari Division
- Interactive map of Pagoda East
- Coordinates: 6.873295°N 79.900504°E
- Country: Sri Lanka
- Province: Western Province
- District: Colombo District
- Divisional Secretariat: Sri Jayawardanapura Kotte Divisional Secretariat
- Electoral District: Colombo Electoral District
- Polling Division: Kotte Polling Division

Area
  - Total: 0.72 km^{2} (0.28 sq mi)
- Elevation: 39 m (128 ft)

Population (2012)
  - Total: 5,944
  - Density: 8,256/km^{2} (21,380/sq mi)
- ISO 3166 code: LK-1124085

Pagoda East

Pagoda East Grama Niladhari Division is a Grama Niladhari Division of the Sri Jayawardanapura Kotte Divisional Secretariat of Colombo District of Western Province, Sri Lanka. It has Grama Niladhari Division Code 519C.

Jubilee Post, Nugegoda and Kotte Raja Maha Vihara are located within, nearby or associated with Pagoda East.

Pagoda East is a surrounded by the Mirihana South, Pitakotte West, Gangodavila South, Gangodavila East, Gangodavila North, Nugegoda, Pitakotte and Pagoda Grama Niladhari Divisions.

== Demographics ==
=== Ethnicity ===
The Pagoda East Grama Niladhari Division has a Sinhalese majority (91.1%). In comparison, the Sri Jayawardanapura Kotte Divisional Secretariat (which contains the Pagoda East Grama Niladhari Division) has a Sinhalese majority (84.8%)

Ethnicity in Pagoda East
1. Sinhalese (91.1%)
2. Sri Lankan Tamil (4.90%)
3. Other (4.00%)

=== Religion ===
The Pagoda East Grama Niladhari Division has a Buddhist majority (83.0%). In comparison, the Sri Jayawardanapura Kotte Divisional Secretariat (which contains the Pagoda East Grama Niladhari Division) has a Buddhist majority (77.1%)

Religion in Pagoda East
1. Buddhist (83.0%)
2. Roman Catholic (6.00%)
3. Other Christian (5.30%)
4. Hindu (3.40%)
5. Muslim (2.20%)
6. Other (0.20%)

== Gallery ==
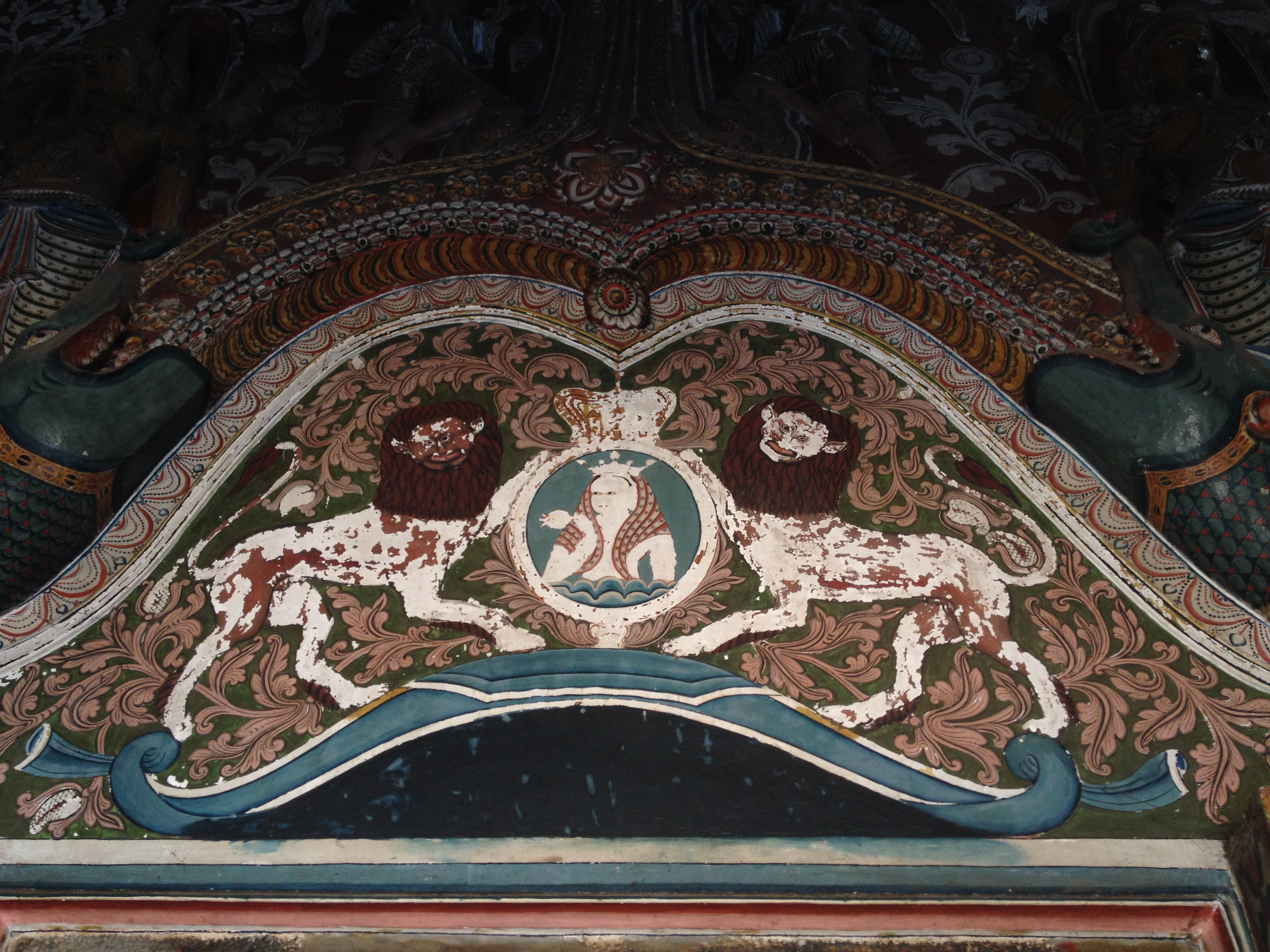
Kotte Raja Maha Vihara
