= Gangodavila South Grama Niladhari Division =

Gangodavila South
- Grama Niladhari Division
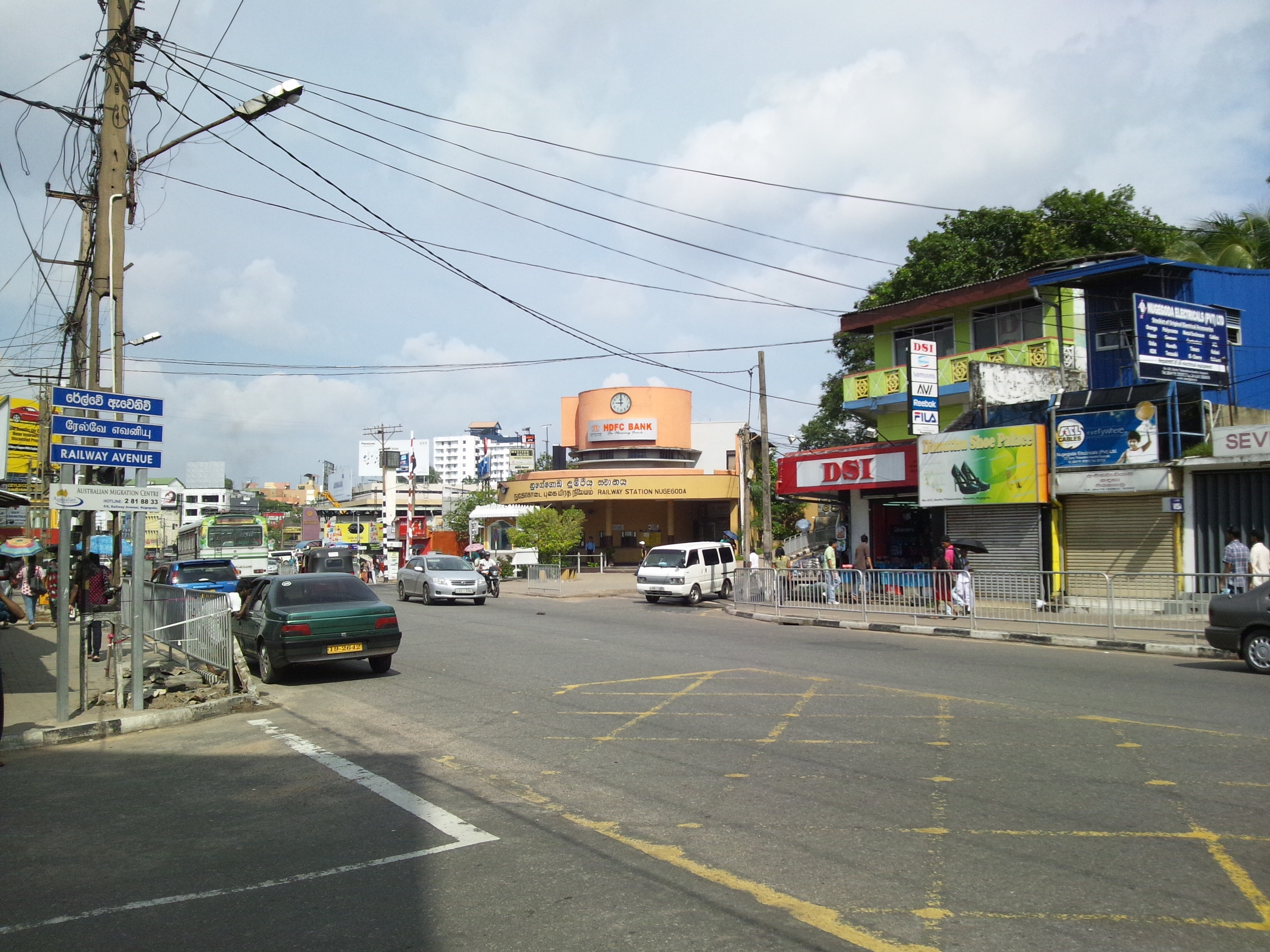
- Nugegoda is located within, nearby or associated with the Gangodavila South Grama Niladhari Division
- Interactive map of Gangodavila South
- Coordinates: 6.864245°N 79.907354°E
- Country: Sri Lanka
- Province: Western Province
- District: Colombo District
- Divisional Secretariat: Sri Jayawardanapura Kotte Divisional Secretariat
- Electoral District: Colombo Electoral District
- Polling Division: Kotte Polling Division

Area
  - Total: 1.0 km^{2} (0.39 sq mi)
- Elevation: 34 m (112 ft)

Population (2012)
  - Total: 7,305
  - Density: 7,305/km^{2} (18,920/sq mi)
- ISO 3166 code: LK-1124095

Gangodavila South

Gangodavila South Grama Niladhari Division is a Grama Niladhari Division of the Sri Jayawardanapura Kotte Divisional Secretariat of Colombo District of Western Province, Sri Lanka. It has Grama Niladhari Division Code 526A.

Nugegoda are located within, nearby or associated with Gangodavila South.

Gangodavila South is a surrounded by the Navinna, Wijerama, Gangodavila South B, Gangodavila North, Pagoda East and Gangodavila East Grama Niladhari Divisions.

== Demographics ==
=== Ethnicity ===
The Gangodavila South Grama Niladhari Division has a Sinhalese majority (95.0%). In comparison, the Sri Jayawardanapura Kotte Divisional Secretariat (which contains the Gangodavila South Grama Niladhari Division) has a Sinhalese majority (84.8%)

Ethnicity in Gangodavila South
1. Sinhalese (95.0%)
2. Sri Lankan Tamil (1.90%)
3. Other (1.90%)
4. Burgher (1.20%)

=== Religion ===
The Gangodavila South Grama Niladhari Division has a Buddhist majority (90.8%). In comparison, the Sri Jayawardanapura Kotte Divisional Secretariat (which contains the Gangodavila South Grama Niladhari Division) has a Buddhist majority (77.1%)

Religion in Gangodavila South
1. Buddhist (90.8%)
2. Roman Catholic (3.70%)
3. Other Christian (2.20%)
4. Muslim (1.60%)
5. Hindu (1.60%)
6. Other (0.10%)

== Gallery ==
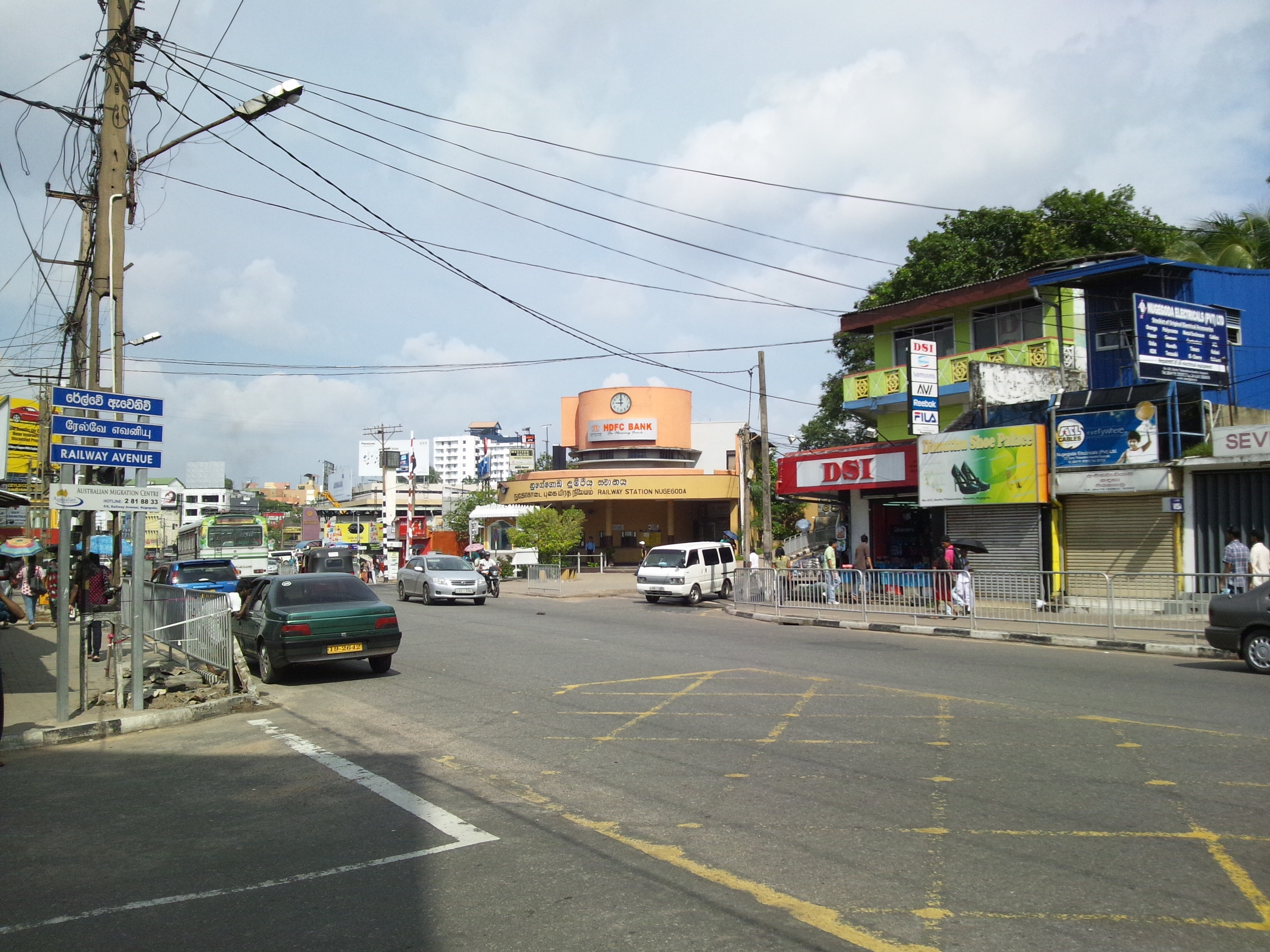
Nugegoda
