= Gangodavila East Grama Niladhari Division =

Gangodavila East
- Grama Niladhari Division
- Interactive map of Gangodavila East
- Coordinates: 6.868678°N 79.907622°E
- Country: Sri Lanka
- Province: Western Province
- District: Colombo District
- Divisional Secretariat: Sri Jayawardanapura Kotte Divisional Secretariat
- Electoral District: Colombo Electoral District
- Polling Division: Kotte Polling Division

Area
  - Total: 0.62 km^{2} (0.24 sq mi)
- Elevation: 35 m (115 ft)

Population (2012)
  - Total: 3,287
  - Density: 5,302/km^{2} (13,730/sq mi)
- ISO 3166 code: LK-1124100

Gangodavila East

Gangodavila East Grama Niladhari Division is a Grama Niladhari Division of the Sri Jayawardanapura Kotte Divisional Secretariat of Colombo District of Western Province, Sri Lanka. It has Grama Niladhari Division Code 526C.

Gangodavila East is surrounded by the Mirihana South, Navinna, Pathiragoda, Udahamulla West, Gangodavila South and Pagoda East Grama Niladhari Divisions.

== Demographics ==
=== Ethnicity ===
The Gangodavila East Grama Niladhari Division has a Sinhalese majority (93.7%). In comparison, the Sri Jayawardanapura Kotte Divisional Secretariat (which contains the Gangodavila East Grama Niladhari Division) has a Sinhalese majority (84.8%)

Ethnicity in Gangodavila East
1. Sinhalese (93.7%)
2. Sri Lankan Tamil (2.80%)
3. Other (2.50%)
4. Moor (1.00%)

=== Religion ===
The Gangodavila East Grama Niladhari Division has a Buddhist majority (86.2%). In comparison, the Sri Jayawardanapura Kotte Divisional Secretariat (which contains the Gangodavila East Grama Niladhari Division) has a Buddhist majority (77.1%)

Religion in Gangodavila East
1. Buddhist (86.2%)
2. Roman Catholic (6.10%)
3. Other Christian (3.90%)
4. Hindu (2.30%)
5. Muslim (1.40%)
6. Other (0.10%)
