= Kotte Museum =

Archaeology museum in Kotte, Sri Lanka

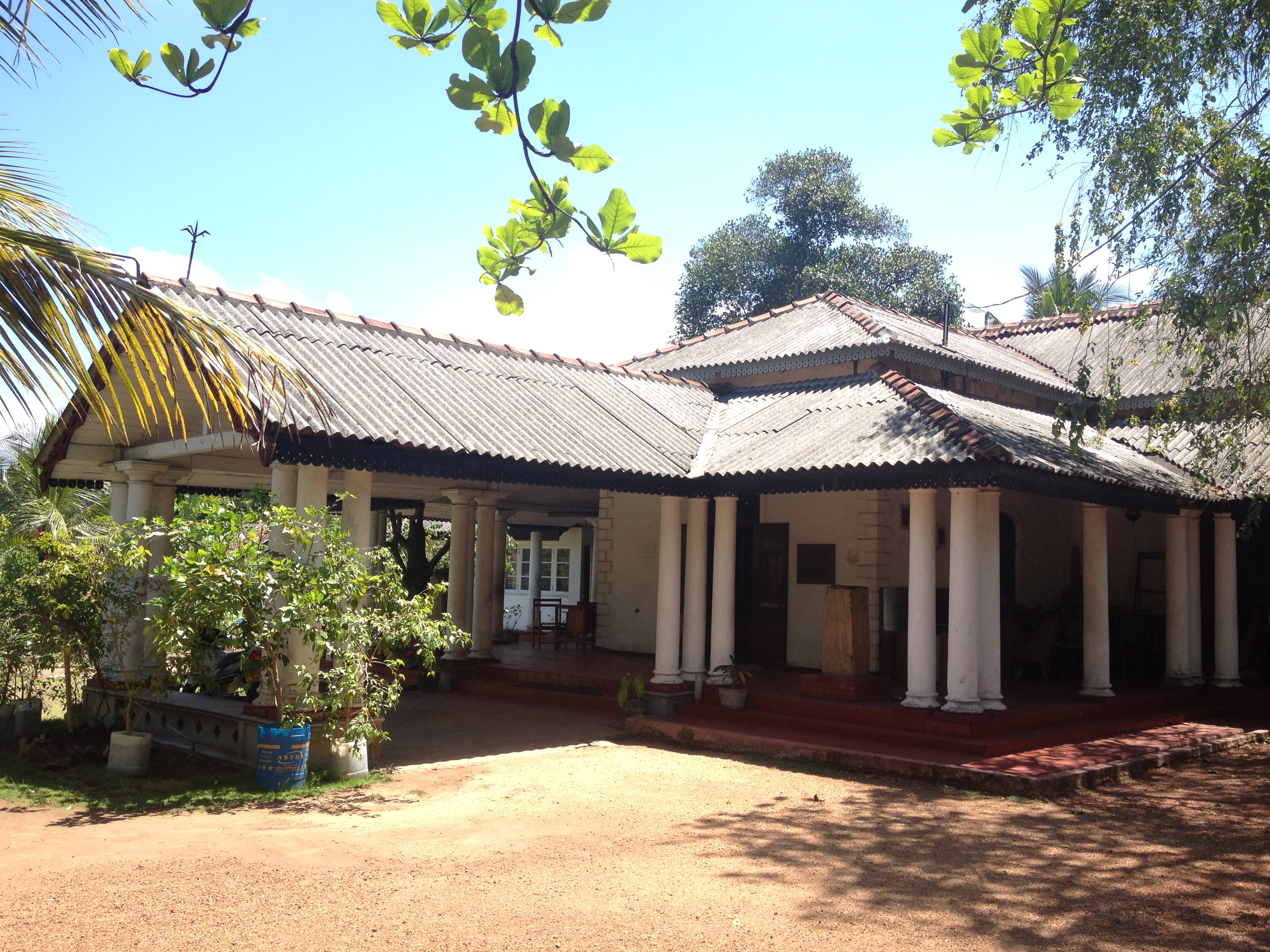
- Archaeological Museum, Kotte
- Established: 1992
- Location: Sri Jayawardenepura Kotte, Sri Lanka
- Coordinates: 6°53′35.6″N 79°54′19.0″E
- Type: Archaeological

Kotte Museum (Sinhala: කෝට්ටේ කෞතුකාගාරය) is an archaeological Museum in Sri Jayawardenepura Kotte, Sri Lanka. It is located at Bangala junction in Ethul Kotte, on the Borella-Pitakotte main road. The museum serves as the regional museum for the country's Western Province and is maintained by the archaeological department of Sri Lanka.

The museum was first established in 1992 as E. W. Perera Memorial Museum in Ihala Walawwa, the residence of E. W. Perera, a prominent figure in the Sri Lankan independence movement, and was declared open to the public in 1995.

The museum building consists of five exhibition rooms and is used to display a variety of archaeological antiquities recovered from Kotte and its surrounding area. They include various regional flags, clothing, statues, coins, swords, knives, guns, weapons, pottery, maps, and a collection of items used by E. W. Perera and items donated by Douglas Ranasinghe.

== See also ==
- List of museums in Sri Lanka
