= Samudradevi Balika Vidyalaya =

- සමුද්‍රදේවී බාලිකා විද්‍යාලය

Location
- Nugegoda, Colombo; Sri Lanka
- Coordinates: 06°52′14.2″N 79°53′25.9″E

Information
- Type: Government school
- Motto: අත්ත දීපා විහරත; Be a Light to Yourself
- Established: 5 May 1915
- Grades: Grade 1 to 13
- Gender: Girls' school
- Age: 6 to 19
- Enrollment: 3000+
- Website: https://samudradevibalika.lk/

Samudradevi Balika Vidyalaya (Sinhala: සමුද්‍රදේවී බාලිකා විද්‍යාලය) is a public girls' school located in Nugegoda, Sri Lanka. It was founded on 5 May 1915 and is considered as the oldest girls' school in Nugegoda.

== History ==
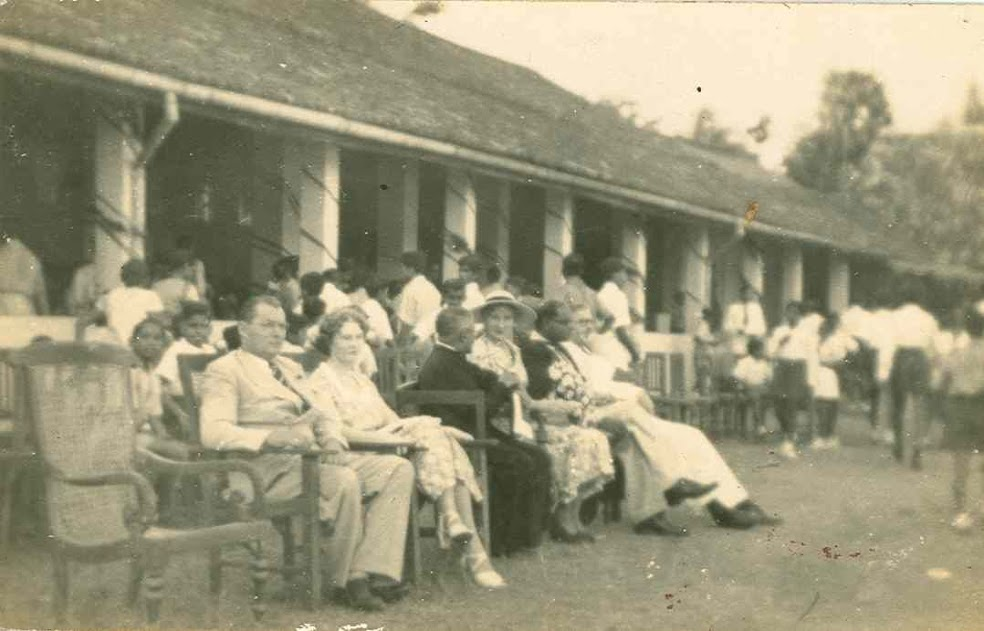
Historical image

Samudradevi Balika Vidyalaya was started as St John's Mixes school with 14 pupils on May 5, 1915. Initially it was a Christian Mission school and the first principal of the school was Rev. Fr. James Henry Wickramanayake. In 1934, the mixes school was separated into Girls' and Boys' schools. The girls' school was known as st John's Girls' School and boys' school was known as St John's boys' college. The schools were under the church of SS Mary and John, Nugegoda.

The girls' school had both English and Sinhala medium classes. There was a Tamil stream as well but the classes were initially at the boys' school and then transferred to a building adjacent to the Church. It became a separate school and was called Tamil Maha Vidyalaya. In 1963 under the government re-organisation of schools, all English medium classes were transferred to st Joseph's Convent. On 1 January 1965 the school was renamed as Samudradevi Ballika Vidyalaya.

== Past Principals ==
1. Mrs. Grace Aldons
2. Miss. Jayasekera
3. Mrs. B. L. Jayathunga
4. Mrs. Padmini Fonseka
5. Mrs. L. B. Walaliyadde
6. Mrs. Rani Fernando
7. Mrs. I. Siriwardena
8. Mrs.Lorna Kumaratunga
9. Mrs. M.K. Perera
10. Mrs. P. Kalubovila
11. Mrs. W.S. Ranasinghe
12.Mrs. Sureka Siriwardhana

== Notable alumni ==
- Damitha Abeyratne
- Soma Edirisinghe
- Uresha Ravihari
