= Yachting Association of Sri Lanka =

Sports governing body in Sri Lanka

Coordinates: 06°52′45″N 79°53′30″E

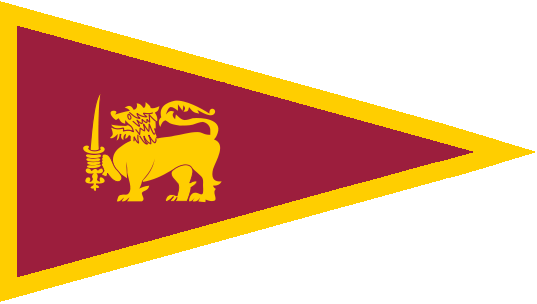
- Sport: Sailing
- Jurisdiction: Sri Lanka
- Abbreviation: SRI
- Founded: 1958
- Affiliation: ISAF
- Affiliation date: 1967
- Regional affiliation: ASCON
- Headquarters: Level 4, 1 Lake Crescent
- Location: Colombo
- President: Joseph Kenny
- Vice president(s): Senaka Senaviratne
- Secretary: Chandima Gunawardene

Official website
- www.yasl.info
- (Sri Lanka)

Yachting Association of Sri Lanka (YASL) is recognised by the International Sailing Federation as the governing body for the sport of sailing in Sri Lanka.

== Clubs ==
- Royal Colombo Yacht Club
- Ceylon Motor Yacht Club
- Dehaweela Sailing Club (closed 1973)
- Sri Lanka Navy Sailing Club
- Bentota Windsurfing Club
- Ruhunu Sailing Association (established 2006)
- Kalpitiya Windsports Club

The Royal Colombo Yacht Club (RCYC) was formerly known as 'Colombo Sailing Club'. In 1898 the club received a royal charter and was renamed to the Royal Colombo Yacht Club. In the 1980s the club had to leave its club house at Colombo Harbour to accommodate the expansion of the port and for security reasons. The club then shared facilities with the Ceylon Motor Yacht Club at Bolgoda Lake, Moratuwa. In 2005 a new clubhouse was constructed on the beach at Mt. Lavinia, adjacent to the Lifesaving Association's building.

The Ceylon Motor Yacht Club (CMYC) was established in 1929 and has operated from its current location on the shores of Lake Bolgoda since 1936.

== Events ==
- Sailing Nationals
- South Asian Yachting Regatta (formerly Tri-nation Regatta)
- Colombo to Galle Regatta
- Royal Thomian Optimist Sailing Regatta
- 2006 Enterprise World Championship
- 2011 GP14 World Championship
- 2012 IODA Optimist Asian Championship

The YASL has seen its activity much reduced during the past three decades owing to the civil war in the island. Even so, the YASL manages to organize regattas regularly, like the Janashanthi Sailing Nationals. In July 2004 the Yachting Association of Sri Lanka revived the Tri-nation Regatta, in which yachts from India and Pakistan compete with local yachts. The Sailing Nationals are generally held in January and contested by four different dinghy classes: Enterprise; GP14; Optimist and Laser, together with windsurfers.

The YASL has a sailing school and a small Optimist fleet.

== Notable competitive sailors ==
(International events with minimum 3 participating ISAF nations)

- Ray Wijewardene - Silver medalist 1970 Asian Games Dinghy; Enterprise
- Lalin Jirasinha - Bronze medalist 1998 Asian Games Dinghy; Enterprise
- Krishan Janaka - Bronze medalist 1998 Asian Games Dinghy; Enterprise
