= St. Joseph's Boys' College, Nugegoda =

- සාන්ත ජොසප් පිරිමි විදුහල

Location
- Nugegoda, Colombo; Sri Lanka; 6.867076°N 79.895190°E

Information
- Type: Semi Government
- Motto: facta non verba -deeds not words -
- Established: January 1, 1953
- Founder: Rev. Fr. Charles Rayman OMI
- Principal: Rev.Fr.Lakmin Prasanga Silva
- Staff: 93
- Grades: 1 to 13 Local Syllabus
- Gender: Boys
- Age: 6 to 19
- Enrollment: 1404
- Language: English; Sinhala
- Colours: Blue and Yellow
- Affiliation: Roman Catholic
- Website: stjosephscollegenugegoda.lk

St. Joseph's Boys' College (Sinhala: සාන්ත ජොසප් පිරිමි විදුහල) is a distinguished boys only primary to secondary (inclusive) school in the Nugegoda Colombo, Sri Lanka. It was founded in 1953 by very Rev. Fr. Charles Raymond, who then was the Vicar General of the Archdiocese of Colombo. St Joseph's Boys' College is a Semi-Government Roman Catholic school.

== College ==
=== Location ===
Situated in 7th Mile Post, Nugegoda a residential suburb of Colombo, it occupies an area of 10 acres along the Subhadrarama Lane, bordered by St. Joseph's Church - Nugegoda to the east; Erabadu Mawatha to the west.

== School traditions ==
=== College anthem ===
The school song is "In the revered capital of Lanka", which is sung at the start of the school day and on important occasions. The words of song were composed by Bro. Lal Fonseka.

== Past principals ==
The first principal was Miss. Gozmeo Indian. During 1985-2022 Marist Brothers took over the management of the school. In 2022 the school was taken under the administration of The Archdiocese of Colombo.

=== Principals ===
Name	Entered office	Departed Office
Miss. Gozmio; Mr. Molrich; Mr. Oliver; Mr. Arisanayagam; Mr.Anthony Jayamanna; Mr. Samuel Joseph; Rev. Fr. Marcus Ferdinandez; Rev. Fr. Benedic Mendis; Rev. Fr. Charls Soza	1953-1985	
Rev. Bro. Jerad Pieris	1985	1989
Rev. Bro. Gregary Appuhamy	1989	1990
Rev. Bro. Sunanada Alwis	1990	1991
Rev. Bro. Gregary Fonseka	1991	1995
Rev. Bro. Lal Fonseka	1995	2000
Rev. Bro. Charles Fernando	2000	2002
Rev. Bro. Godfrey Perera	2002	2008
Rev. Bro. Robert Miranda	2008	2009
Rev. Bro. Joseph Pieris	2009	2011
Rev. Bro. Chinthana Nonis	2011	2017
Rev. Bro. Noel Fonseka	2017	2018
Rev. Bro. Sunanda Alwis	2018	2021
Rev.Fr. Lakmin Prasanga Silva	2022	incumbent

== Sports and extracurricular activities ==
=== Houses ===
There are 3 houses in the primary school and the collegiate school:

- Anthony
- Cooray
- Raymond

The house Raymond named for Fr. Charles Raymond, who were involved in the development of the school from the start.

=== Sport Clubs ===
- Athletics
- Badminton
- Basketball
- Cricket
- Karate
- Swimming
- volleyball

== Co-Curricular activities ==
=== Prefects Association ===
The Prefects Association is composed of Senior Prefects and Junior Prefects from grades 10 to 13.

=== Clubs and societies ===
- Meida Unit
- Scouts
- Singhalese drama troop
- English drama troop
- Traffic wardens Team

== Old Boys' Association ==
The Old Boys' Association (OBA) is the alumni society for the college. Founded in 2000s, and was set up to further the interests of the college and its past and present members, and to keep former pupils in touch with each other and with the school. The OBA carry out development projects for the college.

== See also ==
- List of Marist Brothers schools
