= Pagoda Grama Niladhari Division =

Pagoda
- Coordinates: 6.880655°N 79.896714°E
- Country: Sri Lanka
- Province: Western Province
- District: Colombo District
- Divisional Secretariat: Sri Jayawardanapura Kotte Divisional Secretariat
- Electoral District: Colombo Electoral District
- Polling Division: Kotte Polling Division

Population (2012)
  - Total: 5,446
- ISO 3166 code: LK-1124075

Pagoda Grama Niladhari Division

Pagoda Grama Niladhari Division is a Grama Niladhari Division of the Sri Jayawardanapura Kotte Divisional Secretariat, of Colombo District, of Western Province, Sri Lanka.

== Demographics ==
=== Ethnicity ===
Pagoda by Ethnicity
1. Sinhalese (91.3%)
2. Sri Lankan Tamil (2.6%)
3. Indian Tamil (0.5%)
4. Moor (2.3%)
5. Malay (0.5%)
6. Burgher (2.1%)
7. Chetty (0%)
8. Bharatha (0%)
9. Others (0.6%)

=== Religion ===
Pagoda by Religion
1. Buddhist (81.4%)
2. Hindu (2.1%)
3. Islam (3.1%)
4. Roman Catholic (8.4%)
5. Other Christian (4.9%)
6. Others (0.1%)
