= Kotte Raja Maha Vihara =

Kotte Raja Maha Vihara (English: Kotte Great Royal Temple)
- කෝට්ටේ රජ මහා විහාරය / Kotte Raja Maha Vihara
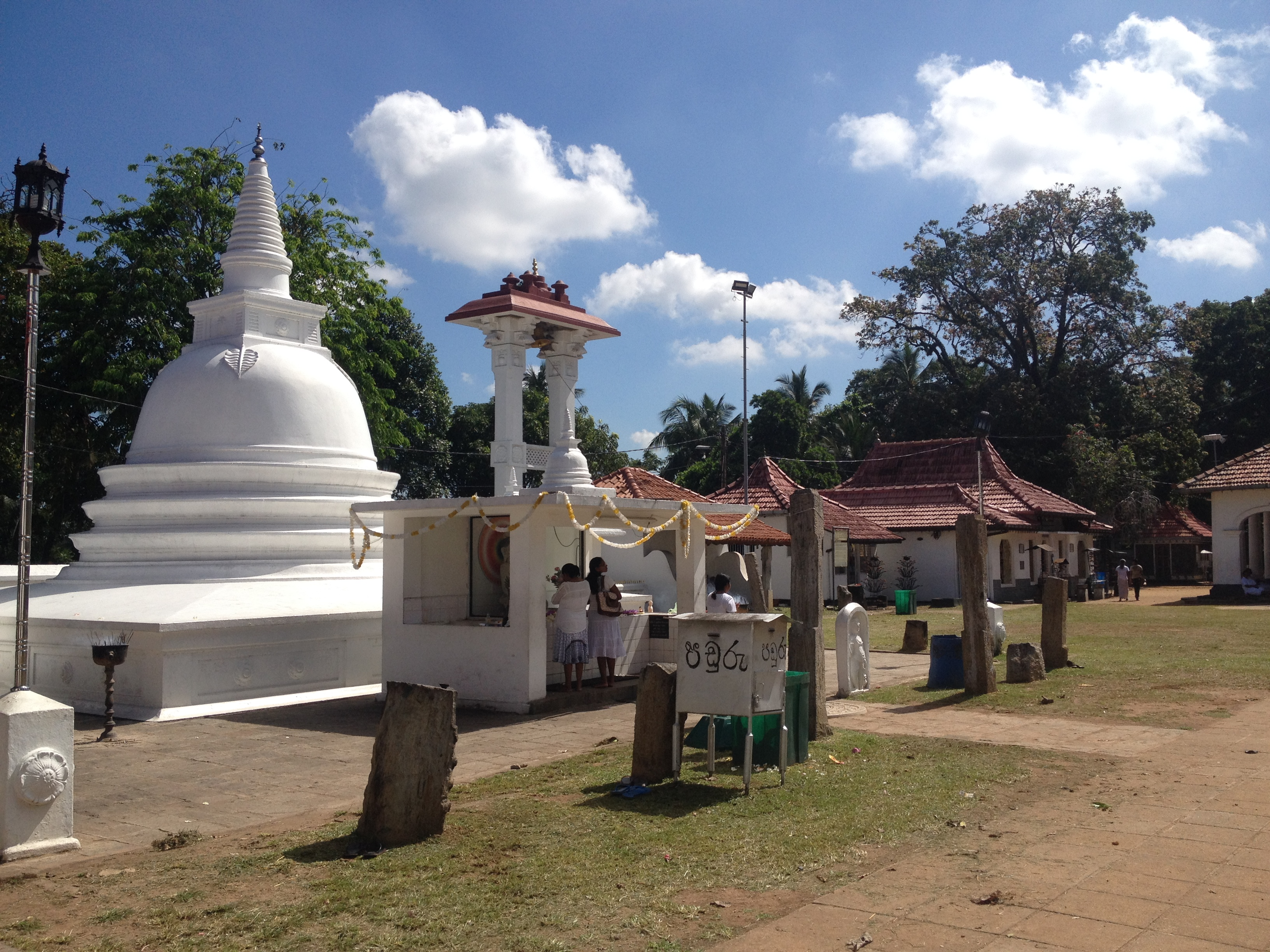
- The Stupa and ruined stone pillars at the Vihara premises

Religion
- Affiliation: Buddhism
- District: Colombo
- Province: Western Province

Location
- Location: Sri Jayawardenepura Kotte, Sri Lanka
- Interactive map of Kotte Raja Maha Vihara (English: Kotte Great Royal Temple)
- Coordinates: 06°52′51.5″N 79°54′17.3″E

Architecture
- Type: Buddhist Temple

Kotte Raja Maha Vihara (Sinhala: කෝට්ටේ රජ මහා විහාරය, English: Kotte Great Royal Temple) is a historic Buddhist temple situated in Sri Jayawardenepura Kotte, Western province, Sri Lanka. It is located near to the historic building Pita Kotte Gal Ambalama at the Pita Kotte junction on Kotte road. The temple has been formally recognised by the Government as an archaeological site in Sri Lanka. The designation was declared on 17 May 2013 under the government Gazette number 1811. As part of the name of several temples, Raja Maha Vihara means in English: Great Royal Temple or Great Royal Monastery. It designates ancient Sri Lankan Buddhist temples that historically received royal patronage and donations from the king.

== History ==
The history of Kotte Raja Maha Vihara dates back to the Kingdom of Kotte. During the reign of King Parakumbha VI (1415–1467) the construction of the temple was begun and completed in all aspects with the royal patronage. King built the temple closer to his royal palace, to doing the necessary duties to the Sangha community.

During the Dutch presence in the country Kotte temple was completely destroyed by them. The temple was re-established in 1818 after the destroyed temple was found out by Ven. Pilane Buddha Rakkitha thero. However most of the constructions and artifacts of the original temple had been destroyed and taken away by the foreigners leaving only a few ruins at the place. It is said that only some ruins of the present Stupa, parts of Katharagama Devalaya, and some stone pillars were remained in the Vihara premises.

=== Literature ===
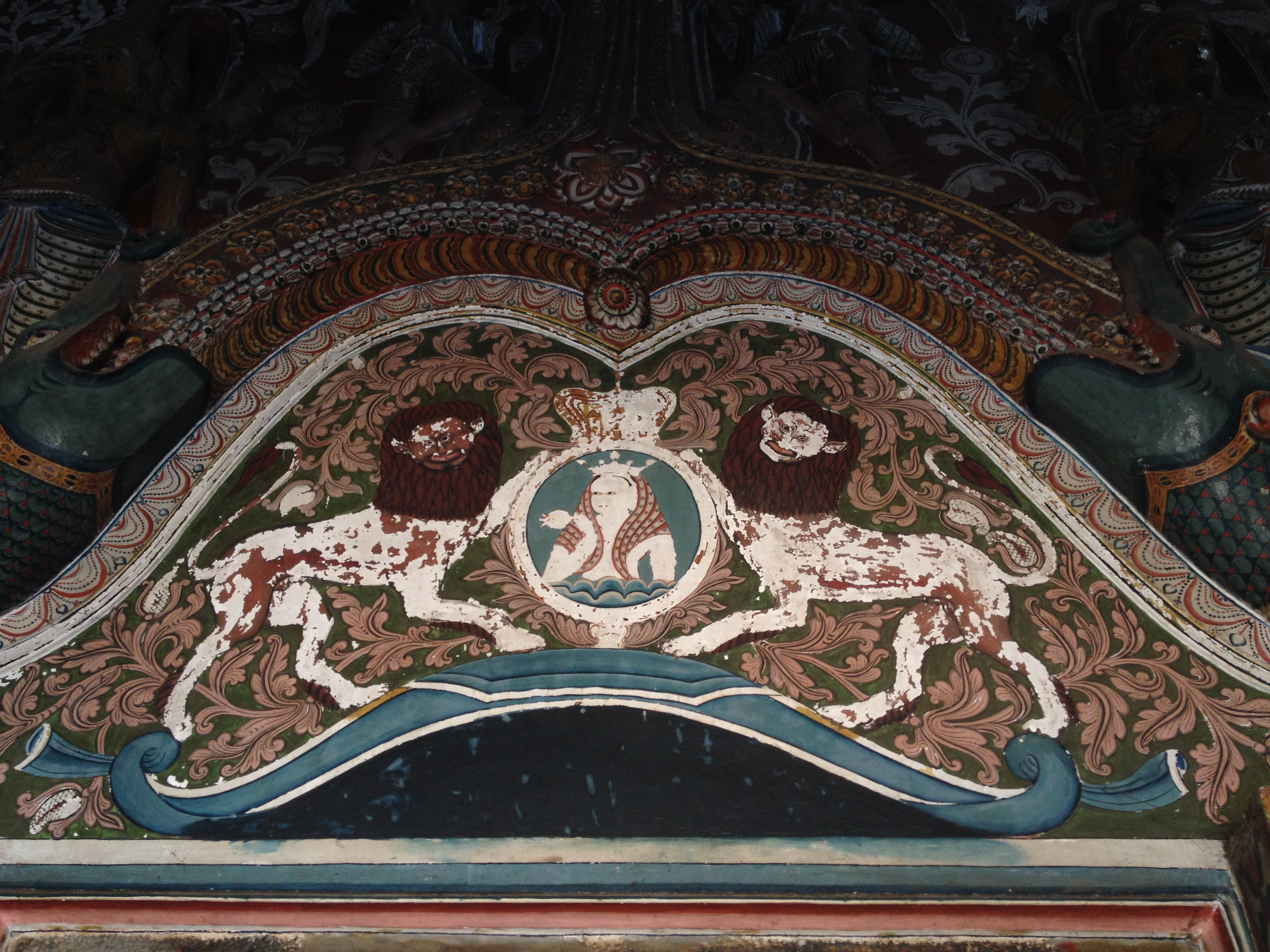
A portrait of Queen Victoria over the inner entrance door of the image house

The Kotte Raja Maha Vihara is mentioned in Aththaragama Bandara Rajaguru's book Vihara Asna (Nam Potha), a Kandyan period compiled book about the important Buddhist centers in Sri Lanka. According to that book Kotte temple is described as Oth Pilima geya and Jayawardenepura Kotte Shanmuga Devalaya which are believed to be the image house with reclining Buddha at Kotte Vihara done by King Parakumbha VI and the Devalaya in front of it. Beside that the temple has also been described in the poetic literature (Sandesha Kavya) of the era.

== Murals ==
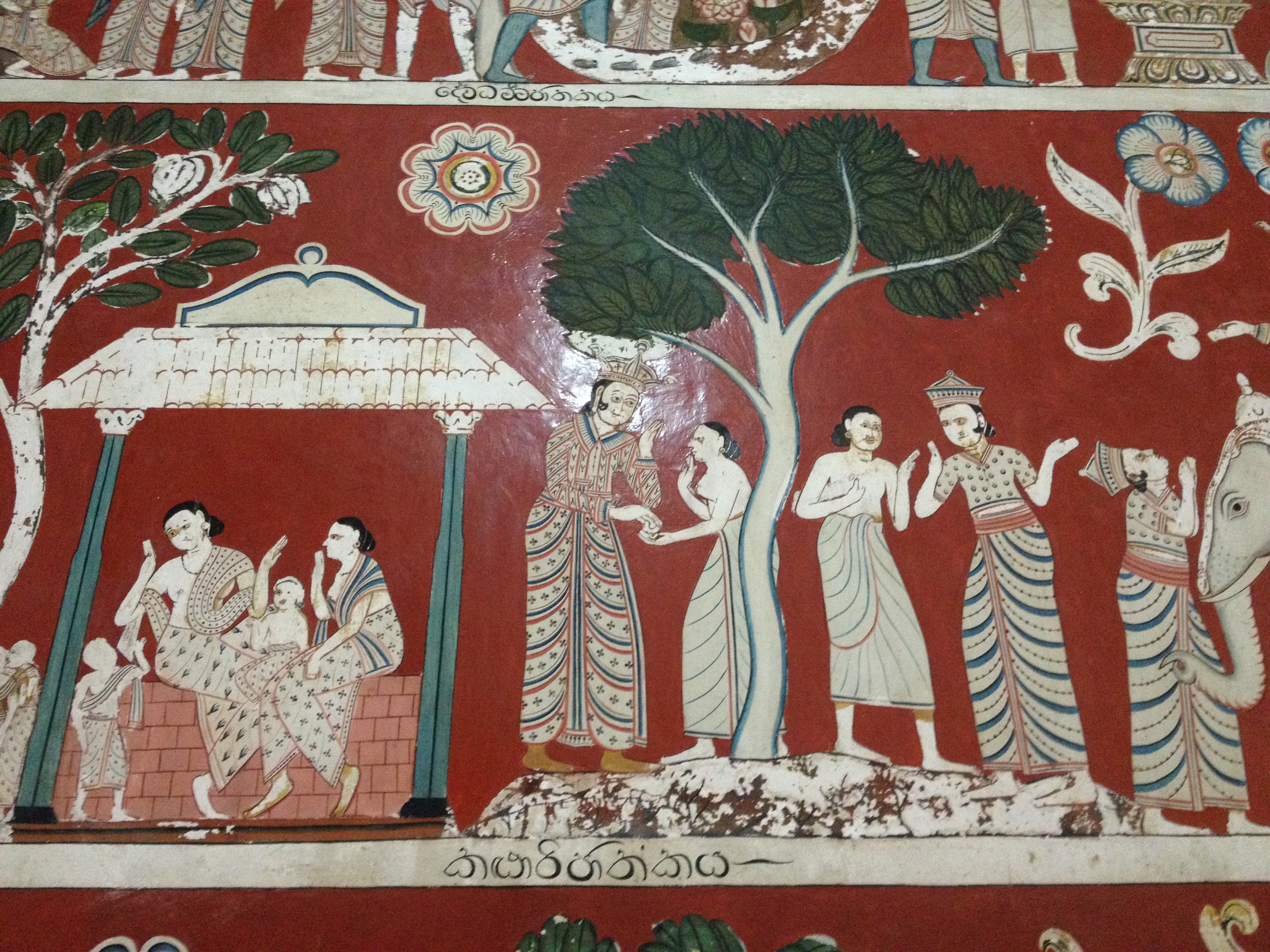
The Kandyan era paintings

The image house of Kotte Raja Maha Vihara consists of two chambers and the walls of inner chamber are adorned with Kandyan Era Frescoes. The outer chamber is seem to be constructed recently with modern frescoes. The inner chamber has two entrances, framed with sculpted Makara Thorana (Dragon arches). A portrait of the Queen Victoria has been painted over the right side entrance door in a framed portrait, accompanied by two lions.

== Dalada Perahera ==
In every year a Perahera (a procession) is conducted in the Kotte Vihara, in memory of and to honour the Sacred Relic of the tooth of the Buddha as the kingdom of Kotte once abode the Sacred Tooth Relic. The Perahera was first started in 1415 by King Parakumbha VI under the counsel of Weedagama Maithree Thero. After the collapsed of Kotte Kingdom the Perahera function was stopped and again started in 1901 by Ven. Embulgama Wimalatissa Thero.

== See also ==
- Karagampitiya Vihara
