= Jubilee Post, Nugegoda =

Coordinates: 6°52′34.34″N 79°54′2.24″E

Jubilee Post (Sinhala: ජුබිලි කණුව) Nugegoda is a commemorative marker, at the intersection of Stanley Thilakarathne Mawatha (B120) and Old Kottawa Road, formerly King George Avenue (B291), recognising the Golden Jubilee of Queen Victoria in 1887. The post was initially erected on the road verge but was subsequently relocated to the middle of the intersection. It was moved again in 2020 when the intersection was upgraded.

The post is approximately 1.2 m (3 ft 11 in) high and is fixed to a rectangular base, 52 cm (20 in) by 34 cm (13 in) and 26 cm (10 in) tall. The inscriptions on the post are in English and Sinhalese.

It is maintained by the Sri Jayawardenapura Kotte Municipal Council, who have painted the post white. On 8 July 2005 it was gazetted as an archaeological protected monument by the government.
