= Pita Kotte Gal Ambalama =

- පිටකෝට්ටේ ගල් අම්බලම
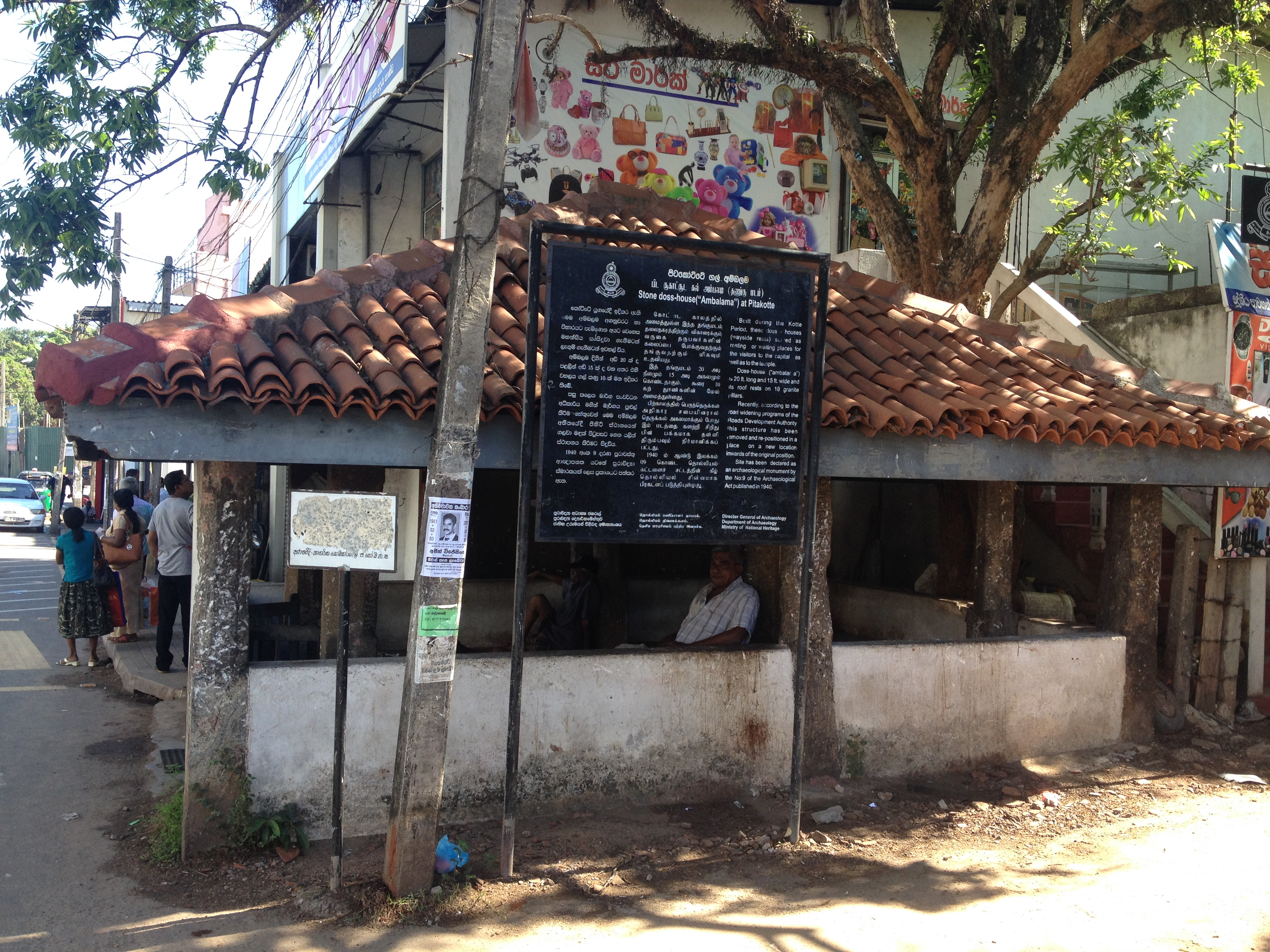
- Interactive map of the Pita Kotte Gal Ambalama area

General information
- Status: Preserved
- Architectural style: Ambalama
- Location: Pita Kotte, Sri Jayawardenepura Kotte, Sri Lanka
- Coordinates: 06°53′00.5″N 79°54′07.3″E

Design and construction
- Designations: Archaeological protected monument

Pita Kotte Gal Ambalama (Sinhala:පිටකෝට්ටේ ගල් අම්බලම) is a historic Ambalama building (wayside rest) situated at Pita Kotte junction, Western province, Sri Lanka. It was used as a resting place or waiting place for the visitors who came to ancient capital of Kotte kingdom as well as Kotte Raja Maha Vihara. The building has been formally recognised by the Government as an archaeological protected monument under the No.9 of the Government Archaeological Act published in 1940.

Pita Kotte Gal Ambalama dates back to the time of the Kotte period. The earliest written evidence about this Ambalama is found in a map of the Kingdom of Kotte (1413–1565) which depicts the present site of the Ambalama. The structure however was dismantled and re-located recently due to widening of the road by Road Development Authority and is now situated a few metres away from its original position.
