= Nugegoda =

Nugegoda නුගේගොඩ நுகேகொடை
- Suburb
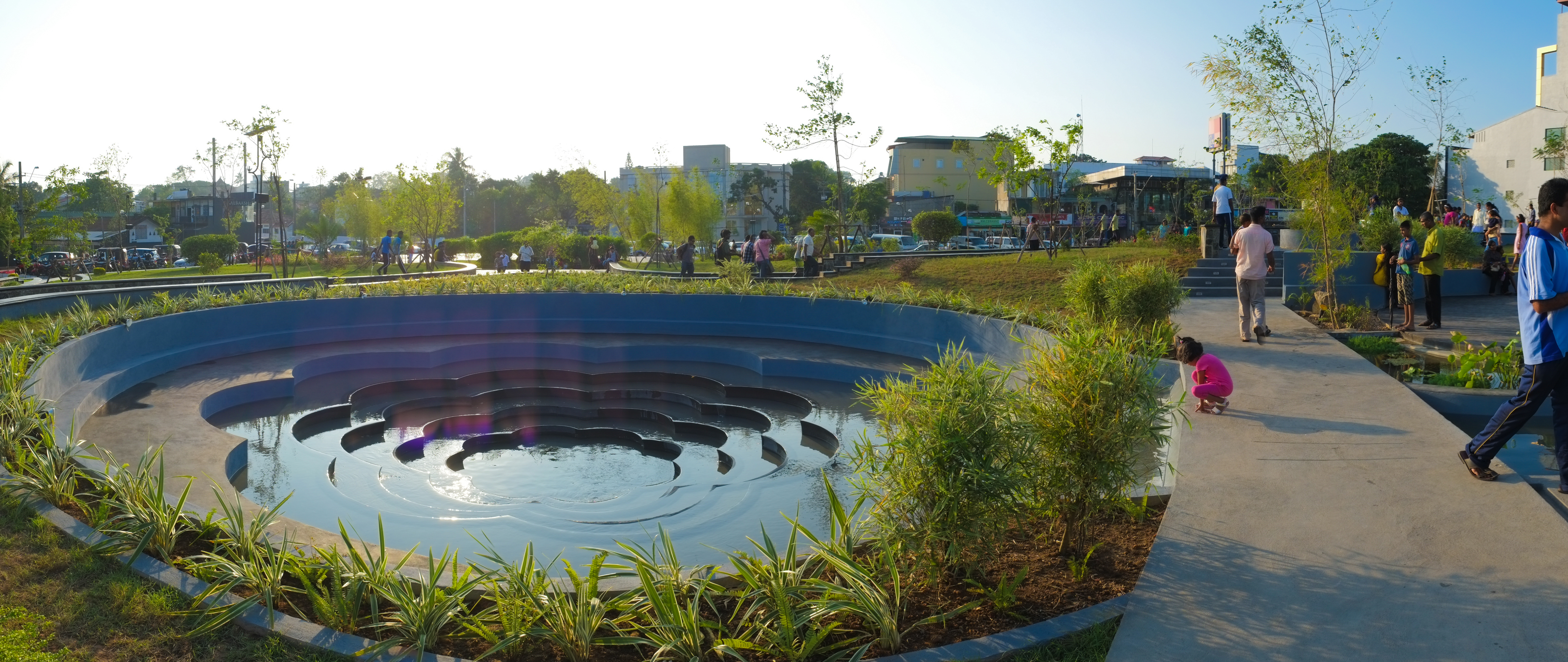
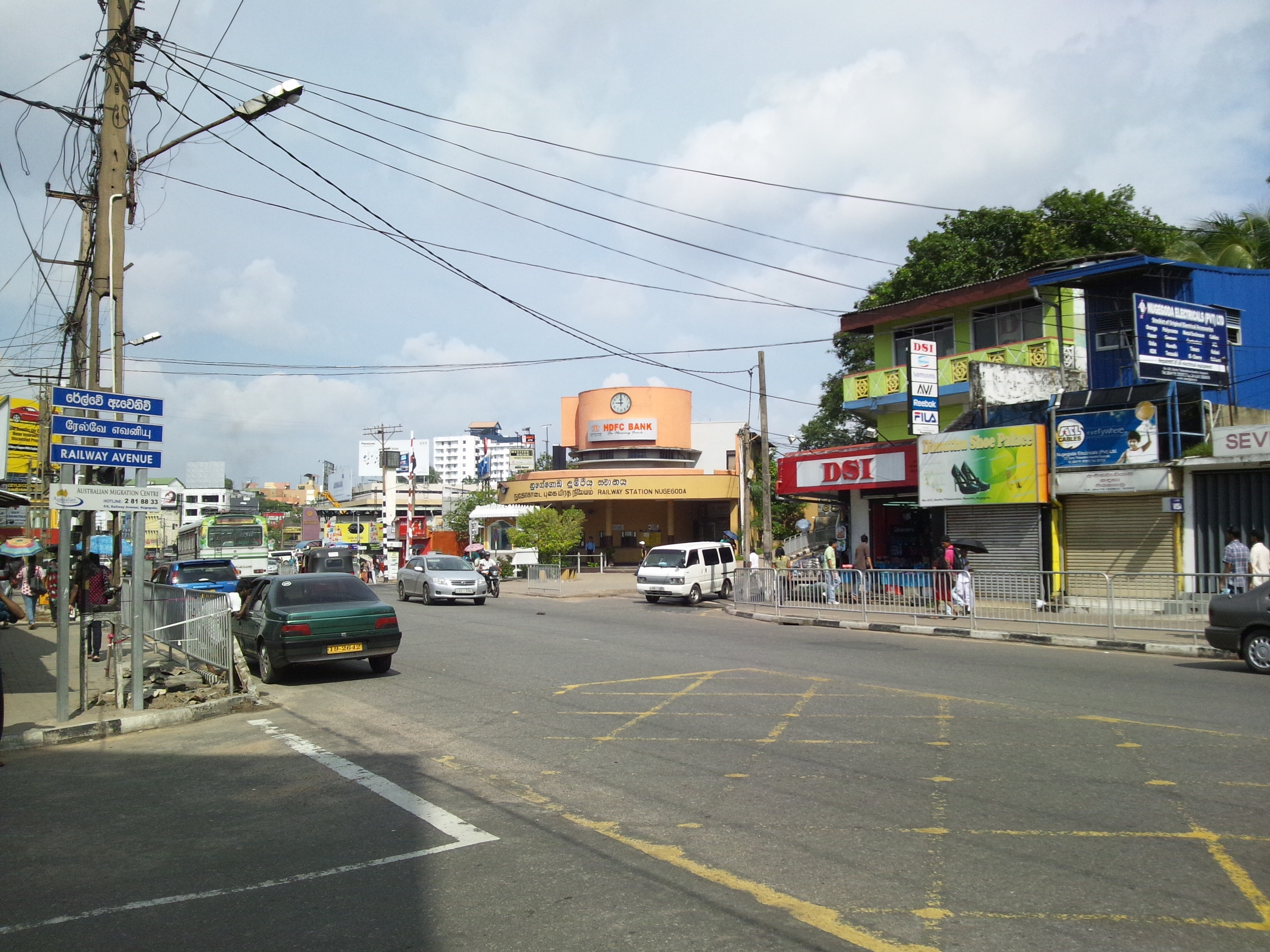
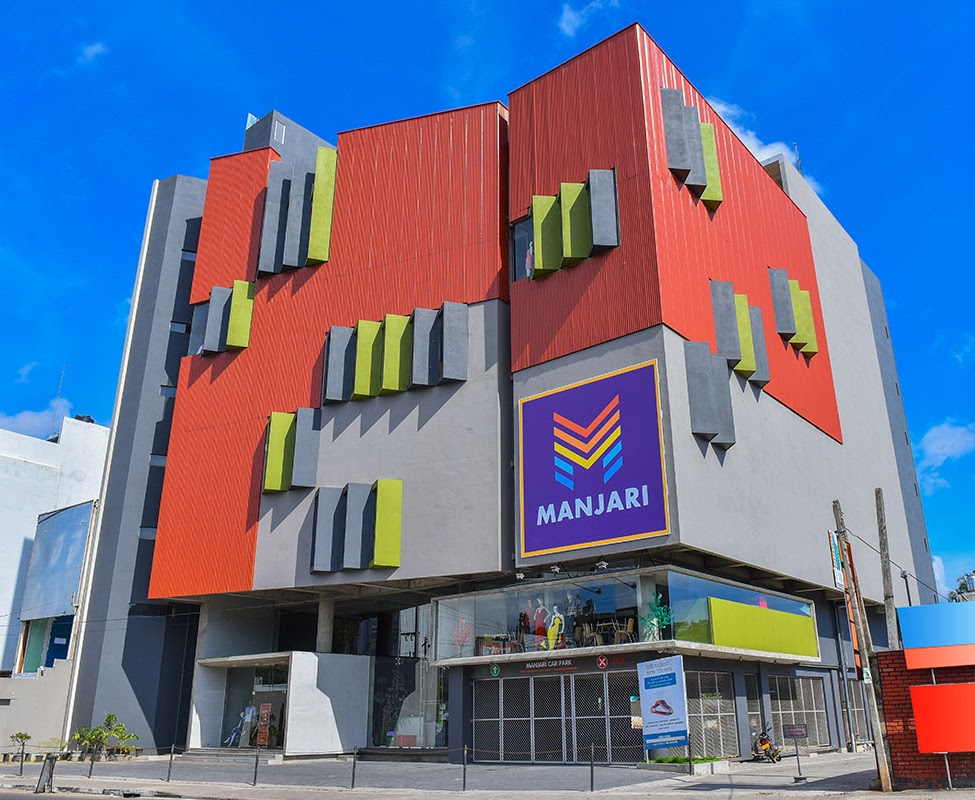
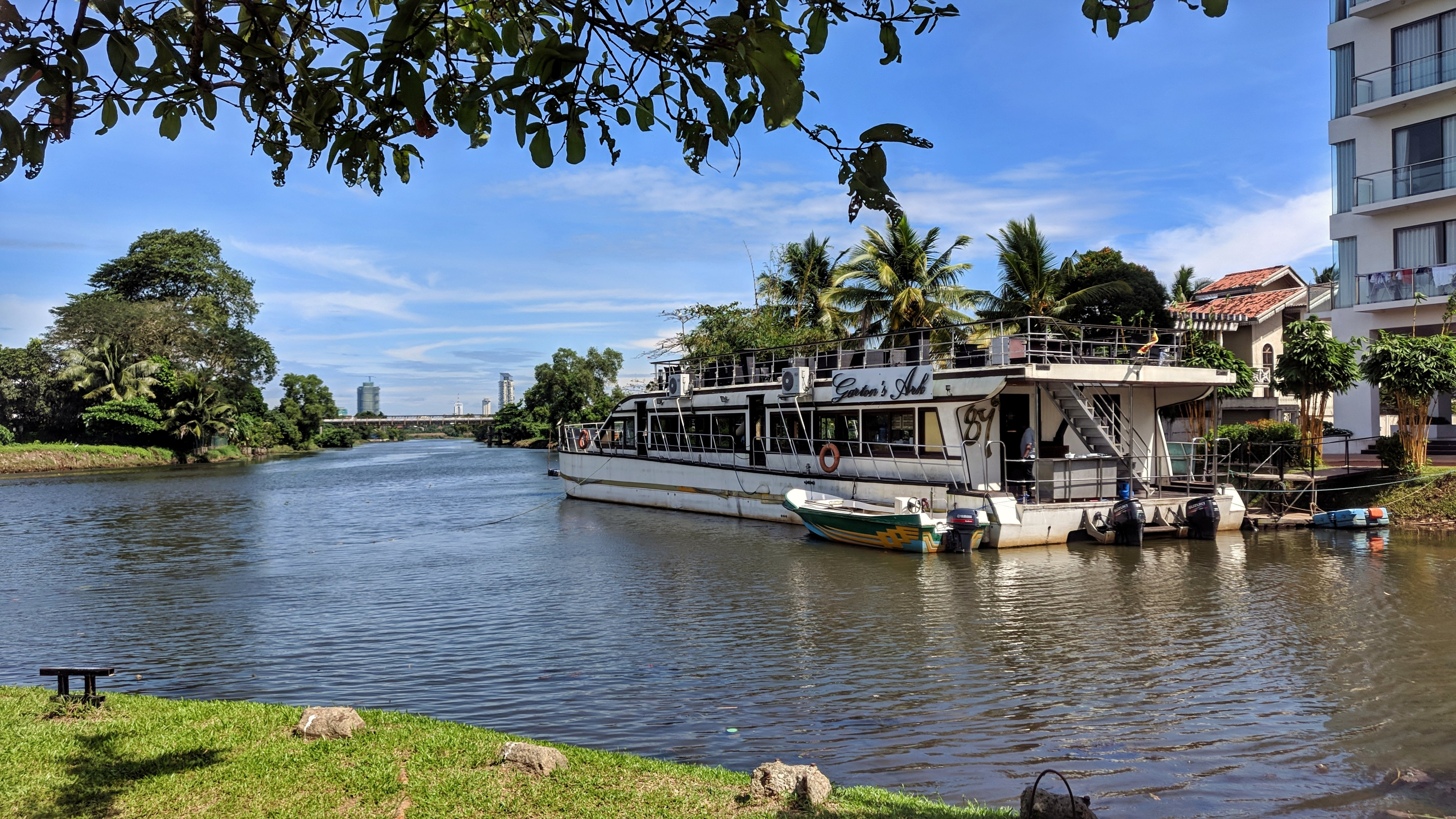
- Nugegoda town

- Location within Colombo District
- Coordinates: 6°51′50″N 79°53′56″E
- Country: Sri Lanka
- Province: Western Province
- District: Colombo District
- Time zone: UTC+5:30 (Sri Lanka Standard Time Zone)
- Postal Code: 10250

Nugegoda (Sinhala: නුගේගොඩ) is a large, densely populated suburb of Colombo, Sri Lanka. It is located just south of Sri Jayawardenapura Kotte/Maharagama and north-east of Dehiwela Mt. Lavinia. It has a population of over 250,000 people.

== Education ==
Schools in the region include:

- Open University of Sri Lanka Nawala
- Anula Vidyalaya
- Lyceum International School
- Royal Institute International School
- Samudradevi Balika Vidyalaya
- St. John's College, Nugegoda
- St. Joseph's Boys' College, Nugegoda
- Sujatha Vidyalaya

== Communal Transportation ==
Railway

The city of Nugegoda has three railway stations located within its boundaries.

- Nugegoda Railway Station located in the heart of the city, just beside the Main Bus Stand and the shopping complex.
- Pangiriwatte Railway Station located near the Delkanda Junction on the Old Kesbewa road.
- Udahamulla Railway Station located on the Nugegoda - Hokandara road (Route 689), close to the Udahamulla Junction.

Bus routes which operate through Nugegoda.

- 112 - Maharagama - Kotahena (via Bambalapitiya, Colpetty & Fort)
- 118 - Dehiwala - Beddagana (via Dehiwala Zoo, Kalubowila & Jubilee Post)
- 122 - Avissawella - Pettah
- 125 - Ingiriya/Padukka - Colombo
- 131 - Maharagama - Wellampitiya (via Havelock, Narahenpita, Borella, Dematagoda & Kolonnawa)
- 138 - Homagama/Kottawa/Maharagama - Pettah
- 138/2 - Mattegoda - Pettah
- 138/3 - Rukmalgama - Pettah
- 138/4 - Athurugiriya - Pettah
- 138/5 - Mullegama - Pettah (via Godagama & Homagama)
- 138/280 - Diyagama - Pettah (via Kottawa & Dolekade Junction)
- 163 - Dehiwala - Battaramulla (via Pagoda & Kotte)
- 176 - Dehiwala/Karagampitiya - Hettiyawatta (via Dehiwala Zoo)
- 313 - Homagama - Kalubowila (via Kottawa Maharagama & Kohuwala)

Bus routes which terminate at Nugegoda.

- 115 - Pettah (via Jawatte & Torrington)
- 117 - Ratmalana Railway station (via Gamsaba Junction, Pepiliyana, Attidiya & Maliban Junction)
- 119 - Maharagama (via Jubilee Post, Embuldeniya & Old Kottawa road)
- 156 - Dehiwala (via Kohuwala, Anderson road & Nedimala Junction)
- 168 - Kotahena (via Jubilee Post, Kotte, Rajagiriya, Borella, Slave Island, Fort)
- 173 - Thotalanga (via Nawala & Narahenpita)
- 176 - Hettiyawatta (via Nawala, Rajagiriya, Borella & Armour Street)
- 183 - Panadura (via Kalubowila, Dehiwala & Moratuwa)
- 212/341 - Bokundara (via Maharagama, Pannipitiya, Erawwala & Makuludoowa)
- 259 - Thalapathpitiya (via Jubilee Post)
- 689 - Hokandara/Pittugala (via Udahamulla Railway, Madiwela & Thalawathugoda)
- 690 - Jayawardenepura Hospital (via Jubilee Post, Embuldeniya, Madiwela & Kimbulawala Junction)
- 992 - Athurugiriya (via Maharagama & Pannipitiya)

Long-distance bus services which operate through Nugegoda

- 17 - Panadura - Kandy
- 99 - Badulla /Welimada /Passara/Lunugala - Colombo
- 122 - Kataragama/Hambantota/Embilipitiya/Ratnapura - Colombo
