= Kotte Polling Division =

Kotte
- Polling Division
- Coordinates: 6.884263°N 79.899926°E
- Country: Sri Lanka
- Province: Western Province, Sri Lanka
- Electoral District: Colombo Electoral District

Area
  - Total: 17.06 km^{2} (6.59 sq mi)

Population (2012)
  - Total: 107,883
  - Density: 6,324/km^{2} (16,380/sq mi)
- ISO 3166 code: EC-01I

The Kotte Polling Division is a Polling Division in the Colombo Electoral District, in the Western Province, Sri Lanka.

== Presidential Election Results ==
=== Summary ===
The winner of Kotte has matched the final country result 6 out of 8 times. Hence, Kotte is a Weak Bellwether for Presidential Elections.

Year	Kotte	Colombo Electoral District	MAE %	Sri Lanka	MAE %
2019	SLPP	SLPP	1.63%	SLPP	2.60%
2015	NDF	NDF	2.08%	NDF	6.44%
2010	UPFA	UPFA	0.82%	UPFA	5.98%
2005	UNP	UNP	1.45%	UPFA	1.02%
1999	PA	PA	0.77%	PA	0.84%
1994	PA	PA	0.17%	PA	2.40%
1988	SLFP	UNP	5.53%	UNP	6.77%
1982	UNP	UNP	1.39%	UNP	5.06%
Matches/Mean MAE	6/8	7/8	1.73%	8/8	3.89%

=== 2019 Sri Lankan Presidential Election ===
Party	Kotte		Colombo Electoral District		Sri Lanka	
Party	Votes	%	Votes	%	Votes	%
SLPP	31,853	54.56%	727,713	53.19%	6,924,255	52.25%
NDF	22,628	38.76%	559,921	40.92%	5,564,239	41.99%
NMPP	2,439	4.18%	53,803	3.93%	418,553	3.16%
NPP	875	1.50%	10,335	0.76%	49,655	0.37%
Other Parties (with < 1%)	591	1.01%	16,405	1.20%	295,797	2.23%
Valid Votes	58,386	98.74%	1,368,177	98.89%	13,252,499	98.99%
Rejected Votes	745	1.26%	15,333	1.11%	135,452	1.01%
Total Polled	59,131	79.99%	1,383,510	82.82%	13,387,951	83.71%
Registered Electors	73,926		1,670,403		15,992,568	

=== 2015 Sri Lankan Presidential Election ===
Party	Kotte		Colombo Electoral District		Sri Lanka	
Party	Votes	%	Votes	%	Votes	%
NDF	34,614	58.09%	725,073	55.93%	6,217,162	51.28%
UPFA	24,663	41.39%	562,614	43.40%	5,768,090	47.58%
Other Parties (with < 1%)	311	0.52%	8,673	0.67%	138,200	1.14%
Valid Votes	59,588	98.83%	1,296,360	98.83%	12,123,452	98.85%
Rejected Votes	703	1.17%	15,334	1.17%	140,925	1.15%
Total Polled	60,291	80.46%	1,311,694	81.34%	12,264,377	78.69%
Registered Electors	74,934		1,612,660		15,585,942	

=== 2010 Sri Lankan Presidential Election ===
Party	Kotte		Colombo Electoral District		Sri Lanka	
Party	Votes	%	Votes	%	Votes	%
UPFA	29,125	52.17%	614,740	52.93%	6,015,934	57.88%
NDF	26,129	46.81%	533,022	45.90%	4,173,185	40.15%
Other Parties (with < 1%)	571	1.02%	13,620	1.17%	204,494	1.97%
Valid Votes	55,825	99.01%	1,161,382	99.03%	10,393,613	99.03%
Rejected Votes	557	0.99%	11,394	0.97%	101,838	0.97%
Total Polled	56,382	77.23%	1,172,776	76.09%	10,495,451	66.70%
Registered Electors	73,009		1,541,242		15,734,587	

=== 2005 Sri Lankan Presidential Election ===
Party	Kotte		Colombo Electoral District		Sri Lanka	
Party	Votes	%	Votes	%	Votes	%
UNP	27,106	49.73%	569,627	51.12%	4,706,366	48.43%
UPFA	26,987	49.51%	534,431	47.96%	4,887,152	50.29%
Other Parties (with < 1%)	411	0.75%	10,192	0.91%	123,521	1.27%
Valid Votes	54,504	99.06%	1,114,250	98.86%	9,717,039	98.88%
Rejected Votes	516	0.94%	12,879	1.14%	109,869	1.12%
Total Polled	55,020	75.09%	1,127,129	75.85%	9,826,908	69.51%
Registered Electors	73,274		1,486,021		14,136,979	

=== 1999 Sri Lankan Presidential Election ===
Party	Kotte		Colombo Electoral District		Sri Lanka	
Party	Votes	%	Votes	%	Votes	%
PA	24,782	49.93%	474,310	49.18%	4,312,157	51.12%
UNP	21,455	43.22%	425,185	44.08%	3,602,748	42.71%
JVP	2,075	4.18%	44,009	4.56%	343,927	4.08%
SMBP	763	1.54%	8,209	0.85%	35,854	0.43%
Other Parties (with < 1%)	561	1.13%	12,821	1.33%	140,825	1.67%
Valid Votes	49,636	96.74%	964,534	97.06%	8,435,754	97.69%
Rejected Votes	1,675	3.26%	29,197	2.94%	199,536	2.31%
Total Polled	51,311	72.86%	993,731	73.39%	8,635,290	72.17%
Registered Electors	70,424		1,354,025		11,965,536	

=== 1994 Sri Lankan Presidential Election ===
Party	Kotte		Colombo Electoral District		Sri Lanka	
Party	Votes	%	Votes	%	Votes	%
PA	31,646	64.66%	557,708	64.82%	4,709,205	62.28%
UNP	16,331	33.37%	288,741	33.56%	2,715,283	35.91%
SMBP	521	1.06%	6,059	0.70%	32,651	0.43%
Other Parties (with < 1%)	447	0.91%	7,878	0.92%	104,389	1.38%
Valid Votes	48,945	98.47%	860,386	98.17%	7,561,526	98.03%
Rejected Votes	762	1.53%	16,060	1.83%	151,706	1.97%
Total Polled	49,707	69.80%	876,446	69.59%	7,713,232	69.12%
Registered Electors	71,213		1,259,484		11,158,880	

=== 1988 Sri Lankan Presidential Election ===
Party	Kotte		Colombo Electoral District		Sri Lanka	
Party	Votes	%	Votes	%	Votes	%
SLFP	22,607	51.85%	339,958	46.23%	2,289,857	44.95%
UNP	18,834	43.19%	361,337	49.14%	2,569,199	50.43%
SLMP	2,163	4.96%	34,020	4.63%	235,701	4.63%
Valid Votes	43,604	98.73%	735,315	98.49%	5,094,754	98.24%
Rejected Votes	563	1.27%	11,295	1.51%	91,499	1.76%
Total Polled	44,167	65.73%	746,610	67.53%	5,186,256	55.87%
Registered Electors	67,194		1,105,583		9,283,143	

=== 1982 Sri Lankan Presidential Election ===
Party	Kotte		Colombo Electoral District		Sri Lanka	
Party	Votes	%	Votes	%	Votes	%
UNP	25,129	59.35%	436,290	57.86%	3,450,815	52.93%
SLFP	14,814	34.99%	274,476	36.40%	2,546,348	39.05%
JVP	1,731	4.09%	28,580	3.79%	273,428	4.19%
LSSP	527	1.24%	9,655	1.28%	58,531	0.90%
Other Parties (with < 1%)	140	0.33%	5,030	0.67%	190,929	2.93%
Valid Votes	42,341	99.12%	754,031	98.95%	6,520,156	98.78%
Rejected Votes	374	0.88%	7,990	1.05%	80,470	1.22%
Total Polled	42,715	72.34%	762,021	76.88%	6,600,626	80.15%
Registered Electors	59,048		991,194		8,235,358	

== Parliamentary Election Results ==
=== Summary ===
The winner of Kotte has matched the final country result 6 out of 7 times, with the 2000 election being the exception.

Year	Kotte	Colombo Electoral District	MAE %	Sri Lanka	MAE %
2015	UNP	UNP	1.43%	UNP	6.20%
2010	UPFA	UPFA	1.51%	UPFA	8.92%
2004	UPFA	UNP	3.91%	UPFA	5.16%
2001	UNP	UNP	0.64%	UNP	3.90%
2000	UNP	UNP	0.69%	PA	4.14%
1994	PA	PA	1.97%	PA	3.90%
1989	UNP	UNP	6.20%	UNP	4.66%
Matches/Mean MAE	6/7	5/7	2.34%	7/7	5.27%

=== 2020 Sri Lankan Parliamentary Election ===
Party	Kotte		Colombo Electoral District		Sri Lanka	
Party	Votes	%	Votes	%	Votes	%
SLPFA	29,436	58.51%	674,603	57.04%	6,853,693	59.09%
SJB	14,946	29.71%	387,145	32.73%	2,771,984	23.9%
JJB	3,405	6.77%	67,600	5.72%	445,958	3.84%
UNP	1,563	3.11%	30,875	2.61%	249,435	2.15%
Other Parties (with < 1%)	963	1.91%	22,553	1.9%	1,227,859	11.02%
Valid Votes	50,313	66.91%	1,182,776	69.2%	11,598,936	71.32%
Rejected Votes	2,789	3.71%	81,034	4.74%	744,373	4.58%
Total Polled	53,102	70.62%	1,263,810	73.94%	12,343,309	75.89%
Registered Electors	75,192		1,709,209		16,263,885	

=== 2015 Sri Lankan Parliamentary Election ===
Party	Kotte		Colombo Electoral District		Sri Lanka	
Party	Votes	%	Votes	%	Votes	%
UNP	30,247	54.21%	640,743	53.04%	5,098,916	45.77%
UPFA	20,797	37.27%	474,063	39.25%	4,732,664	42.48%
JVP	4,075	7.30%	81,391	6.74%	544,154	4.88%
Other Parties (with < 1%)	677	1.21%	11,752	0.97%	93,045	0.84%
Valid Votes	55,796	97.38%	1,207,949	96.46%	11,140,333	95.35%
Rejected Votes	1,457	2.54%	43,372	3.46%	516,926	4.42%
Total Polled	57,300	76.47%	1,252,271	78.93%	11,684,111	77.66%
Registered Electors	74,934		1,586,598		15,044,490	

=== 2010 Sri Lankan Parliamentary Election ===
Party	Kotte		Colombo Electoral District		Sri Lanka	
Party	Votes	%	Votes	%	Votes	%
UPFA	22,799	49.42%	480,896	51.23%	4,846,388	60.38%
UNP	16,374	35.49%	339,750	36.19%	2,357,057	29.37%
DNA	6,729	14.59%	110,683	11.79%	441,251	5.50%
Other Parties (with < 1%)	232	0.50%	7,292	0.78%	48,240	0.60%
Valid Votes	46,134	96.04%	938,723	94.85%	8,026,322	96.03%
Rejected Votes	1,877	3.91%	50,354	5.09%	581,465	6.96%
Total Polled	48,036	65.79%	989,729	64.17%	8,358,246	59.29%
Registered Electors	73,009		1,542,457		14,097,690	

=== 2004 Sri Lankan Parliamentary Election ===
Party	Kotte		Colombo Electoral District		Sri Lanka	
Party	Votes	%	Votes	%	Votes	%
UPFA	20,070	37.61%	414,688	39.20%	4,223,126	45.70%
UNP	19,635	36.80%	441,841	41.77%	3,486,792	37.73%
JHU	13,192	24.72%	190,618	18.02%	552,723	5.98%
Other Parties (with < 1%)	460	0.86%	10,713	1.01%	90,868	0.98%
Valid Votes	53,357	97.42%	1,057,860	96.47%	9,241,931	94.52%
Rejected Votes	1,413	2.58%	38,605	3.52%	534,452	5.47%
Total Polled	54,772	73.86%	1,096,571	74.71%	9,777,821	75.74%
Registered Electors	74,159		1,467,751		12,909,631	

=== 2001 Sri Lankan Parliamentary Election ===
Party	Kotte		Colombo Electoral District		Sri Lanka	
Party	Votes	%	Votes	%	Votes	%
UNP	27,717	51.44%	546,417	51.62%	4,086,026	45.62%
PA	18,573	34.47%	353,401	33.39%	3,330,815	37.19%
JVP	5,275	9.79%	117,404	11.09%	815,353	9.10%
SU	1,694	3.14%	16,970	1.60%	50,665	0.57%
Other Parties (with < 1%)	625	1.16%	24,289	2.29%	510,616	5.70%
Valid Votes	53,884	96.95%	1,058,481	96.28%	8,955,844	94.77%
Rejected Votes	1,698	3.05%	40,901	3.72%	494,009	5.23%
Total Polled	55,582	74.97%	1,099,382	76.31%	9,449,878	76.03%
Registered Electors	74,140		1,440,682		12,428,762	

=== 2000 Sri Lankan Parliamentary Election ===
Party	Kotte		Colombo Electoral District		Sri Lanka	
Party	Votes	%	Votes	%	Votes	%
UNP	22,207	42.79%	440,684	43.45%	3,451,765	40.12%
PA	20,249	39.02%	394,146	38.86%	3,899,329	45.33%
SU	4,881	9.40%	49,671	4.90%	127,859	1.49%
JVP	3,566	6.87%	78,133	7.70%	518,725	6.03%
Other Parties (with < 1%)	997	1.92%	51,586	5.09%	375,083	4.36%
Valid Votes	51,900	N/A	1,014,220	N/A	8,602,617	N/A

=== 1994 Sri Lankan Parliamentary Election ===
Party	Kotte		Colombo Electoral District		Sri Lanka	
Party	Votes	%	Votes	%	Votes	%
PA	28,106	53.70%	469,642	50.94%	3,887,805	48.94%
UNP	21,215	40.53%	385,100	41.77%	3,498,370	44.04%
MEP	1,975	3.77%	42,734	4.64%	68,538	0.86%
SLPF	742	1.42%	11,454	1.24%	90,078	1.13%
Other Parties (with < 1%)	301	0.58%	13,003	1.41%	51,995	0.65%
Valid Votes	52,339	97.24%	921,933	96.18%	7,943,688	95.20%
Rejected Votes	1,485	2.76%	36,635	3.82%	400,395	4.80%
Total Polled	53,824	75.58%	958,568	76.04%	8,344,095	74.75%
Registered Electors	71,213		1,260,686		11,163,064	

=== 1989 Sri Lankan Parliamentary Election ===
Party	Kotte		Colombo Electoral District		Sri Lanka	
Party	Votes	%	Votes	%	Votes	%
UNP	20,113	46.93%	374,530	51.67%	2,838,005	50.71%
SLFP	17,007	39.68%	205,053	28.29%	1,785,369	31.90%
MEP	3,030	7.07%	76,966	10.62%	90,480	1.62%
USA	2,041	4.76%	31,873	4.40%	141,983	2.54%
Other Parties (with < 1%)	670	1.56%	36,420	5.02%	269,739	4.82%
Valid Votes	42,861	96.60%	724,842	95.36%	5,596,468	93.87%
Rejected Votes	1,507	3.40%	35,271	4.64%	365,563	6.13%
Total Polled	44,368	67.24%	760,113	69.87%	5,962,031	63.60%
Registered Electors	65,984		1,087,891		9,374,164	

== Demographics ==
=== Ethnicity ===
The Kotte Polling Division has a Sinhalese majority (84.8%) . In comparison, the Colombo Electoral District (which contains the Kotte Polling Division) has a Sinhalese majority (76.5%), a significant Moor population (10.7%) and a significant Sri Lankan Tamil population (10.1%)

Ethnicity in Kotte
1. Sinhalese (84.8%)
2. Sri Lankan Tamil (6.90%)
3. Moor (5.10%)
4. Other (3.20%)

=== Religion ===
The Kotte Polling Division has a Buddhist majority (77.1%) . In comparison, the Colombo Electoral District (which contains the Kotte Polling Division) has a Buddhist majority (70.2%) and a significant Muslim population (11.8%)

Religion in Kotte
1. Buddhist (77.1%)
2. Roman Catholic (7.30%)
3. Muslim (6.30%)
4. Other Christian (4.70%)
5. Hindu (4.50%)
6. Other (0.10%)
