= Gothamipura Grama Niladhari Division =

Gothamipura
- Grama Niladhari Division
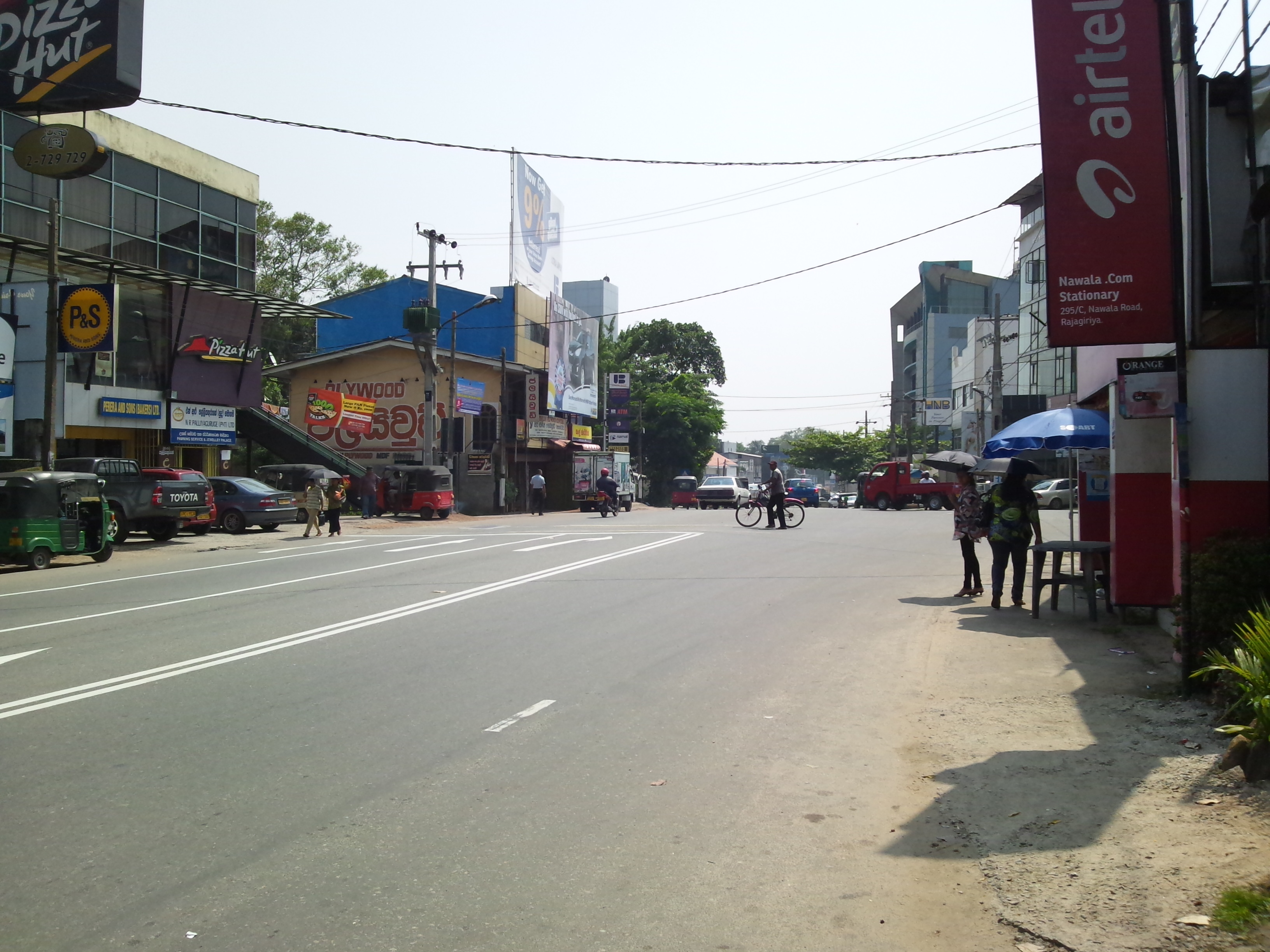
- Nawala is located within, nearby or associated with the Gothamipura Grama Niladhari Division
- Interactive map of Gothamipura
- Coordinates: 6.908363°N 79.883448°E
- Country: Sri Lanka
- Province: Western Province
- District: Colombo District
- Divisional Secretariat: Thimbirigasyaya Divisional Secretariat
- Electoral District: Colombo Electoral District
- Polling Division: Colombo East Polling Division

Area
  - Total: 1.25 km^{2} (0.48 sq mi)
- Elevation: 12 m (39 ft)

Population (2012)
  - Total: 6,498
  - Density: 5,198/km^{2} (13,460/sq mi)
- ISO 3166 code: LK-1127050

Gothamipura

Gothamipura Grama Niladhari Division is a Grama Niladhari Division of the Thimbirigasyaya Divisional Secretariat of Colombo District of Western Province, Sri Lanka.

Devi Balika Vidyalaya, Western Hospital, Royal Colombo Golf Club, Japanese School in Colombo, Sri Jayawardenepura Kotte, Siege of Kotte (1557–58), Kanatte Cemetery, British School in Colombo, Welikada and Nawala are located within, nearby or associated with Gothamipura.

Gothamipura is a surrounded by the Borella South, Narahenpita, Nawala West, Obesekarapura, Welikada North and Borella North Grama Niladhari Divisions.

== Demographics ==
=== Ethnicity ===
The Gothamipura Grama Niladhari Division has a Sinhalese majority (72.0%) and a significant Sri Lankan Tamil population (18.0%). In comparison, the Thimbirigasyaya Divisional Secretariat (which contains the Gothamipura Grama Niladhari Division) has a Sinhalese majority (52.8%), a significant Sri Lankan Tamil population (28.0%) and a significant Moor population (15.1%)

Ethnicity in Gothamipura
1. Sinhalese (72.0%)
2. Sri Lankan Tamil (18.0%)
3. Moor (7.40%)
4. Other (2.70%)

=== Religion ===
The Gothamipura Grama Niladhari Division has a Buddhist majority (65.6%) and a significant Hindu population (13.7%). In comparison, the Thimbirigasyaya Divisional Secretariat (which contains the Gothamipura Grama Niladhari Division) has a Buddhist plurality (47.9%), a significant Hindu population (22.5%) and a significant Muslim population (17.4%)

Religion in Gothamipura
1. Buddhist (65.6%)
2. Hindu (13.7%)
3. Muslim (8.20%)
4. Roman Catholic (8.10%)
5. Other Christian (4.20%)
6. Other (0.30%)

== Gallery ==
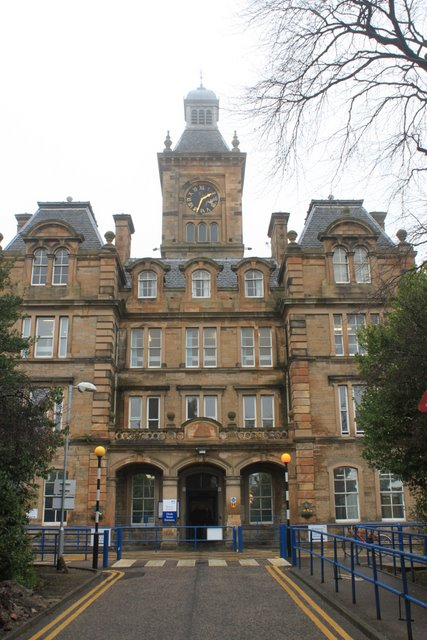
Western Hospital

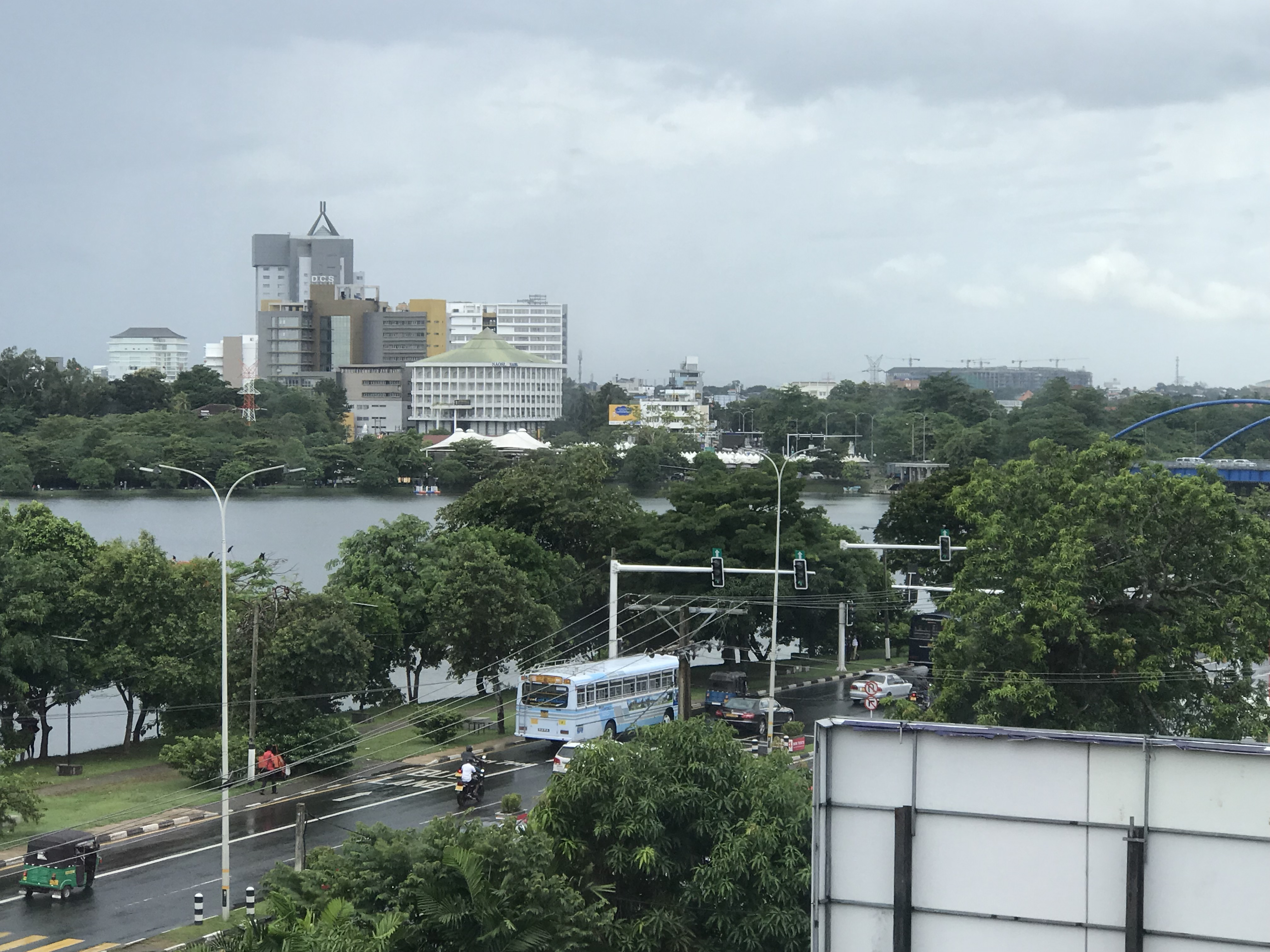
Sri Jayawardenepura Kotte

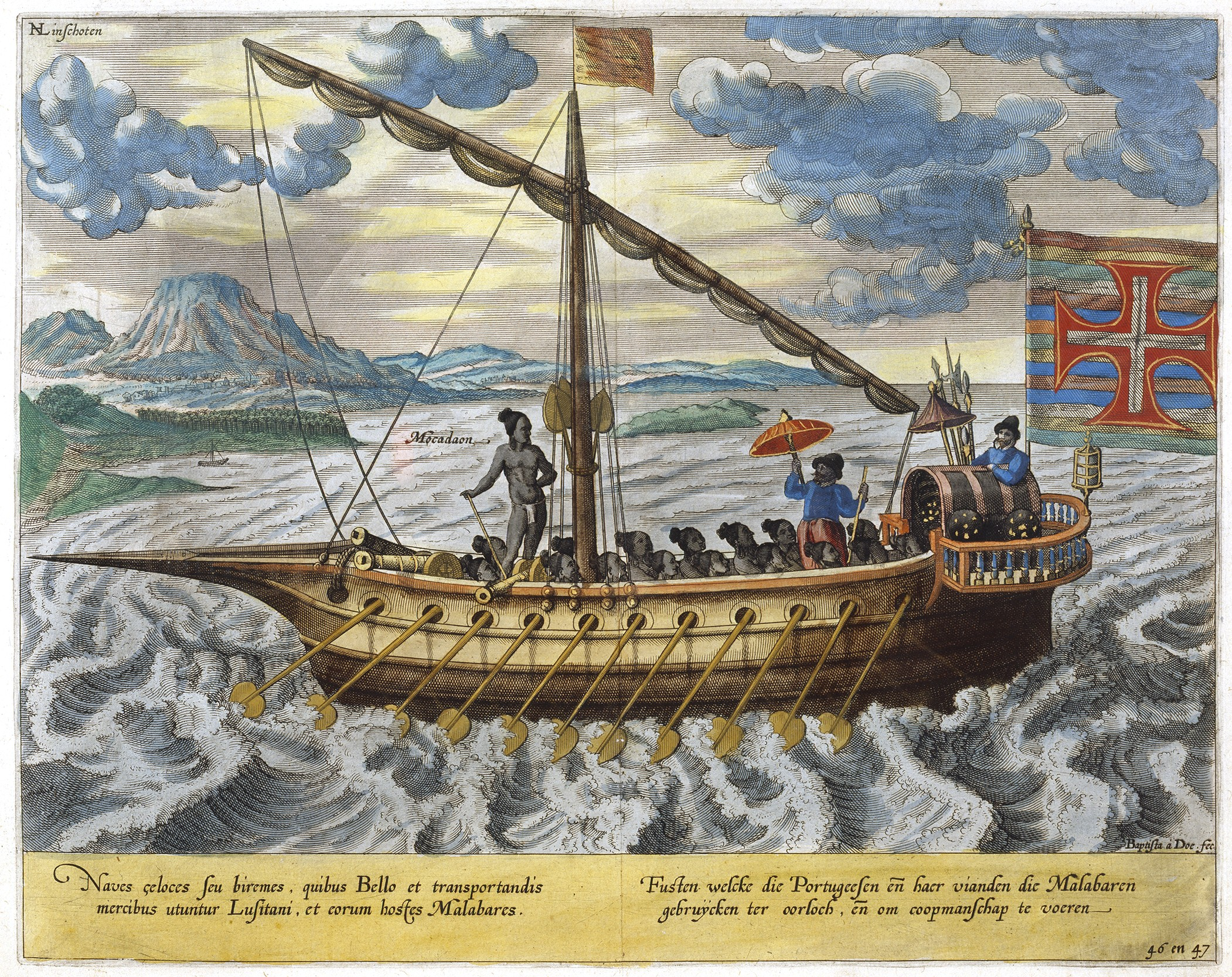
Siege of Kotte (1557–58)

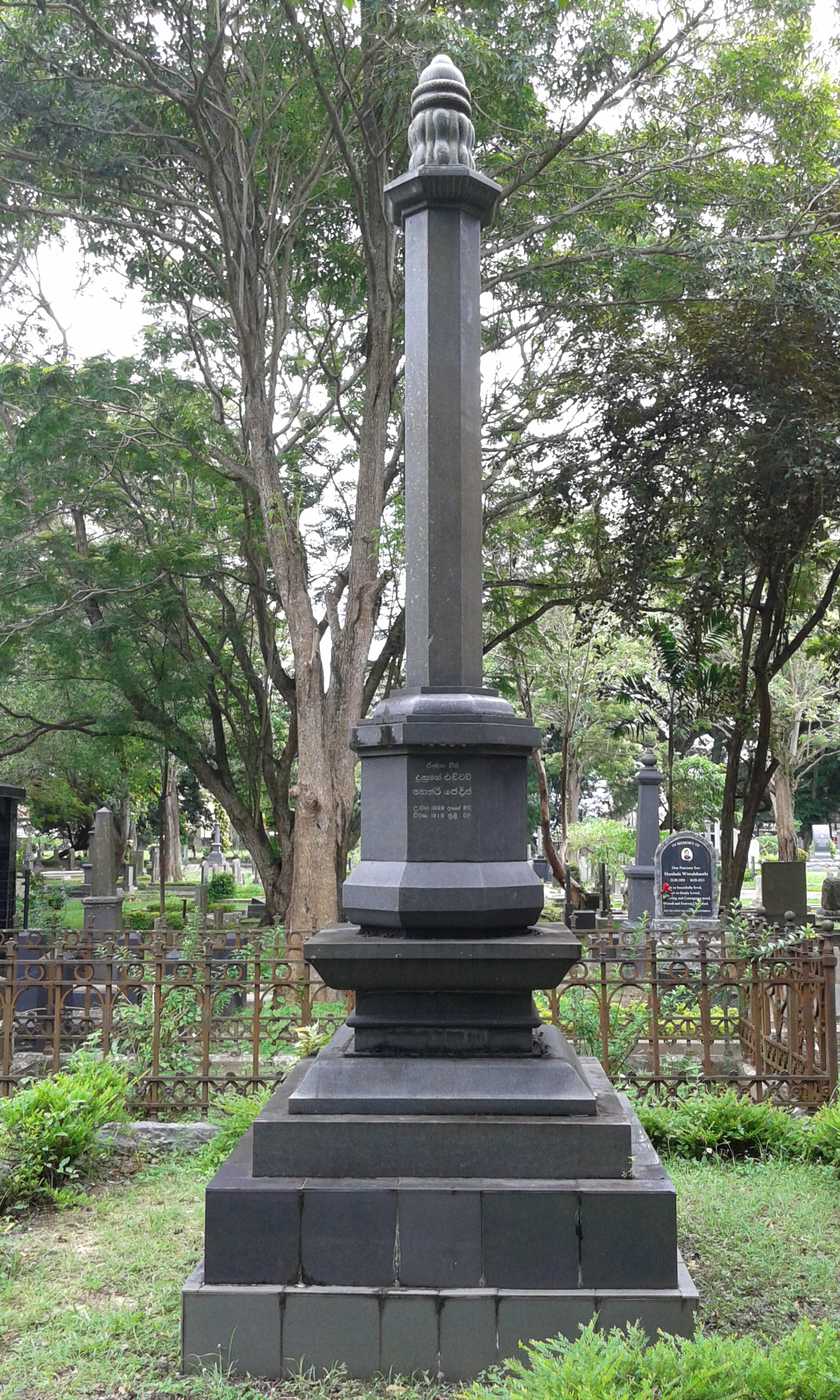
Kanatte Cemetery

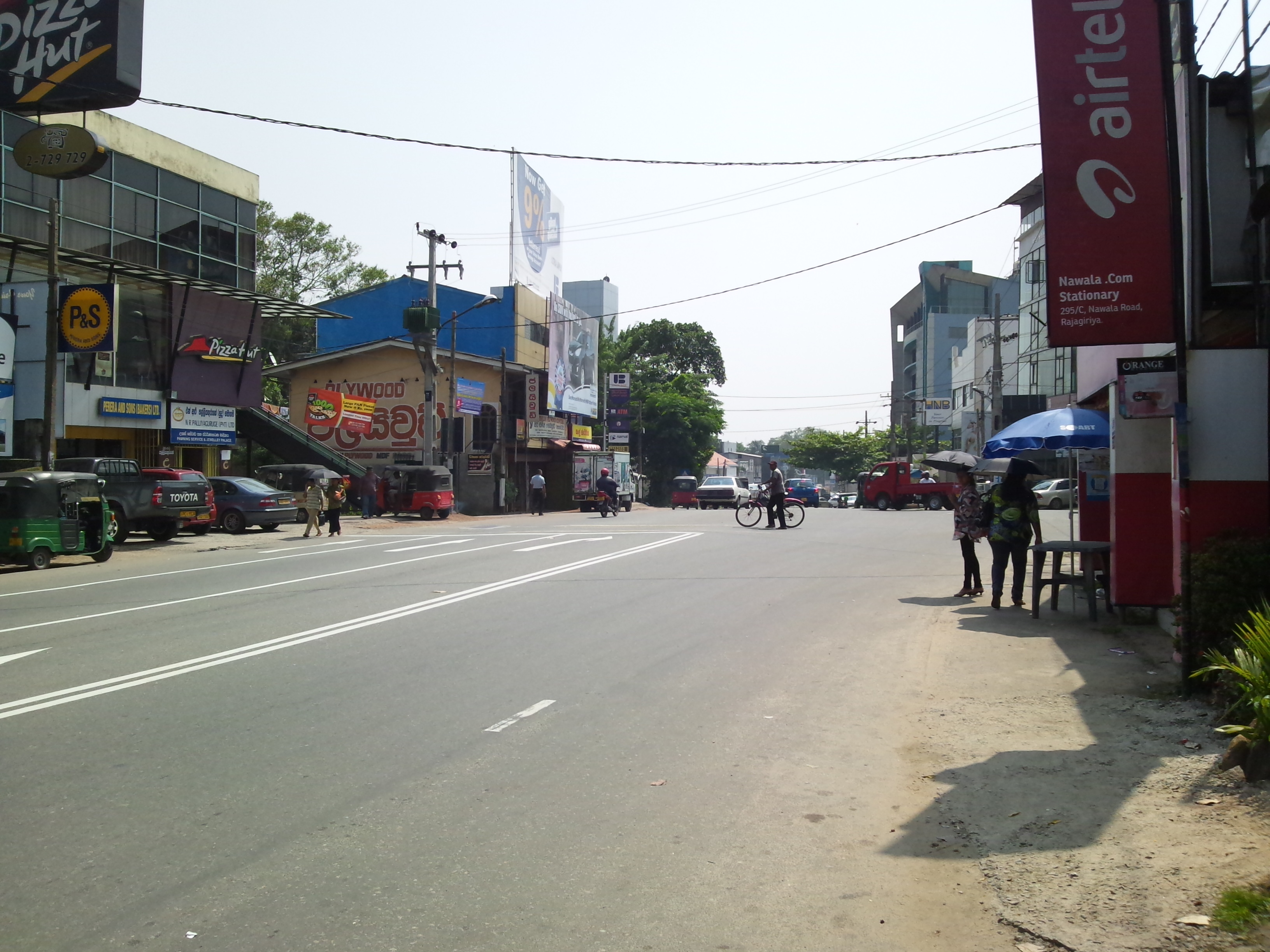
Nawala
