= Welikada North Grama Niladhari Division =

Welikada North
- Grama Niladhari Division
- Interactive map of Welikada North
- Coordinates: 6.906549°N 79.888752°E
- Country: Sri Lanka
- Province: Western Province
- District: Colombo District
- Divisional Secretariat: Sri Jayawardanapura Kotte Divisional Secretariat
- Electoral District: Colombo Electoral District
- Polling Division: Kotte Polling Division

Area
  - Total: 0.38 km^{2} (0.15 sq mi)
- Elevation: 49 m (161 ft)

Population (2012)
  - Total: 4,792
  - Density: 12,611/km^{2} (32,660/sq mi)
- ISO 3166 code: LK-1124025

Welikada North

Welikada North Grama Niladhari Division is a Grama Niladhari Division of the Sri Jayawardanapura Kotte Divisional Secretariat of Colombo District of Western Province, Sri Lanka. It has Grama Niladhari Division Code 514D.

Japanese School in Colombo, President's College, Sri Jayawardenapura Kotte, Sri Jayawardenepura Kotte, Siege of Kotte (1557–58), Election Commission of Sri Lanka, 1990 Suwa Seriya Foundation, Institute of Chemistry Ceylon, Western Hospital, Hewavitharana Maha Vidyalaya, Royal Colombo Golf Club and Devi Balika Vidyalaya are located within, nearby or associated with Welikada North.

Welikada North is a surrounded by the Rajagiriya, Koswatta, Nawala West, Obesekarapura, Gothamipura and Welikada West Grama Niladhari Divisions.

== Demographics ==
=== Ethnicity ===
The Welikada North Grama Niladhari Division has a Sinhalese majority (73.2%) and a significant Sri Lankan Tamil population (17.6%). In comparison, the Sri Jayawardanapura Kotte Divisional Secretariat (which contains the Welikada North Grama Niladhari Division) has a Sinhalese majority (84.8%)

Ethnicity in Welikada North
1. Sinhalese (73.2%)
2. Sri Lankan Tamil (17.6%)
3. Other (3.30%)
4. Moor (2.80%)
5. Indian Tamil (1.60%)
6. Other (1.60%)

=== Religion ===
The Welikada North Grama Niladhari Division has a Buddhist majority (68.9%) and a significant Other Christian population (10.0%). In comparison, the Sri Jayawardanapura Kotte Divisional Secretariat (which contains the Welikada North Grama Niladhari Division) has a Buddhist majority (77.1%)

Religion in Welikada North
1. Buddhist (68.9%)
2. Other Christian (10.0%)
3. Hindu (9.70%)
4. Roman Catholic (6.60%)
5. Muslim (4.00%)
6. Other (0.80%)

== Gallery ==
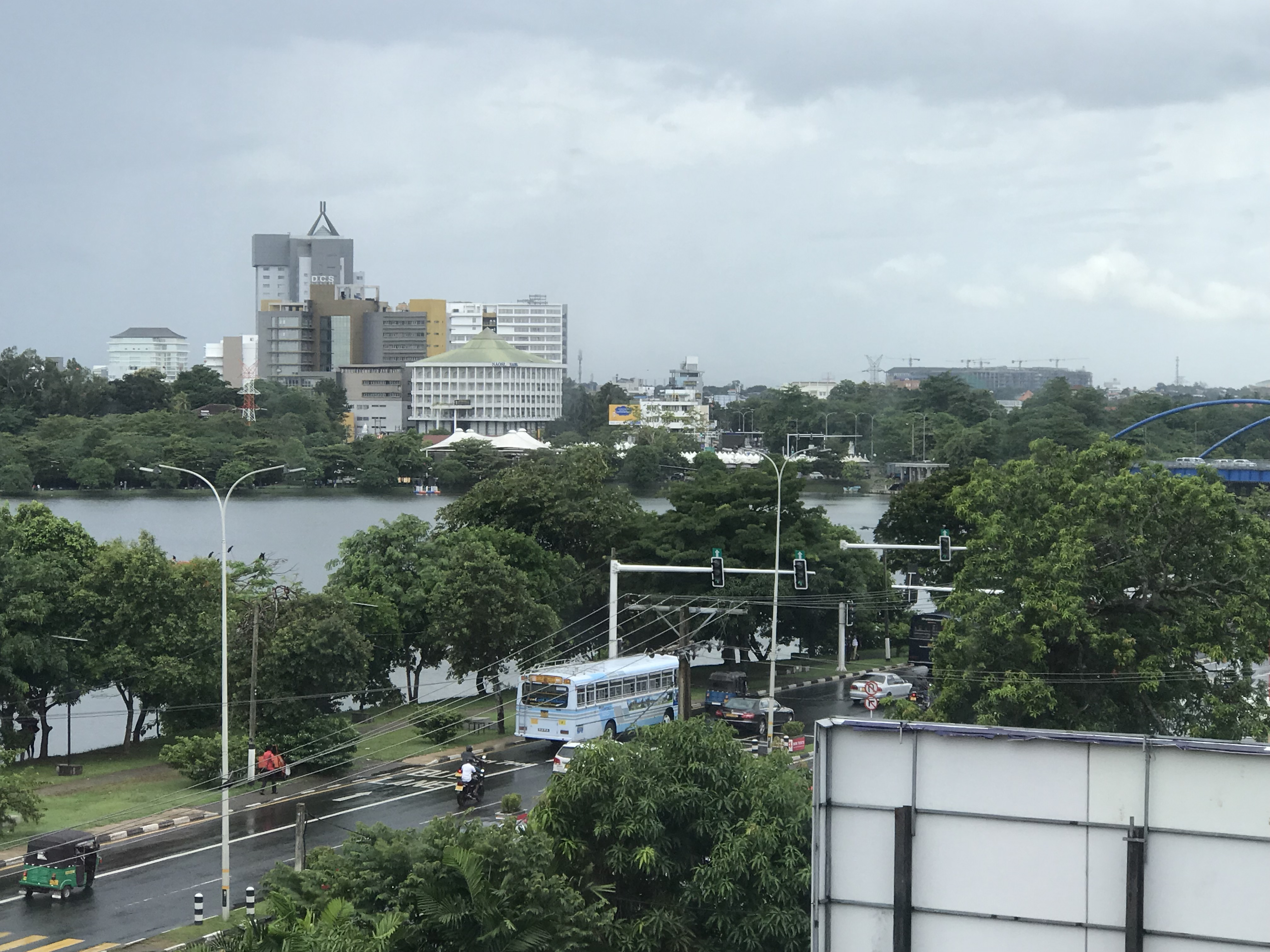
President's College, Sri Jayawardenapura Kotte

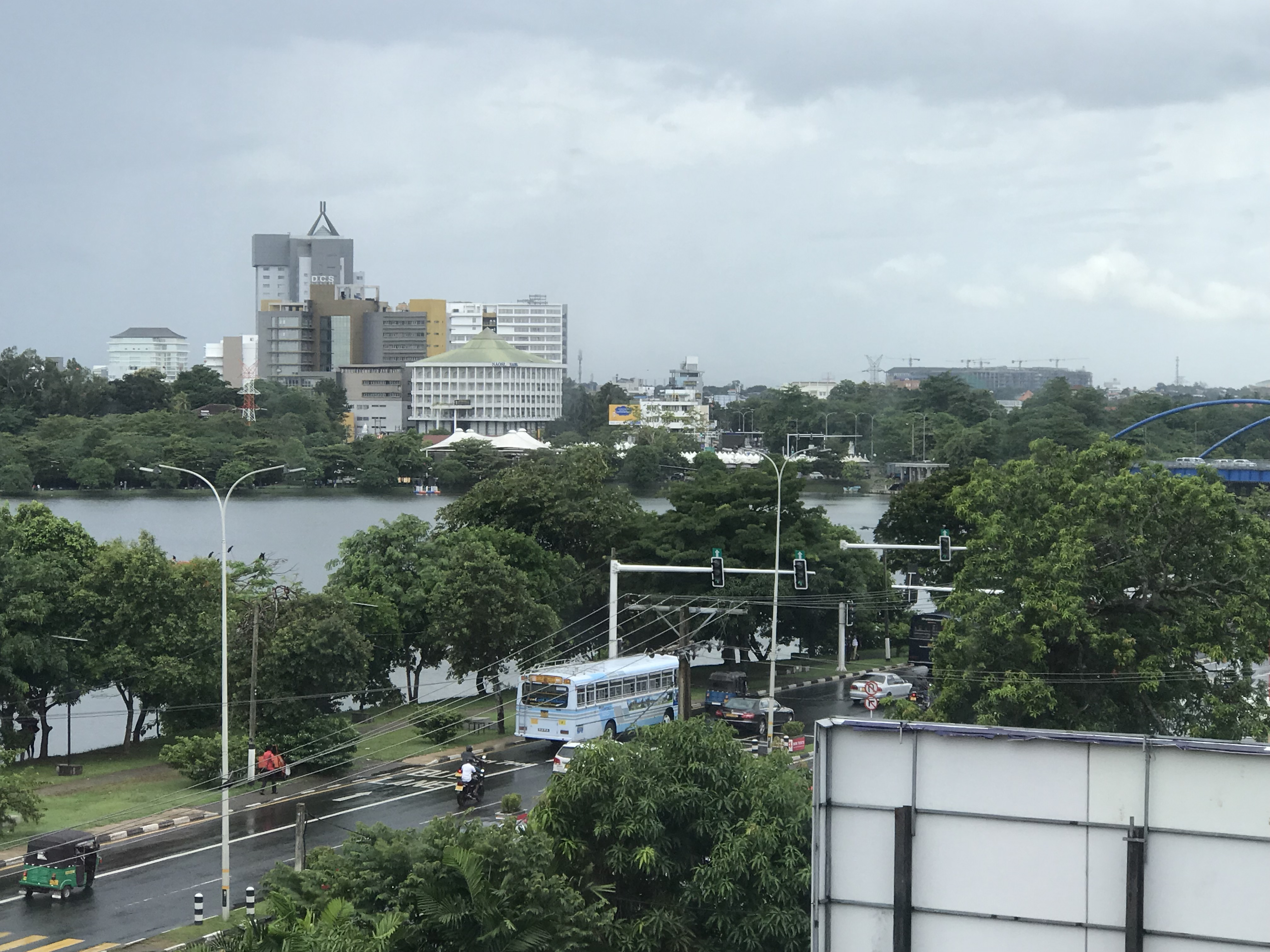
Sri Jayawardenepura Kotte

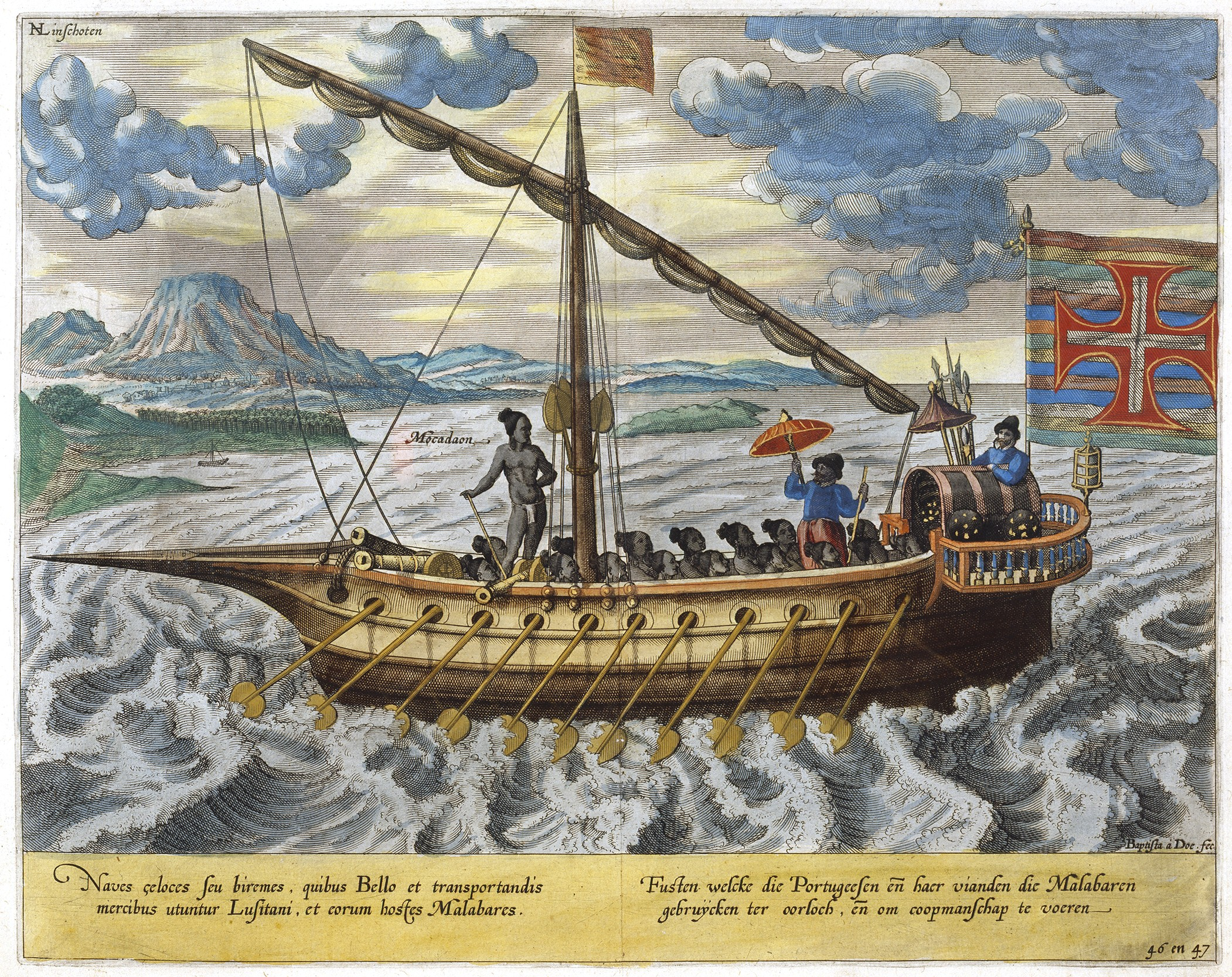

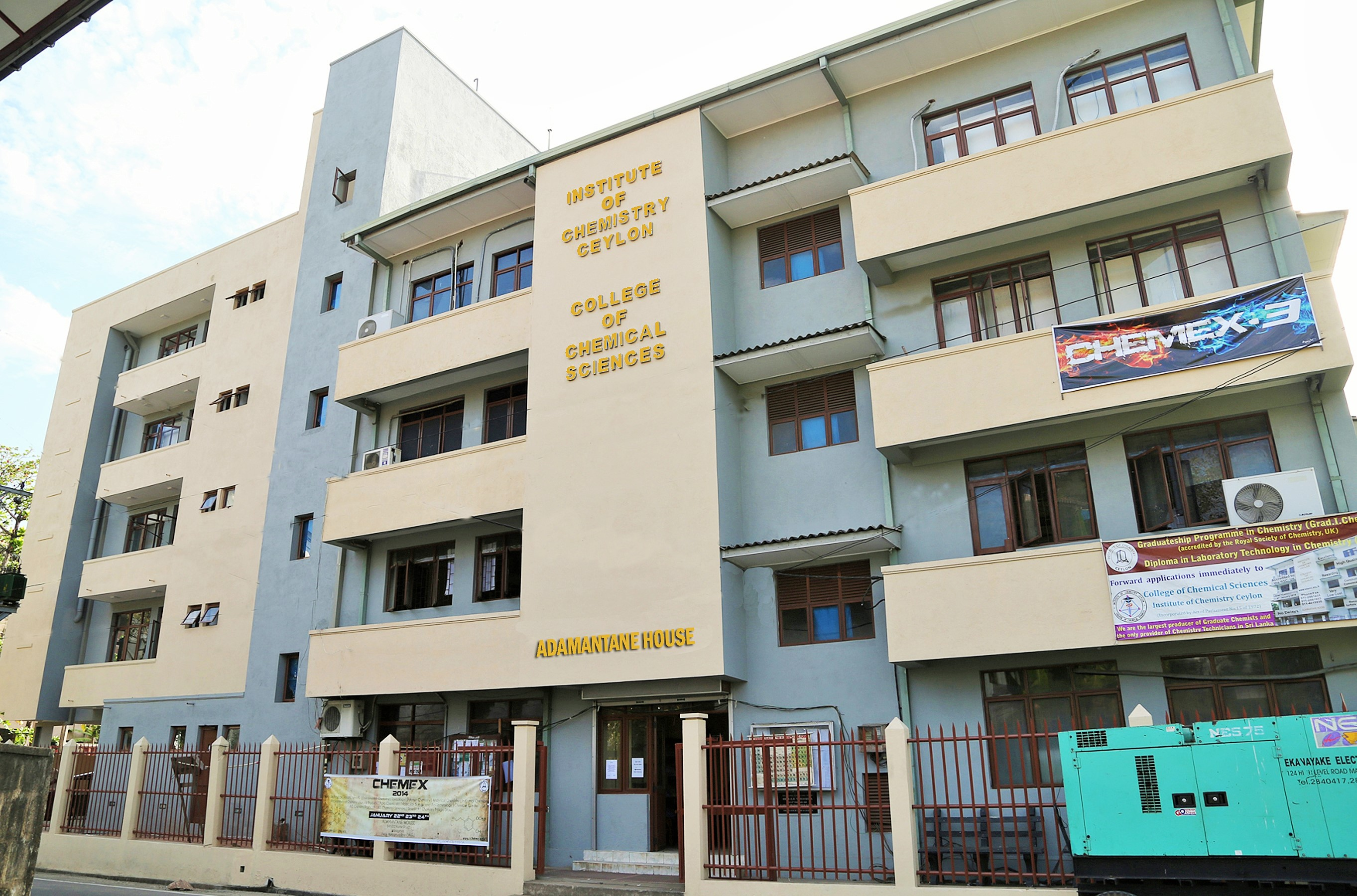
Institute of Chemistry Ceylon
