= Nawala West Grama Niladhari Division =

Nawala West
- Grama Niladhari Division
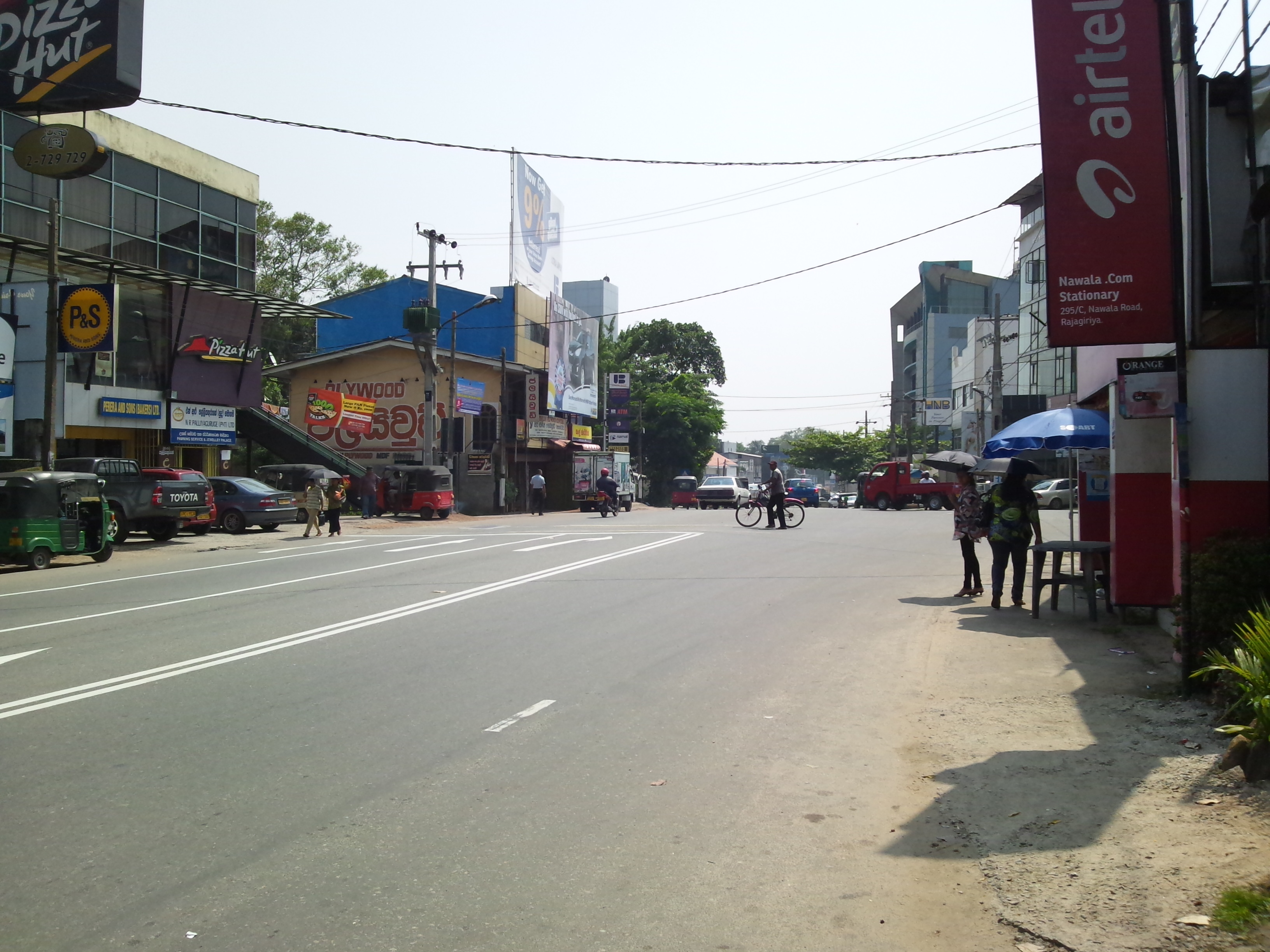
- Nawala is located within, nearby or associated with the Nawala West Grama Niladhari Division
- Interactive map of Nawala West
- Coordinates: 6.896015°N 79.887507°E
- Country: Sri Lanka
- Province: Western Province
- District: Colombo District
- Divisional Secretariat: Sri Jayawardanapura Kotte Divisional Secretariat
- Electoral District: Colombo Electoral District
- Polling Division: Kotte Polling Division

Area
  - Total: 1.44 km^{2} (0.56 sq mi)
- Elevation: 9 m (30 ft)

Population (2012)
  - Total: 4,059
  - Density: 2,819/km^{2} (7,300/sq mi)
- ISO 3166 code: LK-1124030

Nawala West

Nawala West Grama Niladhari Division is a Grama Niladhari Division of the Sri Jayawardanapura Kotte Divisional Secretariat of Colombo District of Western Province, Sri Lanka. It has Grama Niladhari Division Code 520.

Nawala are located within, nearby or associated with Nawala West.

Nawala West is a surrounded by the Koswatta, Nawala East, Narahenpita, Nugegoda West, Kirula, Gothamipura and Welikada North Grama Niladhari Divisions.

== Demographics ==
=== Ethnicity ===
The Nawala West Grama Niladhari Division has a Sinhalese majority (87.7%). In comparison, the Sri Jayawardanapura Kotte Divisional Secretariat (which contains the Nawala West Grama Niladhari Division) has a Sinhalese majority (84.8%)

Ethnicity in Nawala West
1. Sinhalese (87.7%)
2. Sri Lankan Tamil (5.40%)
3. Moor (2.30%)
4. Indian Tamil (1.70%)
5. Other (1.60%)
6. Burgher (1.40%)

=== Religion ===
The Nawala West Grama Niladhari Division has a Buddhist majority (77.7%). In comparison, the Sri Jayawardanapura Kotte Divisional Secretariat (which contains the Nawala West Grama Niladhari Division) has a Buddhist majority (77.1%)

Religion in Nawala West
1. Buddhist (77.7%)
2. Roman Catholic (9.70%)
3. Other Christian (4.90%)
4. Hindu (4.60%)
5. Muslim (3.10%)
6. Other (0.10%)

== Gallery ==
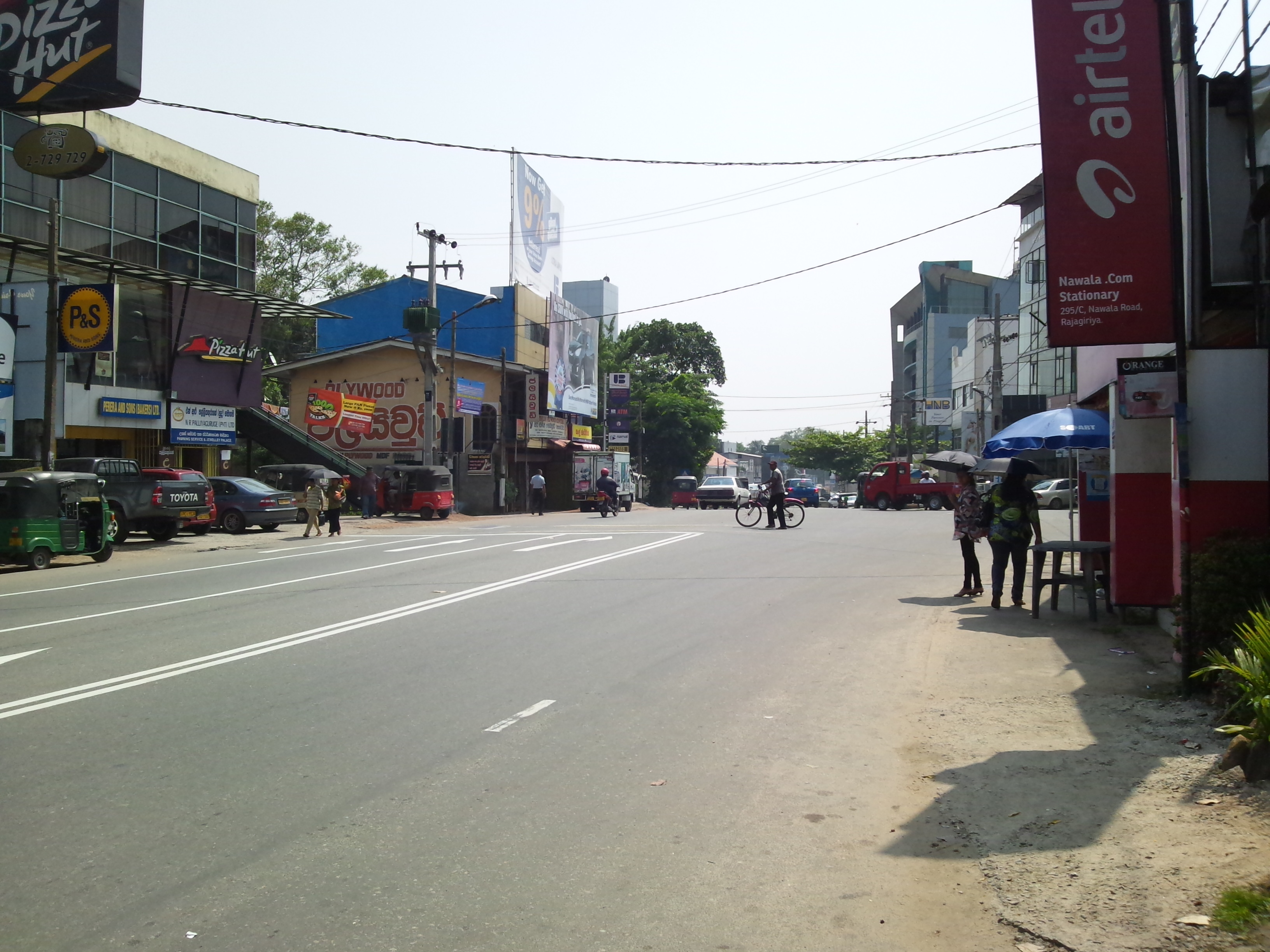
Nawala
