= Jezima Ismail =

Sri Lankan human rights activist and educationist

- Born: 1935 (age 90–91); Sainthamaruthu, Kalmunai, Ampara
- Education: St. Bridget's Convent, Colombo
- Alma mater: University of Peradeniya; University of Ceylon
- Occupations: social activist, broadcaster, educationist
- Spouse: Mahroof Ismail
- Awards: Deshabandu (1989)

Deshabandu Jezima Ismail (born 1935) is a Sri Lankan educator, broadcaster and social activist who has also served as an advocate for human rights. She has held several higher positions in fields such as education, human rights and broadcasting. She has also worked in several international organisations on human rights. She is the founder of the Muslim Women's Research and Action Forum (MWRAF), and the founder and president of the Sri Lanka Muslim Women's Conference (SLMWC). Additionally, she has served as vice chancellor of the South Eastern University of Sri Lanka, chairperson of People's Action for Free and Fair Elections (PAFFREL), principal of Muslim Ladies College Colombo, and as a teacher at the Devi Balika Vidyalaya.

Jezima has notably addressed some of the nation's most critical issues including development of youth, women's rights, peace and democracy. In 1989, she was awarded the title of Deshabandu by the Sri Lankan government, which is the third highest national honour in Sri Lanka. Jezima Ismail is considered as one of inspirational and greatest women among the Islamic community for her immense services towards the society.

== Early life and Education. ==
Jezima Ismail was born in 1935 in the village of Sainthamaruthu, a village which is about 2 and half miles away from Kalmunai, Ampara district. Her father was an irrigation engineer, her mother was a homemaker and her grandfather served as a trustee of a mosque. Her mother's side of the family was heavily involved in local politics and during election times, her mother worked as a polling agent. Ismail has fond memories of growing up in her village where she attended Carmel Convent School. Influenced by the vibrant culture, traditional music, and colorful attire of this backdrop, she developed a passion for the arts from a young age. Despite familial pressures towards a teaching career, she fondly recalls, "I loved music, dancing, and drama. If I had my way I would have been a singer or dancer."

Ismail came from a conservative family, but her father encouraged her to pursue education. Her father played a pivotal role in shaping her journey as an educator, fostering her interests in the arts, education, and extracurricular activities. His support and encouragement profoundly influenced Jezima Ismail's educational policies, inspiring her to prioritize holistic learning experiences in her later endeavors. She received her primary and secondary education at the St Bridget's Convent, Colombo. However, with the outbreak of the Sri Lankan civil war, she transferred to St Vincent's Girls High School, Batticaloa.

She attended the University of Peradeniya and graduated at the age of 20 in 1955, after which she pursued a career in education. Jezima Ismail pursued her Master of Arts in education from McGill University in 1966 and later obtained a Diploma in Teaching English as a Foreign Language (TEFL) from the University of Sydney in 1972.

== Career ==
After graduating at the University of Ceylon in 1955, she started to work in several fields as diverse as education, human rights and broadcasting. She joined the staff of Devi Balika Maha Vidyalaya under Principal Dr. Wimala de Silva's guidance. Later, she went to Canada and obtained her master's degree in education from the McGill University and completed her postgraduate diploma at the University of Sydney, Australia.

Jezima has taught education in few schools over 32 years and has served as the Principal of Muslim Ladies College, Colombo for 13 years from 1975 to 1988.

In 1980, she became the first woman to be appointed as the head of the Sri Lanka Broadcasting Corporation and has worked as a broadcaster for the SLBC. Jezima Ismail was appointed as one of the members of the committee by the then Sri Lankan president, Mahinda Rajapakse to study and respond to the reports related to the Mullivaikkal Hospital bombings in 2009. She is also the founder of Sri Lanka Muslim Women's Conference (SLMWC) and has served as the former vice chancellor of the Eastern University. She too served as the chairperson of People's Action for Free and Fair Elections (PAFFREL)

== Personal life ==
Jezima Ismail was married to Mahroof Ismail, a well known Sri Lankan professor. Mahroof Ismail died on 13 June 2016 at the age of 85.
