= Wimala de Silva =

Sri Lankan educationist, founder of Devi Balika Vidyalaya

- Born: 2 June 1920; Negombo, Western Province, Sri Lanka
- Died: 15 April 2007 (aged 86)
- Education: University of London; University of Ceylon; University of Sri Jayawardenepura
- Occupations: social activist, educationist
- Known for: first Sri Lankan female University chancellor, founding principal of Devi Balika Vidyalaya
- Spouse: Luxman de Silva
- Awards: Deshabandu (1986)

Deshabandu Wimala de Silva (2 June 1920 – 15 April 2007) was a prominent Sri Lankan educationist and social activist. She was a former chancellor of the University of Sri Jayawardenepura and founding principal of Devi Balika Vidyalaya, which is now one of the leading national schools in Sri Lanka in terms of academic achievement. During her lifetime, she was widely known for her research and efforts on raising issues and concerns regarding the gender inequality in Sri Lanka.

== Career ==
She graduated from the University of Ceylon in 1942 at the age of 22 and won scholarship for postgraduate studies at the Institute of Education in London. In the same institute, she obtained her Teacher's Diploma in 1949.

Wimala founded the Devi Balika Vidyalaya at the age of 32 in 1953 and served as the head principal of the school for over ten years. She initiated it as a government collegiate school, which was the first school to be introduced in Sri Lanka as a government collegiate school. During her tenure as the founding principal of Devi Balika Vidyalaya, the school became one of the important leading education institutes in the country. She also notably worked with prominent human rights activist Jezima Ismail who also served as a teacher at the Devi Balika Vidyalaya.

She also served as President of the Sri Lanka Federation of University Women on three different time periods. In 1980, she became the first Sri Lankan to be elected to the Council of the International Federation of University Women. She was appointed as the chancellor of University of Sri Jayawardenapura in 1983 and became Sri Lanka's first female university chancellor. She took charge as university chancellor in 1984 and served in the position until 1989.

She was honoured with the national prestigious title of Deshabandu by the Government of Sri Lanka in 1986 for her key services and contributions to the development of national education. In 1998, she also received Zonta Award from the Zonta International.
