= Mullivaikkal Hospital bombings =

Mullivaikkal Hospital bombing
- Part of Sri Lankan Civil War
- Mullaitivu district shown within Sri Lanka
- Location: 9°18′36″N 80°47′14″E; Mullivaikal, Mullaitivu District, Sri Lanka
- Date: 23 April through 12 May 2009
- Attack type: Artillery fire, and aerial attack
- Weapons: Artillery, aircraft fire
- Deaths: >100
- Injuries: >100
- Perpetrators: Sri Lankan Airforce and Sri Lankan army

Mullivaikal Hospital was a makeshift hospital located in the Safe Zone in northern Sri Lanka. An alleged series of shellings and aerial attacks began on 23 April 2009 when the Mullivaikal Hospital was hit by three artillery shells. It continued on 28 and 29 April when the Mullivaikkal Primary Health Center was hit multiple times over two days with six killed and many injured including one medical staffer. On the 29th and the 30th the Mullivaikal Hospital was again hit multiple times with nine more killed and fifteen injured. There were two attacks against the Mullivaikal Hospital on 2 May, one at 9 a.m. and a second at 10.30 a.m. resulting in sixty-eight killed and eighty-seven wounded, including medical staffers. On the morning of 12 May 2009 it was hit by an artillery mortar, killing at least forty-nine patients and injuring more than fifty others. All of these attacks were allegedly by the Sri Lankan Army; however, the Sri Lankan Government denied the allegation stating there is no evidence.

At the time of the last bombing, Red Cross was scheduled to ship around 2,000 of the patients out of the Safe Zone over the next couple of days, according to Tamilnet.

== Background and investigations ==
Human Rights Watch accuses the Sri Lankan military of shelling hospitals in the Safe Zone indiscriminately with artillery and attacking them aerially beginning with the Mullaitivu General Hospital in December 2008 and including at least eight other hospitals. Human Rights Watch argues that these attacks constitute war crimes. They've also said that the hospitals are marked. United States government photographs taken at the time show the markings.

In 2009, following the end of the Tamil uprising, the U.S. Department of State issued a "Report to Congress on Incidents during the Recent Conflict in Sri Lanka". The president of Sri Lanka, Mahinda Rajapaksa appointed a committee to study and respond to that report. The committee members were Chairman D.S. Wijesinghe PC, Nihal Jayamannne PC, C. R. De Silva PC, Mano Ramanathan, Jezima Ismail and Anura Meddegoda. The secretary of the committee was S.M. Samarakoon. The committee interviewed numerous parties including high-ranking officers of the armed forces and medical officers who had been attached to Puthukkudiyiruppu, Mullivaikkal, and other hospitals during the latter stages of the conflict. Although the committee received several extensions, no report was issued.

The April 2011 United Nations Report of the Secretary-General's Panel of Experts on Accountability in Sri Lanka found that the allegations that the Sri Lankan military shelled hospitals were credible. They specifically found that the Mullivaikkal Hospital was marked as such and that it was shelled by the Sri Lankan Army.

In May 2010 President Rajapaksa appointed a Lessons Learnt and Reconciliation Commission to deal with the aftermath of the war. The commission received testimony about the shelling of the Mullivaikkal Hospital. In their final report they concluded in general that:

9.10 The Commission is satisfied, on careful consideration of all the circumstances, that shells had fallen on hospitals causing damage and resulting in casualties. However, the material placed before the Commission points to a somewhat confused picture as to the precise nature of events, from the perspective of time, exact location, and direction of fire.

— LLRC Report,

However, the Commission did not specifically identify incidents in its conclusion and concluded that non-availability of primary evidence of a technical nature and also the fact that supportive civilian evidence is equivocal in nature and does not warrant a definitive conclusion that one Party or the other was responsible for the shelling. There were no recommendations to the military as a result of the hospital shellings. The Commission concluded: "On consideration of all facts and circumstances before it, the commission concludes that the security forces had not deliberately targeted the civilians in the NFZs, although civilian casualties had occurred in the course of crossfire." They went on to say: "The Commission after most careful consideration of all aspects, is of the view that the Security Forces were confronted with an unprecedented situation when no other choice was possible and all "feasible precautions" that were practicable in the circumstances had been taken.

In April 2012, the U.S. State Department Office of Global Criminal Justice (GCJ), led by Ambassador-at-Large Stephen Rapp, submitted a report on Sri Lanka to the U.S Congress that diplomatically praised the LLRC report, but asked for the Government of Sri Lanka to establish an independent mechanism to investigate the credible allegations that the LLRC failed to address. The GCJ indicated that the allegations regarding the shelling of known hospitals implicate grave breaches of International humanitarian law and merit further investigation.

== See also ==
- List of attacks on civilians attributed to Sri Lankan government forces
- Kunduz hospital airstrike
