= Siege of Kotte (1557–1558) =

1557 siege

- Part of the Sinhalese–Portuguese War
Date	November 1557 – November 1558
Location	Sri Jayawardenapura Kotte, Kingdom of Kotte 06°54′39″N 79°53′16.21″E
Result	Portuguese victory

Belligerents
Kingdom of Sitawaka	Portuguese Empire: Lascarins (local soldiers on the Portuguese side); Supported by: Kingdom of Kotte

Commanders and leaders
Mayadunne; Tikiri Bandara; Panapitiya Mudali	(Portuguese Empire) Afonso Pereira de Lacerda (Portuguese Empire) Diogo de Melo Coutinho (Portuguese Empire) Manuel de Castro (Portuguese Empire) Jorge de Melo (Portuguese Empire) Francisco Barreto

Strength
50,000 Sitawaka men	480 Portuguese, At least 9,000 Lascarins; 12 fustas Unknown number of reinforcements from Mannar

Casualties and losses
Low	Moderate

The siege of Kotte was an offensive which took place during the Sinhalese–Portuguese War between 1557 and 1558. A 50,000-strong Sitawaka army led by King Mayadunne besieged Sri Jayawardenapura Kotte, the capital of Kotte Kingdom, for 12 months against a combined force of Portuguese and Lascarins led by Captain-major Dom Afonso Pereira de Lacerda. After receiving reinforcements from Mannar, Portuguese made a sally and succeeded in forcing the besiegers to withdraw. This siege marked the beginning of a series of battles between Portuguese and Sitawaka forces, and ultimately ended as Portuguese abandoned Sri Jayawardenapura Kotte in 1565.

== Background ==
The Portuguese arrived in Sri Lanka in 1505 and established trade relations with kingdom of Kotte. They erected a fortress in Colombo and garrisoned it.

In 1521, Kotte king Vijayabahu VII's three sons mutinied against their father. They killed him and divided the kingdom among themselves, leading to the events which known as “Spoiling of Vijayabahu” (Vijayaba Kollaya). Eldest son Buvanekabahu VII received Kotte with the sea board and ruled with the title of emperor. Second son received the principality of Raigama and ruled under the name of King Raigam Bandara. The youngest son, who was the leader of “spoiling”, received the kingdom of Sitawaka and ruled as King Mayadunne.

With Raigam Bandara's death in 1538 Mayadunne annexed the principality of Raigama and invaded Kotte. Buvanekabahu VII with the help of the Portuguese defeated Mayadunne's invading forces, eventually paving the way to an uneasy peace between the two kingdoms.

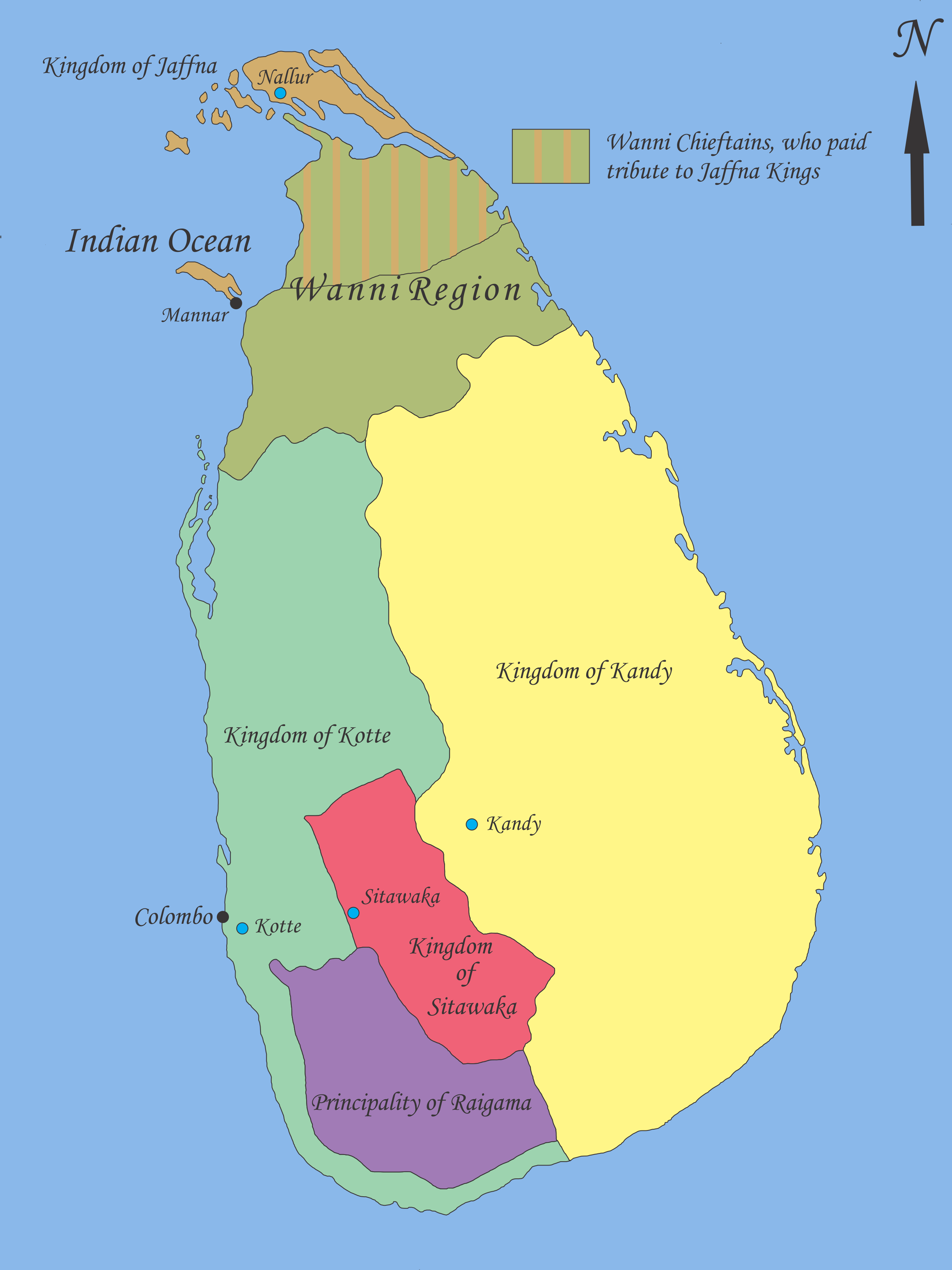
Sri Lanka geopolitics – after "Spoiling of Vijayabahu"

The Portuguese wanted to conduct a full-scale offensive against Sitawaka and neutralize the threat exerted by King Mayadunne. But King Bhuvanekabahu VII did not support their cause; he only wanted Portuguese help for defensive purposes. After Bhuvanekabahu's death in 1551, Dharmapala came to the Kotte throne; he was more or less a puppet king under Portuguese influence. He became a vassal of the Portuguese king and converted to Christianity in 1557. This led to an open discontent among Kotte inhabitants and the Portuguese sternly repressed the mutiny by arresting and hanging many participants including 30 Buddhist monks.

After consulting with his council, Mayadunne proclaimed himself heir to the throne of Kotte and appealed to the subjects of Kotte to join his cause. Many chieftains and their followers answered and deserted to Sitawaka. Mayadunne taking the initiative rallied his forces to invade the Kingdom of Kotte.

== Opposing forces and the defenses of Sri Jayawardenapura Kotte ==
The Sitawaka army consisted of 50,000 men in 300 companies organised into three corps. First corps or the vanguard left Sitawaka on 10 November 1557 under the command of Tikiri Bandara (King mayadunne's son). The center led by Panapitiya Mudali marched out on 15 November. The rearguard under King Mayadunne left Sitawaka on 30 November 1557. These forces advanced slowly towards Sri Jayawardenapura Kotte, securing the supply routes and outposts on their way.

Sri Jayawardenapura Kotte (sometimes simply referred to as “Kotte”) was the capital of Kotte kingdom. It was a triangular elevated area of land with its apex at the north. On either side it was protected by Kolonnawa canal and its connecting streams, which were heavily infested with alligators. The area between the solid ground and the water was a marsh land which submerged after a moderate rain fall. Within lay the city and the palace defended by a rampart of laterite rock. All this area was known as Ethul Kotte (inner fortress).

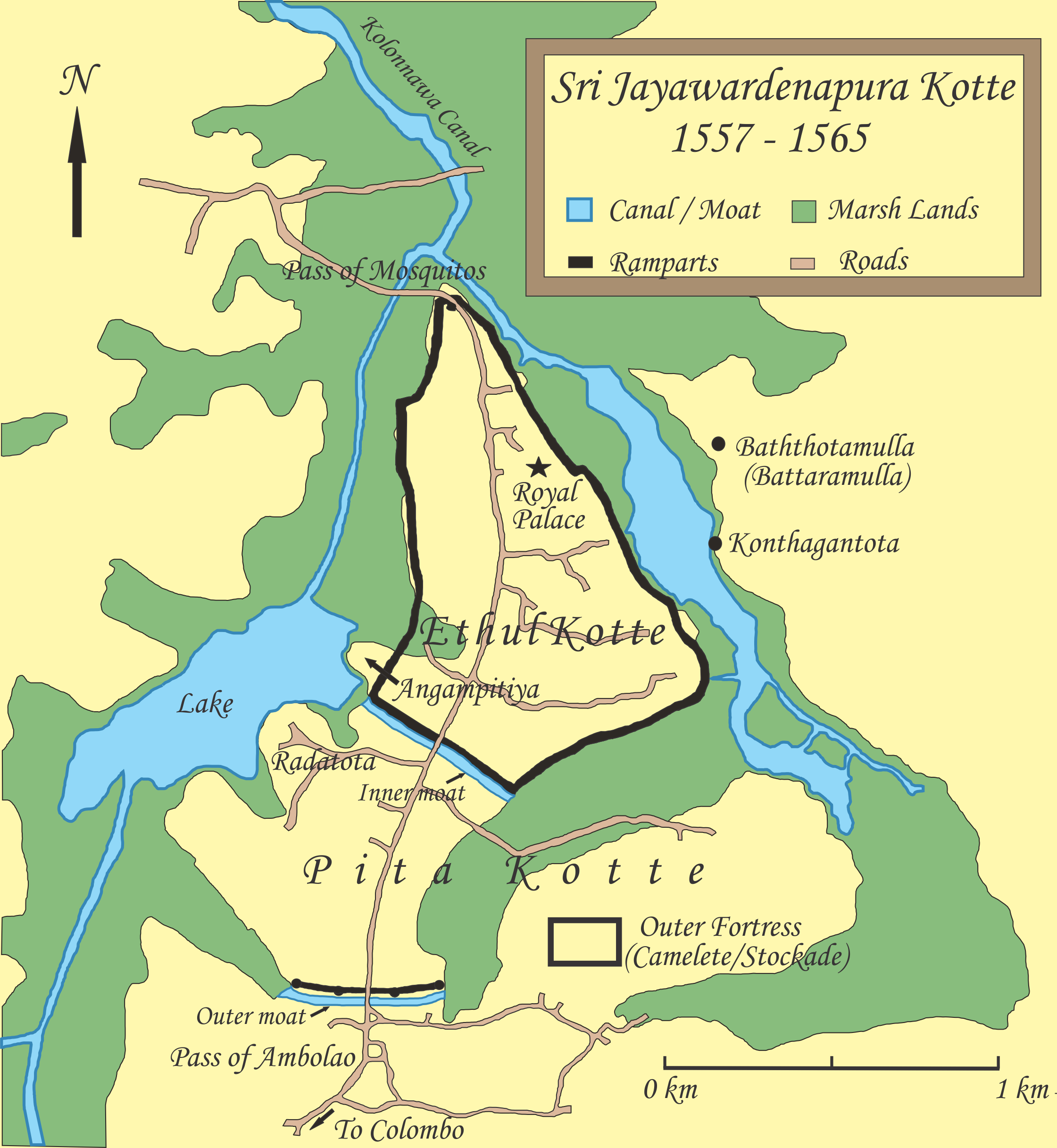
Map of Sri Jayawardenapura Kotte and its defenses

This triangular area connected to dry land at the base by a narrow isthmus and protected by a moat (inner moat). This narrow isthmus and the dry land outside the rampart was known as Pita Kotte. Pita Kotte's approaches were defended by a curtain and a moat (outer moat) with a drawbridge. Pass leading to the south was known as “pass of Ambalao” and was the main route to Colombo Fort.

Receiving the news of the invasion force, Dom Afonso Pereira de Lacerda, the Captain major of Portuguese Ceylon, arrived at Kotte with 300 Portuguese soldiers just arrived from Goa, increasing the total number of Portuguese soldiers to 480. In addition to the elite King's Guard, at least 9,000 Lascarins were stationed in Kotte under the command of Francisco Barreto (Tammita Suriya Bandara – Uncle of King Dharmapala).

Afonso Pereira rapidly organized Kotte's defenses with the help of the remaining inhabitants. He stationed 20 Portuguese and 200 Lascarins at the "pass of Ambolao", another 40 Portuguese and 400 Lascarins at the "pass of Mosquitos" and 80 Portuguese and 800 Lascarins manned various defenses in Pita Kotte. Afonso Pereira placed 12 fustas armed with falcons in the lake. They were fast ships with a shallow draft and were capable of patrolling the canals.

By the end of November 1557, the Sitawaka army approached Sri Jayawardenapura Kotte. Tikiri Bandara's corps took positions to the south and west of the city with their main encampment just west to the lake. Panapitiya Mudali covered the rest of the area and King Mayadunne's corps remained as a reserve force providing reinforcement when necessary.

== Early encounters ==
As soon as they positioned themselves, the Sitawaka army mounted their first attack. Under the cover of darkness, a force led by Tikiri Bandara tried to approach the Ethul Kotte ramparts from the west. But cannon fire from falcons of fustas scattered them. Taking advantage of the situation, a force of 8,000 Lascarins under Francisco Barreto (Tammita Suriya Bandara) with 80 Portuguese led by Diogo de Melo mounted a counterattack in the dawn. This unexpected attack met with little resistance and a company under Rui Dias Pereira managed to break into the encampment of Tikiri Bandara. They captured the standard of Tikiri Bandara and almost managed to kill him; but were forced to withdraw as Rui Dias Pereira was mortally wounded by an arrow to the neck. By the time Francisco Barreto retreated back to Kotte, they had killed many Sitawaka men with little casualties to their own.

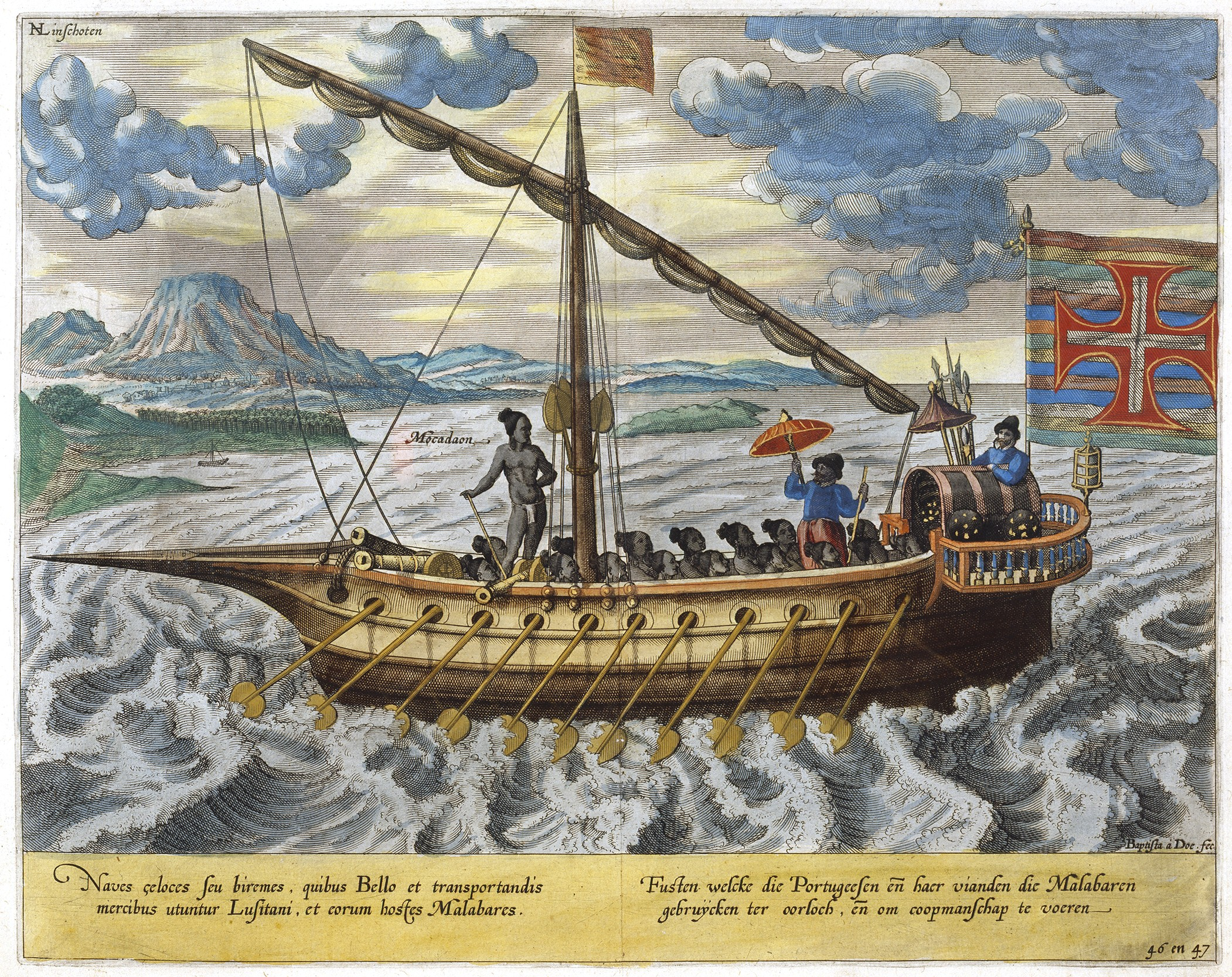
Portuguese fusta – a light and fast ship with shallow draft, powered by both oars and sail

As the siege progressed, a party of 3 fustas under António Espínola, Fernão de Castro, and Diogo Juzarte raided several villages along the Diyawanna canal which were occupied by Sitawaka forces. But counterattacks from Panapitiya Mudali forced them to retreat back.

Throughout the next few months, Afonso Pereira de Lacerda used numerous raiding sorties and skirmishes to prevent Sitawaka forces from approaching the ramparts. But despite all his efforts, Sitawaka forces managed to maintain a strict blockade cutting off all the provisions. By August 1558 provisions failed, and according to Portuguese sources, they were forced to eat even the foulest things. After discussing with his men, Afonso Pereira decided to sally out.

== Battle by the Lake ==
This battle was fought at a location just west of the lake, but the exact site has yet to be identified. The Portuguese attack force consisted of 3 formations; vanguard, center, and rearguard. Each formation had 100 Portuguese soldiers and 3,000 Lascarins, except the rearguard which had slightly lesser number of Portuguese soldiers. Afonso Pereira de Lacerda led the vanguard, D Manuel de Castro the center, and Diogo de Melo Coutinho the rearguard.

The attack force sallied out on 20 August (Day of Saint Bernard) at the dawn watch, but could not achieve the intended surprise. Tikiri Bandara, realizing thePortuguese were trying to break through, threw out his musket men and artillery to cover the main body of his vanguard. Meanwhile, Panapitiya Mudali and King Mayadunne learnt about the attack and rushed to the scene with reinforcements.

Advancing Portuguese forces attacked the Sitawaka musket men and light artillery with the assistance of grapeshot from two falcons and caused many casualties. The Sitawaka advance guard withdrew, and satisfied with the success, the Portuguese vanguard and center charged across the field chasing them down. This charge disrupted the cohesion of the Portuguese and opened up a gap between them and the rearguard. Suddenly the Portuguese vanguard and center found themselves surrounded by Tikiri Bandara's men. Realizing the gravity of the situation, Afonso Pereira de Lacerda urgently sent two messages requesting help from the rearguard.

Meanwhile, Panapitya Mudali arrived with reinforcements. He forced himself in to the gap of the Portuguese army and attacked the rearguard led by Diogo de Melo Coutinho, preventing him from assisting the main body. But Diogo de Melo skillfully managed to break through the Panapitiya Mudali's force and killed him in the ensuing battle. Once they saw their leader's death, Panapitiya mudali's force abandoned the fight and ran back. Seeing the fleeing enemy, a 3,000 strong Lascarin force chased them down, but they ran into an ambush laid by King Mayadunne's forces. Many were killed and the rest were routed. Only a few managed to join back with Diogo de Melo.

Diogo de Melo now found himself with a depleted force of Portuguese and without the majority of the Lascarins. Yet he managed to break through the lines of Sitawaka men and open up a pass. What remained of the Portuguese vanguard and center withdrew through this gap towards the lake. Fustas covered the retreat with grapeshots which fell among both Sitawaka men and Lascarins who were fighting in the rear. Sitawaka archers retaliated, killing 14 Portuguese soldiers with arrows. However, heavy fire from fustas stopped the Sitawaka pursuit and the Portuguese withdrew back to Kotte.

== August – November 1558 ==
Failure at the “Battle by the Lake” and the deaths of many Portuguese soldiers soon spread discontent in the Portuguese camp. Portuguese captains openly questioned the leadership of the captain major with mutinous demonstrations. Afonso Pereira was determined to punish the ringleader, but the inquiries revealed he was none other than Diogo de Melo Coutinho, the hero of the “Battle by the Lake”. So intending for a peaceful solution, he encountered Diogo de Melo publicly and questioned him “Diogo de Melo what do you mean? I own I owe you my life, and since you have given it to me and saved me from so many enemies, don’t be the occasion of my losing it.” These words released the tension between them and the demonstrations ended with Diogo de Melo publicly accepting and praising the leadership of Afonso Pereira.

Meanwhile, news of the defeat reached Mannar with rumors of Afonso Pereira's death. The commander of Mannar garrison was Captain Jorge de Melo (nicknamed the First). Without any means to verify the truth of the rumors he rallied all the forces he could muster and arrived at Kotte. They managed to break through the blockade and enter the city to the great relief of Afonso Pereira.

== Battle for the Pass of Ambolao and end of the Siege ==
By November 1558 Afonso Pereira de Lacerda, now strengthened by the new reinforcements, decided to lead another attack against the Sitawaka forces. This time he chose to attack the “Pass of Ambolao” defended by Tikiri Bandara's men. The Portuguese attack force consisted of 370 Portuguese soldiers and 7,000 Lascarins. They were arranged in 3 formations: advance guard (dianteyra) led by Diogo de Melo Coutinho, vanguard by Jorge de Melo, and rear guard commanded by Afonso Pereira himself. (Due to paucity of soldiers, during campaigns in Sri Lanka Portuguese commanders usually used these alternated military terms instead of usual vanguard, center (batatha), and rearguard respectively.)

The Sitawaka army spotted the Portuguese movements in advance and they were ready by the time the attack began. After a short skirmish both sides charged and the battle reduced to an intense melee. Gradually the Portuguese managed to obtain the upper hand and Tikiri Bandara's units withdrew from the field.

Mayadunne realised that he was unable maintain an effective blockade without controlling the Pass of Ambolao and decided to abandon the siege. The main Sitawaka force withdrew back to Kaduwela while Mayadunnne with his forces withdrew to the grand stockade of Mapitigama.

== Aftermath ==
Commemorating this victory, a procession was held in Kotte displaying the standards of Saint Francis, Saint James, and Saint Bernard, with other religious standards. Meanwhile, the Portuguese started to lay plans to invade Sitawaka, but Afonso Pereira de Lacerda fell severely ill with chronic malaria. So the Portuguese viceroy at Goa sent a veteran commander named D. Jorge de Menezes (nicknamed Baroche) to take over from Afonso Pereira. He took over the office in May 1559 and immediately marched out to capture the grand stockade of Mapitigama which eventually resulted in Battle of Mulleriyawa.

== See also ==
- History of Sri Lanka
- Kingdom of Kotte
- Saddharmarathnakaraya
