= President's College, Sri Jayawardenepura Kotte =

President’s College

Location
- Sri Jayawardenapura Kotte; Sri Lanka; 6°54′24.81″N 79°53′33.51″E

Information
- Type: National
- Motto: Pali: විද්‍යා දදාති විනයං (Education Gives Humility)
- Established: 4 February 1978; 48 years ago
- Founder: Mrs. Soma Munindradasa
- Principal: Mrs.H.B.s. Rupasinghe
- Staff: 400
- Grades: 1 - 13
- Gender: Boys
- Enrollment: 6500+
- Colours: Maroon and Gold
- Song: Sri Jaya Janapathi
- Website: presidentscollege.lk

The President's College is a boys' national school in Sri Jayawardenapura Kotte, Sri Lanka. Founded on 4 February 1978, its inauguration was the first official act carried out by President J. R. Jayewardene.

== History ==
The college began with two grades- Lower Kindergarten and Year 1, with four teachers and 351 students. The school had its first sports meet in 1980, and began offering Advanced Level classes in 1988.

Initially located at Torrington Place, Colombo 7, the school was shifted to its current premises on 21 June 1983. It was given National School status in 1999. In 2019 February a 25-meter eight lane swimming pool complex was declared open by Minister of Education Akila Viraj Kariyawasam and Minister of Economic Reforms and Public Distribution Dr. Harsha de Silva.

== Houses ==
The school has a house system comprising four houses. They compete each year to win the Inter-house sports competitions.

- – Gunathilake
- – Soulbury
- – Jayawardene
- – Gopallawa

== Sports ==
- The president versus Asoka cricket match is played between president's College, Rajagiriya and Asoka College Colombo since 2008. Battle of Rathran.

year	Result	Ref.
2008	Won	—N/a
2009	Won	—N/a
2010	Won	—N/a
2011	Won	—N/a
2012	Won	—N/a
2013	Won	—N/a
2014	Won	—N/a
2015	Won	—N/a
2016	Won	—N/a
2017	Won	—N/a
2018	Won	
2019	Lost	—N/a
2020	Postponed due to COVID-19	—N/a
2021	Postponed due to COVID-19	—N/a
2022	Lost	—N/a
2023	Lost	—N/a
2024	Lost	—N/a
2025	Won	—N/a
2026	Won	—N/a

=== Rugby ===
Rugby was introduced to college in 2006. The college currently competes in Division 1segmant ( c )of the Dialog Schools Rugby League. The school annually competes for the Maroon shield Challenge Trophy rugby encounter with Asoka College, Colombo

- President vs Asoka Maroon shield

Main article: Maroon shield Challenge Trophy The annual ragby match between prasident College rajagiriya and Asoka College, colombo is played for the Maroon shield.Aesthetic

- Cricket
- Badminton
- swimming
- football
- rugby
- hockey
- boxing
- basketball
- volleyball
- baseball
- Elle
- Air rifle shooting
- Scrabble
- tennis
- rowing
- squash
- water polo
- chess
- gymnastics
- western cadet Band
- Cadet Platoon
- Martial Arts-karate, wushu
- General Knowledge Club
- Prefects' guild
- Eastern Cadet Band

== Notable alumni ==
Name	Notability
Shashika Siriwardene	former cricketer who captained the Sri Lanka men's national cricket team
Shehan Ambepitiya	athlete who won 3 gold medals at the 2008 Commonwealth Youth Games
