= Colombo East Polling Division =

Colombo East
- Polling Division
- Coordinates: 6.887472°N 79.876029°E
- Country: Sri Lanka
- Province: Western Province, Sri Lanka
- Electoral District: Colombo Electoral District

Area
  - Total: 9.13 km^{2} (3.53 sq mi)

Population (2012)
  - Total: 93,260
  - Density: 10,215/km^{2} (26,460/sq mi)
- ISO 3166 code: EC-01D

The Colombo East Polling Division is a Polling Division in the Colombo Electoral District, in the Western Province, Sri Lanka.

== Presidential Election Results ==
=== Summary ===
The winner of Colombo East has matched the final country result 4 out of 8 times.

Year	Colombo East	Colombo Electoral District	MAE %	Sri Lanka	MAE %
2019	NDF	SLPP	14.04%	SLPP	13.11%
2015	NDF	NDF	11.46%	NDF	15.78%
2010	NDF	UPFA	12.94%	UPFA	18.04%
2005	UNP	UNP	11.21%	UPFA	13.64%
1999	UNP	PA	7.33%	PA	8.92%
1994	PA	PA	0.89%	PA	1.55%
1988	UNP	UNP	3.13%	UNP	1.87%
1982	UNP	UNP	3.21%	UNP	6.90%
Matches/Mean MAE	4/8	7/8	8.03%	8/8	9.98%

=== 2019 Sri Lankan Presidential Election ===
Party	Colombo East		Colombo Electoral District		Sri Lanka	
Party	Votes	%	Votes	%	Votes	%
NDF	28,599	55.81%	559,921	40.92%	5,564,239	41.99%
SLPP	19,619	38.28%	727,713	53.19%	6,924,255	52.25%
NMPP	1,750	3.41%	53,803	3.93%	418,553	3.16%
Other Parties (with < 1%)	706	1.38%	16,405	1.20%	295,797	2.23%
NPP	571	1.11%	10,335	0.76%	49,655	0.37%
Valid Votes	51,245	98.60%	1,368,177	98.89%	13,252,499	98.99%
Rejected Votes	727	1.40%	15,333	1.11%	135,452	1.01%
Total Polled	51,972	79.47%	1,383,510	82.82%	13,387,951	83.71%
Registered Electors	65,398		1,670,403		15,992,568	

=== 2015 Sri Lankan Presidential Election ===
Party	Colombo East		Colombo Electoral District		Sri Lanka	
Party	Votes	%	Votes	%	Votes	%
NDF	35,167	67.45%	725,073	55.93%	6,217,162	51.28%
UPFA	16,601	31.84%	562,614	43.40%	5,768,090	47.58%
Other Parties (with < 1%)	369	0.71%	8,673	0.67%	138,200	1.14%
Valid Votes	52,137	98.73%	1,296,360	98.83%	12,123,452	98.85%
Rejected Votes	668	1.27%	15,334	1.17%	140,925	1.15%
Total Polled	52,805	78.88%	1,311,694	81.34%	12,264,377	78.69%
Registered Electors	66,941		1,612,660		15,585,942	

=== 2010 Sri Lankan Presidential Election ===
Party	Colombo East		Colombo Electoral District		Sri Lanka	
Party	Votes	%	Votes	%	Votes	%
NDF	28,334	58.67%	533,022	45.90%	4,173,185	40.15%
UPFA	19,107	39.56%	614,740	52.93%	6,015,934	57.88%
Other Parties (with < 1%)	854	1.77%	13,620	1.17%	204,494	1.97%
Valid Votes	48,295	98.57%	1,161,382	99.03%	10,393,613	99.03%
Rejected Votes	699	1.43%	11,394	0.97%	101,838	0.97%
Total Polled	48,994	71.38%	1,172,776	76.09%	10,495,451	66.70%
Registered Electors	68,643		1,541,242		15,734,587	

=== 2005 Sri Lankan Presidential Election ===
Party	Colombo East		Colombo Electoral District		Sri Lanka	
Party	Votes	%	Votes	%	Votes	%
UNP	28,832	62.40%	569,627	51.12%	4,706,366	48.43%
UPFA	16,919	36.62%	534,431	47.96%	4,887,152	50.29%
Other Parties (with < 1%)	455	0.98%	10,192	0.91%	123,521	1.27%
Valid Votes	46,206	98.52%	1,114,250	98.86%	9,717,039	98.88%
Rejected Votes	694	1.48%	12,879	1.14%	109,869	1.12%
Total Polled	46,900	71.35%	1,127,129	75.85%	9,826,908	69.51%
Registered Electors	65,732		1,486,021		14,136,979	

=== 1999 Sri Lankan Presidential Election ===
Party	Colombo East		Colombo Electoral District		Sri Lanka	
Party	Votes	%	Votes	%	Votes	%
UNP	22,281	52.09%	425,185	44.08%	3,602,748	42.71%
PA	17,777	41.56%	474,310	49.18%	4,312,157	51.12%
JVP	1,486	3.47%	44,009	4.56%	343,927	4.08%
Other Parties (with < 1%)	1,226	2.87%	21,030	2.18%	176,679	2.09%
Valid Votes	42,770	96.86%	964,534	97.06%	8,435,754	97.69%
Rejected Votes	1,388	3.14%	29,197	2.94%	199,536	2.31%
Total Polled	44,158	68.58%	993,731	73.39%	8,635,290	72.17%
Registered Electors	64,386		1,354,025		11,965,536	

=== 1994 Sri Lankan Presidential Election ===
Party	Colombo East		Colombo Electoral District		Sri Lanka	
Party	Votes	%	Votes	%	Votes	%
PA	23,867	63.79%	557,708	64.82%	4,709,205	62.28%
UNP	12,806	34.23%	288,741	33.56%	2,715,283	35.91%
Other Parties (with < 1%)	742	1.98%	13,937	1.62%	137,040	1.81%
Valid Votes	37,415	97.80%	860,386	98.17%	7,561,526	98.03%
Rejected Votes	843	2.20%	16,060	1.83%	151,706	1.97%
Total Polled	38,258	67.06%	876,446	69.59%	7,713,232	69.12%
Registered Electors	57,049		1,259,484		11,158,880	

=== 1988 Sri Lankan Presidential Election ===
Party	Colombo East		Colombo Electoral District		Sri Lanka	
Party	Votes	%	Votes	%	Votes	%
UNP	16,480	51.09%	361,337	49.14%	2,569,199	50.43%
SLFP	13,477	41.78%	339,958	46.23%	2,289,857	44.95%
SLMP	2,298	7.12%	34,020	4.63%	235,701	4.63%
Valid Votes	32,255	97.98%	735,315	98.49%	5,094,754	98.24%
Rejected Votes	666	2.02%	11,295	1.51%	91,499	1.76%
Total Polled	32,921	64.27%	746,610	67.53%	5,186,256	55.87%
Registered Electors	51,225		1,105,583		9,283,143	

=== 1982 Sri Lankan Presidential Election ===
Party	Colombo East		Colombo Electoral District		Sri Lanka	
Party	Votes	%	Votes	%	Votes	%
UNP	21,367	60.57%	436,290	57.86%	3,450,815	52.93%
SLFP	11,268	31.94%	274,476	36.40%	2,546,348	39.05%
JVP	1,352	3.83%	28,580	3.79%	273,428	4.19%
LSSP	828	2.35%	9,655	1.28%	58,531	0.90%
Other Parties (with < 1%)	462	1.31%	5,030	0.67%	190,929	2.93%
Valid Votes	35,277	98.81%	754,031	98.95%	6,520,156	98.78%
Rejected Votes	426	1.19%	7,990	1.05%	80,470	1.22%
Total Polled	35,703	73.22%	762,021	76.88%	6,600,626	80.15%
Registered Electors	48,760		991,194		8,235,358	

== Parliamentary Election Results ==
=== Summary ===
The winner of Colombo East has matched the final country result 4 out of 7 times. Hence, Colombo East is a Weak Bellwether for Parliamentary Elections.

Year	Colombo East	Colombo Electoral District	MAE %	Sri Lanka	MAE %
2015	UNP	UNP	11.50%	UNP	15.72%
2010	UNP	UPFA	11.74%	UPFA	19.97%
2004	UNP	UNP	9.59%	UPFA	14.96%
2001	UNP	UNP	6.34%	UNP	10.13%
2000	UNP	UNP	5.99%	PA	10.43%
1994	PA	PA	4.01%	PA	1.98%
1989	UNP	UNP	3.58%	UNP	4.64%
Matches/Mean MAE	4/7	5/7	7.54%	7/7	11.12%

=== 2020 Sri Lankan Parliamentary Election ===
Party	Colombo East		Colombo Electoral District		Sri Lanka	
Party	Votes	%	Votes	%	Votes	%
SJB	20,538	46.58%	387,145	32.73%	2,771,984	23.9%
SLPFA	18,007	40.84%	674,603	57.04%	6,853,693	59.09%
JJB	2,595	5.89%	67,600	5.72%	445,958	3.84%
UNP	1,869	4.24%	30,875	2.61%	249,435	2.15%
Other Parties (with < 1%)	1,083	2.45%	22,553	1.9%	1,227,859	11.02%
Valid Votes	44,092	65.57%	1,182,776	69.2%	11,598,936	71.32%
Rejected Votes	3,371	5.01%	81,034	4.74%	744,373	4.58%
Total Polled	47,463	70.59%	1,263,810	73.94%	12,343,309	75.89%
Registered Electors	67,241		1,709,209		16,263,885	

=== 2015 Sri Lankan Parliamentary Election ===
Party	Colombo East		Colombo Electoral District		Sri Lanka	
Party	Votes	%	Votes	%	Votes	%
UNP	31,450	65.52%	640,743	53.04%	5,098,916	45.77%
UPFA	12,917	26.91%	474,063	39.25%	4,732,664	42.48%
JVP	2,960	6.17%	81,391	6.74%	544,154	4.88%
Other Parties (with < 1%)	674	1.40%	11,752	0.97%	93,045	0.84%
Valid Votes	48,001	95.81%	1,207,949	96.46%	11,140,333	95.35%
Rejected Votes	2,043	4.08%	43,372	3.46%	516,926	4.42%
Total Polled	50,099	74.84%	1,252,271	78.93%	11,684,111	77.66%
Registered Electors	66,941		1,586,598		15,044,490	

=== 2010 Sri Lankan Parliamentary Election ===
Party	Colombo East		Colombo Electoral District		Sri Lanka	
Party	Votes	%	Votes	%	Votes	%
UNP	19,241	49.36%	339,750	36.19%	2,357,057	29.37%
UPFA	14,662	37.62%	480,896	51.23%	4,846,388	60.38%
DNA	4,608	11.82%	110,683	11.79%	441,251	5.50%
Other Parties (with < 1%)	467	1.20%	7,292	0.78%	48,240	0.60%
Valid Votes	38,978	93.79%	938,723	94.85%	8,026,322	96.03%
Rejected Votes	2,562	6.16%	50,354	5.09%	581,465	6.96%
Total Polled	41,558	60.54%	989,729	64.17%	8,358,246	59.29%
Registered Electors	68,643		1,542,457		14,097,690	

=== 2004 Sri Lankan Parliamentary Election ===
Party	Colombo East		Colombo Electoral District		Sri Lanka	
Party	Votes	%	Votes	%	Votes	%
UNP	23,739	52.09%	441,841	41.77%	3,486,792	37.73%
UPFA	12,141	26.64%	414,688	39.20%	4,223,126	45.70%
JHU	9,116	20.00%	190,618	18.02%	552,723	5.98%
Other Parties (with < 1%)	577	1.27%	10,713	1.01%	90,868	0.98%
Valid Votes	45,573	96.42%	1,057,860	96.47%	9,241,931	94.52%
Rejected Votes	1,689	3.57%	38,605	3.52%	534,452	5.47%
Total Polled	47,265	69.63%	1,096,571	74.71%	9,777,821	75.74%
Registered Electors	67,885		1,467,751		12,909,631	

=== 2001 Sri Lankan Parliamentary Election ===
Party	Colombo East		Colombo Electoral District		Sri Lanka	
Party	Votes	%	Votes	%	Votes	%
UNP	26,636	58.23%	546,417	51.62%	4,086,026	45.62%
PA	11,807	25.81%	353,401	33.39%	3,330,815	37.19%
JVP	3,613	7.90%	117,404	11.09%	815,353	9.10%
TULF	2,075	4.54%	12,696	1.20%	348,164	3.89%
SU	962	2.10%	16,970	1.60%	50,665	0.57%
Other Parties (with < 1%)	652	1.43%	11,593	1.10%	162,452	1.81%
Valid Votes	45,745	96.10%	1,058,481	96.28%	8,955,844	94.77%
Rejected Votes	1,855	3.90%	40,901	3.72%	494,009	5.23%
Total Polled	47,600	71.33%	1,099,382	76.31%	9,449,878	76.03%
Registered Electors	66,736		1,440,682		12,428,762	

=== 2000 Sri Lankan Parliamentary Election ===
Party	Colombo East		Colombo Electoral District		Sri Lanka	
Party	Votes	%	Votes	%	Votes	%
UNP	22,232	49.86%	440,684	43.45%	3,451,765	40.12%
PA	13,922	31.22%	394,146	38.86%	3,899,329	45.33%
SU	2,939	6.59%	49,671	4.90%	127,859	1.49%
JVP	2,844	6.38%	78,133	7.70%	518,725	6.03%
Other Parties (with < 1%)	1,193	2.68%	19,281	1.90%	162,201	1.89%
ACTC	927	2.08%	5,238	0.52%	27,289	0.32%
NUA	534	1.20%	27,067	2.67%	185,593	2.16%
Valid Votes	44,591	N/A	1,014,220	N/A	8,602,617	N/A

=== 1994 Sri Lankan Parliamentary Election ===
Party	Colombo East		Colombo Electoral District		Sri Lanka	
Party	Votes	%	Votes	%	Votes	%
PA	18,211	45.60%	469,642	50.94%	3,887,805	48.94%
UNP	17,858	44.72%	385,100	41.77%	3,498,370	44.04%
MEP	1,615	4.04%	42,734	4.64%	68,538	0.86%
IND1	1,593	3.99%	9,251	1.00%	48,199	0.61%
SLPF	493	1.23%	11,454	1.24%	90,078	1.13%
Other Parties (with < 1%)	163	0.41%	3,752	0.41%	3,796	0.05%
Valid Votes	39,933	96.11%	921,933	96.18%	7,943,688	95.20%
Rejected Votes	1,618	3.89%	36,635	3.82%	400,395	4.80%
Total Polled	41,551	72.83%	958,568	76.04%	8,344,095	74.75%
Registered Electors	57,049		1,260,686		11,163,064	

=== 1989 Sri Lankan Parliamentary Election ===
Party	Colombo East		Colombo Electoral District		Sri Lanka	
Party	Votes	%	Votes	%	Votes	%
UNP	17,908	56.48%	374,530	51.67%	2,838,005	50.71%
SLFP	8,654	27.29%	205,053	28.29%	1,785,369	31.90%
USA	2,482	7.83%	31,873	4.40%	141,983	2.54%
MEP	1,620	5.11%	76,966	10.62%	90,480	1.62%
SLMC	680	2.14%	29,308	4.04%	202,016	3.61%
ELJP	363	1.14%	7,112	0.98%	67,723	1.21%
Valid Votes	31,707	95.66%	724,842	95.36%	5,596,468	93.87%
Rejected Votes	1,439	4.34%	35,271	4.64%	365,563	6.13%
Total Polled	33,146	66.30%	760,113	69.87%	5,962,031	63.60%
Registered Electors	49,993		1,087,891		9,374,164	

== Demographics ==
=== Ethnicity ===
The Colombo East Polling Division has a Sinhalese majority (58.8%) and a significant Sri Lankan Tamil population (28.6%) . In comparison, the Colombo Electoral District (which contains the Colombo East Polling Division) has a Sinhalese majority (76.5%), a significant Moor population (10.7%) and a significant Sri Lankan Tamil population (10.1%)

Ethnicity in Colombo East
1. Sinhalese (58.8%)
2. Sri Lankan Tamil (28.6%)
3. Moor (8.90%)
4. Other (2.20%)
5. Indian Tamil (1.50%)

=== Religion ===
The Colombo East Polling Division has a Buddhist majority (54.1%), a significant Hindu population (23.3%) and a significant Muslim population (10.7%) . In comparison, the Colombo Electoral District (which contains the Colombo East Polling Division) has a Buddhist majority (70.2%) and a significant Muslim population (11.8%)

Religion in Colombo East
1. Buddhist (54.1%)
2. Hindu (23.3%)
3. Muslim (10.7%)
4. Roman Catholic (6.90%)
5. Other Christian (4.80%)
6. Other (0.20%)
