= Nawala =

Nawala නාවල நாவல
- Suburb
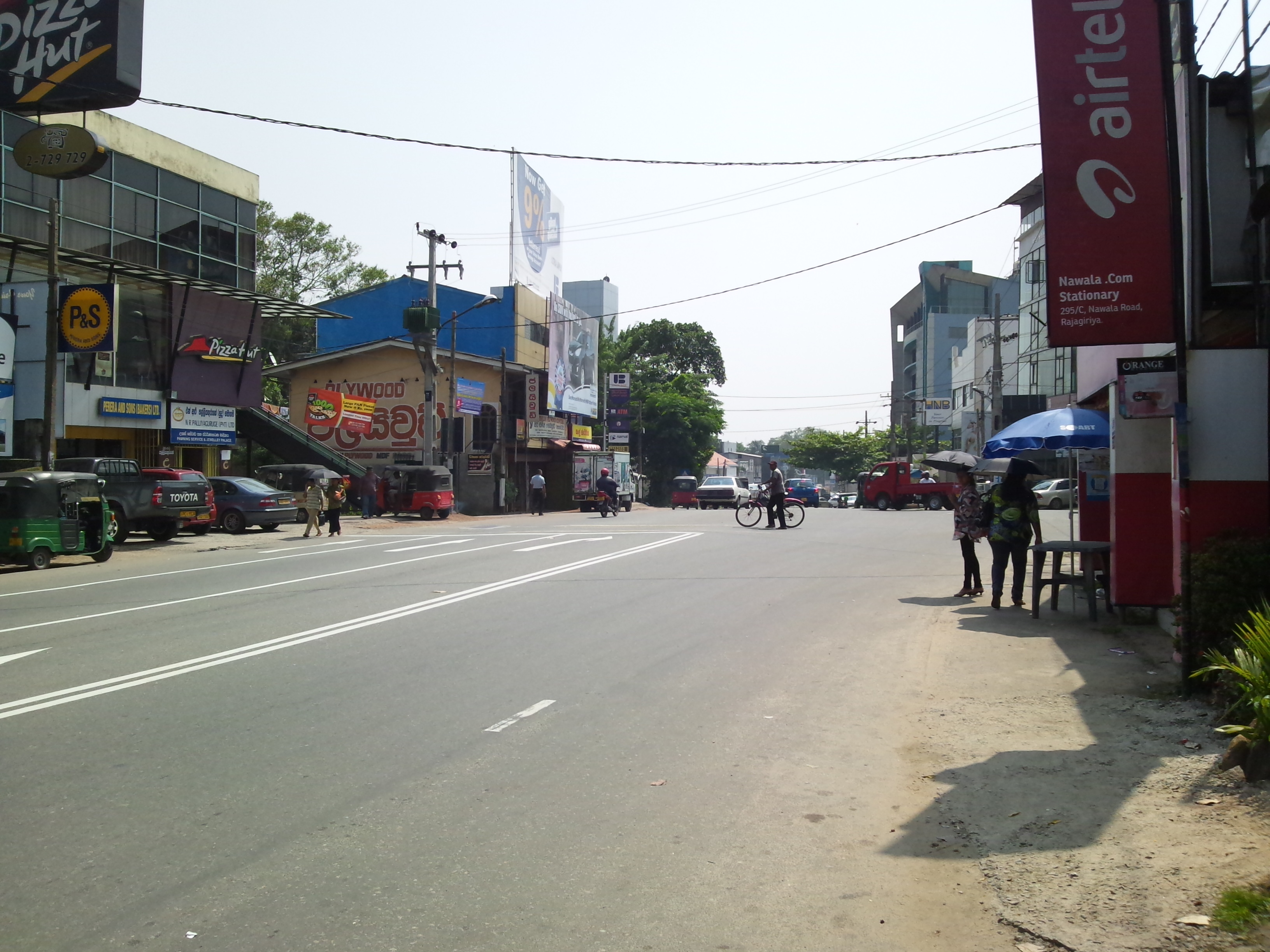
- Nawala
- Motto: Nawala Annasi
- Location within Sri Lanka
- Coordinates: 6°54′0″N 79°53′0″E
- Country: Sri Lanka
- Province: Western Province
- District: Colombo District

Government
  - Mayor: Madura Vithanage (SLPP)
- Time zone: UTC+5:30 (Sri Lanka Time)

Nawala is an up-market residential suburb of Colombo, within the Kotte municipality in the western province of Sri Lanka, and is approximately 6 km south of Colombo City.

Nawala lies between the commercial capital Colombo and the administrative capital of Kotte. It is considered to be a part of Rajagiriya and is bordered by Nugegoda to the south and Narahenpita to the west. It comprises two wards of the Sri Jayawardanapura Kotte Municipal Council area:

- Ward no. 3 — Welikada-Nawala (includes Bandaranaikepura and Royal Gardens, the Municipal offices and the western half of Nawala and of Koswatte, bounded by the Cotta Road on the north, the Heen Ela canal on the west, the Diyawanna Oya canal on the south and the Nawala Road on the east).
- Ward no. 4 — Nawala (includes Welikadawatte, eastern Koswatte and Nawala, bounded by the Cotta Road on the north, the Nawala Road on the west and the Diyawanna Oya canal on the south and east).

Nawala is currently the ceramic capital of Sri Lanka. During the past couple of years, the number of ceramic stores has increased rapidly and is still counting. However, today Nawala is a cosmopolitan town, encompassing all facilities. Supermarkets, restaurants, banks, fuel stations, book shops, grocery shops, hardware shops and many retailers of upmarket brands have made Nawala a landmark town.

However, the old village of Nawala, which until the 1920s was mainly uninhabited, was bounded by the Diyawanna Oya to the south and east, the Heen Ela to the west, and Koswatte to the North. Its main feature was the ammunition dump, the bunkers of which are still visible in the Nawala Cemetery. Decades before the modern era, when there was mass migration from villages to suburbs, Nawala was said to house large plant nurseries. Nawala came into prominence after the opening of the economy in 1977 and is today a very popular residential/commercial town in Colombo.

Apart from hundreds of ceramic retail establishments today, Nawala is home to a notable list of restaurants. Steamboat restaurant and chopsticks and crossroads restaurants are prominently located near the junction. From the junction, turn right on the left. Sen-Sal Nawala, yet another popular restaurant cum bakery. Further down towards Nugegoda passing, The Open University of Sri Lanka, (OUSL) on the right is Sovereign German Restaurant popular for German cuisine. Kandawatte Road, located opposite the Wetland park, Nawala houses the famous Thiru Murugan's Food Waves serving vegetarian Indian cuisine. Nawala is next to Rajagiriya.
