= Koswatte =

Koswatta කොස්වත්ත கொஸ்வத்தை
- Suburb
- Location within Sri Lanka
- Coordinates: 6°53′28″N 79°55′42″E
- Country: Sri Lanka
- Province: Western Province
- District: Colombo District
- Time zone: UTC+5:30 (Sri Lanka Standard Time Zone)

Koswatta (Sinhala: කොස්වත්ත, Tamil: கொஸ்வத்தை) is a junction located inside the main town Battaramulla located near Colombo in Sri Lanka. The junction is also known as the "Thalangama-Koswatte" junction.

A government hospital and a police station are located in this junction.
