= Japanese School in Colombo =

- コロンボ日本人学校 කොළඹ ජපන් පාසල
- Japanese School in Colombo Logo

Location
- NO.4 LAKE DRIVE, SRI JAYAWARDANAPURA MAWATHA, COLOMBO.8; Colombo; Sri Lanka; 6.909211°N 79.888126°E

Information
- Established: 1966; 60 years ago
- Website: www.jscol.com

The Japanese School in Colombo (コロンボ日本人学校, Koronbo Nihonjin Gakkō) is a Japanese international school located in Colombo, the largest city in Sri Lanka. It was established in 1966 (Shōwa 41). As of 2023, there are 11 students in total, including 9 in the elementary school and 2 in the junior high school.

== History ==
The school opened on September 2, 1966. For over 30 years, the school did not have its own school building, but in April 2002, a new building was completed and the school moved. There was a time when the number of students in the elementary and junior high schools exceeded 50, but in the 2010s, it has been hovering around 10.

== Education ==
Because it is a Japanese school, the curriculum is based on the Japanese curriculum, but it also offers classes on English language education, Sri Lankan culture, and traditional Japanese culture.

The school is particularly focused on international understanding education, and offers a wide range of classes such as local understanding, environmental education, culture, religion, and sports through International Activity classes. In addition, a supplementary textbook titled "Our Sri Lanka" was compiled and used in social studies classes.

During the COVID-19 pandemic, online classes were held using Zoom. With support from the Panasonic Education Foundation, classes were also conducted using one IPad per student.
