= Devi Balika Vidyalaya =

- දේවි බාලිකා විද්‍යාලය தேவி பாலிகா வித்தியாலயம்

Location
- Borella; Sri Lanka; 6.910740°N 79.882684°E

Information
- Type: National School
- Motto: Manasa Sanvuta Dheera (Great are those who are serene in mind)
- Religious affiliation: Buddhist
- Established: 15 January 1953; 73 years ago
- Founder: Deshabandu Dr. Wimala de Silva
- Principal: Subhashini Dematagoda
- Grades: Class 6 - 13
- Gender: Girls
- Age: 11 to 19
- Enrollment: 3500
- Language: Sinhala, English
- Colours: Silver and Maroon
- Website: www.devibalika.com

Devi Balika Vidyalaya is a public national girls' school in Colombo, Sri Lanka. Girls are admitted at grade six, based on the results of an island-wide scholarship examination. Like other national schools it is controlled by the central government, as opposed to a provincial council.

== History ==
By 1950, some of the recommendations of the Kannangara report had been implemented, but the opportunities for educational equality remained inadequate. The state accepted the recommendation of the White Paper on education (1950), to split education at grade 8, when compulsory education ended. One of the three streams was academic. In keeping with this policy, Government Girls' College, Castle Street (Devi Balika Vidyalaya) began to offer classes from grade 9 to 12, catering to academically gifted girls. The Department of Education further intended this new school to be a centre of excellence in science education, for which there was great demand after World War II.

The school was founded on 15 January 1953, constructed with prefabricated material, enrolling 53 students and hosting 5 teachers.

The importance of extra curricular activities was recognized though the emphasis was on academic pursuits. Girl Guiding, dancing (Kandyan, Indian and country dancing), music, sports and drama were introduced.

Wimala de Silva was its founder principal.

A hostel was established in 1997 with the help of alumnae. On 5 March 1998 a School Multipurpose Auditorium was opened. Fundraising projects were held to swell the fund to match the grant given by the Ministry of Education. In addition, financial contributions received from other ministries, Pelpola Vipassi Foundation, various institutions, parents, and alumnae were a major support in doing this task. Engineering and Architectural consultancy and various free services received from supporters, made the 1st and 2nd stages of the School Multipurpose Auditorium Project a success.

== Past Principals ==
- Dr. (Mrs.) Wimala De Silva – Jan 1953 – Dec 1966
- Kalyani De Zoysa – Jan 1966 – May 1985
- Mercy Edussuriya – Jan 1986 – Sep 1986
- Soma Subasinghe – May 1987 – Dec 1987
- Jayanthi Pinnagoda – Jan 1988 – April 1995
- Kalyani Lakshman – June 1995 – March 2000
- Ranuka Malalasekara – Nov 2004 — 2008
- W.D.P.K. Samarasinghe – 2009 — 2023
- Subhashini Dematagoda — 2023 to 2024
- Nilakshika Hapugoda - 2025 to Current

== Notable alumni ==
- Saroja Sirisena - Diplomat, former Sri Lankan High Commissioner to the United Kingdom, former Sri Lankan Ambassador to Austria
- Seetha Arambepola - Member of Parliament (National List) (2020-present), Governor of the Western Province (2019-2020)

== Sources ==
- Devi Archive and PPA news letters by Iresha Wijayabandara
