= Western Hospital =

- Western Hospital logo

- Location within Greater Colombo

Geography
- Location: Colombo, Sri Lanka
- Coordinates: 06°54′42″N 79°53′8″E

Organisation
- Care system: Private
- Type: General

Services
- Beds: 25

History
- Founded: 1984

Links
- Website: westernhospital.lk
- Lists: Hospitals in Sri Lanka

Western Hospital (Western Infirmary) is a private hospital located in Colombo 8, Sri Lanka that specializes in renal disease care, dialysis and transplantation. Initially opened to provide kidney care services to Sri Lankan patients, Western Hospital has now diversified to providing general health care services, and is one of the many private hospitals in Colombo, Sri Lanka. As of December 2022, the hospital is currently accused of involvement in duping organ donors into donating their kidneys. The hospital management has denied involvement in any such selling/buying of organs, which might or might not have occurred between donors and receivers.

== Location ==
Western Hospital, also known as Western Infirmary, is located at 218 Cotta Road, Borella, (Colombo 8), which is the largest suburb in Colombo.

== History ==
Western Hospital was first opened as Lanka Medicare Company in 1984, with the aim of providing kidney care to patients in Sri Lanka. It was founded by Prof Rezvi Sheriff, a renowned nephrologist in Sri Lanka who set up the first kidney transplant program in the island in October 1985. Western Hospital has the longest running kidney transplant program in the country. Today, it has expanded to provide various other services.

== Services ==
Western Hospital has 2 wards and 4 special units for inpatient services with approximately 25 beds. Wards are divided into either individual rooms or cubicles. The hospital offers intensive care for medical and post surgical cases as well as renal intensive care for kidney transplant patients. It has twin theatres for General Surgery, Gynaecology, Obstetrics and Kidney Transplant Surgery.

Other patient services include OPD, Emergency Services, Mobile Services and Channeled Consultations for various specialties including Nephrology, Cardiology, Diabetology, ENT Surgery, Neurology, Oncology, Ophthalmology, Psychiatry, Rheumatology and more. Diagnostic Services available at Western Hospital include Laboratory Services, Imaging Services and Clinical Diagnostics.

== Dialysis and transplants in Sri Lanka ==
Western Hospital provides haemodialysis services and continuous ambulatory peritoneal dialysis services, as well as kidney transplants in Sri Lanka, which are ratified by the Ministry of Health, Sri Lanka. Transplants are carried out on both locals and foreigners, with medical tourism available.

== See also ==
- List of hospitals in Sri Lanka
