= Sri Jayawardenepura Kotte =

Legislative capital of Sri Lanka

Sri Jayawardenepura Kotte ශ්‍රී ජයවර්ධනපුර කෝට්ටේ ஶ்ரீ ஜெயவர்த்தனபுர கோட்டை
- Administrative Capital
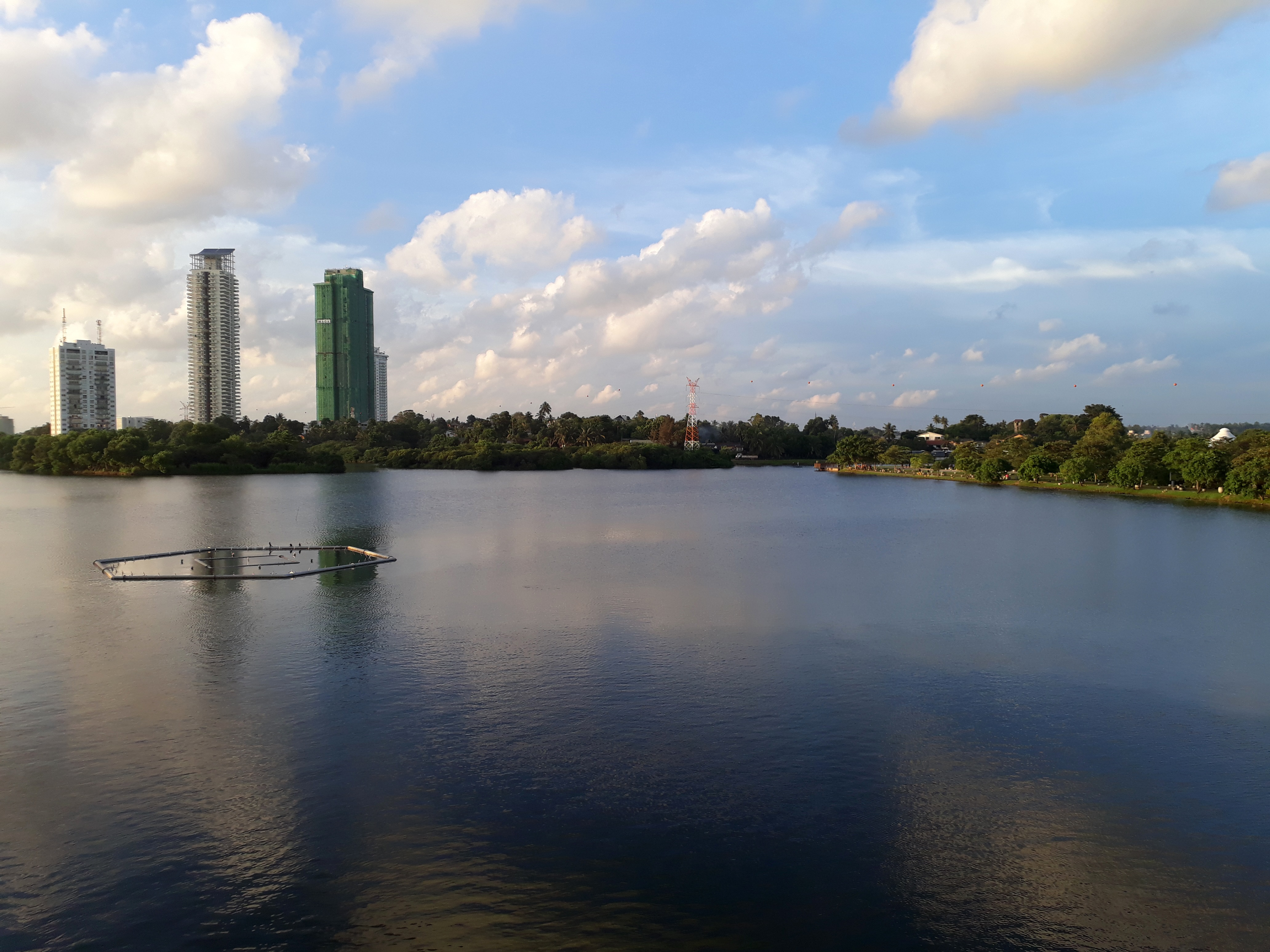
- View from Diyawanna Lake

- Location within Colombo District Location within Sri Lanka Location within Asia
- Coordinates: 6°55′N 79°55′E
- Country: Sri Lanka
- Province: Western Province
- District: Colombo District

Government
  - Municipal Council: Sri Jayawardenepura Kotte Municipal Council
  - Mayor: Atapattu Hewa Kankanamage Yudhistira Arosa (NPP)

Area
  - Administrative Capital: 17 km^{2} (6.6 sq mi)

Population (2012 census)
  - Administrative Capital: 107,925
  - Density: 3,305/km^{2} (8,560/sq mi)
  - Metro: 2,234,289
- Time zone: UTC+5:30 (SLST)
- Postal code: 10100
- Area code: 011
- Website: kotte.mc.gov.lk

Sri Jayawardenepura Kotte (Sinhala pronunciation: [ʃriː dʒajəʋard̪ənəpurə ko̞ːʈːe̞ː]), also known as Kotte, is the legislative capital city of Sri Lanka. Sri Jayawardenepura Kotte is located adjacent to the urban area of Sri Lanka's de facto economic capital, Colombo.

The Sri Jayawardenepura Kotte Municipal Council area is bounded in:

- the North by Kolonnawa Urban Council area,
- the North-East by the Kotikawatta–Mulleriyawa Pradeshiya Sabha area,
- the East by the Kaduwela Municipal Council area,
- the South-East by the Maharagama Urban Council area,
- the South-West by the Dehiwala-Mount Lavinia Municipal Council and
- the West by the Colombo Municipal Council area, which is the commercial capital of Sri Lanka.

== History ==
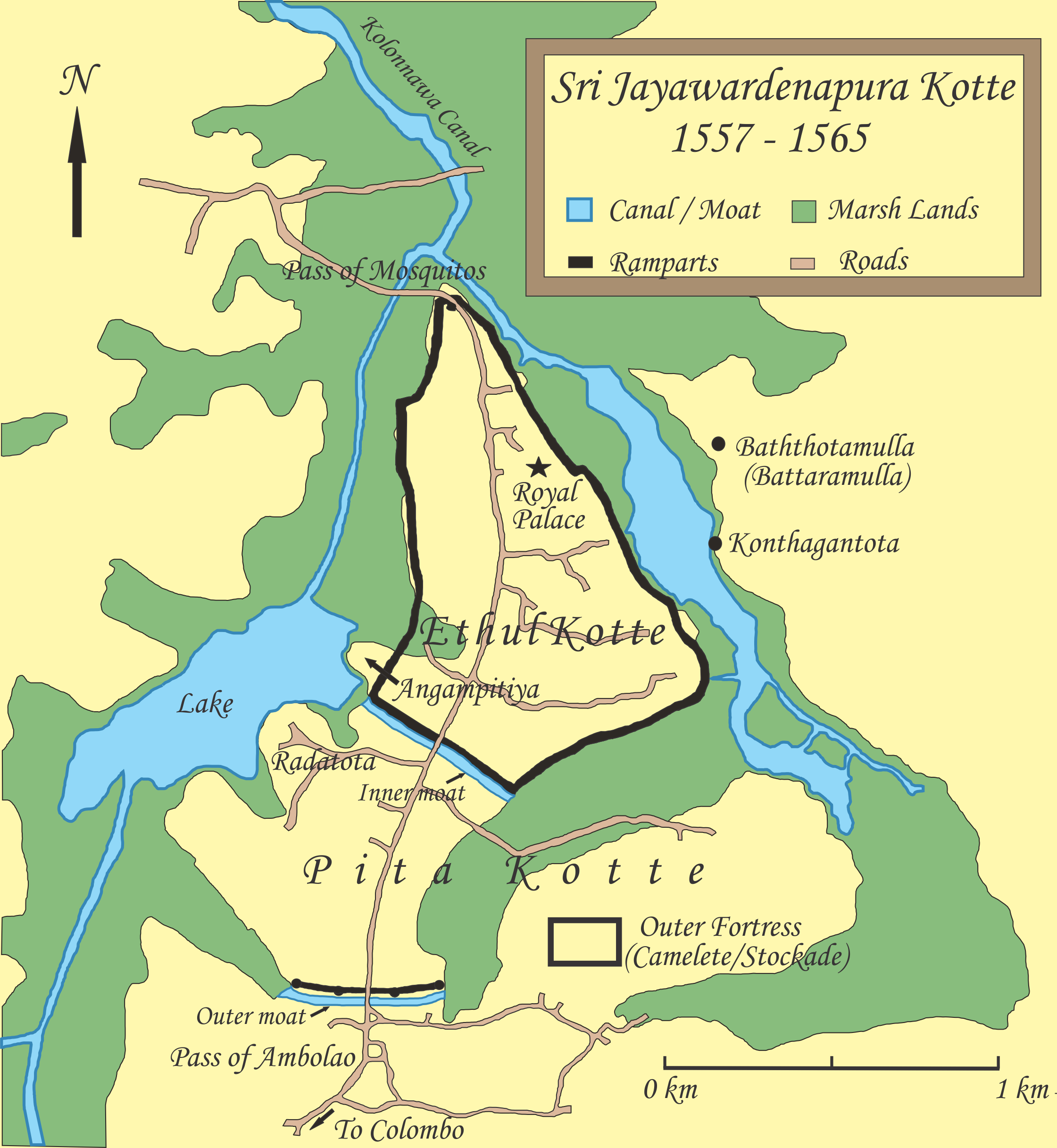
Map of Kotte (1557–1565)

The village of Darugama lay at the confluence of two streams, the Diyawanna Oya and the Kolonnawa Oya. As Darugama was a naturally secure place, it was not easy for enemies to enter it. Here, in the 13th century, a local chieftain, Nissanka Alagakkonara, built a Kotte, or fortress.

Alagakkonara is mentioned by Ibn Batuta as ruling in Kurunegala, but other sources indicate that he was the Bandara (Guardian) of Raigama Korale (county) in the modern Kalutara District. Arya Chakravarthy's army was held by Alagakkonara in front of Kotte, while he defeated the enemy's invasion fleet at Panadura to the south-west.

Kotte was a jala durgha (water fortress), in the shape of a triangle, with the Diyawanna Oya and Kolonnawa Oya marshes forming two long sides; along the shorter third (land) side a large moat (the 'inner moat') was dug. The fortress was nearly 2.5 km^{2} (0.97 sq mi) in area, fortified with ramparts of kabook or laterite rock, 2.5 metres (8 ft 2 in) high and 10.7 metres (35 ft) in breadth.

In 1391, following the conquest of the Kingdom of Jaffna by Prince Sapumal (Sembahap Perumal), Kotte was given the epithet 'Sri Jayawardenepura' ('resplendent city of growing victory'). It became the capital of the ancient Kingdom of Kotte, which it remained until the end of the 16th century.

From the ramparts to the magnificent three storied buildings that housed the kings palace, laterite and clay were the main raw material used in its construction. One of the places from which the laterite blocks were mined can be seen even today inside the premises of Ananda Sasthralaya (a local school).

The main features of the capital city were:

- The King's palace, with walls of quartz that sparkle in the moonlight (candrakanta pasana) and a golden spire, with beautiful flower gardens and springs of water,
- The three-storeyed Dalada Maligawa with Buddha's sacred tooth relic in it (Temple of the tooth),
- The five-storeyed "Arama" where sixty Buddhist Bhikkus resided, with a Sangha Raja(a high priest)as the chief incumbent,
- The king's treasure house,
- The 'Kotavehara' at Baddagana, the only Buddhist temple of the city outside the moat and rampart,
- The Royal cemetery at Beddagana (Veherakanda memorial),
- The 'Angampitiya', the military parade and training ground just inside the inner moat.

The Portuguese arrived on the island in 1505 and were initially welcomed by the king, but they had militaristic and monopolistic intentions and gained control of the city by 1565. Failing to withstand repeated assaults by the forces of the neighbouring Kingdom of Sitawaka, the city was abandoned by the Portuguese, who made Colombo their new capital.

Like similar cities of that era, Sri Jayawardenepura was built with security in mind. A rampart and moat protected the entire city. Traces of this moat and rampart are still visible today at certain places. Along parts of the rampart, encroachers have now built houses, garages and even toilets.

The urbanisation of Kotte restarted in the 19th century. The archaeological remains were torn up and used as building materials (a process that continues)—some of it even ending up in the Victoria Bridge, across the Kelani River.

Sri Lanka formally changed its administrative capital from Colombo to Sri Jayawardenepura Kotte in 1982. While designated as the new capital in 1977 to relieve congestion in Colombo, the official relocation was marked by the inauguration of the new Parliament building in Kotte on 29 April 1982.

== Legislature ==
The New Parliament was inaugurated on 29 April 1982. The buildings were built on reclaimed land, after a massive lake was formed by dredging the marshlands around the Diyawanna Oya. The new parliamentary buildings were built on Duwa, a 50,000 square metre (12 acre) island in the centre of the lake. The island (off Baddegana Road, Pita Kotte) had been used as a recreation and brawling spot for Portuguese soldiers in the last days of Kotte era, alcohol being banned from the Royal City. It had belonged to E. W. Perera and had housed a chicken farm prior to being vested in the state. On 29 April 1982, the new parliamentary complex was formally declared open by president J. R. Jayewardene.

The process of relocating government institutions from the former capital of Colombo is still in progress.

== Municipal structure ==
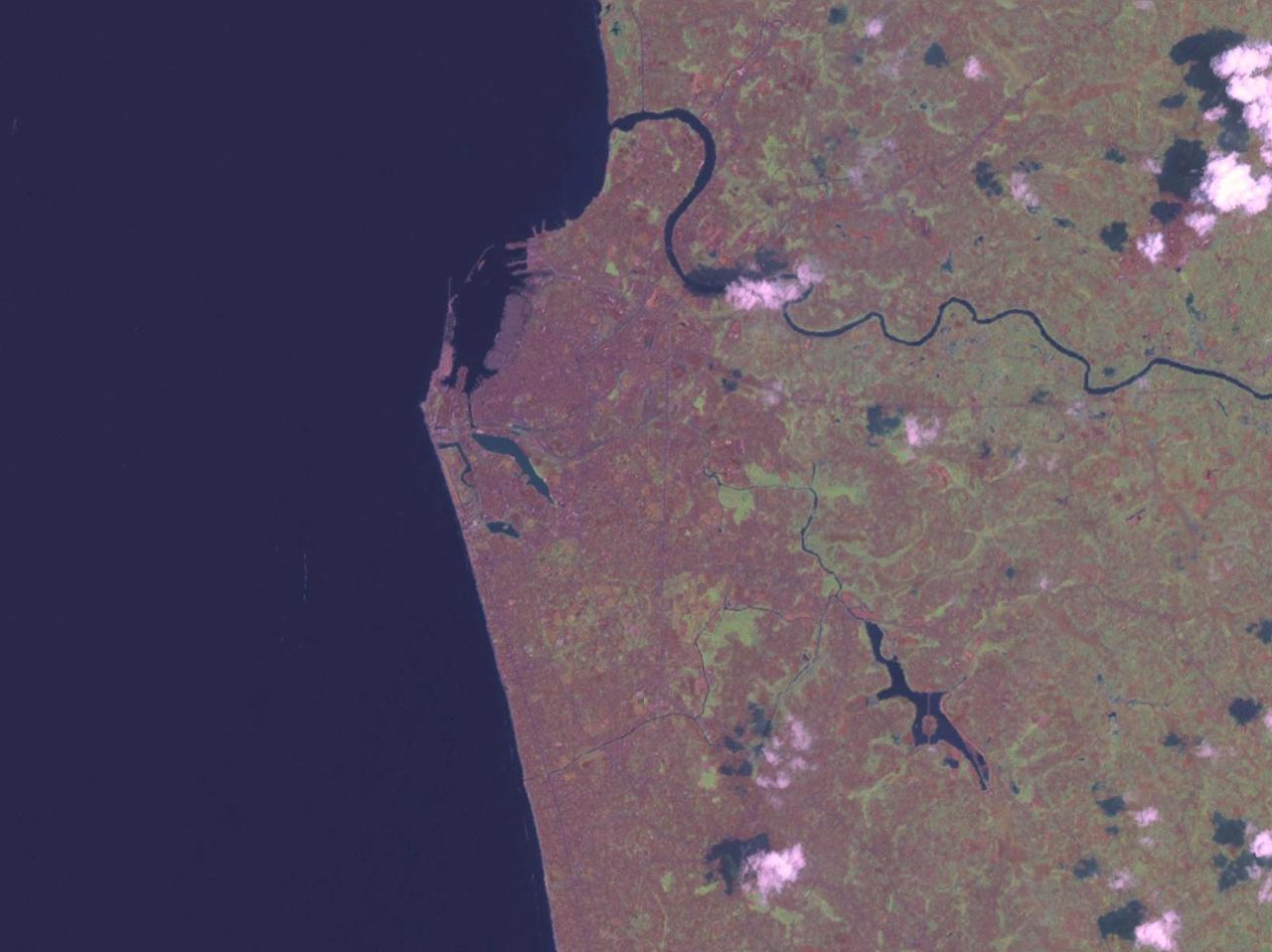
Sri Jayawardenepura Kotte is located at the southeast of Colombo, here seen in a satellite image.

The Kotte Urban Development Council was created in the 1930s, with a modern building at Rajagiriya. It was succeeded by the Kotte Urban Council, which had a large section of its area removed and tagged onto the Colombo Municipal Council ward of Borella while the Battaramulla urban council was dissolved and a small section of Battaramulla tagged onto the Kotte Urban Council. The Kotte Urban Council became the Sri Jayawardenepura Kotte Municipal Council in 1997, with Chandra Silva as the first Mayor.

There are 20 Members of the Municipal Council (MMCs), elected on proportional representation. There are 18 wards, but these are now merely polling divisions, without individual representation.

=== Zones ===
- Pita Kotte
- Ethul Kotte
- Nawala
- Nugegoda
- Rajagiriya

=== Wards ===
Ward map of Sri Jayawardanapura Kotte Municipal Council
Ward No.	Ward name
01	Obesekarapura
02	Moragasmulla
03	Meda Welikada
04	Rajagiriya
05	Bandaranayakapura
06	Nawala West
07	Koswatta
08	Ethulkotte
09	Pitakotte East
10	Pitakotte
11	Pitakotte West
12	Nawala East
13	Nugegoda West
14	Pagoda North
15	Gangodavila East
16	Pagoda South
17	Nugegoda East
18	Gangodavila West

=== Grama Niladhari Division ===
Division No.	Division name
514	Welikada East
514A	Welikada West
514B	Rajagiriya
514C	Obesekarapura
514D	Welikada North
519	Nugegoda
519A	Pagoda
519B	Nugegoda West
519C	Pagoda East
520	Nawala West
520A	Koswatte
520B	Nawala East
521	Ethul Kotte
521A	Ethul Kotte West
522	Pitakotte West
522A	Pitakotte East
522B	Pitakotte
526	Gangodavila North
526A	Gangodavila South
526C	Gangodavila East

== Demographics ==
Sri Jayawardenepura Kotte is a multi-ethnic, multi-religious urban centre. According to the census of 2012, the demographics by ethnicity and religion is as follows:

Ethnic identification in Sri Jayawardenepura Kotte, 2012
Ethnic group	Population	Percentage
Sinhalese	91,268	84.89%
Sri Lankan Tamil	7,503	6.98%
Sri Lankan Moor	5,207	4.84%
Burgher	1,049	0.98%
Indian Tamil	801	0.75%
Malay	710	0.66%
Sri Lankan Chetty	72	0.07%
Baratha	58	0.05%
Other	840	0.78%
Total	107,508	100.00%

Religious identification in Sri Jayawardenepura Kotte, 2012
Religion	Population	Percentage
Buddhist	82,841	77.06%
Roman Catholic	7,827	7.28%
Muslim	6,772	6.30%
Other Christian	5,040	4.69%
Hindu	4,864	4.52%
Other	164	0.15%
Total	107,508	100.00%

== Infrastructure ==
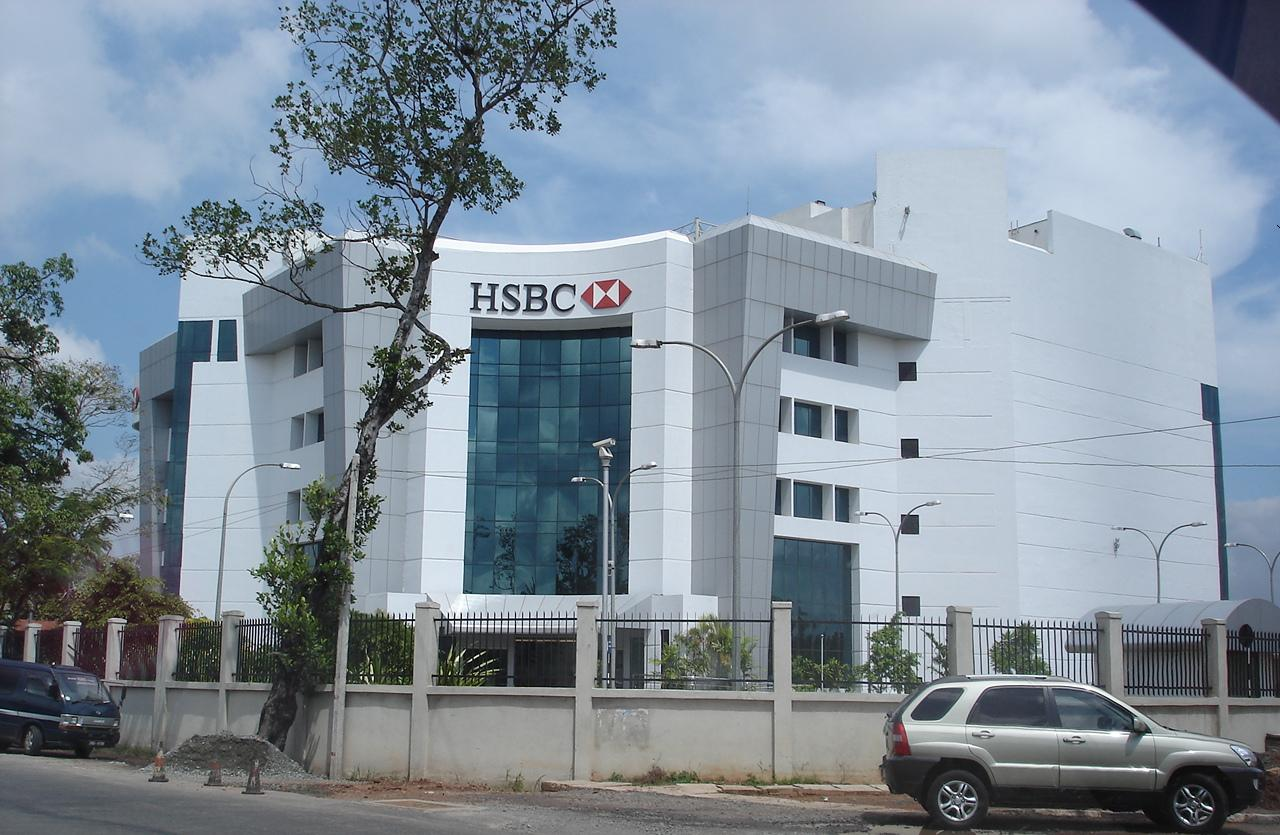
The HSBC Service Centre

=== Transport ===
The only main railway station is at Nugegoda, on the Kelani Valley Line. Also at Nugegoda is the main bus terminus. There are subsidiary bus stands at Pita Kotte. This urban area is well served by buses and there is a SLTB bus depot at Udahamulla.

In 2005, a Passenger boat service was being finalised and would commence adjacent to Parliament Junction at Battaramulla and end at the Wellawatte canal near Marine drive. Each journey would take around 30 minutes. It would have stations at the Kotte Marsh, Nawala, Open University, Apollo Hospital, Duplication road, Wellawatte and at St Peter's College, Colombo. The Sri Lanka Navy is conducting a pilot project between the Open University and Wellawatte.

=== Health ===
The main hospital of area situated at Madivela known as Sri Jayawardenepura Hospital is a gift from the Japanese government. There is a dedicated Eye & ENT hospital at Rajagiriya, and another maternity hospital under construction in Nawala. A small private health centre, the Blue Cross Hospital at Rajagiriya, provides basic facilities for medical diagnostics, and there is a small nursing home in Park Lane, Welikada, much patronised by Maldivians.

=== Education ===
There are a number of state and private schools in Kotte. They are either "national schools" (run by the central government; Main School President's College, Sri Jayawardenepura Kotte), "government schools" (run by the Provincial Councils), semi-government/private schools, or International schools (run by trusts and individuals; Gateway College Colombo is an example of the latter class of school).

The oldest English school on the island is Sri Jayawardenepura Maha Vidyalaya, formerly known as Christian College, located in Pita Kotte. The Ananda Sastralaya at Pita Kotte is the oldest Buddhist school in the city, and Anula Vidyalaya, Nugegoda is the third-largest Buddhist girls school in South Asia, with over 5000 students.

The Education Ministry as well as the Department of Examinations is based in Kotte.

A considerable number of the students living within the zone study at government owned colleges and International schools in Colombo.

Located at Nawala is the Open University, Sri Lanka, and at Nugegoda is the University of Sri Jayewardenepura. Public Libraries are conveniently located, and can be found at Nugegoda and Rajagiriya.

== Climate ==
Sri Jayawardenepura Kotte features a tropical rainforest climate (Köppen: Af) more subject to the Intertropical Convergence Zone than the trade winds. Since there are a few cyclones, the climate is not purely equatorial but subequatorial, with little variation in temperatures throughout the course of the year. The city does feature wetter and drier months, with February on average being its driest month, seeing on average 63 mm (2.5 in) of precipitation. However, since none of the average monthly precipitation falls below 60 mm (2.4 in), Sri Jayawardenepura Kotte falls under the tropical rainforest climate category.

Climate data for Sri Jayawardenepura Kotte
Month	Jan	Feb	Mar	Apr	May	Jun	Jul	Aug	Sep	Oct	Nov	Dec	Year
Mean daily maximum °C (°F)	30.6 (87.1)	31.2 (88.2)	31.7 (89.1)	31.8 (89.2)	31.1 (88.0)	30.4 (86.7)	30.0 (86.0)	30.0 (86.0)	30.3 (86.5)	30.0 (86.0)	30.2 (86.4)	30.4 (86.7)	30.6 (87.2)
Daily mean °C (°F)	26.6 (79.9)	26.9 (80.4)	27.7 (81.9)	28.2 (82.8)	28.3 (82.9)	27.9 (82.2)	27.5 (81.5)	27.6 (81.7)	27.5 (81.5)	27.0 (80.6)	26.7 (80.1)	26.6 (79.9)	27.4 (81.3)
Mean daily minimum °C (°F)	22.3 (72.1)	22.7 (72.9)	23.7 (74.7)	24.6 (76.3)	25.5 (77.9)	25.5 (77.9)	25.1 (77.2)	25.2 (77.4)	24.8 (76.6)	24.0 (75.2)	23.2 (73.8)	22.8 (73.0)	24.1 (75.4)
Average precipitation mm (inches)	85 (3.3)	63 (2.5)	112 (4.4)	252 (9.9)	335 (13.2)	195 (7.7)	130 (5.1)	95 (3.7)	165 (6.5)	358 (14.1)	309 (12.2)	153 (6.0)	2,251 (88.6)
Source 1: Free Meteo (1961–1990)
Source 2: Weatherbase for precipitation

== Sports and recreation ==
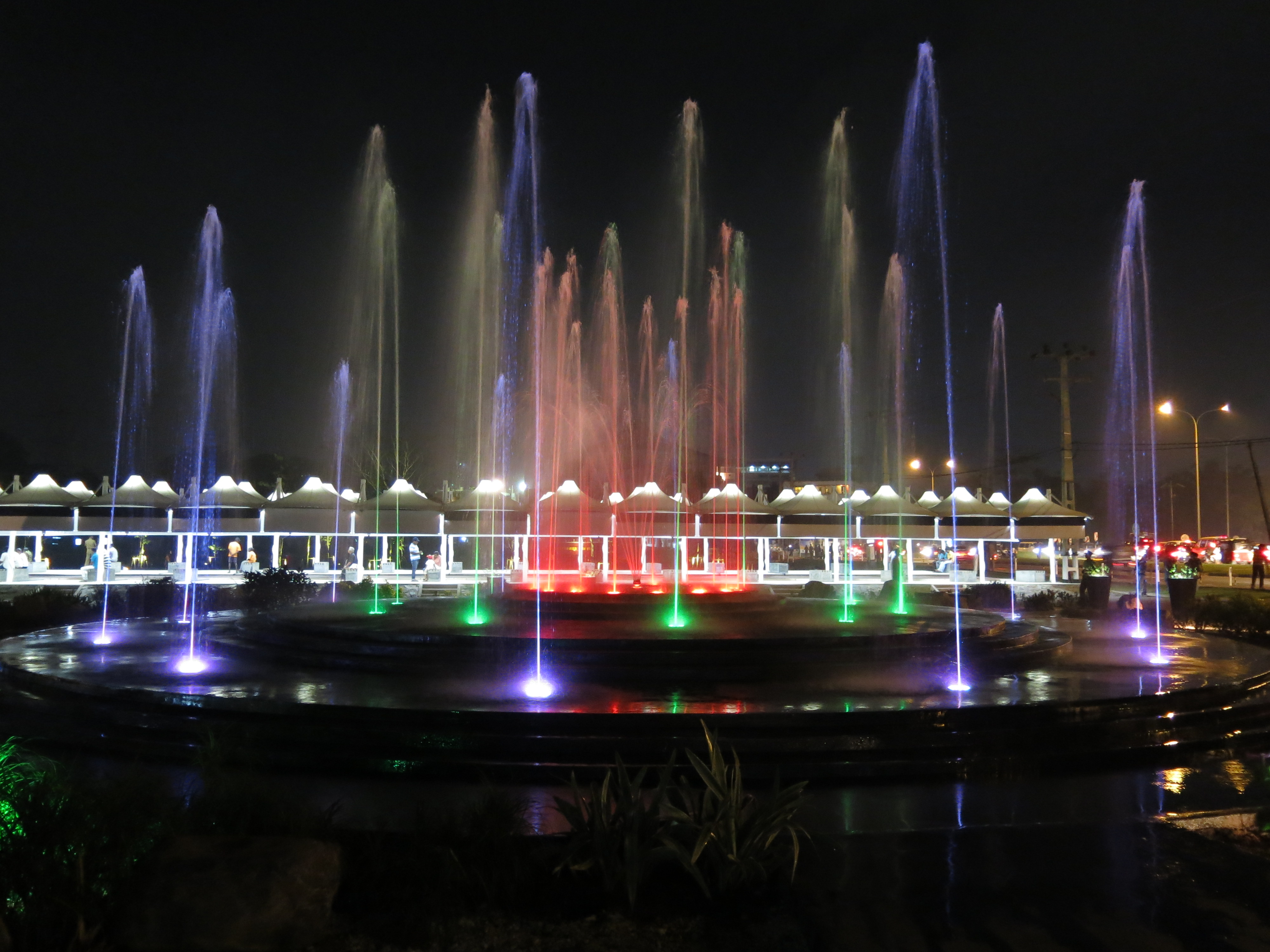
Diyatha Uyana

Cricket is the most popular sport in this urban area as well as the country and is usually played in the grounds around the city.

Association football was at one time the most popular sport in the Colombo area, although it was eclipsed by cricket after 1980. Four separate football clubs (Lido, Welikada Progress, Welikada Red Star and Welikada United) once used the EW Perera Park grounds at Welikada, Rajagiriya where a pavilion was constructed in the 1970s. However, when the grounds were destroyed by the JR Jayawardene regime in the late 1970s, the football clubs disappeared. Football continued to be played at the grounds at Obeysekerapura in Rajagiriya.

In the 1990s, the Kotte Municipal Council constructed the Chandra Silva Stadium, to replace the EW Perera Grounds. Part of the grounds was sold and later used to construct the HSBC building. In 2007 the Municipality, with aid from the Ministry of Urban Development, completed the first stage of the new Chandra Silva Stadium on the site of a rubbish dump behind the HSBC building.

Recently, football has once more grown in popularity, and the sport now has a considerable following. The football association's new training facility at Kotte is aimed at harnessing and developing the available talent and organizing the individual players into a cohesive team. It includes a football playground with a sprinkler system, gym and a host of other facilities.

Other sports are mostly played in the numerous clubs and gyms, and include tennis, squash, billiards, horse riding, indoor cricket, badminton and table tennis. Horse riding can be pursued at the Premadasa Riding School in Nugegoda.

== Notable residents ==
- Edward Walter Perera (1875–1953), a Ceylonese (Sri Lankan) barrister, politician and freedom fighter.
- Sir James Peter Obeyesekere II Maha Mudaliyar, JP (1879–1968), a Ceylonese colonial-era headmen, the last Head Mudaliyar and served as aide-de-camp to the British Governor of Ceylon and Governor General of Ceylon.
- Tissa Abeysekara (1939–2009), an eminent film personality.

== See also ==
- University of Sri Jayewardenepura
