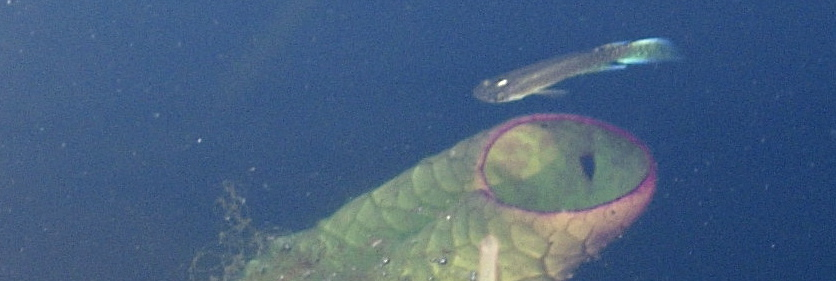

Conservation status
- Data Deficient (IUCN 3.1)

Scientific classification
- Kingdom: Animalia
- Phylum: Chordata
- Class: Actinopterygii
- Order: Cyprinodontiformes
- Family: Aplocheilidae
- Genus: Aplocheilus
- Species: A. kirchmayeri

Binomial name
- Aplocheilus kirchmayeri Berkenkamp and Etzel, 1986

= Aplocheilus kirchmayeri =

Species of killifish

Aplocheilus kirchmayeri is a species of killifish native to India. It was named after the aquarist J. Kirchmayer. Its validity as a species has been questioned, with some experts believing that it is a subspecies of Aplocheilus blockii. The species has been noted to be rather difficult to keep in an aquarium.

== Description ==
The species is a freshwater fish. The maximum length is 5 cm (2.0 in). Its anal fin has 14 rays and yellow lines. There is a black spot on each of the dorsal fins as well. Markings are present surrounding the eyes and on the mouth.
