= Surface wave detection by animals =

Sensory mechanisms in aquatic animals

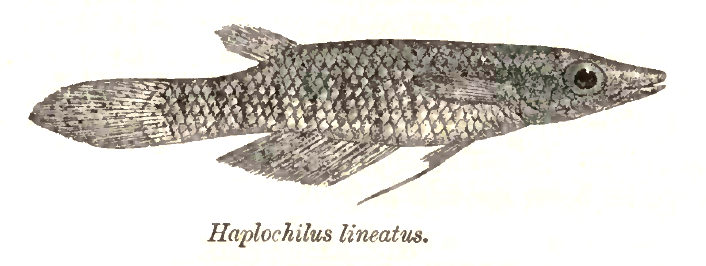
Most research on the detection of surface waves has been done on the striped panchax, Aplocheilus lineatus

Surface wave detection by animals is the process by which animals, such as surface-feeding fish are able to sense and localize prey and other objects on the surface of a body of water by analyzing features of the ripples generated by objects' movement at the surface. Features analyzed include waveform properties such as frequency, change in frequency, and amplitude, and the curvature of the wavefront. A number of different species are proficient in surface wave detection, including some aquatic insects and toads, though most research is done on the topminnow/surface killifish Aplocheilus lineatus. The fish and other animals with this ability spend large amounts of time near the water surface, some just to feed and others their entire lives.

== Description of behavior ==
Certain species of fish spend a substantial portion of their lives near the surface of the water in order to feed, usually on insects that are struggling at the surface. Species that detect surface waves typically use them to localize such prey. When the hunting posture is assumed (which may be neutral posture) as specific mechanosensitive organ is held in contact with the surface of the water in order that mechanoreceptors can receive surface waves. The animal will wait a small amount of time (typically <1s) before initiating a response towards the prey, should the surface waves perceived fall within the preferred stimulus range. Response towards prey typically follows the pattern orientation towards prey, swimming towards prey, and then prey capture. This ability is sometimes referred to as a sense of "distant touch."

Several species have been shown to use surface wave detection for prey capture. Among these are many species of freshwater fish, notably the groups hatchetfish (Gasteropelecidae), freshwater butterflyfish (Pantodontidae), halfbeaks (Hemiramphidae) and killifish (Aplocheilidae)(list from). For its consistently stellar performance at the task, the topminnow/killfish (both terms are used in the literature) is one of the primary models for investigation. These species tend to live in small bodies of freshwater, as well as creeks and swamps.

== Surface waves ==
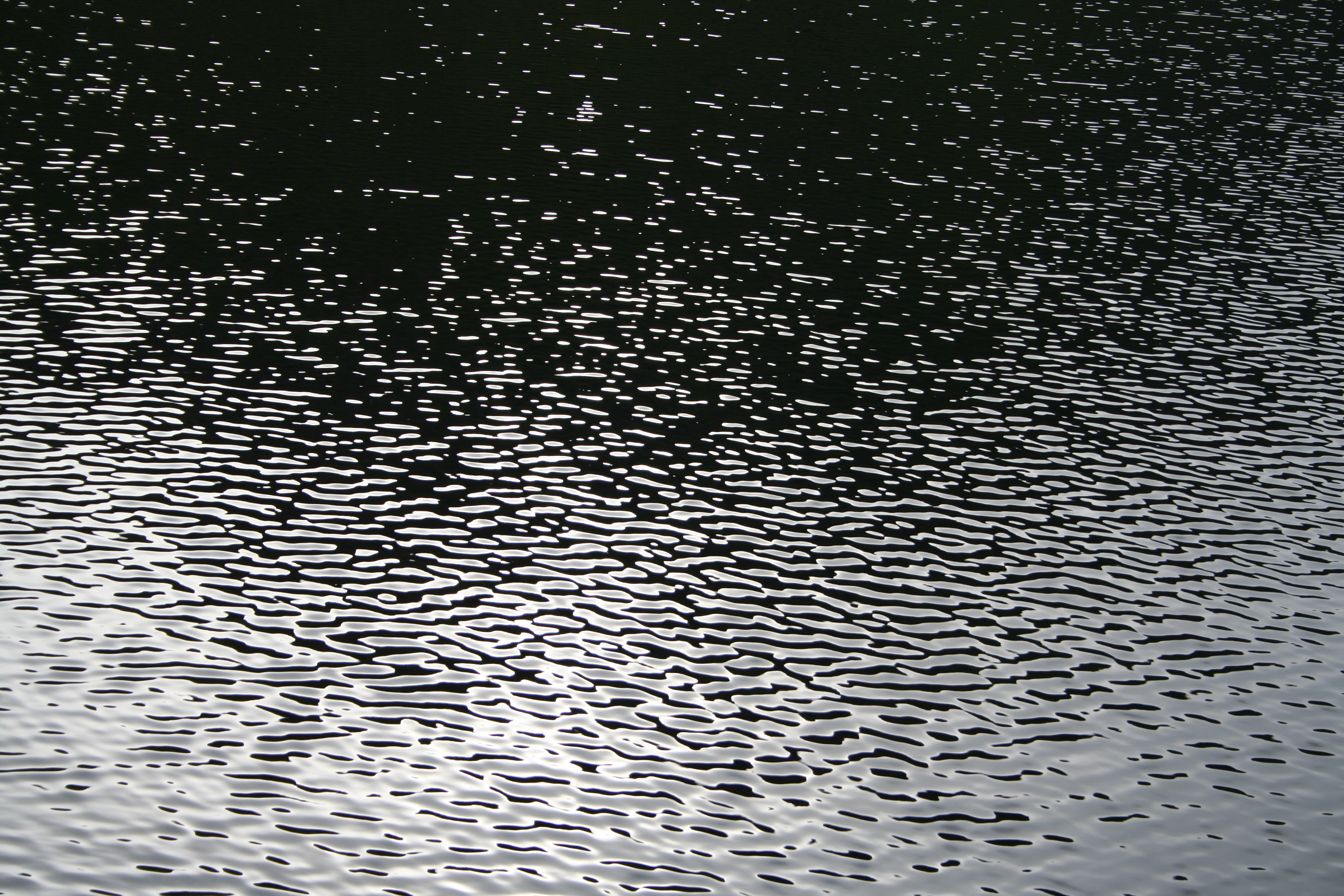
Capillary wave ripples on Lifjord in Øksnes Municipality, Norway

The ripples which surface-feeding fish detect are known more technically as capillary waves. Capillary waves are generated by movement of an object at the surface of the water or from the brief contact of an object with the surface from either medium (air or water). Waves radiate outward in concentric circles from the source, and the waveform of each train of waves changes in very specific and predictable waves, as dictated by surface tension and gravity. The water surface has a dampening effect which causes an abnormal dispersion pattern in which waves decrease in amplitude, speed and frequency with distance from the source. Short-wavelength (higher frequency) waves disperse faster than longer wavelength waves, resulting in higher frequencies at the front of the wave-train and lower frequencies at the tail; a fish detects this as a downward-sweeping frequency modulation.

== Surface wave detection in Aplocheilus lineatus ==
A vast amount of the research on surface wave detection has been done in the surface-feeding topminnow/killfish Aplocheilus lineatus. Schwartz (1965) demonstrated that this species has exceptionally well-developed surface wave detection ability, and it is easily housed and trained in laboratories. Pantadon bucholzi (a surface dwelling butterfly fish) is used less often though is very similar in its anatomy and behavior. The rest of this article will focus on research done with A lineatus.

=== Experimental methodology ===
(See the work of Bleckmann, Schwartz, Müller, etc., 1965-present).

The experimental setup for testing A lineatus' abilities is very standardized. Subject fish are often blinded so that visual cues cannot be used. Stimuli are delivered to the surface of the water in a test tank via one of two methods (experimenters often use both): for the first, a loudspeaker is set up facing the water surface, while a plastic disc covers the front of the speaker cone with a small hole in the center, allowing air to be pushed through the hole to stimulate the water surface in a pattern controlled by a square-wave generator. Alternatively, a small rod a few millimeters in diameter is dipped briefly a few centimeters into the water. Either setup can be moved around the tank to deliver stimuli at various locations. The loudspeaker setup offers the advantage that stimuli can be precisely controlled to mimic natural stimuli or to test certain wave properties.

Wave characteristics are measured optically. This is done by shining a laser (often helium-neon) at the water surface. Reflections and distortions of the laser's beam are picked up by a photodiode.

Fishes' movements are videotaped with a high-speed camera from above the testing tank so that the precise timing and nature of their responses' to stimuli can be reviewed.

=== Behavior of A lineatus ===
Aplocheilus lineatus assumes a hunting posture at the water surface in which it holds the top of its head within 200 μm of the water surface. On perception of appropriate wave stimuli, fish first turn towards the stimulus. This initial turn is made within 150ms of the wavetrain's arrival to the fish. Fish then swim to the wave's source. There are specific parameters for wave stimuli to be perceived which reflect the type of waves produced by prey. Fish are least sensitive to low frequencies, with a minimum threshold of 10 Hz and have peak sensitivity at 75–150 Hz; the highest frequency they can detect is 250 Hz. These waves have small amplitudes (on a micrometer-scale), and fish can detect waves with minimum peak-to-peak displacement of 1 μm at 10 Hz and 0.0007μm in their most sensitive range of 75–100 Hz. Fish are also sensitive to waves generated within 7–30 cm of the fish's location, though they can occur at any point within that radius. Because the water surface acts as a low pass filter, this radius is different for different wave frequencies: 70 Hz waves with 100μm peak-to-peak distance are subthreshold at 37 cm, and 140 Hz waves are subthreshold at 19 cm. Fish are able to tell apart concurrent waves of different frequencies when the frequencies are different by at least 15%, though at certain frequencies this difference can be as low as 8%.

The wave-detection system of A lineatus and other surface feeding fish is tuned to match the waves that signal prey in their environment. A lineatus feeds on aquatic, semi-aquatic and terrestrial insects, often insects that have just touched the surface of the water or have fallen in and are struggling at the surface. Abiotic sources give off capillary waves of frequency 8–14 Hz, while biotic sources give off much higher frequencies, anywhere from 12–45 Hz and above. This correlates well with A lineatus' peak sensitivity at higher frequencies.

Wave stimuli are classified into two types: the first is click stimuli (short bursts of amplitude less than 100μm which contain many frequencies between 5 Hz and 190 Hz and are of short duration, as when an insect just touches the water rather than moves continuously at the surface). The other is continuous wave stimuli, which will contain many frequencies and in the wild are generated by fallen prey struggling at the water surface.

It has been pointed out that A lineatus and other surface feeding fish are able to locate prey even if the waveform is only in click form (just touching the surface once, as when surfacing for air or when a mosquito larva is hatching), which takes less time to complete than the fish will take to swim over. This indicates that the fish are simply performing a form of sensory taxis, that they are getting all the information they need to locate the prey in the initial stimulus reception and are retaining the location while orienting and swimming. Fish also can begin orienting and swimming after receiving only the first few waves in a wavetrain or click stimulus.

=== Directional orientation ===
When stimuli are presented within a detectable range, orientations toward the stimulus by A lineatus are extremely precise: the response is almost perfect with angles up to 150° in either direction from forwards, and precision falls off but not much when waves come from the rear of the fish.

There is some disagreement in the field about how A lineatus determines the direction of a stimulus. A common suggestion is that an animal performs a ray tracing calculation, similar to what human oceanographers use to locate ocean storms without a satellite. Theoretically, an animal could compare the arrival times of a wavetrain at two neuromasts, effectively measuring the curvature of the wavefront (the farther away the fish is from the source, the less arc angle will be measured in the distance between the neuromasts). However, there is no evidence of a neural circuit that performs this calculation, and other researchers suggest that the distance between any pair of surface wave neuromasts is too small (A lineatus's head is only 1 cm wide) for the calculation to be made accurately, and then at distances from the stimulus less than 7 cm. The accuracy predicted by a time-difference mechanism (using triangulation of the wave source based on curvature of wave front) doesn't match actual accuracy. Additionally it has been shown that if all neuromasts are removed except for one, direction detection still occurs to some degree,

An alternative theory is that individual neuromasts have a preferred direction, that is they are most sensitive to waves coming from a particular direction. A comparison of activation levels of different neuromasts is a relatively easy neural calculation to perform.

When neuromasts are removed unilaterally, fish still turn towards the side the stimulus came from though overestimate the angle by an average of 21° towards the side with intact neuromasts. In this situation, fish often make two turns, first towards the side with intact neuromasts and then back towards the other.

Each neuromast has a preferred direction. This was shown in 1970 through ablation of all but one neuromast: fish then usually turned towards one range of directions regardless of where the stimulus came from. The direction sensitivity, as revealed via electrophysiology, shows a cosine function describing receptor firing intensity: accuracy depends on receptor orientation and arrangement and intensity-difference threshold.

In 2011 it was shown that there are certain fleshy ridges around each neuromast that direct water flow. When these ridges were removed, the receptive field for each neuromast was much wider than that with intact ridges; this was shown with electrophysiology. The same experiment also showed that adding ridges to neuromasts that did not previously have ridges also altered the receptive fields for those neuromasts. This suggests that local water flow is important in direction detection.

=== Distance detection ===
A lineatus and other surface wave detecting fish have a limited range in which they can detect surface waves. The ratio of source distance/swim distance ranges between 0.84 and 1.20, and the means range from 0.98 to 1.07. This translates to an accuracy of 85% or higher when stimuli are 6–19 cm from the fish, decreasing to 76% at 14 cm. As the wave source gets farther from a fish, the fish's ability to accurately determine distance decreases until it can no longer detect the waves.

A lineatus uses the shape of the waveform to determine distance by analyzing how much the waveform has changed since it was generated; this amount of change is extremely predictable and regular. The surface waveform has high frequencies near source, and lower frequencies farther away due to the dampening effect of the water surface; the amount of decrease diminishes with distance. A lineatus' possible use of the wavefront's curvature can be excluded since fish are still able to judge the distance of a wave's source with only a single functioning neuromast when all others have been ablated. When presented with single-frequency or upward frequency-modulated waves, fish underestimate the distance of the wave source; this suggests the normal downward FM of capillary waves, which arises almost immediately in wave dispersion, is necessary for A lineatus to judge distance. This was confirmed in 1982 by presenting fish with waves with an artificially generated waveform so that at 7 cm the wave had the downward FM sweep of a wave 15 cm away, and fish responded to these by swimming 15 cm.

The neuro-anatomical basis for this ability has not yet been identified.

=== Anatomy ===
A lineatus and similar surface feeding fish (e.g. Pantadon bucholzi) use a slightly modified lateral line organ called a neuromast to detect surface waves. A lineatus has 18 neuromasts (specialized vibration-sensitive lateral line organs) on the dorsal surface of the head of A lineatus. These are organized into three groups by longitudinal position, and each group is bilaterally symmetric. The groups are, caudal to rostral: nasal/infraorbital (I), supraorbital (II), and supratemporal/post-orbital (III).

Each neuromast is a cluster of hair-cell bundles arranged in a line and numbering in the 10s to 100s. Each bundle of hair cells is covered in a gelatinous capulla which the capillary waves actually make contact with and in doing so cause afferent neurons to fire. Neuromasts are similar in structure to canal organs in the lateral line canal system: they are housed in sacs of connective tissue between the skull and skin, and are connected to the water and water surface via canals and canal pores. Recent work has also revealed small ridges of tissue around each neuromast which direct water flow around it.

The neuroanatomy beyond the receptor level for surface wave-detecting neuromasts has been minimally investigated. In this regard what research has been done shows considerable variation between species; in A lineatus, these neuromasts are considered the supraorbital line, and are innervated by ramus opthalmicus superficialis. This tract results in collateral fibers that innervate the rostral boundary of the medial octavolateralis nucleus, the area in all teleosts where lateral line organs innervate. These afferents also go to the valvula cerebelli.

In one of the few electrophysiology studies performed on A lineatus, it was found that of all the primary afferents from neuromasts that they recorded, half phase-locked to wave stimuli. These neurons had weaker ongoing activity than non-phase-locked neurons. With waves of decreasing amplitude, phase-locking also decreased. Phase-locking was best in the 40–70 Hz range or in the 80–100 Hz range. Within a neuromast different afferents phase-locked best to waves of different frequencies and amplitudes, and they found no correlation between a unit's dynamic amplitude range and its ability to phase lock. Analysis of data revealed that wave amplitude of waves was encoded in the degree of phase-locking and in the afferent's firing rate. Since this was the extent of the feature representation found, it was concluded that further analysis of waves must happen at higher levels in the nervous system.

== Amphibians ==
The African clawed frog (Xenopus laevis) responds to surface waves. It is able to locate wave directions at least to within ± 5° and they can localize and distinguish between two different water waves coming simultaneously from two insects in different directions. Xenopus has approximately 200 lateral-line organs located along the sides of its body, and also around its eyes, head and neck. It is claimed these are used to navigate and detect prey either striking the water or struggling but the role of these organs in surface wave detection is not entirely clear; Xenopus with all of their lateral line organs destroyed are still able to respond to surface waves in an oriented fashion. Compared to animals with an intact system they respond somewhat less accurately to anterior stimuli and much less accurately to stimuli from behind. Areas of the Xenopus brain responding to surface waves have been identified.

It has been speculated that both Xenopus and the European grassfrog use their seismic sensory capabilities to locate conspecifics in breeding ponds.

== Arachnids ==
Dolomedes spiders hunt by waiting at the edge of a pool or stream. They hold on to the shore with their back legs while the rest of their body lies on the water, with legs stretched out. When they detect the ripples from prey, they run across the surface to subdue it using their foremost legs, which are tipped with small claws; like other spiders they then inject venom with their hollow jaws to kill and digest the prey. They mainly eat insects, but some larger species are able to catch small fish.

Females of the water spider Argyroneta aquatica build underwater "diving bell" webs which they fill with air and use for digesting prey, molting, mating and raising offspring. They live almost entirely within the bells, darting out to catch prey animals that touch the bell or the threads that anchor it.

== Other species ==
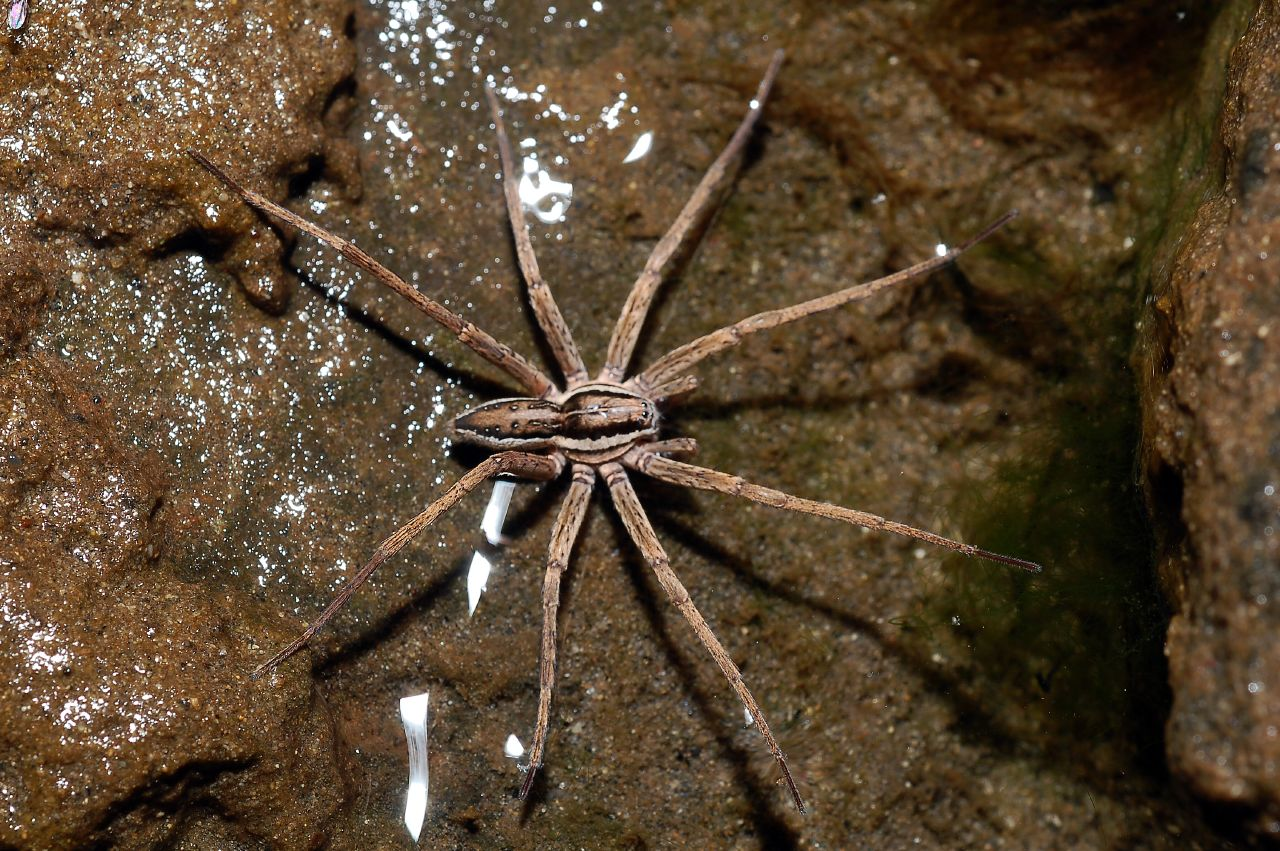
A male shows the typical hunting stance of the fishing spider, Dolomedes minor

Certain other animals also use surface waves to find prey. An incomplete list follows:

Fish:

- Freshwater hatchetfish (Gasteropelecidae)
- Halfbeaks (Hemiramphidae)

Non-fish:

- The genera of spiders Pirata and Dolomedes
- Clawed toad Xenopus laevis
- Whirligig beetle Gyrinus substriatus
- Water strider Gerris remigis
- Back swimmer Notonecta glauca

== See also ==
- Seismic communication
