= Ceylon killifish =

Scientific classification
- Kingdom: Animalia
- Phylum: Chordata
- Class: Actinopterygii
- Order: Cyprinodontiformes
- Family: Aplocheilidae
- Genus: Aplocheilus
- Species: A. dayi

Binomial name
- Aplocheilus dayi Steindachner, 1892

Species of fish

The Ceylon killifish (Sinhala: උඩ හඳයා, romanized: uda handaya; Aplocheilus dayi) is a species of killifish endemic to Sri Lanka. It grows to a length of 9 cm (3.5 in). Males and females have a black dot at the rear end of the base of the dorsal fin. Females lay 50–150 eggs. The specific name of this fish honours the Inspector-General of Fisheries in India Francis Day (1829–1889), who first reported this fish, although he identified it as Aplocheilus panchax.
