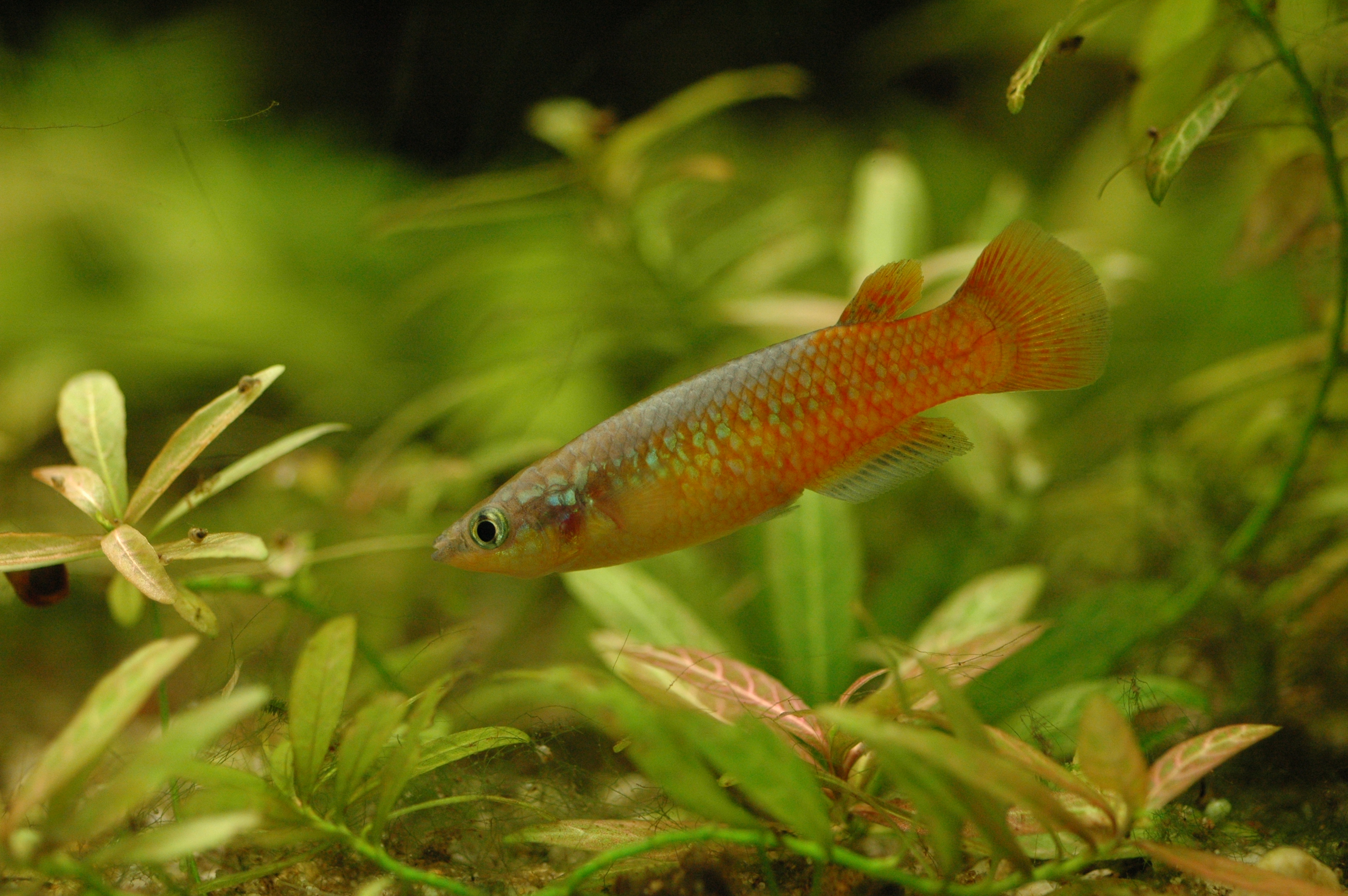

Conservation status
- Endangered (IUCN 3.1)

Scientific classification
- Kingdom: Animalia
- Phylum: Chordata
- Class: Actinopterygii
- Order: Cyprinodontiformes
- Family: Aplocheilidae
- Genus: Pachypanchax
- Species: P. omalonotus

Binomial name
- Pachypanchax omalonotus (A. H. A. Duméril, 1861)

Synonyms
- Poecilia omalonota Duméril, 1861; Aplocheilus omalonotus (Duméril, 1861); Poecilia nuchimaculata Guichenot, 1866; Haplochilus nuchimaculatus (Guichenot, 1866); Pachypanchax nuchimaculatus (Guichenot, 1866); Panchax nuchimaculatus (Guichenot, 1866)

= Pachypanchax omalonotus =

Species of fish

Pachypanchax omalonotus, the powder-blue panchax, is a species of Aplocheilid killifish endemic to Madagascar where it is found on the island of Nosy Be and in the Sambirano River basin and adjacent streams on the mainland. Its natural habitat is rivers.
