= List of hospitals in Gampaha District =

The following is a list of hospitals in Gampaha District, Sri Lanka. The biggest government hospitals in the district, known as line ministry hospitals, are controlled by the central government in Colombo. All other government hospitals in the district are controlled by the provincial government in Colombo.

== Government hospitals ==
=== Central government hospitals ===
==== Teaching hospitals ====
- Colombo North Teaching Hospital, Ragama
- National Hospital for Respiratory Diseases (Welisara Chest Hospital), Welisara
- Rheumtology and Rehabilitation Hospital, Ragama

==== Divisional hospitals (type A) ====
- Kandana Divisional Hospital, Kandana

==== Primary medical care units ====
- Vijaya Kumaratunga Memorial Hospital, Seeduwa

==== Other central government hospitals ====
- Air Force Hospital, SLAF Katunayake, Katunayake
- Mahara Prison Hospital, Mahara

=== Provincial government hospitals ===
==== District general hospitals ====
- Gampaha District General Hospital, Gampaha
- Negombo District General Hospital (Negombo Base Hospital), Negombo

==== Base hospitals (type A) ====
- Wathupitiwala Base Hospital, Wathupitiwala

==== Base hospitals (type B) ====
- Kiribathgoda base Hospital, Kelaniya
- Mirigama Base Hospital, Mirigama
- Minuwangoda base hospital (minuwangoda)

==== Divisional hospitals (type A) ====
- Divulapitiya Divisional Hospital, Divulapitiya
- Dompe Divisional Hospital, Dompe

==== Divisional hospitals (type B) ====
- Radawana Divisional Hospital, Radawana

==== Divisional hospitals (type C) ====
- Akaragama Divisional Hospital, Akaragama
- Ja-Ela Divisional Hospital, Ja-Ela
- Pamunugama Divisional Hospital, Pamunugama

== Private hospitals ==
- Arogya Hospital, Gampaha
- Ave Maria Hospital, Negombo
- Bandaranayake Hospital, Wathupitiwala
- Cooperative Hospital, Gampaha
- Dissanayeke Hospital, Negombo
- Hemas Hospital, Wattala
- Ja-Ela Ragama Hospitals (Pvt) Ltd, Ja-Ela
- Leesons Hospital, Ragama
- Melsta Hospital, Ragama
- Nawaloka Hospital, Negombo
- Nawaloka Medicare, Gampaha
- Negombo Health Care Private Hospital, Negombo
- Peoples Hospital, Mahabage
- Q WELL Health Care Private

 Hospital Makola

- Radiant Eye Hospital, Ja-Ela
- Sethma Hospital, Gampaha
- Sirisanda Hospital, Nittambuwa
- St. George's Hospital, Biyagama
- St. Josephs Hospital, Negombo
- Suwasarana Hospital, Ragama
- Suwa Sewana Hospital, Yakkala
- Viweka Hospital, Veyangoda

== See also ==
- List of hospitals in Sri Lanka
