= List of hospitals in Colombo District =

The following is a list of hospitals in Colombo District, Sri Lanka. The biggest government hospitals in the district, known as line ministry hospitals, are controlled by the central government in Colombo. All other government hospitals in the district are controlled by the provincial government in Colombo.

== Government hospitals ==
=== Central government hospitals ===
==== National hospital ====
- National Hospital of Sri Lanka, Colombo

==== Teaching hospitals ====
- Castle Street Hospital for Women, Colombo
- Colombo South Teaching Hospital, Kalubowila
- Dental Institute, Colombo
- De Soysa Hospital for Women (De Soysa Maternity Hospital), Colombo
- Lady Ridgeway Hospital for Children, Colombo
- National Cancer Institute, Maharagama
- National Eye Hospital, Colombo
- National Institute of Mental Health (Angoda Mental Hospital), Angoda
- Sri Jayawardenepura General Hospital, Sri Jayawardenepura

==== Base hospitals (type A) ====
- Infectious Disease Hospital (Fever Hospital), Angoda

==== Base hospitals (type B) ====
- Mulleriyawa Base Hospital (Colombo East General Hospital), Mulleriyawa

==== Other central government hospitals ====
- Borella Prison Hospital, Borella
- Colombo Military Hospital, Colombo
- Colomb Naval Hospital, SLNS Parakrama, Colombo
- Panagoda Base Hospital, Panagoda Cantonment
- Police Hospital, Colombo

=== Provincial government hospitals ===
==== Base hospitals (type A) ====
- Avissawella Base Hospital, Avissawella
- Homagama Base Hospital, Homagama

==== Divisional hospitals (type A) ====
- Piliyandala Divisional Hospital, Piliyandala
- Moratuwa District Hospital, Moratuwa
- Wetara District Hospital, Polgasowita

==== Divisional hospitals (type B) ====
- Koswatta Divisional Hospital, Thalangama
- Padukka Divisional Hospital, Padukka

==== Divisional hospitals (type C) ====
- Maligawatta District Hospital (Premadasa Memorial Hospital), Maligawatta
- Kosgama Divisional Hospital, Salawa

== Private hospitals ==
- Asiri Hospital, Colombo
- Durdans Hospital, Colombo
- Nawaloka Hospital, Colombo
- Lanka Hospitals, Colombo
- Hemas Hospital, Thalawathugoda
- Kings Hospital, Colombo
- Neville Fernando Teaching Hospital, Malabe
- Vasana Hospital, Dehiwala, Colombo
- Pannipitiya Private Hospital, Pannipitiya
- Santa Dora Hospital, Battaramulla
- The Singapore Clinic for Dialysis
- Sulaiman's Hospital (Grandpass Maternity & Nursing Home)
- Vasan Eye Care Hospital, Colombo
- Western Hospital, Colombo

Suwasarana Medicare Homoeopathic treatment Pugoda Road Dekatana

- Inter National Research Institute of Homoeopathy Ramakrishnan street Colombo

German Treatment centre Station Road Ja-eka

== See also ==
- List of hospitals in Sri Lanka
