= Pachypanchax sp. nov. 'Sofia' =

Conservation status
- Data Deficient (IUCN 3.1)

Scientific classification
- Kingdom: Animalia
- Phylum: Chordata
- Class: Actinopterygii
- Order: Cyprinodontiformes
- Family: Aplocheilidae
- Genus: Pachypanchax
- Species: P. sp. nov. 'Sofia'

Binomial name
- Pachypanchax sp. nov. 'Sofia'

Species of fish

Pachypanchax sp. nov. 'Sofia' is a species of fish in the family Aplocheilidae. It is endemic to Madagascar. Its natural habitat is rivers.
