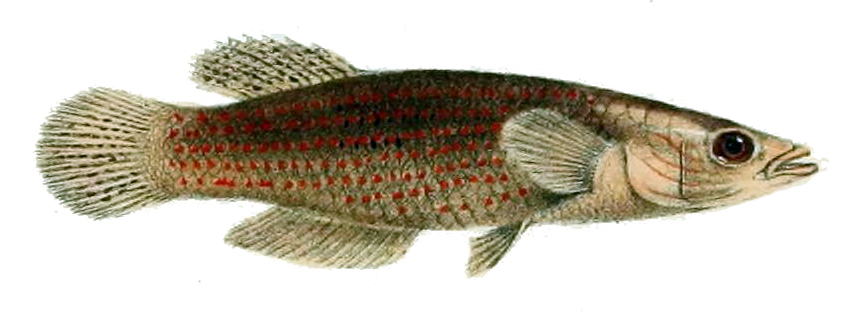

Conservation status
- Data Deficient (IUCN 3.1)

Scientific classification
- Kingdom: Animalia
- Phylum: Chordata
- Class: Actinopterygii
- Order: Cyprinodontiformes
- Family: Aplocheilidae
- Genus: Pachypanchax
- Species: P. playfairii

Binomial name
- Pachypanchax playfairii (Günther, 1866)

Synonyms
- Haplochilus playfairii (Günther, 1866); Pachypanchax playfairi (Günther, 1866); Panchax playfairii (Günther, 1866)

= Pachypanchax playfairii =

Species of fish

Pachypanchax playfairii, the golden panchax, is a species of Aplocheilid killifish, the only species of freshwater fish endemic to the Seychelles, a group of islands in the Indian Ocean, east of Tanzania. It is the only member of its genus found outside of Madagascar. Within the Seychelles it is found only on the granitic islands. Here it occurs in small freshwater and brackish water streams, feeding on worms, crustaceans, insects and fish. An egg scatterer, the golden panchax breeds amongst floating water plants. This species is unusual in that the scales of the male become lifted during the breeding season, giving the skin a rough appearance. Unlike the true annual killifish, they live as long as similar fishes, a few years, 3 years is not uncommon 5 is unknown.

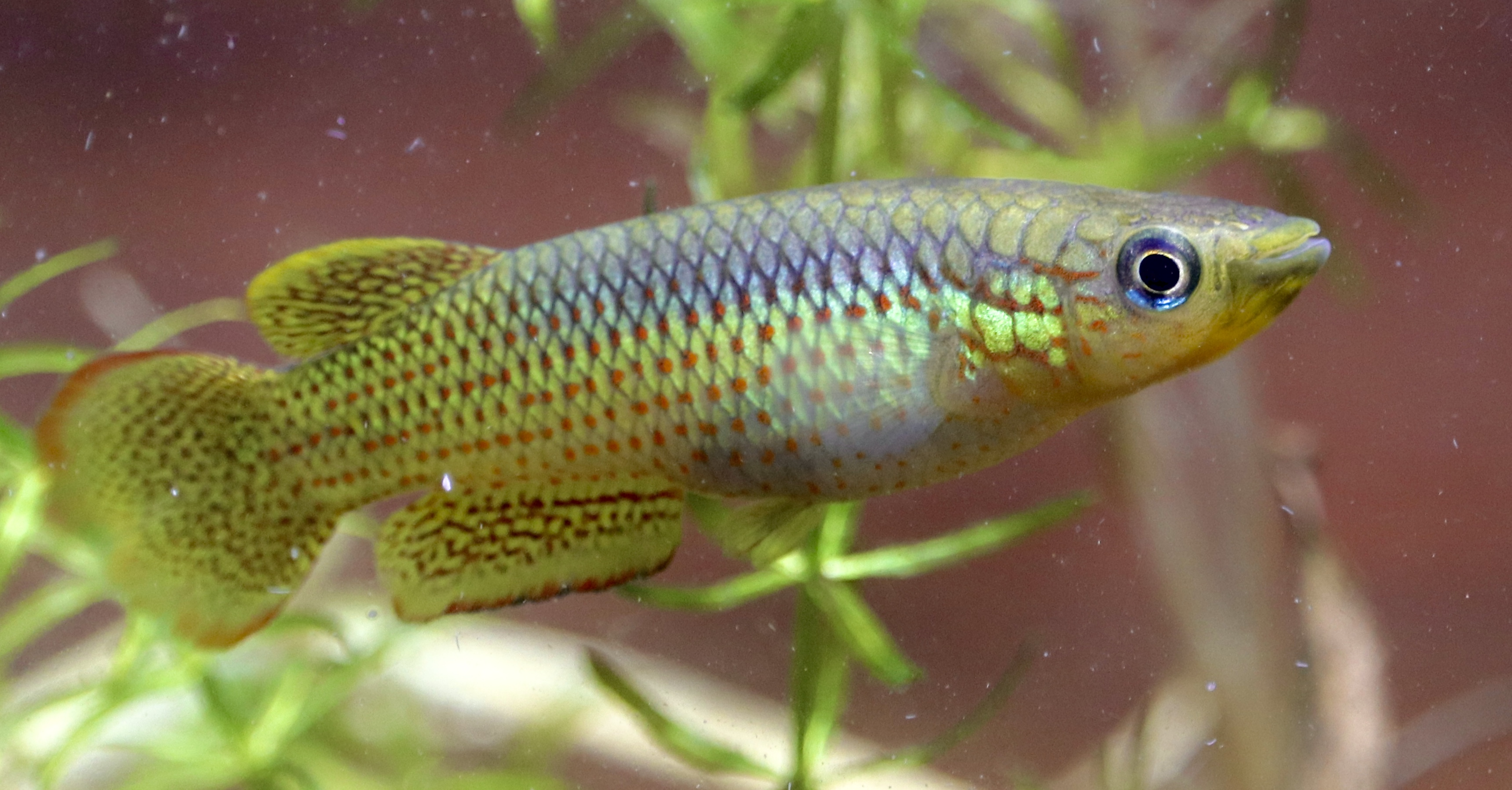
photo Robin G Johnston

Discovered by Robert Lambert Playfair in the Seychelles in 1863, the species was described as Haplocheilus playfairi by Albert Günther in 1866 and were moved to Pachypanchax by George S. Myers in 1933; first kept in aquaria in France in 1867 (but not successfully, they died without reproducing) from a collection by Edward Wright. A population of P. playfairi was moved from The Seychelles to Zanzibar by zoologist Dr. Walter Aders after WWI for mosquito control as a public health initiative where they survived for decades even after being abandoned and at least until after WWII Subsequently, eaten by invasive Tilapia when checked by Wildekamp et al. in 1997 and Nagy in 2008 they are considered extinct on Zanzibar Island now although this population remains in the aquarium hobby, as these were one of the first tropical fish and the first killifish held in the earliest days of the aquarium hobby.
