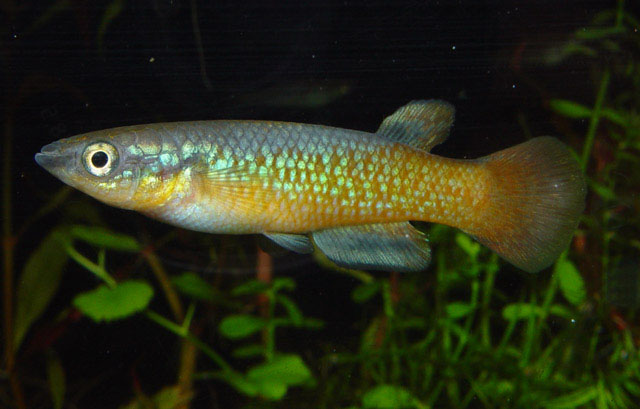

Conservation status
- Endangered (IUCN 3.1)

Scientific classification
- Kingdom: Animalia
- Phylum: Chordata
- Class: Actinopterygii
- Division: Teleostei
- Order: Cyprinodontiformes
- Family: Aplocheilidae
- Genus: Pachypanchax
- Species: P. sakaramyi

Binomial name
- Pachypanchax sakaramyi (Holly, 1928)

Synonyms
- Panchax sakaramyi Holly, 1928

= Pachypanchax sakaramyi =

Species of fish

Pachypanchax sakaramyi is a species of Aplocheilid killifish endemic to Madagascar where it is only known from Sakaramy and Antongombato Rivers with reports that it is found in several crater lakes. Its natural habitats are rivers and freshwater lakes. It is threatened by habitat loss and invasive species.

== Sources ==
- Loiselle, P. 2006. A review of the Malagasy Pachypanchax (Teleostei: Cyprinodontiformes, Aplocheilidae), with descriptions of four new species. Zootaxa 1366: 1–44 (2006)
- Froese, Rainer; Pauly, Daniel (eds.). "Pachypanchax sakaramyi". FishBase. August 2012 version.
