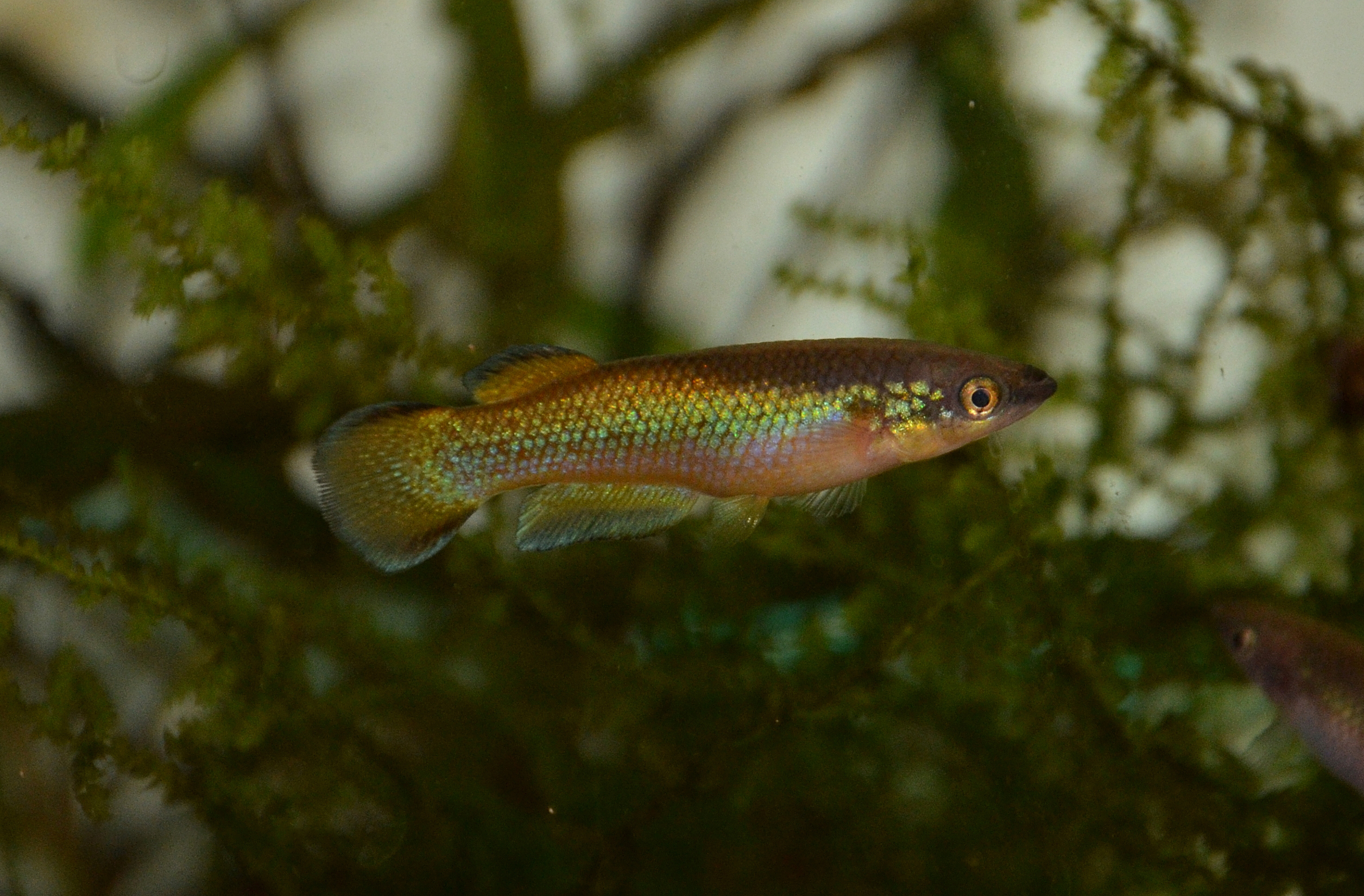

Conservation status
- Endangered (IUCN 3.1)

Scientific classification
- Kingdom: Animalia
- Phylum: Chordata
- Class: Actinopterygii
- Order: Cyprinodontiformes
- Family: Aplocheilidae
- Genus: Pachypanchax
- Species: P. patriciae

Binomial name
- Pachypanchax patriciae Loiselle, 2006

= Pachypanchax patriciae =

Species of fish

Pachypanchax patriciae is a species of killifish from the family Aplocheilidae. It is endemic to Madagascar where it occurs in the basins of the Mananjeba, Mahavavy du Nord, Ifasy, Manehoko, and Ampandra rivers in the north west of the island. The specific name of this fish honours the Malagasy conservationist Patricia Yazgi (1946-2006), who ran the charity Friends of Fishes and who supported efforts to document and conserve the freshwater fish fauna of Madagascar. This species appears to feed mainly the adults and nymphs of terrestrial insects and on the larvae of aquatic insects and its most important predators are fish-eating birds and dragonfly nymphs. It may, however, be threatened by introduced alien fishes in some areas.
