= Pachypanchax sparksorum =

Conservation status
- Endangered (IUCN 3.1)

Scientific classification
- Kingdom: Animalia
- Phylum: Chordata
- Class: Actinopterygii
- Order: Cyprinodontiformes
- Family: Aplocheilidae
- Genus: Pachypanchax
- Species: P. sparksorum

Binomial name
- Pachypanchax sparksorum Loiselle, 2006

Species of fish

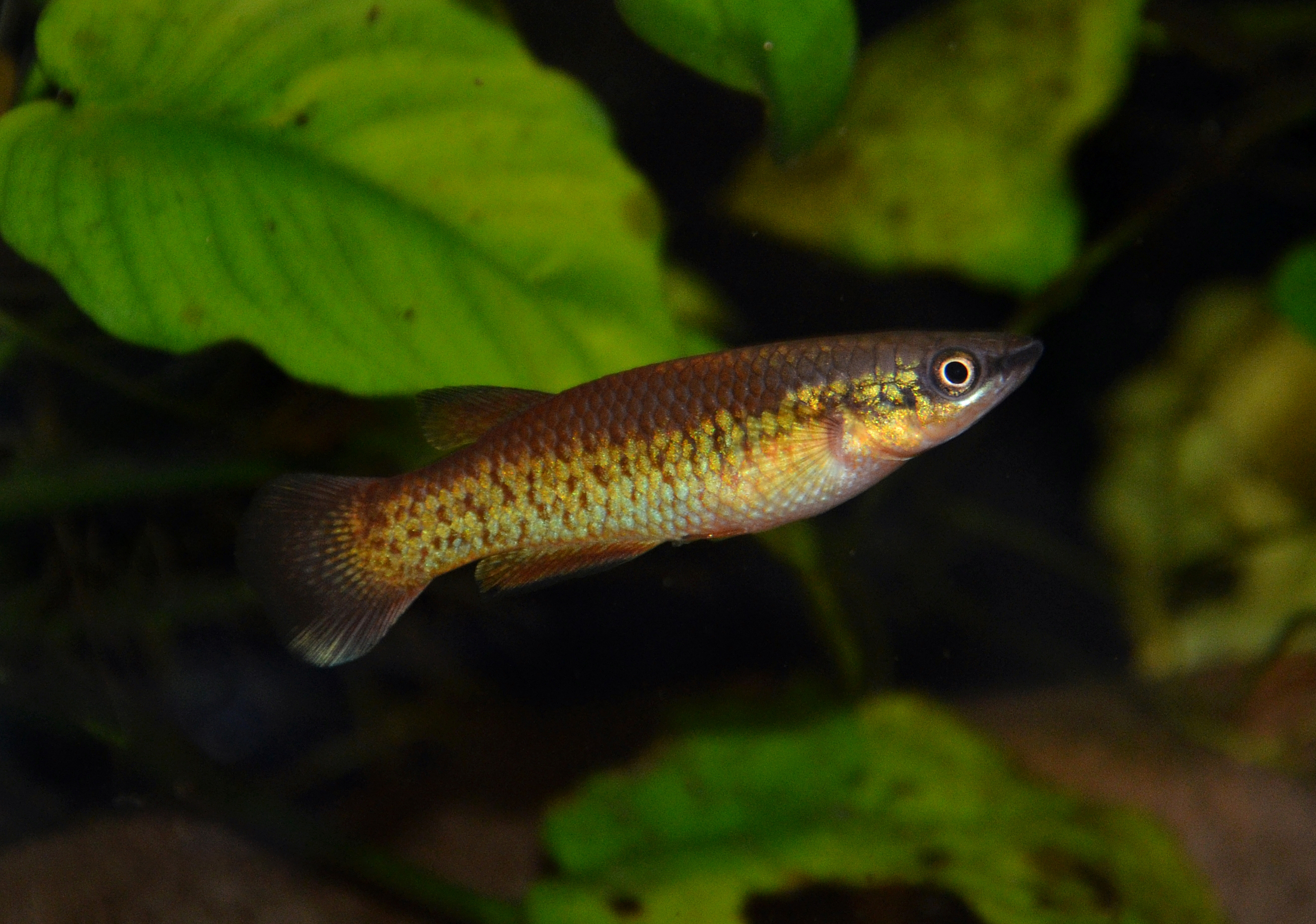
Pachypanchax sparksorum, juvenile male

Pachypanchax sparksorum is a species of Aplocheilid killifish endemic to Madagascar where it is found in the Anjingo River and streams feeding into the Ankofia River. Its natural habitat is rivers. The specific name of this fish honours the ichthyologist John Stephen Sparks of the United States National Museum and his wife Karen Riseng Sparks, they collected many of the type series.
