= Muthurajawela wetlands =

- Wetlands
- Location: Sri Lanka

Area
  - Total: 3,068 hectares (7,580 acres)

The Muthurajawela wetlands are a marsh on the Sri Lanka south of Negombo Lagoon and 20 kilometres (12 mi) north of Colombo. It covers 3,068 ha (7,580 acres) and is the country's largest saline coastal peat bog. In 1996, 1,777 ha (4,390 acres) of the northern part of the marsh was declared a wetland sanctuary by the government, under the Flora and Fauna Protection Act in recognition of its vast bio-diversity. It is one of 12 priority wetlands in Sri Lanka.

== History ==
The marsh is believed to have originated about 5000 BC. Four hundred years ago, the area was an "alluvial flood plain and fertile paddy land." They were developed by Sinhalese kings who "diverted the drainage waters from the sloping lands". Then the Portuguese arrived and were eventually bequeathed the kingdom of Kotte, which included the region. They dug a canal, letting in sea water to inundate the fields.

== Flora and fauna ==
The region supports 192 flora and 209 fauna species, some indigenous to the marsh.

There are 75, 102 or 103 bird species, including the:

- Asian openbill stork
- bittern
  - black bittern
  - chestnut bittern
  - yellow bittern
- cormorant
  - Indian cormorant
  - little cormorant
- duck
  - lesser whistling teal
- egret
  - cattle egret
  - intermediate egret
  - large egret
  - little egret
- little grebe
- heron
  - purple heron
  - Indian pond heron
  - little green heron
  - black-crowned night heron
- kingfisher
- common moorhen
- painted stork
- pheasant-tailed jacana
- Purple swamphen
- white-breasted waterhen

There are "40 species of fish, 31 species of reptiles, 14 amphibian species, and 22 mammals," including the:

- Asian water monitor
- Indian star tortoise
- macaque monkey
- saltwater crocodile
- slender loris
- dwarf panchax
- pearl spot
- tilapia

== Peat bog ==
The peat is in a layer 3 to 7 metres (9.8 to 23.0 ft) thick. Three types of peat have been identified based on what type of organic material they are composed of.

In 1968, a United Nations Development Program team, which was actually there to determine the hydroelectric potential, mentioned that Muthurajawela possessed 50 million tons of peat. Another source gives a figure of five million tons.

== Threats ==
Due in part to its proximity to Colombo, it is under the threat of development and dumping of wastes.

== See also ==
- Kirala Kelle wetlands
- Diyasaru Park
