= Pachypanchax arnoulti =

Conservation status
- Vulnerable (IUCN 3.1)

Scientific classification
- Kingdom: Animalia
- Phylum: Chordata
- Class: Actinopterygii
- Order: Cyprinodontiformes
- Family: Aplocheilidae
- Genus: Pachypanchax
- Species: P. arnoulti

Binomial name
- Pachypanchax arnoulti Loiselle, 2006

Species of fish

Pachypanchax arnoulti is a species of aplocheilid killifish endemic to Madagascar. Its natural habitat is rivers and lakes. It is threatened by habitat loss and invasive species.

== Etymology ==
The specific name of this fish honours the French ichthyologist and herpetologist Jacques Arnoult (1914-1995) in recognition of his contributions to the knowledge of Madagascar's fish fauna.

== Description ==
It was described by Paul V. Loiselle in 2006 with the type locality given as "Swamp draining into tributary stream of Ikopa River, flowing parallel to RN-4 at Antanimbray village, 17°10'79"S, 46°50'97"E, Betsiboka River drainage, Madagascar, elevation 246 meters".
