= Pachypanchax varatraza =

Conservation status
- Endangered (IUCN 3.1)

Scientific classification
- Kingdom: Animalia
- Phylum: Chordata
- Class: Actinopterygii
- Order: Cyprinodontiformes
- Family: Aplocheilidae
- Genus: Pachypanchax
- Species: P. varatraza

Binomial name
- Pachypanchax varatraza Loiselle, 2006

Species of fish

Pachypanchax varatraza is a species of Aplocheilid killifish endemic to Madagascar where it is found in the Menambery, Fanambana and Ampanobe rivers. Its natural habitat is streams and pools. It is threatened by invasive species.
