= Aplocheilus werneri =

Scientific classification
- Domain: Eukaryota
- Kingdom: Animalia
- Phylum: Chordata
- Class: Actinopterygii
- Order: Cyprinodontiformes
- Family: Aplocheilidae
- Genus: Aplocheilus
- Species: A. werneri

Binomial name
- Aplocheilus werneri Meinken, 1966

Species of fish

Aplocheilus werneri (Werner's killifish) is a species of killifish endemic to Sri Lanka. This species grows to a length of 7 cm (2.8 in). Its natural habitats are small, shallow, slow-flowing, heavily shaded streams and rivulets with a silt or clay substrate. They are largely use as an aquarium fish. The specific name honours the fish importer Andreas Werner who imported this species into Germany for the first time in 1964.
