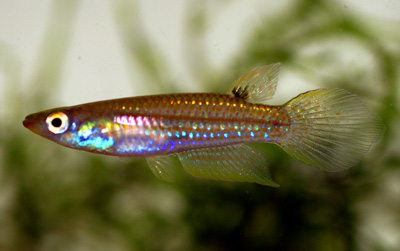

Scientific classification
- Kingdom: Animalia
- Phylum: Chordata
- Class: Actinopterygii
- Order: Cyprinodontiformes
- Family: Aplocheilidae
- Genus: Aplocheilus
- Species: A. parvus

Binomial name
- Aplocheilus parvus (Sundara Raj, 1916)

Synonyms
- Panchax parvus Sundara Raj, 1916; Aplocheilus madrensis (Schermer, 1924)

= Aplocheilus parvus =

Species of fish

Aplocheilus parvus, the dwarf panchax, is a species of killifish native to India and Sri Lanka, and was first identified in 1916 by Sundara Raj. This species grows to a length of 6.3 cm (2.5 in). Its natural habitats are sheltered fresh and brackish water tanks, small streams and rivulets overgrown with vegetation As aquarium fish, they are difficult to maintain but continue to be popular due to their small size and bright coloration. It is often misidentified as other species under the same genus, Aplocheilus. Examples include, Aplocheilus panchax, Aplocheilus blockii, and Aplocheilus dayi.

== Species Description ==
The body size of Aplocheilus parvus can range from 2 cm to 6.3 cm. They have a terminal mouth and their head is flat at the top. Their bodies are slender and elongated, possessing round scales, round fins, and lack barbels. The lack of barbels and large eyes relative to its body indicate it relies primarily on vision to navigate and locate prey. The round caudal fin allows for stability and maneuverability rather than fast movement, as they move through in dense vegetation instead of open waters. The location of their dorsal fin is also closer to the back half of their body and has shiny scales on the lateral sides of the body, which is helpful characteristic to distinguish A. parvus from A. dayi.

This species is sexually dimorphic, so the morphology of males and females slightly differ. Males are larger and more colorful with black spots and iridescent green spots on their sides, whereas females are plainer colored. Males also lack elongated pelvic fins and have a pointed anal fin, while females have rounded anal fins. There is also morphological variation of A. parvus in Sri Lanka and India. Those in India have a more yellow color with red dots and patches around the lateral line. In contrast, those from Sri Lankan regions have a white metallic blotch on top of their heads, have majority silver bodies with hints of yellow and the fins are multi-colored except for their silver pectoral fins.

=== Commonly Mistaken Species ===
A. parvus is often mistaken as Aplocheilus panchax, Aplocheilus blockii, Aplocheilus dayi. To differentiate from other species in the Aplocheilus genus such as A. dayi and A. werneri, A. parvus are typically smaller with a body length of 2 to 4 cm, compared to the 3 to 5 cm body length of A. dayi and the 6 to 9 cm of A. werneri. These 3 species also all have a white-color metallic blotch on their head, but A. parvus have shiny scales on the lateral side of its body. Males have green and red spots on single fins and females have a black dot at the base of their dorsal fin, whereas the other two species have black stripes or spots on the body.

Many factors, such as crossbreeding, can influence morphological traits and result in variation within and between species, making them more difficult to distinguish. Truss analysis (morphological identification) and DNA barcoding (molecular identification) are common methods used to identify and distinguish species between the Aplocheilus genus. Distinguishing by solely physical characters is less reliable, and instead, DNA barcoding has opened the doors to more accurate and effective identification as well as exploring relationships between species. DNA uses a short DNA sequence in the organism to produce a unique "barcode" for precise species identification. A. blockii is the most mistaken species because they look almost identical, but DNA barcoding targeting the COXI gene has revealed a method to differentiate these. Another study revealed through genetic analysis that A. parvus and A. blockii may be a single species, but not enough research and DNA data on A. parvus is present to conclude this.

== Distribution ==
Aplocheilus parvus are indigenous, surface dwelling fish that reside in Peninsular India and Sri Lanka. Because of their feeding habits, they prefer habitats with overhanging cover and surface vegetation to feed on, such as mangroves, paddy fields, swamps, and small streams overgrown with vegetation.They inhabit lentic (still freshwaters) and lotic (fast-moving freshwaters) systems. These areas are located in wet, intermediate, and dry zones, typically in brackish (moderately saline) and fresh waters. Of the Aplocheilus species located in Sri Lanka, A. parvus is the most saline-tolerant, concentrating near coastal areas.

== Life History ==
=== Diet ===
A. parvus are diurnal feeders that prey on adult and larval stages of Insecta (coleoptera, Hymenoptera), Maxillopoda (Copepod), and Malacostraca. These fish are also selective eaters, so regardless of prey scarcity and habitat type, A. parvus will continue to prefer insects and insect larvae. Because of their selective eating habitats, they are considered potential biological controls against harmful insect larvae, such as mosquitos, without needing to introduce potentially invasive species.

Peak feeding times occur midday but differ in abundance of food consumption among sexes. During peak consumption, males consume a lesser amount of prey compared to females. Nutritional intake can affect egg fecundity and quality, so it's possible this occurs to support females during breeding season and improve fitness. As a result, this may vary depending on season and abundance of preferred prey.

=== Reproduction ===
A. parvus prefers dark areas to breed and during the breeding season, males become aggressive to one another in order to fight for females. They lay eggs and attach them to mosses, fine-leaved plants, and algae. Aside from being surface dwellers, this is another reason why they prefer habitats with lots of vegetation. After 10-15 days of incubation, the eggs spawn in batches of about 10-12 eggs every day for multiple days until 150-300 eggs are produced. The large number of eggs produced may contribute to the abundance and commonality of these fish.

== Conservation Status ==
After a 2019 assessment by the IUCN, they concluded that A. parvus is of least concern. Although these fish are common in their native habitat, they are still faced with threats of habitat fragmentation, pollution from farming and mining, and increased competition from introduced exotic species used to combat invasive pests. In general, fish are heavily exposed and vulnerable to pollutants in the water because they have no way to escape or avoid the area. The increase in pollution in aquatic habitats over the years does not help this case. These threats are negatively affecting fish biodiversity all over the world, especially in Sri Lanka.

During the farming season, fish are exposed to pesticides and weedicides. One study found an absence of species of Aplocheilus in downstream areas of paddy fields, that were treated with chemicals. Another study tested A. parvus' sensitivity to carbosulfan (weedicide) and bispyribac-sodium (insecticide), and found damages to gill tissues and nuclei in cells. Liver apoptosis, gill necrosis, and epithelium proliferations were observed. Due to the large surface area of the secondary epithelium, the gill becomes a target and is the first organ to react to pollutants in the environment. Observing the damage of the gill allows us to understand the severity of the pollutants in the environment, but survival to these pollutants may have detrimental effects to future generations if mutated and damaged genes are passed down. These results indicate they are sensitive to pesticides and weedicides. Although we don't see any immediate danger to their population, more monitoring must be done to observe long term effects both to their population and their ability to serve as biological controls to pests.

While not an immediate threat, Aplocheilus fish are popular among pet fish trade and as a result, populations a slightly declining in their native habitats. There are also currently no conservation measures taken in Sri Lanka and not enough information is known in India. It's important to maintain species diversity and establish conservation programs, and to do so, it's necessary to have precise species identification methods beyond differentiating based solely on morphological features, such as DNA barcoding. Enacting policies of protection and management of land, water, and habitats can also be done to better monitor and protect this species.

== Human Uses ==
Malaria is a growing threat to human populations all around the world, but especially in India. Mosquitos responsible for transmitting this disease can however be addressed and reduced at their larval stages through predation. The creation of human-made aquatic habitats is also contributing to the increase in breeding and production of mosquito larvae. Because of the selective feeding habits and preference for insect larvae, A. parvus are considered a potentially valuable resource to control the populations of mosquitos by preying on their larvae. Using A. parvus as a biological control may be beneficial in reducing the trickle-down effects that introduced exotic species and chemical control methods have on existing organisms in the habitat. While this method may temporarily reduce the mosquito population, the longevity of this method is not known and there is not enough research to determine how reducing mosquito population affects malaria transmission. In other words, using fish as a biological controls shouldn't be relied on and solely used to reduce malaria transmission until more research is conducted.
