= Kirala Kelle wetlands =

Wetlands in Sri Lanka

Matara District, Sri Lanka

The Kirila Kelle wetlands are found a short distance inland from the southern Sri Lankan city of Matara. The wetlands are a part of the Nilwala River basin. They comprise some 750 acres of wetlands. Canals were built by Portuguese Colonialists to mitigate flooding of the Nilwala river into Matara township and aid in the cropping of a further surrounding 6000 acres of rice and other farming. A failed attempt at flood mitigation in the early 1990s has meant that the once arable 6000 acres has now become un-farmable. This reduction in historically arable land has resulted in widespread poverty and associated social and environmental problems for some 35,000 people.

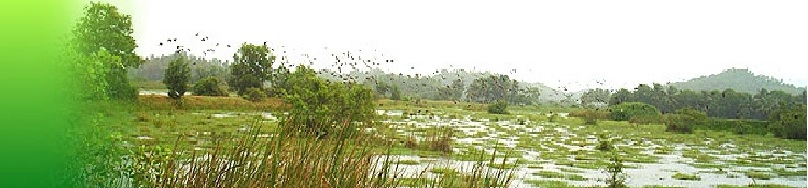

The Kirila Kelle Wetlands are the focus for a sustainable Environmental Conservation Community Development program. This is being developed through Ecotourism and community development, by way of a provincial integrated development strategy, that is managed and implemented by the community for the community.

== See also ==
- Muthurajawela wetlands
- Diyasaru Park
