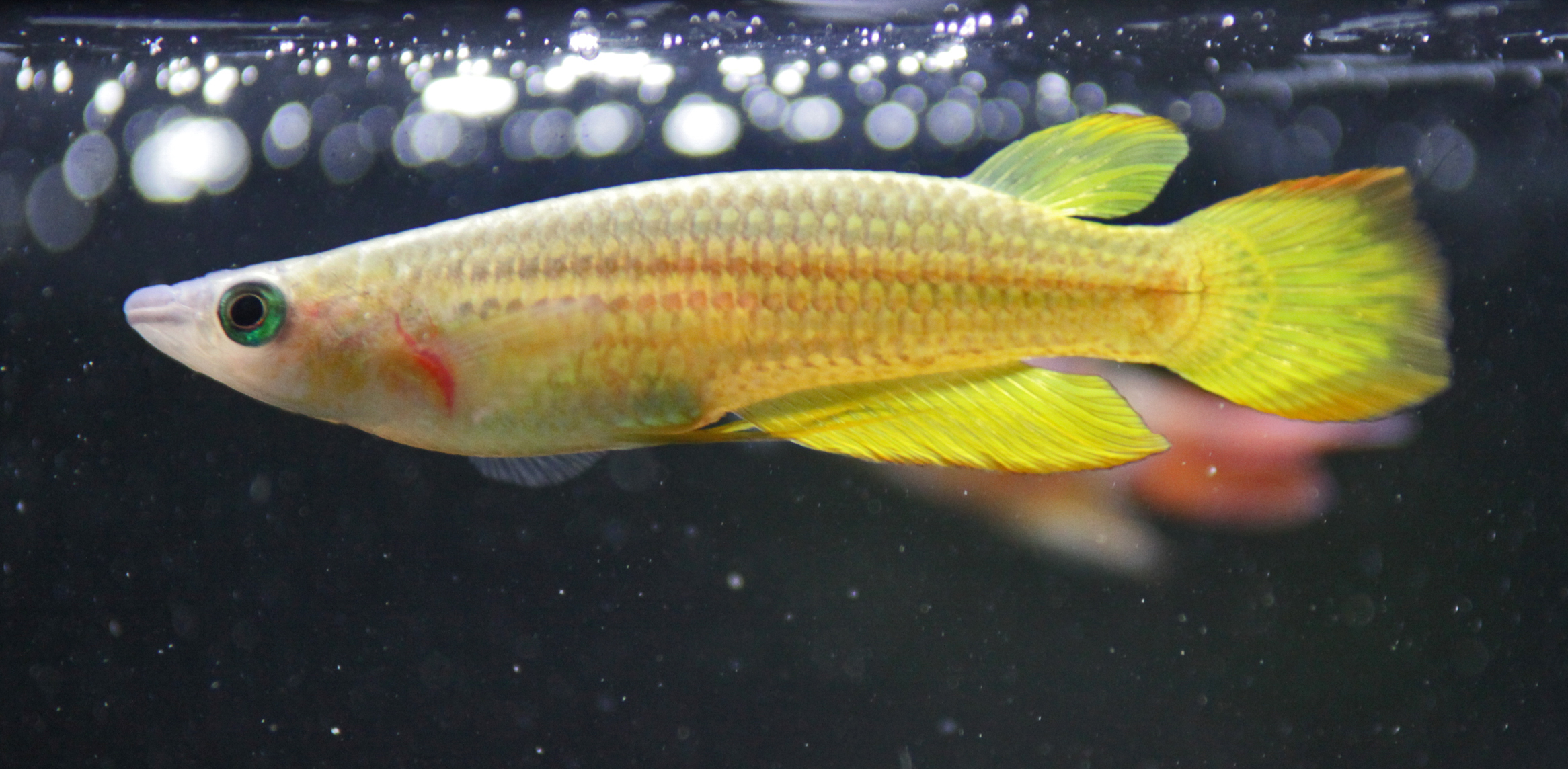
- Striped panchax (A. lineatus) of the golden variant

Scientific classification
- Kingdom: Animalia
- Phylum: Chordata
- Class: Actinopterygii
- Division: Teleostei
- Order: Cyprinodontiformes
- Family: Aplocheilidae
- Genus: Aplocheilus; McClelland, 1839

Type species
- Aplocheilus panchax Hamilton, 1822

Synonyms
- Aplochelus McClelland, 1839 (Misspelling by McClelland); Haplochilus Agassiz, 1846 (Unjustified emendation); Odontopsis van Hasselt, 1823; Panchax Valenciennes, 1846

= Aplocheilus =

Genus of fishes

Aplocheilus is a genus of killifish in the family Aplocheilidae. Their native range is in South and Southeast Asia, from India to Vietnam and Malaysia, and from Nepal to Sri Lanka. Several species, especially the striped panchax, A. lineatus, are important aquarium fishes.

== Etymology ==
The name Aplocheilus is composed of the Greek words aplous meaning "simple, single", and cheilos meaning "lip".

== Species ==
The currently recognized species in this genus are:

- Aplocheilus andamanicus (Köhler, 1906)
- Aplocheilus armatus (van Hasselt, 1823) (Whitespot)
- Aplocheilus blockii J. P. Arnold, 1911 (green panchax)
- Aplocheilus dayi Steindachner, 1892 (Ceylon killifish)
- Aplocheilus kirchmayeri Berkenkamp & Etzel, 1986
- Aplocheilus lineatus (Valenciennes, 1846) (striped panchax)
- Aplocheilus panchax (F. Hamilton, 1822) (blue panchax)
- Aplocheilus parvus (Sundara Raj, 1916) (dwarf panchax)
- Aplocheilus werneri Meinken, 1966 (Werner's killifish)
