= Diyasaru Park =

Diyasaru Park දියසරු උයන
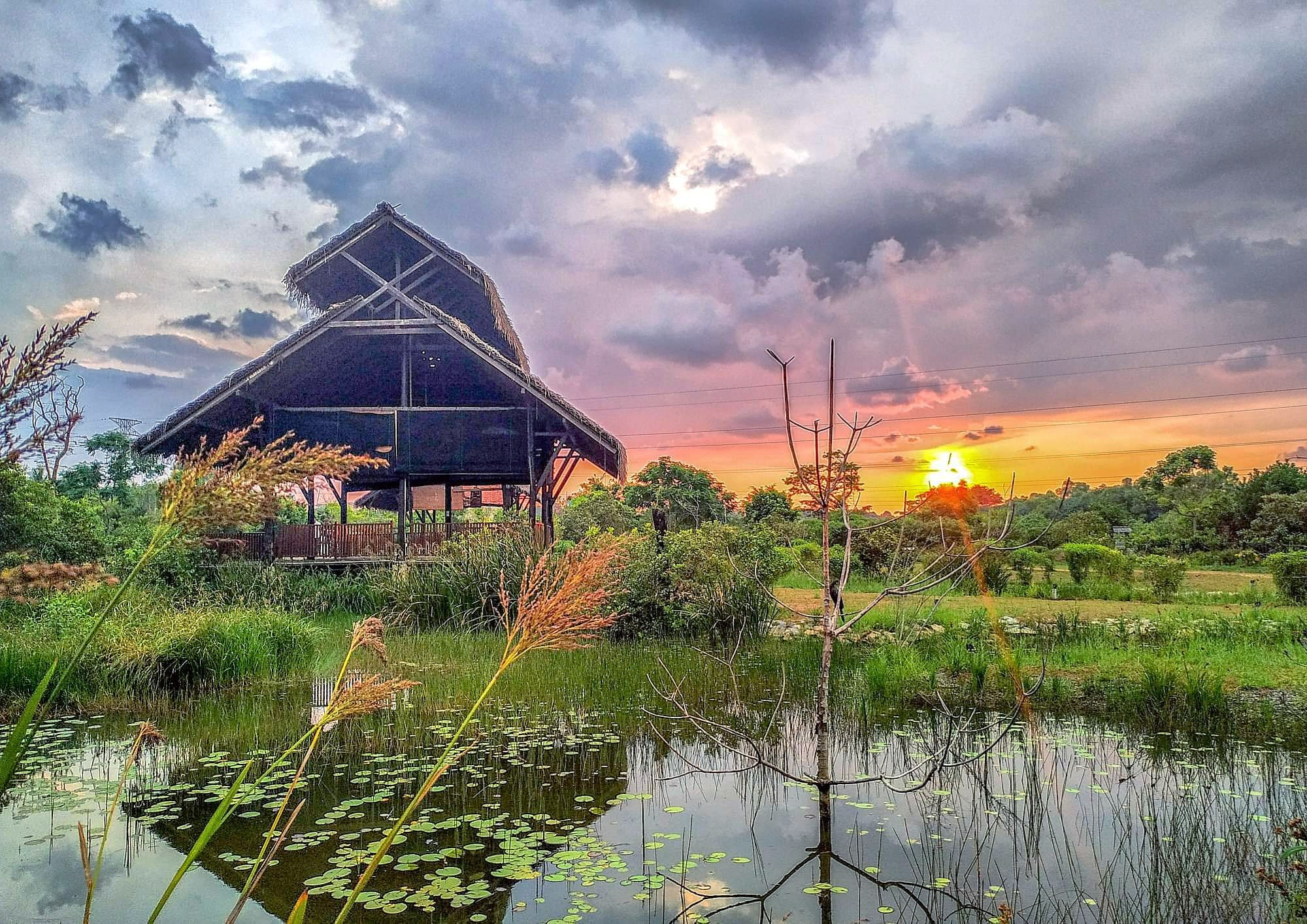
- Interactive map of Diyasaru Park දියසරු උයන
- 6.886826°N 79.91868°E
- Date opened: 3 October 2017
- Location: Thalawathugoda, Colombo, Sri Lanka
- Land area: 60 acres (24 ha)
- No. of species: 230+
- Memberships: Field Ornithology Group of Sri Lanka
- Major exhibits: Mollusks, Arthropods, Vertebrates

Diyasaru Park (formerly known as Thalawathugoda Wetland Park or Thalawathugoda Biodiversity Study Park), is 60 acre urban wetland park located in Thalawathugoda area of Sri Jayawardanapura, Colombo District, Sri Lanka. It comprises a range of wetland habitats such as marshes, flooded woodlands, lakes, and ponds. It is governed by Sri Lanka Land Reclamation and Development Corporation.

The park was officially opened and relaunched to the public on 3 October 2017. It is open 6 days of the week from Monday to Saturday from 6am-6pm.

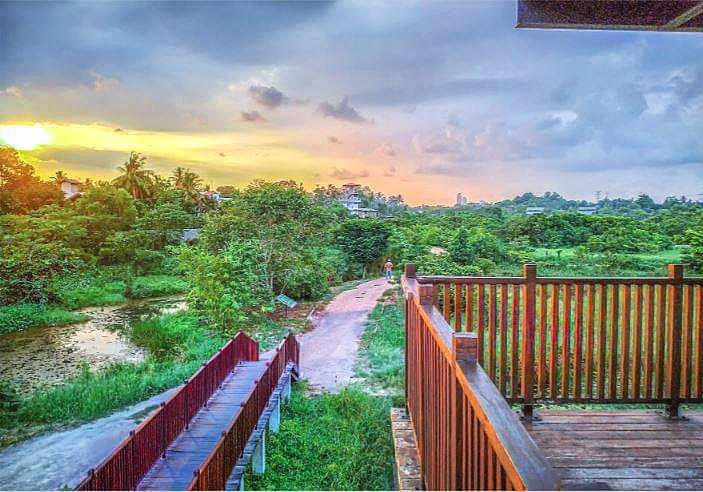

== History ==
Originally in 1980s, the area was a paddy field. Part of the land was used to build the parliament lake in late 1970s. The other part was used to deposit dredge material. Gradually, the land become heavily covered with invasive species and transformed to a wetland. During the flood occur in 2010, government initiated to reconstruct and modify the area as a wetland. The land was divided into several small islands and artificial canals were made.

Currently, park premises serve as a flood detention area by absorbing flood water during heavy storms and reduce inundation of the parliament area. The program to establish the park was initiated by Land Reclamation and Development Cooperation.

The name "Diyasaru" is for 'rich in water' in Sinhala. The vision of the park is “Releasing the Stress of Urbanization”.

== Location ==
The park is an artificially built wetland near new Parliament Complex in Sri Jayawardanapura. It lies hidden behind the Parliament on the Japan Sri Lanka friendship road. It is opposite to Diyawanna Oya where Beddagana Wetland Park is situated.

== Composition ==
The park offers to experience many ecotouristic activities as well as recreational and leisure activities. The park is divided into several sections such with bird watching tower, bird hide, butterfly garden, organic agriculture area, open study area, green buildings, boardwalks, plant nursery, ecology laboratory, a herbarium, children’s pond, rush and reed pond and audio video room.

Two large huts right after the entrance are dedicated to studying and group sessions including regular workshops and seminars.

== Diversity ==
Diyasaru park is home for more than 250 species of animals across all ranges including molluscs, arthropods and vertebrates. Many rare and migrant birds, butterflies, dragonflies, mammals, many types of fishes including endemics, amphibians, and reptiles are abundant. Numerically, there are about more than 80 species of wetland birds including 50 species of migratory birds, 15 species of fish including three endemics, 40 species of butterflies, 28 species of dragonflies, 28 species of reptiles, 7 species of mammals. A part of the park is reserved for five endangered fishing cats. Otters, purple faced leaf monkeys and estuarine crocodiles are also found in park sections.

== Animals at Diyasaru Park ==
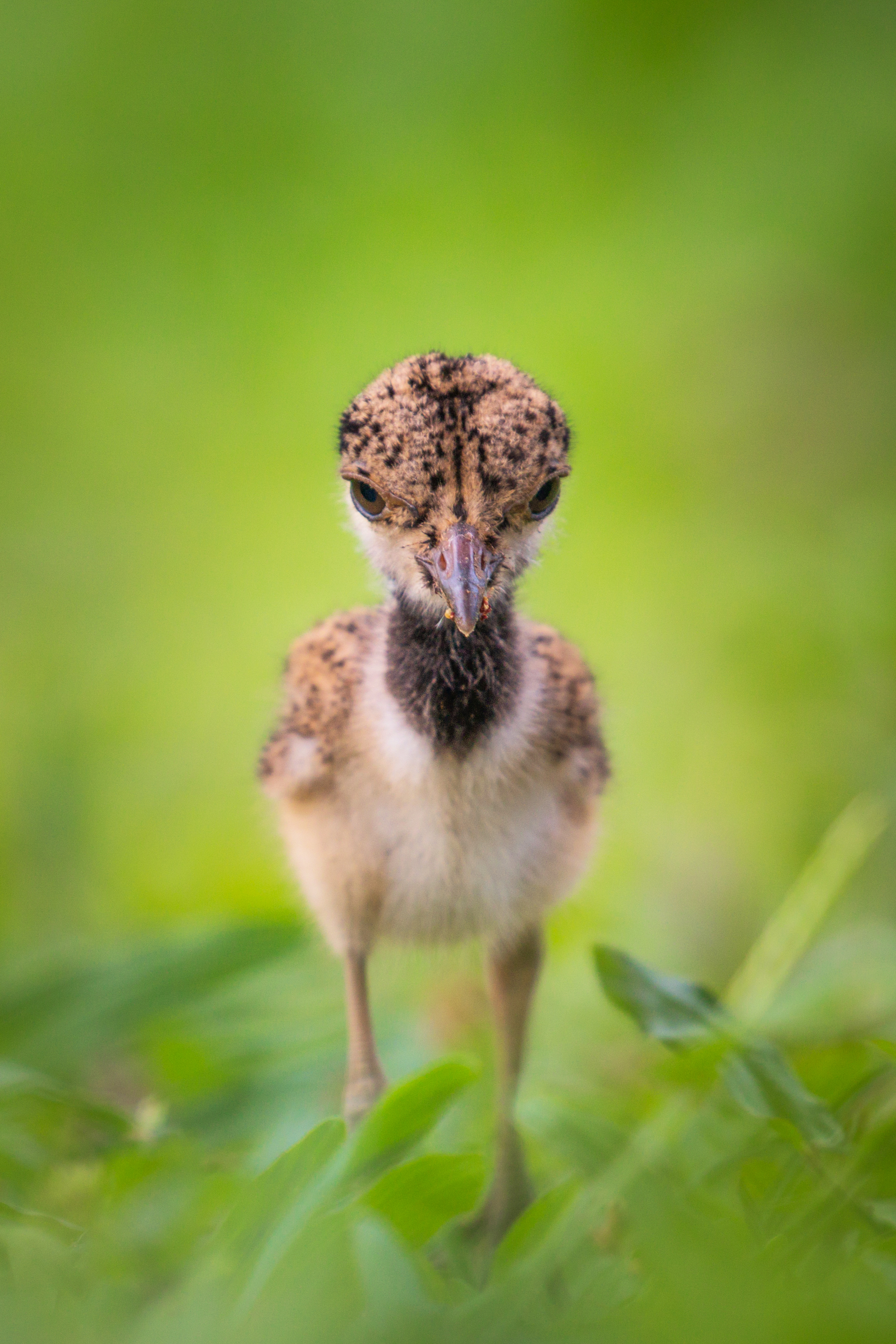
Juvenile red-wattled lapwing

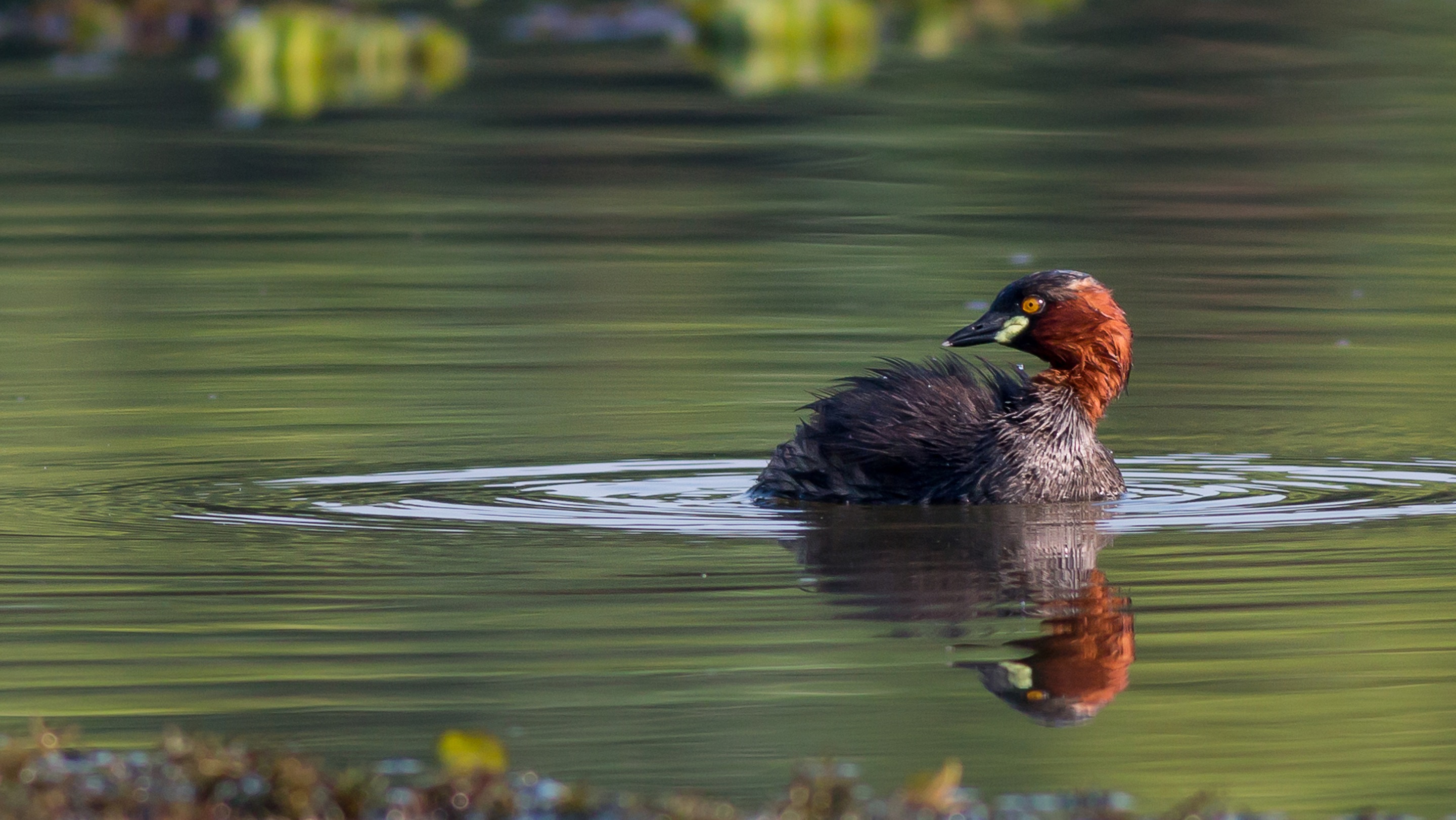
Little grebe

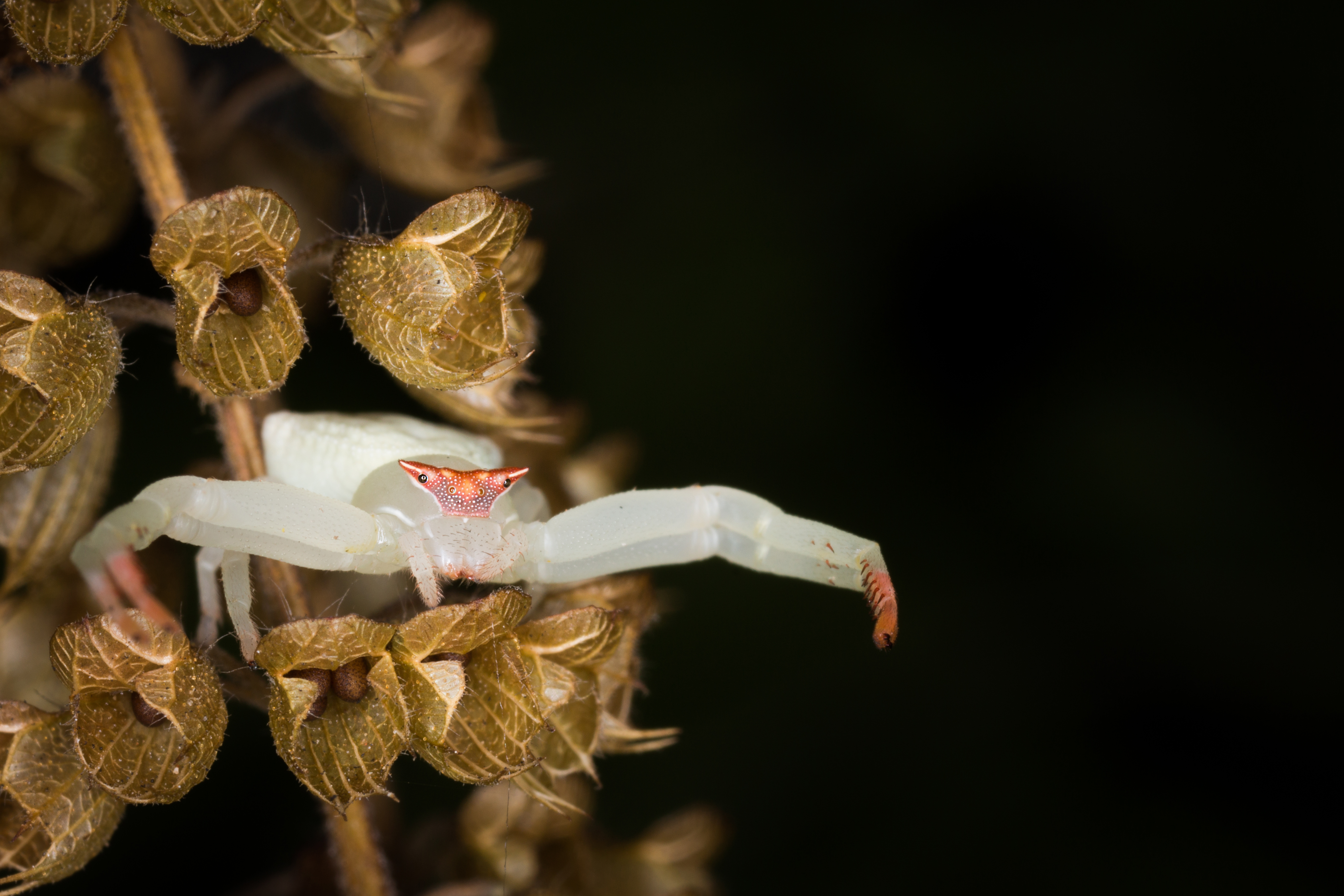
Flower crab spider

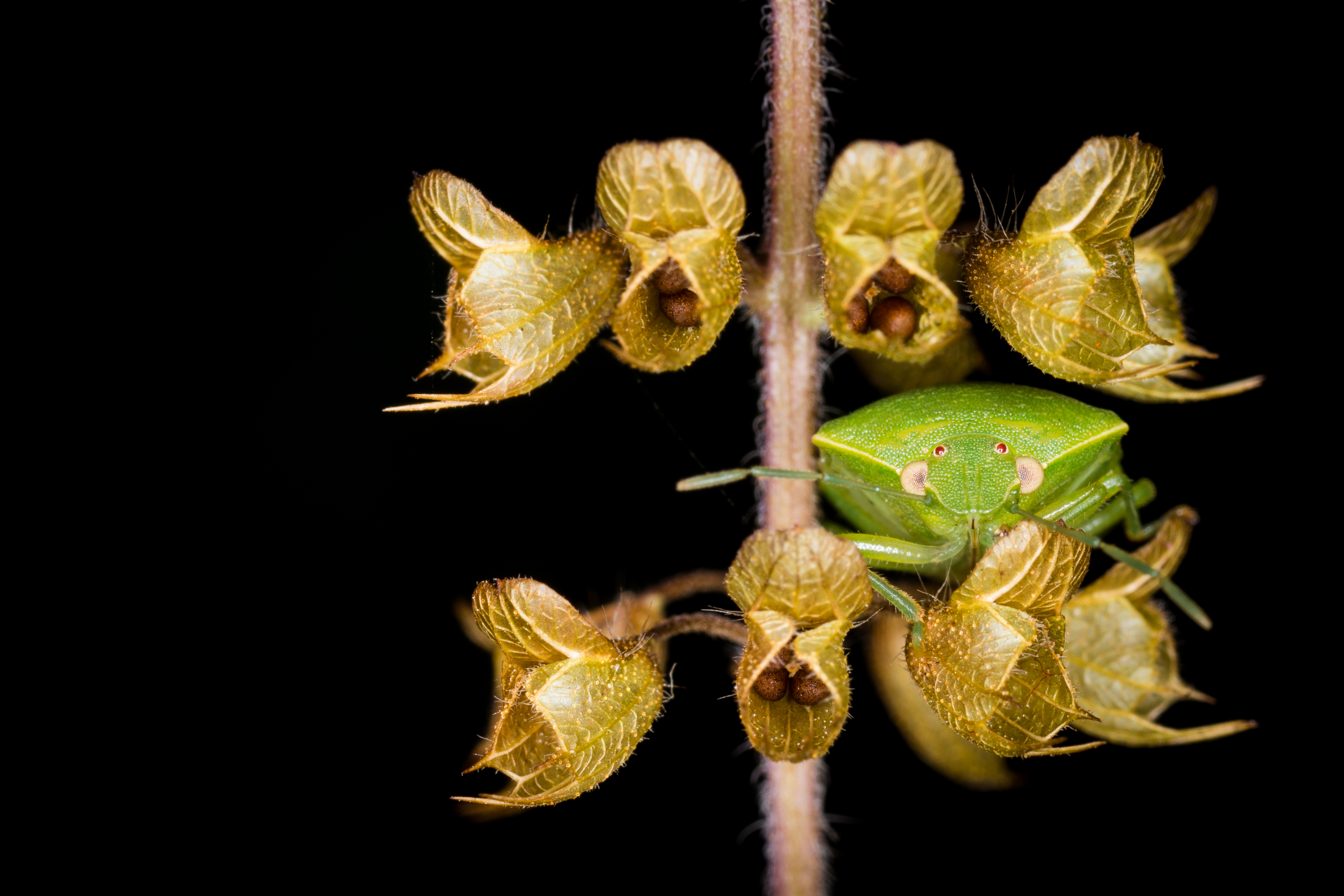
Green stink bug

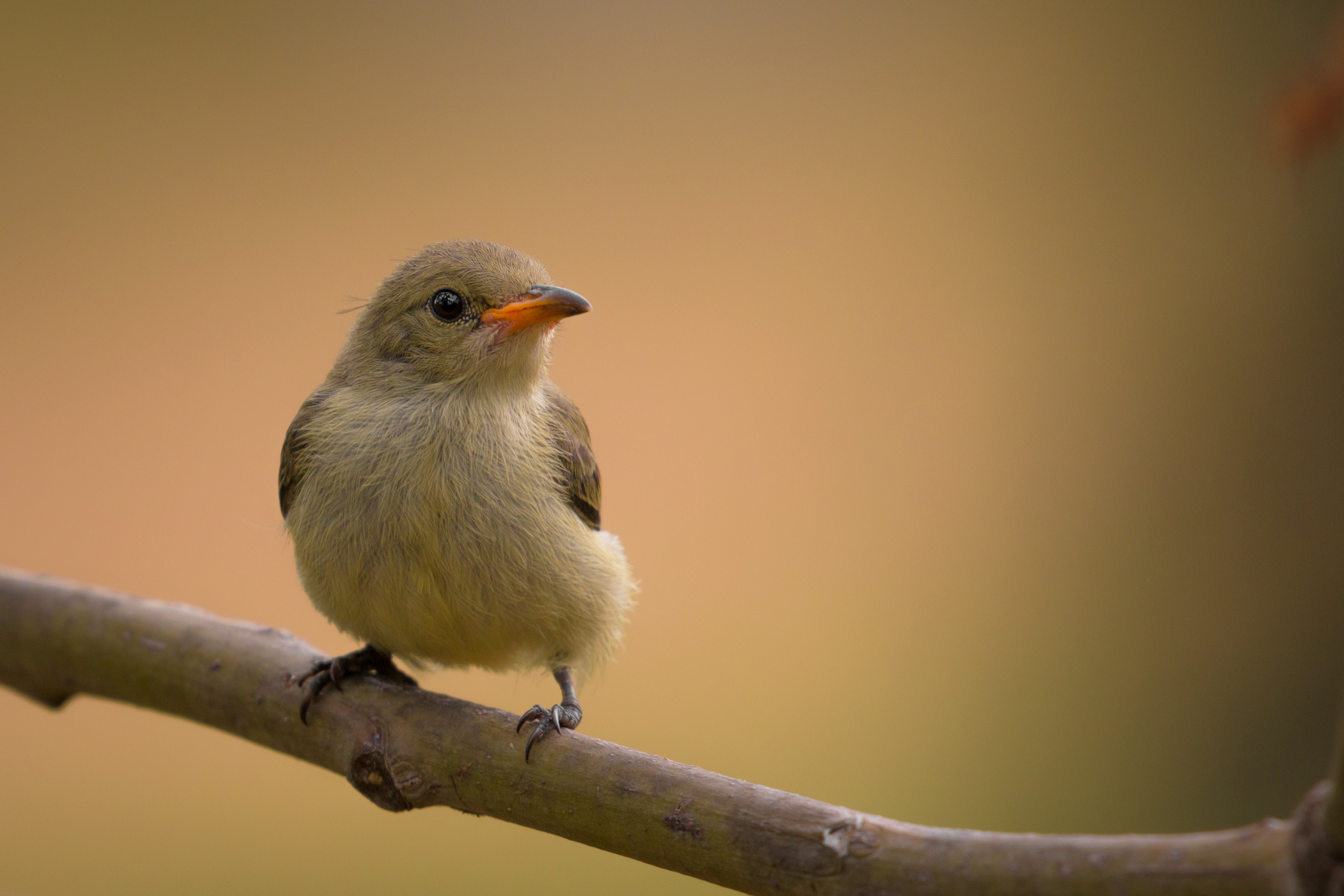
Pale-billed flowerpecker

== See also ==
- Muthurajawela wetlands
- Kirala Kelle wetlands
