= Hokandara =

Hokandara හෝකන්දර ஹொகந்தர
- Suburb
- Location in Colombo District
- Coordinates: 6°52′49″N 79°58′0″E
- Country: Sri Lanka
- Province: Western Province
- Time zone: UTC+5:30 (Sri Lanka Standard Time)
- Postal code: 10118

Hokandara is a suburb of Colombo district . It is located approximately 18 km (11 mi) from the centre of Colombo, adjacent to Thalawathugoda to the west, Pelawatte on the north-west, Malabe on the north, Aturugiriya on the east and Pannipitiya on the south.

It lies along the Hokandara–Kottawa Road and the Malabe–Aturugiriya Road.

Originally a rural farming area, Hokandara has developed into a predominantly middle- and upper-middle-class residential suburb since the 1990s.

Sub-areas such as Arangala, Everihena, Wellangiriya, and Horahena belong to Hokandara.

== History ==
The Rajavaliya mentions that King Rajasinghe I levied troops from Hokandara, prior to the Battle of Mulleriyawa in 1561. An Area which highly agriculture is done .

== Local facilities ==
- Supermarkets - Keells Super - Arangala, Dickland lands; Cargills Food City & LAUGFS supermarket - Hokandara Junction; Cargills Food City Express - Arangala and Samagi Mawatha, Co-op Food City - Hokandara South;
- Banks - (People's Bank)
- ATM's - Commercial Bank, Sampath Bank
- Petrol sheds - Arangala (Ceypetco) & Hokandara - Wanaguru Mawatha (Lanka IOC)
- Schools - (Vidura College - Colombo - Thalawathugoda Campus, Hokandara Vidyaraja Maha Vidyalaya), Hokandara Vidayaloka Vidyalaya.
- Road Connectivity - Athurugiriya Highway Entrance (OCH - Outer Colombo Highway)
- Bus Routes - 689 (Hokandara - Nugegoda), 993 (Malabe- Maharagama), 336 ( Malabe - Kottawa), 170 (Athurugiriya - Fort), 190 (Godagama/Meegoda - Fort), 17/255 (Panadura - Kandy), 336/1 (Kottawa - Malabe-via Horahena), 994 (Maharagama - Hokandara)
- Thalangama lake which has a beautiful environment which makes the home to various species of animals .

== Postal structure ==
The area is served by the Hokandara Post Office. It is divided into four postal subdivisions - north, east, south, and west.
