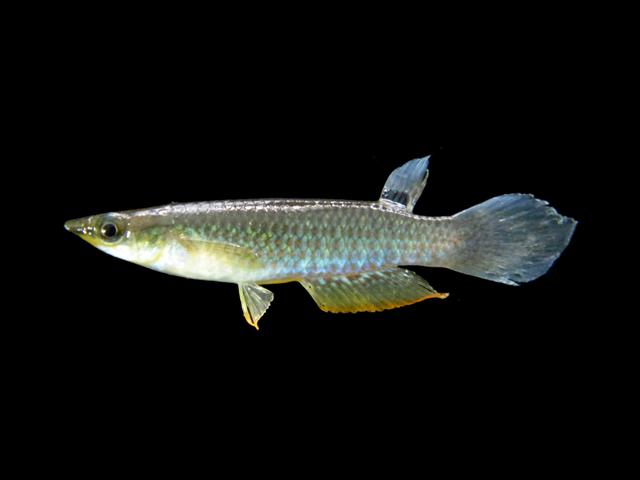

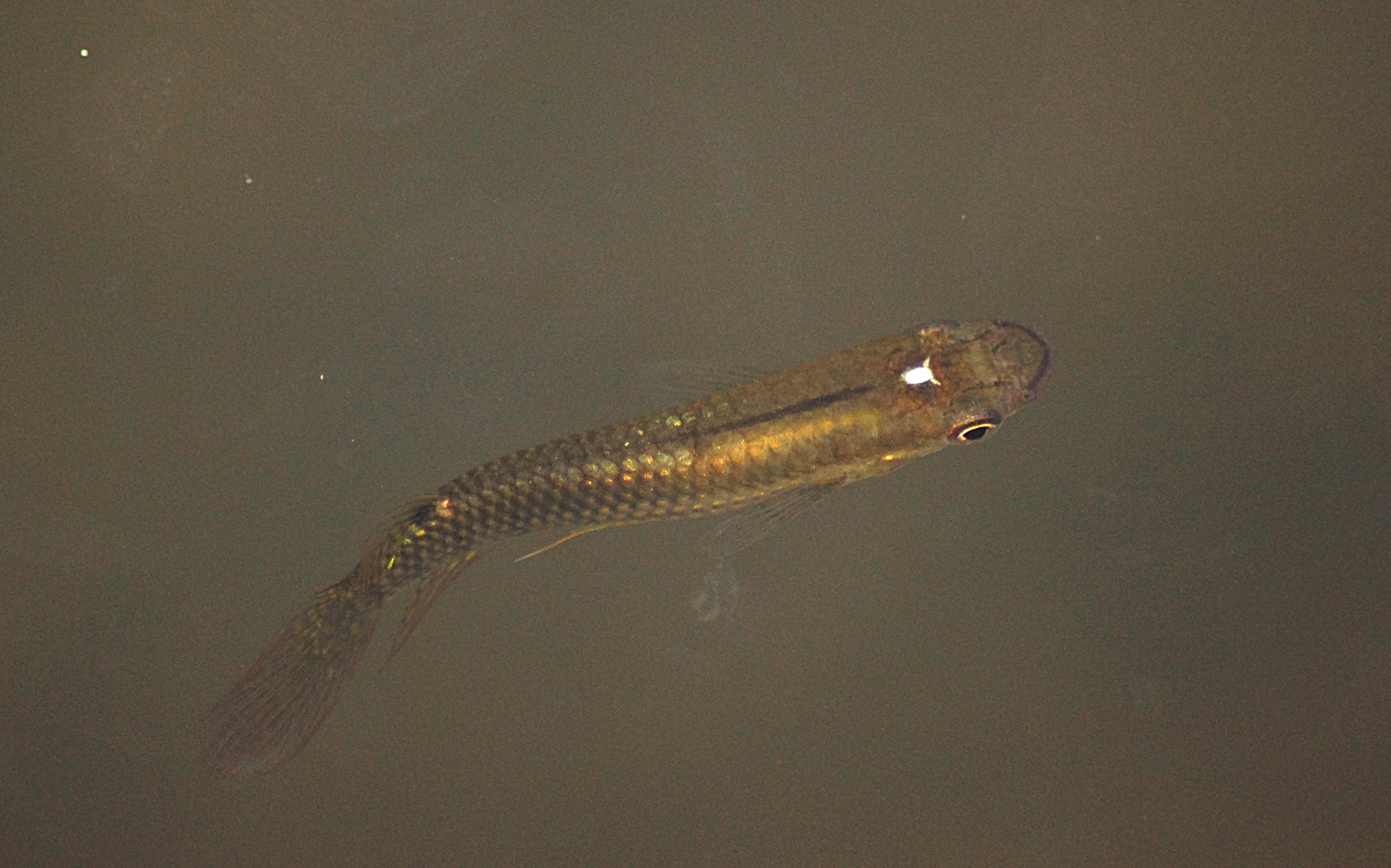

Conservation status
- Least Concern (IUCN 3.1)

Scientific classification
- Kingdom: Animalia
- Phylum: Chordata
- Class: Actinopterygii
- Order: Cyprinodontiformes
- Family: Aplocheilidae
- Genus: Aplocheilus
- Species: A. panchax

Binomial name
- Aplocheilus panchax F. Hamilton, 1822

= Blue panchax =

Species of fish

The blue panchax or whitespot (Aplocheilus panchax) is a common freshwater fish found in a large variety of habitats due to its high adaptability. This species is native to southern Asia from Pakistan, India, Malaysia to Indonesia. It has been discovered in two hot springs in Singapore. The species also commonly spotted in Johor Bahru rivers and estuaries. Identified by a white-coloured spot on its head, the species can reach up to 9 cm (3.5 in) in length; it tends to keep to the surface of the water, and controls the mosquito population by feeding on their larvae.
