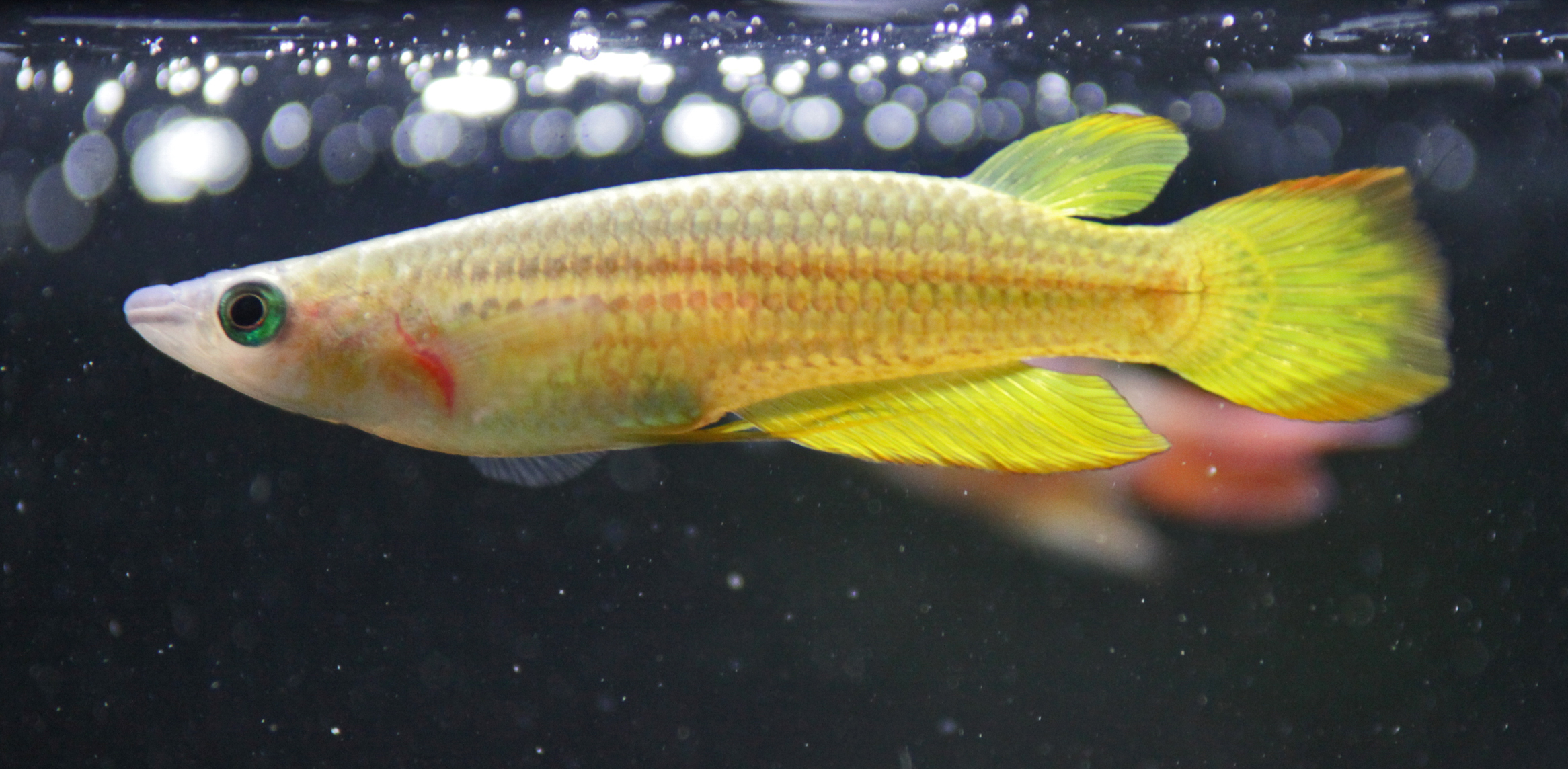
- Male of the golden variant

Conservation status
- Least Concern (IUCN 3.1)

Scientific classification
- Kingdom: Animalia
- Phylum: Chordata
- Class: Actinopterygii
- Order: Cyprinodontiformes
- Family: Aplocheilidae
- Genus: Aplocheilus
- Species: A. lineatus

Binomial name
- Aplocheilus lineatus (Valenciennes, 1846)

Synonyms
- Aplocheilus lineolatus (Freund, 1913); Panchax lineatum Valenciennes, 1846; Aplocheilus vittatus Jerdon, 1849; Aplocheilus affinis Jerdon, 1849; Haplochilus rubropictus Stansch, 1973; Aplocheilus rubropictus Stansch, 1973

= Striped panchax =

Species of fish

The striped panchax (Aplocheilus lineatus) is a species of killifish, of the genus Aplocheilus. An aquarium variant of this species with a more yellowish coloration is known as golden wonder killifish. The striped panchax inhabits fresh and brackish waters of India and Sri Lanka. It is found in streams, rivers, swamps, and paddy fields. In the wild it feeds on insects, crustaceans, and even small fishes. It grows to a length of 10 cm (4 in). Most male A. lineatus measure around 7 centimetres (3 in), but the fish can grow up to 10 centimetres (4 in) under excellent conditions, especially if brought to the end of its life expectancy, around six years. It possesses a parietal eye which permits it to see prey insects and predators above it on the surface. A. lineatus can jump very well.
