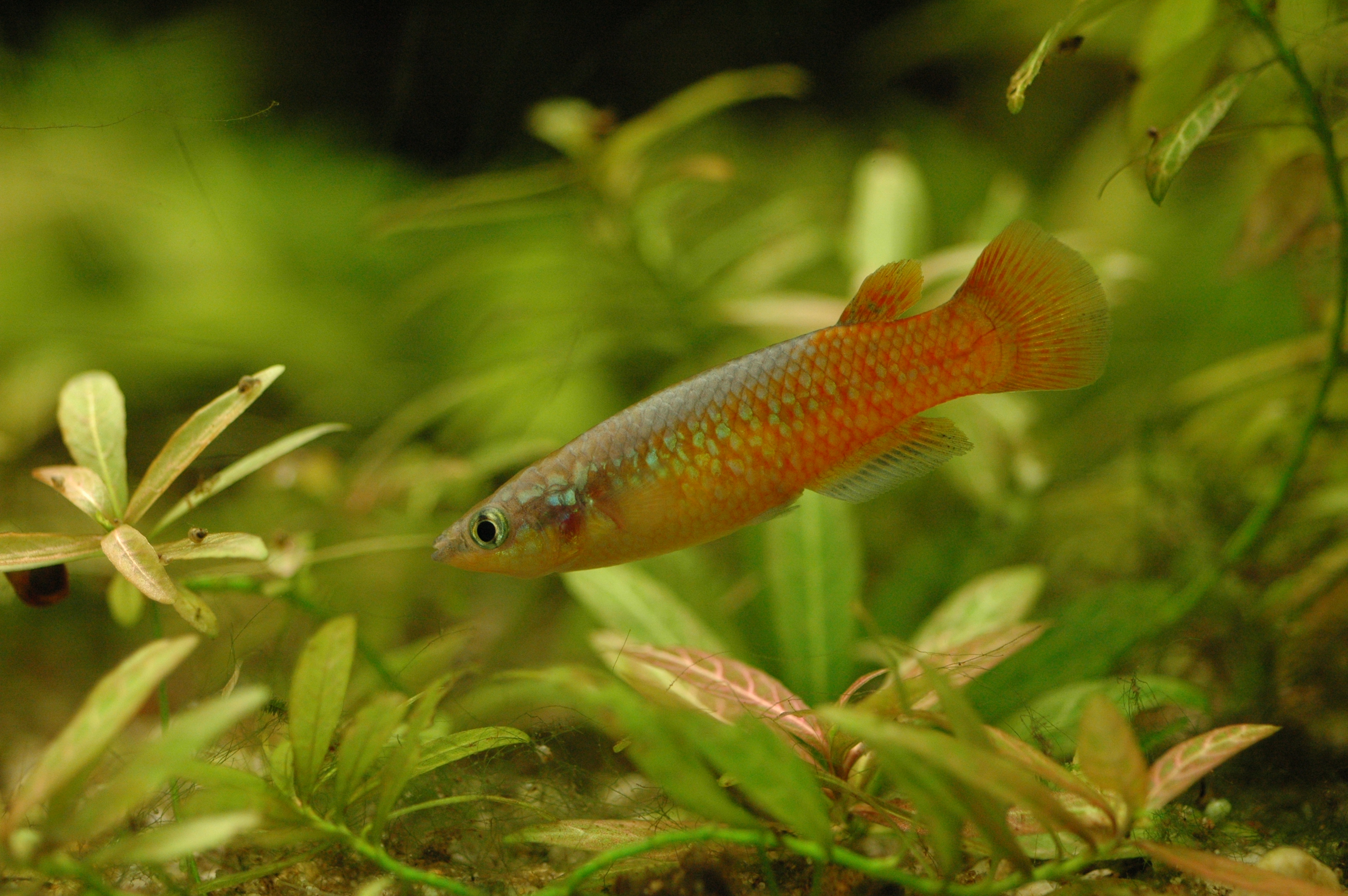
- Pachypanchax omalonotus

Scientific classification
- Kingdom: Animalia
- Phylum: Chordata
- Class: Actinopterygii
- Division: Teleostei
- Order: Cyprinodontiformes
- Family: Aplocheilidae
- Genus: Pachypanchax; G. S. Myers, 1933

Type species
- Haplochilus playfairii Günther, 1866

= Pachypanchax =

Genus of fishes

Pachypanchax is a genus of aplocheilid killifishes native to freshwater in Madagascar, with one species (P. playfairii) known from Seychelles.

== Species ==
The currently recognized species in this genus are:

- Pachypanchax arnoulti Loiselle, 2006
- Pachypanchax omalonotus (A. H. A. Duméril, 1861) (powder-blue panchax)
- Pachypanchax patriciae Loiselle, 2006
- Pachypanchax playfairii (Günther, 1866) (golden panchax)
- Pachypanchax sakaramyi (Holly, 1928)
- Pachypanchax sparksorum Loiselle, 2006
- Pachypanchax varatraza Loiselle, 2006

Several other species have been recognized, but not yet formally described. The new species designator does not necessarily carry over to the formal species name, and one of the new species listed below (Talio or Tsiribihina) is probably now known as P. patriciae.

- Pachypanchax sp. nov. 'Analava'
- Pachypanchax sp. nov. 'Sofia'
- Pachypanchax sp. nov. 'Talio'
- Pachypanchax sp. nov. 'Tsiribihina'
