= Aplocheilus blockii =

Conservation status
- Least Concern (IUCN 3.1)

Scientific classification
- Kingdom: Animalia
- Phylum: Chordata
- Class: Actinopterygii
- Order: Cyprinodontiformes
- Family: Aplocheilidae
- Genus: Aplocheilus
- Species: A. blockii

Binomial name
- Aplocheilus blockii Arnold, 1911

Species of fish

Aplocheilus blockii or the green panchax is a species of fish native to waters around India, Sri Lanka, and Pakistan.

== Description ==
Aplocheilus blockii measures 6 centimeters long. It frequently inhabits coastal habitats that either contain brackish water or fresh water. It feeds on larvae, insects, and fish fry.

== Name ==
This species was described by the German aquarist Johann Paul Arnold in 1911 with a type locality given as Cochim, India. The specific name honours a Captain Block who was responsible for importing this fish into Germany.
