= Thalawathugoda =

Thalawathugoda තලවතුගොඩ தலவத்துகொட
- Location within Sri Lanka
- Coordinates: 6°56′8″N 79°59′2″E
- Country: Sri Lanka
- Province: Western Province
- District: Colombo
- Time zone: UTC+5:30 (Sri Lanka Standard Time)
- Website: www.thalawathugoda.com

Thalawathugoda (Sinhala: තලවතුගොඩ, Tamil: தலவத்துகொட) is a vicinity of Maharagama governed by the Urban Council of Maharagama. It is located approximately 16 km (9.9 mi) from the centre of Colombo, adjacent to Battaramulla and Pelawatte on the Borella-Kottawa Road, bordering Sri Jayawardenapura-Kotte. The Diyawanna Oya (Parliament Lake) forms the "Sri Jayawardenapura-Kotte" boundary of Thalawathugoda.

== Hospitals ==
- Sri Jayawardenepura Hospital
- Hemas Hospital
- Sri Nara Ayrvedic medical center

== Schools ==
- Agramathya College
- i-GATE College
- Vidura College

== Banks ==
- Nations Trust Bank
- Sampath Bank
- Commercial Bank
- Bank Of Ceylon
- Hatton National Bank
- People's Bank
- National Savings Bank
- Pan Asia Bank
- Citizens Development Bank

== Urban Council ==
Thalawathugoda is served by the Maharagama Urban Council.

== Postal structure ==
Earlier, Thalawathugoda had a sub post office which was controlled by the Battaramulla main post office. The promoted Thalawathugoda Post Office was opened recently. However, a few areas fall under the Hokandara and Pannipitiya postal limits.

== See also ==
- Diyasaru Park
