= Hemas Hospitals =

- Hemas Holdings
- Logo

Geography
- Location: Wattala, Thalawathugoda, Gampaha, Thalawathugoda, Sri Lanka

Organisation
- Care system: Private Hospital
- Type: General
- Affiliated university: ACHSI

Services
- Standards: ACHSI
- Emergency department: +94 117 888 888
- Beds: 190

Helipads
- Helipad: no

History
- Founded: December 2008

Links
- Website: www.hemashospitals.com
- Lists: Hospitals in Sri Lanka

Hemas Hospitals is a Sri Lankan chain of hospitals based in Wattala. It expanded its developments in Thalawathugoda area in 2013 making it one of the largest ever known tertiary hospital chains in Sri Lanka. Hemas Hospitals also operates the largest medical diagnostic laboratory chain in Sri Lanka.

== Hemas Hospitals Wattala, and Thalawathugoda ==
This is the first-ever known tertiary care private hospital established in the Gampaha District. Within the past few years, the hospital has come along with a breach of development that features 24/7 emergency access for patients and an online consultation system. There are approximately 130 beds at the hospital including intensive care units and an emergency treatment unit. The facilities of Hemas Hospital Wattala also includes laboratory, MRI Scans, CT Scans, Ultrasound Scans, Digital X-Ray, Mammography, Dexa Scans, Endoscopy, Laparoscopic surgery, cystoscopy, Fertility center, Cosmetic center, health checks, general surgery, orthopedic surgery, gastrointestinal surgery, kidney transplant, weight loss surgery, gynecology, obstetrics, neurosurgery, pediatrics, and internal medicine.

In 2025 Hemas announced they were expanding their Thalawathugoda hospital, doubling its capacity to 150 beds.
