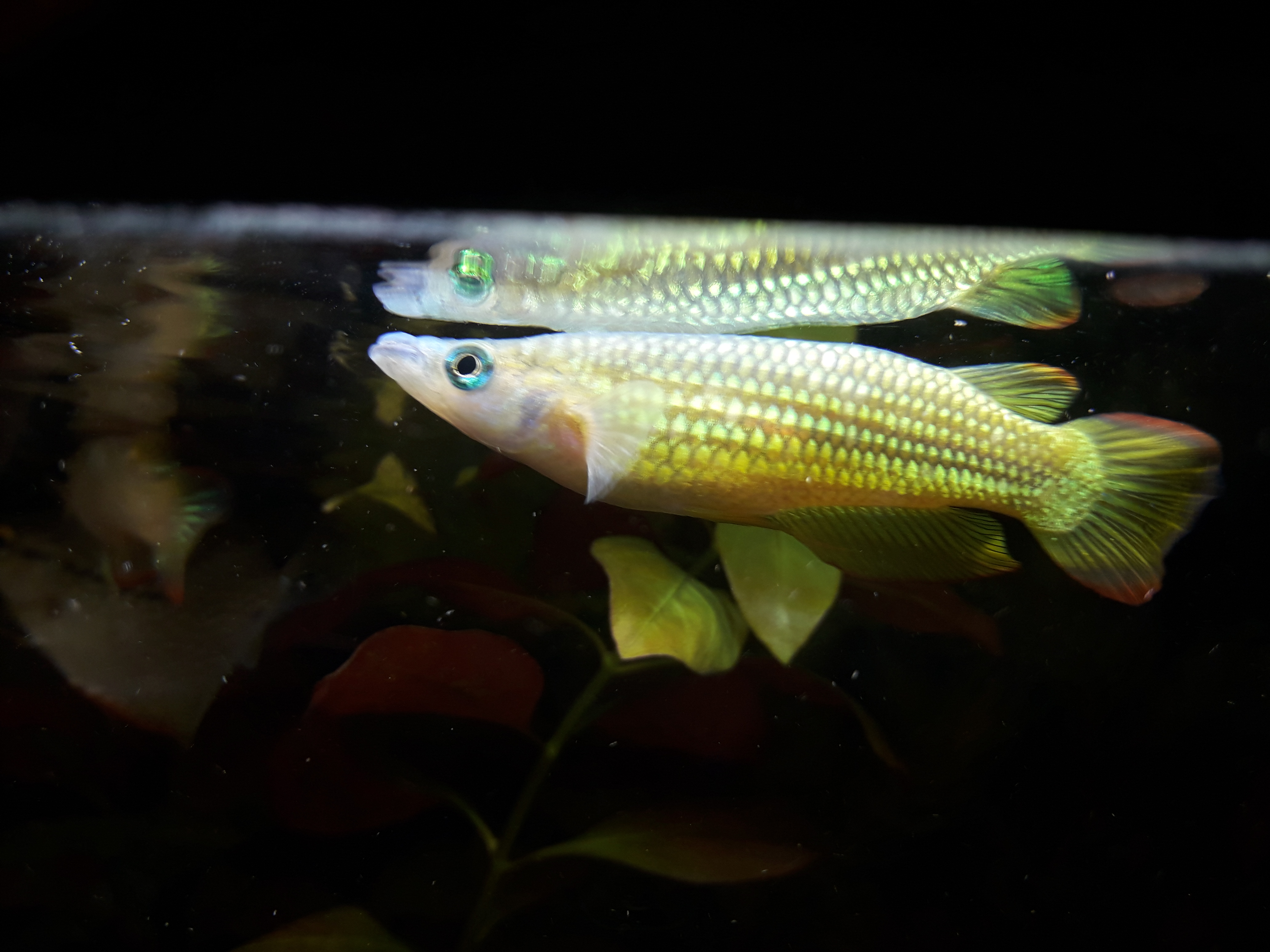
- Aplocheilus lineatus

Scientific classification
- Kingdom: Animalia
- Phylum: Chordata
- Class: Actinopterygii
- Division: Teleostei
- Order: Cyprinodontiformes
- Suborder: Aplocheiloidei
- Family: Aplocheilidae; Bleeker, 1859

= Aplocheilidae =

Family of fishes

Aplocheilidae, the Asian killifishes or Asian rivulines, is a family of fish in the order found in Asia. Some authorities use this family-group name, which is well-established, for a single lumped aplocheiloid family as it gives the nomenclature stability over time and avoids the impact of a new name at family rank for a popular aquarium fish group. Following this proposal, Aplocheilidae would include three subfamilies: Aplocheilinae for the species from Asia, Madagascar and the Seychelles; Cynolebiinae (formerly called Rivulidae) for the species from the Americas; and Nothobranchiinae for the species from the African mainland. However, the 5th edition of Fishes of the World still classifies these as separate families, and at least one 2008 study suggests that even the narrow Aplocheilidae may not be monophyletic, with Aplocheilus itself possibly being basal to all other Cyprinodontiforms and thus only distantly related to the younger Pachypanchax.

== Genesis ==
There are two genera which are currently placed in the family Aplocheilidae:

- Aplocheilus McClelland, 1838
- Pachypanchax Myers, 1933
