= Wattegedara (Maharagama) Grama Niladhari Division =

Wattegedara
- Grama Niladhari Division
- Interactive map of Wattegedara
- Coordinates: 6.847094°N 79.918106°E
- Country: Sri Lanka
- Province: Western Province
- District: Colombo District
- Divisional Secretariat: Maharagama Divisional Secretariat
- Electoral District: Colombo Electoral District
- Polling Division: Maharagama Polling Division

Area
  - Total: 1.42 km^{2} (0.55 sq mi)
- Elevation: 14 m (46 ft)

Population (2012)
  - Total: 7,734
  - Density: 5,446/km^{2} (14,110/sq mi)
- ISO 3166 code: LK-1121185

Wattegedara

Wattegedara Grama Niladhari Division is a Grama Niladhari Division of the Maharagama Divisional Secretariat of Colombo District of Western Province, Sri Lanka. It has Grama Niladhari Division Code 532C.

Maharagama are located within, nearby or associated with Wattegedara.

Wattegedara is a surrounded by the Godigamuwa North, Maharagama West, Egodawatta, Boralesgamuwa East B, Godigamuwa South, Maharagama Town, Navinna and Pathiragoda Grama Niladhari Divisions.

== Demographics ==
=== Ethnicity ===
The Wattegedara Grama Niladhari Division has a Sinhalese majority (94.5%). In comparison, the Maharagama Divisional Secretariat (which contains the Wattegedara Grama Niladhari Division) has a Sinhalese majority (95.7%)

Ethnicity in Wattegedara
1. Sinhalese (94.5%)
2. Sri Lankan Tamil (2.40%)
3. Other (1.90%)
4. Malay (1.30%)

=== Religion ===
The Wattegedara Grama Niladhari Division has a Buddhist majority (90.2%). In comparison, the Maharagama Divisional Secretariat (which contains the Wattegedara Grama Niladhari Division) has a Buddhist majority (92.0%)

Religion in Wattegedara
1. Buddhist (90.2%)
2. Roman Catholic (4.10%)
3. Hindu (2.20%)
4. Other Christian (1.80%)
5. Muslim (1.60%)
6. Other (0.10%)
