= Maharagama Urban Council =

Maharagama Urban Council: මහරගම නගර සභාව (Sinhala); மகாரகம நகர சபை (Tamil)
- Seal of the Maharagama Urban Council

Type
- Type: Local Authority
- Term limits: 4 years

History
- Founded: 1963; 62 years ago

Leadership
- Chairman: SM Smarakon, (NPP) since 6 May 2025
- Navurunnage Ranjani, (NPP) since 6 May 2025

Structure
- Seats: 43
- Political groups: NPP (24); Independents (7); SJB (6); SLPP (3); SB (2); UNP (1)

Elections
- Last election: 6 May 2025
- Next election: TBD

Motto
- බහුජන හිතාය බහුජන සුඛාය

Meeting place
- Maharagama Urban Council building, Highlevel Road, Maharagama, Sri Lanka

Website
- Maharagama Urban Council

Maharagama Urban Council (Sinhala: මහරගම නගර සභාව, Tamil: மகாரகம நகர சபை) is the local authority for Maharagama and surrounding suburbs in Sri Lanka. The Council is responsible for providing a variety of local public services including public health and sanitation, road maintenance, garbage disposal, libraries, public parks and recreational facilities. The stated goals of the council include providing infrastructure needs, and enhancing regional economic development in a sustainable manner.

== History ==
The Maharagama local body was established in 1963 with an area of only 5 km^{2} (1.9 sq mi). In 1988 this was expanded to 21 km^{2} (8.1 sq mi) and the body was upgraded to Pradeshiya Sabha status.

On 10 January 2002, the Maharagama Urban Council was gazetted by Alick Aluwihare, as Minister of Local Government. Accordingly, the Urban Council was granted jurisdiction over 41 Grama Niladhari divisions. The tenure of the first council began on 15 April 2002.

== Geography ==
Maharagama Urban Council is situated in Colombo District, about 16 km (9.9 mi) south east of Colombo. It is 21 km^{2} (8.1 sq mi) in extent, and bordered by the Sri Jayawardenapura Kotte Municipal Council to the north and north west, Homagama to the east, Kesbewa Urban Council to the south and Dehiwala-Mount Lavinia Municipal Council to the west.

=== Wards ===
For electoral and administrative purposes, the Council is divided into 25 wards.

1. Mirihana South
2. Mirihana North
3. Madiwela
4. Pragathipura
5. Udahamulla
6. Thalapathpitiya
7. Pamunuwa
8. Thalawathugoda
9. Kalalgoda
10. Depanama
11. Kottawa West
12. Kottawa East
13. Rukmale
14. Makumbura
15. Kottawa South
16. Kottawa Town
17. Pannipitiya
18. Maharagama South
19. Maharagama North
20. Pathiragoda
21. Navinna
22. Gangodavila
23. Wattegedara
24. Godigamuwa North
25. Godigamuwa South

=== Grama Niladhari Divisions ===
The council comprises 41 Grama Niladhari Divisions

1. Kalalgoda
2. Thalawathugoda West
3. Thalawathugoda East
4. Kottawa South
5. Kottawa East
6. Kottawa City
7. Kottawa North
8. Kottawa West
9. Liyanagoda
10. Rukmale West
11. Rukmale East (497A)
12. Rukmale East (497B)
13. Malapalla East
14. Makumbura North
15. Malapalla West
16. Makumbura South
17. Mirihana North
18. Mirihana South
19. Madiwela
20. Pragathipura
21. Thalapathpitiya
22. Udahamulla East
23. Udahamulla West
24. Gangodawila South
25. Wijerama
26. Jambugasmulla
27. Nawinna
28. Pathiragoda
29. Maharagama East
30. Maharagama West
31. Pamunuwa
32. Dambahena
33. Polwaththa
34. Depanama
35. Maharagama City
36. Pannipitiya North
37. Pannipitiya South
38. Godigamuwa North
39. Godigamuwa South (532A)
40. Godigamuwa South (532B)
41. Waththegedara

== Demographics ==
In 2014, the population was 202,557 and the council collected taxes from 77,740 properties.

== Services ==
=== Health and Sanitation ===
The council provides the following Health and Sanitation related services:

- Garbage collection and waste Management
- Issuing/renewal of environmental licenses
- Provision of Gully Bowsers for cleaning wastewater
- Provision of Ayurvedic and Dental care

=== Revenue ===
The council provides the following certificates and licenses:

- Non-Acquisition Certificate
- Trade License
- Club License
- Bicycle License
- Entertainment Show License

Other revenue generation activities:

- Collection of council rates
- Tax for industry / businesses
- Leasing out advertising hoardings
- Reservation of community halls and playgrounds
- Allocations of crematorium time slots and cemetery burial lots

The council maintains 9 crematoriums.

=== Building and Industries ===
The council is in charge of regulating the built environment under its jurisdiction:

- Approvals for the subdivision of land
- Approval of building plans and boundary/retaining wall designs
- Issuance of Certificates of Conformity
- Receiving complaints regarding approvals and dangerous trees

=== Libraries ===
The council maintains 4 public libraries, and provides the following services:

- Running 4 libraries:
1. Main Library, Maharagama
2. Rukmale Library
3. Madiwela Library
4. Kottawa Kulasevana Library
- Granting of Library membership
- Mobile Library Services
- Renewal of membership
- Providing space for scholarship and studies.

=== Other Services ===
The council also provides the following services:

- Maintenance of community halls and conducting community training programs
- Running 4 preschools:
1. Maharagama
2. Rukmalgama
3. Mirihana
4. Delgahawatta

== See also ==
- Maharagama Divisional Secretariat
- Maharagama Polling Division
