= Malapalla East Grama Niladhari Division =

Malapalla East
- Grama Niladhari Division
- Interactive map of Malapalla East
- Coordinates: 6.848235°N 79.986574°E
- Country: Sri Lanka
- Province: Western Province
- District: Colombo District
- Divisional Secretariat: Maharagama Divisional Secretariat
- Electoral District: Colombo Electoral District
- Polling Division: Maharagama Polling Division

Area
  - Total: 1.03 km^{2} (0.40 sq mi)
- Elevation: 35 m (115 ft)

Population (2012)
  - Total: 3,648
  - Density: 3,542/km^{2} (9,170/sq mi)
- ISO 3166 code: LK-1121140

Malapalla East

Malapalla East Grama Niladhari Division is a Grama Niladhari Division of the Maharagama Divisional Secretariat of Colombo District of Western Province, Sri Lanka. It has Grama Niladhari Division Code 498.

St. Michael's College, Homagama are located within, nearby or associated with Malapalla East.

Malapalla East is a surrounded by the Homagama South, Malapalla West, Makumbura North, Rukmale West and Rukmale East B Grama Niladhari Divisions.

== Demographics ==
=== Ethnicity ===
The Malapalla East Grama Niladhari Division has a Sinhalese majority (98.2%). In comparison, the Maharagama Divisional Secretariat (which contains the Malapalla East Grama Niladhari Division) has a Sinhalese majority (95.7%)

Ethnicity in Malapalla East
1. Sinhalese (98.2%)
2. Other (1.80%)

=== Religion ===
The Malapalla East Grama Niladhari Division has a Buddhist majority (97.1%). In comparison, the Maharagama Divisional Secretariat (which contains the Malapalla East Grama Niladhari Division) has a Buddhist majority (92.0%)

Religion in Malapalla East
1. Buddhist (97.1%)
2. Other (1.90%)
3. Roman Catholic (1.00%)
