= Dambahena Grama Niladhari Division =

Dambahena
- Grama Niladhari Division
- Interactive map of Dambahena
- Coordinates: 6.850088°N 79.934433°E
- Country: Sri Lanka
- Province: Western Province
- District: Colombo District
- Divisional Secretariat: Maharagama Divisional Secretariat
- Electoral District: Colombo Electoral District
- Polling Division: Maharagama Polling Division

Area
  - Total: 1.11 km^{2} (0.43 sq mi)
- Elevation: 19 m (62 ft)

Population (2012)
  - Total: 5,233
  - Density: 4,714/km^{2} (12,210/sq mi)
- ISO 3166 code: LK-1121115

Dambahena

Dambahena Grama Niladhari Division is a Grama Niladhari Division of the Maharagama Divisional Secretariat of Colombo District of Western Province, Sri Lanka. It has Grama Niladhari Division Code 528A.

President's College, Maharagama are located within, nearby or associated with Dambahena.

Dambahena is a surrounded by the Maharagama West, Pannipitiya North, Maharagama Town, Pamunuwa and Polwatta Grama Niladhari Divisions.

== Demographics ==
=== Ethnicity ===
The Dambahena Grama Niladhari Division has a Sinhalese majority (92.7%). In comparison, the Maharagama Divisional Secretariat (which contains the Dambahena Grama Niladhari Division) has a Sinhalese majority (95.7%)

Ethnicity in Dambahena
1. Sinhalese (92.7%)
2. Moor (4.50%)
3. Sri Lankan Tamil (1.40%)
4. Other (1.40%)

=== Religion ===
The Dambahena Grama Niladhari Division has a Buddhist majority (89.0%). In comparison, the Maharagama Divisional Secretariat (which contains the Dambahena Grama Niladhari Division) has a Buddhist majority (92.0%)

Religion in Dambahena
1. Buddhist (89.0%)
2. Muslim (5.00%)
3. Roman Catholic (3.40%)
4. Other Christian (1.50%)
5. Hindu (1.10%)
6. Other (0.00%)

== Gallery ==
Dambahena Devalaya is the oldest religious site located in the center of the village
