= Rukmale =

Rukmale: රුක්මලේ (Sinhala); ருக்மலே (Tamil)
- Suburb
- Location of Rukmale within Colombo District
- Coordinates: 6.8570375°N 79.98558916°E
- Country: Sri Lanka
- Province: Western Province
- District: Colombo District
- Time zone: UTC+5:30 (Sri Lanka Standard Time Zone)
- Postal Code: 10230

Rukmale is a village situated in the Maharagama Electorate, Colombo District, in the Western Province, Sri Lanka. It is administered by the Maharagama Urban Council.

Surrounding towns include Kottawa, Malapalla, Horahena, Hokandara, Aturugiriya, Walgama, Pinketha, Homagama, Galawila and Makumbura.

There are number of bus routes passing the area starting from Colombo, Maharagama, Kottawa, Aturuguruya, Malabe and Homagama.

- Colombo-Aturugiriya, route no.138/4
- Colombo-Rukmalgama, route no. 138/3
- Maharagama-Aturugiriya, route no.123
- Kottawa-Malabe route no.336
- Homagama-Maharagama route no.128.

The proposed development project of Southern Expressway runs through Rukmale village.

Approximate area is 1 square mile (640 acres).

B. D. Rampala (Bamunusinghearachchige Don Rampala), mechanical engineer and General Manager of Sri Lanka Railways, was born in Rukmale.
