= Udahamulla East Grama Niladhari Division =

Udahamulla East
- Grama Niladhari Division
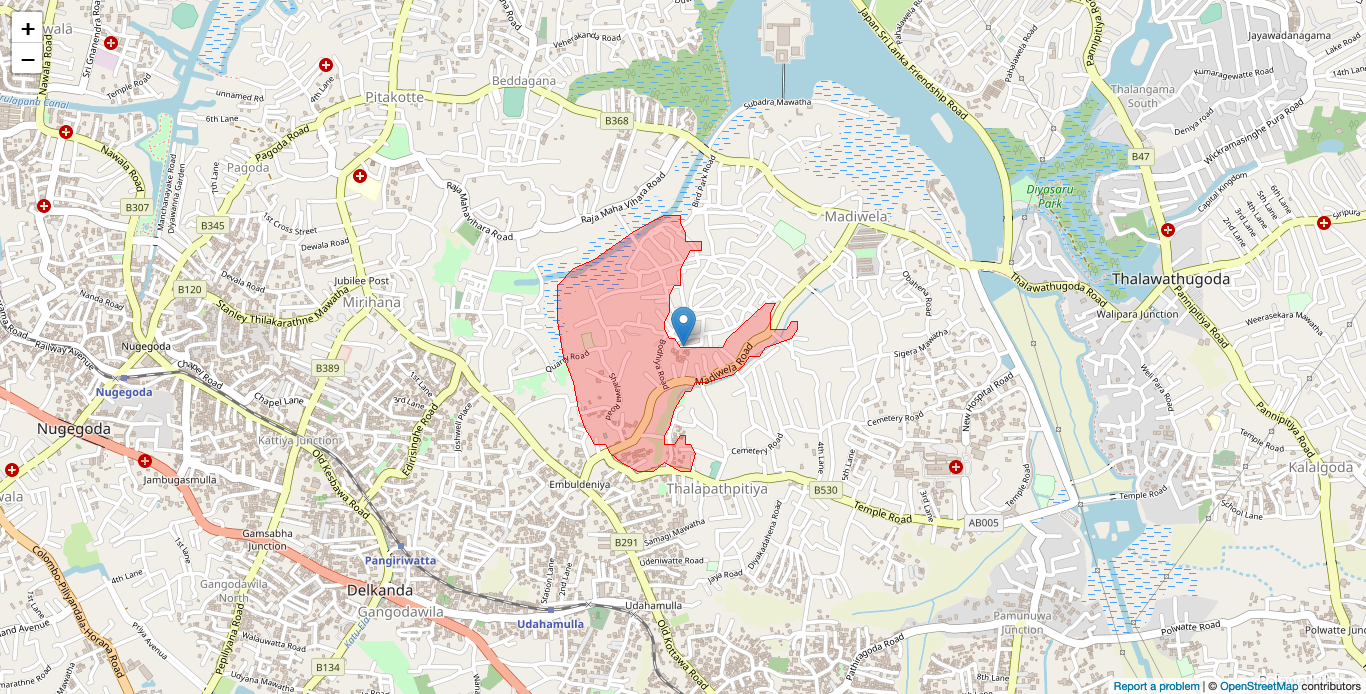
- Udahamulla East Grama Niladhari Division
- Coordinates: 6.873406°N 79.914418°E
- Country: Sri Lanka
- Province: Western Province
- District: Colombo District
- Divisional Secretariat: Maharagama Divisional Secretariat
- Electoral District: Colombo Electoral District
- Polling Division: Maharagama Polling Division

Area
  - Total: 0.72 km^{2} (0.28 sq mi)
- Elevation: 27 m (89 ft)

Population (2012)
  - Total: 6,309
  - Density: 8,763/km^{2} (22,700/sq mi)
- ISO 3166 code: LK-1121090

Udahamulla East Grama Niladhari Division is a Grama Niladhari Division of the Maharagama Divisional Secretariat of Colombo District of Western Province, Sri Lanka . It has Grama Niladhari Division Code 525A.

Udahamulla East is a surrounded by the Mirihana South, Madiwela, Mirihana North, Pragathipura, Udahamulla West and Thalapathpitiya Grama Niladhari Divisions.

== Demographics ==
=== Ethnicity ===
The Udahamulla East Grama Niladhari Division has a Sinhalese majority (95.4%) . In comparison, the Maharagama Divisional Secretariat (which contains the Udahamulla East Grama Niladhari Division) has a Sinhalese majority (95.7%)

Ethnicity in Udahamulla East
1. Sinhalese (95.4%)
2. Sri Lankan Tamil (1.80%)
3. Burgher (1.40%)
4. Other (1.40%)

=== Religion ===
The Udahamulla East Grama Niladhari Division has a Buddhist majority (90.7%) . In comparison, the Maharagama Divisional Secretariat (which contains the Udahamulla East Grama Niladhari Division) has a Buddhist majority (92.0%)

Religion in Udahamulla East
1. Buddhist (90.7%)
2. Roman Catholic (4.50%)
3. Other Christian (2.40%)
4. Hindu (1.40%)
5. Other (1.00%)
