= Maharagama West Grama Niladhari Division =

Maharagama West
- Grama Niladhari Division
- Interactive map of Maharagama West
- Coordinates: 6.851524°N 79.925421°E
- Country: Sri Lanka
- Province: Western Province
- District: Colombo District
- Divisional Secretariat: Maharagama Divisional Secretariat
- Electoral District: Colombo Electoral District
- Polling Division: Maharagama Polling Division

Area
  - Total: 0.44 km^{2} (0.17 sq mi)
- Elevation: 19 m (62 ft)

Population (2012)
  - Total: 2,464
  - Density: 5,600/km^{2} (15,000/sq mi)
- ISO 3166 code: LK-1121110

Maharagama West

Maharagama West Grama Niladhari Division is a Grama Niladhari Division of the Maharagama Divisional Secretariat of Colombo District of Western Province, Sri Lanka. It has Grama Niladhari Division Code 527C.

Maharagama and President's College, Maharagama are located within, nearby, or associated with Maharagama West.

Maharagama West is a surrounded by the Pamunuwa, Dambahena, Maharagama Town, Wattegedara, Pathiragoda and Maharagama East Grama Niladhari Divisions.

== Demographics ==
=== Ethnicity ===
The Maharagama West Grama Niladhari Division has a Sinhalese majority (89.1%). In comparison, the Maharagama Divisional Secretariat (which contains the Maharagama West Grama Niladhari Division) has a Sinhalese majority (95.7%)

Ethnicity in Maharagama West
1. Sinhalese (89.1%)
2. Moor (7.10%)
3. Other (2.40%)
4. Sri Lankan Tamil (1.40%)

=== Religion ===
The Maharagama West Grama Niladhari Division has a Buddhist majority (87.2%). In comparison, the Maharagama Divisional Secretariat (which contains the Maharagama West Grama Niladhari Division) has a Buddhist majority (92.0%)

Religion in Maharagama West
1. Buddhist (87.2%)
2. Muslim (7.30%)
3. Roman Catholic (2.60%)
4. Hindu (2.00%)
5. Other (0.90%)
