= Makumbura North Grama Niladhari Division =

Makumbura North
- Grama Niladhari Division
- Interactive map of Makumbura North
- Coordinates: 6.842611°N 79.981437°E
- Country: Sri Lanka
- Province: Western Province
- District: Colombo District
- Divisional Secretariat: Maharagama Divisional Secretariat
- Electoral District: Colombo Electoral District
- Polling Division: Maharagama Polling Division

Area
  - Total: 1.13 km^{2} (0.44 sq mi)
- Elevation: 15 m (49 ft)

Population (2012)
  - Total: 3,458
  - Density: 3,060/km^{2} (7,900/sq mi)
- ISO 3166 code: LK-1121145

Makumbura North

Makumbura North Grama Niladhari Division is a Grama Niladhari Division of the Maharagama Divisional Secretariat of Colombo District of Western Province, Sri Lanka. It has Grama Niladhari Division Code 498A.

Makumbura North is a surrounded by the Homagama South, Galavilawatta North, Malapalla West, Kottawa Town, Makumbura South and Malapalla East Grama Niladhari Divisions.

== Demographics ==
=== Ethnicity ===
The Makumbura North Grama Niladhari Division has a Sinhalese majority (95.1%). In comparison, the Maharagama Divisional Secretariat (which contains the Makumbura North Grama Niladhari Division) has a Sinhalese majority (95.7%)

Ethnicity in Makumbura North
1. Sinhalese (95.1%)
2. Other (2.80%)
3. Sri Lankan Tamil (1.30%)
4. Other (0.70%)

=== Religion ===
The Makumbura North Grama Niladhari Division has a Buddhist majority (93.0%). In comparison, the Maharagama Divisional Secretariat (which contains the Makumbura North Grama Niladhari Division) has a Buddhist majority (92.0%)

Religion in Makumbura North
1. Buddhist (93.0%)
2. Others (2.80%)
3. Roman Catholic (1.50%)
4. Hindu (1.10%)
5. Other Christian (1.10%)
6. Other (0.50%)
