= Thalawathugoda West Grama Niladhari Division =

Thalawathugoda West
- Grama Niladhari Division
- Interactive map of Thalawathugoda West
- Coordinates: 6.870446°N 79.934828°E
- Country: Sri Lanka
- Province: Western Province
- District: Colombo District
- Divisional Secretariat: Maharagama Divisional Secretariat
- Electoral District: Colombo Electoral District
- Polling Division: Maharagama Polling Division

Area
  - Total: 1.54 km^{2} (0.59 sq mi)
- Elevation: 14 m (46 ft)

Population (2012)
  - Total: 5,492
  - Density: 3,566/km^{2} (9,240/sq mi)
- ISO 3166 code: LK-1121020

Thalawathugoda West

Thalawathugoda West Grama Niladhari Division is a Grama Niladhari Division of the Maharagama Divisional Secretariat of Colombo District of Western Province, Sri Lanka. It has Grama Niladhari Division Code 493A.

Thalawathugoda are located within, nearby or associated with Thalawathugoda West.

Thalawathugoda West is a surrounded by the Pahalawela, Kalalgoda, Madiwela, Pamunuwa, Polwatta, Thalapathpitiya and Thalawathugoda East Grama Niladhari Divisions.

== Demographics ==
=== Ethnicity ===
The Thalawathugoda West Grama Niladhari Division has a Sinhalese majority (96.0%). In comparison, the Maharagama Divisional Secretariat (which contains the Thalawathugoda West Grama Niladhari Division) has a Sinhalese majority (95.7%)

Ethnicity in Thalawathugoda West
1. Sinhalese (96.0%)
2. Sri Lankan Tamil (2.30%)
3. Other (1.70%)

=== Religion ===
The Thalawathugoda West Grama Niladhari Division has a Buddhist majority (92.2%). In comparison, the Maharagama Divisional Secretariat (which contains the Thalawathugoda West Grama Niladhari Division) has a Buddhist majority (92.0%)

Religion in Thalawathugoda West
1. Buddhist (92.2%)
2. Roman Catholic (3.00%)
3. Hindu (2.10%)
4. Other Christian (1.30%)
5. Muslim (1.30%)
6. Other (0.00%)
