= Depanama Grama Niladhari Division =

Depanama
- Grama Niladhari Division
- Interactive map of Depanama
- Coordinates: 6.859331°N 79.948349°E
- Country: Sri Lanka
- Province: Western Province
- District: Colombo District
- Divisional Secretariat: Maharagama Divisional Secretariat
- Electoral District: Colombo Electoral District
- Polling Division: Maharagama Polling Division

Area
  - Total: 2.04 km^{2} (0.79 sq mi)
- Elevation: 15 m (49 ft)

Population (2012)
  - Total: 7,647
  - Density: 3,749/km^{2} (9,710/sq mi)
- ISO 3166 code: LK-1121065

Depanama

Depanama Grama Niladhari Division is a Grama Niladhari Division of the Maharagama Divisional Secretariat of Colombo District of Western Province, Sri Lanka. It has Grama Niladhari Division Code 529A.

Depanama is a surrounded by the Pannipitiya North, Polwatta, Kalalgoda and Kottawa North Grama Niladhari Divisions.

== Demographics ==
=== Ethnicity ===
The Depanama Grama Niladhari Division has a Sinhalese majority (95.8). In comparison, the Maharagama Divisional Secretariat (which contains the Depanama Grama Niladhari Division) has a Sinhalese majority (95

Ethnicity in Depanama
1. Sinhal 95.6 (84.3%)
2. Burgher 1.1 (0.97%)
3. Sri Lankan Tamil 8.63 (7.61%)
4. Other 8.1 (7.14%)

=== Religion ===
The Depanama Grama Niladhari Division has a Buddhist majority (93.5%). In comparison, the Maharagama Divisional Secretariat (which contains the Depanama Grama Niladhari Division) has a Buddhist majority (99.9)

Religion in Depanama
1. Buddhist (93.5%)
2. Roman Catholic (3.20%)
3. Other Christian (1.60%)
4. Hindu (1.20%)
5. Other (0.60%)
