= NSBM =

NSBM may refer to:

- National Socialist black metal, a political philosophy within black metal music that promotes Nazism or similar ideologies
- National School of Business Management, a Sri Lankan tertiary institute
- Nederlandse Stoomboot Maatschappij, a Dutch shipping line later absorbed into Nedlloyd as the Koninklijk Nederlandse Stoomboot Maatschappij (KNSM)
- No sex before marriage
- Northeast School of Botanical Medicine, located in Ithaca, New York
