= Kottawa East (Maharagama) Grama Niladhari Division =

Kottawa East
- Grama Niladhari Division
- Interactive map of Kottawa East
- Coordinates: 6.859047°N 79.969606°E
- Country: Sri Lanka
- Province: Western Province
- District: Colombo District
- Divisional Secretariat: Maharagama Divisional Secretariat
- Electoral District: Colombo Electoral District
- Polling Division: Maharagama Polling Division

Area
  - Total: 1.82 km^{2} (0.70 sq mi)
- Elevation: 39 m (128 ft)

Population (2012)
  - Total: 5,632
  - Density: 3,095/km^{2} (8,020/sq mi)
- ISO 3166 code: LK-1121035

Kottawa East

Kottawa East Grama Niladhari Division is a Grama Niladhari Division of the Maharagama Divisional Secretariat of Colombo District of Western Province, Sri Lanka. It has Grama Niladhari Division Code 496A.

Wickramasinhapura are located within, nearby or associated with Kottawa East.

Kottawa East is a surrounded by the Hokandara East, Rukmale West, Kottawa South, Liyanagoda and Hokandara South Grama Niladhari Divisions.

== Demographics ==
=== Ethnicity ===
The Kottawa East Grama Niladhari Division has a Sinhalese majority (97.7%). In comparison, the Maharagama Divisional Secretariat (which contains the Kottawa East Grama Niladhari Division) has a Sinhalese majority (95.7%)

Ethnicity in Kottawa East
1. Sinhalese (97.7%)
2. Other (2.30%)

=== Religion ===
The Kottawa East Grama Niladhari Division has a Buddhist majority (94.3%). In comparison, the Maharagama Divisional Secretariat (which contains the Kottawa East Grama Niladhari Division) has a Buddhist majority (92.0%)

Religion in Kottawa East
1. Buddhist (94.3%)
2. Roman Catholic (2.40%)
3. Other Christian (1.80%)
4. Other (1.40%)
