= President's College =

President's College may refer to:

- President's College, Maharagama, a school in Maharagama, Sri Lanka
- President's College, Minuwangoda, a school in Minuwangoda, Sri Lanka
- President's College, Sri Jayawardenapura Kotte, a school in Sri Jayawardenapura Kotte, Sri Lanka
