= Maharagama East Grama Niladhari Division =

Maharagama East
- Grama Niladhari Division
- Interactive map of Maharagama East
- Coordinates: 6.858613°N 79.926812°E
- Country: Sri Lanka
- Province: Western Province
- District: Colombo District
- Divisional Secretariat: Maharagama Divisional Secretariat
- Electoral District: Colombo Electoral District
- Polling Division: Maharagama Polling Division

Area
  - Total: 0.48 km^{2} (0.19 sq mi)
- Elevation: 24 m (79 ft)

Population (2012)
  - Total: 3,695
  - Density: 7,698/km^{2} (19,940/sq mi)
- ISO 3166 code: LK-1121105

Maharagama East

Maharagama East Grama Niladhari Division is a Grama Niladhari Division of the Maharagama Divisional Secretariat of Colombo District of Western Province, Sri Lanka. It has Grama Niladhari Division Code 527B.

Maharagama East is a surrounded by the Maharagama West, Pathiragoda, Udahamulla West and Pamunuwa Grama Niladhari Divisions.

== Demographics ==
=== Ethnicity ===
The Maharagama East Grama Niladhari Division has a Sinhalese majority (94.5%). In comparison, the Maharagama Divisional Secretariat (which contains the Maharagama East Grama Niladhari Division) has a Sinhalese majority (95.7%)

Ethnicity in Maharagama East
1. Sinhalese (94.5%)
2. Other (2.20%)
3. Sri Lankan Tamil (2.00%)
4. Moor (1.20%)

=== Religion ===
The Maharagama East Grama Niladhari Division has a Buddhist majority (92.4%). In comparison, the Maharagama Divisional Secretariat (which contains the Maharagama East Grama Niladhari Division) has a Buddhist majority (92.0%)

Religion in Maharagama East
1. Buddhist (92.4%)
2. Hindu (2.70%)
3. Roman Catholic (2.20%)
4. Muslim (1.90%)
5. Other (0.80%)
