= Madiwela Grama Niladhari Division =

Madiwela
- Grama Niladhari Division
- Interactive map of Madiwela
- Coordinates: 6.877292°N 79.921487°E
- Country: Sri Lanka
- Province: Western Province
- District: Colombo District
- Divisional Secretariat: Maharagama Divisional Secretariat
- Electoral District: Colombo Electoral District
- Polling Division: Maharagama Polling Division

Area
  - Total: 1.58 km^{2} (0.61 sq mi)
- Elevation: 7 m (23 ft)

Population (2012)
  - Total: 6,244
  - Density: 3,952/km^{2} (10,240/sq mi)
- ISO 3166 code: LK-1121015

Madiwela

Madiwela Grama Niladhari Division is a Grama Niladhari Division of the Maharagama Divisional Secretariat of Colombo District of Western Province, Sri Lanka. It has Grama Niladhari Division Code 524.

Madiwela is a surrounded by the Pahalawela, Thalawathugoda West, Thalapathpitiya, Udahamulla East, Pragathipura, Mirihana North and Pitakotte East Grama Niladhari Divisions.

== Demographics ==
=== Ethnicity ===
The Madiwela Grama Niladhari Division has a Sinhalese majority (94.8%). In comparison, the Maharagama Divisional Secretariat (which contains the Madiwela Grama Niladhari Division) has a Sinhalese majority (95.7%)

Ethnicity in Madiwela
1. Sinhalese (94.8%)
2. Sri Lankan Tamil (2.20%)
3. Other (1.80%)
4. Malay (1.10%)

=== Religion ===
The Madiwela Grama Niladhari Division has a Buddhist majority (90.3%). In comparison, the Maharagama Divisional Secretariat (which contains the Madiwela Grama Niladhari Division) has a Buddhist majority (92.0%)

Religion in Madiwela
1. Buddhist (90.3%)
2. Roman Catholic (3.90%)
3. Other Christian (2.20%)
4. Hindu (1.90%)
5. Muslim (1.60%)
6. Other (0.00%)
