= Pitakotte East Grama Niladhari Division =

Pitakotte East
- Grama Niladhari Division
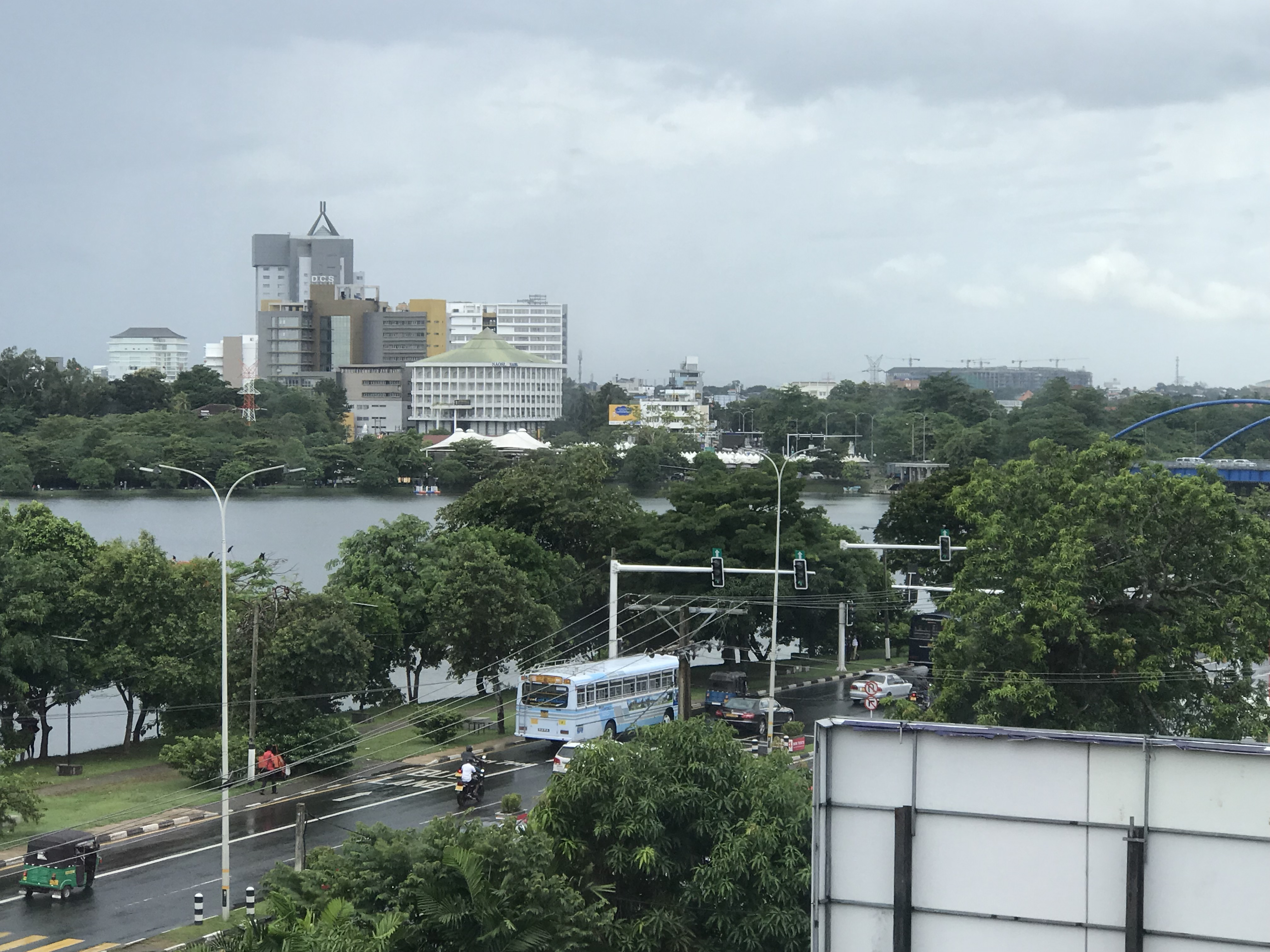
- Diyawanna Lake is located within, nearby or associated with the Pitakotte East Grama Niladhari Division
- Interactive map of Pitakotte East
- Coordinates: 6.886763°N 79.912956°E
- Country: Sri Lanka
- Province: Western Province
- District: Colombo District
- Divisional Secretariat: Sri Jayawardanapura Kotte Divisional Secretariat
- Electoral District: Colombo Electoral District
- Polling Division: Kotte Polling Division

Area
  - Total: 1.62 km^{2} (0.63 sq mi)
- Elevation: 48 m (157 ft)

Population (2012)
  - Total: 3,984
  - Density: 2,459/km^{2} (6,370/sq mi)
- ISO 3166 code: LK-1124050

Pitakotte East

Pitakotte East Grama Niladhari Division is a Grama Niladhari Division of the Sri Jayawardanapura Kotte Divisional Secretariat of Colombo District of Western Province, Sri Lanka. It has Grama Niladhari Division Code 522A.

1987 grenade attack in the Sri Lankan Parliament, Diyasaru Park, Sri Lankan Parliament Building, Parliament of Sri Lanka and Diyawanna Lake are located within, nearby or associated with Pitakotte East.

Pitakotte East is a surrounded by the Battaramulla South, Pahalawela, Madiwela, Mirihana North, Pitakotte and Ethulkotte Grama Niladhari Divisions.

== Demographics ==
=== Ethnicity ===
The Pitakotte East Grama Niladhari Division has a Sinhalese majority (91.2%). In comparison, the Sri Jayawardanapura Kotte Divisional Secretariat (which contains the Pitakotte East Grama Niladhari Division) has a Sinhalese majority (84.8%)

Ethnicity in Pitakotte East
1. Sinhalese (91.2%)
2. Sri Lankan Tamil (5.00%)
3. Other (2.20%)
4. Burgher (1.70%)

=== Religion ===
The Pitakotte East Grama Niladhari Division has a Buddhist majority (80.6%). In comparison, the Sri Jayawardanapura Kotte Divisional Secretariat (which contains the Pitakotte East Grama Niladhari Division) has a Buddhist majority (77.1%)

Religion in Pitakotte East
1. Buddhist (80.6%)
2. Roman Catholic (9.60%)
3. Other Christian (5.40%)
4. Hindu (2.70%)
5. Muslim (1.50%)
6. Other (0.10%)

== Gallery ==
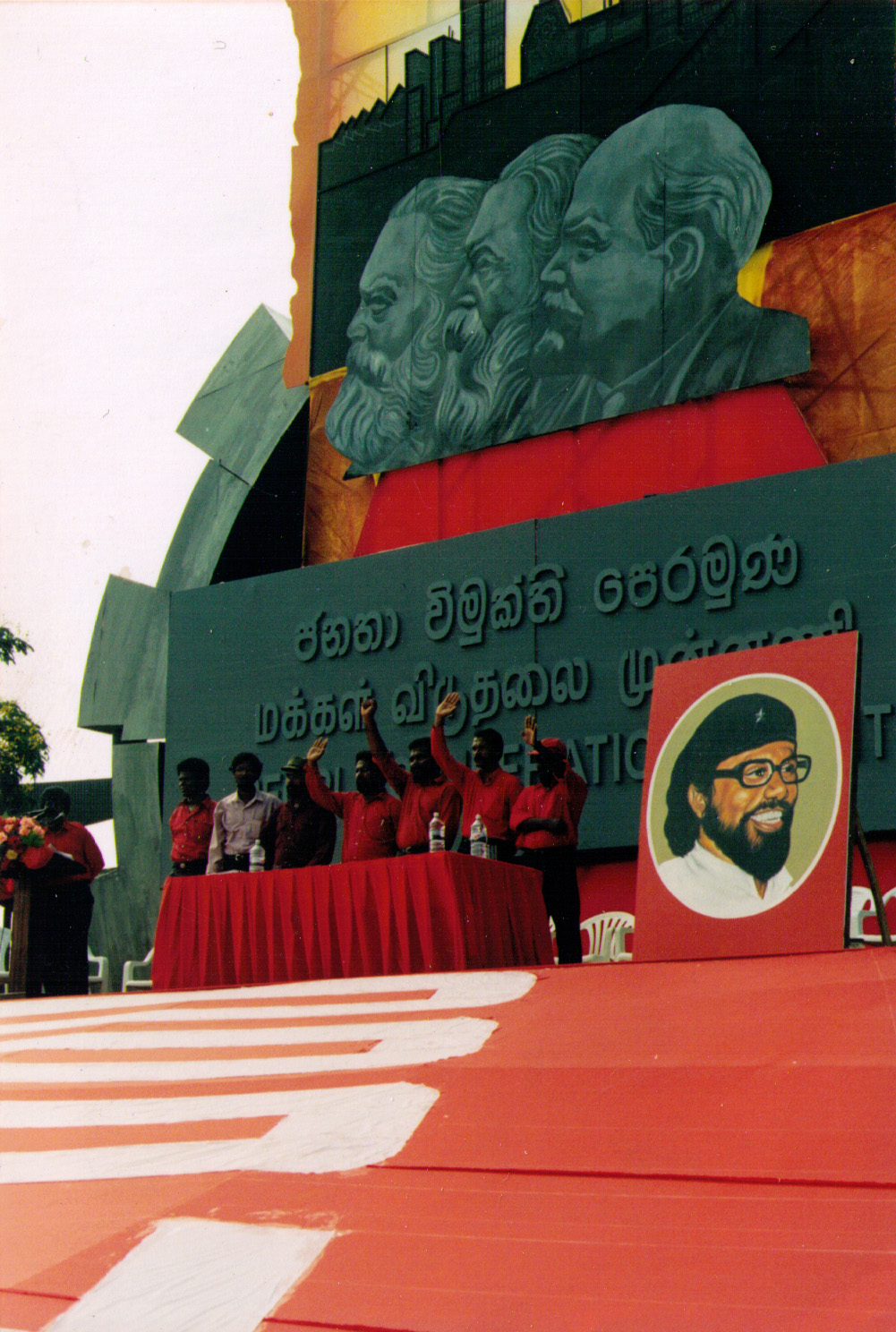
1987 grenade attack in the Sri Lankan Parliament

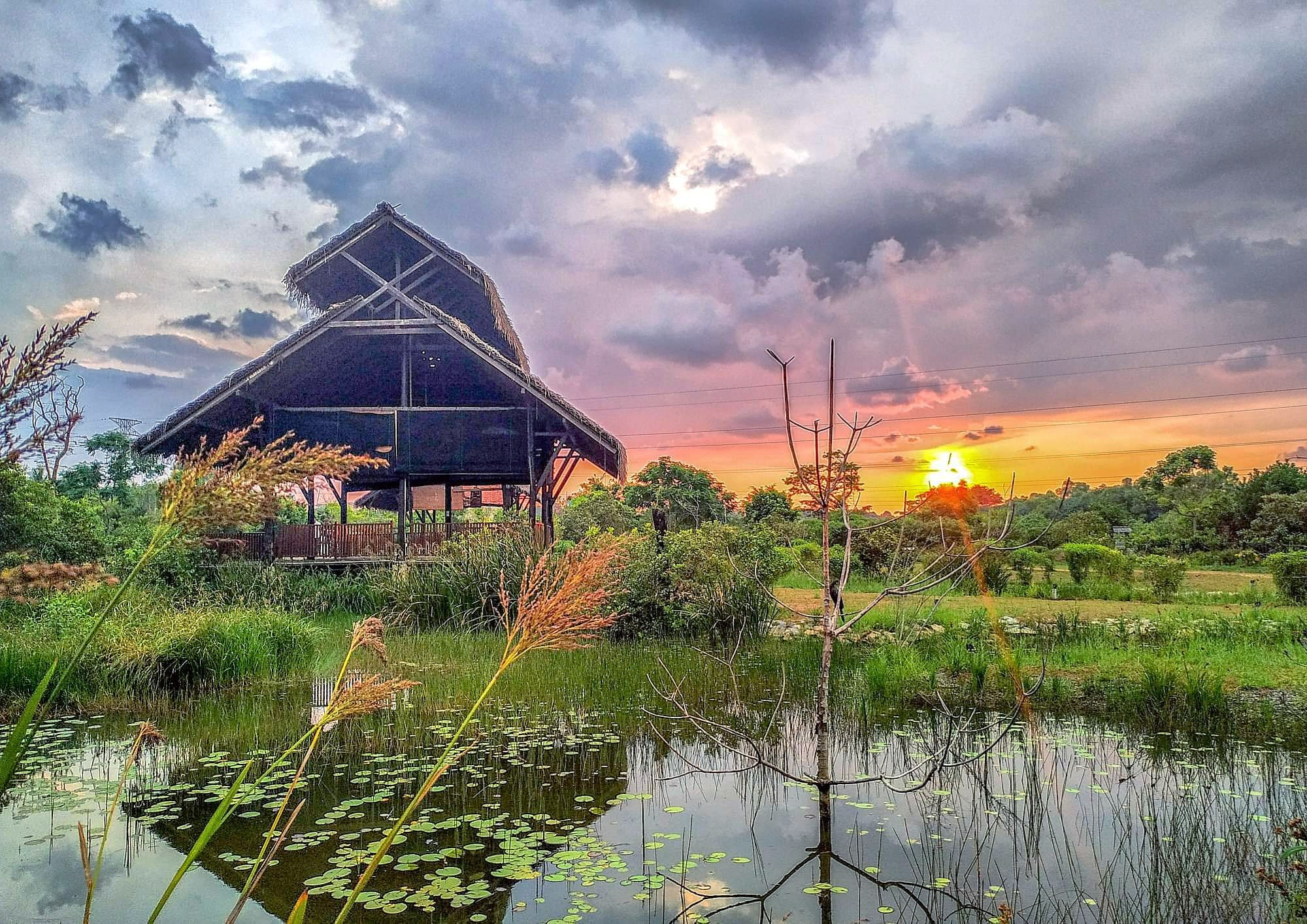
Diyasaru Park

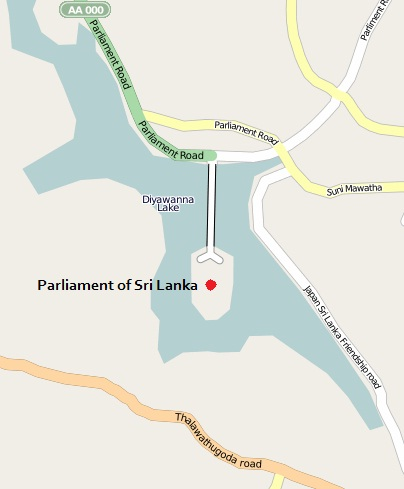
Sri Lankan Parliament Building

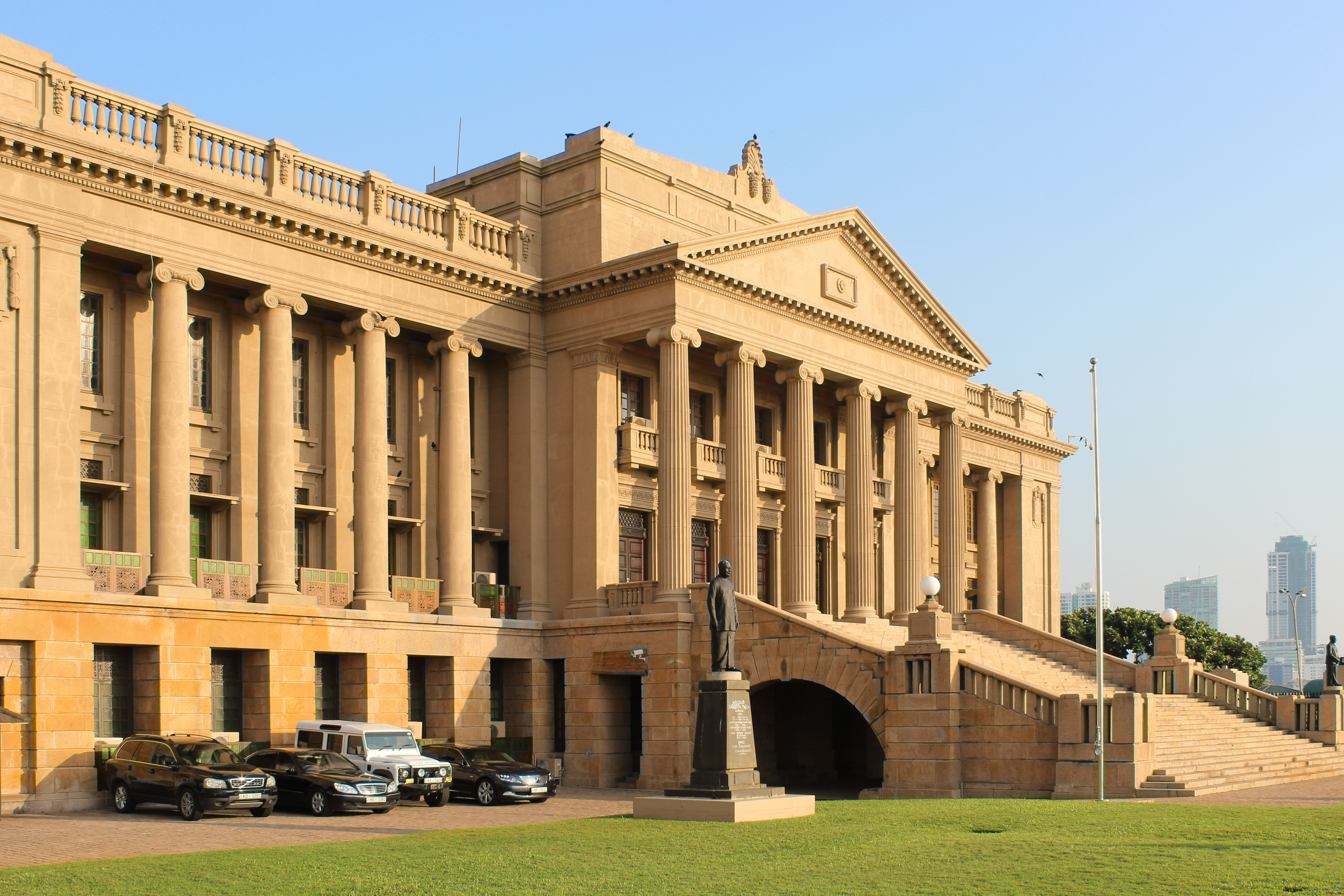
Parliament of Sri Lanka

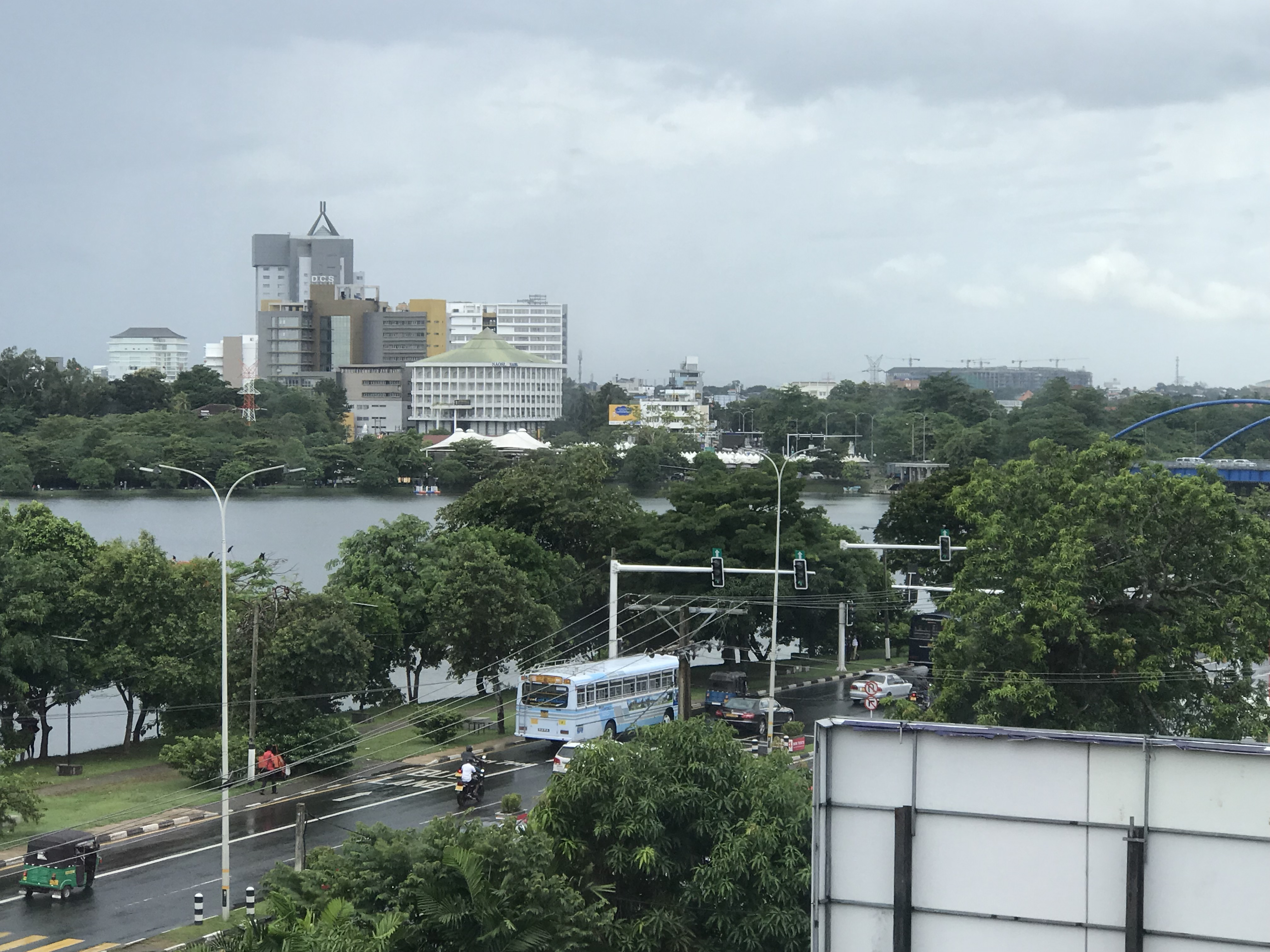
Diyawanna Lake
