= Pamunuwa =

- Sub-urban area
- Interactive map of Pamunuwa
- Country: Sri Lanka
- Province: Western Province
- District: Colombo District
- Time zone: UTC+5:30 (Sri Lanka Standard Time)

Pamunuwa is a suburb of Colombo and near to Maharagama in Sri Lanka and is famous as a destination for clothing and textile. It is located within the Western Province. From raw materials needed in textile industry to ready-made garments, Pamunuwa has been a center of attraction to people all over the country.

From people who seek bargain shops to purchase material needed for small and medium scale clothing and tailoring businesses to people who seeks clothing items at competitive bargain prices are eventually drawn to Pamunuwa. Thousands of people visit Pamunuwa area in each and every day, with this amount is enormously increased in Sinhalese New Year season in April. However, with hundreds of small shops and stalls and a large number of big shops, Pamunuwa is crowded from the early morning until the evening.

The Maharagama Railways station is also located at the border of Pamunuwa area.
