= Ghafooriya Arabic College =

College in Maharagama, Sri Lanka

The Ghafooriya Arabic College (GAC) is a college in Sri Lanka in the city of Maharagama. It offers six-years higher diploma level Arabic and Islamic courses. Students who complete the diploma here may choose to attend higher degrees abroad. The college was established in 1931 by N.D.H. Ghafoor Hajiar.
