= National School of Business Management =

Degree awarding institution situated in Colombo, Sri Lanka

Coordinates: 6.82098°N 80.03860°E

NSBM Green University
- ජාතික ව්‍යාපාර කළමනාකාරීත්ව විද්‍යායතනය தேசிய வியாபார முகாமைத்துவ பாடசாலை
- Motto: Find Greatness in Every Step
- Type: Government-recognised institute
- Established: 2011; 15 years ago
- Accreditation: Ministry of Education, Higher Education and Vocational Education; University Grants Commission
- Affiliations: University of Plymouth, UK; Victoria University, Australia; Southern Cross University,Australia; American University, USA
- Vice-Chancellor: Prof. E A Weerasinghe
- Deputy Vice-Chancellor: Prof. Chaminda Rathnayake
- Academic staff: 125
- Students: ~10,000
- Location: Homagama, Colombo, Sri Lanka
- Colors: Green & Blue
- Website: www.nsbm.ac.lk

The National School of Business Management- NSBM Green University (Sinhala: ජාතික ව්‍යාපාර කළමනාකාරීත්ව විද්‍යායතනය, Tamil: தேசிய வியாபார முகாமைத்துவ பாடசாலை) (also known as NSBM Green University Sinhala: NSBM හරිත සරසවිය, Tamil: NSBM பசுமைப் பல்கலைக்கழகம்) is a state owned and government recognized degree awarding institute in Sri Lanka. It was granted the degree awarding status by the Ministry of Education under Section 25A of the Universities Act No. 16 of 1978 and established under the Companies Act No. 07 of 2007 having the registration Number PB 4833.

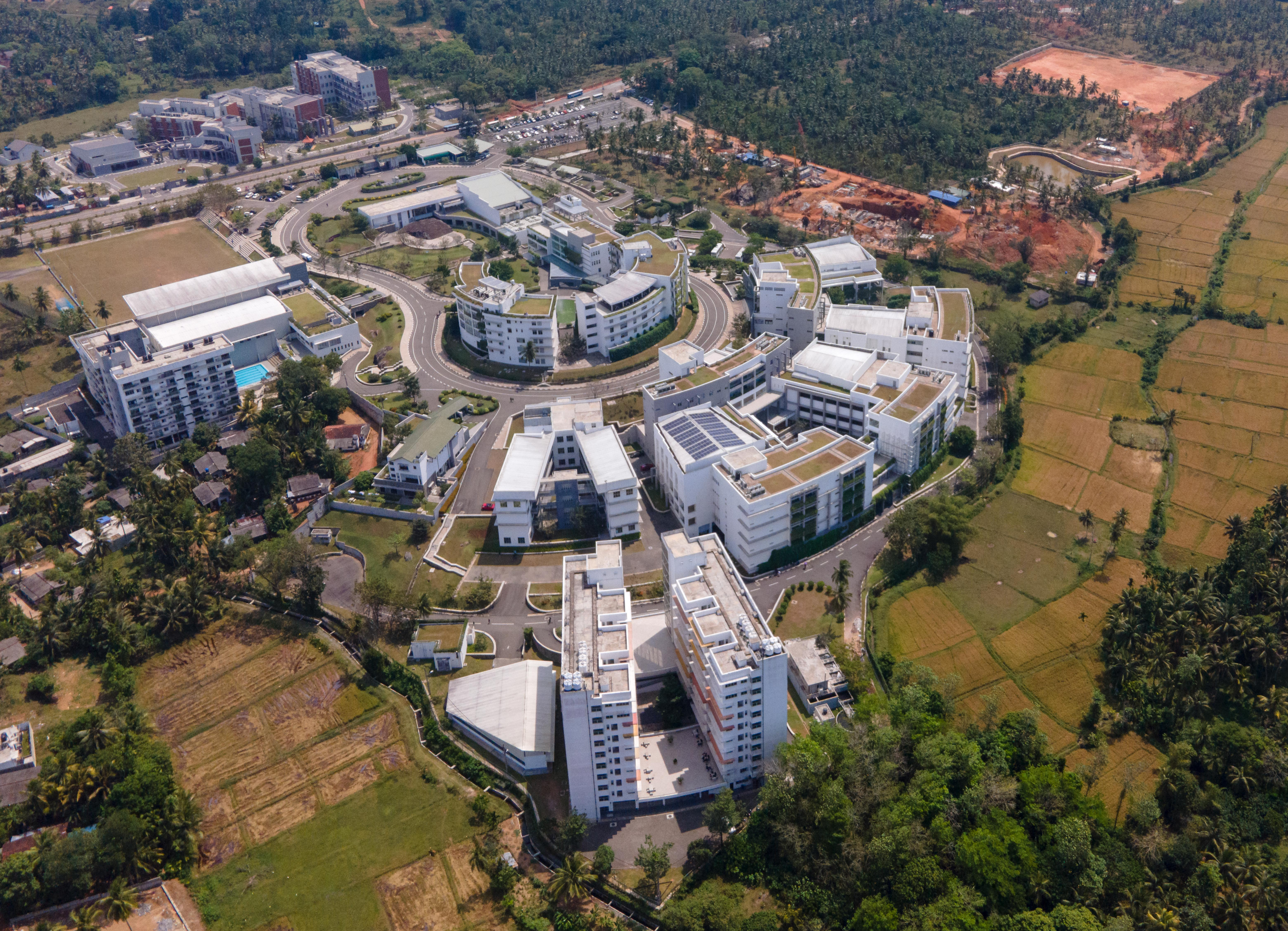
NSBM Green University, Sri Lanka

NSBM Green University offers undergraduate and postgraduate degrees in the fields of Business, Computing, Engineering, Science and Design. It is located in Pitipana, Homagama, in the Colombo suburbs.

== History ==
NSBM Green University was founded in 2011 as the degree awarding university under the National Institute of Business Management to award undergraduate and post-graduate degrees. Followed by a series of government protocols, the approval was granted to set up a higher education institute named National School of Business Management (NSBM). It was registered as a limited company under the Companies Act No. 7 of 2007. The first board of directors of the company was appointed in July 2011, consisting of 5 members. In the wake of the discussions about the location of the proposed institute, a land of 26 acres in Pitipana, Homagama was selected and later obtained in December 2011. The NSBM Green University Town project's construction work officially began at an investment of 10.2 billion LKR in 2013, after clearing government sanctions and approvals. While the construction was underway, NSBM commenced its operations as a city campus.

NSBM city campus was launched in Nugegoda with a modest organizational structure consisting of School of Business, School of Computing, Finance Division, and Administration Division. On 25 February 2012, it officially began the education delivery process inaugurating the first set of students for the University College Dublin and the UGC approved degree programs. Later the same year, the city campus expanded its presence with the addition of three new buildings in close proximity to the main building. Over the period of the next four years since its inception, the city campus continued till it was moved to NSBM Green University Town premises. Along the way, more undergraduate and postgraduate degrees programs and new academic partnerships were added to the NSBM profile. These comprise the Management, Computing, Engineering, and Design degrees offered by NSBM or affiliated with Plymouth University, UK, Victoria University, Australia and Limkokwing University of Creative Technology, Malaysia.

The construction of the NSBM Green University Town was carried out by MAGA Engineering (Pvt.) Ltd together with the design and consultation of Engineering Consultancy (Pvt.) Ltd. On 26 October 2016, the newly constructed university complex was ceremonially declared open, concluding a construction project spanned over two years and ten months.

NSBM commenced the construction of Phase II of the NSBM Green University Project in 2021, adding another 14 acres adjoining the university premises. This new addition plans to house several new facilities including three new faculties: Medicine, Law, and Health Science. Moreover, NSBM envisions Phase III developments in another 20 acres of land, which will include infrastructure for medical and engineering studies.

== Administration and governance ==
The highest administration and academic official of NSBM Green University is the Vice Chancellor/CEO. The Vice Chancellor chairs the NSBM board of directors and also serves as the head of the university Senate, Audit committee, and the Senior management. The position is currently held by Prof. E.A. Weerasinghe, the founder of the university.

The Deputy Vice Chancellor is the second highest administration and academic official of NSBM Green University. Prof. Chaminda Rathnayake presently serves as the Deputy Vice Chancellor.

The board of directors is the governing and executive body of NSBM Green University. The Board consists of 15 members. It is responsible for the management, finance, property, investment and general operations of NSBM. The Senate is the supreme academic body for Academic Governance at NSBM Green University.

== Academic Profile ==
=== Admission ===
The student selection and the admission procedure of NSBM Green University is carried out independently by the university itself. NSBM offers two intakes annually. The 1st intake usually starts in March, whereas the 2nd intake begins in October each year. The students need to apply directly to the university. The student selection is carried out based on the student admission policy of NSBM, considering the standard examination results and institutional requirements.

NSBM also offers admission to the students applied under the Interest Free Student Loan Scheme introduced by the State Ministry of Higher Education in which the ministry manages the application and registration process.

=== Faculties and Departments ===
A range of undergraduate, postgraduate and professional/ executive programs are taught at NSBM through a network of faculties and departments.

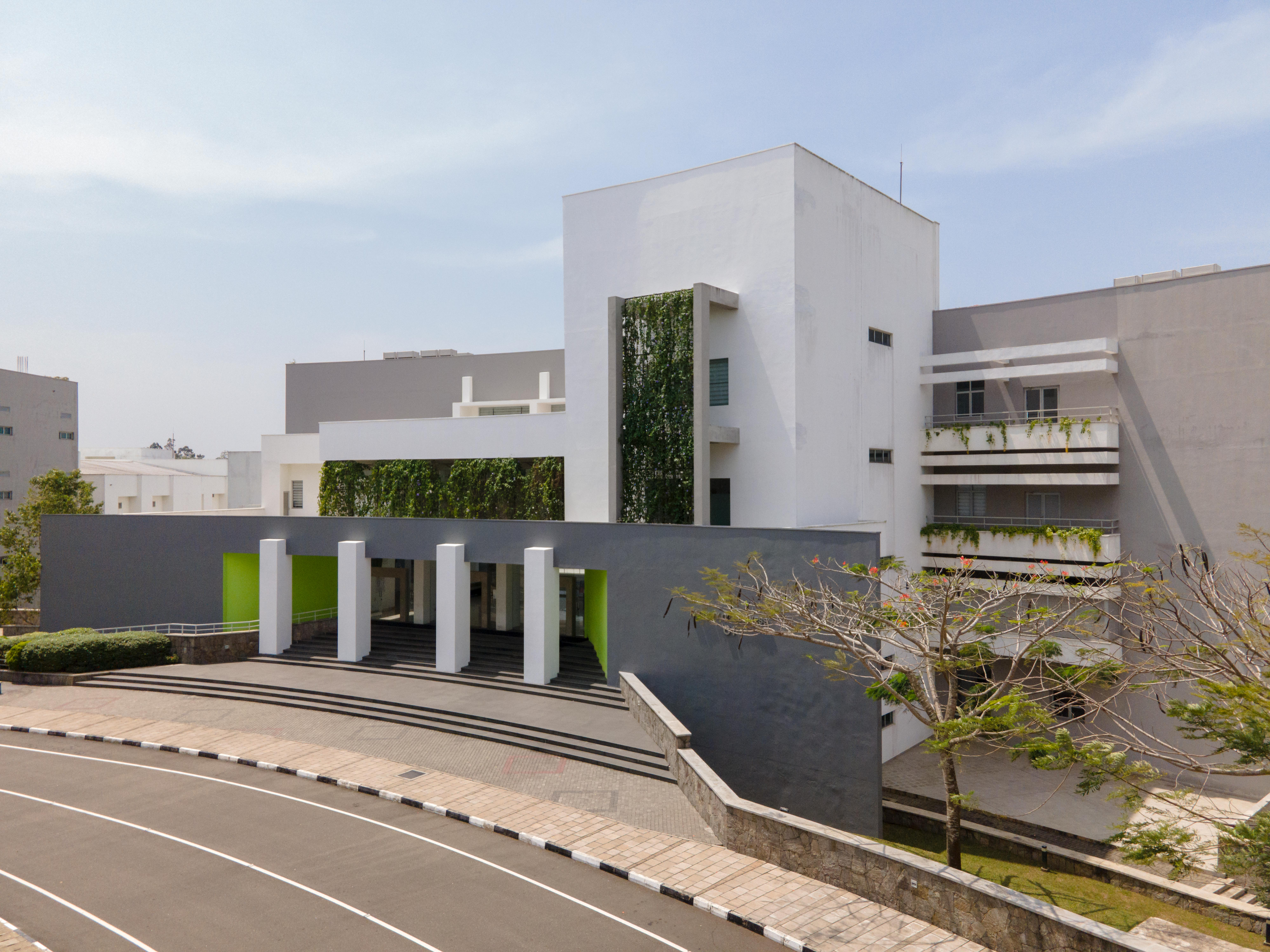
Faculty of Business

==== Faculty of Business ====
Faculty of Business of NSBM offers BSc., BBM, BM, BA, Bachelor of Business and Bachelor of Laws degree programs in the fields of Business, Management, Commerce and Law, including disciplines associated with Accounting, Finance, International business, Industrial Management, Project management, Logistics management, Human resource management, Tourism and Hospitality Management, Marketing management, Business Economics, Business Analytics, Business communication, Law and Business Studies, Law and International Trade and Law and E-Commerce. It is also the largest faculty of NSBM Green University, in terms of student population.

===== Departments and Relevant Degree Programs =====
Department of Legal Studies

- Bachelor of Laws (Honours) – (UGC Approved – Offered By NSBM)
- BM (Hons) in Law and Business Studies (UGC Approved – Offered By NSBM)
- BM (Hons.) in Law and International Trade (UGC Approved – Offered By NSBM)
- BM (Hons) in Law and E-Commerce (UGC Approved – Offered By NSBM)
- LLB (Hons) Law (Plymouth University – United Kingdom)

Department of Economics and Decision Sciences

- BM (Honors) in Business Analytics – (UGC Approved – Offered By NSBM)
- BM (Honors) in Business Economics – (UGC Approved – Offered By NSBM)

Department of Operations and Logistics

- BSc (Hons) Operations and Logistics Management – (Plymouth University – United Kingdom)
- BSc in Business Management (Industrial Management) (Special) – (UGC Approved – Offered By NSBM)
- BSc in Business Management (Project Management) (Special) – (UGC Approved – Offered By NSBM)
- BSc in Business Management (Logistics Management) (Special) – (UGC Approved – Offered By NSBM)
- Bachelor of Business: Management and Innovation & Supply Chain and Logistics Management – (Victoria University – Australia)

Department of Marketing and Tourism Management

- BBM (Hons) Tourism, Hospitality & Events – (UGC Approved – Offered By NSBM)
- BSc in Multimedia – (UGC Approved – Offered By NSBM)
- BM (Hons) in Marketing Management (UGC Approved – Offered By NSBM)
- BSc (Hons) Events, Tourism and Hospitality Management – (Plymouth University – United Kingdom)
- BSc (Hons) Marketing Management – (Plymouth University – United Kingdom)
- BSc (Hons) Business Communication – (Plymouth University – United Kingdom)
- BA in Business Communication – (UGC Approved – Offered By NSBM)

Department of Accounting and Finance

- BSc (Hons) Accounting and Finance – (Plymouth University – United Kingdom)
- BM (Hons) in Accounting and Finance – (UGC Approved – Offered By NSBM)

Department of Management

- Foundation Programme for bachelor's degree
- BSc (Hons) International Management and Business – (Plymouth University – United Kingdom)
- BM (Hons) in International Business – (UGC Approved – Offered By NSBM)
- Bachelor of Business: Management and Innovation & Supply Chain and Logistics Management – (Victoria University – Australia)
- BSc in Business Management (Human Resource Management) (Special) – (UGC Approved – Offered By NSBM)

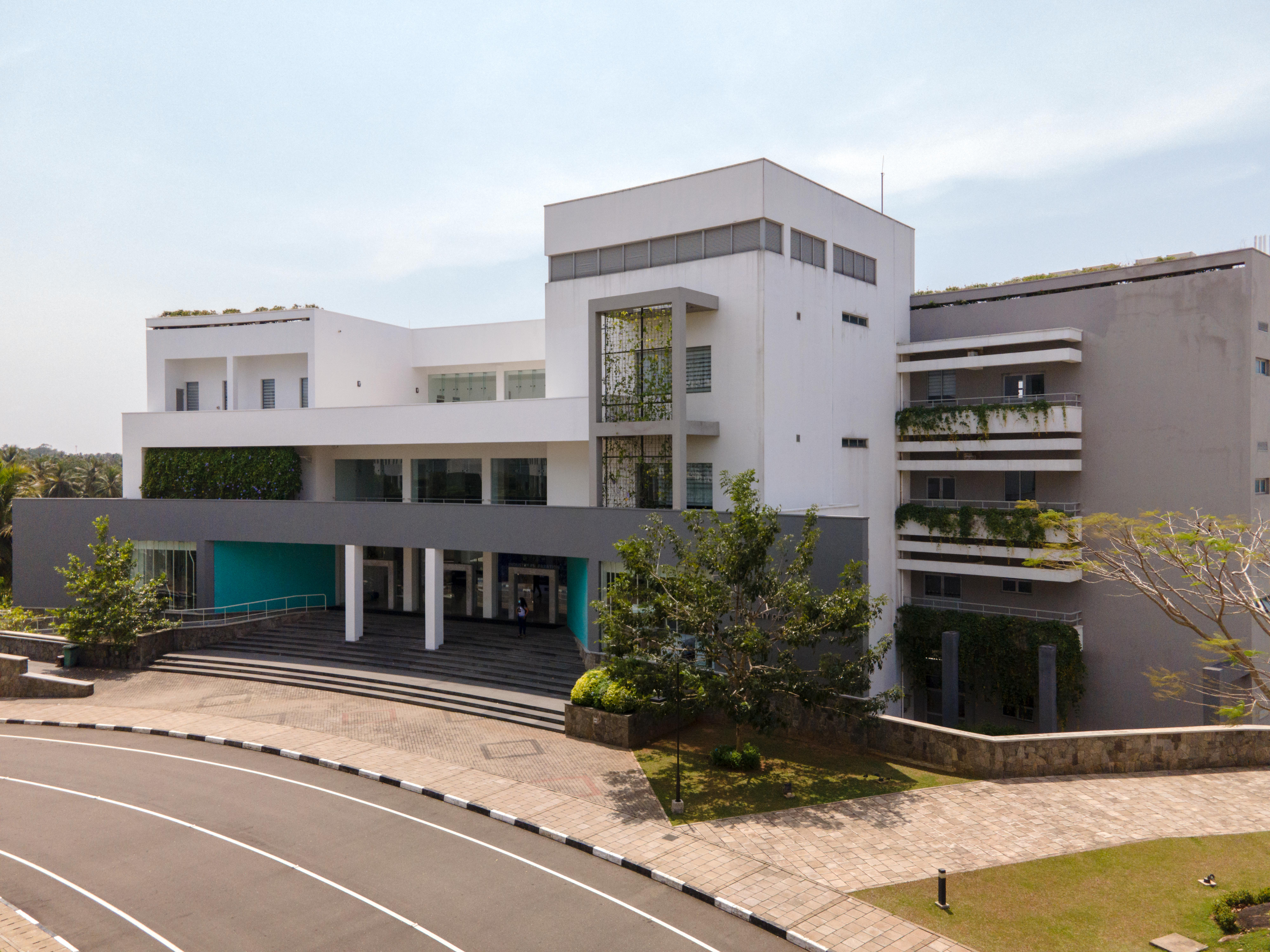
Faculty of Computing

==== Faculty of Computing ====
The Faculty of Computing provides education and training in the areas of Computer science, Software Engineering, Computer networks, Management information systems, Data science, Cyber Security, Computer security and Information technology at undergraduate and postgraduate levels.

===== Departments and Relevant Degree Programs =====
Department of Computer and Data Science

- BSc (Hons) Computer Science – (Plymouth University – United Kingdom)
- BSc (Hons) in Computer Science – (UGC Approved – Offered By NSBM)
- BSc (Honours) in Data Science – (UGC Approved – Offered By NSBM)
- BSc (Hons) in Data Science – (Plymouth University – United Kingdom)

Department of Computer Security and Network Systems

- BSc (Hons) Computer Networks – (Plymouth University – United Kingdom)
- BSc (Hons) Computer Security – (Plymouth University – United Kingdom)
- Bachelor of Information Technology (Major in Cyber Security) – (Victoria University – Australia)
- BSc (Hons) in Computer Networks – (UGC Approved – Offered By NSBM)

Department of Software Engineering & Information Systems

- BSc (Hons) Software Engineering – (Plymouth University – United Kingdom)
- BSc (Hons) in Software Engineering – (UGC Approved – Offered By NSBM)
- BSc (Hons) Technology Management – (Plymouth University – United Kingdom)
- BSc in Management Information Systems (Special) – (UGC Approved – Offered By NSBM)
- Foundation Programme for bachelor's degree

==== Faculty of Engineering ====
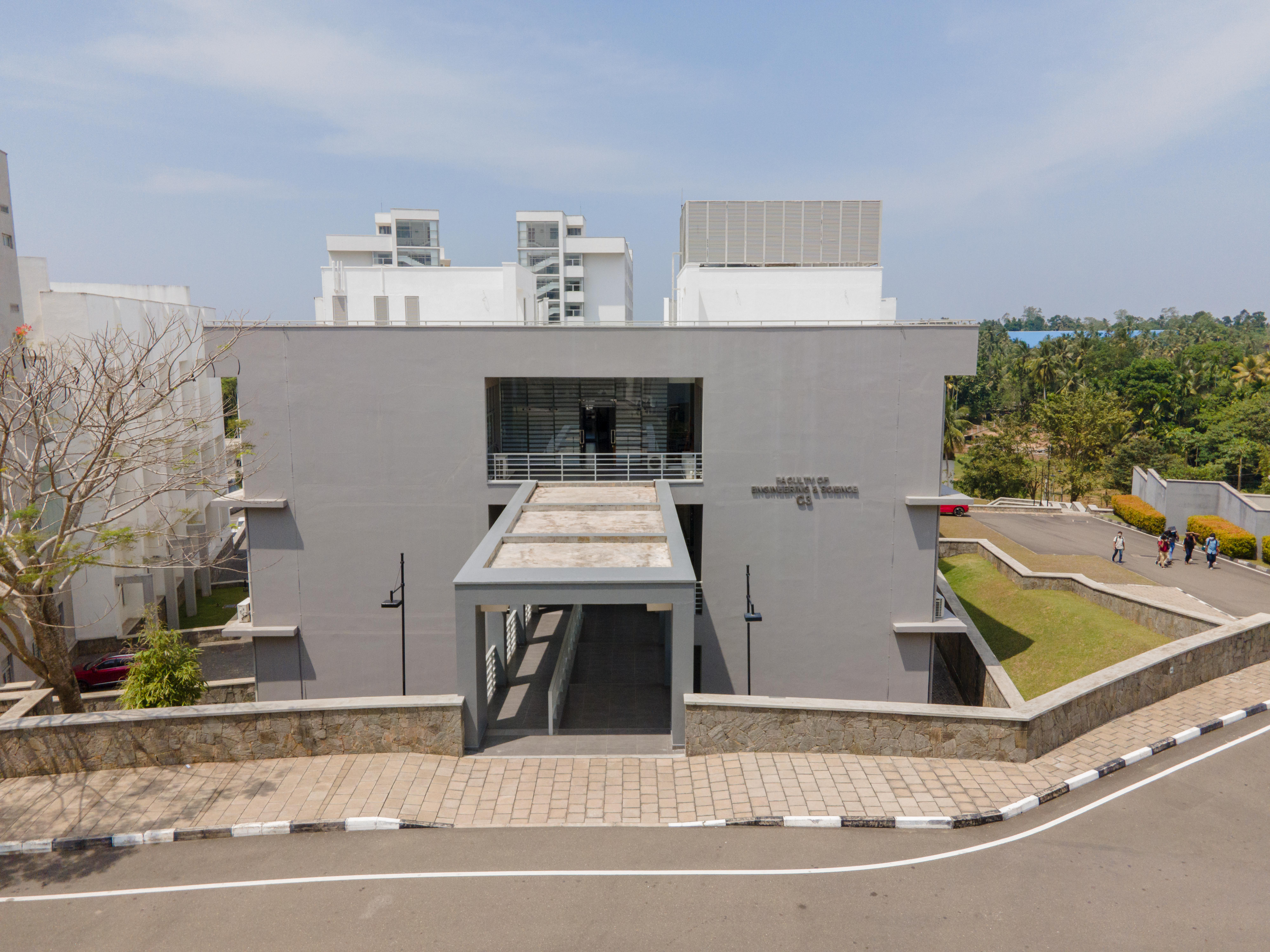
Faculty of Engineering and Faculty of Science

Engineering, Quantity surveying, Interior design, and Multimedia degree programs are conducted under the Faculty of Engineering.

===== Departments and Relevant Degree Programs =====
Department of Electrical, Electronic and Systems Engineering

- Bachelor of Science of Engineering Honours in Electrical and Electronic Engineering – (UGC Approved – Offered By NSBM)
- Bachelor of Science of Engineering Honours in Computer Systems Engineering – (UGC Approved – Offered By NSBM)
- BEng (Hons) Electrical, Electronics, and Communication Engineering (Plymouth University – United Kingdom)

Department of Mechatronic and Industry Engineering

- Bachelor of Science of Engineering Honours in Mechatronic Engineering – (UGC Approved – Offered By NSBM)
- BEng (Hons) Civil and Structural Engineering – (Plymouth University – United Kingdom)
- BEng (Hons) Mechanical and Mechatronics (Plymouth University – United Kingdom)
- BEng (Hons) Robotics and Automation Engineering (Plymouth – United Kingdom)

Department of Design Studies

- Bachelor of Interior Design – (UGC Approved – Offered By NSBM)
- BSc (Hons) Quantity Surveying – (Plymouth University – United Kingdom)
- BA (Hons) in Interior Design – (Plymouth University – United Kingdom)
- BSc (Hons) Architecture -(Plymouth University – United Kingdom)

==== Faculty of Science ====
The Faculty of Science, offers BSc. Degrees in Biomedical Science, Health & Nutrition, Pharmaceutical Science, Psychology and Nursing under the Department of Biomedical Science.

===== Departments and Relevant Degree Programs =====
Department of Life Sciences

- BSc (Hons) in Biomedical Science – (Offered By NSBM Green University)
- BSc (Hons) in Pharmaceutical Science (Offered By NSBM Green University)
- BSc (Hons) Nutrition and Health (Offered By NSBM Green University)
- BSc (Hons) Biomedical Science – (Offered by Plymouth University – United Kingdom)

Department of Health Sciences

- BSc (Hons) Psychology – (Offered by Plymouth University – United Kingdom)
- BSc (Hons) Nursing – (Offered by Plymouth University – United Kingdom)
- BSc (Hons) Nursing – Top up – (Offered by Plymouth University – United Kingdom)
- Foundation Programme for bachelor's degree

==== Faculty of Postgraduate Studies and Professional Advancement ====
The Faculty of Postgraduate Studies and Professional Advancement is the latest addition to the network of faculties at NSBM. It is responsible for conducting and facilitating postgraduate education in the university through programs ranging from doctoral studies(PhD), master's degrees and professional advancement programs.

=== Research ===
NSBM Green University conducts international and local university collaborative research projects, international research conferences, industry lead collaborative research, and research specialized workshops and training under the NSBM Research Council. The university provides internal/external research grants for impactful research of both the staff and the students.

The university has 10 research centers under the NSBM Research Council. The existing research-led initiatives in NSBM include the International Conference on Business Innovation(ICOBI), which has been taking place since 2018, the NSBM Journal of Management, a refereed academic journal published bi-annually providing a scholarly platform for critical and informed articles in all fields of management, and the Business Dialogue magazine, the bi-annual magazine through which the university actively engages with the industry in search of research collaborations and partnerships.

=== Affiliations and memberships ===
==== Affiliations ====
NSBM Green University has been partnered up with several international universities since its establishment. Currently, NSBM through its partnerships with University of Plymouth, United Kingdom and Victoria University, Australia offer degrees in the fields of Business, Computing, Engineering, Law, Science, Interior Design and Quantity Surveying.

University	Country
University of Plymouth	United Kingdom
Victoria University	Australia
Southern Cross University	Australia
American University	United States of America

==== Memberships ====
NSBM is a member of the Association to Advance Collegiate Schools of Business (AACSB International), Association of Commonwealth Universities (ACU), Institutional Membership of Asia Pacific Quality Network (APQN), and United Nations initiative of Sustainable Development Solutions Network (SDSN).

== Student life ==
=== Clubs and Societies ===
There are over 50 student-led clubs and societies registered at NSBM Green University. They are categorized as Academic Clubs, Activity-Based Clubs, International Clubs, Sports Clubs, and Religious Clubs. They all serve the common purpose of personality development and networking.

=== Sports ===
NSBM has more than 16 sports clubs, of which many participated and secured victories in several international and national sports championships and tournaments.

Further, the university organized and hosted many sports leagues, sports festivals, and colors awarding ceremonies.

=== Special Events ===
NSBM is home to various special events. The university conducted many special events, from religious events to community development projects and entertaining events in support of the active social life at the university.

=== Career Guidance ===
NSBM carries out student career guidance, student internship placement, and graduate job placement through the NSBM for Career and Entrepreneurship (NFORCE). The unit is also responsible for organizing career fairs, industry visits, workshops, professional development programs, and guest lectures while maintaining industry partnerships.

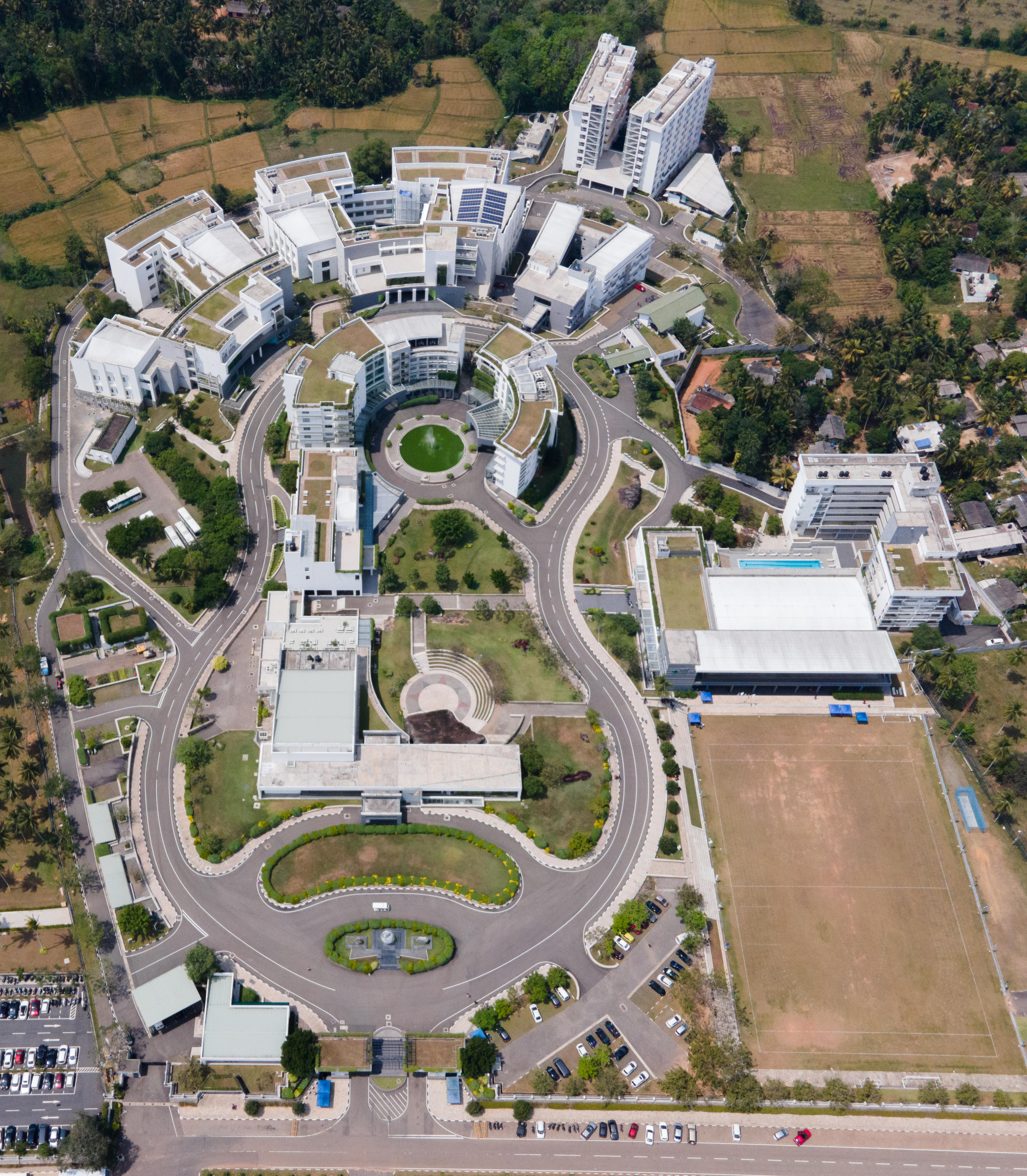
Buildings and Road Network of NSBM Green University

== Campus ==
=== Academic and Administration Buildings ===
The NSBM Green University declared open in 2016, is a purpose-built building complex spread over an area of 26 acres in Homagama. The building complex mainly comprises the Main Auditorium, Program Office, Student Centre, Library, Administration Building, and the buildings housing the faculties. These buildings are connected with a road network giving easy access. The facilities provided in this building complex include lecture halls, laboratories, library, audio-visual facility, IT facility, medical center, bookshop, cafeterias, restaurant, mini supermarket, salon, gift shop, banking facility, study areas, and open-air theatre.

=== Sports and Recreation Buildings ===
The university town houses a recreational building which consists of a gymnasium, outdoor sports ground, cricket nets and an observation deck, pavilion, and tiered seating for over 600 average spectators, a swimming pool with six lanes, and a multi-purpose indoor sports building including a basketball court, badminton court and a table tennis court.

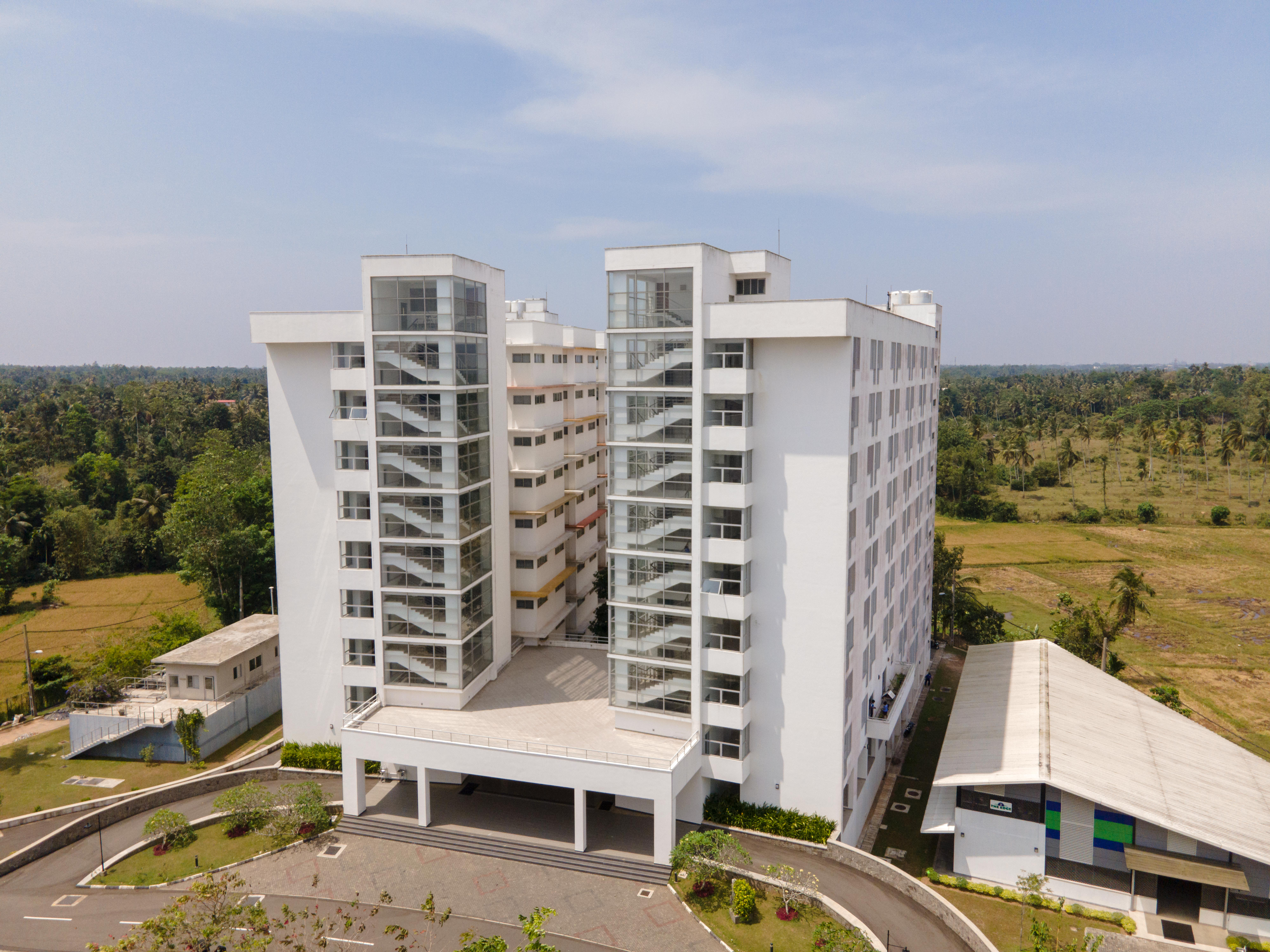
Student Accommodation

=== Accommodation ===
The university provides student and staff accommodation facilities. The student accommodation facility of 10 floors has the capacity to house nearly 500 students with over 250 fully furnished bedrooms on a twin sharing basis. There is a choice of apartments available for staff in a building of seven floors.

=== NSBM Green University Town Phase II ===
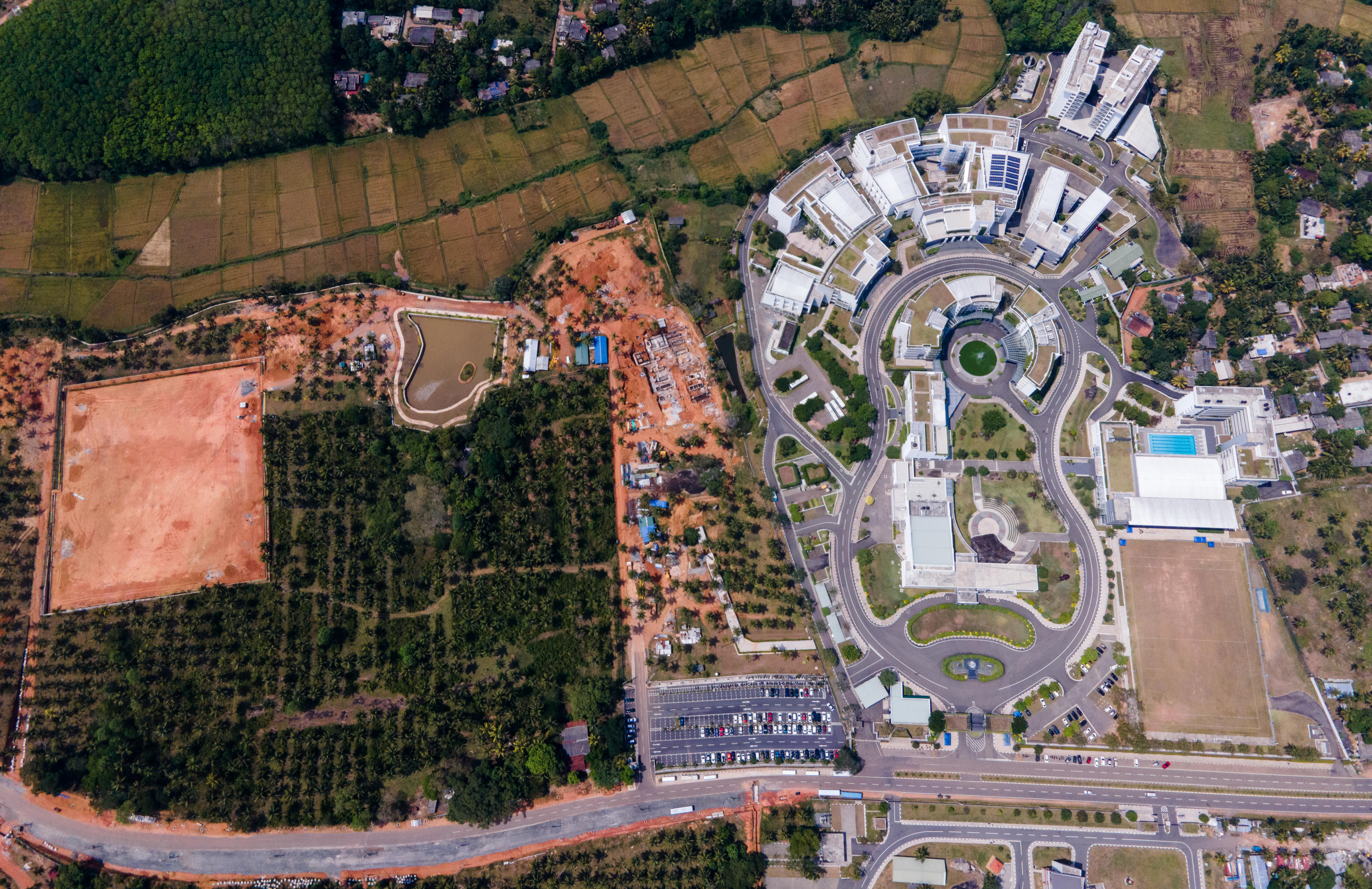
NSBM Green University Town Phase II

NSBM also announced plans to build new faculty buildings and student accommodation facilities on another 15 acres adjoining the existing university premises, under NSBM Green University Town Phase II project. With the new addition the university premises is presently spread over an extent of 41 acres. The facility centers, when complete, will enhance the university's capacity in the areas of imparting education, accommodation, recreation as well ancillary services.

== Environmental Sustainability ==
NSBM Green University has adopted many green practices and maintained environmental sustainability, aligning with its 'Green University' concept. Accordingly, defining the theme 'In harmony with nature', the university has developed sub-themes such as reducing the potential environmental impact, focusing on reducing energy, water and waste management, improving indoor environmental quality for better health well-being, and providing direction for continual improvement.

NSBM received the gold certificate for two consecutive years in 2019 and 2020, under Singapore affiliated CIOB (Ceylon Institute of Builders) Green Mark rating system, certifying that it has maintained the required Green Building Standards for the gold level of certification.
