= Homagama =

Homagama හෝමාගම ஓமகிராமம்
- Suburb
- Location within Colombo District
- Coordinates: 6°50′35.79″N 80°0′11.46″E
- Country: Sri Lanka
- Province: Western Province
- District: Colombo District

Government
  - Chairman: Kasun Rathnayaka

Population (2024)
  - Total: 280 771 (DS Division); 2,330 (Homagama Town GN Division)
- Time zone: UTC+5:30 (SLT)
- Postal Code: 10200

Homagama is a town in the Colombo District, Sri Lanka, about 24 kilometres (15 mi) south-east of Colombo. The Homagama Pradeshiya Sabha consists of the Homagama Divisional Secretariat and 10 GN division of Padukka DS division. The total Land area is about is 137 square kilometres (53 mi^{2}) of 91 GN division. The Pradeshiya Sabha was established under act No 15 of 1987, and has the highest population of any pradeshiya sabha area in Sri Lanka.

== Economy ==
Homagama is home to many research institutes and universities. These include the Technology faculty of University of Colombo, campus of the National School of Business Management (NSBM), Sri Lanka Institute of Nanotechnology and its Nanoscience Park, Centre for Defence Research and Development, Data Centre of Sri Lanka Telecom and the Sri Lanka Institute of Biotechnology as well as the Buddhist and Pali University of Sri Lanka.

Major manufacturers include Ceylon Biscuits Limited (CBL) and the Laxapana Battery Company.

== Demographics ==
Data is drawn from the 2012 national census. This data applies to the Homagama Divisonal Secretariat

No	Ethnicity	Population	% Of Total
1	Sinhalese	233,436	98.12
2	Sri Lankan Tamils	2,032	0.85
3	Sri Lankan Moors	596	0.25
4	Indian Tamils	410	0.17
5	Other	1,431	0.60
6	Total	237,905	100

Religious composition \ Buddhists 228,829-96.19% \ Roman Catholics 3,618-1.52% \ Other Christians 2,097-0.88% \ Hindus 1,827-0.77% \ Islam 1,484-0.62% \ Others 50-0.02% \

== Transport ==
Homagama sits along the A4 Highway connecting it to both Colombo and Avissawella and beyond. The town is served by two rail lines (Kelani Valley and Homagama) with 66 trains a day connecting Homagama's two rail stations (one located 300 m north of Homagama junction along the Athurugiriya road and one opposite the Homagama hospital) with Maradana and Avissawella.

Homagama is also served by a significant bus service both internally and as through-routes:

Through-routes

- 69/122 – Maharagama – Kandy
- 18/122 Hatton
- 98/122 Ampara
- 99 – Colombo – Badulla – Welimada – Passara
- 122 – Colombo – Avissawella – Ratnapura – Embilipitiya – Sooriyawewa – Rakwana – Sewanagala – Urubokka
- 124 – Maharagama – Ihala Bope
- 125 – Pettah – Padukka – Ingiriya
- 128 – Kottawa – Kiriwattuduwa – Yakahaluwa
- 128/1 – Maharagama – Munamalewatta
- 129 – Kottawa – Moragahahena
- 138/4 Henegama – Pettah
- 138/128 Thalagala – Pettah
- 366/138 Dimuthulanda – Pettah

Routes originating from/terminating at Homagama

- 126 – NSBM (via Godagama)
- 128 – Kottawa – Thalagala (via Homagama Hospital)
- 128/1 – Maharagama – Munamalewatte (via Homagama)
- 128/2 – Temple Junction
- 128/3 – Govijanapadaya
- 128/6 – Kuruduwatte (via kahathuduwa)
- 138 – Pettah (via Kottawa, Maharagama, Nugegoda, Kirulapana, Thummulla, Slave Island, Fort)
- 149 – Piliyandala (via Kahathuduwa)
- 203 – Horagala (via Godagama / old Rd Meegoda / Dampe / Horagala West)
- 219 – Hanwella (via Meegoda)
- 293 – Hanwella (via Godagama)
- 299 – Lenegala (via Nawalamulla Road)
- 299/1 – Nawalamulla
- 299/2 – Walpita
- 308 – Maharagama (via Niyandagala & Kottawa)
- 313 – Kalubowila (via Nugegoda)
- 366 – Halbarawa (via Godagama / Old Rd Wataraka / Horagala East / Halbarawa )
- 366/1 – Horagala (via Godagama / Old Rd Wataraka / Horagala West)
- 392 – Migodadeniya
- 697 – Kaduwela (via Athurugiriya)
- 698 – Kaduwela (via Panagoda)
