= Maharagama =

Maharagama මහරගම (Sinhala) மகரகம (Tamil)
- Suburb
- Location within Colombo District
- Coordinates: 6°50′58″N 79°55′25″E
- Country: Sri Lanka
- Province: Western Province
- District: Colombo District

Government
  - Type: Urban Council

Population (2012)
  - Total: 195,355
- Time zone: UTC+5:30 (SLT)
- Postal Code: 10280

Maharagama is an outer suburb of Colombo, Sri Lanka on the High-Level (A4) Road about 10 km (6.2 mi) from the centre of the commercial capital. It developed rapidly in the 1980s as a dormitory suburb. Governed by the Maharagama Urban Council, the town possesses facilities like supermarkets, department stores, clothing, food and beverages shops to fulfill the needs of citizens.

There are number of bus routes passing the area and starting from the suburb that connect Maharagama to all the suburbs. The Sri Lanka Transport Board has a depot in Maharagama.

== Maharagama Urban Council ==
=== Zone ===
- Mirihana
- Madivela
- Thalawathugoda
- Kottawa
- Pannipitiya
- Maharagama
- Godigamuwa

== Demographics ==
According to the census of 2012, the demographics of Maharagama by religion and ethnicity is as follows.

Religious & Ethnic Identification in Maharagama Urban Council area
	2012	Percentage
Buddhist	179,649	91.96%
Roman Catholic	6,582	3.37%
Other Christian	3,267	1.67%
Hindu	2,905	1.49%
Islam	2,765	1.42%
Other	187	0.10%
Total	195,355	100.00%
Sinhalese	187,363	95.90
Sri Lankan Tamils	3,107	1.59
Sri Lankan Moors	1,369	0.70
Burghers	1,343	0.68
Sri Lankan Malays	1,143	0.58
Indian Tamils	529	0.27
Bharatha	471	0.24
Sri Lankan Chetty	82	0.04
Other	16	0.00
Total	195,355	100.00%

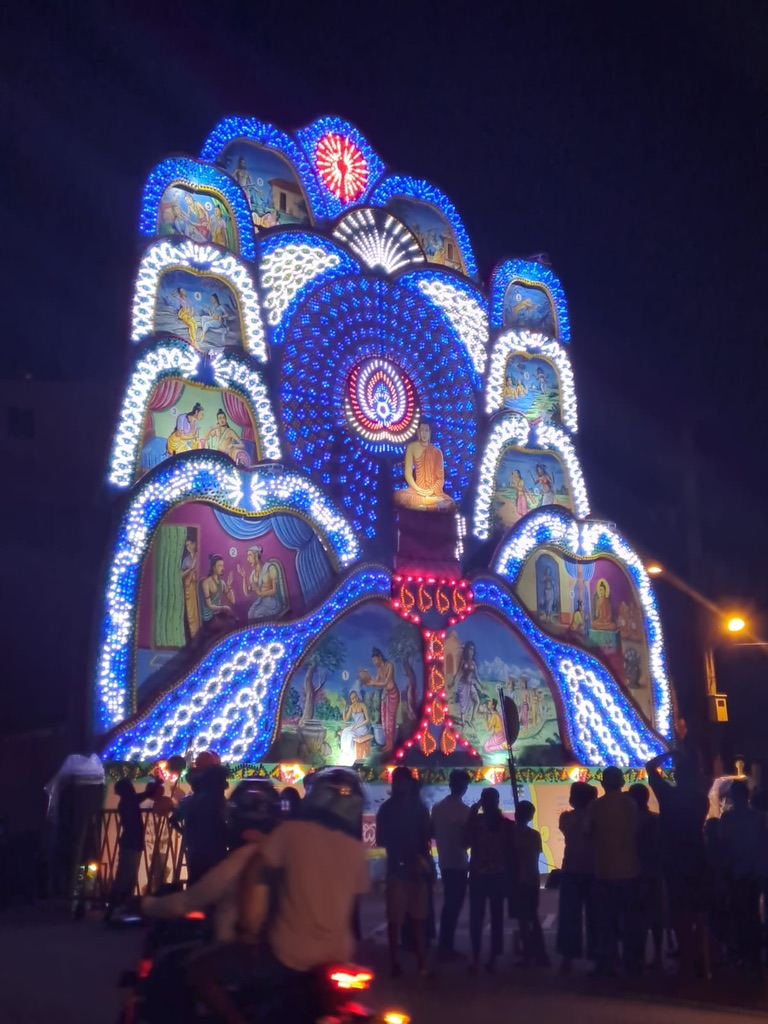
Maharagama Vesak Pandol 2023

== Vesak Pandol ==
The Maharagama trade union constructs a Vesak Pandol (a huge, temporarily electronically lit structure depicting the life of the Buddha) annually during the Vesak season. This attracts many people from around the country, and is one of the most recognized Pandols in all of Sri Lanka.

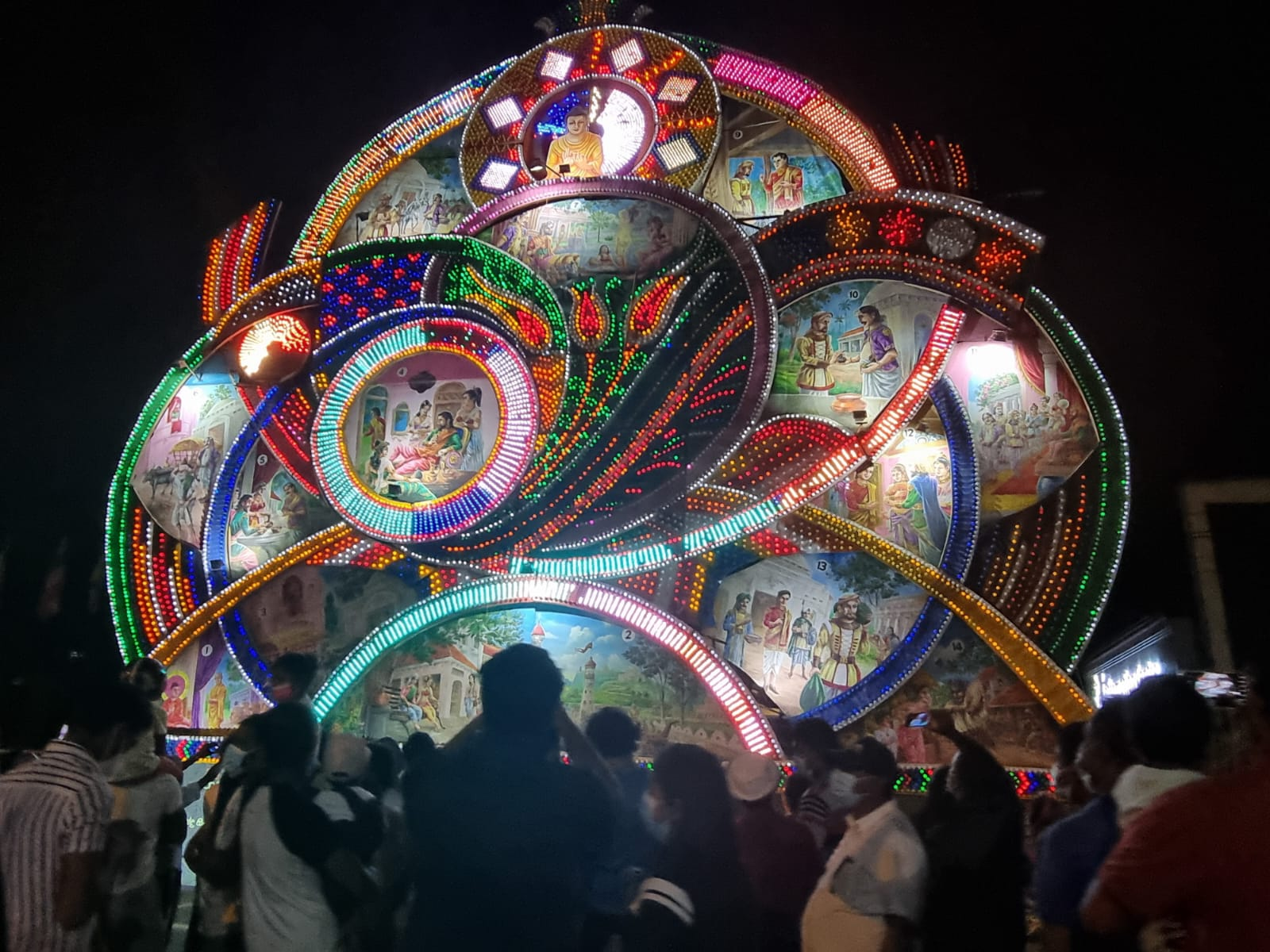
Maharagama Vesak Pandol 2022

== Important places around Maharagama ==
- National Youth Services Council
- National Institute of Education (NIE), Sri Lanka
- National Cancer Institute (NCI)/Apeksha Hospital
- Sri Vajiragnana Dharmayatanaya (Bhikkhu Training Center)
- National Teachers' Training College
- National Ayurvedic Hospital
- Boralesgamuwa Lake
- University of Sri Jayewardenepura
- National Dental Institute
- Sri Jawardenapura National Hospital
- Arpico Super Center, Navinna
- Ghafooriyya Arabic College, Maharagama

== Schools in Maharagama ==
- Buwanekaba Maha Vidyalaya
- Central College-Maharagama
- Dharmashoka Kanista Vidyalaya
- Ghafooriya Arabic College
- JMC International School
- President's College, Maharagama
- Royal Institute International School
- Vidyakara Balika Maha Vidyalaya
- Polymath International Collage

== Public transport ==
=== Railway ===
Trains starting from Colombo Fort stop at Maharagama Railway Station and nearby Nawinna Railway Station. The stations lie on the Kelani Valley Line, with local trains to Colombo Fort, Maradana, and Avissawella.

Maharagama Railway Station is in the Pamunuwa area.

Currently the Kelani Valley Line serves an increasingly urbanizing population between Colombo Fort and Maharagama. Though capacity increased through broad-gauging the line, services face limitations due to sharp curves and the illegal construction on the sides of the track between Colombo and Maharagama.

=== Bus routes ===
Maharagama, which is in the middle of few important areas, has bus routes that access to the suburb centre.

Bus routes heading via Maharagama to/from Colombo: (via High Level Rd, Nugegoda and Kirulapona)

- 138 - Kottawa / Homagama
- 138/2 - Mattegoda
- 138/3 - Rukmalgama
- 138/4 - Athurugiriya
- 138/5 - Mullegama
- 122 - Avissawella / Ratnapura
- 125 - Padukka / Ingiriya

Local bus routes terminating at Maharagama:

- 138 - Colombo (Pettah)
- 112 - Kotahena
- 119 - Dehiwala (via Boralesgamuwa and Bellanwila)
- 119 - Nugegoda
- 993 - Malabe
- 122/1 - Avissawella (by Sri Lanka Transport Board - SLTB)
- 123 - Athurugiriya
- 124 - Ihalabope
- 128/1 - Moonamalewaththa
- 125/1 - Ingiriya/Padukka
- 129 - Moragahahena (by SLTB)
- 192 - Moratuwa
- 280 - Horana
- 341 - Piliyandala
- 341/1 - Katuwawala
- 341/1/256 - Ratmalana (via Neelammahara / Borupana / Belek Kade Junction)
- 341/2 - Karadiyana (via Bokundara )
- 345 - Katuwawala (via Government Cancer Institute)
- 990 - Vidyala Junction (via Dambahena / Weera Mawatha)
- 990/1 - Dambahena
- 212 - Sri Jayewardenepura Hospital (Nawarohala)
- 991 - Sri Jayewardenepure Hospital (Nawarohala)
- 994 - Hokandara (via Polwatta)
- 996 - Katukurunda
- 212/341 - Bokundara (via Makuludoowa, Arawwala & Moraketiya)

Long-distance bus service via Maharagama to/from Colombo:

- 99 - Badulla / Welimada / Passara
- 122 - Ratnapura / Embilipitiya / Suriyawewa

Long-distance bus service terminating at Maharagama operated by the SLTB:

- 02 - Galle / Matara (Normal Service)
- EX 001 - Galle / Matara (Luxury Service via the Southern Expressway)
- 69/122 - Kandy
- 16/122 - Kandy
- 16/79 - Nuwara Eliya
- 16/48 - Polonnaruwa
- 16/48 - Batticaloa
- 16/57 - Anuradhapura
- 16/15 - Mullaitivu
- 02/16/15 - Mannar
- 02/16/57 - Jaffna
- 99 - Pambahinna - (Sabaragamuwa University of Sri Lanka)
