= President's College, Maharagama =

President's College Maharagama ජනාධිපති විද්‍යාලය මහරගම
- Maharagama; Sri Lanka

Information
- Type: National
- Motto: "වියත් දස දෙස පිදෙත්"; Viyath Dasa Desa Pideth (Erudite people are accepted people everywhere)
- Religious affiliation: Buddhist
- Established: February 18, 1978 School
- Principal: Sir Wasantha Kumara
- Grades: 1–13
- Gender: Boys
- Age range: 6 to 19
- Enrollment: 4200
- Colors: Green and orange
- Website: Official website

President's College Maharagama established on 18 February 1978 in Maharagama in Colombo district Sri Lanka as a National School. The school belongs to Maharagama division of Sri Jayawardhanapura educational zone, Western Province, Sri Lanka. President's College is a largest government boys school.

== Overview ==
President's College, situated in Maharagama, is one of the leading boys schools which aimed at educational skills and endeavor to produce inspired, disciplined, creative, patriotic and a worthy generation to the country by offering the government education system. Academics at school is divided into four sections, namely the primary section (grades 1–5), the middle school (grades 6–9), the upper middle school (grades 10 & 11) and the upper school (grades 12 & 13). All grades have classes that offer syllabuses in Sinhala and English mediums. Currently over 15 student clubs, theater spaces state of the art sports facilities, and a computer lab are available. Special extra-curricular activities are available such as scouting, cadetting, cadet band, broadcasting unit, and road traffic controlling unit. The Rapiyal Thennakoon vidyalaya of Gangodawila, Nugegoda is now being affiliated as a primary model school to the President's College.

== History ==
According to the proposal of Hon. Premarathne Gunasekara (former member of Parliament in Maharagama) as a remedial solution for congested school in area, It was commenced as a mixed school with a combination of 600 students and 16 teachers of Vidyakara Vidyalaya, Maharagama. On 18 February 1978 with the endowment of hostel buildings of the Teachers Training College, Maharagama. Mr. J.S.V.S. Soysa, was the first Principal (July 11, 1978 - October 4, 1990) of the college and the then became Zonal Director of education. Before appoint him as Principal, he was at Ananda College, Colombo. Mr. J.S.V.S. Soysa laid a strong foundation to this college and his yeoman and efficient services of 12 years contributed immensely in upgrading this college to its present state. According to the history records, the students were accommodated in dilapidated buildings which had been used as the hostels of Maharagama Training College. Earlier it had been used as Army Barracks and even before that as a rubber factory. At the very beginning it had been a property belonged to one Abeywardana family. In 1994 Presidents college declared as a boys school and currently it is a pioneer boys school in the area.

== Houses ==
Flag of President's College

The students are divided among four houses:

- 1.Gemunu
- Vijaya
- Perakum
- Tissa

== School anthem ==
The school song is "Siridula Sinhala Deepe", which is sung at the start of the school day and on important occasions. The words of song were composed by Mr. Doltan Alwis and music by Pandith W. D. Amaradeva.

== Past Pupils' Association ==
Formation of Past Pupils Association (PPA) is for primary expectation to increase the sense of fellowship in past students both with one another and with the college and support the schools development in a variety of ways. The PPA is playing a key role in development of school.

== Principals ==
- J.S.V.S. De Soysa (July 11, 1978 –October 4, 1990)
- W.S. Ranasinghe (October 4, 1990 –July 9, 1994)
- R. A Premarathna (July 9, 1994 –February 10, 1997)
- S Rajapaksha (February 10, 1997 –August 25, 1999)
- K. A. D. Punnyadasa (August 25, 1999 –January 3, 2004)
- J.W. S. Siriwardana (January 3, 2004 –July 31, 2009)
- W.J.R. Wimalasena (August 1, 2009 –November 11, 2011)
- Captain: W. Wasantha Kumara (November 9, 2011 – December 31, 2022)
