= Maharagama Divisional Secretariat =

Maharagama Divisional Secretariat: මහරගම ප්‍රාදේශීය ලේකම් කාර්යාලය (Sinhala); மகாரகம பிரதேச செயலகம் (Tamil)
- Divisional Secretariat
- Country: Sri Lanka
- Province: Western Province
- District: Colombo District

Area
  - Total: 37.78 km^{2} (14.59 sq mi)

Population (2024 census)
  - Total: 196,500
- Time zone: UTC+5:30 (Sri Lanka Standard Time)
- Website: http://maharagama.ds.gov.lk

Maharagama Divisional Secretariat is a Divisional Secretariat of Colombo District, of Western Province, Sri Lanka.

== History ==
The current administrative complex was opened by President Mahinda Rajapaksa in 2010.

== Demography ==
Religion in Maharagama DS Division (2024)
1. Buddhist (93.2%)
2. Hindu (1.70%)
3. Muslim (1.30%)
4. Roman Catholic (2.70%)
5. Other Christian (1.10%)
6. Other (0.00%)

== Divisions ==
The Divisional Secretariat consists of 41 Grama Niladhari Divisions.

1. Kalalgoda
2. Thalawathugoda West
3. Thalawathugoda East
4. Kottawa South
5. Kottawa East
6. Kottawa City
7. Kottawa North
8. Kottawa West
9. Liyanagoda
10. Rukmale West
11. Rukmale East (497A)
12. Rukmale East (497B)
13. Malapalla East
14. Makumbura North
15. Malapalla West
16. Makumbura South
17. Mirihana North
18. Mirihana South
19. Madiwela
20. Pragathipura
21. Thalapathpitiya
22. Udahamulla East
23. Udahamulla West
24. Gangodawila South
25. Wijerama
26. Jambugasmulla
27. Nawinna
28. Pathiragoda
29. Maharagama East
30. Maharagama West
31. Pamunuwa
32. Dambahena
33. Polwaththa
34. Depanama
35. Maharagama City
36. Pannipitiya North
37. Pannipitiya South
38. Godigamuwa North
39. Godigamuwa South (532A)
40. Godigamuwa South (532B)
41. Waththegedara

== Land Usage ==
The Maharagama Divisional Secretariat has 3,813 hectares (9,420 acres) of land:

Land Consumption
1. Developed Land (46.4%)
2. Home Gardens (36.6%)
3. Paddy (13.4%)
4. Marsh (1.21%)
5. Other (2.44%)

Land Consumption		Area (Hectare)	% of Total
Developed Land (built up/residential/industrial)		1,769	46.39
Agricultural Lands	Home gardens	1,395	36.58
Agricultural Lands	Rubber	14	0.35
Agricultural Lands	Coconut	6	0.15
Agricultural Lands	Paddy	510	13.38
Marsh		46	1.21
Water resources		24	0.63
Other land (rocky/barren/sandy)		49	1.28
Total land area		3,813	100.00
