= Maharagama Polling Division =

Maharagama
- Polling Division
- Coordinates: 6.854785°N 79.938434°E
- Country: Sri Lanka
- Province: Western Province, Sri Lanka
- Electoral District: Colombo Electoral District

Area
  - Total: 37.89 km^{2} (14.63 sq mi)

Population (2012)
  - Total: 196,423
  - Density: 5,184/km^{2} (13,430/sq mi)
- ISO 3166 code: EC-01M

The Maharagama Polling Division is a Polling Division in the Colombo Electoral District, in the Western Province, Sri Lanka.

== Presidential Election Results ==
=== Summary ===
The winner of Maharagama has matched the final country result 6 out of 8 times. Hence, Maharagama is a Weak Bellwether for Presidential Elections.

Year	Maharagama	Colombo Electoral District	MAE %	Sri Lanka	MAE %
2019	SLPP	SLPP	12.32%	SLPP	13.30%
2015	UPFA	NDF	7.09%	NDF	2.69%
2010	UPFA	UPFA	9.09%	UPFA	3.87%
2005	UPFA	UNP	11.20%	UPFA	8.69%
1999	PA	PA	7.47%	PA	5.93%
1994	PA	PA	4.93%	PA	7.35%
1988	SLFP	UNP	10.71%	UNP	11.93%
1982	UNP	UNP	7.59%	UNP	3.78%
Matches/Mean MAE	6/8	7/8	8.80%	8/8	7.19%

=== 2019 Sri Lankan Presidential Election ===
Party	Maharagama		Colombo Electoral District		Sri Lanka	
Party	Votes	%	Votes	%	Votes	%
SLPP	71,893	65.60%	727,713	53.19%	6,924,255	52.25%
NDF	29,688	27.09%	559,921	40.92%	5,564,239	41.99%
NMPP	5,820	5.31%	53,803	3.93%	418,553	3.16%
NPP	1,165	1.06%	10,335	0.76%	49,655	0.37%
Other Parties (with < 1%)	1,035	0.94%	16,405	1.20%	295,797	2.23%
Valid Votes	109,601	98.98%	1,368,177	98.89%	13,252,499	98.99%
Rejected Votes	1,129	1.02%	15,333	1.11%	135,452	1.01%
Total Polled	110,730	82.87%	1,383,510	82.82%	13,387,951	83.71%
Registered Electors	133,614		1,670,403		15,992,568	

=== 2015 Sri Lankan Presidential Election ===
Party	Maharagama		Colombo Electoral District		Sri Lanka	
Party	Votes	%	Votes	%	Votes	%
UPFA	53,327	50.62%	562,614	43.40%	5,768,090	47.58%
NDF	51,480	48.86%	725,073	55.93%	6,217,162	51.28%
Other Parties (with < 1%)	546	0.52%	8,673	0.67%	138,200	1.14%
Valid Votes	105,353	98.86%	1,296,360	98.83%	12,123,452	98.85%
Rejected Votes	1,220	1.14%	15,334	1.17%	140,925	1.15%
Total Polled	106,573	82.10%	1,311,694	81.34%	12,264,377	78.69%
Registered Electors	129,801		1,612,660		15,585,942	

=== 2010 Sri Lankan Presidential Election ===
Party	Maharagama		Colombo Electoral District		Sri Lanka	
Party	Votes	%	Votes	%	Votes	%
UPFA	59,360	62.32%	614,740	52.93%	6,015,934	57.88%
NDF	35,162	36.91%	533,022	45.90%	4,173,185	40.15%
Other Parties (with < 1%)	733	0.77%	13,620	1.17%	204,494	1.97%
Valid Votes	95,255	99.20%	1,161,382	99.03%	10,393,613	99.03%
Rejected Votes	768	0.80%	11,394	0.97%	101,838	0.97%
Total Polled	96,023	79.20%	1,172,776	76.09%	10,495,451	66.70%
Registered Electors	121,247		1,541,242		15,734,587	

=== 2005 Sri Lankan Presidential Election ===
Party	Maharagama		Colombo Electoral District		Sri Lanka	
Party	Votes	%	Votes	%	Votes	%
UPFA	53,681	59.37%	534,431	47.96%	4,887,152	50.29%
UNP	36,093	39.91%	569,627	51.12%	4,706,366	48.43%
Other Parties (with < 1%)	651	0.72%	10,192	0.91%	123,521	1.27%
Valid Votes	90,425	99.00%	1,114,250	98.86%	9,717,039	98.88%
Rejected Votes	910	1.00%	12,879	1.14%	109,869	1.12%
Total Polled	91,335	76.66%	1,127,129	75.85%	9,826,908	69.51%
Registered Electors	119,137		1,486,021		14,136,979	

=== 1999 Sri Lankan Presidential Election ===
Party	Maharagama		Colombo Electoral District		Sri Lanka	
Party	Votes	%	Votes	%	Votes	%
PA	43,584	56.54%	474,310	49.18%	4,312,157	51.12%
UNP	27,338	35.47%	425,185	44.08%	3,602,748	42.71%
JVP	4,168	5.41%	44,009	4.56%	343,927	4.08%
SMBP	1,119	1.45%	8,209	0.85%	35,854	0.43%
Other Parties (with < 1%)	872	1.13%	12,821	1.33%	140,825	1.67%
Valid Votes	77,081	96.40%	964,534	97.06%	8,435,754	97.69%
Rejected Votes	2,876	3.60%	29,197	2.94%	199,536	2.31%
Total Polled	79,957	73.61%	993,731	73.39%	8,635,290	72.17%
Registered Electors	108,622		1,354,025		11,965,536	

=== 1994 Sri Lankan Presidential Election ===
Party	Maharagama		Colombo Electoral District		Sri Lanka	
Party	Votes	%	Votes	%	Votes	%
PA	47,818	69.79%	557,708	64.82%	4,709,205	62.28%
UNP	19,514	28.48%	288,741	33.56%	2,715,283	35.91%
Other Parties (with < 1%)	1,189	1.74%	13,937	1.62%	137,040	1.81%
Valid Votes	68,521	98.10%	860,386	98.17%	7,561,526	98.03%
Rejected Votes	1,328	1.90%	16,060	1.83%	151,706	1.97%
Total Polled	69,849	68.94%	876,446	69.59%	7,713,232	69.12%
Registered Electors	101,317		1,259,484		11,158,880	

=== 1988 Sri Lankan Presidential Election ===
Party	Maharagama		Colombo Electoral District		Sri Lanka	
Party	Votes	%	Votes	%	Votes	%
SLFP	31,396	57.69%	339,958	46.23%	2,289,857	44.95%
UNP	20,770	38.16%	361,337	49.14%	2,569,199	50.43%
SLMP	2,260	4.15%	34,020	4.63%	235,701	4.63%
Valid Votes	54,426	98.59%	735,315	98.49%	5,094,754	98.24%
Rejected Votes	779	1.41%	11,295	1.51%	91,499	1.76%
Total Polled	55,205	66.04%	746,610	67.53%	5,186,256	55.87%
Registered Electors	83,598		1,105,583		9,283,143	

=== 1982 Sri Lankan Presidential Election ===
Party	Maharagama		Colombo Electoral District		Sri Lanka	
Party	Votes	%	Votes	%	Votes	%
UNP	26,967	49.46%	436,290	57.86%	3,450,815	52.93%
SLFP	23,874	43.79%	274,476	36.40%	2,546,348	39.05%
JVP	2,595	4.76%	28,580	3.79%	273,428	4.19%
LSSP	946	1.73%	9,655	1.28%	58,531	0.90%
Other Parties (with < 1%)	143	0.26%	5,030	0.67%	190,929	2.93%
Valid Votes	54,525	98.92%	754,031	98.95%	6,520,156	98.78%
Rejected Votes	593	1.08%	7,990	1.05%	80,470	1.22%
Total Polled	55,118	76.98%	762,021	76.88%	6,600,626	80.15%
Registered Electors	71,597		991,194		8,235,358	

== Parliamentary Election Results ==
=== Summary ===
The winner of Maharagama has matched the final country result 6 out of 7 times.

Year	Maharagama	Colombo Electoral District	MAE %	Sri Lanka	MAE %
2015	UPFA	UNP	9.36%	UNP	4.18%
2010	UPFA	UPFA	8.21%	UPFA	3.13%
2004	UPFA	UNP	10.54%	UPFA	6.68%
2001	UNP	UNP	6.99%	UNP	2.73%
2000	PA	UNP	6.37%	PA	2.26%
1994	PA	PA	5.58%	PA	7.51%
1989	UNP	UNP	11.02%	UNP	9.76%
Matches/Mean MAE	6/7	5/7	8.30%	7/7	5.18%

=== 2020 Sri Lankan Parliamentary Election ===
Party	Maharagama		Colombo Electoral District		Sri Lanka	
Party	Votes	%	Votes	%	Votes	%
SLPFA	64,309	68.91%	674,603	57.04%	6,853,693	59.09%
SJB	17,733	19%	387,145	32.73%	2,771,984	23.9%
JJB	7,371	7.9%	67,600	5.72%	445,958	3.84%
UNP	2,128	2.28%	30,875	2.61%	249,435	2.15%
Other Parties (with < 1%)	1,776	1.92%	22,553	1.9%	1,227,859	11.02%
Valid Votes	93,317	68.46%	1,182,776	69.2%	11,598,936	71.32%
Rejected Votes	4,931	3.62%	81,034	4.74%	744,373	4.58%
Total Polled	98,248	72.08%	1,263,810	73.94%	12,343,309	75.89%
Registered Electors	136,304		1,709,209		16,263,885	

=== 2015 Sri Lankan Parliamentary Election ===
Party	Maharagama		Colombo Electoral District		Sri Lanka	
Party	Votes	%	Votes	%	Votes	%
UPFA	47,049	47.77%	474,063	39.25%	4,732,664	42.48%
UNP	41,374	42.01%	640,743	53.04%	5,098,916	45.77%
JVP	9,001	9.14%	81,391	6.74%	544,154	4.88%
Other Parties (with < 1%)	1,059	1.08%	11,752	0.97%	93,045	0.84%
Valid Votes	98,483	97.47%	1,207,949	96.46%	11,140,333	95.35%
Rejected Votes	2,492	2.47%	43,372	3.46%	516,926	4.42%
Total Polled	101,040	77.84%	1,252,271	78.93%	11,684,111	77.66%
Registered Electors	129,801		1,586,598		15,044,490	

=== 2010 Sri Lankan Parliamentary Election ===
Party	Maharagama		Colombo Electoral District		Sri Lanka	
Party	Votes	%	Votes	%	Votes	%
UPFA	44,200	58.31%	480,896	51.23%	4,846,388	60.38%
UNP	18,937	24.98%	339,750	36.19%	2,357,057	29.37%
DNA	12,313	16.24%	110,683	11.79%	441,251	5.50%
Other Parties (with < 1%)	354	0.47%	7,292	0.78%	48,240	0.60%
Valid Votes	75,804	96.12%	938,723	94.85%	8,026,322	96.03%
Rejected Votes	3,014	3.82%	50,354	5.09%	581,465	6.96%
Total Polled	78,861	65.04%	989,729	64.17%	8,358,246	59.29%
Registered Electors	121,247		1,542,457		14,097,690	

=== 2004 Sri Lankan Parliamentary Election ===
Party	Maharagama		Colombo Electoral District		Sri Lanka	
Party	Votes	%	Votes	%	Votes	%
UPFA	37,919	43.93%	414,688	39.20%	4,223,126	45.70%
JHU	25,385	29.41%	190,618	18.02%	552,723	5.98%
UNP	22,337	25.88%	441,841	41.77%	3,486,792	37.73%
Other Parties (with < 1%)	680	0.79%	10,713	1.01%	90,868	0.98%
Valid Votes	86,321	97.55%	1,057,860	96.47%	9,241,931	94.52%
Rejected Votes	2,161	2.44%	38,605	3.52%	534,452	5.47%
Total Polled	88,488	74.79%	1,096,571	74.71%	9,777,821	75.74%
Registered Electors	118,318		1,467,751		12,909,631	

=== 2001 Sri Lankan Parliamentary Election ===
Party	Maharagama		Colombo Electoral District		Sri Lanka	
Party	Votes	%	Votes	%	Votes	%
UNP	35,932	42.52%	546,417	51.62%	4,086,026	45.62%
PA	32,800	38.82%	353,401	33.39%	3,330,815	37.19%
JVP	12,776	15.12%	117,404	11.09%	815,353	9.10%
SU	2,106	2.49%	16,970	1.60%	50,665	0.57%
Other Parties (with < 1%)	886	1.05%	24,289	2.29%	510,616	5.70%
Valid Votes	84,500	97.01%	1,058,481	96.28%	8,955,844	94.77%
Rejected Votes	2,608	2.99%	40,901	3.72%	494,009	5.23%
Total Polled	87,108	75.84%	1,099,382	76.31%	9,449,878	76.03%
Registered Electors	114,854		1,440,682		12,428,762	

=== 2000 Sri Lankan Parliamentary Election ===
Party	Maharagama		Colombo Electoral District		Sri Lanka	
Party	Votes	%	Votes	%	Votes	%
PA	36,995	45.38%	394,146	38.86%	3,899,329	45.33%
UNP	28,952	35.52%	440,684	43.45%	3,451,765	40.12%
JVP	8,174	10.03%	78,133	7.70%	518,725	6.03%
SU	6,302	7.73%	49,671	4.90%	127,859	1.49%
Other Parties (with < 1%)	1,095	1.34%	51,586	5.09%	375,083	4.36%
Valid Votes	81,518	N/A	1,014,220	N/A	8,602,617	N/A

=== 1994 Sri Lankan Parliamentary Election ===
Party	Maharagama		Colombo Electoral District		Sri Lanka	
Party	Votes	%	Votes	%	Votes	%
PA	41,034	54.93%	469,642	50.94%	3,887,805	48.94%
UNP	25,269	33.83%	385,100	41.77%	3,498,370	44.04%
MEP	6,932	9.28%	42,734	4.64%	68,538	0.86%
SLPF	1,142	1.53%	11,454	1.24%	90,078	1.13%
Other Parties (with < 1%)	321	0.43%	13,003	1.41%	51,995	0.65%
Valid Votes	74,698	97.29%	921,933	96.18%	7,943,688	95.20%
Rejected Votes	2,082	2.71%	36,635	3.82%	400,395	4.80%
Total Polled	76,780	75.78%	958,568	76.04%	8,344,095	74.75%
Registered Electors	101,317		1,260,686		11,163,064	

=== 1989 Sri Lankan Parliamentary Election ===
Party	Maharagama		Colombo Electoral District		Sri Lanka	
Party	Votes	%	Votes	%	Votes	%
UNP	22,042	40.24%	374,530	51.67%	2,838,005	50.71%
MEP	19,152	34.96%	76,966	10.62%	90,480	1.62%
SLFP	11,002	20.08%	205,053	28.29%	1,785,369	31.90%
USA	1,758	3.21%	31,873	4.40%	141,983	2.54%
ELJP	671	1.22%	7,112	0.98%	67,723	1.21%
Other Parties (with < 1%)	158	0.29%	29,308	4.04%	202,016	3.61%
Valid Votes	54,783	96.24%	724,842	95.36%	5,596,468	93.87%
Rejected Votes	2,138	3.76%	35,271	4.64%	365,563	6.13%
Total Polled	56,921	69.61%	760,113	69.87%	5,962,031	63.60%
Registered Electors	81,774		1,087,891		9,374,164	

== Demographics ==
=== Ethnicity ===
The Maharagama Polling Division has a Sinhalese majority (95.7%) . In comparison, the Colombo Electoral District (which contains the Maharagama Polling Division) has a Sinhalese majority (76.5%), a significant Moor population (10.7%) and a significant Sri Lankan Tamil population (10.1%)

Ethnicity in Maharagama
1. Sinhalese (95.7%)
2. Other (2.60%)
3. Sri Lankan Tamil (1.70%)

=== Religion ===
The Maharagama Polling Division has a Buddhist majority (92.0%) . In comparison, the Colombo Electoral District (which contains the Maharagama Polling Division) has a Buddhist majority (70.2%) and a significant Muslim population (11.8%)

Religion in Maharagama
1. Buddhist (92.0%)
2. Roman Catholic (3.40%)
3. Other Christian (1.70%)
4. Hindu (1.50%)
5. Muslim (1.40%)
6. Other (0.10%)
