= Africans in Sri Lanka =

African Sri Lankans
Total population
- Few thousand (2005); ~10,000 (2009)

Regions with significant populations
- Sri Lanka: ~10,000
- Negombo
- Trincomalee
- Batticaloa

Languages
- Sri Lanka Kaffir language, Sinhala, Tamil language, Sri Lankan Portuguese Creole, Mauritian Creole, French, Italian, Swahili, Igbo, Yoruba, Telugu, Gujarati

Religion
- Originally Sunni Islam; Roman Catholicism and Buddhism

Related ethnic groups
- other Afro-Asians

African Sri Lankans, mainly the Sri Lanka Kaffirs, are a very small Ethnic group in Sri Lanka who are descendants of African mercenaries, musicians, and labourers taken to what is now Sri Lanka by Portuguese colonists during the period of Portuguese colonial rule on the island. There are currently around 1,000 African Sri Lankans. They live in pockets of communities along the island's coastal regions of Trincomalee, Batticaloa, and Negombo. The Portuguese colonists used them to fight the Ceylonese Kings.

The main African Sri Lankans are known as Kaffirs. This term is not used as a racial pejorative as in other parts of the world. Some were originally Muslims, while others practiced African religions, but many have now converted to Catholicism and Buddhism. They speak a lyrical creole language with a mix of native Sinhalese and Tamil.

== Groups ==
=== Sri Lanka Kaffirs ===
The Sri Lankan Kaffirs are an ethnic group in Sri Lanka who are partially descended from 16th century Portuguese traders and the Africans who were brought by them to work as labourers and soldiers to fight against the Sri Lankan kings.

== See also ==
- Siddi
