= Demographics of Sri Lanka =

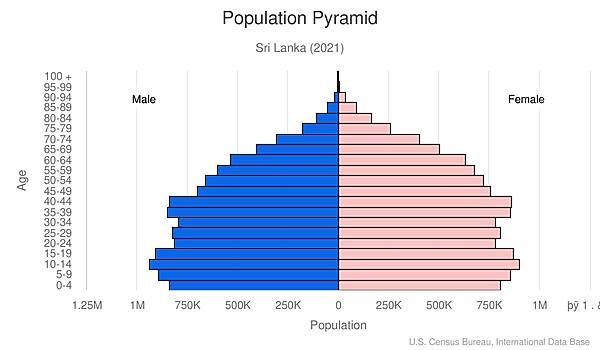
- Sri Lanka population pyramid in 2021.
- Population: 21,763,170 (2024 Census)
- Density: 332/km^{2} (2018)
- Growth rate: 0.61% (2022)
- Birth rate: 11.2 births/1,000 population (2023 est.)
- Death rate: 8.2 deaths/1,000 population (2023 est.)
- Life expectancy: 75.94 years (2012 est.)
  - male: 72.43 years (2012 est.)
  - female: 79.59 years (2012 est.)
- Fertility rate: 1.3 children born/woman (2024 Census)
- Infant mortality: 5.88 deaths/1,000 live births (2024 est.)

Age structure
- 0–14 years: ▼21.7% (2025 est.)
- 15–64 years: ▼65.8% (2025 est.)
- 65 and over: ▲12.5% (2025 est.)

Sex ratio
- Total: 0.93 male(s)/female (2018)
- At birth: 1.02 male(s)/female (2018)
- Under 15: 1.02 male(s)/female (2018)
- 15–64 years: 0.93 male(s)/female (2018)
- 65 and over: 0.76 male(s)/female (2018)

Nationality
- Nationality: noun: Sri Lankan(s) adjective: Sri Lankan
- Major ethnic: Sinhalese (74.1%) (2024 census)
- Minor ethnic: Sri Lankan Tamil (12.3%) (2024 census); Moor (10.5%) (2024 census); Indian Tamil (2.8%) (2024 census)

Language
- Official: Sinhalese, Tamil
- Spoken: English

Historical population of Sri Lanka

Sri Lanka is an island in the Indian Ocean, formerly known as Ceylon and also by many other names. It is about the size of Ireland. It is about 28 kilometres (18 mi.) off the south-eastern coast of India with a population of about 22 million. The population density is highest in the south-west where Colombo, the country's main port and industrial center, is located. The net population growth is about 0.7%. Sri Lanka is ethnically, linguistically, and religiously diverse.

== Overview ==
Population of Sri Lanka
Year	Pop.	±% p.a.
1800	1,200,000	—
1871	2,400,380	+0.98%
1881	2,759,738	+1.40%
1891	3,007,789	+0.86%
1901	3,565,954	+1.72%
1911	4,106,350	+1.42%
1921	4,498,605	+0.92%
1931	5,306,871	+1.67%
1946	6,657,339	+1.52%
1953	8,097,895	+2.84%
1963	10,582,064	+2.71%
1971	12,689,897	+2.30%
1981	14,846,750	+1.58%
1990	17,325,773	+1.73%
2000	18,777,601	+0.81%
2012	20,359,439	+0.68%
2024	21,763,170	+0.56%

According to the 2012 census the population of Sri Lanka was 20,359,439, giving a population density of 325/km^{2}. The population had grown by 5,512,689 (37.1%) since the 1981 census (the last full census), equivalent to an annual growth rate of 1.1%. 3,704,470 (18.2%) lived in urban sectors – areas governed by municipal and urban councils.

5,131,666 (25.2%) of the population were aged 14 or under whilst 2,525,573 (12.4%) were aged 60 or over, leaving a working age (15–59) population of 12,702,700. The dependency ratio was 60.2%. The mean age was 32 years and the median age was 31 years. The sex ratio was 94 males per 100 females. The fertility rate for married females aged 15 or over was 2.65 live births. There were 5,264,282 households, of which 3,986,236 (75.7%) were headed by males and 1,278,046 (24.3%) were headed by females.

Of the 15,227,773 aged 15 or over, 10,322,105 (67.8%) were married, 3,927,602 (25.8%) were never married, 792,947 (5.2%) were widowed and 185,119 (1.2%) were divorced or separated.

Of those aged 15 or over, 7,857,370 (51.6%) were economically active, 4,199,558 (27.6%) did housework, 1,431,105 (9.4%) were students, 914,934 (6.0%) were unable to work and 346,084 (2.3%) were pensioners. 521,938 (6.6%) of the economically active were unemployed. 604,540 Sri Lankans were living aboard for more than six months but were intending to return to Sri Lanka, mostly in the Gulf states (373,050 61.7%).

The overall literacy rate for those aged 10 and over was 95.7% but amongst those living in the estate sector it was only 86.1%. Of the 18,615,577 aged 5 or over, 499,563 (2.7%) had received a higher education qualification, 2,293,841 (12.3%) had passed G.C.E. A/L, 3,159,402 (17.0%) had passed G.C.E. O/L and 700,419 (3.8%) had no formal schooling. The remaining 11,962,352 (64.3%) had left school with no qualifications or were currently at school.

Sri Lanka's population is aging faster than any other nation in South Asia and has the fifth highest rapidly growing population of older people in Asia after China, Thailand, South Korea and Japan. In 2015, Sri Lanka's population aged over 60 was 13.9%, by 2030 this will increase to 21% and by 2050 this number will reach 27.4%. Sri Lanka's rapidly growing older population has ignited concerns of the socio-economic challenges that the country will face because of this.

=== Age groups ===
Population by Sex and Age Group (Census 20.III.2012):

Age group	Male	Female	Total	%
Total	9 856 634	10 502 805	20 359 439	100
0–4	879 223	864 639	1 743 862	8.57
5–9	882 108	865 644	1 747 752	8.58
10–14	829 069	810 983	1 640 052	8.06
15–19	819 927	824 322	1 644 249	8.08
20–24	742 316	790 567	1 532 883	7.53
25–29	743 510	809 338	1 552 848	7.63
30–34	796 866	842 549	1 639 415	8.05
35–39	686 037	723 040	1 409 077	6.92
40–44	661 623	697 586	1 359 209	6.68
45–49	618 140	667 690	1 285 830	6.32
50–54	581 293	638 167	1 219 460	5.99
55–59	500 871	563 358	1 064 229	5.23
60–64	425 428	492 482	917 910	4.51
65–69	283 764	349 525	633 289	3.11
70–74	181 846	230 568	412 414	2.03
75–79	116 389	166 797	283 186	1.39
80–84	64 250	95 129	159 379	0.78
85–89	28 293	45 148	73 441	0.36
90–94	9 293	14 965	24 258	0.12
95+	6 388	10 308	16 696	0.08
Age group	Male	Female	Total	Percent
0–14	2 590 400	2 541 266	5 131 666	25.21
15–64	6 576 011	7 049 099	13 625 110	66.92
65+	690 223	912 440	1 602 663	7.87

== Vital statistics ==
=== UN estimates ===
Period	Live births per year	Deaths per year	Natural change per year	CBR^{1}	CDR^{1}	NC^{1}	TFR^{1}	IMR^{1}
1950–1955	322,000	171,000	151,000	37.4	19.8	17.5	5.80	103.9
1955–1960	367,000	143,000	223,000	38.6	15.1	23.5	5.80	86.7
1960–1965	377,000	128,000	248,000	35.5	12.1	23.4	5.20	77.5
1965–1970	391,000	116,000	276,000	32.9	9.7	23.2	4.70	69.3
1970–1975	383,000	103,000	280,000	29.1	7.8	21.3	4.00	55.4
1975–1980	401,000	99,000	302,000	27.8	6.9	20.9	3.61	38.8
1980–1985	401,000	96,000	305,000	25.6	6.1	19.5	3.19	30.3
1985–1990	362,000	110,000	253,000	21.6	6.5	15.1	2.64	24.1
1990–1995	349,000	119,000	230,000	19.6	6.7	12.9	2.39	22.1
1995–2000	329,000	146,000	183,000	17.8	7.9	9.9	2.16	18.9
2000–2005	360,000	121,000	239,000	18.7	6.3	12.4	2.27	15.9
2005–2010	386,000	132,000	253,000	19.0	6.5	12.5	2.36	12.4
2010–2015				16.4	6.6	9.8	2.11	
2015–2020				14.9	7.1	7.8	2.03	
^{1} CBR = crude birth rate (per 1000); CDR = crude death rate (per 1000); NC = natural change (per 1000); TFR = total fertility rate (number of children per woman); IMR = infant mortality rate per 1000 births

=== Registered births and deaths ===
Year	Population	Live births	Deaths	Natural change	Crude birth rate (per 1000)	Crude death rate (per 1000)	Natural change (per 1000)	Crude migration change (per 1000)	Total Fertility Rate
1948		287,695	93,711	193,984	39.7	13.0	26.7		
1949		291,191	91,889	199,302	39.1	12.4	26.7		
1950		304,635	95,142	209,493	39.7	12.6	27.1		
1951		313,662	100,072	213,590	39.8	12.9	26.9		
1952		313,532	95,298	218,234	38.8	12.0	26.8		
1953		321,217	89,003	232,214	38.7	10.9	27.8		
1954		303,894	86,794	217,100	35.7	10.4	25.3		
1955		325,538	94,368	231,170	37.3	11.0	26.3		
1956		325,067	87,561	237,506	36.4	9.8	26.6		
1957		334,135	92,759	241,376	36.5	10.1	26.4		
1958		335,690	90,815	244,875	35.8	9.7	26.1		
1959		356,336	87,971	268,365	37.0	9.1	27.9		
1960		361,702	84,918	276,784	36.6	8.6	28.0		
1961		363,677	81,653	282,024	35.8	8.0	27.8		
1962		370,762	88,928	281,834	35.5	8.5	27.0		
1963		365,842	91,673	274,169	34.1	8.5	25.6		
1964		361,577	95,618	265,959	33.2	8.8	24.4		
1965		369,437	91,728	277,709	33.1	8.8	24.3		
1966		369,153	94,419	274,734	32.3	8.3	24.0		
1967		369,531	87,877	281,654	31.9	7.5	24.4		
1968		384,178	94,903	289,275	32.0	7.9	24.1		
1969		372,774	102,356	270,418	30.4	8.1	22.3		
1970		367,901	94,129	273,772	29.4	7.5	21.9		
1971		382,668	96,328	286,340	30.4	7.7	22.7		
1972		385,462	100,080	285,382	30.0	8.1	21.9		
1973		367,158	100,678	266,480	28.0	7.7	20.3		
1974		365,902	119,518	246,384	27.5	9.0	18.5		
1975		374,689	115,108	259,581	27.8	8.5	19.3		
1976		380,702	106,506	274,196	27.8	7.8	20.0		
1977		389,522	103,284	286,238	27.9	7.4	20.5		
1978		404,831	93,971	310,860	28.5	6.6	21.9		
1979		417,986	94,244	323,742	28.9	6.5	22.4		
1980		418,373	91,020	327,353	28.4	6.2	22.2		
1981		423,973	88,481	335,492	28.2	5.9	22.3		
1982		408,895	92,244	316,651	26.9	6.1	20.8		
1983		405,122	95,174	309,948	26.3	6.2	20.1		
1984		391,064	100,725	290,339	25.1	6.5	18.6		
1985		389,599	98,089	291,510	24.6	6.2	18.4		
1986		361,735	96,145	265,590	22.4	6.0	16.4		
1987		357,723	97,756	259,967	21.8	6.0	15.8		
1988		344,179	95,934	248,245	20.7	5.8	14.9		
1989		363,343	105,239	258,104	21.6	6.3	15.3		
1990		341,223	97,713	243,510	20.8	6.0	14.8		
1991		356,593	95,574	261,019	21.7	5.8	15.9		
1992		356,842	98,380	258,462	21.5	5.9	15.6		
1993		350,707	96,179	254,528	20.8	5.7	15.1		
1994		356,071	100,394	255,677	20.8	5.9	14.9		
1995		343,224	104,707	238,517	19.9	6.0	13.9		
1996		340,649	122,161	218,488	19.5	7.0	12.5		
1997		333,219	114,591	218,628	18.8	6.4	12.4		
1998		322,672	112,653	210,019	18.2	6.2	12.0		
1999		328,725	115,330	213,395	18.1	6.3	11.8		
2000		347,749	116,200	231,549	18.4	6.1	12.3		
2001		358,583	112,858	245,725	18.9	5.9	13.0		
2002		367,709	111,863	255,846	19.1	5.8	13.3		
2003		370,643	115,495	255,148	18.9	5.9	13.0		
2004		364,711	114,915	249,796	18.5	5.8	12.7		
2005		370,731	132,097	238,634	18.1	6.5	11.6		
2006		373,538	117,467	256,071	18.8	5.9	12.9		
2007		386,573	118,992	267,581	19.2	5.9	13.3		
2008		373,575	123,814	249,761	18.4	6.1	12.3		
2009		368,304	127,776	240,528	18.0	6.2	11.8		
2010		364,565	128,603	235,962	17.7	6.2	11.4		
2011		363,415	123,261	240,154	17.4	5.9	11.5		
2012	20,425,000	355,900	122,063	233,837	17.5	6.0	11.5		2.252
2013	20,585,000	365,792	127,124	238,668	17.9	6.2	11.7	−3.9	2.264
2014	20,771,000	349,715	127,758	221,957	16.8	6.2	10.6	−1.6	2.148
2015	20,970,000	334,821	131,634	203,187	16.0	6.3	9.7	−0.1	2.046
2016	21,203,000	331,073	130,765	200,308	15.6	6.2	9.4	1.7	1.985
2017	21,444,000	326,052	139,822	186,230	15.2	6.5	8.7	2.7	1.944
2018	21,670,000	328,112	139,498	188,614	15.1	6.4	8.7	1.8	1.937
2019	21,803,000	319,010	146,053	172,957	14.6	6.7	7.9	−1.8	1.871
2020	21,919,000	301,706	132,431	169,275	13.8	6.0	7.8	−2.5	1.756
2021	22,156,000	284,848	163,936	120,912	12.9	7.4	5.5	5.3	1.642
2022	22,181,000	275,321	179,792	95,529	12.4	8.1	4.3	−3.2	1.586
2023	22,037,000	247,900	181,239	66,661	11.2	8.2	3.0	−9.6	1.49(e)
2024	21,916,000	220,761	171,194	49,567	10.1	7.8	2.3	−7.8	1.37(e)
2025	21,756,000	214,570	172,603	41,967	9.9	7.9	2.0	−9.3	1.37 (e)
2026									

=== Current vital statistics ===
Period	Live births	Deaths	Natural increase
January–June 2024	109,025		+
January–June 2025	110,652		
Difference	▲ +1,627 (+1.5%)	▼	▼ –

=== Demographic and Health Surveys ===
Total Fertility Rate (TFR) (Wanted Fertility Rate) and Crude Birth Rate (CBR):

Year	total		urban		rural		estate	
Year	CBR	TFR	CBR	TFR	CBR	TFR	CBR	TFR
1981–1983		3,1		2,4		3,2		3,4
1987		2,8 (2,4)		2,3 (1,9)		2,9 (2,4)		3,4 (3,2)
2006–2007	18,7	2,3 (2,1)	18,5	2,2 (2,0)	18,6	2,3 (2,1)	20,0	2,5 (2,1)
2024		1.3		1.2		1.3		1.6

=== Life expectancy ===
Life expectancy in Sri Lanka since 1901

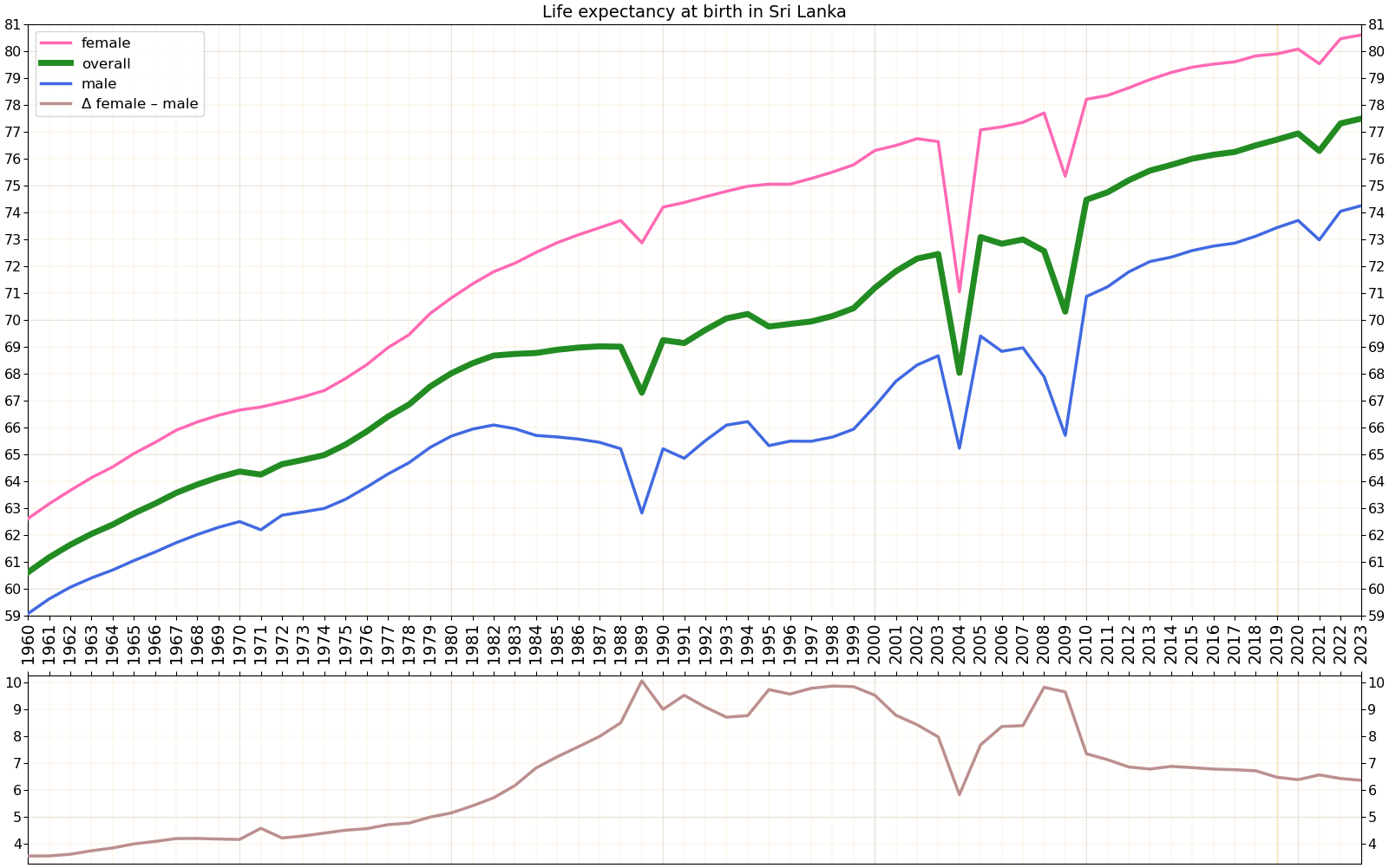
Life expectancy in Sri Lanka since 1960 by gender

Period	Life expectancy in Years	Period	Life expectancy in Years
1950–1955	54.5	1985–1990	68.9
1955–1960	58.3	1990–1995	70.0
1960–1965	60.3	1995–2000	69.1
1965–1970	62.9	2000–2005	73.2
1970–1975	65.2	2005–2010	74.1
1975–1980	67.0	2010–2015	74.6
1980–1985	69.1		

== Ethnicity ==
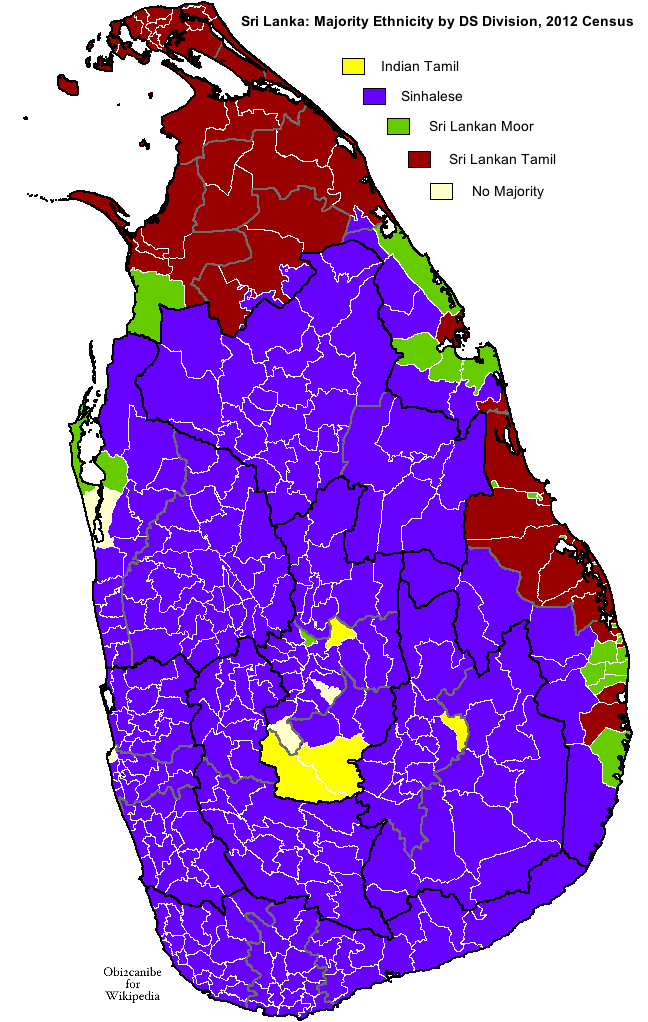
Majority ethnicity by DS Division according to 2012 census

The Sinhalese make up 74.1% of the population (according to 2024 census) and are concentrated in the densely populated south-west and central parts of the island.

The Sri Lanka Tamils, who live predominantly in the north and east of the island, form the largest minority group at 12.3% (according to the 2024 census) of the population.

The Moors, descendants of Arab + Indian traders and native Sri Lankan Tamils, form the third largest ethnic group at 10.5% of the population. These Tamil-speaking Muslims are mostly concentrated in urban areas in the southern parts of the island with substantial populations in the Central and Eastern provinces. During times of Portuguese colonization, Moors were persecuted, and many forced to retreat to the central highlands and the eastern coast.

There are also Indian Tamils who form a distinct ethnic group comprising 4.1% of the population. The British brought them to Sri Lanka in the 19th century as tea and rubber plantation workers, and they remain concentrated in the "tea country" of south-central Sri Lanka. The Indian Tamils of Sri Lanka were considered to be "stateless" as they were denied Ceylonese citizenship and simultaneously stripped of Indian citizenship, with over 300,000 Indian Tamils were deported back to India, due to the agreement between Sri Lanka and India in 1964. Under the pact, India granted citizenship to the remainder, some 200,000 of whom now live in India. Another 75,000 Indian Tamils, who themselves or whose parents once applied for Indian citizenship, now wish to remain in Sri Lanka. The government has stated these Tamils will not be forced to return to India, although they are not technically citizens of Sri Lanka. By the 1990s most Indian Tamils had received Sri Lankan citizenship, and some even were not granted Sri Lankan citizenship until 2003.

Smaller minorities include the Veddas, the indigenous people of Sri Lanka; Malays, who descend from colonial-era settlers; the Burghers, who are descendants of European colonists, principally from Portugal, the Netherlands and the UK; the ethnic Chinese migrants who came to the island in the 18th and 19th centuries; and the Kaffirs, a small population who are descended from Africans.

Population of Sri Lanka by ethnic group 1881 to 2012
Year	Sinhalese		Sri Lankan Tamils (Note: Indian Tamils were only classified as a separate ethnic group from 1911 onwards. Prior to this they were included with Sri Lankan Tamils.)		Sri Lankan Moors (Note: Indian Moors were only classified as a separate ethnic group from 1911 to 1971. Prior to 1911 they were included with Sri Lankan Moors. After 1971 they were included with Others.)		Indian Tamils		Sri Lankan Malays		Burghers/ Eurasian		Indian Moors		Others		Total No.
Year	No.	%	No.	%	No.	%	No.	%	No.	%	No.	%	No.	%	No.	%	Total No.
1881 Census	1,846,600	66.91%	687,200	24.90%	184,500	6.69%			8,900	0.32%	17,900	0.65%			14,500	0.53%	2,759,700
1891 Census	2,041,200	67.86%	723,900	24.07%	197,200	6.56%			10,100	0.34%	21,200	0.70%			14,200	0.47%	3,007,800
1901 Census	2,330,800	65.36%	951,700	26.69%	228,000	6.39%			11,900	0.33%	23,500	0.66%			20,000	0.56%	3,566,000
1911 Census	2,715,500	66.13%	528,000	12.86%	233,900	5.70%	531,000	12.93%	13,000	0.32%	26,700	0.65%	32,700	0.80%	25,600	0.62%	4,106,400
1921 Census	3,016,200	67.05%	517,300	11.50%	251,900	5.60%	602,700	13.40%	13,400	0.30%	29,400	0.65%	33,000	0.73%	34,600	0.77%	4,498,600
1931 Estimate	3,473,000	65.45%	598,900	11.29%	289,600	5.46%	818,500	15.43%	16,000	0.30%	32,300	0.61%	36,300	0.68%	41,800	0.79%	5,306,000
1946 Census (Note: The 1941 Census was postponed due to World War II.)	4,620,500	69.41%	733,700	11.02%	373,600	5.61%	780,600	11.73%	22,500	0.34%	41,900	0.63%	35,600	0.53%	48,900	0.73%	6,657,300
1953 Census (Note: The 1951 Census was postponed due to a shortage of paper at the time.)	5,616,700	69.36%	884,700	10.93%	464,000	5.73%	974,100	12.03%	25,400	0.31%	46,000	0.57%	47,500	0.59%	39,500	0.49%	8,097,900
1963 Census	7,512,900	71.00%	1,164,700	11.01%	626,800	5.92%	1,123,000	10.61%	33,400	0.32%	45,900	0.43%	55,400	0.52%	19,900	0.19%	10,582,000
1971 Census	9,131,241	71.96%	1,423,981	11.22%	855,724	6.74%	1,174,606	9.26%	43,459	0.34%	45,376	0.36%			15,510	0.12%	12,689,897
1981 Census	10,979,561	73.95%	1,886,872	12.71%	1,046,926	7.05%	818,656	5.51%	46,963	0.32%	39,374	0.27%			28,398	0.19%	14,846,750
2001 Census (Note: 2001 Census was only carried out in 18 of the 25 districts. Inclusion of data would be misleading.)																	
2011 Census (Note: The official census dates for the 2011 Census was 20 March 2012.)	15,250,081	74.90%	2,269,266	11.15%	1,892,638	9.30%	839,504	4.12%	44,130	0.22%	38,293	0.19%			25,527	0.13%	20,359,439
2024 Census	16,144,037	74.10%	2,681,627	12.30%	2,283,246	10.50%	600,360	2.78%							72,530	0.30%	21,781,800

Data from the 2011 census

Sinhalese

Sri Lankan Tamils

Sri Lankan Moors

Indian/Malayaga Tamils

== Languages ==
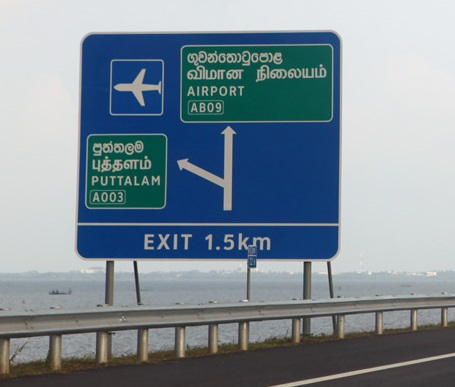
A multi-lingual road sign

Sinhala, an Indo-Aryan language, is the first language of Sinhalese people. Unlike Tamil, the Sinhala language is not found in India and is unique to Sri Lanka.

Tamil, a Dravidian language, is the first language of native Sri Lankan Tamils. Tamil is also the first language of the majority of Sri Lankan Moors and the Indian Tamils – according to the 2012 census 98% of Sri Lankan Moors could speak Tamil but only 59% could speak Sinhala.

English is fluently spoken by approximately 23.8% of Sri Lanka's population, and widely used for official and commercial purposes.

Malays speak Sri Lankan Malay, a Creole language mixing Sinhala, Tamil and Malay. Many of the Burghers speak Sri Lankan Indo-Portuguese although its use has declined and the majority now speak Sinhala. The Veddas speak Vedda, a Creole language closely based on Sinhala. Use of English has declined since independence, but it continues to be spoken by many in the middle and upper middle classes, particularly in Colombo. According to the 2012 census 24% of the population could speak English. The government is seeking to reverse the decline in the use of English, mainly for economic but also for political reasons. According to the constitution Sinhala and Tamil are official languages whilst English is the “link” language.

== Religion ==
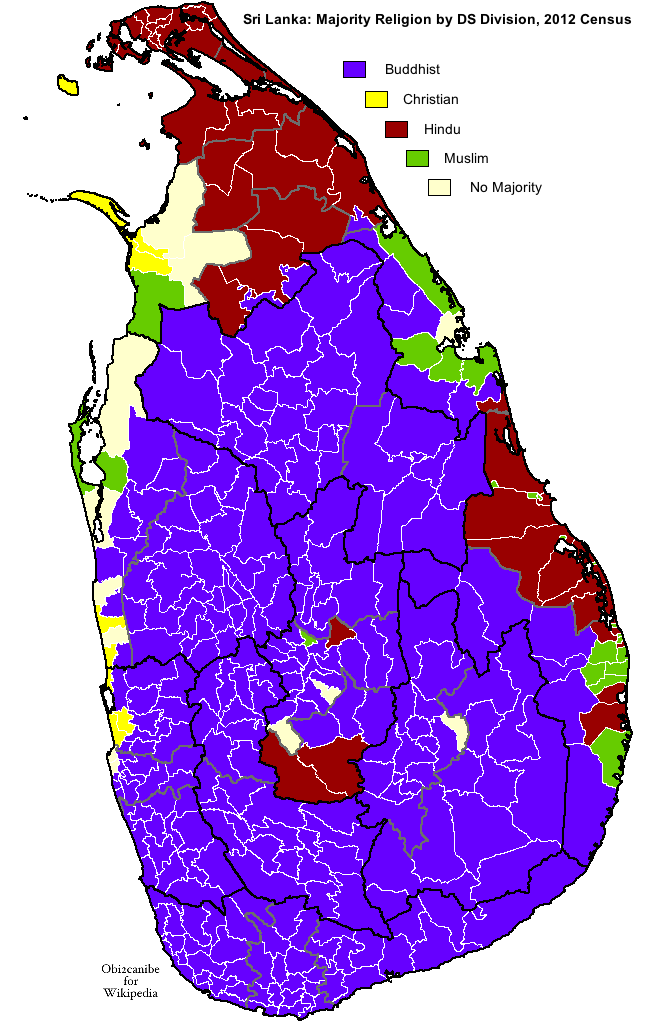
Majority religion by DS Division according to 2024 census

Religion in Sri Lanka (2024)
1. Buddhism (69.8%)
2. Hinduism (12.6%)
3. Islam (10.7%)
4. Roman Catholic (5.62%)
5. Other Christian (1.30%)
6. Other (0.00%)

According to the 2024 census Buddhists make up 69.78% of the population, Hindus 12.56%, Muslims 10.73% and Christians 6.92%. The Sinhalese are predominantly Buddhist, the majority of Tamils practice Hinduism, and Moors and Malays are mostly Muslim. Sizeable minorities of both Sinhalese and Tamils are Christians, most of whom are Roman Catholic. The Burgher population is mostly Roman Catholic or Presbyterian. The Veddas have Animist and Buddhist practices. The 1978 constitution, while assuring freedom of religion, gives "the foremost place" to Buddhism.

Population of Sri Lanka by religion 1881 to 2024
Year	Buddhist		Hindu		Muslim		Christian		Others		Total
Year	No.	%	No.	%	No.	%	No.	%	No.	%	No.
1881 Census	1,698,100	61.53%	593,600	21.51%	197,800	7.17%	268,000	9.71%	2,300	0.08%	2,759,800
1891 Census	1,877,000	62.40%	615,900	20.48%	212,000	7.05%	302,100	10.04%	800	0.03%	3,007,800
1901 Census	2,141,400	60.06%	826,800	23.19%	246,100	6.90%	349,200	9.79%	2,500	0.07%	3,566,000
1911 Census	2,474,200	60.25%	938,300	22.85%	283,600	6.91%	409,200	9.96%	1,100	0.03%	4,106,400
1921 Census	2,769,800	61.57%	982,100	21.83%	302,500	6.72%	443,400	9.86%	800	0.02%	4,498,600
1931 Estimate	3,266,600	61.55%	1,166,900	21.99%	354,200	6.67%	518,100	9.76%	1,100	0.02%	5,306,900
1946 Census	4,294,900	64.51%	1,320,400	19.83%	436,600	6.56%	603,200	9.06%	2,200	0.03%	6,657,300
1953 Census	5,209,400	64.33%	1,610,500	19.89%	541,500	6.69%	724,400	8.95%	12,100	0.15%	8,097,900
1963 Census	7,003,300	66.18%	1,958,400	18.51%	724,000	6.84%	884,900	8.36%	11,400	0.11%	10,582,000
1971 Census	8,536,868	67.27%	2,238,666	17.64%	901,785	7.11%	1,004,326	7.91%	8,252	0.07%	12,689,897
1981 Census	10,288,325	69.30%	2,297,806	15.48%	1,121,717	7.56%	1,130,568	7.61%	8,334	0.06%	14,846,750
2001 Census											
2012 Census	14,272,056	70.10%	2,561,299	12.58%	1,967,523	9.66%	1,552,161	7.62%	6,400	0.03%	20,359,439
2024 Census	15,199,093	69.78%	2,734,839	12.56%	2,337,379	10.73%	1,506,533	6.92%	3,956	0.001%	21,781,800

== Migration ==
=== Immigration ===
As of 2017, 40,018 foreign-born people lived in Sri Lanka as per the United Nations' population division.

Country of birth	Population (2017)
India	10,814
Italy	5,107
China	2,482
Kuwait	1,755
United Arab Emirates	1,689
Saudi Arabia	1,417
Maldives	1,409
United Kingdom	1,193
Malaysia	925
Japan	849
Pakistan	829
Lebanon	741
Bangladesh	674
United States	613
Singapore	612
South Korea	611
Germany	561

=== Net Migration ===
Sri Lanka – Net Migration and Mid-Year Population (2013–2024)
Time Period	Year	Net Migration	Mid-Year Population (‘000)
July 2012 – June 2013	2013	−71,730	20,483
July 2013 – June 2014	2014	−44,714	20,675
July 2014 – June 2015	2015	−17,055	20,870
July 2015 – June 2016	2016	34,995	21,107
July 2016 – June 2017	2017	57,028	21,351
July 2017 – June 2018	2018*	32,826	21,574
July 2018 – June 2019	2019*	−54,681	21,707
July 2019 – June 2020	2020*	−44,160	21,919
July 2020 – June 2021	2021*	77,600	22,152
July 2021 – June 2022	2022*	−85,572	22,177
July 2022 – June 2023	2023*	−222,715	22,033
July 2023 – June 2024	2024*	−176,932	21,889

Note: * Provisional data.
