= Dutch Ceylon =

Dutch colony in Sri Lanka, 1640–1796

Coordinates: 2°11′20″N 102°23′4″E

Governorate of Ceylon Nederlands-Zeylan (Dutch) ලන්දේසි ලංකාව (Sinhala) landēsi lankāva ஒல்லாந்து சிலோன் (Tamil) Ollāntu Cilōṉ
- 1640–1796
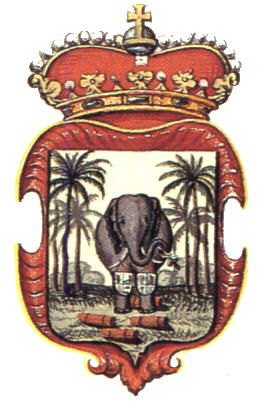
- Flag Coat of arms
- Anthem: Het Wilhelmus ("The William")
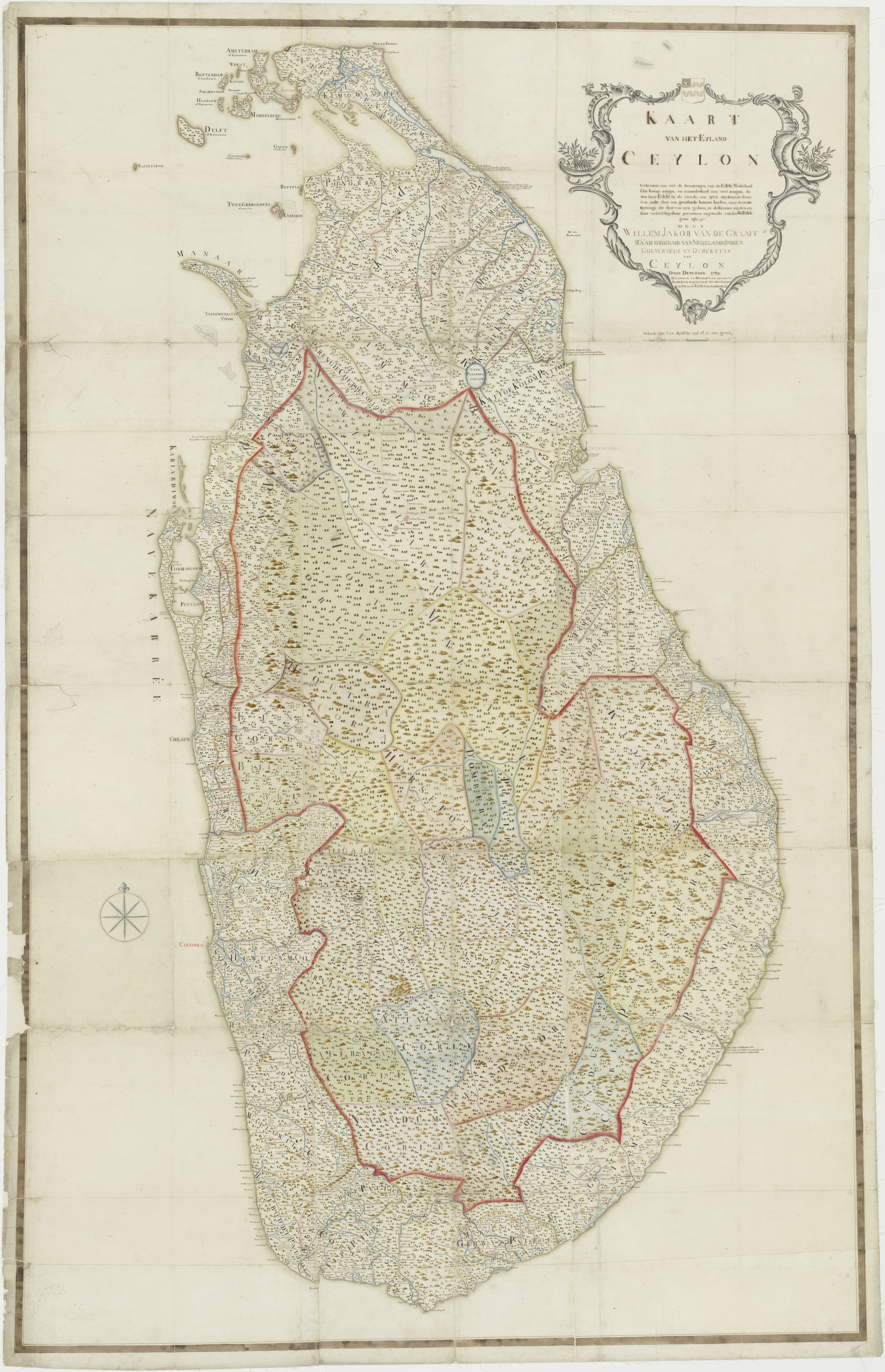
- Dutch map of Sri Lanka in 1789

- Territorial evolution of Dutch Ceylon
- Status: Governorate of the Dutch East India Company
- Capital: Galle (1640–1658); Colombo (1658–1796)
- Common languages: Dutch (official); Sinhala; Tamil
- Governor
  - 1640: Willem Jacobszoon Coster
  - 1794–1796: Johan van Angelbeek
- Historical era: Imperialism
  - Established: 13 March 1640
  - Disestablished: 16 February 1796
- Currency: Dutch Guilder
| Preceded by | Succeeded by |
| Portuguese Ceylon; Kingdom of Sitawaka | Kingdom of Kandy; British Ceylon |

Dutch Ceylon (Sinhala: ලන්දේසි ලංකාව; Tamil: ஒல்லாந்த இலங்கை) was a governorate established in present-day Sri Lanka by the Dutch East India Company. Although the Dutch managed to capture most of the coastal areas in Sri Lanka, they were never able to control the Kingdom of Kandy located in the interior of the island. Dutch Ceylon existed from 1640 until 1796.

In the early 17th century, Sri Lanka was partly ruled by the Portuguese and partly by Sri Lankan (primarily of Sinhalese origin) kingdoms, who were constantly battling the Portuguese. Although the Portuguese were not winning the war, their rule was oppressive to the people of those areas controlled by them. While the Portuguese were engaged in a long war of independence from Spanish rule, the Sinhalese king (the king of Kandy) invited the Dutch to help defeat the Portuguese. The Dutch interest in Ceylon was to have a united battle front against the Iberians at that time.

== History ==
=== Background ===
==== The Portuguese ====
The Dutch were invited by the Sinhalese to help fight the Portuguese. They signed the Kandyan Treaty of 1638 with Rajasinghe II and soon embarked on a war against their common enemy. As such the Dutch were appointed as a protector of the country.

Meanwhile, however, Rajasinghe II approached the French and offered them the Trincomalee fort as a check against Dutch power. The Dutch captured Trincomalee from the French and controlled all the maritime provinces of the island. Rajasinghe and the Dutch were both playing a double game trying to outwit each other, and the treaty of 1638 was never implemented. The Dutch ruled all the Tamil provinces and brought Tanjore Tamil workers to work in the cinnamon gardens in the Western Province and tobacco farms in Jaffna. The capital of Dutch Coromandel was in Pulicat and they brought needed manpower from Dutch India.

SENARAT had divided his kingdom between his own son Rajasinha, to whom were allotted the 'Five Countries above the mountains,' practically the modem Kandy District, with the title of king, and the other sons of Dona Catharina, Kumarasinha and Vijayapala, who obtained Uva and Matale respectively. Kumarasinha was poisoned by Rajasinha before Senarat's death, which took place in 1635, and the youngest prince became the sole king as Rajasinha II. (1635–1687). The treaty of 1634 was not very strictly observed, and the new sovereign speedily called in the assistance of the Dutch in 1636, offering them a fort at Kottiyar or Batticaloa and guaranteeing the expenses of the fleet. The authorities of the East India Company at Batavia, who already had their eyes on the Lanka cinnamon trade, seized the opportunity and instructed their Admiral, Adam Westerwold, who was setting out to blockade Goa, to call at Lanka on his return voyage. Meanwhile, envoys were sent to Rajasinha, at whose court they arrived in 1637. After some negotiations, they in company with three Sinhala went on to join Westerwold off Goa and were witnesses of an action between the Dutch and Portuguese fleets, in which the latter was worsted on January 4, 1638. The Admiral then decided to send in advance of himself the Vice-Commandeur Coster with a small squadron, which arrived at Trincomalee on April 3.

==== The Dutch and Portuguese ====
Portuguese rule was always in the maritime provinces and the people whom they converted were the coastal peoples. They were the backbone of their power. Many of the princes they converted had either died or were no longer Catholic. The rest of Ceylon remained in the Buddhist majority and Hindu religions.

The Dutch were used by the Sinhalese king to take revenge on the Portuguese who wanted to expand their rule. The coming of the Dutch ensured that the Portuguese had two enemies to deal with so finally the Portuguese were forced to sign a treaty with the Dutch and come to terms with their enemies. Finally, the Portuguese left Ceylon.

Portugal was at war with its ruler, the King of Spain. Once Portugal obtained its freedom from Spain in 1640, the Netherlands settled for peace with Portugal. Then they divided the occupied areas of Ceylon amicably under a treaty signed in Goa. Slowly, the Dutch became the rulers of coastal and outer areas of Ceylon and Indonesia, and the Portuguese were left with smaller pieces of territory than those of the Dutch and the English.

==== Dutch–Portuguese War ====
In the east, Portugal held territories not only in Ceylon but in India, in the Persian Gulf, and what is now Indonesia, then referred to as the East Indies.

From 1580 to 1640, the throne of Portugal was held by the Habsburg kings of Spain resulting in the biggest colonial empire until then (see Iberian Union). In 1583 Philip I of Portugal, II of Spain, sent his combined Iberian fleet to clear the French traders from the Azores, decisively hanging his prisoners-of-war from the yardarms and contributing to the "Black Legend". The Azores were the last part of Portugal to resist Philip's reign.

The Netherlands meanwhile were in open revolt against their Habsburg overlord and declared themselves a Republic in 1581. Prior to 1580 Dutch merchants had procured colonial produce mostly from Lisbon, but the Iberian Union cut off this supply. Survival of the fledgling republic depended on their going into the colonial business themselves.

With two global empires to rule, and with the growing colonial competition with the Dutch, English and French, the Habsburg kings neglected the protection of some of the Portuguese possessions around the world. In this period Portugal lost a great number of lands to the new colonial rivals.

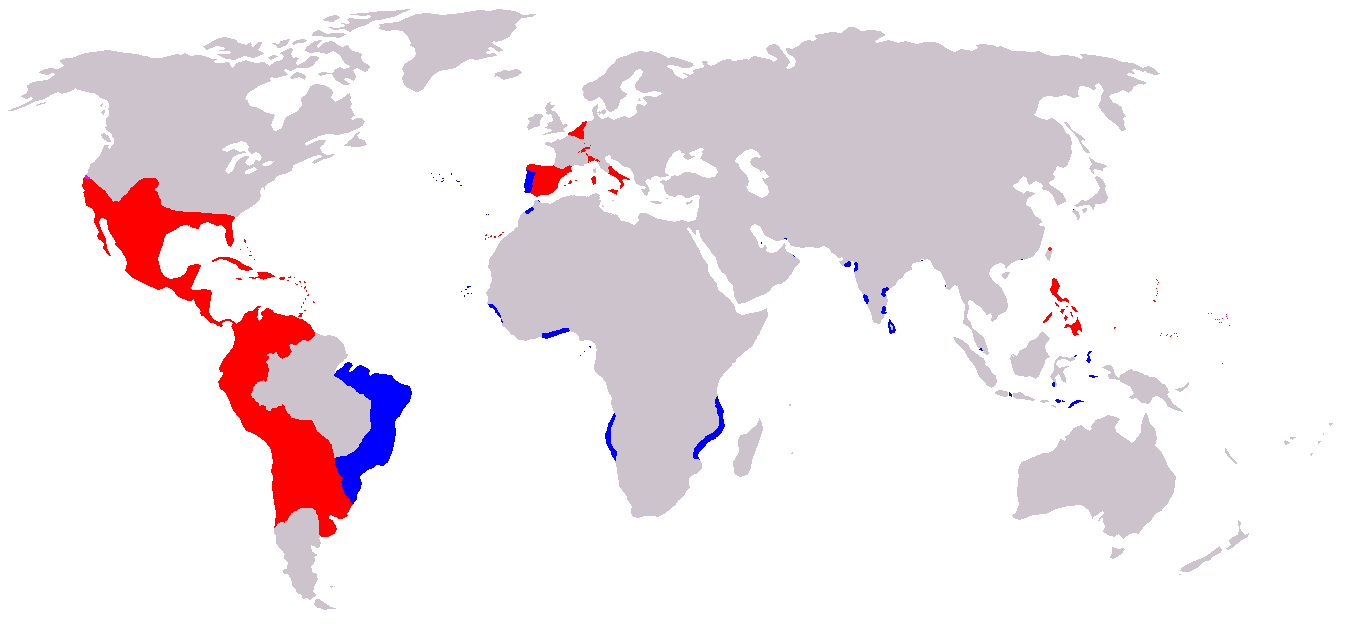
A map of the lands of the Habsburg kings in the period of personal union of Portugal (blue) and Spain (red/pink) (1580–1640)

During the Twelve Years' Truce (1609–21) the Dutch made their navy a priority in order to devastate Spanish maritime trade — upon which much of Spain's economy depended — after the resumption of war. In 1627, the Castilian economy collapsed. Even with a number of victories, Spanish resources were now fully stretched across Europe and also at sea protecting their vital shipping against the greatly improved Dutch fleet. Spain's enemies, such as the Netherlands and England, coveted its overseas wealth, and in many cases found it easier to attack poorly-defended Portuguese outposts than Spanish ones. The Spanish were simply no longer able to cope with naval threats. In the Dutch–Portuguese War that followed many erstwhile Portuguese possession fell into Dutch hands.

Between 1638 and 1640 the Netherlands even came to control part of Brazil's northeast region, with their capital in Recife. The Portuguese won a significant victory in the Second Battle of Guararapes in 1649. By 1654, the Netherlands had surrendered and returned control of all Brazilian land to the Portuguese.

Although Dutch Brazil was conquered, during the course of the 17th century the Dutch were able to occupy Ceylon, the Cape of Good Hope, and the East Indies, and to take over the trade with Japan at Nagasaki. Portugal's Asiatic territories were reduced to bases at Portuguese Macau, Portuguese Timor and Portuguese India.

=== Admiral van Spilbergen ===
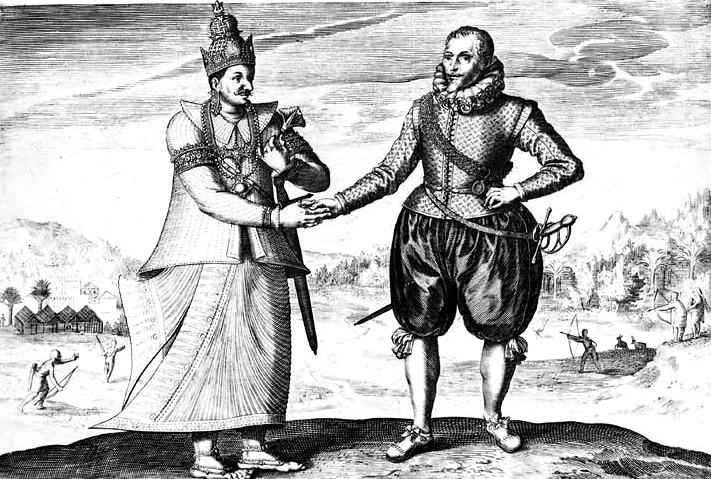
Vimaladharmasurya I receiving Joris van Spilbergen, 1603

In the year 1602, on 2 May, the Dutch Admiral Joris van Spilbergen arrived in Ceylon with three ships from the Dutch port of Veere after a 12-month voyage. Visiting Kandy, the seat of King Vimaladharmasuriya I, Spilbergen and the king developed cordial relations. The king's admiration for his new-found friend was so deep that he began to learn the Dutch language saying ‘Kandy is now Flanders’. They discussed future relations, focussing on possible Dutch military assistance to expel the Portuguese from the coastal areas as well as the trade in cinnamon and pepper. As a token of his friendship, the Dutch Admiral left in the King's service two versatile and skilled musicians: Erasmus Matsberger and Hans Rempel.

=== Second fleet and the massacre at Batticaloa Beach ===
Shortly after the successful visit of van Spilbergen, a second Dutch fleet under the command of Sebalt de Weert arrived on the island. De Weert was a very skilful commander who discovered the Falkland Islands during the attempt by Dutch Admirals Cordes and Mahu to find an alternative route to the East Indies through Cape Horn in 1598. After an initial agreement with the king of Kandy, he returned in 1603 to Batticaloa with a fleet of six ships to take part in a joint effort to oust the Portuguese from the island. During his stay, he took four passing Portuguese ships but released the Portuguese crews who had surrendered to the Dutch on the promise of a quarter. The king was very angered by this action and after a perceived insult to his wife, he ordered his men to kill de Weert and 50 of his unarmed compatriots.

=== First victory at Batticaloa ===
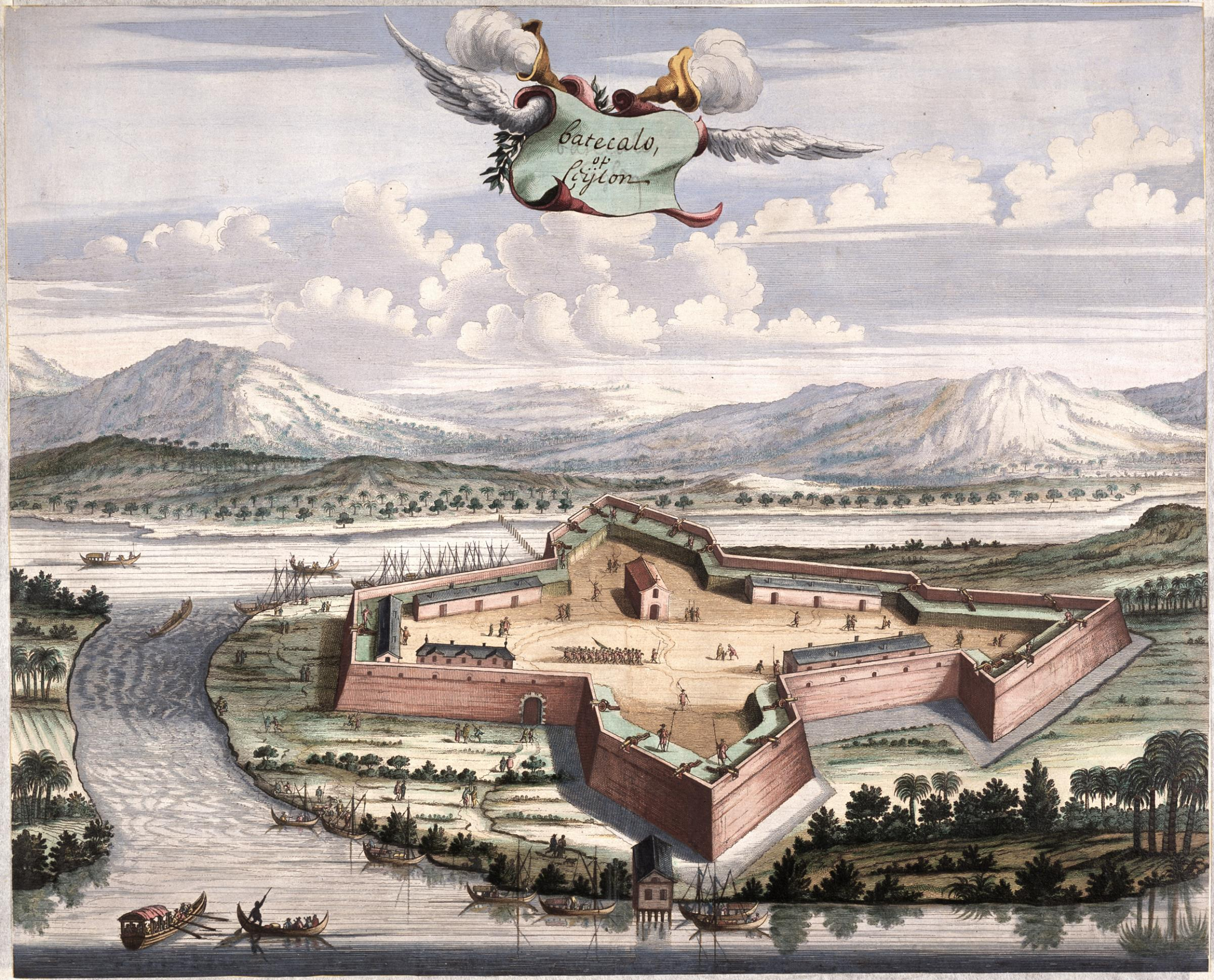
The Batticaloa fort, around 1665

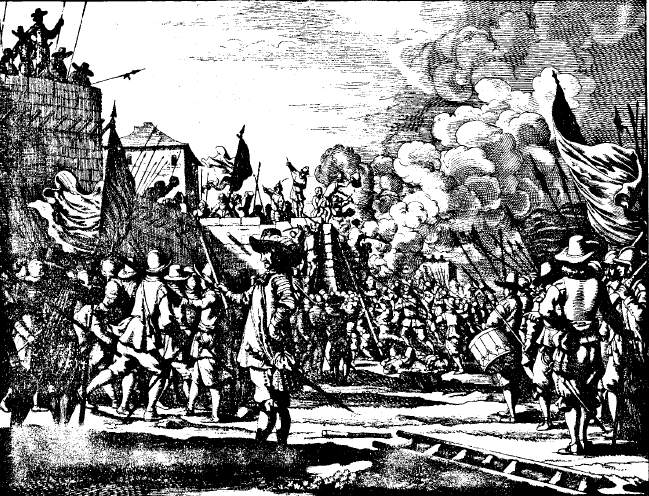
The Dutch storm the fort of Galle in 1640.

After this unhappy event, the Dutch concentrated on organising their trade with the East Indian spice islands. It took more than three decades before the Dutch again undertook action to expel the Portuguese who had arrived some 150 years earlier and were firmly established on the island. After many bloody wars with the Portuguese, King Rajasingha II became convinced that lasting peace with the Portuguese was not possible and he invited the Dutch to force them off the island. At that time the Dutch were still at war with Portugal, which was in a personal union with Spain. The Dutch Council of the Indies in Batavia (Dutch East India) complied with this request and in 1637 sent four ships to the island under Captain Jan Thijssen Payart who signed a treaty with the king. On 4 January 1638 a decisive sea engagement took place off the coast of Goa between Portuguese and Dutch naval forces. The Portuguese fleet was decimated in this battle and the victorious Dutch Admiral Adam Westerwolt (1580–1639) decided to attack the Portuguese fort at Batticaloa on Ceylon with a fleet of five ships and 800 men. In coalition with strong Singhalese forces, he conquered the fort on 18 May 1638.

Five days later, following this victorious conquest, Westerwolt in the name of the States General, Prince Frederik Hendrik and the Dutch East India Company agreed to a new treaty with King Rajasingha in his palace in Batticaloa. The treaty was a landmark and set the tone for future relations between the Kandyan Kings and the Dutch. Under the treaty the Dutch were to have a monopoly over all trades except elephants. The forts captured from the Portuguese would be garrisoned by the Dutch or demolished, as the king thought fit. The crucial clause ‘as the king thought fit’ was however only included in the Sinhala and not in the Dutch text of the treaty. This later gave rise to much disagreement between the two parties. The same goes for the clause stating that the king would pay any expenses incurred by the Dutch in the war effort against the Portuguese.

Slowly but surely, the Dutch land and naval forces continued to oust the Portuguese from parts of Ceylon. In February 1640, the Portuguese fort of Negombo, a short distance north of Colombo was captured by Philip Lucasz. Following his sudden death, the command was devolved to the capable Willem Jacobsz Coster who earlier fought under Admiral Westerwolt on the east coast. Against overwhelming odds he besieged the strong fort at Galle. After storming the city on 13 March 1640, he became master of it within a few hours. For the next 18 years, Galle would remain the centre of Dutch power in Ceylon.

=== Dutch Ceylon (1664–1795) ===
The Dutch retained the areas they had captured as compensation for the cost of war and gradually extended their land.

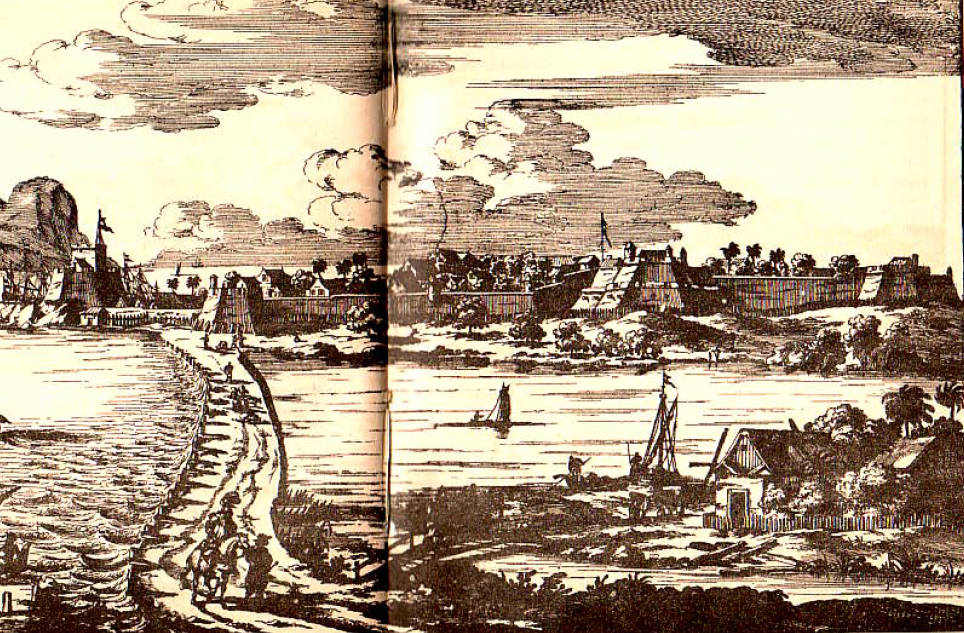
Galle fort as seen from the bazaar, between 1640 and 1672

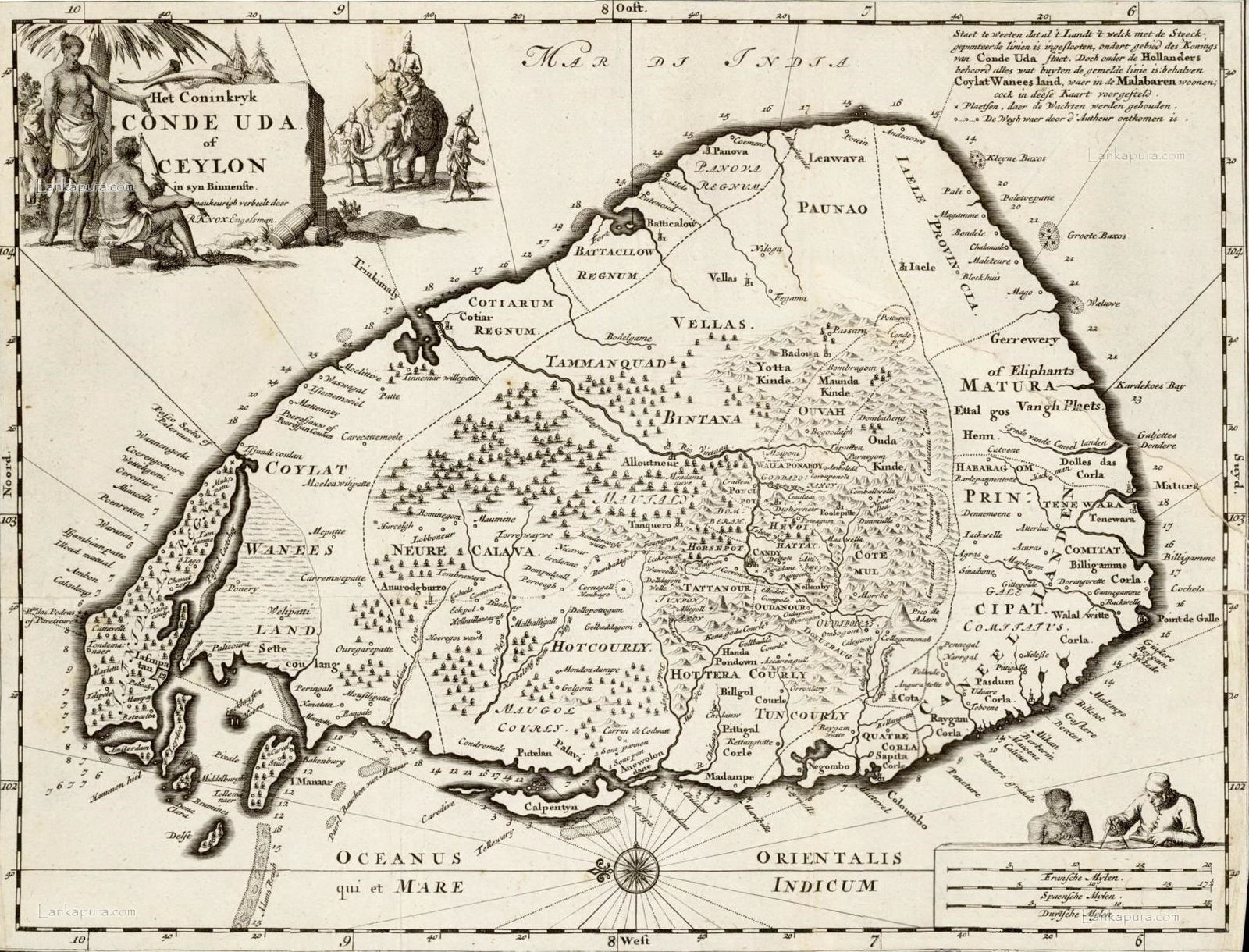
1681 map of Dutch Ceylon and the Kingdom of Kandy (North is on the left).

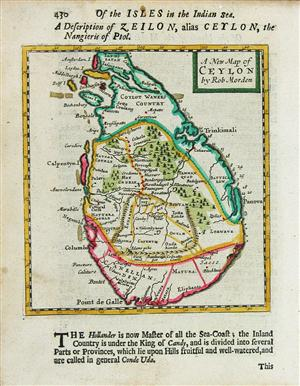
By 1688 the Dutch controlled the regions outlined in green and magenta.
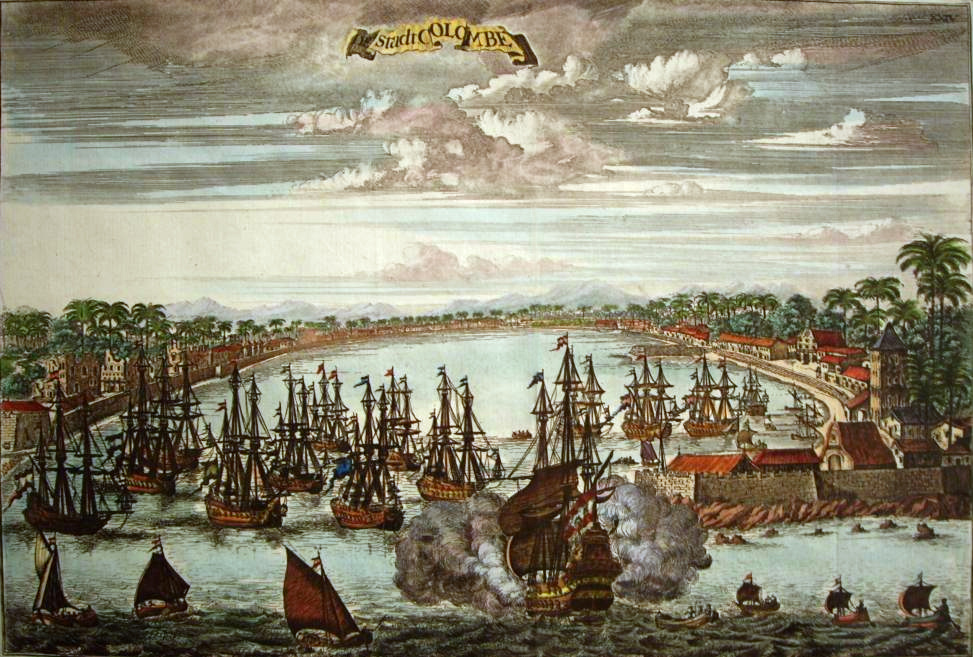
Dutch Colombo, based on an engraving of circa 1680

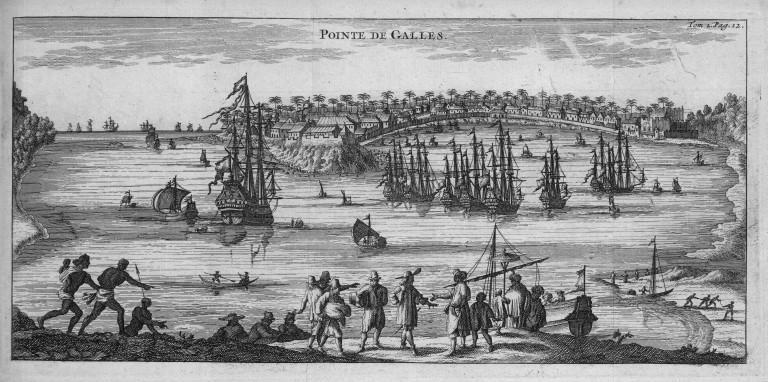
View of the port of Galle in Ceylon in 1754.

=== British takeover ===
The period of Dutch rule over Ceylon would soon come to an end due to changing events in Europe. In 1792, the French Revolutionary Wars broke out between Republican France and a coalition of European nations, which included the Dutch Republic. In 1794, a French invasion force conquered the Dutch Republic, and Prince William V, the Dutch stadtholder, fled into exile with his family to Great Britain in order to escape the French. The previous regime was replaced by the French-installed Batavian Republic, which served as a de facto French protectorate. This led to confusion throughout the Dutch colonial empire between which regime to support, that of the deposed stadtholder in Britain or the Batavian Republic.

A few years prior, Governor Falck had died in 1785 after a short illness. He was succeeded by Willem Jacob van de Graaf, an aggressive Dutch expansionist who attempted to extend the colonial borders well beyond established limits. In 1792, van de Graaf was readying the colony for a war with the Kingdom of Kandy. However, the Dutch East India Company administration in Batavia realised the difficulties such a war would pose given events in Europe and ordered van de Graaf to abandon his war plans. In protest, van de Graaf resigned from his position as Governor and was succeeded by Johan van Angelbeek, who would serve as the last Dutch Governor of Ceylon.

In 1795, Prince William V issued in February 1795 orders to Johan van Angelbeek to put his forces, forts and warships under British protection. He should consider the British troops ‘… belonging to a power that is in friendship and alliance with their High Mightinesses (the Governors of the VOC), and who come to prevent the Colony from being invaded by the French’. After the war, the British government promised to restore the colony to the Dutch. Van Angelbeek first accepted Prince William's letter and agreed with the British presence on the island.

Later, however, van Angelbeek and his Political Council took the fateful decision that the Batavian Republic was considered the sovereign of the colonies and their troops should be ordered to resist any British presence on the island. But the Dutch Governor did not realise that British intrigues had already undermined his military capabilities. The defence of Dutch Ceylon was undertaken mainly by European mercenaries, in particular, the De Meuron Regiment: 1,000 men strong and for two-thirds consisting of Swiss soldiers. On 30 March 1795, British official Hugh Cleghorn signed a contract with the proprietor of the Regiment, Count Charles-Daniel de Meuron to transfer his regiment into British service for the sum of £6,000. After a token resistance, van Angelbeek gave up. Many Dutch officers and soldiers felt betrayed by their own Governor and at the end of the siege of Colombo turned their heavy guns on the Governor's palace.

On 14 February 1796, the Dutch forces surrendered with minimal bloodshed. Pierre Frédéric de Meuron, brother of Count Charles-Daniel, changed his blue Dutch uniform for a red British one and became Military Governor of Ceylon in September 1797 until he was relieved by Frederick North, the first British Governor.

== Administration ==
Governor's country house on the Grote Pas near Colombo, c. 1750

Dutch Ceylon was administered by a Governor appointed by the Governor General of the Dutch East Indies.

== Legacy ==
=== Dutch diaspora ===
Many of the Dutch Burghers migrated to Australia after British rule ended in 1948 to take advantage of the White Australia policy due to their European descent.

=== Placenames ===
The islands of the Palk Strait were renamed during Dutch rule in the Dutch language as Kayts, Delft and other cities of the Netherlands. The Dutch priest Philippus Baldeus has written a great historical record similar to Mahavamsa on the Jaffna people and their culture and it was immediately published in Dutch and German with several beautiful pictures. At the Point Pedro Market Square, a granite stone inscription still marks the place where Rev. Baldeus preached to the Tamils under a big tamarind tree. This tamarind tree was uprooted during the cyclone of 1964.

=== Language ===
When the Dutch arrived in Ceylon, Portuguese was a recognized language in the occupied areas of the island. It was, however, a Portuguese creole due to its relationship with the native languages.

Although this language is no longer spoken there are Dutch influences found in the Sinhala and Tamil languages. There is also a portion of the Sri Lankan population with Dutch surnames, often people of mixed Dutch and Sri Lankan heritage, who are known as Burghers.

=== Caste-based slavery ===
In the 1700s, the Dutch sanctioned caste-based slavery in Jaffna Sri Lanka. Although this was abolished by the British (Ordinance 20 of 1844) the discrimination still continues in the north despite the legislation introduced in the 1950s and in the 1970s (Prevention of Social Disabilities Act, No. 21 of 1957, 18 of 1971) by the Sri Lankan Government to prohibit caste-based discrimination.

=== Dutch language policy ===
During the 140 years of Dutch control, they pursued an active policy of trying to make Dutch the principal language on the island. This included setting up schools to teach Dutch to local people, although these often suffered from a lack of qualified teachers. However, the Dutch language policy by and large failed. One reason for this was that Portuguese had already become a language of wider communication (LWC) in Ceylon prior to 1656.

=== Dutch loanwords in Sinhala and Tamil ===
When the Dutch language was introduced it also mingled with indigenous and Portuguese influences.

Nevertheless, there are many Dutch loanwords in the two official languages of Sri Lanka, Sinhala and Tamil. Nicoline van der Sijs reckons that there are some 230 Dutch loanwords in Sinhala. Many of these are in the fields of warfare, trade and agriculture. For example, the Sinhala word for 'potato', අර්තාපල් pronounced artapal,' hospital ' (ඉස්පිරිතාලෙ), ඉස්කුරුප්පුව and ඉස්තෝප්පුව comes from Dutch. In the modern Sri Lankan Tamil language, there are reckoned to be about 50 Dutch loanwords.

== See also ==
- Kingdom of Jaffna (1215–1624)
- Portuguese Ceylon (1505–1658)
- Kingdom of Kandy (1469–1815)
- British Ceylon (1815–1948)
