= Sellankandal =

Coordinates: 8°02′N 79°54′E

Sellankandal is a village situated 10 km inland from coastal Puttalam city in the North Western Province of Sri Lanka. It is the primary settlement of people of Black African descent in Sri Lanka called Kaffirs who until the 1930s spoke a Creole version of Portuguese. Most villages speak Sinhala and are found throughout the country as well as in the Middle East. The Baila music, very popular in Sri Lanka since the 1980s, originated centuries ago among this 'kaffir' community. They however complain that they benefitted very little from the popularity of the Baila music.
