= Hugh Nevill =

British civil servant

Hugh L. Nevill (1847 – 1897) was a British colonial civil servant, best known for his scholarship and studies of the culture of Sri Lanka.

== Early life ==
Hugh Nevill was born on 19 June 1847 in Tottenham, one of several sons of Mary (Oridge) (1818-1857)? and William Nevill, a manufacturer and a Fellow of the Geological Society. The couple were married in Godalming, Mary's home town, in 1837. They had a large family, with at least eight children, and although initially based in London, they moved to Godalming as the family grew. Mary died in 1857, when her children were still very young. She was re-buried in the new Nightingale Cemetery, later joined by her husband and two of her children. One of the Hugh's older brothers was Geoffrey (1843-1885), a malacologist and a malacological author who also travelled East, and who worked in the Indian Museum, in Calcutta. Another was Ralph (1845-1917) who, after an apprenticeship with (Sir) George Gilbert Scott, set up his own architectural practice, in Godalming, in 1870.

== Career ==
At the age of seventeen Hugh Nevill travelled to the colony of Ceylon, as Private Secretary to the Chief Justice. Subsequently, he was a Writer in the Ceylon Civil Service, 1869; Commissioner of Requests, Colombo, 1879; District Judge, Matara, 1885; Fiscal for the Central Province, 1886; Assistant to the Government Agent, Trincomalee, 1891 and District Judge, Batticaloa from 1895 to 1897.

== Scholarly contributions ==
Many of the Nevill family were possessed of a scientific and scholarly mindset. William Nevill (1808-1874), the father, was an amateur geologist who wrote A Catalogue of Meteorites, based on his own collection. Ralph Nevill (1845-1917), the architect, published a record of Old Cottage and Domestic Architecture in South-West Surrey. In addition, Hugh's own son, also called Hugh, was to write a book on military history.

Hugh himself was a pioneer student of the origin and development of Sinhala, the main language of Sri Lanka, and of the dialects of the Veddhas, Rodiyas, and Vanniyas. He was the founder and a major contributor of the scholarly journal The Taprobanian, and of the Kandyan Society of Arts. His interests and publications were extremely broad, covering anthropology, archaeology, botany, ethnology, folklore, geography, geology, history, mythology, palaeography, philology, and zoology.

Hugh also shared an interest in malacology with his elder brother Geoffrey: together they worked on researching the molluscs of India. Like his brother, Hugh also had a scientific collection.

== The Hugh Nevill Collections ==
During his 32 years in Sri Lanka, Nevill assembled a collection of 2,227 prose and verse manuscripts, mostly in Sinhala, Malayalam, Tamil, and Pali. One of these manuscripts is the Sri Lanka Portuguese Creole Manuscript, the earliest text of significant length in the Indo-Portuguese creole spoken by the Burghers and Kaffirs communities of Sri Lanka. The manuscript collection is now kept at the British Library.

Hugh produced a critical catalogue of the collection, in two volumes, but died before it was published. A more detailed description, in seven volumes, was eventually prepared by K. D. Somadasa and was published by the British Library.

Many remaining objects from Nevill's extensive and eclectic collecting in Sri Lanka were acquired in 1898, following his death the previous year, by the British Museum.

== Family life ==
Hugh married Alice (Vaughan) (1852-1919) and they had a son and daughter; the son - also called Hugh Lewis Nevill - was born in 1877.

Already gravely ill, and only recently returned from Ceylon, Hugh Nevill died at Hyères in France on 10 April 1897.

Hugh Lewis Nevill (1877-1915), the son, was educated at Clifton College, before entering the Royal Military Academy (RMAW), at Woolwich. Commissioned into the Royal Field Artillery in 1897, he served in the 2nd South African War ('the Boer War'). He gained the Queen's South Africa Medal (QSAM) with 4 clasps, but was also awarded a Mention in Despatches (MiD) and decorated with the Distinguished Service Order (DSO), despite also being wounded. From 1904-1912, Captain Nevill served in India, where he followed in family tradition by writing a book, the well-received: North-West Frontier (Campaigns: 1849-1908). By now a Major, and married, he returned to enter the Staff College at Camberley, passing out in 1914. On the outbreak of the Great War, Major Nevill joined his battery on the Western Front, taking part in the actions around Mons. He was again awarded a Mention in Despatches (MiD), and was again wounded in action. In 1915, he was posted to the staff of the new 10th (Irish) Division. This division would be directed to the Dardanelles Campaign, hoping to advance on Constantinople and defeat the Ottoman Empire, which had recently joined the Central Powers. Major Nevill, DSO, was killed on the first day of the Landing at Suvla Bay.{{}}

== Books ==
- K. D. Somadasa, Catalogue of the Hugh Nevill Collection, 7 vols. London, British Library Press and the Pali Text Society.
- Hugh Nevill, Sinhala Kavi ("Sinhalese Verse"). Edited by P. E. P. Deraniyagala.
