= Sri Lanka Portuguese Creole Manuscript =

Manuscript and corpus

The Sri Lanka Portuguese Creole Manuscript is a significant record of the Sri Lankan Indo-Portuguese creole, as spoken in the 19th century among the Burgher and Kaffir communities. It a precious source for linguistic, literary, anthropological, and folkloric studies.

The manuscript was collected by Hugh Nevill in the period 1865–1897, and is now at the British Library.

The manuscript contains 1,049 quatrains, divided into three sections:

- Portuguese Song Batticaloa (Burgher)
- Songs of the Portuguese Kaffrinha (Kaffir)
- The Story of Orson and Valentine

The story of Orson and Valentine was very popular in Europe. Variants of the story are found in 5th century Pali literature, and it is also an early play of Sinhalese theatre (Balasanta Nadagama).

The manuscript is written using a mix of Portuguese and Dutch orthography.
