= Indian diaspora in Africa =

Migration from India into Africa pre-dates European colonization. The number of Indians in Africa increased greatly with the settlement of Indians in Africa as indentured servants during colonization, and has continued to increase into the 21st century.

== Indian-African history ==
=== Trade migrations: precolonial Indo-African relations ===
India and Africa have over a three thousand-year history of cultural and commercial relations. Sources from India show evidence of trade and contact between the Dravidians and Babylonians dating back to the 7th century B.C. This evidence has been interpreted to understand Indian merchants and sailors having visited Southern Arabia, situated on the Eastern part of the Horn of Africa also known as the Somali peninsula.

Additionally, Indian coastal communities developed profitable ties with East Africa, East Asia, and Central Asia in pre-colonial times. The ‘trade diaspora’ was unique as it consisted largely of ‘temporary’ and ‘circular’ migration. Men were sent to look for trade elsewhere but expected to eventually return to their motherland. Traders linked other cultures to their own. Only in the nineteenth century did a considerable amount of South Asian trading communities settle abroad.

=== Indentured labor: forced migration into Africa ===
The second wave of migration into Africa by Indians came as a result of colonization. Major clusters of Indians were taken as indentured laborers across colonial empires in the nineteenth and early twentieth century. Indentured Indian laborers replaced freed enslaved Africans in plantation economies. The stark contrast between the first trade wave was that migration during colonial rule was forced, not voluntary. It is worth noting that some Indians migrated as clerks and teachers to serve colonial governments overseas. This expanded colonial rule. Estimates during the period of 1829-1924 suggest that about 769,427 Indians migrated out of India into Mauritius, South Africa, Seychelles, and the East African region.

In the midst of colonization, the sub-continent India and large masses of Africa were incorporated into the British Empire such as Sierra Leone and the most common example, South Africa. Indentured labor came as the result of bondage of debt. Through this, European imperialists facilitated the transport of over 3.5 million Indians into the African continent where they served as labor for plantations. A majority of these plantations grew sugar. Unlike indentured laborers before 1830, most indentured laborers post-1830 did not return into free labor markets. They were forced to renew contracts.

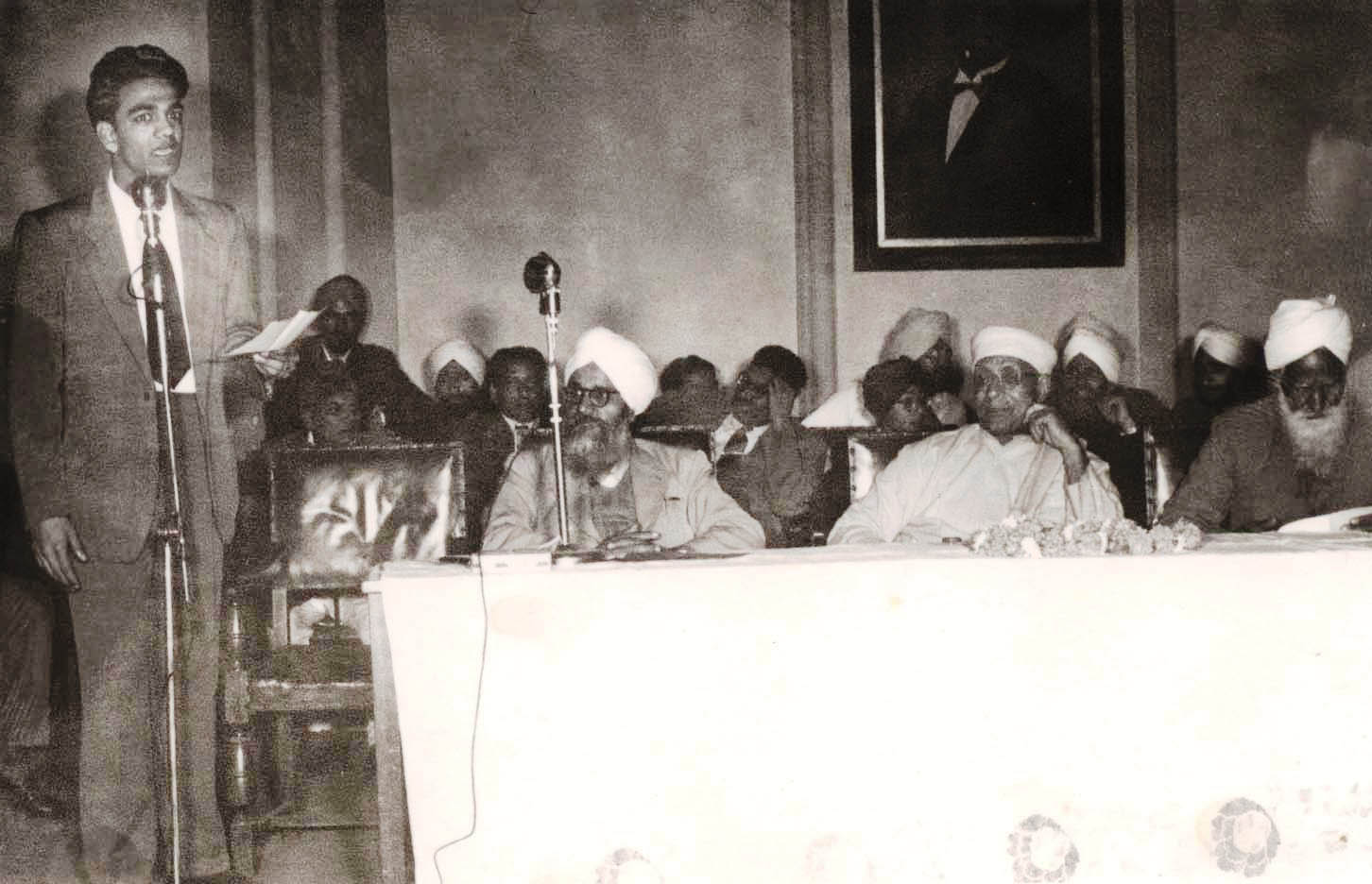
Chaman Lal Chaman (reading), Gopal Singh Chandan, Mahasha Khushal and Prem Singh Mastana Jogi in Nairobi in 1956.

Even as numerous sources account for the inhumane conditions of laborers, populations only grew. In Mauritius 1871, the Indian population doubled from 33% in 1846 to 66% of the total population within the state. Migration remained predominantly male until the mid-nineteenth century. States then started to encourage the forced migration of women, to meet growing demands for domestic, urban and plantation labor, and create a consistent population of indentured slaves directly into their economy.

With the rise of nationalism, the conversation around overseas Indians mobilized into the realization of discrimination across the colonies. The issue of Indentured labor festered the fight against British imperialism. At the same time, many Indians, including Mahadev Govind Ranad, the head of the ruling party in India (the Indian National Congress), believed that there was significant benefit in foreign Indian emigration as a solution to the multiplying population within India. Foreign in this thought, Indian emigration should be understood as synonymous with indentured servitude, which some argued ensured territorial expansion and provided opportunity for India's poor.

Mohandas Gandhi, of South Africa, worked to abolish indentured servitude starting with his meeting with Gopal Krishna Gokhale. See more; Mohandas Gandhi, South African Indian Diaspora

=== Post-independent India and African diaspora ===
Since decolonialization, many Indian immigrants have gravitated towards the Middle East, Northern America, and Western Europe at higher rates than African migration. Still, the opportunities in Africa have attracted Indian migrants. Many new migrants go to Africa on temporary work permits and do not seek permanent citizenship. Since the late 1990s, there has been a trend of Indian migrants migrating to Africa in pursuit of going further west.

There are a significant number of Indians who reach the African continent without legal documents. As a Kenyan magazine, The Analyst, reported, “While official figures show only 1918 work permits issued from the Asian subcontinent in a three year period – 1995 (731), 1996 (703), and 1997 (484) – unconfirmed reports state that between 30,000 to 40,000 immigrant workers from the Asian subcontinent have entered Kenya in the last four years”

Official records of the Government of India note the increasing presence of Indian communities in the African continent. In 2001, a released report by the High Level Committee on Indian Diaspora estimated the total Indian diaspora in Africa to be 2,063,178 (including 1,969,708 people of Indian origins, 89,405 non-resident Indians, and 3,500 stateless people. Indians of the diaspora were spread over 34 countries across the continent.

The most recent estimates on overseas Indians indicate the strength on the Indian diaspora on the continent to have risen to 27,106,545. Members of the Indian diaspora reside in 46 countries of Africa. Indians in Africa account for 12.37% of the total diaspora in India over time. The concentration of Indian diaspora populations varies substantially across the continent. In Mauritius, 70% of the total population are members of the Indian diaspora.

== Present effects ==
The large populations of Indians within Africa could be the cause of the political support Africa is seeing from India now. The previous Prime Minister of India, Manmohan Singh, recognized Africa as the growth pole of the world in 2011. Since this acknowledgement, India has shown their faith in Africa through the expansion of trade. In 2015, India's trade to Africa tripled from 24.98 billion (period of 2006-2007) to $72 billion. In return, Africa has backed the politics of India and allowed for new export markets from the nation.

== African diaspora in India ==
Along with Indians being displaced to Africa, many Africans also were displaced to India. There is a long-established history of the African Diaspora in India. As Indians were being brought to Africa as indentured laborers, the same was true inversely. Africans were brought as forced labor to India.

== See also ==
- Indo-African (disambiguation)
- Afro-Asians
- African Diaspora in India
- Mauritians of Indian origin
