= Portuguese Burghers =

Ethnic group in Sri Lanka

Total population
- 5,000

Regions with significant populations
- Sri Lanka, United Kingdom, Australia, New Zealand, Canada, USA

Languages
- Sri Lankan Portuguese Creole, Portuguese, English, Sinhala and Tamil

Religion
- Catholic and other Christian denominations

Related ethnic groups
- Luso-Asians, Luso-Indians, Burgher people, Portuguese, Dutch Burghers, Sinhalese, Kaffirs & Sri Lankan Tamils

The Portuguese Burghers are an ethnic group in Sri Lanka, of mixed Portuguese and Sri Lankan descent. They are largely Catholic and some still speak the Sri Lanka Indo-Portuguese language, a creole based on Portuguese mixed with Sinhalese. In modern times, English has become the common language while Sinhalese is taught in school as a second language. Portuguese Burghers sometimes mixed with but are to be distinguished from other Burgher people, such as Dutch Burghers.

== Origins ==
The Portuguese Burghers are largely descendants of the Sri Lanka Mestiços, the people of mixed Portuguese and Sri Lankan descent (commonly of a Portuguese father and a Sri Lankan mother) who appeared in the 16th century, after the Portuguese explorers found the sea route to the Indian Ocean.

In the 18th century, the Eurasian community (a mixture of Portuguese, Dutch, and Sinhalese as well as Tamil, known as the Burgher) grew, speaking Portuguese or Dutch. The Portuguese Burghers followed Catholicism and spoke a Portuguese creole, Sri Lanka Indo-Portuguese language. Despite their socio-economic disadvantage, these Burghers maintained their Portuguese cultural identity. In Batticaloa, the Catholic Burgher Union reinforced this. The Portuguese Creole also continued to be used amongst the Dutch Burghers families as the informal language until the end of the 19th century.

In today's Sri Lanka, the Creole is limited to the spoken form. Most of the speakers are the Burghers in the Eastern province (Batticaloa and Trincomalee). But there are also the Kaffirs (people of African origin) in the Northwestern province (Puttalam). The Portuguese, Dutch and British brought the Kaffirs to Sri Lanka, for labour purposes. They have assumed Portuguese culture and religion.

== Genetics ==
Phenotypically, Burghers can be either light-skinned or dark-skinned, depending on their ancestral history. It is common to find Burghers with dark- to light-brown skin (usually Portuguese Burghers or Kaffirs) with European facial features common to the Mediterranean basin (see Mediterraneans). In some Portuguese Burgher families, it is common to have both very dark children and children with fair skin. Most light-skinned Burghers are of Dutch or British descent.

== Current status ==
There are still 100 families in Batticaloa and Trincomalee and 80 Kaffir families in Puttalam that speak Sri Lanka Indo-Portuguese language; they have been out of contact with Portugal since 1656.
