= Dutch Burghers =

Ethnic group in Sri Lanka

Regions with significant populations
- Sri Lanka, United Kingdom, Australia, New Zealand, Canada, USA

Languages
- Sri Lankan Portuguese Creole, English, Sinhala, and Tamil; formerly Ceylon Creole Dutch

Religion
- Christianity

Related ethnic groups
- Burgher people, Portuguese, Portuguese Burghers, Sinhalese, Sri Lankan Tamils

The Dutch Burghers are an ethnic group in Sri Lanka, of mixed Dutch, Portuguese Burgher and Sri Lankan descent. However, they are a different community to the Portuguese Burghers. Originally an entirely Protestant community, many Burghers today remain Christian but belong to a variety of denominations. The Dutch Burghers of Sri Lanka speak English and the local languages Sinhala and Tamil.

Some Dutch Burghers on the East Coast in Batticaloa do not speak English as their first language but instead a Portuguese-Tamil creole that is still spoken in households. The reason for this is due to the original Dutch settlers there mixing heavily with Portuguese Burgher women centuries ago, hence resulting in Burghers with Dutch surnames (e.g., Barthelot) who speak Portuguese Creole.

== Origins ==
The Dutch Burghers largely descend from the Dutch people, with mixtures of Dutch and Sri Lankans (either a Dutch father and a Sri Lankan mother, or a Dutch father and a Portuguese Burgher mother; when a Dutch man marries a Sri Lankan woman, their children are Burgher). However, direct Dutch ancestry is not always the case. Many Dutch Burghers can also claim lineage from other European Protestants who moved to the Netherlands and joined the Dutch East India Company fleeing Catholicism. Hence, names from Germany, Switzerland, France, Italy and so forth are common (e.g., Schockman, Slemmermann, Piachaud, and Sansoni). However, some names have since become extinct (or are on the verge of extinction) in Sri Lanka due to migration following independence and Sinhala-only nationalist movements forbidding Burghers, whose vernacular language was English from continuing the jobs they had maintained prior to independence in the civil service etc.(e.g., Blaze, Leembruggen, Kellar).

In the 17th century, the Dutch East India Company took over coastal Ceylon (present-day Sri Lanka) from the Portuguese. During the Dutch East India Company rule, the Dutch and Portuguese descendants intermarried.

In the 18th century, the Eurasian community (a mixture of Portuguese, Dutch, Sinhalese and Tamil) known as the Burghers grew, speaking Portuguese or Dutch.

Burgher means "citizen" in Dutch, hence was originally used to differentiate the Dutch from the other Europeans in Ceylon. "Burgher" is now used to describe the Eurasians (of mixed European and Asian ancestry) from Sri Lanka.

Being hybrids themselves, Burghers assimilated into Sri Lankan society and have intermarried with Sinhalese and Tamils.

== Culture ==
The Burghers established their own culture and have contributed linguistically to the variety of Sri Lankan English. The Burgher sub-culture, and cuisine has been portrayed effectively through popular literature, notably Carl Muller's trilogy and Michael Ondaatje's Running in the Family.

== Current status ==
The advent of Sinhala Buddhist nationalism, many Burghers were confronted by their lack of status. Linguistically disadvantaged by the Sinhala Only Act, many Burghers lost their social status, employment and privileges.

A mass exodus ensued, where many migrated, Australia being the preferred destination.

At the 1981 Census, the Burghers (Dutch and Portuguese) numbered almost 40,000 (0.3% of the population of Sri Lanka). Many Burghers emigrated to other countries following nationalist movements and language revivals post-independence. With English being replaced by Sinhala, universities and jobs were no longer accessible to minorities like the Burghers who spoke English. While numbers of Burghers are placed at around 40,000 some argue that Burghers who still practice their original culture and customs have dwindled to about 15,000 mostly concentrated in Colombo.

Dutch Burghers' lifestyle is a mix of Sri Lankan and Western influence, and many embrace their heritage through participation in the Dutch Burgher Union.

== Diaspora ==
The Burgher population worldwide is approximated to be around 100,000, concentrated mostly in the United Kingdom, Canada, Australia and New Zealand.

A large community of Sri Lankans exists in Australia today, of which many are descendants of the migration over the last 50 years. Evident in the many Sri Lanka-Australia Associations, old boys’ and old girls’ school associations are maintained as a reaffirmation of their identity and wish to continue ties with their motherland, Sri Lanka.

== See also ==
- Burgher people
- Portuguese Burghers
