= Willem Jacob van de Graaf =

Politician

Willem Jacob van de Graaff
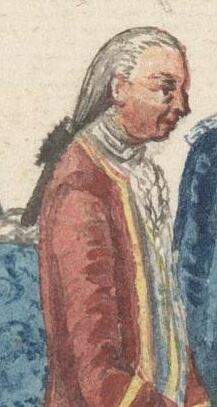

35th Governor of Dutch Ceylon
- In office 7 February 1785 – 15 July 1794
- Preceded by: Pierre André de Suffren de Saint Tropez
- Succeeded by: Johan Van Angelbeek

Personal details
- Died: 10 December 1804

Willem Jacob van de Graaff (28 May 1736 or 1737, in Huissen – 10 December 1804, in Utrecht) was the 35th Dutch governor of Ceylon during the Dutch period in Ceylon.

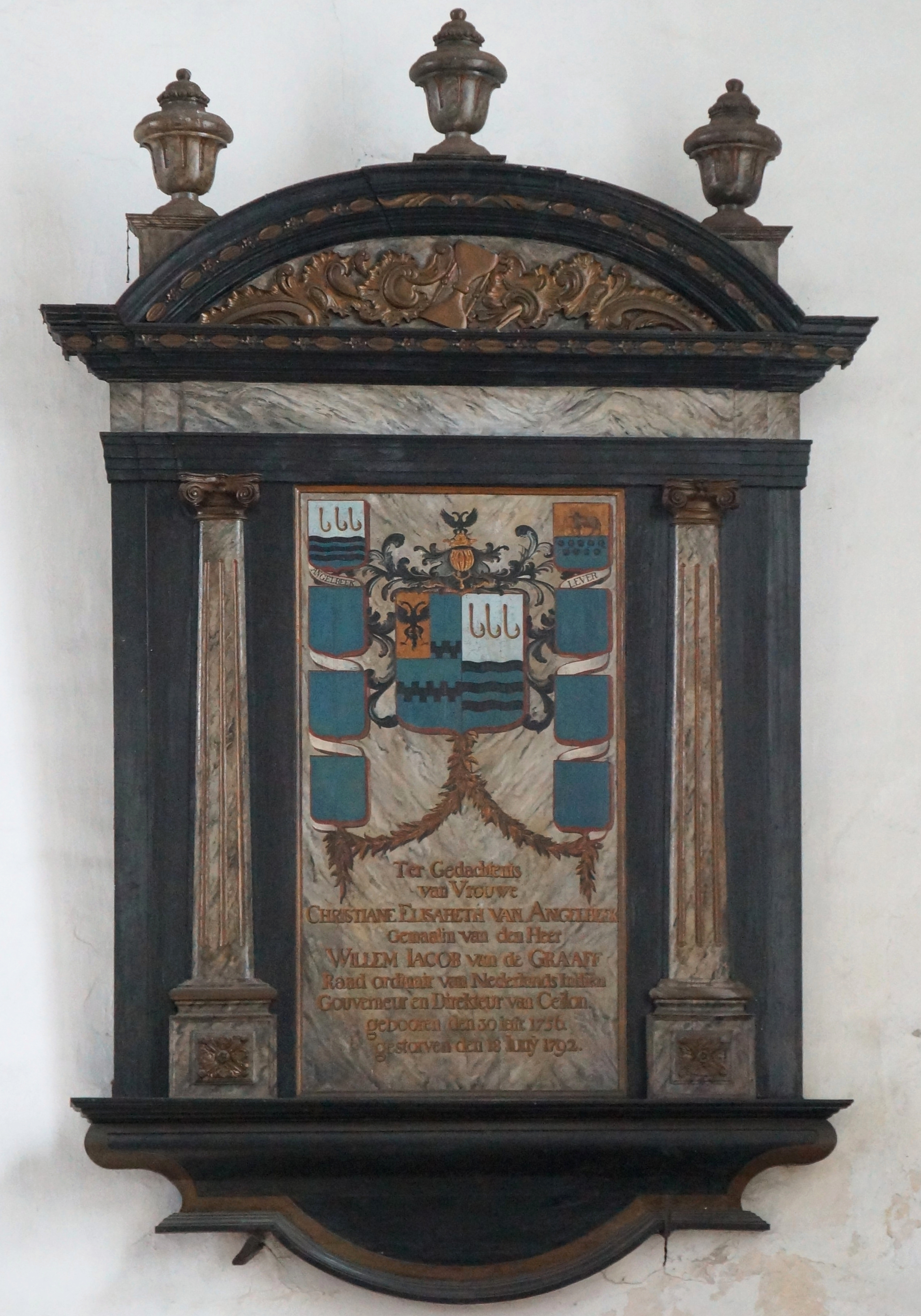
Ex voto en mémoire de Lady Christina Elisabeth Ange Heek épouse de William Jacob de Graaff, Colombo

Willem Jacob was the third child of Sebastiaan van de Graaf, Major of Cavalry in the Army of the United Provinces, and Geertruid van Vinceler. At the age of 18, Van de Graaf left on the ship Blijdorp for Ceylon, where he became a merchant in Galle. There, in 1762, he married Agnita Clara Samlant (1745–1773), the daughter of the Commander of Galle and Mat. They had five children. In 1766 he became "head of the Mahabadde" in Colombo, the civil servant in charge of the economically important cinnamon cultivation. After the death of his first wife, he married Christina Elisabeth van Angelbeek (1756–1792), with whom he had 11 children, two sons and one daughter of which survived childhood.

He was appointed Governor of Ceylon on 7 February 1785 until he was requested in 1793 to become first Counsellor and Director-General of the Dutch Settlement in India (in Suratte). On 15 July 1794 he was succeeded as governor by his father-in-law, Johan van Angelbeek. He retired to the estate De Liesbosch south of the city Utrecht, where he died in 1804.

Government offices
Preceded by Pierre André de Suffren de Saint Tropez	Governor of Zeylan; 1785–1794	Succeeded by Johan van Angelbeek
