= Burgher people =

Sri Lankan ethnic group

Burghers
Total population
- 52,481 (2012 census)

Regions with significant populations
- Province
- Western Province, Sri Lanka: 42,484
- Eastern Province, Sri Lanka: 4,458
- Central Province, Sri Lanka: 3,347
- North Western Province, Sri Lanka: 2,192

Languages
- Languages of Sri Lanka: Sinhala, English, Tamil, Sri Lankan Portuguese creole

Religion
- Christianity (Catholicism, Dutch Reformed, Anglicanism, other Christian denominations); and Buddhism

Related ethnic groups
- Portuguese; Dutch; British diaspora; Sinhalese; Sri Lankan Tamils; Sri Lankan Chetties; Sri Lanka Kaffirs

Burgher people, also known simply as Burghers, are a small Asian ethnic group in Sri Lanka descended from Portuguese, Dutch, British and other Europeans who settled in Ceylon. The Portuguese and Dutch had held some of the maritime provinces of the island for centuries before the advent of the British Empire. Burgher people are often referred to as belonging to one of two sub-groups, either Dutch Burghers or Portuguese Burghers, though both are of mixed descent.

Most of those who retained close ties with the Netherlands departed with the establishment of British Ceylon as a crown colony at the end of the 18th century. However, a significant community of Burghers remained and largely adopted the English language. During British rule, they occupied a highly important place in Sri Lankan social and economic life. Portuguese settlers were mostly traders who formed colonies. Lisbon did not discourage European settlement—even to the extent of advocating intermarriage with the Sinhalese. This was not encouraged by the Sinhalese. It was not the policy of the Dutch East India Company to endorse similar unions, although unofficial liaisons between its employees and local women occurred in the late eighteenth century.

Burghers may vary from generation to generation in physical characteristics; some intermarried with the British and produced descendants with predominantly European or mixed phenotypes, including fairer skin and lighter coloured eyes, while others were almost indistinguishable from Sinhalese or Tamils. Most Burgher people have preserved European customs, especially those of Portuguese ancestry, who "retained their European religion and language with pride."

== Legal definition ==
The Burghers were legally defined in 1883 by the Chief Justice of Ceylon, Sir Richard Ottley, given before the Commission, appointed in connection with the establishment of a legislative council in Ceylon. Burghers were defined as those whose father was born in Ceylon, with at least one European ancestor on one's direct paternal side, regardless of the ethnic origin of one's mother, or what other ethnic groups may be found on the father's side. Because of this definition, Burghers almost always have European surnames (mostly of Portuguese, Dutch and British origin, but sometimes German, French or Russian).

== History ==
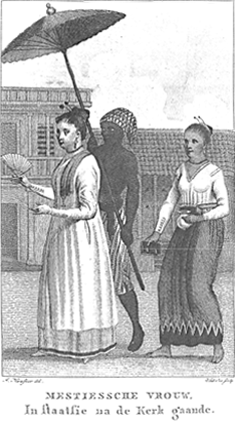
A Burgher woman and her two servants, late-18th century illustration

The Portuguese arrived in 1505 in what Europeans then called Ceylon. Since there were no women in the Portuguese navy, the Portuguese sailors married local Sinhalese and Tamil women. This practice was encouraged by the Portuguese.

The Dutch first made contact and signed a trade agreement with the Kingdom of Kandy in 1602. From 1640, the Dutch East India Company (VOC) ('Vereenigde Oost-Indische Compagnie' or United East India Company) had a governor installed and conquered more and more forts from the Portuguese, until, in 1658, the last Portuguese were expelled. However, they permitted a few stateless persons of Portuguese-Jewish (Marrano) descent, and of mixed Portuguese-Sinhalese ancestry to stay. Many people having a Portuguese name were a result of forced conversions of local/native people to work for the Portuguese. As a result, Burghers with Portuguese names are most likely to be of Sinhalese ancestry, with a very small portion being Portuguese or mixed Portuguese-Sinhalese ancestry. Those of a Portuguese-Jewish background can be traced in various forms or surmised from their surname. Most Burghers of Eurasian descent with Portuguese surnames are of Sinhalese and Dutch, British, German and/or other European descent.

During the Dutch period, all Dutch colonial operations were overseen by the VOC. Virtually all Burghers from this period were employees of the VOC. The VOC employed not only Dutch nationals but also enlisted men from the Southern Netherlands, the German states and Denmark. It is therefore not unusual to find ancestors from these countries in many Dutch Burgher family trees.

The term 'Burgher' comes from the Dutch word burger, meaning "citizen" or "town dweller", and is cognate with the French "bourgeois" and the English word "burgess". At this time in Europe, there had emerged a middle class, consisting of people who were neither aristocrats nor serfs. These were the traders and businessmen, who lived in towns and were considered free citizens. In Europe, they were called burghers, and they were encouraged to migrate to the colonies to expand business horizons.

Dutch Ceylon had two classes of people of European descent: those who were paid by the VOC and were referred to as Company servants (i.e. employees), and those who had migrated of their own free will. The latter were not referred to as burghers in Ceylon, but rather by their rank, position or standing.

During the period of British rule, they were referred to by the British as 'Dutch Burghers' and formed the majority of the European-descended populace residing in Ceylon. The 'Dutch Burgher' community took pride in its achievements and prized their European ancestry. Several Dutch Burgher Union journals have been created over some time, to record family histories. They were not only of Dutch origin as other European origins were apparent (German, Hungarian, Italian, French, Swedish, British, and Portuguese) and Sinhalese lines.

When the British took over in 1796, many VOC employees chose to leave. However, a significant number chose to stay, mostly those of mixed descent. Some chose to go to Batavia, which was the headquarters of the VOC. Reportedly about 900 families, both free citizens and Dutch East India Company employees, decided to remain in Ceylon. One condition of them being allowed to stay was that they had to sign a treaty of capitulation, which guaranteed they would remain loyal and not defect if the Dutch attempted to re-conquer Ceylon. Every Burgher remaining in Ceylon signed the treaty, which is commonly used by their descendants to trace their lineage. In 1796, the 900 'Dutch Burgher' families residing in Ceylon were concentrated in Colombo, Galle, Matara and Jaffna.

The Burghers included members of the Swiss de Meuron Regiment, a Swiss mercenary unit employed by the VOC. In diplomatic negotiations in Europe, Count de Meuron pledged allegiance to the British in exchange for back pay and military information. This allowed the British to get detailed fortification information and reduce the garrison size of Ceylon before 1796. The de Meuron Regiment refused to fight the Dutch due to relationships forged on the island of Ceylon and South Africa with the British. Post-1796 members of the de Meuron Regiment stayed in Ceylon, whilst the regiment itself went off to fight and distinguish itself in India and later in Canada.

== Society ==
=== Demographics ===
Historical population
Year	Pop.	±%
1881	17,900	—
1891	21,200	+18.4%
1901	23,500	+10.8%
1911	26,700	+13.6%
1921	29,400	+10.1%
1931	32,300	+9.9%
1946	41,900	+29.7%
1953	46,000	+9.8%
1963	45,900	−0.2%
1971	45,400	−1.1%
1981	39,400	−13.2%
1989 (est.)	42,000	+6.6%
2001	35,300	−16.0%
2011	37,061	+5.0%
Source: Department of Census & Statistics, Sri Lanka; Data is based on the Sri Lankan Government Census.

In the census of 1981, the Burgher population of Sri Lanka was 39,374 persons, about 0.2% of the total population. The highest concentration of Burghers is in Colombo (0.72%) and Gampaha (0.5%). There are also significant communities in Trincomalee and Batticaloa, with an estimated population of 20,000.

Burgher descendants are spread throughout the world. Families with surnames such as Van Dort (or the variant Vandort) are of Dutch ancestry.

=== Language ===
Percentage of burghers per district based on 2001 or 1981 (cursive) census.

Nowadays, Burgher people predominantly speak Sinhala. Until the early 20th century, many Burghers spoke English and Sri Lankan Portuguese creole, even those of Dutch descent. Portuguese Creole had been the language of trade and communication with Sri Lankans. It is now spoken only in parts of the coastal towns of Trincomalee and Batticaloa. While much vocabulary is from Portuguese, its grammar is based on that of Tamil and Sinhala.

Depending on where they live in Sri Lanka, Burghers may also additionally speak English and or Tamil. According to the 2012 Census, 73.6% or 24,412 Burghers also spoke English and 38.4% or 12,738 Burghers also spoke Tamil.

== Culture ==
Burgher culture is a mixture of East and West, reflecting their ancestry. They are the most Europeanised of the ethnic groups in Sri Lanka. Most of them wear modern contemporary clothing, although it is not uncommon for a man to be seen wearing a sarong, or for a woman to wear a sari.

Several elements in Burgher culture have become part of the cultures of other ethnic groups in Sri Lanka. For example, baila music, which has its origin in the music of 16th-century Portugal, has found its way into mainstream popular Sinhalese music. Lacemaking, which began as a domestic pastime of Burgher women, is now a part of Sinhalese culture too. Foods such as love cake, breudher, bol fiado (layered cake), ijzer koekjes (iron cookies), frikkadels (savoury meatballs) and lamprais, have become an integral part of Sri Lankan national cuisine.

Burghers are not physically homogeneous. Some are blond, white-skinned, and pale, some have a very dark complexion and black hair, with variations between. Pale-skinned and dark-skinned children may be in the same family of the same parents. Burghers share a common culture rather than a common ethnicity.

Burghers have a very strong interest in their family histories. Many old Burgher families kept stamboeken (from the Dutch for "clan books"). These recorded not only dates of births, marriages and deaths, but also significant events in the history of a family, such as details of moving house, illnesses, school records, and even major family disputes. An extensive, multi-volume stamboek of many family lineages is kept by the Dutch Burgher Union.

Individual families often have indigenous European traditions reflecting their specific family origins. Burghers of Dutch origin sometimes celebrate the Feast of Saint Nicholas in December, and those of Portuguese-Jewish origin observe customs such as the separation time of a woman after childbirth (see Leviticus 12:2-5), the redemption of the Firstborn (Pidyon ha-Ben), and the purification bath (taharah) after a daughter’s first period (see niddah). Most of the latter Burgher families, being unaware of the Jewish origins of these customs, have given them a Catholic slant. (Catholic and Episcopal churches had services for the churching of women after childbirth from ancient times.)

However, some traditions attributed to Judaism can also be explained as borrowings or retention from the Tamil and Sinhalese communities with whom many Burgher families also share ancestry and culture. For example, the purification bath after a girl’s first period is a common cultural feature of the Tamil and Sinhalese communities of Sri Lanka and neighbouring India. Hence its prevalence amongst some Burghers families of Sri Lanka is not necessarily of Jewish origins.

Some commentators believe that the Burghers’ mixed backgrounds have made their culture more tolerant and open. While inter-communal strife has been a feature of modern Sri Lankan life, some Burghers have worked to maintain good relations with other ethnic groups.

In 2001, the Burghers established a heritage association, the Burgher Association, with headquarters at Union Place, Colombo.

== See also ==
- Anglo-Indian
- Anglo-Burmese people
- Baster
- Cape Coloured
- Coloured
- Dutch Burgher Union of Ceylon
- Indo people
- List of notable Burgher people
- Mestiços (Sri Lanka)

== Bibliography ==
- Bosma, Ulbe; Raben, Remco (2008). "Separation and Fusion". Being "Dutch" in the Indies: A History of Creolisation and Empire, 1500–1920. NUS Press. pp. 1–25. ISBN 978-9971-69-373-2.
