= Vandort =

Vandort is a surname. Notable people with the surname include:

- Michael Vandort (born 1980), Sri Lankan cricketer
- Rebeca Vandort (born 1994), Sri Lankan cricketer

== See also ==
- Van Dort
