= Johan van Angelbeek =

Dutch colonial officer (1727–1799)

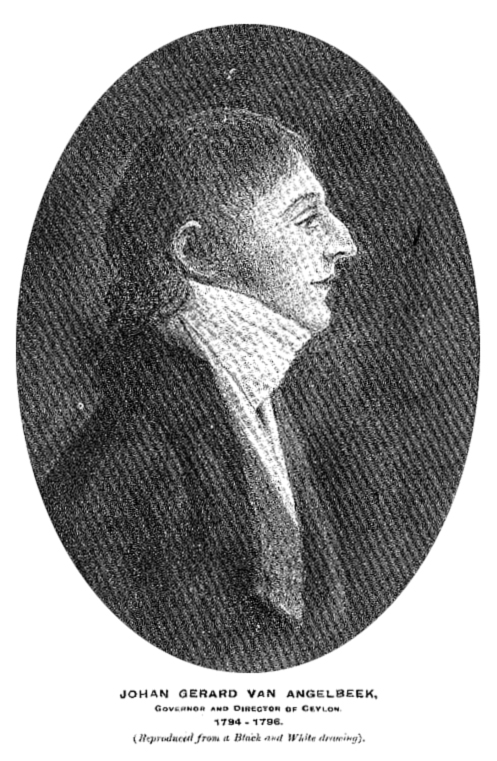
- Drawing of van Angelbeek from the Journal of the Dutch Burgher Union of Ceylon, 1916

Governor of Dutch India
- In office 1787–1794

36th Governor of Ceylon
- In office 15 July 1794 – 16 February 1796
- Preceded by: Willem Jacob van de Graaf
- Succeeded by: Post abolished Succeeded by British governors of Ceylon

Personal details
- Born: 1727 Wittmund, East Frisia, Holy Roman Empire
- Died: 2 September 1799 (aged 72) Colombo, Ceylon
- Spouse: Jacomina Lever
- Children: Christina Elizabeth van Angelbeek, Christiaan van Angelbeek

Johan Gerard van Angelbeek (1727 – 2 September 1799) was a Dutch colonial officer who commanded Dutch forces on the island of Ceylon during the colony's final year in the Dutch Empire before its seizure by a British expeditionary force.

Van Angelbeek was born in East Frisia in 1727 and in 1751 left the Netherlands for the East, in the ship Schakenbos, travelling to India and Batavia and returning to the Netherlands in 1755. In 1756, he joined the Dutch East India Company returning to the Indian Ocean and serving as a merchant at Batavia and in Bengal. In 1764 he took an official position in the capital of Dutch Ceylon at Colombo and in 1767 moved to the port of Tuticorin in India, serving as Koopman and eventually becoming senior official of the port in 1770, retaining the position until 1783.

In 1783, Van Angelbeek was made governor of Malabar, and in 1787 was appointed as the governor of all Dutch India. In 1794, during the French Revolutionary Wars, Van Angelbeek took command of the Dutch colony of Ceylon, and was in command when a British expeditionary force arrived the following year. Most of the Dutch ports fell rapidly, Colombo the last to surrender in February 1796. He remained in Colombo during the British occupation, dying in 1799. He was the last Dutch governor of the colony as the British retained it for 152 years. He was married to Jacomina Lever and had two children, both his son Christian and his son-in-law Willem Jacob van de Graaf, husband of his daughter Christina Elisabeth van Angelbeek, were prominent in the administration of the Dutch Indian Ocean colonies.

Government offices
Preceded by Willem Jacob van de Graaf	Governor of Dutch Ceylon; 1787–1794	Succeeded by Post abolished Succeeded by British governors of Ceylon
