= Van Dort =

Van Dort is a Dutch surname. Notable people with the surname include:

- J. L. K. van Dort (1831–1891), 19th-century Ceylonese Burgher artist
- Joop van Dort (1889–1967), Dutch footballer
- Liz Van Dort, Australian singer
- Sharina van Dort (born 1988), Dutch handball player
- Wieteke van Dort (1943-2024), Dutch actor, singer and comedian

== See also ==
- Vandort
