= Kandyan Treaty of 1638 =

1638 treaty between Kandy and the Dutch Republic

The Kandyan Treaty of 1638, also known as the Westerwolt Treaty, was a treaty between the Kingdom of Kandy and the Dutch Republic signed by King Rajasinghe II and Dutch Naval Commander Adam van Westerwolt and Vice Commander Willem Jacobszoon Coster of the Dutch East India Company. The treaty was signed on 23 May, 1638 in Batticaloa. The treaty secured the terms under which the two nations would cooperate in defending the Kandyan Kingdom from the Portuguese.

== Background ==
King Rajasinghe II claimed the title Emperor of all-Ceylon, but in actuality only controlled a third of the island, with the Portuguese controlling the rest. He sought to strengthen his own rule, which was being threatened by his brother, and eventually evict Portugal from the island. The Dutch sought to control the trade of cinnamon from Ceylon, which grew primarily in the Portuguese controlled areas of the island. The Dutch believed that a parallel existed between Rajasinghe III and Abbas the Great, and that supporting Kandy would lead to successes similar to the Anglo-Persian capture of Hormuz.

== Content ==
The treaty comprised 19 articles and an additional supplementary clause, written in both Dutch and Portuguese.

- Article 1 established the friendship between the Dutch and Kandy.
- Article 2 concerned the fair divisions of loot from captured fortresses.
- Articles 3 to 5 concerned the garrisoning of captured fortresses.
- Article 6 gave the power to take decisions regarding the war with the Dutch.
- Article 7 required that the King of Kandy construct boats.
- Article 8 required that the King of Kandy pay the costs of all military aid, paid for with shipments of pepper, indigo, wax, rice, and cinnamon.
- Article 11 required the King of Kandy send at least one shipload of cinnamon, and other goods, to Batavia every year.
