= Afro-Asians in South Asia =

Ethnic groups on the Indian subcontinent

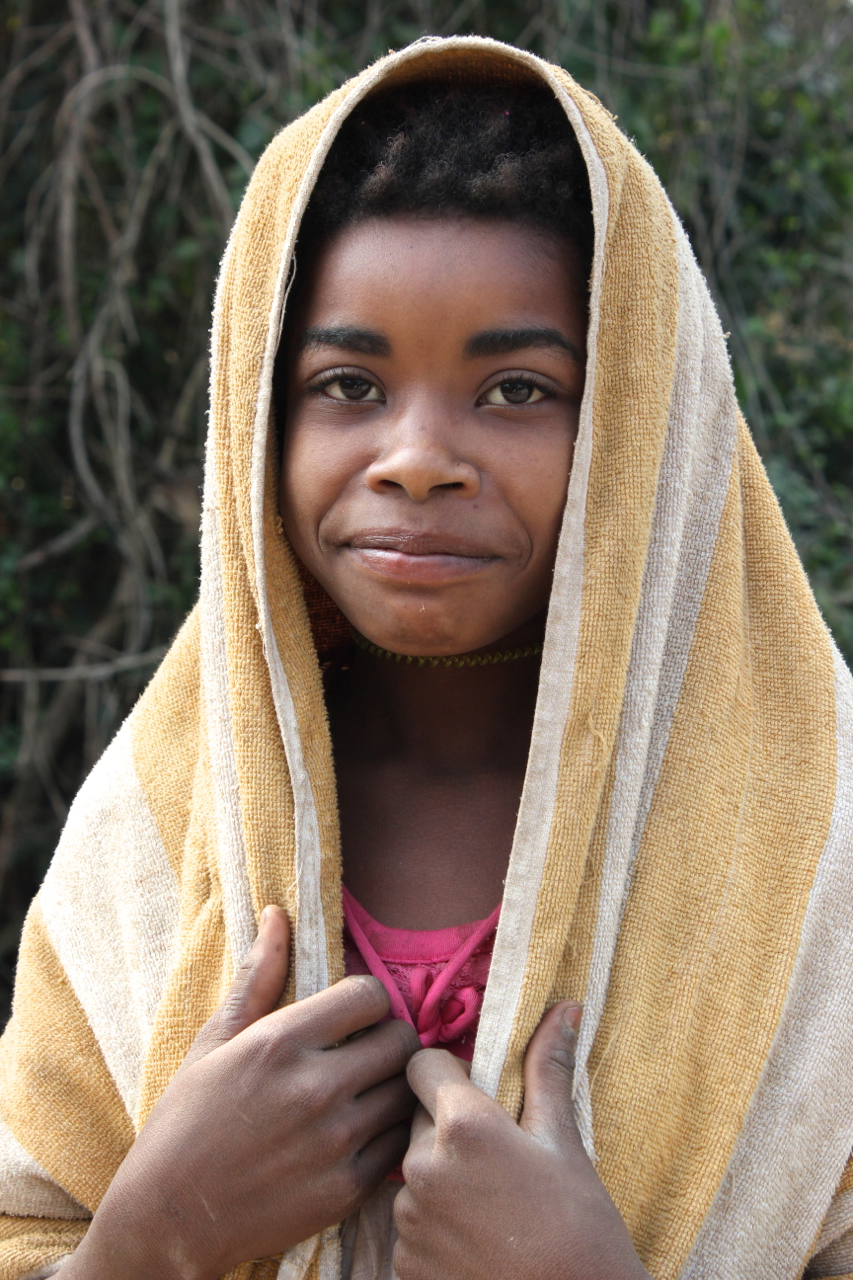
A Siddi girl in Gujarat, India

Afro-Asians (or African Asians) in South Asia are African communities that have been living on the Indian subcontinent for centuries and have settled in countries such as India, Pakistan, and Sri Lanka. This includes the Siddis (who have been living in India and Pakistan for over a thousand years) and Kaffirs in Sri Lanka.

== East African slave trade ==
The slave trade in Asia predates the Atlantic slave trade. The first Siddis were brought as slaves by Arab traders to India in 628 AD at the Bharuch port.

Siddis were also brought as slaves by the Deccan Sultanates. Several former slaves rose to high ranks in the military and administration, the most prominent of which was Malik Ambar.

A few Bantu peoples from Southeast Africa were also imported to the Indian subcontinent in the 16th century as household slaves by the Portuguese. Most of these Africans escaped the Portuguese control, choosing to remain Muslim rather than convert to Catholicism, as Islam was prohibited in Portuguese territories. A minority of the escaped slaves adopted Hinduism due to the predominant Hindu population The Nizam of Hyderabad also employed African-origin guards and soldiers.

In the 17th century, a struggle for imperialism emerged among the British, French, and Dutch. The French and Dutch relied on slave labor for plantations and agriculture, respectively, while the British relied on slaves for their navy, marine yards, and as caulkers in the East India Company. This competition for dominance in the region culminated in British supremacy, which endured until the 19th century.

=== Conditions for Afro-Asian slaves ===
Although slavery in India was oppressive and brutal, with slaves often subjected to flogging and forced labor under harsh conditions with minimal food, some individuals managed to attain wealth and influence, especially during the Muslim era.

As slaves, the Sheedi were allowed some degree of social mobility that allowed them to rise to prominent positions within the military and governing bodies. Muslim slaves were also afforded opportunities for education, marriage, serving as political advisers, and recruiting other slaves through methods such as purchase, inducements, or capture.

=== Abolition of slavery ===
By the 19th century, the British had abolished the slave trade but efforts by the British in the Indian subcontinent and other European imperialists were made to circumvent this. However, across all eras, there was a steady demand for personal slaves employed as domestic helpers. They were seen as indicators of high social status. The economic situation of the people determined the demand for slaves and was the underlying factor in the nature of slavery that developed in the Indian Subcontinent.

During the era of British and other European imperialism and colonialism, the Afro-Asians became further marginalised as the imperialists brought in attitudes about race into a complicated social and class system. Many of the Afro-Asians were systematically divided into settlements so that they could not politically organise. Instead, they were encouraged to assimilate.

== Assimilation and acculturation ==
Due to the type of slavery that encouraged assimilation, many Afro-Asians assimilated into the mainstream culture of British India and adopted the language, religion, names, and rituals of the surrounding cultures. The formerly enslaved adopted the culture of their former slave masters (both Indian and British).

Many Sheedis still retain some of their African traditions. Many Sheedis are either Muslim (mainly in Pakistan) or Hindu (mainly in India). A minority are Christian (both Protestant and Catholic).

In recent years, after the World Conference Against Racism in Durban South Africa, many have tried to organise politically so that they can improve their poor economic conditions.

== Afro-Asian diaspora ==
=== India ===
The Siddis constitute the largest settlement of slave descendants in India, with many having established communities along the western coast and hinterland in cities such as Janjira, Gujarat, and Goa. Presently, it is estimated that there are approximately 6,000-7,000 Siddis in Gujarat, India, and 400 in Mumbai.

=== Pakistan ===
Pakistani African descents consist of the "Makrani", "Sheedi" or "Habshi". The Makrani (Urdu/Persian: مکرانی) are the inhabitants of Makran coast of Balochistan in Pakistan and in Sindh the African descent people are called "Sheedi" and "Dada" the later is used as an respective term for them. The Sheedi in Karachi live in the area of Lyari and in Badin and in nearby coastal areas. Although most people use the term Sheedi to describe many of the African populations in Pakistan, they are not all Sheedis.

The Sheedis are divided into four clans or houses: Kharadar Makan, Hyderabad Makan, Lassi Makan and Belaro Makan. The Sufi saint Pir Mangho is regarded by many as the patron saint of the Sheedis and the annual Sheedi Mela festival, is the key event in the Sheedi community's cultural calendar. Some glimpses of the rituals at Sheedi Festival 2010 include visit to sacred alligators at Mangho pir, playing music and dance.

==== African identity ====
Many of Afro-Pakistanis are described to have "assimilated" themselves into the "dominant culture". The Sheedis have assimilated into Pakistani Baloch culture; the instrument, songs and dance of the Sheedis appear to be derived from Africa. Linguistically, Makranis are Balochi and Sindhi. Their local culture has been influential in shaping the dominant culture of Pakistan. The musical anthem of the ruling Pakistan Peoples Party, Bija Teer, is a Balochi song in the musical style of the Sheedis with African style rhythm and drums.

=== Sri Lanka ===
The Sri Lankan Kaffirs (cafrinhas in Portuguese, rendered as kāpiriyō (කාපිරි) in Sinhala and kāpili (காப்பிலி) in Tamil), are a Sri Lankan community that emerged in the 16th-century due to Portuguese colonialism.

==== Imperialism ====
When Dutch colonialists arrived around 1600, the Kaffirs worked on cinnamon plantations along the southern coast. The ancestors of the Kaffirs were chained and forced by the Dutch to serve in the Sinhalese Kingdom. Following the successful repulsion of the Dutch by the Sinhalese in 1796, the Kaffirs faced further marginalization due to an influx of Indian laborers brought in by the British, who predominantly took up roles on tea and rubber estates. The descendants of the original Africans, known as Kaffirs, continue to exist in isolated communities along the coastal regions of Trincomalee, Batticaloa, and Negombo on the island.

==== African identity ====
Sri Lankans of African descent take pride in their Sri Lankan identity while also recognizing their African heritage. Kaffirs have an orally recorded history by the families who are descendants of former Sinhalese slave traders. A significant portion of Sri Lankans of African descent are believed to trace their roots back to the region that is now the Republic of Mozambique. The community's traditional dance and music performances are considered the most prominent expressions of their cultural heritage and their commitment to preserving Africa's ancient traditions of religion, culture, and civilization. The term "Kaffir," which means "non-believer" in Arabic, is used within the community; however, in Sri Lanka, it lacks the derogatory connotations associated with the term in other countries like South Africa. Some Sri Lankans defend its usage, emphasizing that it is not intended as a racial slur.

Many Sri Lankans of African descent speak what has been described as a "creole" mixture of both the Sinhalese and Tamil languages. The community of Sri Lankans of African descent are also described as having been "assimilated" over the years as they have married Tamils and Sinhalese Sri Lankans.

==== Afro-Sri Lankans today ====
The education level of the community is consistent with that of rural Sri Lankan populations. They have become dis-empowered (they were used as soldiers by the Europeans) since the European colonizers have left the island and have tried to find their role in Sri Lankan society.

== See also ==
- Afro-Asians
- Afro-Arab
- Afro-Indians
- Afro-Iranians
- African Pakistani
- Afro-Turks
- Marabou (ethnicity)
- Swahili coast
