= Sri Lankan Portuguese creole =

Portuguese-based creole spoken in Sri Lanka

Sri Lankan Portuguese Creole
- Native to: Sri Lanka
- Ethnicity: Burghers
- Native speakers: 2,220 (2011)
- Language family: Portuguese Creole: Indo-Portuguese Creoles; Sri Lankan Portuguese Creole

Language codes
- ISO 639-3: –
- Glottolog: mala1544 Malabar–Sri Lanka Portuguese
- Linguasphere: 51-AAC-age
- IETF: idb-LK

Sri Lankan Indo-Portuguese, Ceylonese Portuguese Creole or Sri Lankan Portuguese Creole (SLPC) is a language spoken in Sri Lanka. While the predominant languages of the island are Sinhala and Tamil, the interaction of the Portuguese and the Sri Lankans led to the evolution of a new language, Sri Lanka Portuguese Creole (SLPC), which flourished as a lingua franca on the island for over 350 years (16th to mid-19th centuries). SLPC continues to be spoken by an unknown number of Sri Lankans, estimated to be extremely small.

All speakers of SLPC are members of the Burgher community, who are descendants of the Portuguese and Dutch who founded families in Sri Lanka. Europeans, Eurasians and Burghers account for 0.2% of the Sri Lankan population. Though only a small group of people actually continue to speak SLPC, Portuguese cultural traditions are still in wide practice by many Sri Lankans who are neither of Portuguese descent nor Roman Catholics.

SLPC is associated with the Mestiço (Casado) people, an ethnic minority group. SLPC has been considered the most important creole dialect in Asia because of its vitality and the influence of its vocabulary on the Sinhalese language. Lexical borrowing from Portuguese can be observed in many areas of the Sinhalese language. Portuguese influence has been so deeply absorbed into daily Sri Lankan life and behavior that these traditions will likely continue.

== History ==
In 1517, the Portuguese, attracted by the island's spices and strategic position (midway between their holdings on the west coast of India and Malacca), sent an expedition from Goa to establish a trading post at Colombo. They introduced Christianity to the island, and granted special favors to those who converted. Using the unstable political situation on the island to their advantage, the Portuguese soon gained the position of guardians of the nominal monarch of southern Sri Lanka. In 1557, Dharmapala, who was the king at Kotte, near Colombo, and had suzerainty over Kandy was baptized Dom João Dharmapala breaking a 1,850-year-old tradition as a Christian king sat on the Sinhalese throne. Several Sri Lankan aristocrats and others followed the King and converted. In 1597, Dharmapala, the last king of the Kotte, died childless, and willed his realm to Philip I, king of Portugal. In 1619, with the annexation of Jaffna, Portuguese authority extended over the entire lowland zone. Catholicism continued to spread, but the Portuguese did not train an indigenous clergy, so it was simply a microcosm of the church in Portugal.

The Dutch were in contact with the Kandyan court as early as 1602, but it wasn't until 1632 that the Kandyan monarch, Raja Sinha II, invited Dutch cooperation in expelling the Portuguese from the island. A long period of conflict ensued, including the Dutch takeover of Batticaloa in 1638, and ending with the fall of Mannar and Jaffna in 1658. When Raja Sinha II realized that the Dutch were not about to deliver their new conquests to him, the alliance quickly dissolved into enmity. The Dutch East India Company was primarily interested in commercial profits and resisted engaging in costly military operations against Kandy. During the Dutch reign, 1761–1766, was the only period of outright war. The Dutch also maltreated the Catholics and forced conversions to the Calvinist faith, the Catholic Church fell to its foundations as Catholic marriages, practice of the faith, and priests were forbidden by the Dutch. Catholics met secretly at each other's homes to practice their faith. At this time, the Catholic Church may have disappeared completely in Sri Lanka had it not been for the work of Goan priests who came to the island to save Catholicism.

== Origin ==
The Portuguese reached India in 1498, before coming to Sri Lanka in 1505. By that time a distinct pidgin of Portuguese had probably begun to develop, and this was used as the basis for communication with the new territory's inhabitants. There is very little documented evidence of the linguistic situation at the time, however, it is clear that by the early 17th century a Portuguese-based pidgin was in use in the Portuguese controlled littoral, and was not unknown in the kingdom of Kandy because of its frequent dealings with outsiders. Also, a creole community had been established consisting of two groups or creole speakers: the Topazes (Tupasses, mestiços, etc.), "dark-skinned or half-cast people claiming Portuguese descent, and Christian profession, and Kaffirs (Caffres, etc.), or Bantus".

The Topazes were children of local or half-caste mothers and Portuguese or half-caste fathers. They would have been exposed to pidgin/creole Portuguese at home. They identified with Portuguese, a natural occurrence, considering that the Portuguese were at the apex of the social order, though they probably had local family ties as well. The Portuguese brought a small number of Bantu slaves (Kaffirs) to Sri Lanka from the eastern African Great Lakes region. These people would have spoken pidgin Portuguese, and it is likely that many were native creole speakers, but maybe not of the Sri Lanka variety. Because they mainly served as domestic servants, they would have introduced the very young children of Casados (married men who had come with their Portuguese wives as settlers to Sri Lanka) to the pidgin/creole. There may have also been children of chance unions of Portuguese or Topazes with Kaffirs, but it is unclear which group they would have belonged to.

Sri Lanka was a Dutch colony from 1658 to 1796. During this time there was Dutch influence on the language, and possibly the development of a Portuguese–Dutch Creole. There may still be a few speakers of this in Wattala, a suburb of Colombo. However, the majority of Dutch Burghers spoke Dutch, Portuguese, English, or Portuguese Creole.

== Current use ==
Today, the language is spoken by descendants of Topazes and Mestiços, the Portuguese Burgher community, in the Eastern towns of Batticaloa (Koolavaddy, Mamangam, Uppodai, Dutch Bar, Akkaraipattu) and Trincomalee (Palayuttu). However, there are also speakers among the remaining Kaffirs, descendants of Bantu slaves, in the Northwestern province, in Puttalam and in Mannar. Additionally, in the village of Wahakotte near Galewala, in central Sri Lanka, there is a small community of Catholics with partial Portuguese ancestry, where the language was spoken until two generations ago.

Batticaloa is a medium-sized coastal town in the Eastern Province that has always been an isolated outpost, and has been able to retain many ancient habits. This isolation has been a factor in the preservation of SLPC, but very little information exists about the town's history. Tamil speakers are the overwhelming majority, but there is also a concentrated community of SLPC speaking Burghers. In the early part of the century most Burghers lived close to the center of the town, but more recently, many have moved to outlying areas. All of the Burghers in Batticaloa speak Tamil, many of them better than they do SLPC, and some also speak Sinhala and/or English. The group has no contact with any other creole speakers on the island, and the creole has for a long time been losing ground to Tamil. Currently, decreasing competence can be observed over successive generations: the younger a Burgher, the less likely they are to know the creole, and if they can speak it, their speech exhibits more Tamil features than that of their parents. Members of the burgher community are in constant interaction with Tamil speakers as they live, work, play, study, and worship together. Burgher children learn Tamil at the same time that they learn the creole. It is difficult to determine how many of Batticaloa's Burghers speak SLPC, but most probably understand it, though in many homes Tamil has become the predominant language.

The language is facing extinction, as it is now only used at home and few are able to speak it well. Throughout Sri Lanka many SLPC speakers have emigrated to other countries such as Australia, New Zealand, Canada, United States and Europe. There are still 100 Burgher families in Batticaloa and Trincomalee and 80 Kaffir families in Puttalam that speak the language. SLPC was very prominent in the past, continuing to be in use despite predictions that it would die out, but current prospects for its survival are equally as bleak as in the past.

An early sample of the language was collected by Hugh Nevill, a British civil servant stationed in Sri Lanka in the late 19th century. Among his large collection of oriental manuscripts is the Sri Lanka Portuguese Creole Manuscript, containing over a thousand verses and a long text in prose.

== Phonology and phonetics ==
Precise phonological knowledge of the Sri Lankan Portuguese Creole (SLPC) is limited. The earliest analysis of the language comes from the 19th and early 20th centuries, but since the research was based purely on written data, it lacks insight on how speech was actually produced. The only complete study that includes phonological analysis of native speakers seems to be Ian R Smith's thesis which was published in 1978. His research surveyed the Creole-speaking people living in the Batticaloa area of Sri Lanka. It can be assumed, unless otherwise indicated, that the phonological information about SLPC in the section on vowels and consonants is solely from his thesis, due to the lack of similar resources of a precise nature.

=== Vowels ===
Standard Portuguese (SP) has rich vowel phonology with seven to nine oral vowels (depending on which dialect), five nasal vowels, ten oral diphthongs and five nasal diphthongs. While SLPC has retained the same oral vowels found in Standard Continental Portuguese, it does not make the distinction between nasalized and non-nasalized vowels. While the vowels are derived from Portuguese, the vowel features appear more similar to Tamil, since in both Tamil and the Creole vowels are distinguished by length.

Word internal sequences of two vowels do not occur in SLPC, therefore the creole does not appear to have diphthongs as there are in SP. Again, vowel lengthening seems to take place instead of diphthongization.

Chart A shows a vowel chart for SP, where nasality is distinguished from oral vowels, and a vowel chart for SLPC, where vowel length is a distinctive feature. Chart (B) shows both long vowels (such as the word for 'wax', [ˈseːɾə], from BrP 'cera') and short vowels (such as in the word for 'want', [ˈkeɾə], from BrP 'querer').

Besides the distinction between vowel length and vowel nasality, the place of stress on vowels distinguishes SP and SLPC. Both Batticaloan Tamil and the SLPC have entirely predictable stress patterns whereas SP does not. While stress is predictable, it is not simply a surface phenomenon, so it must be represented lexically.

A few rules about stress in SLPC:

1. Either short or long vowels can take on stress, but long vowels always carry stress.
2. A word can contain only one phonetically long vowel, but numerous unstressed short vowels.
3. Short vowels can be stressed only when found in initial syllables.
4. Stress falls on the last underlying long vowel of a word, or on the first vowel of a word having no long vowel.

Stress is important as it relates to the phonological changes that occur in the Creole. For instance, there is [vowel reduction] by way of prominence reduction of unstressed vowels. This means that relatively long vowels in an unstressed position are replaced by shorter vowels of a similar quality.

As a general rule, low and mid-vowels are contrastive under stress in SLPC, but neutralized and given the features of a mid-vowel when not stressed. Another way to say this is that through a pattern of neutralization, high [sonority] vowels are eliminated in SLPC. The pattern of vowel reduction is shown in Table (1) below:

Table 1. Patterns of vowel reduction in SLPC on low, unstressed vowels.
	Long Vowels - Stressed	Same Low Vowels - Unstressed
Unstressed ɒ > o	ɒːbɘ 'profession'; ˈnoːmi 'name'	oˈbreːru 'manual worker'; nomiˈnaː 'nominate'
Unstressed æ > e	p_ːdərə 'stone'; færːru 'iron'	pedriˈjaːdu 'ornamented w/stones'; feréru 'blacksmith'
Unstressed a > ə	ˈbaːjlu 'dance'; baːry 'beard'	bəjlˈdor 'dancer'; bərˈveːru 'barber'

Other phonological processes vowels of SLPC demonstrate are epenthesis and elision. Neither is a very common phenomena, however, so they will only be dealt with briefly. The insertion of epenthetic /u/ occurs to prevent the formation of certain consonant clusters that are atypical. One example of this is seen when the verb 'to judge' or [julˈɡa], is nominalized. This is done by the suffix /-dor/, which requires an epenthetic /u/ when added to the stem /julɡ-/, because the potentially resulting consonant cluster of /lɡd/ does not regularly occur in the language. Therefore the combination of the stem, the epenthetic /u/ and the suffix /-dor/ yields the form [julɡuˈdor], where the /u/ is inserted in-between the /lɡ/ and the /d/. Since word medial sequences of two or more vowels do not occur in Sri Lanka, as mentioned earlier, a process of vowel elision and glide epenthesis can co-occur to prevent vowels from coming together. Firstly, when there exists a possible combination of two vowels as result of some sort of word construction a glide separates them. Secondly, as a result of this the first vowel of the two may be reduced or elided.

Standard Portuguese
	Front		Central		Back	
	oral	nasal	oral	nasal	oral	nasal
Close	i	ĩ	ɯ		u	ũ
Close-mid	e	ẽ			o	õ
Open-mid	ɛ		ɐ	ɐ̃	ɔ	
Open			a			

Sri Lanka Portuguese Creole
	Front		Central		Back	
	short	long	short	long	short	long
Close	i	iː			u	uː
Close-mid	e	eː			o	oː
Open-mid	ɛ	ɛː	ə		ɔ	ɔː
Open	æ	æː		aː		

=== Consonants ===
SLPC uses several manners of consonant articulation which are not found in SP. Since this Creole do does express influence from Batticaloa Tamil, English, and Dutch (particularly via loan words.) It is difficult to determine where some of these segments have been loaned from. For instance, the closed front rounded vowel /y/ is considered a glide in SLPC and does not behave this way in Tamil or Portuguese. It seems to have evolved for the high front vowel /i/.

As mentioned earlier, SLPC seems to have an affinity for gemination of vowels resulting in a distinction between short and long vowels. As for consonants, there is also a tendency to geminate all voiceless consonants after a short stressed vowel. However, all tense consonants can optionally become geminate. For instance, in the word /feːci/ (lock), the /c/ can become stressed and geminate, to achieve the pronunciation [ˈfeːttʃi]. Similarly, word /saːku/ (bag) can become [saːkku] which can be achieved by the simple rule:

[[+tense] C]→[+long]

Sri Lankan Portuguese Creole
		Labial	Dental/Alveolar	Postalveolar	Palatal	Velar
Nasal		m	n		ɲ	
Plosive	voiceless	p	t	tʃ		k
Plosive	voiced	b	d	dʒ		ɡ
Fricative	voiceless	f	s			
Fricative	voiced		z			
Liquid	lateral		l			
Liquid	rhotic		r			
Glide		w			j	

Standard Portuguese
		Labial	Dental/Alveolar	Postalveolar	Palatal	Velar	Uvular
Nasal		m	n̪				
Plosive	voiceless	p	t̪			k	
Plosive	voiced	b	d̪			ɡ	
Fricative	voiceless	f	s	ʃ			ʁ
Fricative	voiced	v	z	ʒ			
Liquid	lateral		l		ʎ		
Liquid	rhotic		ɾ				

== Vocabulary ==
Like many creoles, SLPC is made up of lexical items from an array of different sources. There is, of course, much influence from the indigenous languages like Tamil and Sinhala. Portuguese had a vast impact on this creole, and there are also traces of Dutch and English. It was also most likely influenced by other creoles and varieties of Indo-Portuguese, as the island was visited frequently by traders from Goa and other Portuguese settlements like Daman, and Diu. The similarities with other Indo-Portuguese creoles may also be, however, due to similar circumstances and traits of the languages from which they stem. There is also some Malay influences and loan words.

Example of Portuguese origin words:

Vocabulary of Portuguese origin
Lemma	Portuguese word	Gloss
nariz	nariz	nose
besos	beiços	lips
kum	com	with
hum(a)	um(a)	one, a/an
sumana	semana	week
mael	mel	honey
meo	meio	middle
cam	chão	ground, floor
almuça	almoço (lunch)	breakfast
fome	fome	hunger
basu	baixo	low

Vocabulary of Dutch origin
Lemma	Dutch word	Gloss
krel	krul	curl
rol	rollen	roll
gorgel	gorgel	throat
ruvin	ruïne	ruin

Example of Tamil / Sinhala origin words:

Vocabulary of Tamil/Sinhala origin
Lemma	Tamil/Sinhala word	Gloss
pepiya	Tamil pepiya	speak
podiyas	Sinhala podi (small), from Batticaloa Tamil potiyan (small boy)	children
nona	Sinhala nona, from Portuguese dona	lady
sarayatiya	Sinhala sarayatiya	walking stick

== Syntax ==
The normal sentence structure of standard Portuguese (SP) is subject verb object (SVO). In Sri Lanka Portuguese Creole (SLPC), SVO dominates, but SOV and OSV also occur. The syntax structure is similar to that of Tamil. For example, the verb has been reduced to a single form, and tense-mood-aspect markers (lo, te, ja) indicate the future, present and past tenses; that is, lo leva (SLPC): levará (SP) 'he will carry'; te folga (SLPC): folgam (SP) 'they rejoice'; ja olha (SLPC): olhei (SP) 'I saw.' (see 'phrase samples' below)

Also, 'se' the conditional marker, comes at the end of the utterance like in:

ja pepiya se
'if [they] speak.'

nosse jentis dos pesam tinhe se
'if two of our people are [there].'

In standard Portuguese, the conditional marker 'se' usually comes at the beginning of the utterance:

se eu vou contigo, eu vou dirigir.
"if I go with you, I will drive."

se soubesse do bem que me faz!
"if [he/she] knew the good it does me!"

=== Phrase samples ===
- Que vosse lo* tem diziado per acha? "what will you please to have?"
  *note lo to indicate future
- Tem aquel verdade? "Is it true?"
- Ala nontem asiilei cousa. "There is no such thing."
- Eu nihumtempo novo ouvi aquel. "I have never heard of it."
- Vosse que te* avisa parmi per fai? "What do you advise me to do?"
  *note te to indicate present
- Huma nonpode ouvi otro huma que papia. "One cannot hear another speak"
- Vosse quanto vez ja* caza? "How many times have you married?"
  *note ja to indicate past tense

== See also ==
- Ceylon Creole Dutch
- Sri Lanka Kaffir people
- Portuguese period in Ceylon
- Burgher people
- Dutch period in Ceylon
