= Mestiços (Sri Lanka) =

In Sri Lanka, the names Mestiços (Portuguese for "Mixed People") or Casados ("Married") referred to people of mixed Portuguese and Sri Lankan (Sinhalese and Tamil) descent. The names can be traced back to the 16th century.

== History ==
The first mestiços descended from Portuguese explorers, soldiers and merchants who reached Ceylon (an earlier name of Sri Lanka) after the pioneering voyage of Vasco da Gama.

When the Dutch East India Company took over coastal Ceylon, the descendants of the mestiços took refuge in the central hills of Kingdom of Kandy under Sinhalese rule.

By the middle of the 18th century, the descendants of the mestiços had partly merged with descendants of the Dutch, giving rise to a Eurasian community (a mixture of Portuguese, Dutch, Sinhalese and Tamil), known as the Burghers. Some of these people spoke Portuguese, others spoke Dutch. Later, the Burgher community developed into two different communities: the Dutch Burghers and the Portuguese Burghers.

The Portuguese presence in Ceylon was extended to non-urban areas, there is a wide Portuguese heritage in Sri Lankan society, culture and administration. Lexicon of Portuguese origin can be found in the Sinhala language (at least 1,000 words), there may be more but insufficient study has been carried out.
