= Sri Lankan Kaffirs =

Sri Lankan ethnic group of African Bantu descent

Sri Lanka Kaffirs
Total population
- Few thousand (2005); ~1,000 (2009)

Regions with significant populations
- Sri Lanka: ~1,000

Languages
- Sri Lankan Portuguese Creole, Sinhala, Tamil

Religion
- Originally folk religion Roman Catholic, Buddhism

The Sri Lankan Kaffirs (cafrinhas in Portuguese, කාපිරි kāpiriyō in Sinhala, and காப்பிலி kāppili in Tamil) are an ethnic group in Sri Lanka who are partially descended from 16th-century Portuguese traders and Bantu slaves who were brought by them to work as labourers and soldiers to fight against the Sinhala kings. They are very similar to the Zanj-descended populations in Iraq and Kuwait, and are known in Pakistan as Sheedis and in India as Siddis. The Kaffirs spoke a distinctive creole based on Portuguese, known as the "Sri Lankan Kaffir language" (now extinct). Their cultural heritage includes the dance styles Kaffringna and Manja and their popular form of dance music Baila.

== Etymology ==
The word Kaffir is an obsolete English term once used to designate natives from the African Great Lakes and Southern African coasts. In South Africa, it became a slur. "Kaffir" derives in turn from the Arabic kafir, which means "unbeliever".

== History ==
Kaffirs have an oral history maintained by families that are descended from slaves from Africa. While Arabs were the original slave traders in the African Great Lakes slave trade via the Indian Ocean slave trade, Portuguese colonialists later brought Bantu slaves to the Indian subcontinent. However fragmented official documentation may be, the recent public promotion of their music and dance forms allows the broader Sri Lankan society to acknowledge and better understand Kaffir history.

Historical records indicate that Portuguese traders brought Siddis to the Indian subcontinent between 300 and 500 years ago. The Kaffirs were brought to Sri Lanka as a source of labour between the ninth and nineteenth centuries by Arab merchants.

The Portuguese, Dutch, and the British used the Kaffirs as a part of their naval forces and for domestic labor. When Dutch colonialists arrived around 1600, the Kaffirs worked on cinnamon plantations along the southern coast and some had settled in the Kandyan kingdom. Some research suggests that Kaffir slaves were employed as soldiers to fight against Sri Lankan kings, most likely in the Sinhalese–Portuguese War (Mulleriyawa (1562), Randeniwela (1630), Gannoruwa (1638)).

== Demography ==
The descendants of the freed Kaffir slaves are still a distinctive community and are mainly found in the former occupied territories of the Portuguese colonists, mainly near Puttalam, in the North Western Province of Sri Lanka but also in areas such as Trincomalee, Batticaloa and Negombo. There was some contact between the Kaffir and the Burghers, communities of partly European ancestry on the East coast of Sri Lanka.

== Religion ==
Sri Lankan Kaffirs originally adhered to traditional faiths. However, they now practice religions from Catholicism to Buddhism.

== Culture ==
Sri Lankan Kaffir culture is a direct link back to their distant past in the African Great Lakes, which is rapidly disappearing.

=== Music ===
Baila is a form of dance music popular in Sri Lanka, originating centuries ago among the Kaffirs or Afro-Sri Lankan communities (mixed communities consisting of Portuguese, Bantu, and native Sri Lankan people). It has its origins in African folk music of the east coast of Africa was later amalgamated with European instruments and eastern and western rhythms, especially rhythms found in Spain and northern European folk music.

=== Language ===
They spoke a distinctive creole based on Portuguese. The extinct language was known as the 'Sri Lankan Kaffir language'. It differs from Sri Lankan Portuguese creole.

== See also ==
- Siddi – Communities of Bantu descent in Pakistan and India
- Kaffir (racial term)
- Portuguese-based creole languages
- Cafres
