= List of Burgher people =

This is a list of notable Burgher people, who are a Eurasian ethnic group, historically from Sri Lanka, consisting for the most part of male-line descendants of European colonists from the 16th to 20th centuries (mostly Portuguese, Dutch, German and British) and local women, with some minorities of French and Irish.

== Academics ==
- E. F. C. Ludowyk – Professor of English, Dean of the School of Arts, University of Ceylon
- Prof. E. O. E. Pereira – founding Dean of the Faculty of Engineering, University of Ceylon; Vice Chancellor Peradeniya

== Civil servants ==
- Major General Bertram Heyn – Commander of Ceylon Army; cricket, field hockey and rugby star
- Neville Jansz – Sri Lankan diplomat
- M. C. Sansoni – Puisne Judge and then Chief Justice
- Sir Francis Soertsz – Supreme Court Judge
- Wilhelm Woutersz – Sri Lankan diplomat
- Dr. Richard Gerald Anthonisz - First Colonial Secretary and Chief Archivist of the National Archives of Ceylon.

== Professionals ==
- Cecil Balmond – Structural engineer and architectural theoretician
- Louis Edmund Blaze – Educator and founder of Kingswood College, Kandy
- Frederick Dornhorst – Lawyer

== Artists ==
- Jean Arasanayagam (née Solomonsz) – poet and painter
- William Wright Beling – painter and father of Geoffrey Beling
- George Keyt – painter and founding member of Colombo '43 Group
- J. L. K. van Dort – 19th-century artist
- Lionel Wendt – photographer and founder of the Colombo '43 Group

== Authors ==
- David Blacker – author and blogger, winner of the State Literary Award for Best Novel in 2006
- Michelle de Kretser - Australian novelist
- Carl Muller – prolific author of many books including The Jam Fruit Tree, The Yakada Yaka, Once Upon a Tender Time and Children of the Lion
- Michael Ondaatje – Canadian poet and author of numerous novels, including The English Patient
- Leah Lakshmi Piepzna-Samarasinha – poet and activist
- Rosemary Rogers – best-selling author of romance novels in the USA; has been on the New York Times best-sellers list
- Vivimarie Vanderpoorten – poet, winner of Gratiaen Prize 2009

== Journalists ==
- Frederica Jansz – Sri Lanka journalist, editor of The Sunday Leader

== Politics ==
- Peter Daniel Anthonisz – first President of the Ceylon Branch of British Medical Association; member of the Legislative Council
- Professor David de Kretser – professor and Director for the Institute of Reproduction and Development, Monash University; former Governor of Victoria, Australia
- Pieter Keuneman – Sri Lankan politician
- Quint Ondaatje – Dutch patriot and politician
- Beverley Pinder – Councillor, City of Melbourne, Australia; former Miss Australia

== Chefs ==
- Geoff Jansz – Australian TV chef
- Charmaine Solomon – Australian resident chef and well-known writer of Asian cookbooks

== Musicians and entertainers ==
- Vasanthi Chathurani – actress
- Elaine Cole – baila dancer
- Danielle de Niese – Australian-American opera singer
- Stuart de Silva – Sri Lankan jazz pianist and actor
- Jamie Durie – Australian media personality
- Jacqueline Fernandez – actor; Miss Universe 2006 contestant
- Cliff Foenander – musician
- Anton Jones – baila singer
- Desmond Kelly – Australian musician; actor
- Alston Koch – Australian musician
- Douglas Meerwald – singer
- Keith Potger – musician; member of The Seekers; founder of The New Seekers
- Guy Sebastian – Australian singer
- Gina Zamparelli – Los Angeles-based concert promoter

== Fashion and models ==
- Nigel Barker – fashion photographer
- Ramani Bartholomeusz – actress and model, represented Sri Lanka in the Miss Universe 1985 pageant
- Sabrina Herft – Miss Sri Lanka for Miss Universe 2012
- Maureen Hingert – represented Sri Lanka (then Ceylon) when Ceylon took part for the first time at the 1954 Miss Universe pageant; second runner-up
- Dannielle Kerkoven – model and Former Miss Sri Lanka for Miss. World-2006

== Athletes ==
- Graeme Labrooy – former Sri Lankan cricketer
- Sir Christopher Ondaatje – former athlete; philanthropist
- Laddie Outschoorn – England cricketer (Worcestershire County Cricket Club, 1946–1959); Cap 1948
- Michael Vandort – Sri Lankan cricketer
- Jeffrey Vandersay - Sri Lankan cricketer
- Duncan White – Sri Lankan (then Ceylonese) 440m silver medalist at the London Olympics in 1948; gold medalist 1950 Empire games
- Jack Hingert - British-born Australian-Sri Lankan footballer
- Wade Dekker - Australian-born Sri Lankan footballer
- Oliver Kelaart - Australian-born Sri Lankan footballer
- Craig Jacotine - Australian rules footballer

== See also ==
- List of Sri Lankans
