= William Wright Beling II =

Sri Lankan artist (1867–1928)

- Born: 31 December 1867; Colombo, Sri Lanka
- Died: 23 June 1928 (aged 60); Colombo, Sri Lanka
- Education: Wesley College
- Spouses: Charlotte Eliza Conderlag; Eleanor Frances Morgan Swan

William Wright Beling (31 December 1867 – 23 June 1928) was a Ceylonese watercolour painter of Dutch Burgher descent.

== Biography ==
=== Early life ===
William Wright Beling II was born in Wolvendahl, Colombo, Sri Lanka (then Ceylon), the son of William Wright Beling I and Maria Elizabeth Prins.

Beling's father, William Wright (1841–1894) was a Proctor of the Supreme Court, and his mother Maria Elizabeth Prins (1841–1888), was the daughter of H. C. Prins, also a Proctor of the Supreme Court. The Belings are descended from Willem Carl Beling of Aurich, who married, in Colombo on 30 November 1766, Maria Regina Swartskop. The family belongs to the Dutch Burgher community of Sri Lanka. Beling was the second son and the second eldest of a family of eight children, consisting of four brothers and three sisters. Harry Prins (1864–1944), Leopold Charles Carmichael (1869–1936), Ulrica Antoinette (1871–?), Dr. Christopher Charles (1873–1946) (Assistant Physician at the New Jersey State Hospital for the Insane, Clinical assistant at the Vanderbilt Clinic in New York, visiting neurologist at Newark City Hospital and St. Michael's Hospital, and from 1919–1923 a neuro-psychiatrist for the United States Veterans Bureau,) Jessie Alexandra Maria (1874–1951), Antoninette 'Annie' Aileen (1876–1910) (mother of the art patron Len Van Geyzel) and Aelian Arnold (1879–1967) (father of John Kingsman Beling, Rear Admiral of the United States Navy).

=== Artistry ===
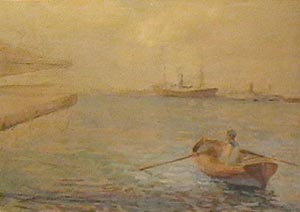
A painting by W. W. Beling

Even at a young age, Bill Beling (as he was commonly known) caught the attention of Ceylon's most celebrated 19th century painter, J. L. K. van Dort, who said that 'young Beling's work was of the greatest promise'. His early schooling was undertaken at a private school in Barber Street, conducted by Mr. Ebert Ludekens Voorlezer of Wolvendaal Church. From here he went to Wesley College, and in 1888 he left school and joined the Survey Department as a draughtsman. Around the same time he joined Miss Barbara Layard's sketch club, which marks the beginning of his art career. Some of his earliest sketches are dated to 1891 and are mostly pen and ink studies of 'sea and sky, rocks, ships and small sailing craft'. In 1894 he joined the Customs Department, and until his death he served at the Revenue Collecting Department. It is believed that this was the happiest period of his career as the kaleidoscope of the harbour and the Customs would have provided him with many a subject, resulting in some of his most fruitful years as an artist.

In the Art Exhibition Catalogue of 1899 he was one of the judges and a member of the Hanging Committee. Beling sent in eleven pictures, including six oils, of which "Japanese Warship Airing Clothes" took the Society's prize. He was also the recipient of the prize for the 'Best Picture in Water Colours' and 'Best Figure in Water Colour'.

Dr. H. U. Leembruggen writes

It is as an artist of individuality and merit that he was most widely known, to a large circle of admirers. His pictures were typical of the man; they were not the result of painstaking and laborious effort, but little gems of poetic conception and charming colour, full of restrained beauty, thrown oil "at a heat" from his teeming brain when the mood seized him. His earlier work was chiefly seascape and studies in the Harbour of Colombo, as I have mentioned above. Later, he developed into an unrivalled landscapist, whose pictures were eagerly snapped up by indiscriminating collectors. It is a regret of his friends that he was never able to publish a book of his sketches. Growing up as he did in the midst of a family circle, nearly all the members of which were richly gifted with artistic and musical talent, W. W. B., in spite of the lack of any special art training, soon made a name for himself, which will not be easily effaced. He loved art for its own sake, and never did a foreign Artist of any merit visit these shores, but Bill was soon on his track and comparing notes with him as with a friend and brother.

=== Family life ===
On 24 February 1897 Beling married Charlotte Eliza Conderlag (1870–1903), the daughter of Wilfred Morgan Conderlag (Deputy Registrar of the Supreme Court) and Charlotte Frances Prins in Milagiriya. Charlotte died on 18 May 1903 leaving behind two sons, William Wright III (25 July 1898) and Christopher 'Christie' Lorenz (23 September 1900), who inherited his father's artistic talent, and one daughter, Blanche Amybelle (12 March 1902). In 1906 he married Eleanor Frances Morgan Swan (1886–?), the daughter of James William Swan (Proctor of Gampola) and Marianne Eleanor Morgan, in Gampola. H. U. Leembruggen describes Eleanor as the 'mother of the modern Gracchi'. They had two sons, William James Geoffrey (22 September 1907) (Chief Inspector of Art 1932–1967 and founder member of the '43 Group) and Bertram 'Bonnie' Wright (12 September 1909 – 16 May 1952), who was also known in theater circles as Richard Beling, and one daughter, Marie Annette (14 December 1914 – 18 April 1916), who died in infancy.

=== Death ===
The following death notice was inserted into the 18th volume of the 1928 Journal of the Dutch Burgher Union of Ceylon:

As we are going through the press the news has reached us of the death of William Wright Beling, the greatest artist which the Dutch Burgher Community has produced for some generations—perhaps at any time. He had been ill for several months and no hope of his recovery was entertained for the last few days. He passed away in the forenoon of Saturday the 23rd instant. He was an original member of the Dutch Burgher Union and was much attached to it, but we must reserve a further account of his life and labours for a future issue. We can here only convey to his wife and family the deep sympathy we feel for them.

== Legacy ==
On 27 August 1928, Dr. H. U. Leembruggen proposed the idea of a Memorial Exhibition of the works of Beling. The exhibition would primarily showcase the works of the late Mr. W. W. Beling from the years 1890 to 1928 along with works of other artists in the Burgher community. "Miss Grace van Dort, Messrs. E. F. van Dort, E. G. and Sam A. Koch, C. L. and W. J. G. Beling (his sons Christie and Geoff Beling) and Mr. George Keyt, (who was specially invited to contribute)". A collection of sketches and drawings by the famous 19th Century Ceylonese artist Mr. J. L. K. van Dort, was also exhibited at the exhibition and is recorded to have provoked a lot of interest due to the historical value of these art pieces. Mr. Otto Schienhammer, a distinguished landscape painter from Munich, loaned eight paintings to the exhibition.

The exhibition, held from 23 to 28 October 1928, was opened by His Excellency, Sir Herbert Stanley, the Governor of Ceylon (1928–1931) 'in the presence of a large and representative gathering'. In his opening comments Sir Herbert Stanley said that he "had seen one or two of Mr. Beling's pictures since he had been in the island, but he had not had the opportunity of seeing such a large collection, and forming the estimate of what his work was really like. He looked forward with great interest to seeing for himself a fairly representative exhibition of his work". His Excellency went on to say that he "was interested in all that he had heard and read of the late Mr. Beling. He was a many sided man. He was a distinguished public servant, a great sportsman, a good shot and he must have been fond of horses".

The Journal of the Dutch Burgher Union of Ceylon (Vol. XVIIL – April 1929) records the following members of the Union as being on the Committee: Miss Grace van Dort, Dr. R. L. Spittel, Mr. A. B. Keuneman, Lt. Col W. E. V. de Rooy, Col. A. C. B. Jonklaas, Dr. L. A. Prina, Messrs. Lionel Wendt, E. A. van der Straaten, Ernest E. van Dort, E. G. Koch and C. L. Beling, with the Hony. Secretary and Hony. Treasurer of the D. B. U. as ex-officio members. Manel Fonseka, in her book Lionel Wendt – A Centennial Tribute, notes that Wendt's friendship with the family of the painter W. W. Beling, "may have begun before Beling's son Geoffrey went to India in 1926 to study architecture and art. He was on the committee of the W. W. Beling Memorial Art Exhibition in 1928, at which Keyt, the younger Beling and a German post-impressionist Otto Scheinhammer also exhibited".

Beling's work is primarily housed in private collections in Sri Lanka and abroad.

In 2004 the Burgher Connection Exhibition was held between 27 and 30 May at the Harold Peiris Gallery of the Lionel Wendt. The Dutch Burgher Union organized the exhibition as one of their celebrations to mark the 400th anniversary of the arrival of the Dutch in Sri Lanka. W. W. Beling's "View of Dutch Canal" and "Morning on Tuankai Lake" were two of the paintings showcased at the exhibition. Caryl Nugara, reviewing the exhibition, wrote that:

In dark, phantom shades of green and browny yellow W. W. Beling gave us a "View of Dutch Canal". It depicted the charm of turgid yet placid waters, greenery and tender coconut palms. The "padda" house boat almost hiding in the curve of the canal was romantic. "Morning on Tuankai Lake" awakened from the night's slumber was aesthetically beautiful.

In March 2008 'Sketchbook: An Exhibition of the Beling Family to commemorate the 100th birth year of Geoffrey Beling' was hosted at the Sapumal Foundation in Colombo. Along with the works of the artist Geoffrey Beling, it also showcased sketches and paintings by his father, W. W. Beling.
