= Chitrasena =

Sri Lankan dancer (1921–2005)

- Chitrasena
- Born: Amaratunga Arachige Maurice Dias; 26 January 1921; Kelaniya, Sri Lanka
- Died: 18 July 2005 (aged 84); Colombo, Sri Lanka
- Occupation: Dancer
- Spouse: Vajira Chitrasena (m. 1951 – 2004)
- Children: Upeka; Anjalika

Deshamanya Amaratunga Arachige Maurice Dias (26 January 1921 – 18 July 2005), popularly known by his mononym Chitrasena, was a Sri Lankan dancer, internationally known for his work in establishing a modern Sri Lankan tradition of dance and popularizing traditional Sri Lankan dance forms worldwide. He was awarded the Deshamanya award by the Sri Lankan government in 1998. He later moved to India to study other dance forms.

Chitrasena found the Chithrasena Dance Company in 1943. He studied in the Shantinikethan in India. In 1951, Chithrasena married his pupil Vajira, who went on to become a fine performer. Chithrasena has danced before maharajas, Queen Elizabeth II, dukes and duchesses, prime ministers, princesses, and kings.

== Early life ==
Amaratunga Arachige Maurice Dias alias Chitrasena was born on 26 January 1921 at Waragoda, Kelaniya in Sri Lanka. His father was late Seebert Dias, well known actor/ producer of the 20s and 30s, founder and instructor for the Colombo Dramatic Club, producer of John de Silva plays, luminary in the theatrical circles of the day, and was a pioneer actor/director of Shakespearean dramas in Sinhala and English. Chitrasena was encouraged by his father from a young age to learn dance and theatre.

In India, Tagore had established his Santiniketan. His lectures on his visit to Sri Lanka, in 1934 had inspired a revolutionary change in the outlook of many educated men and women. Tagore had stressed the need for a people to discover its own culture to be able to assimilate fruitfully the best of other cultures. Chitrasena was a schoolboy at the time, and his father Seebert Dias' house had become a veritable cultural centre frequented by the literary and artistic intelligentsia of the time.

In 1936, Chitrasena made his debut at the Regal Theatre at the age of 15 in the role of Siri Sangabo, the first Sinhala ballet produced and directed by his father. Presented in Kandyan technique, Chitrasena played the lead role, and this made people take notice of the boy's talents. D.B. Jayatilake, who was Vice-chairman of the board of Ministers under British council administration, Buddhist scholar, founder and first President of the Colombo Y.M.B.A, freedom fighter, Leader of the State Council and Minister of Home Affairs, was a great source of encouragement to the young dancer.

Chitrasena learned Kandyan dance from Algama Kiriganithaya Gurunnanse, Muddanawe Appuwa Gurunnanse, Bevilgamuwe Lnpaya Gurunnanse Having mastered the traditional Kandyan dance, his 'Ves Bandeema' ceremony of graduation by placing the 'Ves Thattuwa' on the initiate's head followed by the 'Kala-eliya' mangallaya, took place in 1940. In the same year, he proceeded to Travancore to study Kathakali dance at Sri Chitrodaya Natyakalalayam under Sri Gopinath, Court dancer in Travancore. He gave a command performance with Chandralekha (wife of portrait painter J.D.A. Perera) before the Maharaja and Maharani of Travancore at the Kowdiar Palace. He later studied Kathakali at the Kerala Kalamandalam.

In 1941, Chitrasena performed at the Regal Theatre – one of the first dance recitals of its kind – before the Governor Sir Andrew Caldecott and Lady Caldecott with Chandralekha and her troupe. Chandralekha was one of the first women to break into the field of the Kandyan dance.

Chitrasena founded the Chitrasena Dance Company in 1943. He toured extensively in the provinces. Chitrasena's brother Sarathsena, a versatile drummer, and sister Munirani were associated in the early dance period. Munirani was a soloist in 'Vidura' ballet.

Chitrasena established the first school of National Dance, the Chitrasena Kalayathanaya, in Colombo at Kollupitiya in 1944. The sprawling building was handed to him by Sir Ernest Fernando, a great patron of the arts – to pursue and further his artistic work. Starting as a small nucleus, the dance centre where Chitrasena lived and worked for 40 years was to become a landmark and a renowned cultural centre for dance enthusiasts and connoisseurs of the arts.

In 1945, Chitrasena studied at Gurudev Rabindranath Tagore's Shantiniketan in Bengal and had the distinction of dancing the lead role as Ananda in Tagore's dance drama 'Chandalika' opposite Nandita Kriplani, Tagore's granddaughter. Chitrasena is a contemporary of Uday Shankar. He represented Shantiniketan at the All India Dance Festival in Delhi. He visited numerous dance centers in Lucknow, Lahore, and Uday Shankar's dance center in Almora, Assam. He performed in a Shantiniketan show in aid of Tagore's Memorial fund at the New Empire theatre in Calcutta.

Rabindranath Tagore and the indigenous revival among India's Bengali elite inspired several Sri Lankan artistes to drop their Portuguese influenced names and adopt oriental names. Amaradeva, Sarachchandra and Chitrasena are some of those who did.

== Early Period – Obstacles ==
The early period was fraught with severe hardship, insecurity, and frustration. The urban intelligentsia, nurtured as they were on pseudo- colonial values, frowned on things indigenous or at best with native curiosity. They were unprepared to accept the idea of the traditional dance in relationship to the theatre. They faced adversities including: indignities, insults, lack of patronage, a reluctant and disoriented public, little if any media coverage, oppositional leaflets circulated claiming that the traditional dance was being destroyed, and anonymous postcards. Chitrasena was breaking new ground, and there were instances of him being actually hooted off the stage. Not belonging to the traditional dancing 'parampara', it took him years of hard work to be recognised as an artiste in his own right. Even the traditional dancers who were the proud custodians of an ancient heritage going back over 3,000 years looked on Chitrasena with derision.

There were no proper theatre facilities. In the outstations, stages were poorly constructed, the local town hall or central school hall serving as theatre. Moreover, poor theatre conditions included: primitive lighting fixtures, improvised switch board, crude cardboard and coloured cellophane, dimmers operated with fan switches, improvised bamboo frames to hang curtains, and a lack of green rooms.

== Pioneering years ==
The dawn of a new era brought with it the challenges of the unknown. In spite of the frustrations due to lack of patronage, they were years of fruitful exchange of ideas and experimentation activity. 'Ravana', 'Vidura', 'Chandali', 'Nala Damayanthi' were creative outpourings of that time, and there was a tremendous Indian influence on the local art scene. Chitrasena considered one of his earliest works, the ballet 'Vidura' (1945), to be the important break-through in his experimenting with a new medium. It was only later, after he had judged the effect of this new thing on the audience, that he moved with full confidence into his sensuous creation, 'Nala Damayanti' (1950). In Karadiya (1961), he emerged as the master.

In 1951, Chitrasena married his star pupil Vajira Chitrasena. He saw in her the makings of an outstanding dancer. She made her debut as soloist in the role of Prakriti in the ballet 'Chandali' in 1952. Her rise to stardom was coupled with unswerving discipline and dedication both as teacher, performer, and choreographer, even as she illumined her husband's career.

== The Chitrasena Kalayathanaya ==
Started in 1944 in Colombo, the Chitrasena Kalayathanaya was the center of new forms of arts and culture from the 1940s to the 70s. Begun in a rented house gifted by philanthropist Sir E. P. A. Fernando, the Kalayatanaya building situated a few yards away from Kollupitiya junction, was the oasis of contemporary innovators who searched for new vistas in the aesthetic field. Chitrasena and Vajira introduced a new creative dance form based on indigenous dance to these young artists. The school started with only a handful of students who lived and worked in the studio.

The school became a cultural haven to the leading artists of that period whose talents and contributions were to become highly recognised. There has hardly been a name in the world of arts and letters, which has not at one time or another been associated with the Chitrasena Dance School. Some artistes were launched in their respective careers. Ananda Samarakoon lived and worked with Chitrasena and created the National Anthem whilst living in the school. He composed the music for some of the early ballets – with J. Sadiris Silva for 'Vidura' and with W. D. Amaradeva for 'Chandali'. Sunil Santha After his return from Lucknow, Bathkande College of Music held his music classes at the studio. One of the country's leading authorities on music, Amaradeva's early days, is closely linked with the Chitrasena School. Dramatists like Henry Jayasena and Ernest Macintyre conducted rehearsals at the centre.

Other artists of the pioneering years included Somabandu, Edwin Samaradivakara, W. B. Makuloluwa, Lionel Algama, Somadasa Elvitigala, R L Wimaladharma, and Shelton Premaratne. The Kalayathanaya was also the focal point of many foreign artistes who visited Sri Lanka, film stars from India, and dancers like Martha Graham, Paul Tailor, Bulrashkhani, Nurtan and Marcel Marceau from France and Ravi Shankar who visited it several times. Ganganalh, Prema Kumar, Shesha Palihakkara were some of the earliest pupils.

In 1951, an open-air theatre was inaugurated at the Chitrasena Kalayathanaya under the patronage of Sir E P A Fernando. Sir A E de Silva was the chief guest.

In 1984, the land on which the Chitrasena Kalayathanaya stood was acquired by the Urban Development Authority, and the school was razed to the ground. In 1998, the then President of Sri Lanka, Chandrika Kumaranatunga, bequeathed some land on Park Road/ Elvitigala Mawatha, Colombo 05, to establish a permanent location for the Kalayathanaya. Subsequently, Chitrasena and his family raised sufficient funds to construct the dance school there. The Kalayathanaya is now known as the Chitrasena-Vajira Dance Foundation. Since Chitrasena's death in 2005, the Foundation is managed by his wife, Vajira and daughters Upeka and Anjalika.

== Contributions ==
After 50 decades of colonial rule, the traditional dance was left impoverished, and it was left to Chitrasena to infuse it with a new dynamism. He is associated with the revival of the traditional dance in all its three major forms; Kandyan, Low-Country and Sabaragamu.

He was the first professional artiste in Sri Lanka. He challenged the mood of the 30s and 40s and influenced the mind of a generation, establishing himself as an artiste unparalleled in the dance annals of this country. He was the pioneer of the modern dance theatre, which proved a viable alternative to the changing social milieu that sustained the traditional dance rituals. Chitrasena steered the course of dance along uncharted paths infusing it with a dynamism that flowed from his visionary seal and dedication, creating a distinct yet meaningful medium of expression. He brought about an infusion of the Theatre, the Stage, the world of audience, confrontation and entertainment to the Sinhala Dance. He revolutionised and extended the scope of dance, forging a link between the traditional and contemporary with the vision of one who seeks to preserve whilst yet extending the horizons of his medium, always going back for inspiration to the roots of his rich heritage. He transferred Sri Lankan folk dances to the modern theatre and from that transformation created a vehicle of artistic expression for the Sinhala Dance – the Ballet.

He was the pioneer of the national ballet. Chitrasena established the first school of dance in 1944. The Chitrasena Dance Company has won repute and fame that is international and received rave reviews for their productions both here and abroad. In the realm of creative work, the Dance Company has played a vital role in the evolution of the contemporary dance theatre of Sri Lanka.

Commentators, reflecting upon the nature of the man, his art and his legacy in Sri Lanka, believes that Chitrasena's art probes our milieu and explores the most tenacious issues faced within the construction of nation and State by the myriad of issues his dance addressed; from the hardships of fisherfolk and to issues of caste, religion, gender, love and identity and juxtaposition of hope and despair. Somewhere between Chitrasena's ballets Nala Damayanthi and Karadiya (Sea Water), and in some ways on a tangent to the completeness of their cycle, came the creations of Vasantha Kumar's Kumburu Panatha (The Paddy Lands Bill) and Hiroshima, together with Prema Kumar's Thiththa Batha (Bitter Rice); socio-political essays given a ballet form.

== Tours ==
The first tour to Australia of the Chitrasena Ballet was in 1963 under the patronage of the Australian Elizabethan Theatre Trust, where after their initial performance at the Festival of Perth, they presented seasons in Sydney, Melbourne, Launceston and Hobart. Produced and directed by its founder, Chitrasena, and led by him and his wife, Vajira, the company presented two programs in their inaugural Australian tour. After his performance in Sydney, Australia, in 1963, the Sydney "Daily Herald" said that Chitrasena is "one of the most virile dancers of any nation we have seen on a Sydney stage".

In 1972 the Chitrasena Ballet returned to Australia, as the Chitrasena Ceylon Dance Ensemble, supported by the Arts Council of Australia and the Ceylon Tea Bureau, to perform at the Adelaide Festival, the Festival of Perth, Melbourne, Sydney and Canberra. After his performance in Sydney, the Sydney "Daily Herald" newspaper once again, repeated its praise of him from a decade earlier, in the very same words.

== Dramas ==
Rakthakshi in 'Siri Sangabo' directed by Henry Jayasena on the occasion of the revival of the Tower Hall Theatre. Besides spearheading the revival of indigenous dance forms, Chitrasena also made his stage debut as Othello in the Ernest MacIntyre production of Shakespeare's 'Othello' and Emperor Jones in the late Karan Breckenridge's production of Eugene O'Neill's 'Emperor Jones'.He is one of the most best actors in sri lanka.

== Productions ==
- Rama & Seeta − 1943
- Vidura – 1944
- Pageant of Lanka (Ramayana & Landing of Vijaya) – 1948
- Ravana – 1949
- Nala Damayanthi – 1950
- Chandali – 1952
- Kumudini – 1952
- Himakumariya – 1953
- Sepalika – 1955
- Kindurangana – 1956
- Sama Vijaya – 1957
- Vanaja − 1958
- Karadiya – 1961
- Nala Damayanthi (2nd production) – 1963
- Rankikili – 1965
- Nirthanjali − 1965
- Gini Hora − 1968
- Nirasha − 1972
- Shadi − 1972
- Navanjali − 1972
- Anaberaya − 1976
- Kinkini Kolama − 1978
- Hapana − 1979
- Bera Pooja – 1980
- Navoda Ranga – 1981
- Shishya Pooja − 1982
- Dance of Shiva − 1985
- Nritha Pooja − 1986

== Awards ==
- Yuganthaya – 31 December 1999, awarded for his outstanding contribution to the dance of Sri Lanka.
- Desamanya – 6 April 1998, the highest award given to a citizen of Sri Lanka.
- Vishva Prasadinee – 20 April 1996, in honour of the national pride and international prestige brought to Sri Lanka by Chitrasena.
- Kala Bhushana – 22 May 1994, honouring the extraordinary contribution made by Chitrasena to posterity and to the development of the arts and culture of Sri Lanka.
- Kala Keerthi – Presidential award.
- Honorary degree of Doctor of Philosophy (Fine Arts) – 21 March 1991, Institute of Aesthetic Studies, University of Kelaniya, Sri Lanka.
- Kala Suri First Class – 22 May 1986, Presidential Award.

== Books ==
- Nurnberger, Marianne, Dance Is the Language of the Gods: The Chitrasena School and the Traditional Roots of Sri Lankan Stage Dance, 1998: VU University Press. (Paperback)
