= Anoma Pieris =

Australian-Sri Lankan Architectural historian

Anoma Darshani Pieris FSAH is an Australian-Sri Lankan architectural historian and academic. She is currently Professor of Architecture and Associate Dean (Research) at the Melbourne School of Design, University of Melbourne.

== Early life ==
Pieris was born in Colombo, Sri Lanka. She is the grand-daughter of the Ceylonese historian G.C. Mendis (1894-1976) who wrote Ceylon Under the British (1952) and The Colebrooke-Cameron Papers (1956) on British colonial policy in Ceylon. During her formative years she was strongly influenced by the painter Harry Pieris (1904-1988), a member of the Colombo ’43 Group of artists who established the Sapumal Foundation.

Pieris was educated at Ladies’ College in Cinnamon Gardens, Colombo, followed by undergraduate studies (1985-1988) at the University of Moratuwa, Sri Lanka. Her education was interrupted by the Sri Lankan civil war and JVP insurrection. In 1990 she attended Massachusetts Institute of Technology (MIT), on a scholarship to study architecture. An Aga Khan scholarship followed leading to a Master of Science in Architecture Studies.

Pieris has a PhD from University of California, Berkeley, 2003, and MPhil in Geography from the University of Melbourne in 2019. Her PhD research on the colonial prison in Singapore was published by the University of Hawaii Press as Hidden Hands and Divided Landscapes: a penal history of Singapore’s plural society (2009). Between 1996-2014, Pieris contributed a monthly column with the byline 'Contemporary Perspectives' in the Sri Lanka English-language business magazine LMD. In 2003, Pieris joined the Faculty of Architecture, Building and Planning at the Melbourne School of Design, University of Melbourne.

== Research and contributions ==
Pieris’ training is in architectural history and geography with a focus on postcolonialism and subaltern studies as applied to the architecture of South and Southeast Asia - more specifically to Sri Lanka and Singapore - and has published widely on issues of nationalism, citizenship and sovereignty. Pieris has also published on the design profession in Asia and Australia in particular to the design of museums and cultural centres for and by Indigenous communities globally. Her more recent work has been on the Asia Pacific war and war cemeteries. In 2023, Pieris was named a Fellow of the Society of Architectural Historians (SAH) for a lifetime of significant contributions to the field.

Pieris was the recipient of an Australian Research Council (ARC) Future Fellowship for Temporal Cities, Provisional Citizens: Architectures of Internment (2015-2018). The publication from this project co-authored with Japanese-American scholar Lynne Horiuchi and titled The Architecture of Confinement: incarceration camps of the Pacific War was published by Cambridge University Press in 2022. From 2019-2023, Pieris led a team of researchers on the ARC Discovery Project Architecture and Industry: the migrant contribution to nation building with the co-authored book Immigrant Industry: Building Postwar Australia, published by Berghahn in 2024. She also exhibited on migrant labour on the Snowy Hydro Scheme as part of the collaborative exhibition, Immigrant Networks, at Museo Italiano, Melbourne.

Pieris has been actively involved with the Society of Architectural Historians, Australia and New Zealand (SAHANZ). Between 2016-2019, she co-edited Fabrications: Journal of the Society of Architectural Historians, Australia and New Zealand with Stuart King and Mirjana Lozanovska respectively, and from 2010-2018 was on the Melbourne editorial team of Post Colonial Studies. She was on the editorial board of Fabrications and is currently on the board of the Hong Kong University Press book series Critical Architectural and Urban Histories of Asia. She is an editor with Farhan Karim and Lee Kah Wee of the National University of Singapore Press book series, Across the Global South: Built Environments in Critical Perspective.

Pieris is co-founder with Duanfang Lu of the ‘Society of Architectural and Urban Historians of Asia’ a regional mentorship network for scholarship on Asia, serving as president in 2016-18. She served as a councillor for the Institute of Post Colonial Studies in Melbourne from 2008-2015 and was elected Southeast Asia councillor for the Asian Studies Association of Australia in 2020.

Pieris was guest curator with Martino Stierli, Sean Anderson and Evangelos Kotsioris of the 2022 Museum of Modern Art (MoMA) exhibition, The Project of Independence: Architectures of Decolonization in South Asia, 1947-1985 and co-editor of the exhibition catalogue. In 2025, Pieris and Australian architect Athanasios Tsakonas are guest co-curating the exhibition Eucalypts of Hodogaya, with Victoria’s Shrine of Remembrance. In 2026, Pieris and Tsakonas are curating a traveling version of the exhibition Eucalypts of Hodogaya, which opened in April at the Yokohama Archives of History.

== Selected works ==
- Hidden Hands and Divided Landscapes (University of Hawaii Press, 2009) - ISBN 9780824833541
- Architecture and Nationalism in Sri Lanka (Routledge, 2012) - ISBN 9780203074831
- Sovereignty, Space and Civil War in Sri Lanka (Routledge, 2018) - ISBN 9781351246347
- Architecture on the Borderline (ed.) (Routledge, 2019) - ISBN 9781138102828
