= Dutch Burgher Union of Ceylon =

Sri Lankan community group

Dutch Burgher Union
- Dutch Burgher Union of Ceylon
- Hollandsche Burgher Vereeniging van Ceylon
- Founded: 18 January 1908; 118 years ago
- Headquarters: 114 Reid Avenue, Colombo 00400; 6.897135°N 79.859226°E
- Location: Sri Lanka
- Website: thedutchburgherunion.org

The Dutch Burgher Union of Ceylon (abbreviated as: DBUC; Dutch: Hollandsche Burgher Vereeniging van Ceylon), known commonly as the Dutch Burgher Union (DBU), is an organisation of Dutch Burghers in Sri Lanka. It was established on 18 January 1908 by Richard Gerald Anthonisz.

== History ==
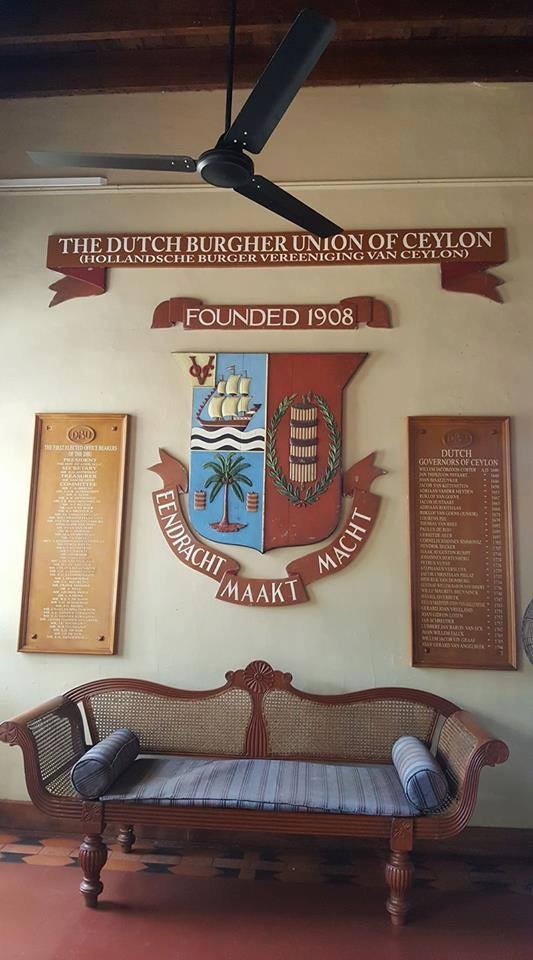
The memorial plaques at the Dutch Burgher Union building, Colombo

On 12 November 1907 Richard Anthonisz organised a preliminary meeting of men and women of the Dutch Burgher community at the Lindsay School Hall in Bambalapitiya to consider the establishment of a Dutch Burgher Union. A small committee was appointed to draft a constitution for the union. The inaugural general meeting of the union was held on 18 January 1908 at the Pettah Public Library, with 267 enrolled members present. At the meeting Frederick Charles Loos, a Proctor and Member of the Legislative Council was elected as the first president of the union, with Anthonisz as Honorary Secretary (a position he retained until 1915). The second president of the union was Henry Lorensz Wendt who, however, died two months after his election and in 1912 was replaced by Fedrick Henry de Vos. In 1913 Sir Hector William van Cuylenburg was elected as the fourth president of the union. In 1916, Anthonisz was elected president, a position he held for fourteen years until his death in 1930.

The first writ described the vision of union, and it stated ".. promote the moral, intellectual and social well-being of the Dutch and Dutch Burgher descendants in Ceylon (Sri Lanka).. and among many others .. the promotion of fellowship, self-help, self-reliance and thrift." Membership of the Dutch Burgher Union was governed by strict genealogical qualifications, with members having to demonstrate an uninterrupted line of patrilineal descent from a European employee of the Dutch East India Company.

Initially, the union sublet two rooms at Sea View, Kollupitiya; the union soon set about raising funds to establish a more permanent accommodation. In 1913, the union acquired land in Cinnamon Gardens on Buller's Road (now Bauddhaloka Mawatha) and Serpentine Road, where it constructed a two-storey building. The ground floor of the building contains a vestibule which leads to a large public room, with a sprung teak floor, which was used for lectures and dances. A carved wooden staircase leads to the upper floor, which houses a billiard room, bar, card rooms, a drawing room and a reading room. There is also a wing containing residential quarters for outstation members and space at the rear of the building which was initially used for horses and carriages and subsequently for car parking. The grounds also contained tennis courts and a netball court. As the suburb developed, the union was forced to sell much of its grounds for new roads and to pay for increasing property rates.

The Dutch Burgher Union still operates in Colombo as a centre for social and community activities. It has been described as a "once a powerful secret society but now only a gloomy billiard hall near Buller Road, draped in dust and cobwebs".

The union manages St Nikolaas' Home (a care home for elderly women of the Burgher community), and the Brohier Memorial Home (for elder men).

== Notability ==
The union has published in excess of 70 volumes of The Journal of the Dutch Burgher Union of Ceylon. The first copy was issued on 31 March 1908 and copies were issued regularly until 1968. No volumes were published between 1968 and 1981, mostly due to the exodus of members of the burgher community from Sri Lanka. The journals contain genealogies of over 200 burgher families, and are considered a valuable resource for researching the community. The journal is now published annually.

The DBU's centenary (1908–2008) was featured on the Sri Lankan 5 rupee stamp.

== List of Dutch Burgher Union Presidents ==
Name	Term
Frederick Charles Loos	1908-1911
Henry Lorensz Wendt	1911
Fedrick Henry de Vos	1912-1913
Sir Hector William van Cuylenburg	1913-1916
Richard Gerald Anthonisz	1916-1930
Dr. L. A Prins	1930-1932
Dr H. U. Leembruggen	1932-1935
E. H. Van der Wall	1935-1936
Dr. Richard Lionel Spittel	1936-1938
J. R. Toussaint	1938-1942
H. K de Kretser	1942-1946
Dr. V. R. S. Schokman	1946-1949
C. A. Speldewinde	1949-1953
Dr. R. L. Brohier	1953-1955
R. S. V. Poulier	1955-1957
James Aubrey Martensz	1957-1959
Dr. E. S. Brohier	1959-1961
Dr. V. H. L. Anthonisz	1961-1962
Dr. H. A. Dirckze	1962-1963
W. J. A. Van Langenberg	1963-1965
Vernon Jonklaas	1965-1966
Brian Jonklaas	1966-1971
C.L. Beling	1971-1972
Leonard Jonklaas	1972-1973
Brian Jonklaas	1973-1978
Justice Percy Colin-Thome	1978-1988
Amyas de Kretser	1988-1989
Harold Speldewinde	1989-1999
Ronald Gray	1999-2000
Godfrey de Kretser (acting)	2000
Deloraine Brohier	2001-2003
Wilhelm Woutersz	2003
Melville Kerkoven (acting)	2003-2004
Kem Martensteyn	2005-2008
Nigel Austin	2008-2011
Timothy Speldewinde	2011-2016
Stephen LaBrooy	2016–2020
David Colin-Thomé	2020-2024
Joachim Caspersz	2024-present

== See also ==
- Catholic Burgher Union
- List of Burgher people
