= The Lady in Red =

The Lady in Red may refer to:

== Music ==
- "The Lady in Red" (Chris de Burgh song), released in 1986
- "The Lady in Red" (Allie Wrubel song), released in 1935
- The Lady in Red (musical), 1919 Broadway musical

== Film ==
- The Lady in Red (1935 film), a Warner Bros. cartoon
- The Lady in Red (1979 film), directed by Lewis Teague

== Literature ==
- Lady in Red, a 2005 novel by Karen Hawkins; the fifth installment in the Talisman Ring series
- The Lady in Red, the American alternative title of Lady Worsley’s Whim: An Eighteenth Century Tale of Sex, Scandal and Divorce, a 2008 non-fiction book by Hallie Rubenhold
- Lady in Red, a 2014 novel by Sheila Quigley; the sixth installment in the Seahills series
- Lady in Red, a 2021 novella by Eliza Knight

== Television ==
- "Lady in Red", Cannon season 4, episode 4 (1974)
- "Lady in Red", Homicide Hunter season 9, episode 9 (2019)
- "Lady in Red", Night Man season 1, episode 9 (1997)
- "Lady in Red", The Red Green Show season 9, episode 3 (1999)
- "The Lady in Red", Dixon of Dock Green series 4, episode 17 (1958)
- "The Lady in Red", Heidi (2015) season 2, episode 13 (2016)
- "The Lady in Red", Jake and the Fatman season 3, episode 2 (1989)
- "The Lady in Red", RejctX season 1, episode 2 (2019)
- "The Lady in Red", Rhoda season 1, episode 5 (1974)

== Other uses ==
- Lady in Red (ghost), a type of female ghost attributed to a prostitute or jilted lover
- Lady in Red (painting), a 1928 painting by A. C. G. S. Amarasekara
- Carmen Sandiego (character), a fictional character nicknamed The Lady in Red
- Jean Hill (1931–2000), witness to the Kennedy assassination known as the Lady in Red
- Karen Briggs (musician), a violinist who picked up the moniker while touring with Yanni

== See also ==
- Red Lady (disambiguation)
- The Woman in Red (disambiguation)
- Scarlet woman (disambiguation)
- "Ladies in Red", an episode of Frankie Drake Mysteries
- The Woman in the Red Dress, a minor character in the movie The Matrix
- Women in Red, a Wikiproject to create new articles about notable women
