= A. C. G. S. Amarasekara =

Sri Lankan painter

Gate Mudaliyar A. C. G. S. Amarasekara OBE
- Born: Abraham Christopher Gregory Sooriyarachchi Amarasekara; 2 March 1883; Dodanduwa, Southern Province, Ceylon
- Died: 29 March 1983 (aged 100); Sri Lanka
- Known for: Painting, drawing
- Movement: Ceylon Society of Arts

Gate Mudaliyar Abraham Christopher Gregory Sooriyarachchi Amarasekara OBE (2 March 1883 – 29 March 1983) was a Sri Lankan painter. He is considered one the important Sri Lanka artists of the Ceylon Society of Arts of the mid 20th century.

Born on 2 March 1883 in Dodanduwa, the son of Rev. Abraham Sooriyarachchi Amarasekera, an Anglican priest, he was educated at the Prince of Wales College, Moratuwa and at the St. Thomas' College, Mutwal, where he was the cartoonist for the hostel magazine “The Dormitory” edited by Francis Molamure. He won first prize at the Ceylon Society of Arts’ annual exhibition in 1903.

After completing his schooling, Amarasekera joined H. W. Cave and Company to study commercial art, then worked at the Survey General's Department as a draughtsman for six years from 1907 and finally joined the staff of the Ceylon Technical College, Maradana as a lecturer in fine arts. Later he founded his own art school, the "Atelier School of Art", which produced many notable artists such as Harry Pieris and Justin Pieris Deraniyagala. He was known for his portraits of the Ceylonese leaders of his time. His works were exhibited at the Royal Academy, the Royal Institute of Painters in Water Colours and the Royal Institute of Oil Painters. In 1919, Amarasekera became the secretary of the Ceylon Society of Arts, its vice-president in 1926 and President in 1959. He was appointed Chairman of the Panel on Painting and Sculpture of Arts Council of Ceylon in 1954. He was an amateur magician with the stage name “Gay Deceiver” and was a founder president of the Association of Ceylon Magicians until his death in 1983. He was responsible for designing the National Art Gallery.

He gained the fellowship of the British Empire Exhibition and was awarded the titular honor of Mudaliyar by the Governor of Ceylon in 1924. Amarasekara was appointed an Officer of the British Empire (OBE) in the 1939 Birthday Honours for his services for the arts in Ceylon. The Government of Ceylon awarded the titular honor of Gate Mudaliyar in 1952 and appointed him the Chairman of the Fine Arts Committee of the Colombo Plan Exhibition. In 1983, Dawson Road in Colombo was renamed "Amarasekara Mawatha" in his honour by President J. R. Jayewardene.

He married Mable Beatrice Pereira in 1908 and they had one son, D. V. A. S. Amarasekara.

== See also ==
- Lady in Red (painting)
