= The Woman in Red =

The Woman in Red may refer to:

== Film ==
- The Woman in Red (1984 film), a 1984 film starring Gene Wilder
- The Woman in Red (soundtrack), produced by Motown
- The Woman in Red (1935 film), a 1935 film starring Barbara Stanwyck
- The Woman in Red (1947 film), a French crime film

== Literature ==
- The Woman in Red (novel), a 1941 novel by Anthony Gilbert
- The Woman in Red, a 1983 novel by Paula Gosling
- Woman in Red, a 2007 novel by Eileen Goudge

== Other uses ==
- "The Woman in Red", Miss Scarlet and the Duke series 1, episode 2 (2020)

=== Fictional characters ===
- Woman in Red (comics), one of the earliest superheroines
- Ana Cumpănaș (Anna Sage), who was nicknamed "the Woman in Red" for the dress she wore when John Dillinger was killed
- Melisandre, a character from the A Song of Ice and Fire fantasy novel series and its television adaptation Game of Thrones, often referred to as "The Red Woman"

== See also ==
- "The Red Woman", an episode from Game of Thrones
- The Woman in the Red Dress, a minor character in the movie The Matrix
- Women in Red, a Wikiproject to create new articles about notable women
- Girl in Red, a Norwegian singer-songwriter (born 1999)
- The Lady in Red (disambiguation)
- Red Lady (disambiguation)
- Scarlet woman (disambiguation)
