= John Silva =

John Silva may refer to:

- Giant Silva (born 1963), Brazilian basketball player and later mixed martial artist and wrestler
- John Silva (tennis) (born 1977), Panamanian tennis player
- John Silva (The Young and the Restless)
- John da Silva (1934–2021), New Zealand wrestler and boxer
- John de Silva (1857–1922), Sri Lankan playwright

== See also ==
- John D'Silva (disambiguation)
