= Vajira Chitrasena =

Sri Lankan traditional dancer (1932–2024)

Deshamanya Vijira Chitrasena
- වජිරා චිත්‍රසේන
- Born: Vajira Perera; 15 March 1932; Galle, British Ceylon
- Died: 23 September 2024 (aged 92); Sri Lanka
- Other name: Vajira Dias
- Education: Methodist College, Colombo; Sri Palee Campus
- Occupations: Dancer, dance teacher
- Organization: Chitrasena-Vajira Dance Foundation
- Known for: first Sri Lankan female Kandyan dancer
- Spouse: Chitrasena (m. 1951 – 2004) (his death)
- Children: Upeka; Anjalika
- Awards: Padma Shri (2020)

Deshamanya Vajira Chitrasena (15 March 1932 – 23 September 2024) was a Sri Lankan traditional dancer, choreographer and teacher. Vajira is regarded as Sri Lanka's first prima ballerina. She is the first Sri Lankan woman to practise the traditional Kandyan dance which was traditionally performed only by men. Vajira is credited with creating brand for a female style of Kandyan dancing and setting the tone for women to become ritual dancers. She was married to Chitrasena who was a well known legendary dancer and dance guru.

On 26 January 2020, she along with late professor Indra Dassanayake was conferred with the Padma Shri award which is one of the highest Indian civilian awards coinciding with the 71st Republic Day of India.

== Biography ==
Vajira was born on 15 March 1932 and was introduced to the arts at a very young age by her parents, especially her mother, Lilian. She completed her primary and secondary education at the Methodist College, Colombo. Her sisters including Vipuli and the oldest sister were also dancers. Vajira's mother sent Vajira to Sri Palee in Horana, to study dancing.

In 1951, at the age of 18, she married her fellow dance partner, the late Chitrasena. Her husband had founded the Chitrasena Dance Company in 1943. They had two daughters, Upeka and Anjalika.

Vajira Chitrasena died in September 23, 2024, at the age of 92.

== Career ==
Vajira's first domestic solo performance came in 1943 on stage at the Kalutara Town Hall. She and her husband Chitrasena co-founded the Chitrasena-Vajira Dance Foundation in 1944 and both toured India on several occasions between 1959 and 1998 to collaborate with artistes from different genres. Vajira and Chitrasena were known for their close bond with India and for their contributions in strengthening the ties between the two countries in the field of arts. She made her debut as soloist in the role of Prakriti in the ballet 'Chandali' in 1952. Her rise to stardom was coupled with unswerving discipline and dedication not only as a teacher, but as a performer and a choreographer as well, even as she illumined her husband's career.

She also choreographed several acclaimed productions and also taught dance to students for over 60 years. She taught teaching to a few prominent actresses such as Nilmini Tennakoon and Jeevarani Kurukulasuriya.

== Honours ==
The duo Vajira and Chitrasena were awarded the Eagle Award of Excellence in 2004 by the Eagle Insurance for their outstanding contributions to art. She was felicitated by the High Commission of India on her 81st birthday on 15 March 2013.

She was announced as an honourable recipient of the Padma Shri award for her achievement in arts in January 2020 and the award was given by Indian President Ram Nath Govind during the Padma Awards Investiture Ceremony which was held on 8 November 2021. It was also the first instance when a Sri Lankan had been honoured with the Padma Shri award since 2002. On 17 November 2021, she was felicitated in the Indian High Commission with the Padma Shri award in a ceremony which was held in the Temple Trees.
