= John D'Silva (disambiguation) =

John D'Silva, or variant spellings, may refer to:

- John D' Silva, Indian Konkani actor
- John da Silva (1934–2021), New Zealand wrestler and boxer
- John de Silva (1857–1922), Sri Lankan playwright
- John DeSilva (born 1967), American baseball player
- Johnathan Aparecido da Silva (born 1990), Brazilian footballer
- Jon Dasilva (born 1963), British DJ and producer
- Bertie de Silva (John Albert de Silva, 1901–1981), Ceylonese cricketer and forester

== See also ==
- John Silva (disambiguation)
- John da Silva Antao (born 1933), priest
- John D. Silva (1920–2012), American engineer
