= Ivan Peries =

Sri Lankan artist and painter (1921-1988)

Ivan Peries (31 July 1921 – 13 February 1988) was a founder member of the Colombo '43 Group of Sri Lankan artists, and became one of its leading painters. Born near Colombo, he spent more than half his life in self-imposed exile in London and Southend-On-Sea, but his art remained to the end a prolonged meditation on his native Sri Lankan experience.

Peries' subjects, repeatedly rural life and the ocean shoreline, were of 'a world neither ancient nor modern, clearly recognisable, strangely, hauntingly meaningful and yet ultimately outside the natural experience'. The subject of Ivan Peries' paintings, considered alongside his cultural dislocation, have made him an important post-colonial artist, and a key figure in the origins of contemporary Sri-Lankan art.

== Early life ==
Peries grew up in Dehiwela, on the Western shore of Sri Lanka, looking towards the Laccadive sea. His father Dr. James Francis Peries had studied medicine in Scotland, and his mother Ann Gertrude Winifred Jayasuria was a graduate of St. Bridget's Convent in Colombo. Ivan's brother Lester James Peries was a leading Sri Lankan film director. The Peries family was a Roman Catholic family that had become anglicized. Ivan was fluent in English from childhood.

== Training and early work ==
Ivan Peries leant towards art as a vocation from a young age, and was a recognised artist by the age of 20. He refused his parents’ offer to take an academic university degree. Photographer Lionel Wendt recommended Harry Pieris as Ivan’s teacher. Harry Pieries became mentor and friend to Ivan. In 1941 Wendt bought Peries’ ‘Homage to El Greco’.

Ivan Peries was part of a community of progressive, intellectual Sri-Lankan artists. They included Justin Daraniyagala, George Keyt, Aubrey Collette, George Claessen, WJG Beling, LTP Manjusri, Richard Gabriel, Walter Witharne, and YJ Thuring.

His character at this time was ‘excited and tense, [acting] on the spur of the moment’. In the early 1940s he was ‘frantically engaged in a shuttle service, meeting one artist or another – Harry, Beling, Collette. He went all the way to Nugedola to meet Justin, then back to Lionel Wendt, who was respected by all’. In 1943, Wendt orchestrated a meeting of the artists along with Harry Pieris, with Ivan doing ‘the spade work’. These few Sri Lankan artists named themselves the '43 Group, after the year. They admired other such groups as the Surrealists and wanted recognition for a style of painting that had many influences but few restrictions, such as had been imposed on them by the Ceylonese Society of Arts.

In 1946 Peries won a government scholarship to the St John's Wood School of Art in London, to train for a further 4 years. During this time he produced a number of panel studies, mainly portraits, figures and nudes. He returned to Sri Lanka in 1949, and painted ‘The Bathers’, hinting at Cézanne.

British diplomat Martin Russell was patron to the 43 Group from its inception, buying all works exhibited by Keyt in one exhibition, and many works by Ivan Peries in the 1940s, financing his flat in London during the scholarship on the condition that Russell have first call on any paintings Peries sold.

== London ==
Ivan moved to England's capital in 1953. The following years saw the production of three major paintings: The Wave (1955), The Return (1956) and The Arrival (1959–60).

Professor Qadri Ismail postulates that: ‘The problem with Ivan Peries was that he could not be dismissed with a convenient critical phrase or be put out of the way with an easy tag. He was mercurial and so too did his work have that quality. Until the last years of his life…[his] paintings had the air of a whim or fancy…All sorts of things stimulated his imagination: color…shapes…mystery, as in the deep forebodings of the sea and the rumblings of a monsoon equally full of awe, as in the painting known as The Return. There is stark realism in the anxiety with which the family awaits the return of the men gone out to sea.’

Looking through Peries’ process in his works, according to Prof. Ashley Halpe, ‘gives one a richer sense of the complexity of cultural being in a post colonial context and helps to define the heroism of the artist’s triumph over disjuncture and psychic disturbance, enhancing, if that were possible, the capacity of the paintings.’

== Later years ==
Ivan and his wife Veronica (née) Perry (m. 1955) settled in Southend-on-Sea, with their four children.

Professor Senake Bandaranayake considered Peries' later work: ‘the product of a purely painterly meditation on the painter's indigenous experience. His mature work displays that fine control over feeling and technique that is present in all his work. Influences have already been completely absorbed and digested; they are operative as far as the entire convention of landscape within which the picture exists. Now in his full maturity, yet sufficiently removed in time to have absorbed and digested his experience, Peries has completely mastered his vision and his material.’

== Influences ==
‘Like every painter, Peries learned from others: Piero della Francesca, Angelico and El Greco, Matisse, Cézanne and many more', say Senake Bandaranayake and Manel Fonseka in their essential account; and even from some who didn’t paint, like Lionel Wendt, postulated Professor Qadri Ismail.

== Public locations of Ivan Peries’ works ==
Sri Lanka: The Sapumal Foundation, and Anton Wickremasinghe collection in Colombo. The Victoria and Albert Museum and Imperial War Museum in London, and the Petit Palais in Paris.
