= Winzer (surname) =

Vinzor (winemaker) is a German occupational surname. Notable people with the surname include:

- Charles Freegrove Winzer (1886–1940), British painter, active in Sri Lanka
- Friedrich Albrecht Winzer (1763–1830), German inventor
- Hugo Winzer (1862–1937), German pair skater
- Otto Winzer (1902–1975), East German diplomat
