= Red Lady =

Red Lady may refer to:

- Red Lady of El Mirón, a female paleolithic skeleton
- Red Lady of Paviland, a male paleolithic skeleton
- Red Lady of Huntingdon College, a ghost
- The Red Lady (1920), a novel by Katharine Newlin Burt

== See also ==
- The Lady in Red (disambiguation)
- The Woman in Red (disambiguation)
- Scarlet woman (disambiguation)
- The Woman in the Red Dress, a minor character in the movie The Matrix
- Women in Red, a Wikiproject to create new articles about notable women
