= Arthur van Langenberg =

Sri Lankan public servant, painter and actor

Arthur van Langenberg MBE
- Born: 12 April 1909; Colombo, Ceylon
- Died: September 1970 (aged 61); Hendon, Middlesex, England
- Known for: Painting, drawing
- Movement: Colombo '43 Group

Arthur van Langenberg MBE (12 April 1909 – September 1970) was a Sri Lankan public servant, painter and actor. He is considered one the important Sri Lanka artists of the Colombo '43 Group of the 20th century.

Born on 12 April 1909 the fourth son of James Van Langenberg, Solicitor General of Ceylon (1912–1915) and Francis Ethel Vander née Straaten. Arthur van Langenberg graduated from the University of London and joined the Colombo Port Commission, becoming its secretary. He was closely associated with the Colombo '43 Group and was a founder member of the Art Centre Club. In 1953 he was appointed a trustee of the Lionel Wendt Memorial Fund, serving on the board for three years.

He was appointed a Member of the British Empire (MBE) in the 1955 New Year Honours for his services for the Colombo Port Commission.

Van Langenberg died in September 1970 in Hendon, Middlesex, at the age of 61.
