= Justin Pieris Deraniyagala =

Sri Lankan painter (1903–1967)

- Born: 20 July 1903; Colombo, Ceylon
- Died: 24 May 1967 (aged 63); Pasyala, Ceylon
- Education: S. Thomas' College, Mount Lavinia, Trinity College, Cambridge, Slade School of Fine Art
- Occupation: painter

Justin Pieris Deraniyagala (20 July 1903 – 24 May 1967) was a Sri Lankan painter. Deraniyagala was a founder member of the Colombo '43 Group of Sri Lankan artists and along with Lionel Wendt, George Keyt and Harold Peiris.

Born on 20 July 1903 in Colombo, to Sir Paul Edward Pieris, civil servant and scholar, and Lady Hilda Obeyesekere Pieris, he had a brother Paules Edward Pieris Deraniyagala, a zoologist who became the director of the National Museum of Ceylon and a sister Miriam Pieris Deraniyagala, a performing artist in her own right; her son is the Sri Lankan cellist Rohan de Saram. Deraniyagala was educated at S. Thomas' College, Mount Lavinia, received his art training at Atellier Art School under Mudaliyar A.C.G.S. Amaraseker, at the Training College under Bergen and C.F. Winzer. In 1921, he entered Trinity College, Cambridge, graduating in 1924 with a BA having read law. At Cambridge, Deraniyagala won blues at Bantam Weight Boxing. He went on to Slade School of Fine Art, winning the first prize for drawing in 1928.

He spent the next few years in London and in Paris studying and working, where he was influenced by the works of Pablo Picasso, Henri Matisse and Georges Braque. He returned to Ceylon in 1935, and worked for the British Museum on Ceylon antiquities and with Bronisław Malinowski. He was elected vice president of the Ceylon National Committee of International Association of Art. He developed his style, focused on the human figure, usually female. One of his notable paintings was The Blue Nude of the American-born French entertainer Josephine Baker. In 1943, he with like-minded artists formed the Colombo '43 Group, and had his paintings on display in London and Venice in the 1950s. The art critic John Berger, described Deraniyagala as a philosopher painter.

Deraniyagala never married. He died on 24 May 1967, aged 64 at his family home, Nugedola Wallauwa in Pasyala in the Gampaha District.
