= Geoffrey Beling =

Sri Lankan artist and educator (1907-1992)

William James Geoffrey Beling
- Born: 22 September 1907; Gampola, Sri Lanka
- Died: 29 March 1992 (aged 84); Colombo, Sri Lanka
- Education: Sir Jamsetjee Jeejebhoy School of Art
- Spouse: Edith Maria Angela Anthonisz Deutrom

William James Geoffrey Beling (22 September 1907 - 29 March 1992) was a Sri Lankan artist, educator and one of the founding members of the Colombo '43 Group.

== Biography ==
William James Geoffrey Beling was born in Gampola on 22 September 1922, the first son of William Wright Beling II, a Ceylonese watercolorist, and Eleanor Frances Morgan Swan, a music teacher.

In 1926 he went to India to study to study architecture and art at Bombay's Sir Jamsetjee Jeejebhoy School of Art. In 1928, due to the untimely death of his father, Beling gave up his studies and returned home. He then opened a private art school in Havelock Town and started exhibiting his paintings at the Art Club shows arranged by Charles Freegrove Winzer, Chief Inspector of Art. In 1930 at the Ferguson Hall, Union Place, the photographer Lionel Wendt organised Beling and fellow artist George Keyt's first exhibition. Critics considered the art ‘manifestly ridiculous and degrading’, however Pablo Neruda, the Chilean poet, wrote in the Times of Ceylon that "true artists are rare in Ceylon. There are two exceptions". The exhibition also included works by Winzer, to whom Keyt and Beling were pupils.

Beling painted mainly landscapes, still-lifes and portraits. According to Albert Dharmasiri, "Beling was fascinated by the pictorial innovation of Cubism developed by Braque and Picasso." with his paintings from the early 1930s bearing "a striking similarity to those of Keyt in the use of pure colour, simplification of forms to their basic volumes, and the faceting of objects." Winzer wrote, "Beling's landscapes are admirably constructed and his handling of the endless variety of greens seen in tropical nature is an achievement in itself. His figures are more angular than those of Keyt, and their movements less varied. Both, however, in their efforts are at one to express volume and construction in their canvasses - qualities in which modern art, in Asia, particularly India, is so deficient".

In 1932 following Winzer's retirement he was appointed the Chief Inspector of Art, a role in which he actively promoted both western and eastern art in schools throughout the country until he retired in 1967. His duties meant he had less time for his own painting and stopped painting completely around 1945.

Beling also prepared the original designs of the Lionel Wendt Memorial Arts Complex in Colombo.

In March 2008 'Sketchbook: An Exhibition of the Beling Family to commemorate the 100th birth year of Geoffrey Beling' was hosted at the Sapumal Foundation in Colombo. Along with Beling's works of art, it also showcased sketches and paintings by his father, W. W. Beling.

=== Family life ===
On 14 May 1941 he married Edith Maria Angela Anthonisz Deutrom (1917-?), the daughter of Percival Lawerence Anthonisz Deutrom and Anna Edith, at the Gospel Tabernacle in Wellawatte. They had four children, Geoffrey Paul (20 July 1942), Christopher David (19 January 1944), Cynthia Ruth (29 November 1945) and Mary Anne (21 October 1959).
