= Charles Freegrove Winzer =

British painter

- Born: 1886; Warsaw
- Died: 1940; Warneford Hospital
- Occupations: Painter, lithographer, illustrator
- Relatives: Alice Winzer

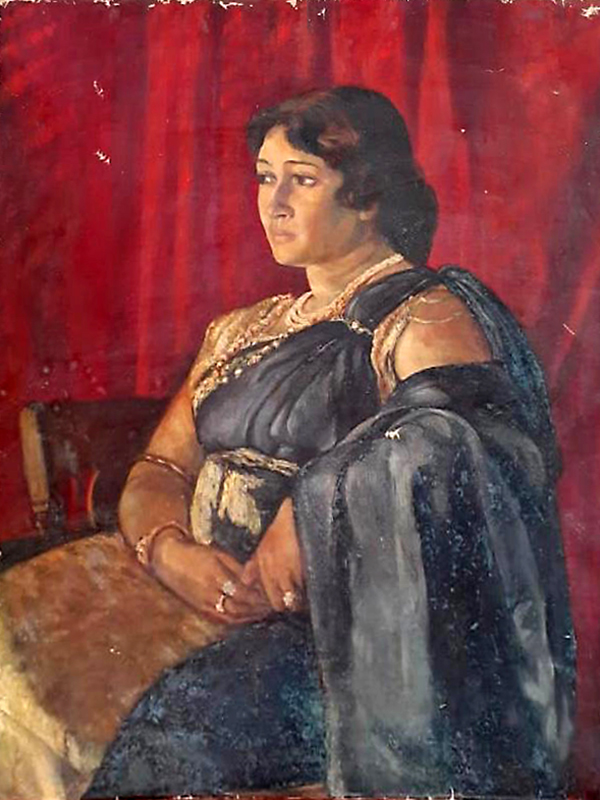
Portrait of a Woman (Henrietta De Fonseka)

Charles Henry D. Freegrove Winzer (1886–1940) was a British painter and lithographer. He lived in Paris, and was interned by Germany in World War I. Afterwards, he worked in Sri Lanka, until retirement to Vienna. He is widely regarded as a leading light in the introduction of modern art to Sri Lanka.

== Early life ==
Winzer was born in Warsaw in 1886 to Leonie Mary (née Lesser) and Julius Charles Winzer, a British diplomat of German descent, and was educated there and in London. (Note: Some sources erroneously give his birthplace as London, where his birth was registered)

He moved to Paris, where he became a close friend of Matisse.

== Career ==
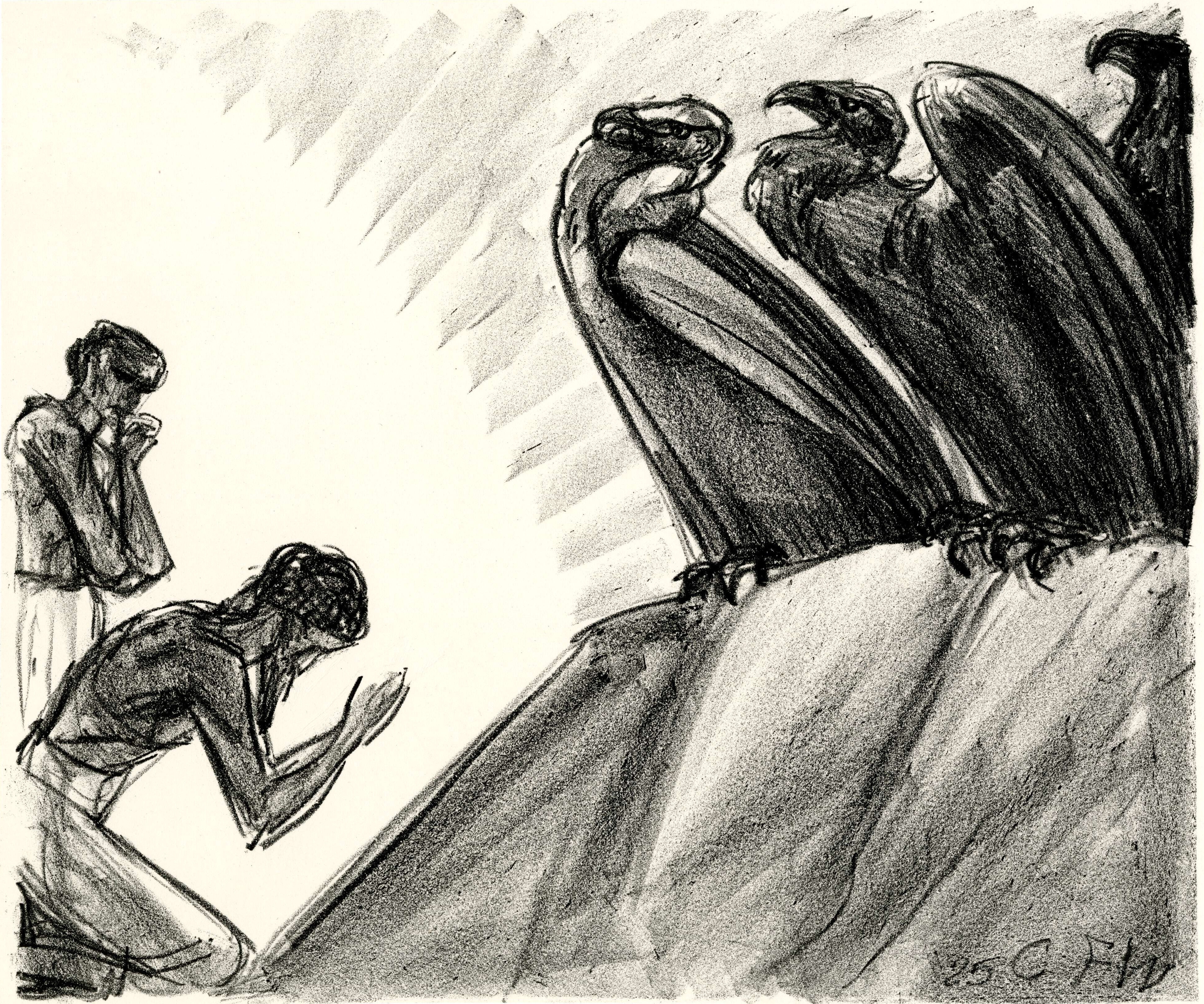
Jaimini and the birds (1925)

From 1909 he exhibited at the Salon d’Automne in Paris. His "distraught sketches" were exhibited alongside the work of the Camden Town Group at the Carfax Gallery in 1912. He had a solo exhibition at the Ashnur Gallery in 1914.

His sister, Alice, married his friend and fellow artist, the German Götz von Seckendorff. In 1914, during World War I, Seckendorff was killed in action. Winzer, who at the time was living in Paris and working for the French Red Cross, applied for permission to visit Alice in Germany, which the military authorities there granted. However, he was detained while attempting to leave Germany, and was interned at Ruhleben internment camp. While there, he provided illustrations for the camp magazine.

From 1920, he served as Inspector of Art in the Education Department of the Government of Ceylon (now Sri Lanka). In 1928, he founded the Ceylon Art Club. In 1930, his paintings were included in the Beling and Keyt Exhibition in Colombo, featuring work by George Keyt and Geoffrey Beling, who were his pupils. After retiring from his role in Ceylon, in 1932, he settled in Venice.

During his artistic career, he also worked in Morocco, Spain, India, and Nepal.

== Death and legacy ==
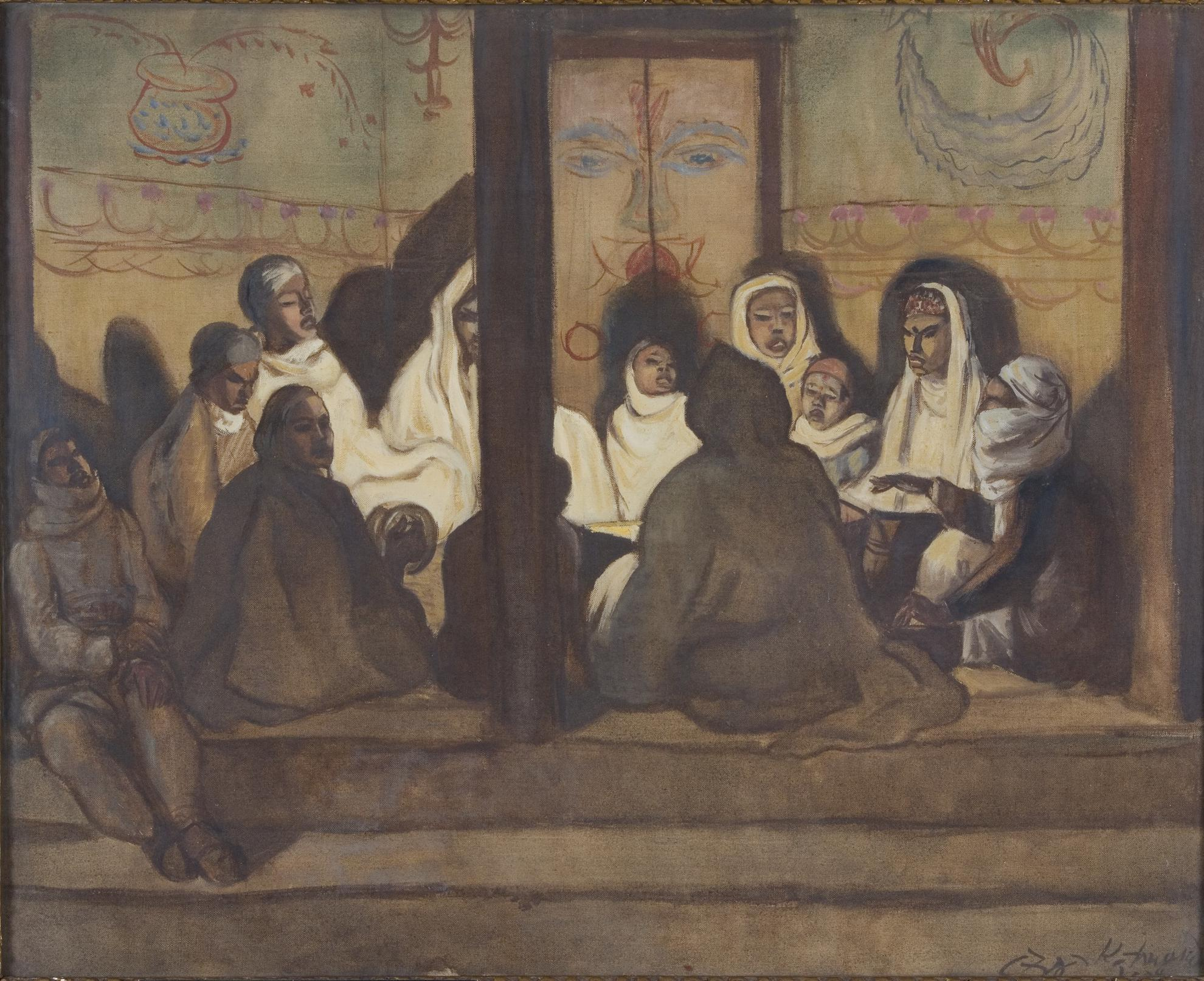
Music for Ganesha

Winzer died at Warneford Hospital, Oxford, on 19 February 1940. The following year, The Winzer Memorial Exhibition of Paintings and Drawings took place at Colombo Art Gallery.

His works are in numerous collections including several lithographs from Ruhleben, now in the Australian War Memorial collection. His 1929 oil painting, Music for Ganesha (or Hymne a Ganesha), is in the National Museum Wales, to whom it was donated by Evan Morgan, 2nd Viscount Tredegar in 1930. Buffaloes and Woman Bathing (1932, lithograph) is in the Fitzwilliam Museum, Cambridge. His portrait in oils of Sir Horace Edmund Avory is owned by Corpus Christi College, University of Cambridge.

Numerous sources credit him as having played a large part in introducing modern art to Ceylon/Sri Lanka, not least through his influence on the "43 Group". Art Ceylon says he "pioneered the development of the modern art movement in Ceylon".; J. F. R. De Fonseka calls him "undoubtedly the father of modern art in Sri Lanka". Shireen Senadhira, writing in Sri Lanka's Sunday Observer, called him "A great contributory factor in the genesis of modern art movement in Sri Lanka... from 1920". Yashodhara Dalmia, in the biography Buddha to Krishna: Life and Times of George Keyt, describes Winzer as "A major contributory factor in the genesis of the modern art movement in Sri Lanka".

== Works illustrated ==
Books illustrated using Winzer's lithographs include:

- Fletker, James Elroy (1921). 14 Poems.
- Johnson, R.F. (1921). Chinese Drama.
