= Upeka Chitrasena =

Sri Lankan dancer

Upeka Chitrasena is a Sri Lankan dancer and dance teacher. Her parents Varija and Chitrasena pioneered the introduction of Sri Lankan ballet in the 1950s. Manori Wijesekera in 2011 called her "Sri Lanka’s finest female dancer", and described her relationship with the drums as unique. At the age of sixty she decided to retire from the stage and to teach full–time.

== Early life ==
As a child, her house in the Colpetty neighborhood of Colombo was often visited by pioneers of modern dance, including Martha Graham and Paul Taylor, during their dance tours. Being raised in that world, Upeka decided to choose the same path. She trained at the Chitrasena School, established by her parents, in order to become a professional dancer. This was the first and only Sri Lankan institution of that time training dancers for the modern stage.

== Career ==
Chitrasena's first stage performance was in 1958, in the children's ballet Vanaja when she was seven years old. Her first lead role was in 1965, in the children's ballet RanKikili at the age of fifteen. In the same year she danced in the ballets Karadiya and Nala Damayanthi, which were the first times that appeared on stage with her parents. After the fulfilment of her education she went on her first world tour in 1971. In 1975 she danced the lead role in Karadiya along with her father, a role which her mother had played for years. In 1978 she danced in the lead role of Kinkini Kolama, a ballet created by her parents for her. Since 2011 she has not had a stage appearance but teaches and mentors young dancers in her dance academy. Her current aim is to build a residential dancing school for children of Sri Lanka to learn dance.

== Personal life ==
Chitrasenahas been married to a director of SOS Children's Villages since 1973, and has no children. She said in a 2002 interview that her husband gave her the opportunity to be focused in her career. She plans to give the leadership of the Chitrasena Vajira Kalayathanaya School to her nephews in the future. First she married Siri Perera who was famous as Singapore Siri and Majic Siri. They were later divorced.
