= Frederick Henry de Vos =

Ceylonese legal practitioner, genealogist and historian (1857–1920)

- Born: 14 September 1857; Galle, Ceylon
- Died: 23 July 1920 (aged 62); Galle, Ceylon
- Occupations: lawyer, genealogist, historian

Frederick Henry de Vos (14 September 1857 – 23 July 1920) was a Ceylonese legal practitioner, genealogist and historian. He was fluent in Dutch, English, French and Flemish and published a number of papers relating to the Dutch East India Company (Verenigde Oostindische Compagnie) involvement in Ceylon.

Frederick Henry de Vos was born in Galle on 14 September 1857, the oldest son of sixteen children, to Frederick William de Vos (1829-1883), a proctor of the Supreme Court of Ceylon, and his second wife, Henrietta Dorothea née Anthonisz (1832-1909), the younger sister of Peter Daniel Anthonisz.

De Vos studied as an undergraduate at St John's College, Cambridge, before enrolling as a student of the Inner Temple on 21 November 1878 (at the age of 21), he was called to the bar on 17 November 1881. Upon his return to Ceylon he was appointed an Advocate of the Supreme Court of Ceylon and as a Justice of the Peace. In April 1903 he was appointed as acting District Judge, Additional Commissioner of Requests and a Visitor of the Prison at Galle.

He served with the Ceylon Light Infantry Volunteers, and was promoted to Lieutenant in 1891, and then Captain.

De Vos was a member of the Society of Dutch Literature, and served as the third president of the Dutch Burgher Union of Ceylon in 1912. He had a fluent knowledge of Dutch and Dutch history, translating and putting together many genealogies of the families of the Dutch Burgher Union. His translation of the Beknopte Historie for the Ceylon Branch of the Royal Asiatic Society is potentially the largest complete work which he authored.

He died in Galle on 23 July 1920, at the age of 62, and is buried at the Galle Dutch Reformed Church.

== Bibliography ==
- de Vos, F. H. (1898). Monumental Remains of the Dutch East India Company in Ceylon.
- de Vos, F. H. (1903). Three Funerals of Ceylon Dutch Officials in the 18th Century.
- de Vos, F. H. (1919). Ceylon and the Hollanders, 1658-1796.
