= R. S. V. Poulier =

Ceylonese statesman and civil servant

Hon. R. S. V. Poulier CBE

Member of Parliament for Appointed member
- In office 12 April 1956 – 7 July 1959
- In office 13 October 1959 – 5 December 1959

Senator of Ceylon
- In office 1953 – April 1956

Personal details
- Born: Reginald Sydney Vernon Poulier; 3 August 1894
- Died: 7 November 1976 (aged 82)
- Party: Independent
- Spouse: Henrietta Amelia née de Vos
- Children: Reginald Fredrick
- Education: Royal College, Colombo, University of London
- Occupation: civil servant, politician

Reginald Sydney Vernon Poulier, CBE (3 August 1894 - 7 November 1976) was a Ceylonese statesman and civil servant.

He was educated at Royal College, Colombo and gained a BA from the University of London. In 1914, he joined the education department and was select the Ceylon Civil Service in 1919 and went on to serve in many appointments including Government Agent of Ratnapura.

On 30 December 1924 he married Henrietta Amelia née de Vos (b. 1905) at All Saints' Church, Galle. They had one son, Reginald Fredrick, born 10 June 1932.

Poulier was appointed a Commander of the Order of the British Empire (CBE) in the 1947 New Year Honours list, for his services as Food Commissioner (Control and Distribution) in Ceylon.

In 1948 following the 1st parliamentary elections Poulier was recruited from the Ceylon Civil Service to a position of Parliamentary Secretary.

In 1953 following his retirement from the Civil Service he was appointed to the Senate of Ceylon on 27 August and in 1956 he resigned from the Senate to take up a position as an appointed member of parliament. In 1958 he was selected to be a member on the Joint Select Committee on the Revision of the Constitution. He was re-appointed as a member of parliament after both the March and July 1960 parliamentary elections. Poulier served as Chairman of Public Accounts Committee from 1960 to 1962.

He served as the Parliamentary Secretary to the Minister of Finance in the First Sirimavo Bandaranaike cabinet, from 28 August 1962 to 6 May 1963, following the resignation of George Rajapaksa.

Poulier also served as the president of the Dutch Burgher Union of Ceylon from 1955 to 1957.
