= Lady in Red (painting) =

Painting by A. C. G. S. Amarasekara

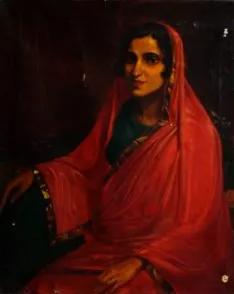
- Artist: A. C. G. S. Amarasekara
- Year: 1928
- Subject: unknown
- Location: National Art Gallery; Sri Lanka

Lady in Red is a half-length portrait painting done in 1928 by Sri Lankan artist Mudaliyar A. C. G. S. Amarasekara, that was accidentally discovered in the National Art Gallery in Cinnamon Gardens, Colombo, Sri Lanka.

The painting remained undiscovered until 2021, when it was found to be hidden under the canvas of a portrait painting of Ananda Samarakoon, also painted by Amarasekara. The subject of the Lady in Red is unknown, but is speculated to be the wife of a politician, a daughter of an ambassador, or perhaps another artist. She is depicted wearing a red sari, with green blouse, and a red wedding band.

== Discovery ==
In 2021, the National Art Gallery of Sri Lanka, located in the affluent Cinnamon Gardens neighborhood of the capital city Colombo, was undergoing a project to preserve and restore 239 of its art pieces. From charcoal and watercolor to acrylics and oil paintings, the collection at the gallery spanned two centuries, and a diverse mix of mediums. Due to an insufficient number of experts in the field in Sri Lanka, easel painting conservation expert Jennifer Myers was brought in from the United States to take up the task of working on a national collection of this caliber. Myers was National Endowment for the Humanities Painting Conservation Fellow at the Chrysler Museum of Art in Norfolk, Virginia.

On 11 December 2021 the team was working on a portrait painting of Ananda Samarakoon, painted by A. C. G. S. Amarasekara, when Myers noticed a few inconsistencies with the painting and its canvas. The fabric of the canvas on the front of the painting was different than that of the back. Furthermore, they noticed an odd dust pattern. Due to the painting being done horizontally in landscape orientation, the dust should have been collecting at the bottom of the canvas frame, but had instead collected along the side of the frame.
