= Catholic Burgher Union =

Sri Lankan organisation

Burgher Union
- Catholic Burgher Union
- Successor: Sunny Ockersz
- Founded: 1927
- Location: Sri Lanka
- Members: 2,000

The Catholic Burgher Union is an organisation of Portuguese Burghers (persons of mixed Portuguese and Sri Lankan descent) in the town of Batticaloa, Sri Lanka. In the modern era, the Union played a strong role in the preservation of the Portuguese Burgher culture, despite their economically disadvantaged position.

Researchers in the 1960s noted that the meetings of the Union were still held in Portuguese, with the exception of the minutes, as they were read from written records, and Sri Lankan Portuguese was not used as a written language. In the 1980s, despite Burger immigration to Australia, the Union still numbered some 2,000 speakers of Sri Lankan Portuguese, making them the largest community still speaking the dialect. The Union continued to maintain Portuguese Burgher traditions, including promoting traditional music and dance, By the 2000s (decade), however, the Union was described as struggling financially to be able to produce its English newsletter, with Portuguese extracts.

== See also ==
- Dutch Burgher Union of Ceylon
