= Sri Lankan art =

Visual arts in Sri Lanka refers to a variety of visual art forms, including as painting, drawing, sculpture architecture and other visual arts from the ancient time to modern Sri Lanka. The history of visual art of Sri Lanka has long history, starting from the 2nd or 3rd century BC to the present day.

== History ==
=== Earliest origins ===
Painting and sculpture in Sri Lanka can be traced back to the second and third century BCE.

=== Pre-colonizalism ===
Art during this period blended Buddhist and Hindu iconographies with South Indian designs and pan-Asian symbolism.

=== British colonization (19th century) ===
The 19th century saw art become more commonplace within the middle class.

=== Contemporary Sri Lankan art ===
Some contemporary Sri Lankan art features themes of surrealism.

==== 1980s and 90s ====
Art in Sri Lanka in the 1980s and 1990s featured themes of social and political struggle.

== See also ==
- Kandyan Era Frescoes
