= Henry William Cave =

English photographer and publisher (1854–1913)

Henry William Cave M.A., F.R.G.S., M.R.A.S. (23 February 1854 – 28 October 1913) was a British author, photographer, publisher and amateur archaeologist.

Henry William Cave was born on 23 February 1854 in Brackley, Northamptonshire, the son of William Cave and Louisa née Wilson. He studied at Magdalen College School, and Queen's College, Oxford.

In 1872, at the age of eighteen Cave left his studies at Oxford and travelled to Ceylon, as the private secretary to the Anglican Bishop of Colombo, Reginald Copleston. Cave edited the diocesan magazine, Ceylon Diocesan Gazette, and became interested in publishing, printing and photography. In 1876 he opened a bookstore in Upper Chatham Street, Colombo fort, with the encouragement of the Bishop, mainly selling bibles and religious tracts. By 1884 the business, H. W. Cave and Company, had diversified becoming a well established printing and publishing firm, as well as selling musical instruments and sporting goods (including billiard tables, rickshaws and bicycles). After occupying a site in Janadhipathi Mawatha (formerly Queen's Street), now the Central Bank offices, the company in 1896 moved their offices to the Gaffoor Building on Sir Baron Jayathilaka Mawatha (formerly Prince Street) and the printing presses to an establishment on Justice Akbar Mawatha in Slave Island. In 1918 the company expanded into motor vehicle sales.

He married Laura Emma Long (1856-1885) on 7 February 1880 in Richmond, Surrey, and they had three children, Laura Mary (b.1881), Kathleen Kalani (b.1885), and Cecil Gordon (b.1896). Cave's wife, Emma, died in 1886 when he was just 32 and he returned to England leaving his brothers and a nephew in charge of the business, while he completed his degree and Master of Arts at Oxford.

Cave made seventeen voyages to Ceylon and India, including detailed explorations of the remains of Anuradhapura and Polonnaruwa in 1896.

Between 1893 and 1908, he wrote and published several important books on Ceylon, including a guide to its railways and the tea plantations, all illustrated with his own photographs.

Cave was a fellow of the Royal Geographical Society and a member of the Royal Asiatic Society.

He died on 28 October 1913 in Brighton, Sussex and is buried at Woodvale Cemetery, Brighton.

== Bibliography ==
- Cave, Henry W. (1893). Picturesque Ceylon: Colombo and the Kelani Valley. Vol. 1. London: Samson Low, Marston and Company.
- Cave, Henry W. (1894). Picturesque Ceylon: Kandy and Peradeniva. Vol. 2. London: Samson Low, Marston and Company.
- Cave, Henry W. (1895). Picturesque Ceylon: Nuwara Eliya and Adam's Peak. Vol. 3. London: Samson Low, Marston and Company.
- Cave, Henry W. (1897). The Ruined Cities of Ceylon: Illustrated with photographs taken by the author in the year 1896. London: Samson Low, Marston and Company.
- Cave, Henry W. (1900). Golden Tips: A Description of Ceylon and its Great Tea Industry. London: Samson Low, Marston and Company.
- Cave, Henry W. (1908). The Book of Ceylon: Being a Guide to Its Railway System and an Account of Its Varied Attractions for the Visitor and Tourist. London: Cassell & Co.
- Cave, Henry W. (1909). The Ceylon Government Railway: A Descriptive and Illustrative Guide. London: Cassell & Co.
