= Shelton Premaratne =

Sri Lankan musician (1931–2024)

- ෂෙල්ටන් ප්‍රේමරත්න
- Born: 1931; Ceylon
- Died: 30 May 2024 (aged 94); Sydney, Australia
- Occupations: music composer, instrumentalist and music director

Shelton Premaratne (Sinhala: ෂෙල්ටන් ප්‍රේමරත්න) (1931 – 30 May 2024) was a Sri Lankan music composer, instrumentalist and music director.

== Career ==
Shelton made his mark in Sinhala music at a time when Sinhala music was loosely inspired by tunes from Hindi music and Tamil music from India. He went on to stamp his authority with the introduction of unique music catering to the Sri Lankan audience.

He served as a music director in over 30 stage productions which also include Henry Jayasena’s theatre production Hunuwataye Kathawa (The Caucasian Chalk Circle), and also served as a music composer for at least 21 Sinhala films including Daskon, Romeo Juliet Kathawak and Hithaka Pipunu Mal. He also educated several students about the essence of music and had also contributed to arts and culture in his long career spanning over six decades.

== Discography ==
- Ekamath Eka Rataka (1958)
- Ma Alaya Kala Tharuniya (1959)
- Gehanu Geta (1959)
- Vanamala (1960)
- Daskon (1962)
- Sihina Hathak (1966)
- Hangi Hora (1968)
- Romeo Juliet Kathawak (1969)
- Baduth Ekka Horu (1969)
- Pick Pocket (1969)
- Kalana Mithuro (1971)
- Ma Hene Reeri Yaka (1971)

== Death ==
He died on 30 May 2024 at the age of 94 in Sydney, Australia. The news of his death was confirmed by fellow musician Keerthi Pasquel via a Facebook post.
