= Kandyan dance =

Various dance forms native to Kandy, Sri Lanka

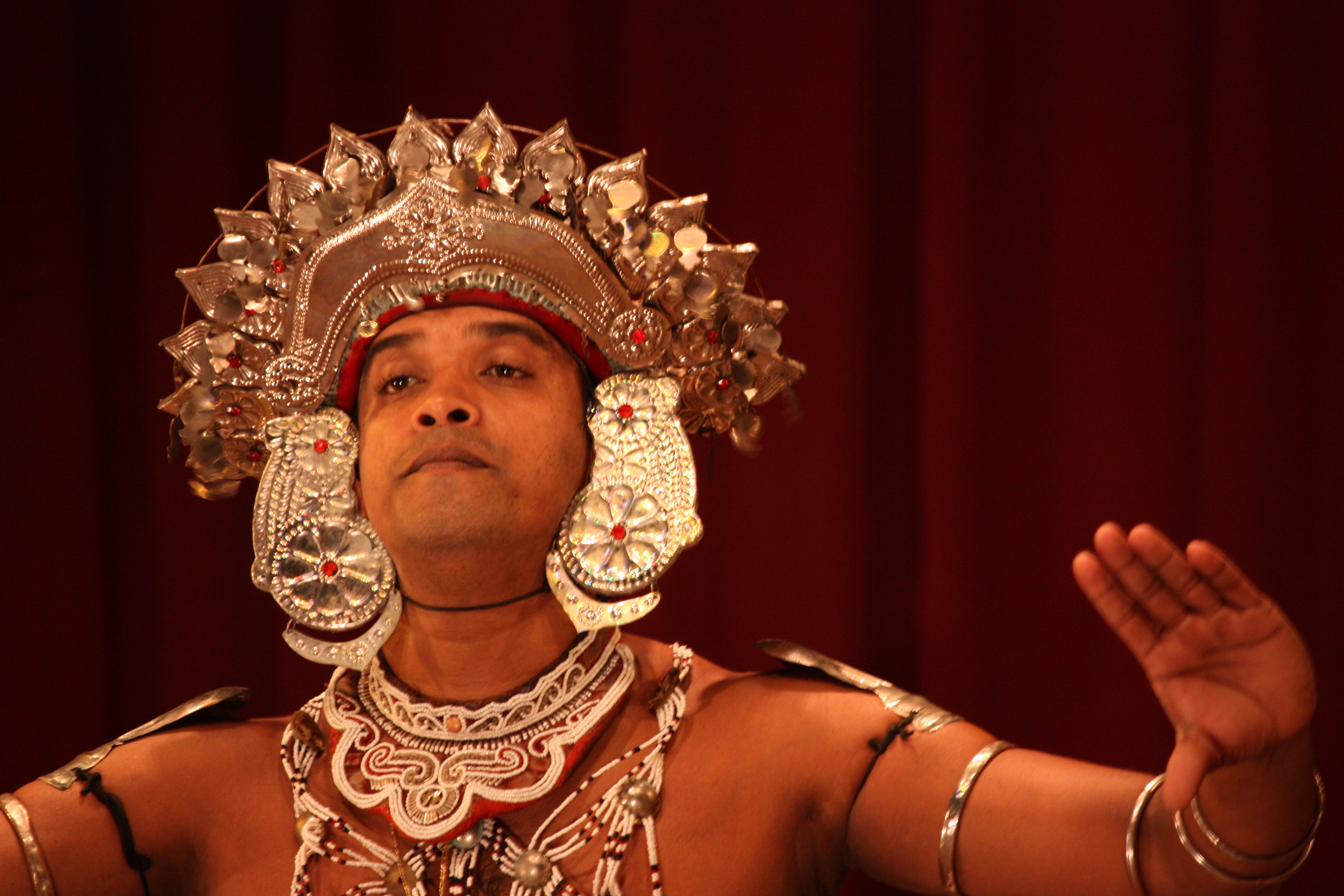
A Kandyan dancer

Kandyan dance (Sinhala: උඩරට නැටුම්) encompasses various dance forms popular and native to the area called Kandy of the Central Hills region known as Udarata in Sri Lanka, which have today spread to other parts of the country. It is an example and considered a masterpiece and a sacred artwork in Sri Lanka.

== History ==
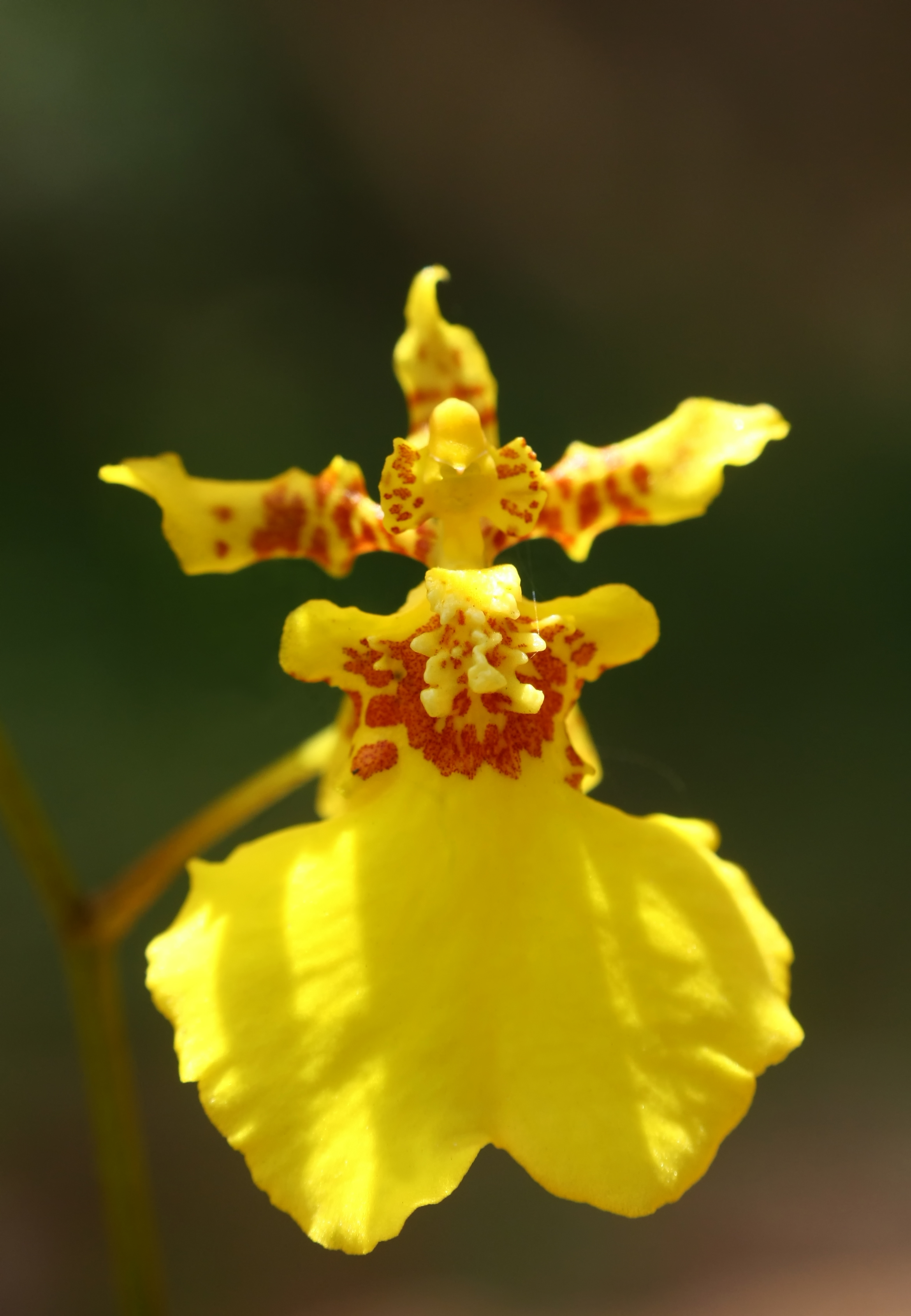
An orchid known as Kandyan Dancer due to its resemblance

=== Ves Dance ===
According to the legend the origin of the dance lies in a dance ritual known as the Kohomba kankariya (named for the deity Kohomba), which is also known as Kohomba yak kankariya or kankariya. Traditional dance masters believe that originally the king of a place referred to as "Malaya Rata", and his two brothers performed the first Kohomba kankariya. Some believe that this "Malaya Rata" was located in India.

According to legend, King Malaya came to the island as a result of a trick of the god Śakra in order to cure the king, Panduwasdev, who was suffering from a mysterious illness. The king was said to be suffering from a recurring dream in which a leopard was directing its tongue towards the king, believed to be as black magic of Kuveni, the first wife of King Vijaya. After the performance of the Kohomba kankariya the illness vanished, and many natives adopted the dance.

It was originally performed by dancers who were identified as a separate caste under the Kandyan feudal system. They were aligned to the Temple of the Tooth and had a significant role to play in the Dalada Perahera procession held each year by the temple.

The dance waned in popularity as the support for the dancers from the Kandyan kings ended during the British period. It has now been revived and adapted for the stage and is Sri Lanka's primary cultural export.

Ves dance, the most popular, originated from an ancient purification ritual, the Kohomba yakuma or Kohomba kankariya. The dance was propitiatory, never secular, and performed only by males. The elaborate Ves costume, particularly the headgear, is considered sacred and is believed to belong to the deity Kohomba.

Only toward the end of the 19th century were Ves dancers first invited to perform outside the precincts of the Kankariya Temple at the annual Kandy Perahera festival. Today the elaborately costumed Ves dancer epitomizes Kandyan dance, which highlights Sri Lanka's culture.

=== Naiyandi dance ===
Dancers in Naiyandi costume perform during the initial preparations of the Kohomba Kankariya festival, during the lighting of the lamps and the preparation of foods for the demons. The dancer wears a white cloth and white turban, beadwork decorations on his chest, a waistband, rows of beads around his neck, silver chains, brass shoulder plates, anklets, and jingles; same as the costume of the Ves dancer except for the head-dress. This is a graceful dance, also performed in Maha Visnu (Vishnu) and Kataragama Devales temples on ceremonial occasions.

=== Udekki dance ===
The Udekki dance is a very prestigious performance. Its name comes from the Udekki, a small lacquered hand drum in the shape of an hourglass, about 7.5 inches (18 cm) high, believed to have been given to people by the gods. The two drum skins are believed to have been given by the god Iswara, and the sound by Visnu; the instrument is said to have been constructed according to the instructions of Sakra and was played in the heavenly palace of the gods. It is a very difficult instrument to play. The dancer sings as he plays, tightening the strings to obtain variations of pitch.

=== Pantheru dance ===
The Pantheruwa is an instrument dedicated to the goddess Pattini. It resembles a tambourine (without the skin) and has small cymbals attached at intervals around its circumference. The dance is said to have originated in the days of Prince Siddhartha, who became Buddha. The gods were believed to use this instrument to celebrate victories in war, and Sinhala kings employed Pantheru dancers to celebrate victories on the battlefield. The costume is similar to that of the udarata dancer, but the Pantheru dancer wears no beaded jacket and substitutes a silk handkerchief at the waist for the elaborate frills of the udarata dancer.

=== Weeramunda Kankariya ===
Weeramunda Kankariya and Kande Deviyan Pidima (the evening ritual for the god of the mountain) could be identified as the ceremonial dances rooted in folk beliefs of Kandyan Dewa (people)

=== Vannam ===
Originally a vannam (or wannam) was a kind of recitation. Most vannam describe the behaviour of animals such as elephants, monkeys, rabbits, peacocks, cocks, serpents etc. Later dancers have used the vannam as a background song for their performance. There are 18 vannam in the Kandyan dance form. Traditionally a dancer would have to learn to perform all of these vannam before they would be gifted the Ves costume. The most well known among these are the hanuma vannama (monkey), The ukusa vannama (Eagle) and the gajaga vannama (elephant).

The word vannam comes from the Sinhala word varnana ('descriptive praise'). Ancient Sinhala texts refer to a considerable number of vannam that were only sung; later they were adapted to solo dances, each expressing a dominant idea. History reveals that the Kandyan king Sri Weeraparakrama Narendrasinghe gave considerable encouragement to dance and music. In this kavikara maduwa (a decorated dance arena) there were song and poetry contests.

It is said that the kavi (poetry sung to music) for the eighteen principal vannam were composed by an old sage named Ganithalankara, with the help of a Buddhist priest from the Kandy temple. The vannam were inspired by nature, history, legend, folk religion, folk art, and sacred lore, and each is composed and interpreted in a certain mood (rasaya) or expression of sentiment. The eighteen classical vannam are,

- Gajaga Wannama (elephant)
- Thuranga Wannama (horse)
- Mayura Wannama (peacock)
- Gahaka Wannama (conch shell)
- Uranga Wannama (crawling animals)
- Mussaladi Wannama (hare)
- Ukkussa Wannama (eagle)
- Vyrodi Wannama (precious stone)
- Hanuma Wannama (monkey)
- Savula Wannama (rooster)
- Sinharaja Wannama (lion king)
- Nayyadi Wannama (cobra)
- Kirala Wannama (red-wattled lapwing)
- Eeradi Wannama (arrow)
- SurapathiWannama (in praise of the leader of gods Sakra)
- Ganapathi Vannama (in praise of the god Ganapathi)
- Uduhara Vannama (expressing the pomp and majesty of the king)
- Assadhrusa Vannama (extolling the merit of Buddha).

To these were added,

- Samanala Vannama (butterfly)
- Mahabo Vannama (the sacred bo tree, Ficus religiosa, at Anuradhapura, said to be a sapling of the original Bodhi Tree under which Buddha attained enlightenment),
- Hansa vannama (swan).

The vannama dance tradition has seven components.

== Costume ==
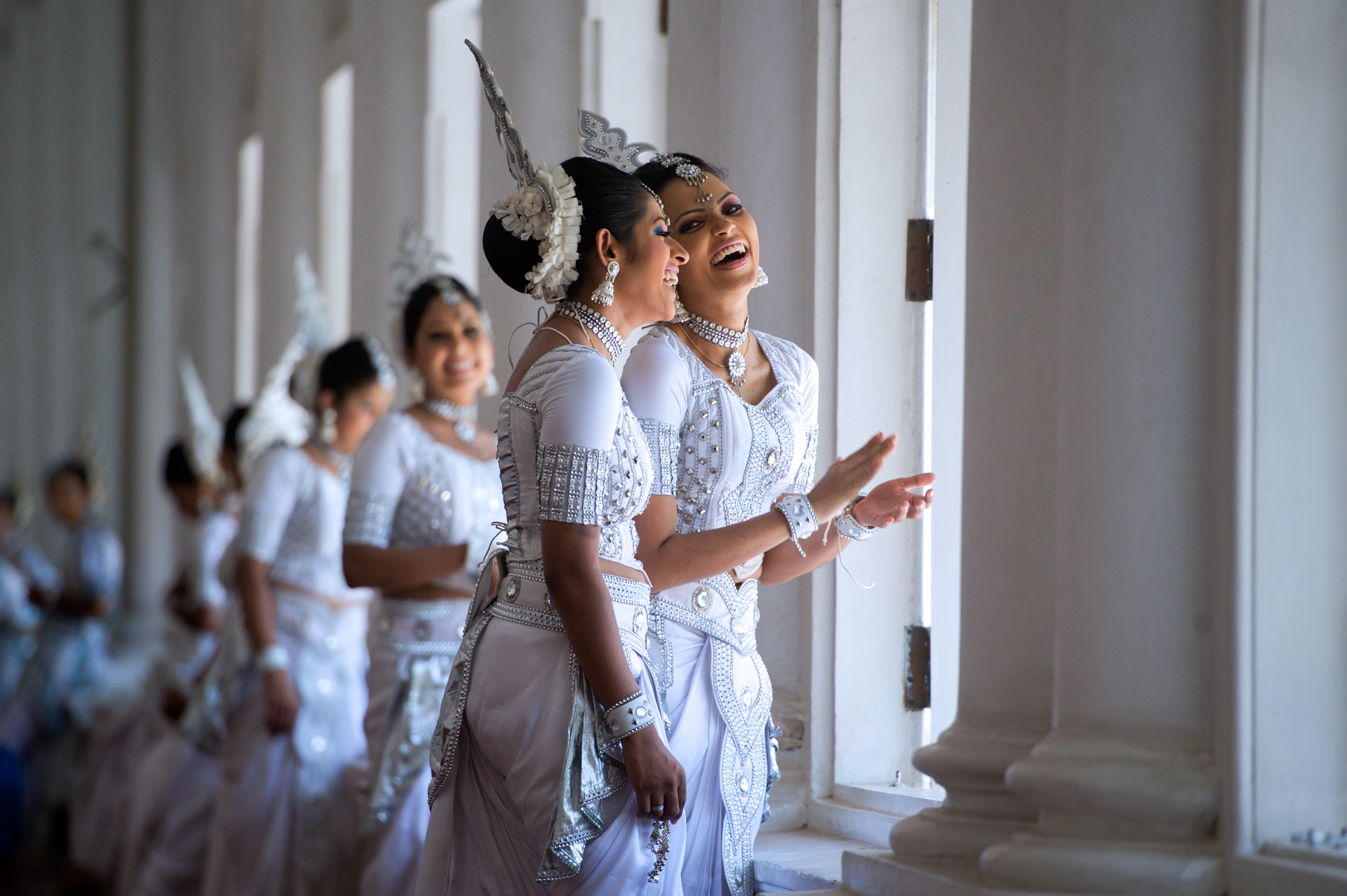
Dancers in costume for a traditional Kandyan Dance

The dancers wear elaborate costumes including a headdress. The dancer's chest is only covered by a decorative beaded net. This costume is known as the Ves costume. The headdress incorporates a metallic front which makes the dancer look taller than he is. The complete costume also includes anklets that produce a metallic rattle each

The headgear in the Ves costume can only be worn by the males and can only be worn after a special ceremony called Ves mangalaya in which the male dancer first wears the Ves costume and dances. Legend says that if a female wears the headgear she will have a lot of bad luck or be ill. This even applies to males who have not performed at the Ves mangalaya.

Males only perform at the Ves mangalaya but females have a separate ceremony called Kala Eli mangalya.

== Music ==
Thammattama drummer

The Kandyan Dance is traditionally performed to percussion only. The most common drum is the Geta Beraya, which is only used in Kandyan Dance. To assist the dancer to keep rhythm a small pair of cymbals known as the Thalampota is also used. The Vannam's however have lyrics that are sung in tune with the movements of the dancer. These lyrics sing about the virtues of the animal that the Vanna is depicting.

Another form of twin drums called Thammattama used with cane drum sticks.

== Kandyan dance today ==
Even though originally only males were allowed to train as dancers, there are now several schools that also train women in the Kandyan dance form. However, there is no definite Ves costume for women, and many female dancers have adapted the male costume in different ways.

There are only a few performances of the Kohomba Kankariya now due to many social, economic and political reasons. The dance in its traditional form is still performed each year at the Dalada Perhahera in Kandy.

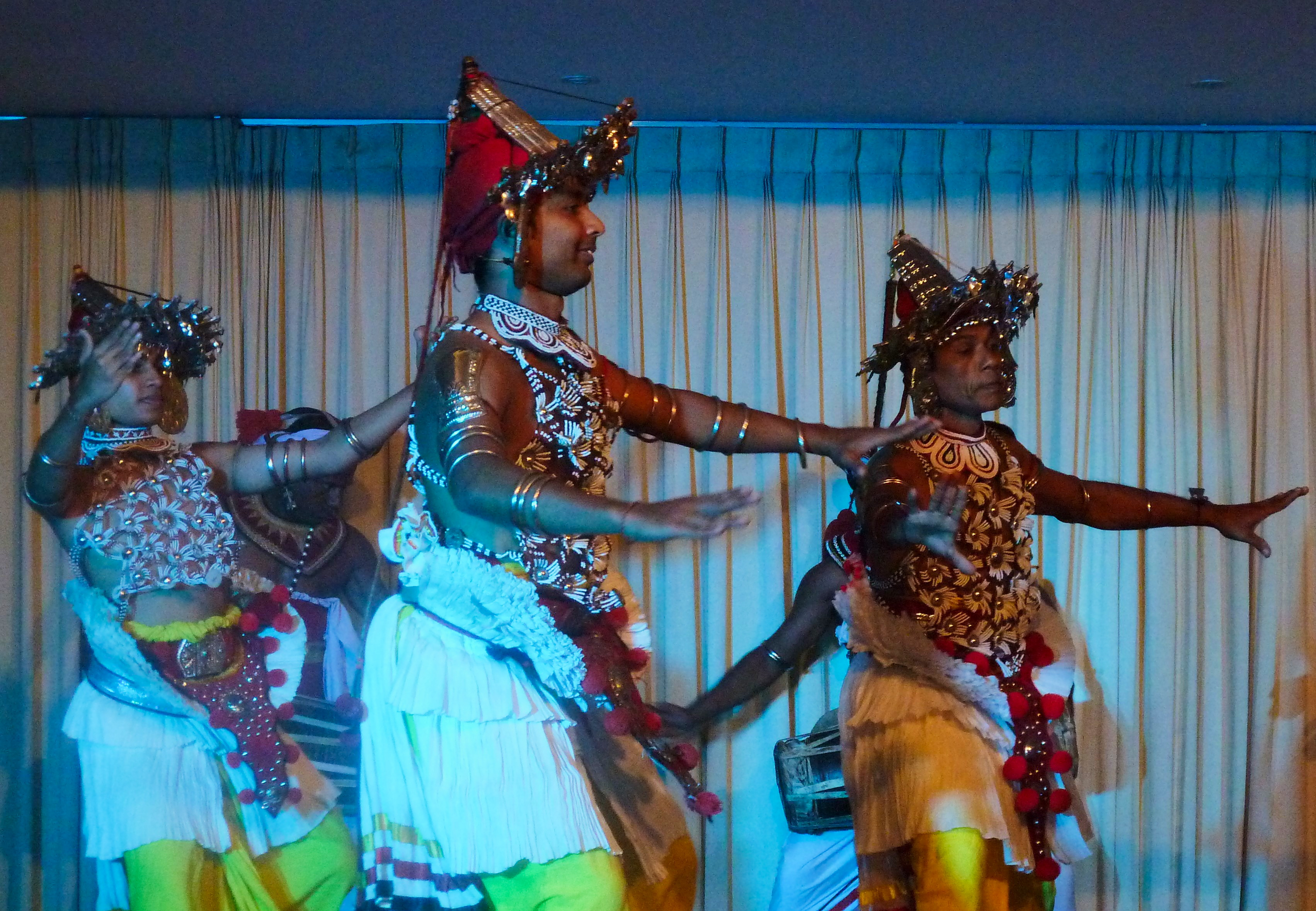
Kandy Ves Natuma costume

Kandyan dance was adapted for the stage by Chitrasena Dias in the 1970s. In several ballets he choreographed, he has used Kandyan dance movements and features. In some ways, his popularity also helped to reduce the caste barriers surrounding the dance and made it more palatable to an urban, contemporary audience. To date one of the largest school for Kandyan dance is Chitrasena Dance School. Traditional and ritual Kandyan dance is still taught in some village dance schools like Madyama Lanka Nritya Mandalaya, Tittapajjala kalayatanaya in Kandy area. From about the 1920s, artists such as George Keyt, Harold Peiris, Lionel Wendt and John de Silva also helped to popularise the dance form with their support of contemporary masters such as Amunugama Suramba, Ukkuwa, Gunaya, Punchi Gura and Sri Jayana. Others include A.H.E Molamure, Pani Bharatha and Ven. Rambukwelle Siddhartha.

Many contemporary dancers in Sri Lanka have borrowed from the Kandyan form for their work.
