= Ernest MacIntyre =

Sri Lankan writer (1934–2025)

- Born: Ernest Thalayasingam MacIntyre; 26 September 1934; Sri Lanka
- Died: 17 December 2025 (aged 91); Sydney, New South Wales, Australia
- Education: Peradeniya University
- Alma mater: Aquinas University College (as director)

Ernest Thalayasingam MacIntyre, (a.k.a. Macintyre, Ernest Thalayasingam), (26 September 1934 – 17 December 2025) was a Sri Lankan playwright of the English language, who was active in the Sri Lankan English theatre for 50 years.

== Early years ==
MacIntyre was born in Sri Lanka on 26 September 1934. He died in Sydney, Australia on 17 December 2025.

== Career ==
MacIntyre attended Peradeniya University where he was a Dramsoc member. During the 1960s, MacIntyre was hailed as the most prolific and successful of Sri Lankan playwrights in English. He was a member of the performing group 'Stage and Set', which presented established international plays as well as those written by him.

MacIntyre is known for his absurd style, although Rasanayagam's Last Riot is written in a realistic mode. His plays were usually performed at the Lionel Wendt theatre in Colombo. During this time there was cross-pollination between the English and Sinhala theatres, primarily due to MacIntyre.

MacIntyre served in the Sri Lankan Air Force from 1961 to 1967, acted as the Director of the drama school at Aquinas University College in 1968 and 1969. From 1969 to 1973, he worked as UNESCO project officer. He migrated to Australia in 1973, worked in the insurance field and received a Master of Arts in Theatre Studies in 1990 from UNSW.

In 2005, MacIntyre revived E.F.C. Ludowyk's He Comes from Jaffna in a production in Sydney, Australia, updating the script to reflect changes in social values. His version of this play, together with the scripts of Rasanayagam's Last Riot and He Still Comes From Jaffna, was published in the anthology Jaffna and Colombo.

In 2009 Macintyre wrote "Antigone in Sri Lanka as IRANGANI" A tragedy of our times derived from the ancient play of Sophoclese. It was performed in 2010 at the Belconnen Theatre in Canberra and the Riverside Theatre, Sydney. It was translated into Tamil in 2011. Perhaps his most seminal work is Rasanayagam's last riot, about Sri Lanka's ethnic conflict, which was translated into Singhalese in 2025. His last full production was The Lost Culavamsa in 2017. He has written several plays including A Statue for Manimakelai (2022), performed in Sri Lanka in 2025, and Kannate (2024).

In 2009 a PhD thesis on "Diasporic Longing and the Changing Contours of Resistance in The Plays of Ernest Thalayasingham Macintyre" was successfully submitted to The University of Madras by T. Sumathy Thangapandian, now a member of Loksaba, and her PhD thesis is now published as a book, with a foreword by MacIntyre.

== Emigration ==
MacIntyre's emigration in 1973 brought a lull in creativity in the English theatre in Sri Lanka. He founded theatre group Sydney Kolam Maduwa and has continued to write, produce and direct plays in Australia.https://www.sundaytimes.lk/160306/plus/our-differences-are-all-cultural-not-biological-185210.html His play Let's Give Them Curry was published by Heinemann and on the curriculum for the Victorian VCE in the 1980s. He wrote many plays in Australia, and one of his last works was A Bend in The Mahaweli, written about the love story between him and his wife. In 2025 The Nautanki theatre group established the Ernest Thalayasingham MacIntyre award recognising an individual of South Asian heritage for their outstanding contribution to theatre and the arts in Australia.

== Works ==
- 1967: The Full Circle of Caucasian Chalk
- ?: The President of the Old Boys' Club
- 1973: A somewhat mad and grotesque comedy
- 2000: He Still Comes From Jaffna
- 1981: Let's Give Them Curry, An Australian-Asian Comedy in 3 Acts
- 1971: The Education of Miss Asia
- 1990: Rasanayagam's Last Riot
- 1991: The Loneliness of the Short-Distance Traveller
- 2002: The theatre of migration
- 2003: The UN Inspector is a Sri Lankan
- 2009: Irangani
- 1990: The government of Beddagama
- 2004: How Gods and Demons play together
- 2017: The lost culavamsa
- 2022: A statue for Manimekalai
- 2024: A bend in the Mahaweli
