= George Keyt =

Sri Lankan painter (1901-1993)

George Percival Sproule Keyt, MBE (17 April 1901 – 31 July 1993) was a Sri Lankan painter. He is often considered Sri Lanka's most distinguished modern painter. Keyt's dominant style is influenced by cubism. He also claimed to be influenced by his contemporary Henri Matisse and the ancient Buddhist art and sculpture of Nagarjunakonda, Sanchi and Gandhara. The Jataka tales formed a recurring theme in many of his works.

In addition to being a painter, Keyt was a poet. He outlined his perceptions and practice as a painter in a few essays on the vision of the painter. One of his most notable literary works is his translation of the Gita Govinda into English (Bombay, 1940) and Sinhalese. These translations were illustrated by his own line drawings (see Martin Russell collection and Amerasinghe-Ganendra collections).

== Early life ==
Keyt was born in Ceylon, the son of Henry Kriekenbeek Keyt and Constance Evelyn née Sproule. He was educated at Trinity College (Kandy), an elite colonial school in the British public school tradition. Stemming from Anglo-Dutch Burgher origins, Keyt gave much time from an early age to drawing and the study of art and developed a consuming passion for books and reading.

== Influence ==
The spell of the ancient hill capital and its Buddhist aura soon came to exercise a powerful and lasting influence and was to provide both the literary and artistic stimulus living so close to the Malwatte Vihare. He became greatly drawn towards Buddhism and championed the cause of the Buddhist revival. He wrote profusely in both prose and verse. The young painter also began to turn his back on the values of the westernised milieu of the class into which he was born.

His explorations in Hindu mythology and Indian literature led him to close links with the cultural life of India, where he lived for long and short periods from 1939 right up to the late seventies. To the Sri Lankan Buddhist source were now added the imagery of Hindu myth and legend as key influences.

A meeting with Rabindranath Tagore in the 1930s in Ceylon left a lasting impression.

== 43 Group ==
In 1930 at the Ferguson Hall, Union Place, the photographer Lionel Wendt organised Keyt and fellow artist Geoffrey Beling's first exhibition. Critics considered the art ‘manifestly ridiculous and degrading’, however Pablo Neruda, the Chilean poet, wrote in the Times of Ceylon that "true artists are rare in Ceylon. There are two exceptions". The exhibition also included works by Charles Freegrove Winzer, to whom Keyt and Beling were pupils.

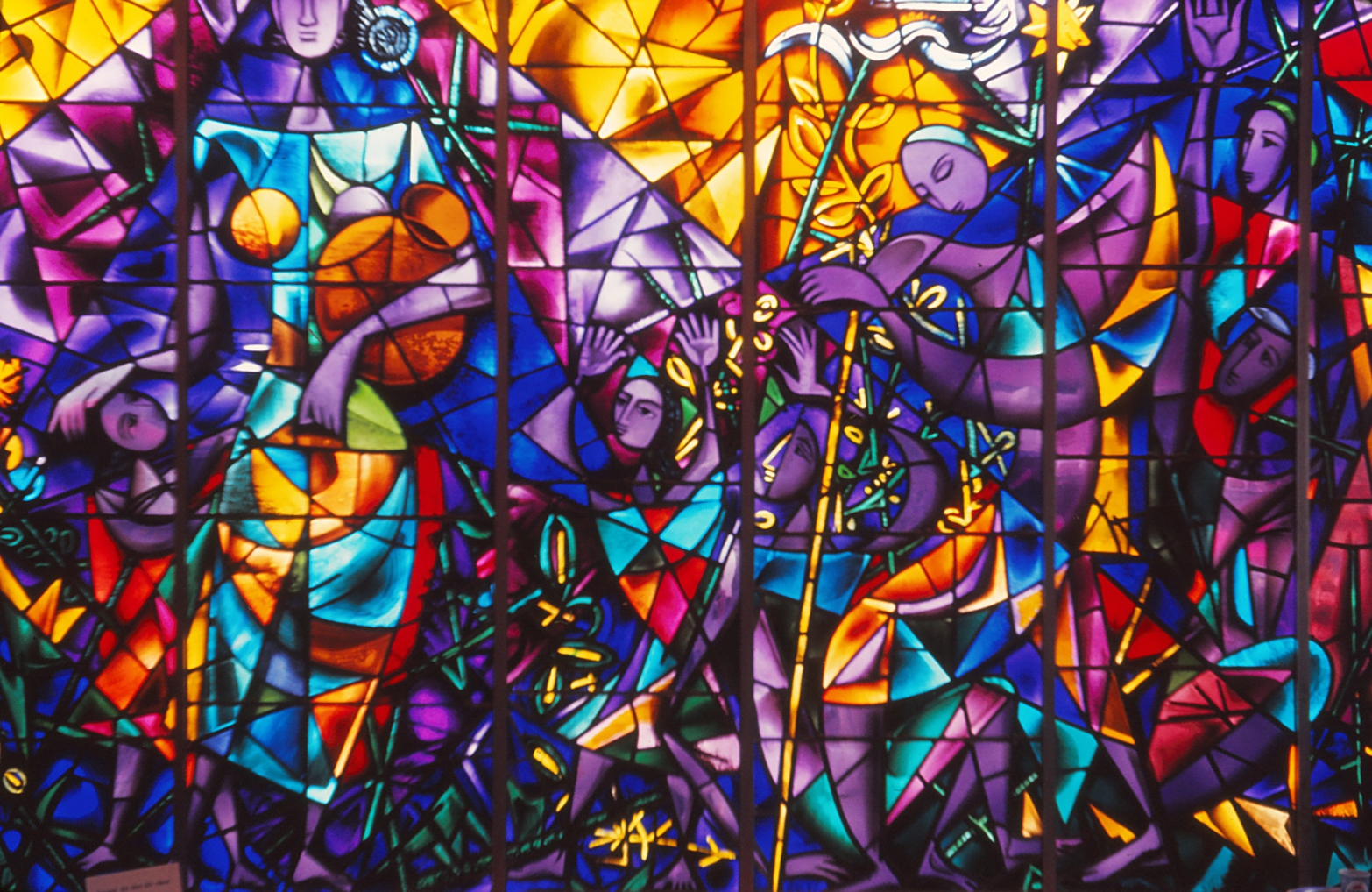
George Keyt − Window of Sri Lankan Pavillon at Expo 67 in Montreal, Quebec, Canada

Keyt was a founder member of the Colombo '43 Group of Sri Lankan artists, and one of its four leading painters, along with Ivan Peries, Justin Daraniyagala and Harry Pieris. Keyt, Pieris and Lionel Wendt are also known for their efforts to popularise Kandyan dance and other Sri Lankan dance forms. Harold Peiris was his brother-in-law.

Many exhibitions of his work have also been held in India, London and other European and American centres. His pictures are found in various museums and galleries abroad, as well as in private collections in Sri Lanka and throughout the world.

== Honours ==
Sri Lanka has issued several stamps featuring the paintings of George Keyt. He was appointed a Member of the Order of the British Empire (MBE) in the 1953 New Year Honours.
