= George Claessen =

Sri Lankan artist and poet (1909-1999)

- Born: 5 May 1909; Colombo, Sri Lanka
- Died: 1 May 1999 (aged 89)
- Known for: Painting

George Claessen (5 May 1909 – 1 May 1999) was a Sri Lankan artist and poet whose art was characterised by his mystical outlook and beliefs. He was a founding member of the Colombo '43 Group.

== Biography ==
Claessen was born in Colombo and was a largely self-taught artist who began to paint professionally when, aged 29, he joined the Colombo Port Commission as a draughtsman. In 1943 Claessen was among the founding members of the Colombo '43 Group, who embraced modern European artistic forms over traditional Sri Lankan forms. During World War II the War Artists' Advisory Committee acquired a work by Claessen under a scheme for artworks by colonial artists. Claessen's painting was displayed at the National Gallery in London during 1945.

In 1947 Claessen had a solo show at the Velasquez Gallery in Melbourne by which point he was painting in a purely abstract manner. Other solo shows, at the Archer Gallery in 1949 and in 1962 at the New Vision Centre in 1962, followed. Claessen exhibited at the Venice Biennale in 1956 and at the 1959 Sao Paulo Biennale in 1959 where he won an award. Claessen exhibited in London several times and was a member of the Hampstead Artists Council and the Islington Art Circle. He also exhibited with the Royal Society of British Artists and the Society of Graphic Art.

Throughout his life Claessen continued to work at the Colombo Port Commission until his retirement and also published several volumes of poetry. A memorial exhibition was held in 2000.

== Published works ==
- Poems of a Painter (1967)
- Poems about Nothing (1981)
- Collected Poems (1995)
