= Henry Lorensz Wendt =

Justice Henry Lorensz Wendt (28 October 1858 - 20 November 1911) was Ceylonese lawyer, judge and legislator. He was a Puisne Justice of the Supreme Court of Ceylon and a member of the Legislative Council of Ceylon.

Born to George Arnold Wendt, an accountant and Mary Louise Georgiana Anderson, he was educated S. Thomas' College where he won the Gregory Scholarship. Having matriculated to the University of Calcutta, he passed his finals in Art in 1876. In 1879 he became an advocate and later became a barrister from the Gray's Inn.

Having started his legal practice in the unofficial bar in Supreme Court and District Courts of Colombo. He acted as Solicitor General of Ceylon in 1897. From 1895 to 1900, he served as the appointed unofficial member of the Legislative Council representing the Burger community. He acted as Attorney General of Ceylon in 1900 and 1901. In August 1901, he was appointed as acting Puisne Judge of the Supreme Court and was confirmed in October. He would later become the Senior Puisne Justice serving until his retirement in November 1910.

In 1899, he married Amelia De Saram, daughter of John Henricus de Saram, CMG, District Judge of Kandy. They had two sons, Lionel George Henricus Wendt, a photographer and Henry Lorenz Wendt. A keen amateur photographer, he formed the Amateur Photographic Society of Ceylon.
