= Charmaine Solomon =

Australian cookery writer (born 1930)

Charmaine Solomon OAM
- Born: Charmaine Maureen Poulier; 1930 (age 95–96); Colombo, Ceylon
- Citizenship: Australian
- Occupations: Author, Business Owner
- Writing career
- Language: English
- Years active: 1972–present
- Genre: Cookbooks
- Notable work: The Complete Asian Cookbook
- Notable awards: OAM

Charmaine Maureen Solomon OAM (born 1930) is an Australian cook, author of 31 cookbooks and the creator of her own brand of spice blends and marinades. The Sydney Morning Herald and much of the public has called her "the Queen of Asian cooking in Australia" and part of "the holy trinity of cookbook authors". She is named in Who's Who in Australia and credited by various commentators with introducing Asian food to Australian households. Her 1976 book, The Complete Asian Cookbook, has sold over one million copies in five languages and is regarded as one of Australia's most influential cookbooks.

== Background ==
Solomon was born Charmaine Maureen Poulier in Colombo, Ceylon (now Sri Lanka), to Burgher parents. Her mother was originally from Burma. At 18 she became the assistant to the editor of the women's pages of the Ceylon Daily News, an English language morning paper. She interviewed royalty, film stars, movie directors, authors and covered social events. In 1956 she married Rangoon-born musician Reuben Kelly Solomon and they had two daughters before moving to Australia in 1959, where they later had two sons.

== Career ==
Solomon taught herself to cook in part to calm her fears of being in an unfamiliar place while Reuben worked nights as a musician. In 1964 she came second in the Woman's Day Butter White Wings Bake Off and attracted the attention of cookbook author Margaret Fulton, who invited her to join Woman's Day as a food writer. She worked at the magazine for 11 years, including three as food editor, then became the cookery editor of Belle magazine. She was a regular columnist for The Sun-Herald and The Sydney Morning Herald and was the food editor of Family Circle magazine for three years. Her first book, the South East Asian Cookbook, was published in 1972 and The Complete Asian Cookbook followed in 1976. Over the next three decades she wrote 29 more books.

== Honours and awards ==
Solomon was awarded the Medal of the Order of Australia in 2007 for service to food media, particularly as the author of Asian cookery books. Her Encyclopaedia of Asian Food won a silver medal in the 1996 Julia Child Cookbook Awards and a silver ladle in the 1997 World Food Media Best Food Book awards. The line of spice pastes and marinades she developed with husband Reuben won a Jaguar Award for Excellence in 1998 and she won Best Vegetarian Book in English for The Complete Vegetarian Cookbook in the 2002 Gourmand World Cookbook Awards.
