= Vernon Jonklaas =

Ceylonese politician

Vernon Jonklaas, QC (10 June 1906 – 19??) was a Ceylonese lawyer and politician. He served as an appointed member of the House of Representatives.

Born in Kandy, Jonklaas qualified as a Proctor and Notary Public from the Ceylon Law College and started his practice in Kandy. He later became an Advocate having completed the advocates course at the Ceylon Law College. He was later appointed a Queen's Counsel. He married May Theresa Clementi-Smith on 3 June 1929, they had one daughter.

He was appointed to the House of Representatives by the Governor-General in 1960 and again in 1965, serving until 1970.
