= '43 Group (art collective) =

20th-century modern art school in Sri Lanka

- Years active: 29 August 1943–1964
- Location: Sri Lanka
- Major figures: Lionel Wendt, Geoffrey Beling, George Claessen, Aubrey Collette, Justin Daraniyagala, Richard Gabriel, George Keyt, Ivan Peries, Harry Pieris, L. T. P. Manjusri Thero and others.
- Influences: Sri Lankan art, European art, Charles Freegrove Winzer
- Influenced: Progressive Artists' Group (PAG)

The '43 Group was a 20th-century modern art school established in August 1943 in Colombo, Sri Lanka (then British Ceylon).

The group was essentially an association of like-minded artists who had broken away from the Ceylon Society of Arts, led by photographer and critic Lionel Wendt, and originally included nine painters as key members (listed alphabetically): Geoffrey Beling, George Claessen, Aubrey Collette, Justin Daraniyagala, Richard Gabriel, George Keyt, Ivan Peries, Harry Pieris (the first and only Secretary of the Group), and the Ver. Manjusri Thero.

The group were influenced by Charles Freegrove Winzer, to whom Keyt and Beling had been pupils.

The paintings of the group constituted a historic break in Sri Lankan and, more generally, South Asian tradition. Art historian Jagath Weerasinghe wrote that the most significant achievement of the 43 Group was their localization of European modernist trends into a distinctively Sri Lankan modernist art.

Lester James Peries became a later associate of the group.

The Group also promoted Kandyan dance and other Sri Lankan dance forms.
