= Lionel Wendt =

Sri Lankan pianist, artist, photographer, filmmaker and critic (1900–1944)

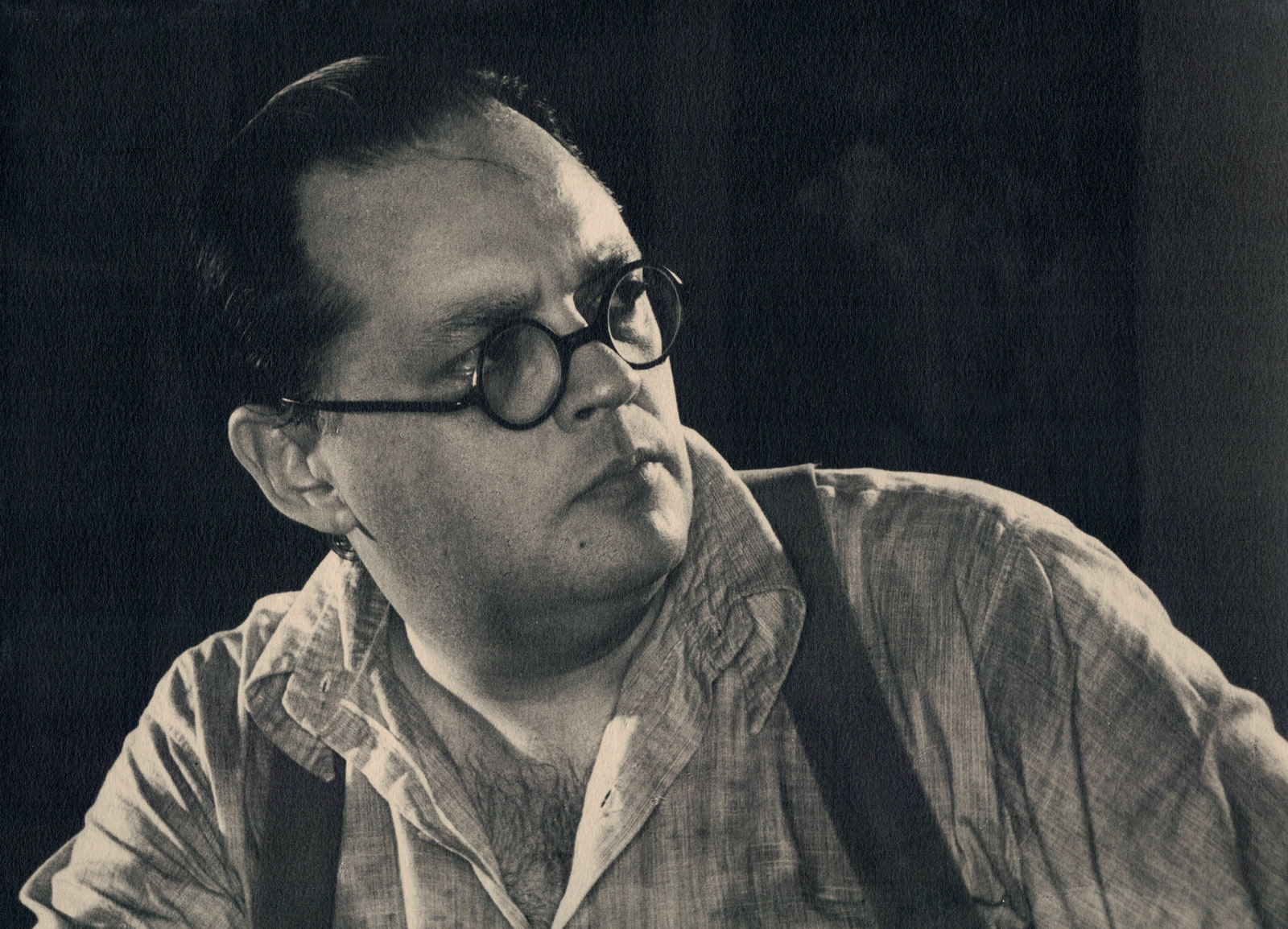
- Born: 3 December 1900; Ceylon
- Died: 19 December 1944 (aged 44)
- Education: S. Thomas' College, Mount Lavinia, Inner Temple, Royal Academy of Music
- Occupations: Musician, photographer, literature collector, critic, and cinematographer.

Lionel George Henricus Wendt (3 December 1900 – 19 December 1944) was a pianist, photographer, filmmaker and critic from Sri Lanka. He was the leader of '43 Group, a collective of Sri Lankan artists.

The Lionel Wendt Art Centre is a major art centre and theatre in Colombo, Sri Lanka, dedicated to his memory.

== Early life ==
His father, Henry Lorenz Wendt, came from the Burgher community, composed of mixed descendants of European settlers. A Supreme Court Justice and Legislative Counsel, he was also one of the founders of the Amateur Photographic Society of Ceylon (1906). His mother, Amelia de Saram, was Sinhalese. Daughter of a district judge, she was an active social worker, organizing numerous concerts for charity. Lionel's father died when he was less than eleven years old, and his mother less than seven years later.

Despite his remarkable musical talents, family traditions and customs at the time prevented Wendt from pursuing a purely musical career. Lionel Wendt was educated at S. Thomas' College before traveling to London in 1919 to study law at the Inner Temple. The English capital offered him the opportunity to pursue advanced training as a pianist at the Royal Academy of Music under the direction of Oscar Beringer. These years in Europe were an opportunity for him to discover the artistic currents of the time, including surrealism and cubism.

Returning to his native island in 1924, Wendt did not practise law much, although he was registered as a lawyer at the Supreme Court of Ceylon. He soon gave public piano recitals, both as a soloist and as an accompanist. He gave up the law for music in 1928 and developed an interest in avant-garde music.

Lionel Wendt became the figurehead of the only circle of avant-garde artists of the time, which included his childhood friend, the painter George Keyt. In his autobiography, the poet Pablo Neruda, Chilean consul in Colombo in 1928–1929, writes: "I found out that the pianist, photographer, critic, and cinematographer Lionel Wendt was the central figure of a cultural life torn between the death rattles of the Empire and a human appraisal of the untapped values of Ceylon."

Lionel Wendt and his friends tried to contribute to the formation of a modern national consciousness. They felt deeply that the future of their country could not be built by ignoring an ancient heritage or by rejecting the Western way of life, but rather by merging the two.

== The Photograph ==
In the early 1930s, while continuing to give piano recitals, Lionel Wendt turned to what became his great passion, photography.

In 1934, jointly with Bernard G. Thornley and P.J.C. Durrant, Wendt revived the Amateur Photographic Society of Ceylon, founded by his father and which was then renamed the Photographic Society of Ceylon. He took part in many exhibitions in Ceylon between 1935 and 1944. His first solo exhibition took place in 1938 at the Camera Club in London, at the invitation of Ernst Leitz, the inventor and manufacturer of the Leica.

While the male body is his favourite theme, he also deals with landscapes, everyday life, architecture, archaeology. He reconciles knowledge and interest in modern artistic trends (Magritte, Man Ray, Chirico...) with a desire to represent traditional Ceylonese life. He uses a multiple techniques such as photomontage, photo-collage, solarization, and photograms.

== Song of Ceylon ==
In 1934, the British director Basil Wright associated Wendt with the development of his documentary Song of Ceylon. Described by Wright as one of the six best photographers in the world, Wendt was not only the narrator of the film; his eye as a photographer and his in-depth knowledge of the country and its culture were an essential contribution to what was considered a major documentary. In an interview published in 1949 in Mosquito (the magazine for Ceylonese students in England), Basil Wright paid tribute to Lionel Wendt:

Without him [L. Wendt], I don't think Song of Ceylon could have been what it is. For here was a man who knew Ceylon as few men did, and he was in touch with the avant-garde cinema of those days and he knew what the documentary people were doing. As a matter of fact, the only two people I met in Ceylon who knew anything about films then were Wendt and George Keyt.

The collaboration between Wendt and Wright continued after the shooting of Song of Ceylon, with the photographer staying in London several times to become Wright's assistant in the company he had founded. Wendt was the first Ceylonese to establish a relationship between photography and film when the latter developed on the island during the 1930s.

== Patron of the arts ==
Lionel Wendt, Harry Pieris and George Keyt played a leading role in the promotion of Kandyan dance. They act as patrons of dancers and drummers from the Kandy area: Suramba and his brother Jayana from Anumugama village, Ukkawa and his brother Gunaya from Nittawela. These artists will be among the most talented and well-known representatives of Kandyan dance.

Lionel Wendt is a dedicated patron of a group of painters. He buys their works, organizes exhibitions, and publicly defends these painters in the newspapers.

On 29 August 1943, The '43 Group was founded in Colombo, with Lionel Wendt as leader. The inaugural meeting of the group is held at his home. The aim was to bring together independent artists such as George Keyt, Ivan Peries, Harry Pieris and Justin Daraniyagala, now recognised as among the best representatives in Asia of the modernism of the mid-20th century.

== Death ==
Lionel Wendt died of a heart attack in Colombo on 19 December 1944. The Lionel Wendt Art Centre was established on the site of his home, 18 Guilford Crescent.

As was common in the profession, Wendt's negatives were destroyed by a fellow photographer. A small number of his prints, however, survived him.
