= National Art Gallery, Sri Lanka =

National Art Gallery
- ජාතික කලාභවන
- Location in greater Colombo
- Former names: Ceylon Art Gallery
- Address: 106 Ananda Coomaraswamy Mawatha, Cinnamon Gardens, Colombo 7
- Location: Colombo, Sri Lanka
- Coordinates: 6°54′41.247″N 79°51′36.633″E
- Owner: Department of Cultural Affairs
- Type: Art Gallery
- Event: Art

Construction
- Opened: March 1932
- Architect: A. C. G. S. Amarasekara

The National Art Gallery in Colombo, Sri Lanka was the first state-sponsored art gallery built in the country.

The gallery is located in Cinnamon Gardens near the Nelum Pokuna Mahinda Rajapaksa Theatre, Viharamahadevi Park, the National Museum of Colombo, the Town Hall, Colombo and Colombo Public Library.

The building consists of a three wing gallery space: the main gallery has a permanent collection of portraits and landscapes and the two adjoining wings display temporary exhibitions by Sri Lankan artists. The eastern hall is approximately 32.9 m × 9.8 m (108 ft × 32 ft) and the western hall is approximately about 20.7 m × 9.4 m (68 ft × 31 ft). Both galleries have a 5.5 m (18 ft) ceiling height.

In 1911 the need for a national art gallery was first identified by the Ceylon Society of Arts and the Arts Council of Ceylon however its construction was delayed until after World War 1. The central gallery was completed and opened in March 1932. The building was designed by Gate Mudliyar A. C. G. S. Amarasekara. In 1952 the gallery was placed under the control of the Department of Cultural Affairs. In June 2013, the gallery's collection was reported to be in a very poor state of repair.

In 2026, Hiniduma Sunil Senevi, Minister of Buddha Sasana, Religious and Cultural Affairs, revealed that 42 ancient paintings had gone missing from the gallery, which had been closed for renovations since 2012.
