= Scarlet woman =

Scarlet woman may refer to:

- A female prostitute
- The Whore of Babylon, a symbolic female figure in the Book of Revelation
- Babalon, a goddess in the occult system of Thelema

== Film ==
- The Scarlet Woman, a 1916 American drama film
- The Scarlet Woman (1924 film), a British comedy film

== Literature ==
- A Scarlet Woman, a 1986 novel by Margaret Pargeter
- Scarlet Woman, a 1995 novel by Barbara Faith

== Other media ==
- "Scarlet Woman", a song by Weather Report from the 1974 album Mysterious Traveller

== See also ==
- The Red Woman, a 1917 American silent Western film
