= Harry Pieris =

Sri Lankan painter

- Born: 10 August 1904; Ceylon
- Died: 14 March 1988 (aged 83); Sri Lanka
- Known for: Painting, drawing
- Movement: Colombo '43 Group

Harry Pieris (10 August 1904 – 14 March 1988) was a Sri Lankan painter. He was one of the founders of the Colombo '43 Group, and has been considered the finest Asian portraitist of the 20th century working in a European style.

Charles Henry ("Harry") Alfred Pieris was born on 10 August 1904 to a wealthy landed family. He was the eighth of eleven children of Henry ("Harry") Pieris and Lydia de Mel, one of the 9 daughters of Jacob De Mel. Sir James Peiris and Sir Henry de Mel were among his uncles, and his numerous cousins included Harold Peiris, Lakdasa De Mel and Devar Surya Sena.

Pieris received his early art education at the Atelier School of Art under the tutelage of Mudaliyar A. C. G. S. Amarasekara. He studied Pali and Sanskrit at the University of Oxford and went on to study art at the Royal College of Art under Sir William Rothenstein. He won the prize for the best portrait in 1926, the portrait of his uncle, Sir James Pieris.

Pieris returned to Ceylon in 1927, having gained a diploma from the Royal College of Art. He then went to Paris in 1929, spending six years under the tutelage of Robert Falk. He developed a close friendship with Henri Matisse and worked at the Académie de la Grande Chaumière. He returned to Ceylon in 1935 after a teaching stint at the Rabindranath Tagore's Abode of Peace in Santiniketan, and took over the management of his family landholdings as well as working as a portraitist.

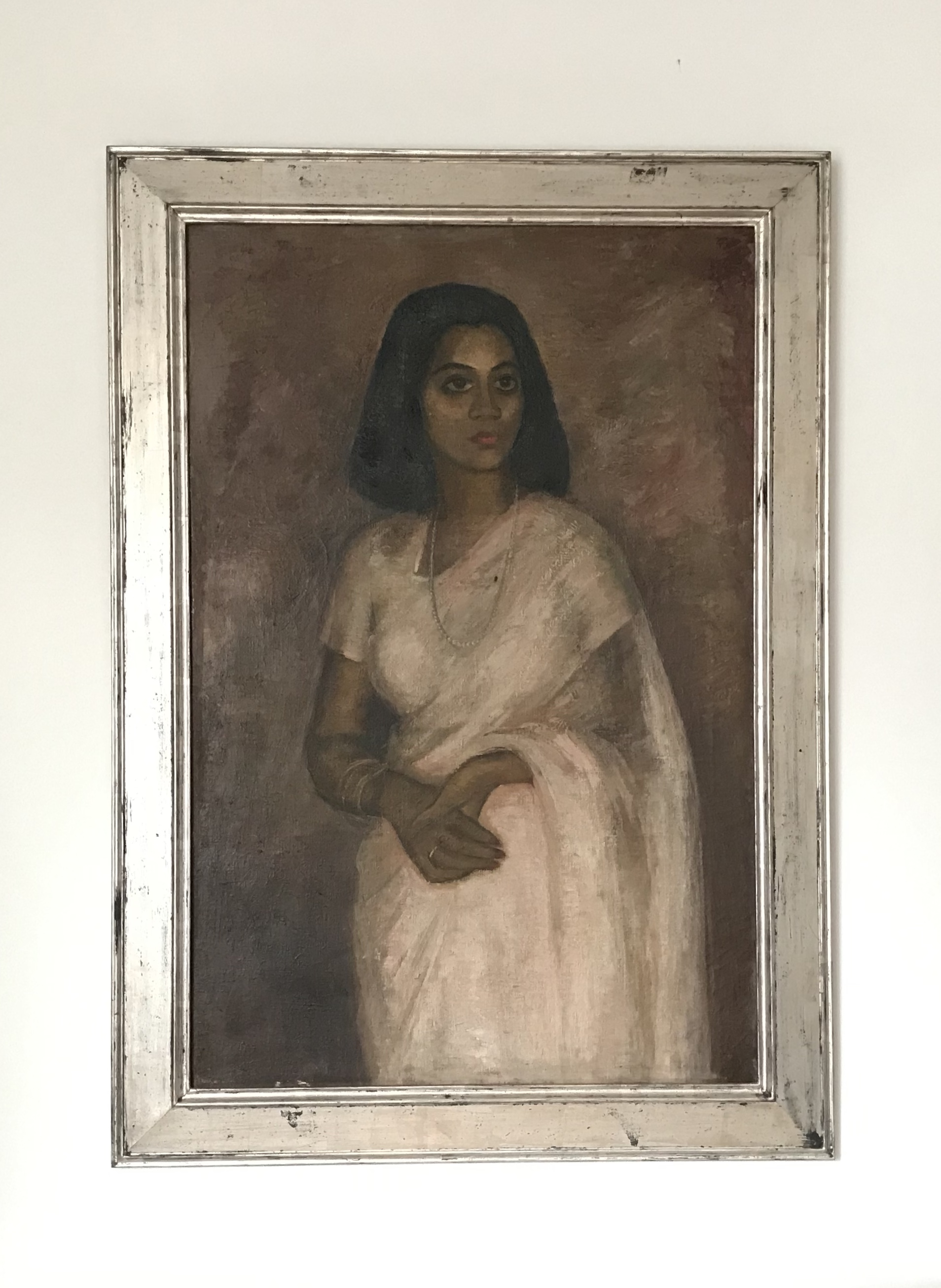
Miss Lalani Canekeratne, portrait 1949

He was a strong influence in the Colombo '43 Group, serving as its secretary. Ivan Peries was a pupil of his. He founded the Sapumal Foundation to which he bequeathed his home and art collection.
