= John de Silva =

Sri Lankan playwright

John de Silva (13 January 1857 – 28 January 1922) was a Sri Lankan playwright.

== Life and career ==
=== Early life ===
De Silva was born on 13 January 1857 in Kotte. He worked as a teacher and a lawyer before entering theater. His first drama Parabhava Natakaya was a satire on the upper class.

=== Playwright ===
De Silva was influenced by the work of C. Don Bastian (1852-1921), the creator of the ‘Nurthi’, who was also the editor of the first daily Sinhala news paper. De Silva wrote and produced several historical and religious plays drawing from nurti and nadagam traditions. These include Siri Sangabo (1903), Sri Vickrama Rajasingha (1906), Devanampiya Tissa (1914), Vihara Maha Devi (1916) and Dutugemunu. He also scripted Ramayana, Sakuntala, Vessanatara, Uttara Ramacharitaya, Ratnavali and Nagananda.

De Silva staged his early plays at the Public Hall (later the site of Empire Cinema) with the Sinhala Arya Subodha Natya society. He later formed the Vijaya Ranga society and staged his plays at the Gintupitiya Theatre. de Silva died on 28 January 1922.

=== Legacy ===
In an acknowledgment of de Silva's contributions, the Sri Lankan government constructed the John de Silva Memorial Theatre at Ananda Cumaraswamy Mawatha in Colombo. A commemorative stamp was also issued on January 31, 1987.
