= Kandyan–Dutch war (1764–1766) =

War in Sri Lanka between the Dutch East India Company and the Kingdom of Kandy

Kandyan-Dutch war (1764-1766)
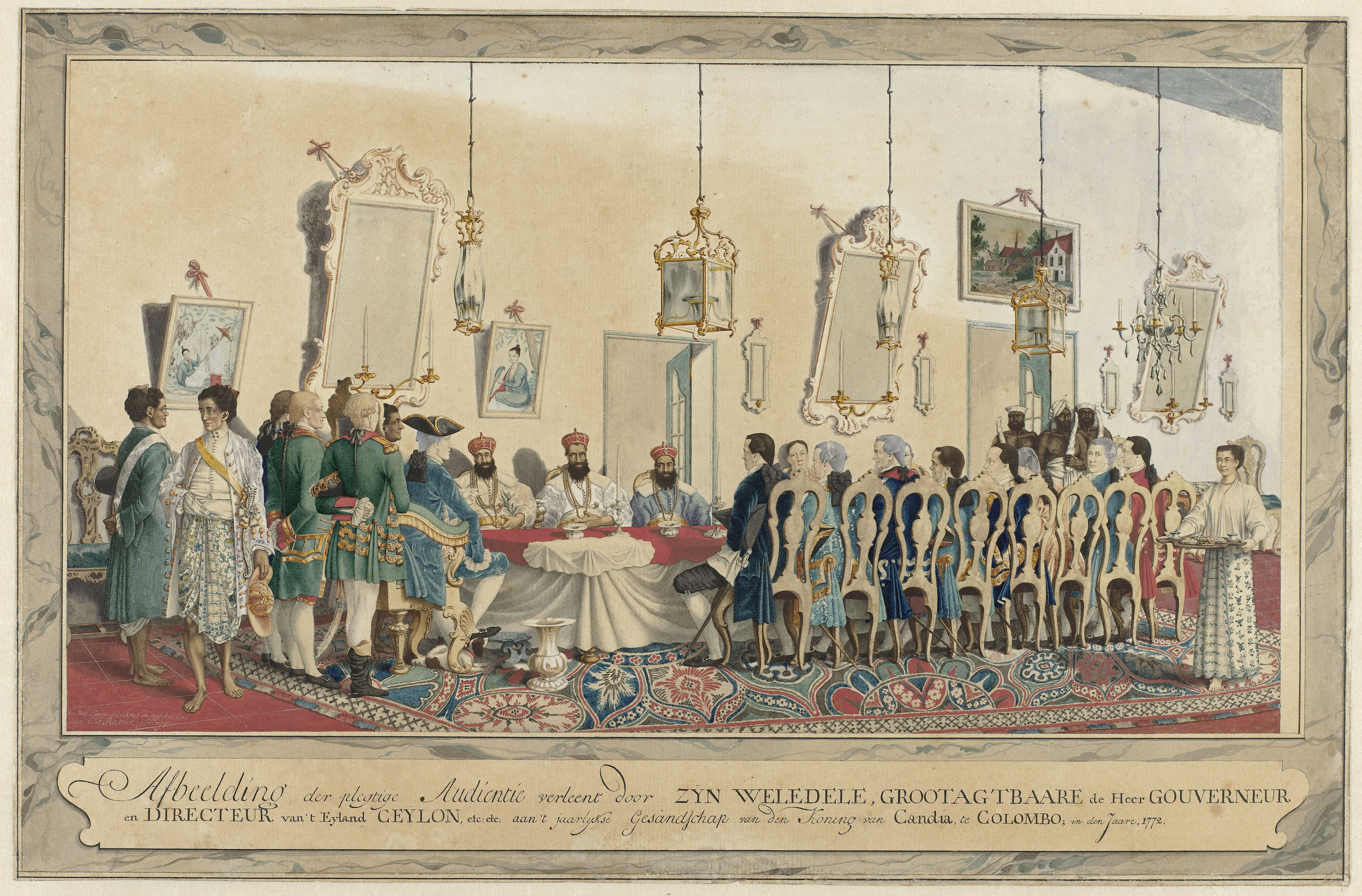
- Reception of the envoys of the king of Kandy by governor Iman Willem Falck
Date	3 February 1764–14 February 1766
Location	Present-day Sri Lanka, and Indian Ocean
Result	Dutch victory: Treaty of Batticaloa
Territorial changes	Dutch occupation of Kandy until Treaty of Batticaloa; All coastal regions ceded to Dutch

Belligerents
Kingdom of Kandy	Dutch Republic: Dutch East India Company

Commanders and leaders
Kirti Sri Rajasinha of Kandy	(Dutch East India Company) Lubbert Jan van Eck (Dutch East India Company) Anthony Mooyart (Dutch East India Company) Iman Willem Falck

Strength
Unknown	1st Expedition: 6 Columns unknown number of men 2nd Expedition: 7,000–8,000 men

The Dutch-Kandy War of 1764-1766 marked a military conflict between the Dutch East India Company and the Kingdom of Kandy, culminating in the occupation of Kandy by Dutch forces and the subsequent transfer of the entire coastal territory of Sri Lanka to Dutch control.

== Background ==
The Dutch administration pursued a territorial expansion strategy that contrasted with the prior Portuguese approach. They considerably enlarged their controlled territory, ultimately gaining control over the remaining harbors and effectively isolating the highland kingdom of Kandy. This isolation rendered Kandy landlocked and prevented its potential alliance with external powers. Through a combination of this strategic encirclement and a prominent display of military might, the authority of the Kandyan kings was subdued. Subsequently, Kandy encountered difficulties in mounting substantial resistance, except in its periodically shifting frontier areas.

Despite an underlying tension between Kandy and the Dutch, open hostilities erupted between the two in 1762 and 1763. During this period, the Dutch captured Chilaw and Puttalam, which were subsequently retaken, and the Kandys where trying to form an alliance with Britain These events prompted the Dutch Council of Indies in Batavia to take decisive action against the Kandyan king. In response to provocations by Kandy that led to riots in lowland regions, the Dutch authorities initiated a punitive expedition.

== First Expedition ==
On February 3, an expedition led by Van Eck departed for Colombo, accompanied by two officers. Subsequently, they joined forces with additional troops and undertook a march towards Kandy. Regrettably, adverse weather conditions and impassable roadways hindered the progress of this venture, leading to the Dutch having to retreat. Subsequent to these events, a confidential meeting took place aimed at bolstering the armed forces. The result was the enlistment of two battalions of sepoys and approximately 1,000 soldiers from various regions, including India, Jaffna, Trincomalee, and Batticaloa. The Dutch East India Company (VOC), aspiring to bring an end to the ongoing conflict, resolved on September 14, 1764, that an invasion would be launched. The army set out from Gonavila, subsequently joined by reinforcements from Puttalam, thereby initiating the planned invasion.

== Dutch invasion, and occupation of Kandy ==
On January 13, 1765, Van Eck, accompanied by Koopman and other officers, embarked on a journey from Colombo to rendezvous with an army stationed at Gonavila. Their route took them through Negombo and Tambaravila. Subsequent intelligence revealed that the Kandyans were bolstering their forces and fortifications, actively preparing for a potential invasion.

Despite numerous challenges including widespread illnesses and frequent skirmishes, the Dutch army managed to persevere and eventually reached Kandy. Their journey led them through various locations, including Katugampola, Etambole, Visnave, Pidaravala, Kurunegala, Teliangona, and Vauda. Their final destination was the heavily fortified Galagedra fortress, which posed significant challenges to overcome. Nevertheless, after a day of concerted efforts, the fortress was successfully captured.

The main army successfully crossed the Hoenay Oya on the morning of February 16. Upon reaching Katugastota along the banks of the Mahaweli River, they encountered another colonel who had already established a camp in the vicinity. Occupying the king's pleasure residence, they proceeded to plunder it. Subsequently, on February 19, they crossed the river. Arriving at the king's palace, they observed the king's absence. This led them to remain there for three days, during which they engaged in looting and plundering.

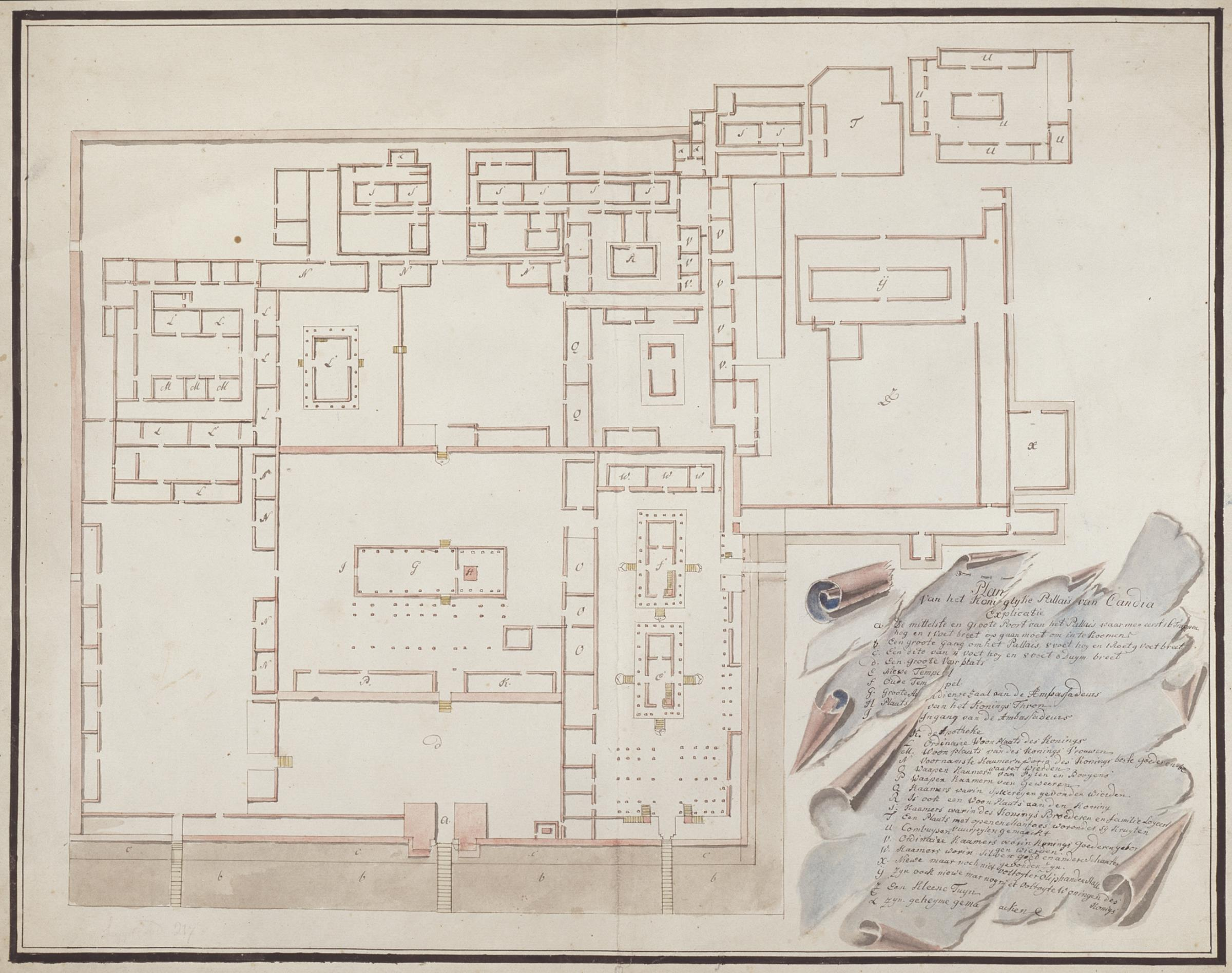
Map of the king's palace

Notably, substantial Kandyan forces emerged, bearing white flags as a sign of submission to the company. This event unfolded on February 22, and Van Eck, in response, conducted promotions for army officers and generals.

The invasion proceeded with notable success, characterized by a lack of setbacks. Swiftly advancing and overcoming every Kandyan army they encountered, they demonstrated remarkable progress. In a parallel effort, another contingent led by Colonel Wesel, numbering 700 men, set out to dismantle the king's alternate palace. Upon receiving information that the king was residing there. Upon reaching the palace, it became evident that the king had fled again, the soldiers plundered and looted it again. As this group returned, they fell victim to an ambush, resulting in the death of 48 soldiers on March 4.

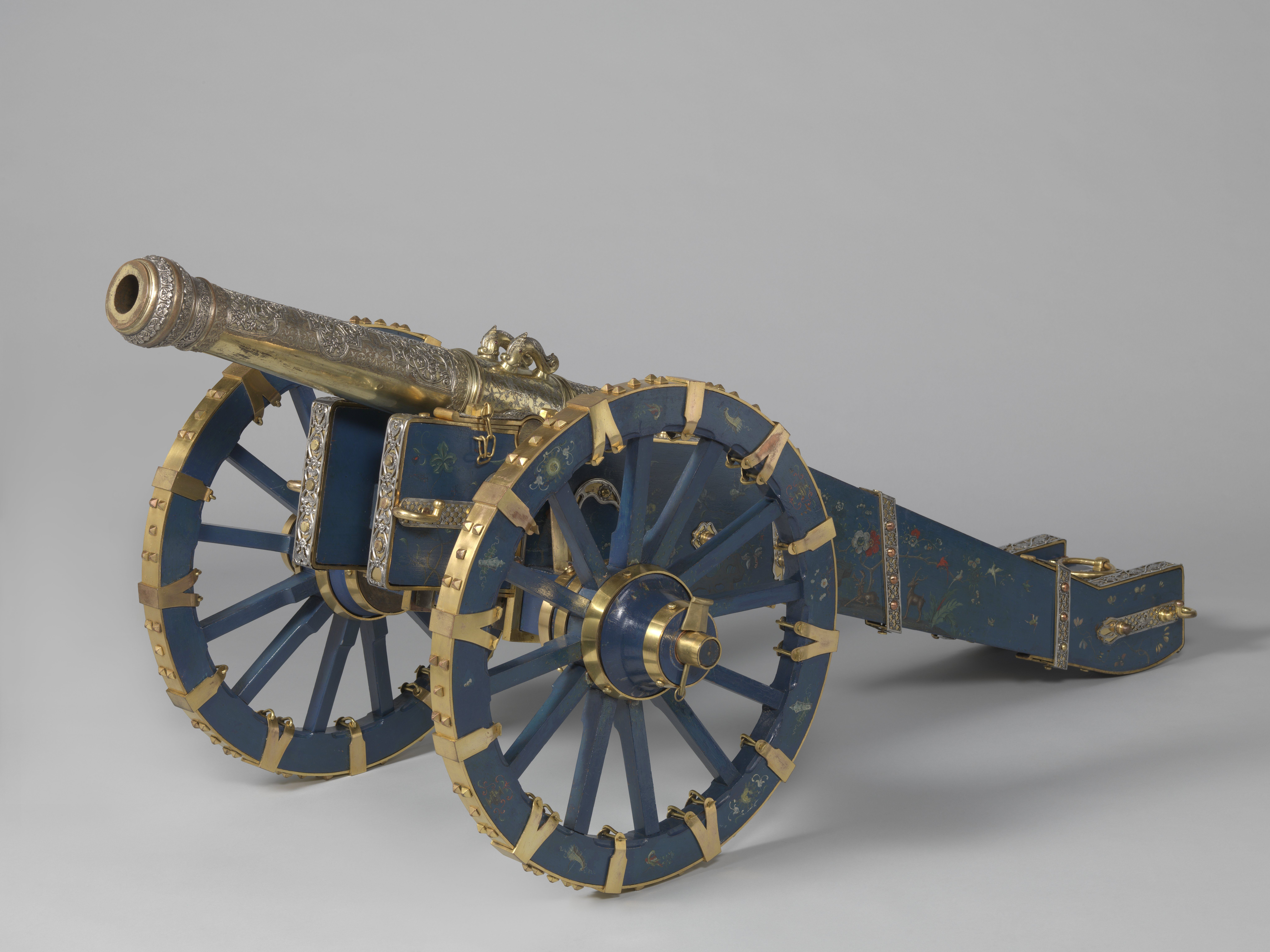
One of the canons captured by the Dutch during the invasion of Kandy

On the same day, Van Eck, along with fellow officers, journeyed back to Colombo. During their absence, Colonel Feber assumed responsibility for overseeing the occupation. Van Eck's return was met with a warm welcome and congratulations for the successful campaign. However, news soon arrived that the Kandyans had adopted guerrilla warfare tactics, launching an attack on a transport and a farm. Colonel Feber, who was in charge of the occupation, sought additional reinforcements in response to sporadic guerrilla warfare activities. Subsequently, following a significant engagement between Dutch forces and Kandyan insurgents on March 24, reinforcements successfully entered occupied Kandy. During a battle while marching to Feber, Major Franken's troops emerged victorious against the Kandyan forces, compelling them to retreat to higher terrain. After a period of illness within the Dutch ranks and subsequent skirmishes with the Kandyan adversaries, diplomatic negotiations eventually led to the establishment of a peace agreement.

== Aftermath ==
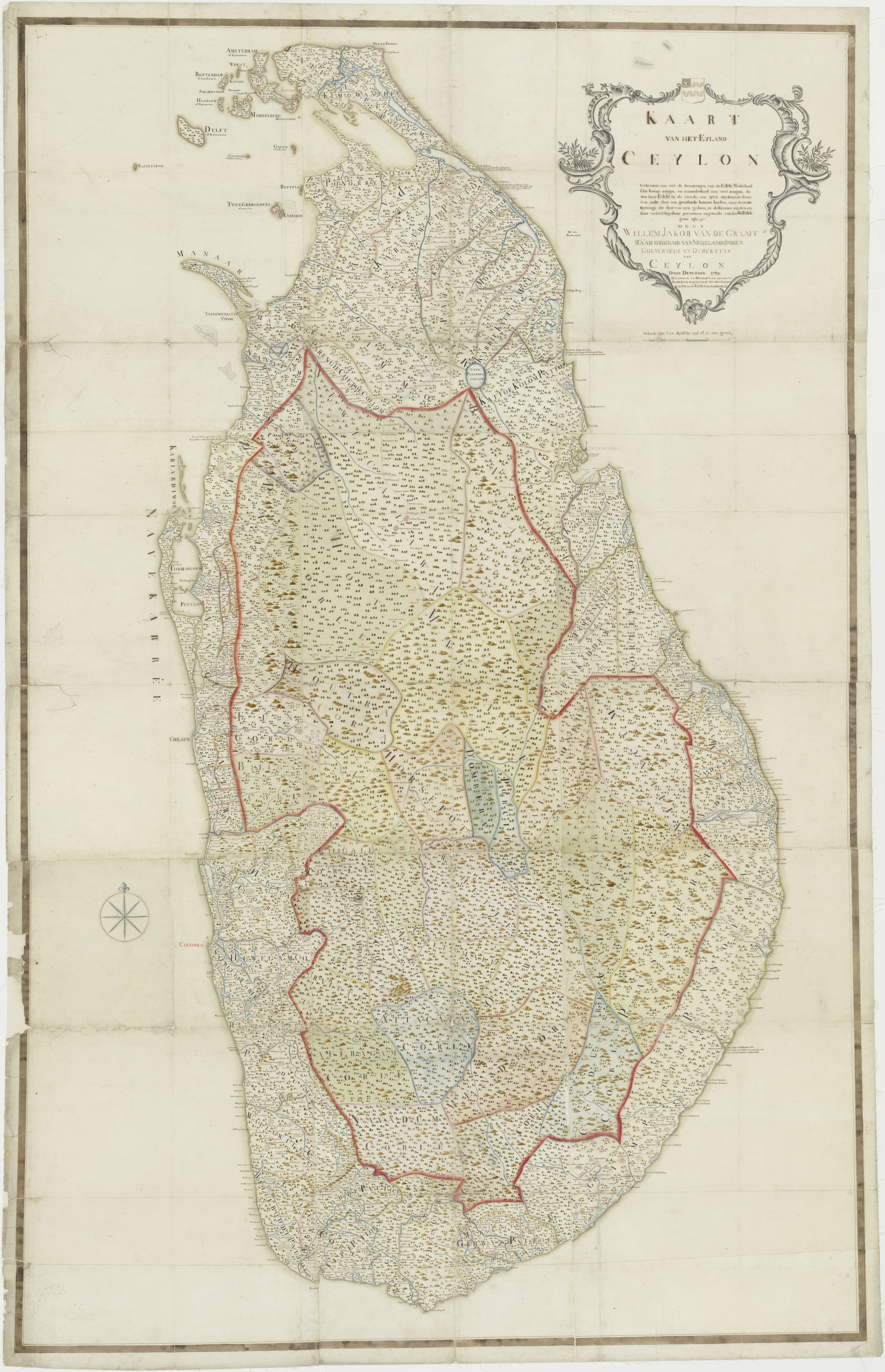
Map of Dutch Ceylon after the Treaty of Batticaloa

After one year of occupation, the Dutch agreed to a treaty with Kandy. However, it was very harsh to the Kandy, forcing them to acknowledge Dutch sovereignty over all the islands, and the entire coastline, so Kandy became landlocked, and thus dependent on the Dutch for imports.
