= Goens =

Goens is a surname. Notable people with the name include:

- Daniel Goens (born 1948), Belgian track cyclist
- Daniël van Goens (1858–1904), French cellist and composer of Dutch descent
- Rijckloff van Goens (1619–1682), Governor-General of the Dutch East Indies
- Rijckloff van Goens Jr., Governor of Dutch Ceylon during its Dutch period
