= Johannes Hertenberg =

19th Governor of Ceylon
- In office 12 January 1724 – 19 October 1725
- Preceded by: Arnold Mold acting governor
- Succeeded by: Joan Paul Schaghen acting governor

Johannes Hertenberg (15 April 1668 in Oudkarspel – 19 October 1725 in Colombo) was the 17th commander of Dutch Malabar from 1716 to 1723 and the 19th Dutch Governor of Ceylon from 1723 until his death.

In 1687, Hertenberg sailed to the Dutch East Indies in the ship De Groote Vischerij as Third Surgeon. He worked his way up to upper-merchant in Makassar by 1712. Between June and September 1712 he was asked to be interim Governor of Makassar, following the death of Gerrit van Toll and until the arrival of his successor Joannes Sipman. He returned to Batavia in August 1714 as upper-merchant. In November of that year he was sent to Ceylon to become commander of Galle. In September 1716 he became commander of Malabar, in which position he generally had a good relationship with the Zamorin of Calicut. He was appointed Governor of Ceylon at the death of Isaak Augustyn Rumpf in June 1723. Jacob de Jong became commander of Malabar and Hertenberg took office in Colombo on 12 January 1724. He seemed to have good relations with the local ruler, the King of Kandy, but died within two years in office on 19 October 1725.

Government offices
Preceded by Arnold Mold acting governor	Governor of Ceylon; 1724–1725	Succeeded by Joan Paul Schaghen acting governor
