= Adriaen Roothaes =

Acting Governor of Dutch Ceylon
- In office 19 Nov 1664 – April 1665
- Preceded by: Jacob Hustaert
- Succeeded by: Rijcklof van Goens

Personal details
- Born: before 1610 Haarlem
- Died: 1672 Ceylon

Adriaen Adriaensz Roothaes (also Adriaan Roothaas) (before 1620 – 1672) was a Dutch captain, Commander of Galle, Ceylon, and acting Governor of Dutch Ceylon from November 1664 to April 1665.

Roothaes was first mentioned at the baptism of his daughter Jesijntje in Hoorn on 1 March 1643. He and his wife, Maertje Pieters, were written down to be from Haarlem. Their second daughter, Guertje, was born in Hoorn in 1646. He became commander and captain of "hired ships" on the Mediterranean Sea and was so successful in 13 different expeditions that the Admiralty of Amsterdam awarded him in 1654 a golden chain and medal. Subsequently he captained the ship Phoenix from Texel to Batavia, Dutch East Indies between 10 December 1654 and 19 June 1655. Presumably, he returned immediately with another fleet, as between 6 January and 19 June 1656 he was captain on the ship Tholen sailing from the Netherlands to Batavia.

In November 1656, he commanded a fleet sailing from Batavia via Ceylon to blockade the Portuguese ports on the coast of Malabar, in particular Goa. In August 1657, he again commanded such an expedition, aboard his old ship the Phoenix. Around 1658 on Ceylon he married as a widower the widow Marija Winninx from Amsterdam. From 1660 to 1672 he was Commander of Galle. He was appointed as acting Governor of Ceylon on 19 November 1664 and until Rijckloff van Goens, who had previously held this office, returned from Batavia in April 1665.

Government offices
Preceded by Jacob Hustaert	Governor of Ceylon (acting); 1664–1665	Succeeded by Rijckloff van Goens
