= Hendrik Becker =

Dutch colonial administrator (1661–1722)

17th Governor of Ceylon
- In office 22 November 1707 – 5 December 1716
- Preceded by: Cornelis Joannes Simonszoon
- Succeeded by: Isaak Augustijn Rumpf

Hendrik Becker (sometimes "Bekker") (3 August 1661, in Amsterdam – ca 15 August 1722, in Amsterdam) was the Governor of Ceylon from 1707 until 1716.

Becker was the son of Johanna Rombouts and Hendirk Becker Sr, schepen of Amsterdam, a director of the Dutch West Indies Company and owner of a whaling fleet. Hendrik Jr joined the Dutch East Indies Company (VOC) and sailed to the East Indies as captain of the ship de Voetboog. He was captain in the army at Japara on Java and from 1692 in Malabar in south-west India. In 1694 he moved to Ceylon, where he had a function in Negapatnam. He became extraordinary member of the Council of the Indies in 1705, and when in 1707 Cornelis Johannes Simonsz had requested a transfer from governor of Ceylon, he solicited for the position. He was appointed on 22 November 1707. During his reign as governor the financial situation of the VOC on Ceylon improved considerably. He was renowned for founding the Leper Hospital in Hendella (now Hendala in the Gampaha District). Still, the fact that the VOC appointed Isaak Augustijn Rumpf, an adversary of Becker, as his successor suggests that the VOC council was not entirely pleased with his tenure. He retired in December 1716. and in 1717 returned to his fatherland as commander of a fleet of 29 ships carrying cargo worth seven million guilders.

Becker was married with Anna Catharina Collaert, but remained without offspring. He died in his hometown and was buried on 17 August 1722 in the Westerkerk.

Government offices
Preceded by Cornelis Joannes Simonszoon	Governor of Ceylon; 1707–1716	Succeeded by Isaak Augustijn Rumpf
