= Joan Gideon Loten =

Dutch servant

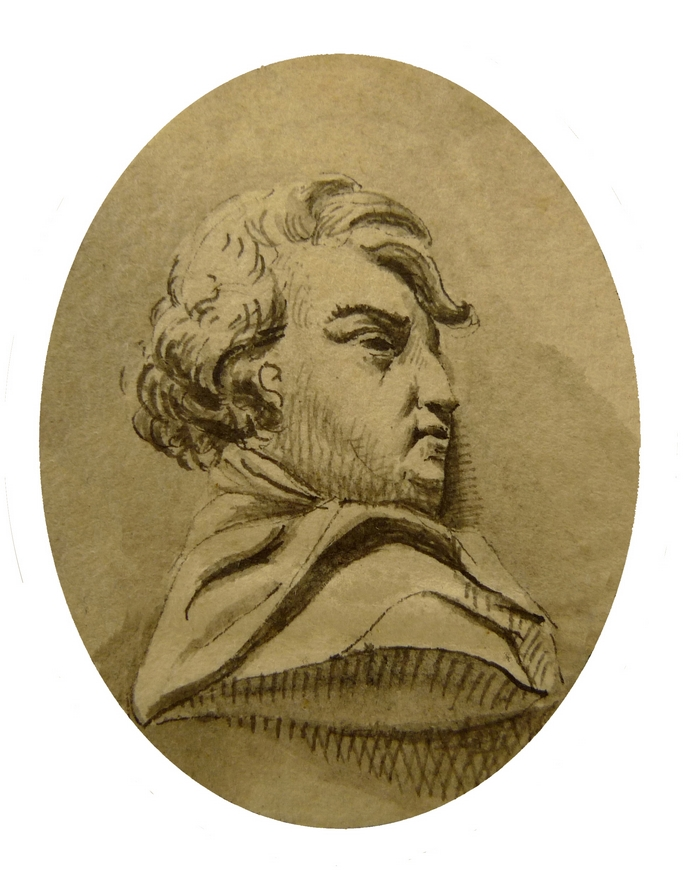

29th Governor of Zeylan
- In office 10 September 1752 – 17 March 1757
- Preceded by: Jacob de Jong as acting governor
- Succeeded by: Jan Schreuder

Personal details
- Born: 16 May 1710
- Died: 25 February 1789 (aged 78)

Joan Gideon Loten (also spelt Johan or John, in school records as Johannes Gideon Looten; 16 May 1710 – 25 February 1789) was a Dutch servant in the colonies of the Dutch East India Company, the 29th Governor of Zeylan, Fellow of the Royal Society (elected 1760) and Fellow of the Society of Antiquaries of London (elected 1761). During his time in the colonies he made collections of natural history. In 1758 he moved to Holland. Nine months after his return from the Dutch East Indies he moved to London, where he lived for 22 years and interacted with scholarly societies and shared his natural history illustrations and collections. The sunbird species Cinnyris lotenius is named after him

== Career ==
=== Early years ===
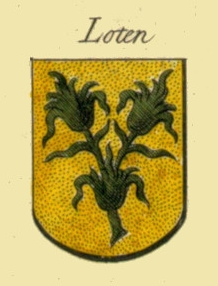
The Loten family coat-of-arms

Joan Gideon Loten, born in Schadeshoeve, a farmstead at Groenekan, near Utrecht he was the eldest son of secretary of the waterboard Joan Carel Loten (1669–1769) and Arnoldina Maria van Aerssen van Juchen (1685–1775). Joan was christened on 18 May at Blauwkapel. His father's mother Constantia Hoeufft was an orthodox Calvinist, but Joan was raised as a part of the Dutch Reformed Church. Later in life he was attracted to Wolffian natural theology. The Loten family originally came from the Southern Netherlands. Circa 1720 Loten lived with his parents and younger brother Arnout (1719–1801) in Utrecht. Loten's early education was at Wijk bij Duurstede. In 1720 he went to study at the Utrecht Hieronymus School where he studied Latin and Greek classics. In 1726 he was a student of the Utrecht University. One of his teachers was Pieter van Musschenbroek who imbued Loten with an interest in astronomy and mathematics. A classmate, Otto de la Porte de Morselede, who died in 1729 from chicken pox, bequeathed his astronomical instruments to Loten which were then used by his brother Arnout. In March 1728 he left University and became a clerk of the Amsterdam Chamber of the Dutch East India Company. By means of patronage of members of his family (likely Balthasar Boreel) Loten was appointed junior merchant of the Company in 1731. A paternal uncle Joseph Loten served in Batavia from 1702 to 1721 but Loten did not hold his uncle in high regard and may instead have been inspired Daniel Bernard Guilliams. Guilliams had been governor of the VOC Coromandel Coast settlements from 1710 to 1716 and his daughter Joanna was married to Johan Strick van Linschoten whose sister Christina Clara became Joseph Loten's wife in 1723 (after the death of his first wife).

=== Servant in the Dutch East Indies ===
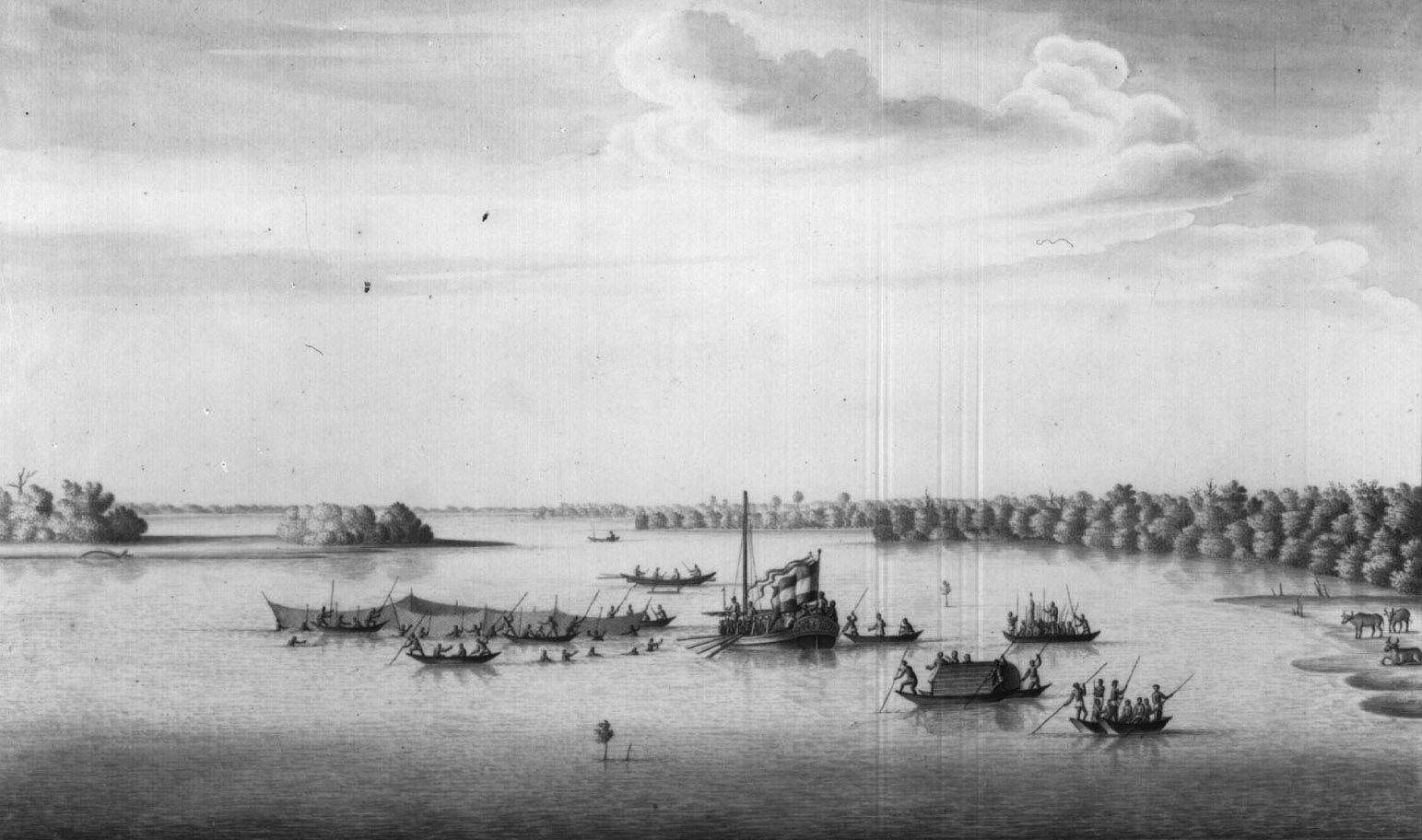
J.G. Loten and others fishing in the River of Nigombo in Ceylon, c. 1754

In January 1732 Loten left the Dutch Republic sailing off from Texel aboard the East India man Beekvliet headed to Batavia (Jakarta) to become a prosecutor at Semarang. He maintained notes on natural history during the voyage. On 24 August 1733 he married Anna Henrietta van Beaumont (1716–1755), a member of a prominent family in Batavia (for example, her uncle Isaak Augustijn Rumpf had been Governor of Dutch Ceylon from 1716 to 1723). As a prosecutor he was involved in meting out punishments to those accused crimes (the judge at the time being Rijkloff Duijvensz). Murderers were to be tortured, branded, and decapitated per contemporary law. He later became an administrator at Semarang and he was largely unaffected by the conflict between the Dutch and Chinese between 1740 and 1743. In 1743 he was elected Governor of Makassar (Ujung Pandang) (1744–1750) to succeed Adriaan Hendrik Smout. He arrived at his post in March 1745 after his appointment as governor-designate in December 1744. During this period general Van Imhoff attempted to promote trade in opium in Batavia and sent out a hundred boxes to Loten. Loten sent them back and although some authors have suggested his actions as being based on morals, Raat suggests that his action was probably the result of there not being a profitable market for opium.

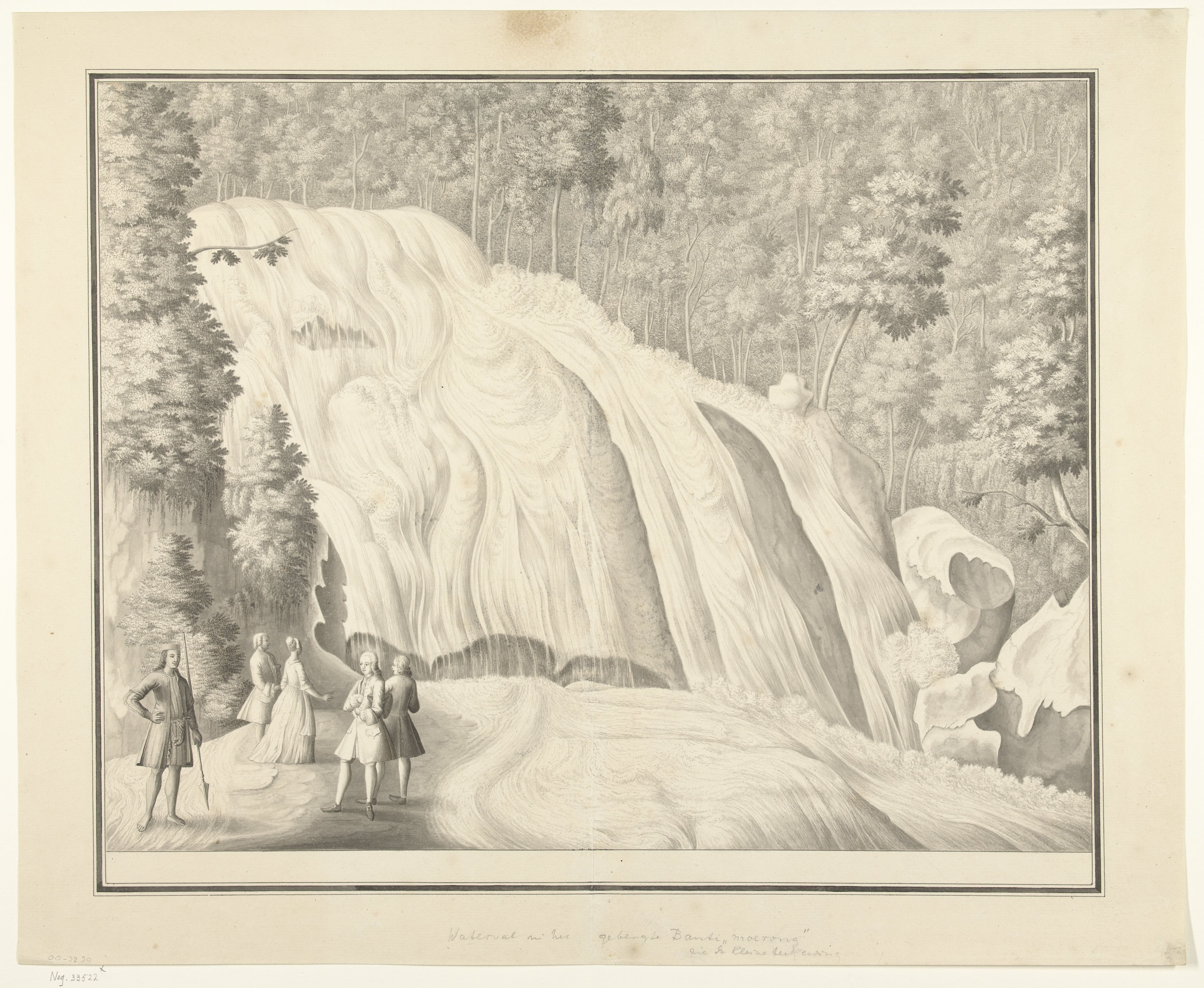
Loten at the Bantimurung waterfall c. 1745

In 1749 he was elected Councillor of the Dutch East Indies and in 1750 appointed councillor extraordinary after the death of van Imhoff. Much of his work involved maintaining relations with local rulers and was involved in setting up a favourable ruler in Bantam in 1752. One of the officers under Loten, George Beens had been privately trading slaves in Boelecomba apart from trading in opium. In 1748 Beens raped a princess travelling on a boat bringing the wrath of her husband Prince Chala, of the Kingdom of Bony. Beens hired Frans Fransz to assassinate Prince Chala in 1749. This was considered by Loten as one of the worst incidents under his administration in Batavia. Gerard Johan Vreeland, the governor of Ceylon died in February 1752 creating a vacancy there. In June 1752 he was appointed Governor of Ceylon and travelled to Colombo on the Ghiessenburg along with his wife, daughter Arnoldina Deliana Cornelia and son-in-law (Dirk Willem Van Der Brugghen). During the five-week voyage, Loten made calculations on a solar eclipse predicted for 6 November 1752 and visible in Batavia. The Ceylon administrator Noël Anthony Lebeck was not favourable to Loten, and there was considerable conflict. Loten was considered a capable administrator although he had to deal with a plague and a cyclone. He was usually respectful of the native population and did not exercise immoderate forms of supremacy. During his administration, he attempted to maintain lowland forests which had cinnamon, and keep them from being converted for agriculture under the Ceylonese rulers. His successor Jan Schreuder was forced into war on this. There is nothing to indicate that he pursued personal wealth by means considered improper or ruthless by his contemporaries. Corruption had been widespread within the VOC and a former Ceylon governor Petrus Vuyst (1726-1729) had been found guilty and executed in 1732. In private letters, Loten held that his predecessor Stein Van Gollenesse had plundered Ceylon. Loten also clashed with Anthonij Mooijaert, an administrator in Jaffna who was extorting money from local rulers and fishery businesses with support from van Gollenesse. Although Loten was successful in the Dutch East Indies, in later years he became embittered against the company and the way the Court of directors in Amsterdam and the Government at Batavia treated its former servants. On 30 July 1755, Loten's two-year-old grandson Albertje (Albert Anthoni Cornelis Van Der Brugghen) died, and the information was kept secret from his ailing wife. On 10 August 1755 Anna Henrietta died after suffering from weakness. Loten noted that she coughed white phlegm and speculated lung infection as the cause of death. She was buried in Colombo within the fort church (and later moved to the Wolvendaal Burial Ground) and Loten's grandson who had initially been buried in the grave of Isaac Rumpf, former Ceylon governor and an uncle of Anna Henrietta, was reburied in Anna's grave. In March 1756, Loten wished to be relieved from his work in Ceylon and move to Batavia to be with his only daughter. On 18 March 1757 he sailed aboard the Sloterdijk to Batavia. The draughtsman Pieter Cornelis de Bevere was also aboard and produced a number of illustrations for Loten including of birds from Java, Banda and Ternate. On 15 May 1757 Loten's daughter Arnoldina Deliana died, and the already strained relationship with his son-in-law snapped. He wrote about van Brugghen - "collecting money by all means all the time is this man's Religion and money is his God." Loten left for Holland on 29 October 1757 aboard the Vrouwe Petronella Maria with a break in the Cape of Good Hope where he met up with Governor Rijk Tulbagh. He suffered from asthma during the voyage and he would continue to suffer from it in Europe.

=== Back to Europe ===
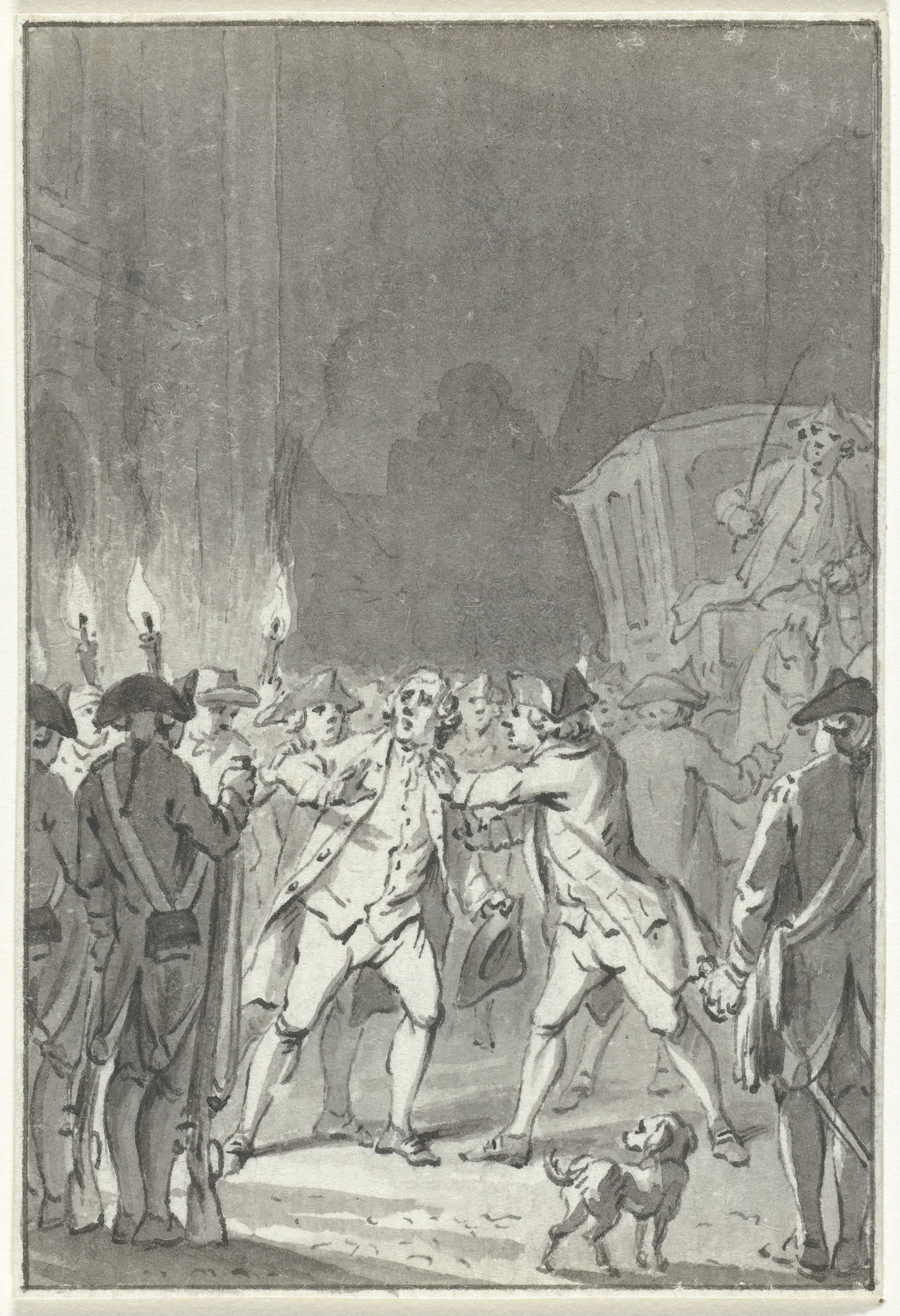
Arnout Loten being attacked by Utrecht residents in 1781.

Loten reached Texel on 15 June 1758, where he was met by his 78-year-old father. Loten was repatriated as Admiral of the Return Fleet in the Dutch Republic in October. He returned to his homeland with an estimated fortune of about 700,000 Dutch guilders. Part of this East Indian fortune came from private trading and emoluments resulting from his offices. The majority of his Indian capital came from the legacy of Nathanael Steinmetz, a former governor and director of Amboyna. He received 48,000 guilders a year as dividend from the Opium Society from 1758 to 1790. The capital afforded Loten financial independence during the rest of his life. Once he returned to the Dutch Republic, he felt like an outsider, excluded from the circles of the aristocratic and patrician class and estranged from his orthodox and narrow-minded Utrecht Calvinistic relatives. This led him to travel to England scarcely ten months after his return from the East Indies. Loten moved in May 1759 to England and lived in London with several interruptions for twenty two years. The city's amusements and cosmopolitan intellectual atmosphere gave him a feeling of freedom. He was elected a Fellow of the Royal Society in November 1760. He was also elected Fellow of the Society of Antiquarians.

He suffered from asthma and tightness of the chest in October 1759. In 1761 he suffered from a bladder inflammation and was treated by Edward Barry. In September 1761 he had an old maid, Sitie, from Celebes moved to England to take care of him. In July 1762 he made a brief visit to Holland. In 1763-64 he undertook a tour through Europe travelling to France, Switzerland, Austria, and Belgium. He returned to London and lived on 8, New Burlington Street. Joseph Banks lived just across his home. He married Laetitia (or Lettice) Cotes (1733-1810), daughter of Digby Cotes (1683-1744) on 4 July 1765 at Banstead. from 1766 to 1767 he lived in Utrecht with his wife. They returned to England but he found himself not being any more integrated into English society as he had hoped after marriage. He however collaborated with Thomas Pennant, Joseph Banks, and Alexander Dalrymple on ''Indian Zoology''. His asthma got worse and his wife's sister Catherine who was widowed in 1766 came to live with them. His relationship with his wife was strained by December 1767. Through Daniel Solander, he found the physician Dr John Fothergill who gave him opiates for the control of asthma. Dr Fothergill also prescribed donkey's milk. His son-in-law van der Brugghen died in 1770 and the Lotens made visits to Utrecht again and much of his time was spent dealing with his health. After Alexander Dalrymple's move to India, he felt increasingly isolated in England and began to dislike it and sought to move to Utrecht in 1775 and lived there until 1776. In 1777 he continued to interact with old friends Banks, and Solander while also making new acquaintances like Sir Ashton Lever. After the outbreak of the Fourth Anglo-Dutch War in 1780. In November 1781 he returned to Utrecht for good after selling off their London home. Brother Arnout Loten was caught up in the Utrecht Patriot revolt or Patriottentijd and lost his position in the city council and would regain it only in 1787. On 25 February 1789 Loten died in his house Cour de Loo at the Utrecht Drift. He was buried in the family crypt in the Jacobi church on 4 March. His maid Sitie was given 2000 guilders by Loten's heirs and 1200 guilders by the executor of Loten's Will. He was buried in the Utrechts Jacobikerk. In Westminster Abbey at London, a monument made by Thomas Banks was erected in his memory in 1795. His widow Lettice Cotes died on 11 June 1810.

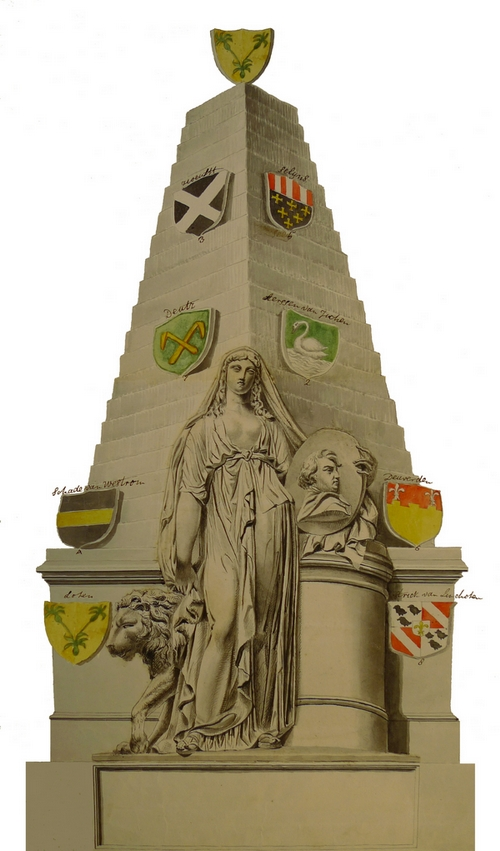
Watercolour by unknown artist of the monument erected in the memory of J .G. Loten in the Westminster Abbey.

== Loten's contribution to natural history ==
Loten was well versed in the zoological, astronomical, genealogical and medical literature of his era. Loten's activities as a collector were those of a virtuoso in the sense that his interest in natural phenomena was based purely upon a fascination with exotic nature and its unique and rare components. He contributed to the collections of Catharina Van Grovestins towards the end of his Ceylon tenure. This was partly to influence his future posting. In England he came in touch with naturalists in the just founded British Museum. Matthieu Maty a Dutch-born Frenchman who had become librarian at the Natural History Museum let Loten visit regularly. He donated watercolours, stuffed birds and minerals to the British Museum. Joseph Banks was Loten's neighbour in London. Joseph Banks, the later President of the Royal Society, accompanied Captain James Cook as a private naturalist on HMS Endeavour (1768–1771). Thanks to Banks, the gentleman naturalist Thomas Pennant and 'the father of British ornithology' George Edwards, Loten's natural history collection was copied and described in several 18th-century English natural history books. The specimens of birds that Loten presented were however destroyed due to the poor techniques used.

At present the Loten collection is preserved in the London Natural History Museum, British Library, Teylers Museum in Haarlem, Rijksprentenkabinet in Amsterdam and Nationaal Archief in The Hague. Documents concerning his colonial career are in the national archive in the Hague. Personal memoirs and letters are dispersed over various collections in England and the Netherlands.

== Sources ==
- Raat, Alexander J.P. (2010). The life of Governor Joan Gideon Loten (1710–1789). A personal history of a Dutch virtuoso (PDF) (in Dutch). Hilversum: Uitgeverij Verloren. ISBN 978-90-8704-151-9.
- Sutherland, Heather (2026). An Indonesian History: Personalized Politics in Makassar and South Sulawesi, c.1600-2018. NUS Press. ISBN 978-981-325-205-9.

Government offices
Preceded by Jacob de Jong as acting governor	Governor of Zeylan; 1757–1762	Succeeded by Jan Schreuder
