= Julius Valentyn Stein van Gollenesse =

Julius Valentijn Stein van Gollenesse

27th Governor of Ceylon
- In office 11 May 1743 – 6 May 1751
- Preceded by: Daniel Overbeek
- Succeeded by: Gerard Joan Vreeland

Julius Valentijn Stein van Gollenesse (17 February 1691, Groel, Sweden - 14 January 1755, Batavia, Dutch East Indies) was the 27th Dutch Governor of Ceylon during the Dutch period in Ceylon. He was appointed on 11 May 1743 and was Governor until 6 May 1751. He was succeeded by Gerard Joan Vreeland.

Stein van Gollenesse was born in Sweden into a family of Mecklenburg. In 1723 he joined the Dutch East India Company (VOC), for which he was commander of Cochin from 1734 to 1743, governor of Ceylon from 1743 until 1751, and finally director-general in Batavia from 1751 until his death.

Government offices
Preceded by Daniel Overbeek	Governor of Ceylon; 1743-1751	Succeeded by Gerard Joan Vreeland
