= Jacob de Jong =

Acting Governor of Ceylon
- In office 26 February 1752 – 10 September 1752
- Preceded by: Gerard Joan Vreeland
- Succeeded by: Joan Gideon Loten

Personal details
- Born: Mannar, Sri Lanka

Jacob de Jong was an acting Governor of Ceylon during the Dutch period in Ceylon. He was appointed on 26 February 1752 and was Governor until 10 September 1752. He was succeeded by Joan Gideon Loten.

== Life and career ==
De Jong was born in Mannar, Sri Lanka as the son of Jacob de Jong Senior, from Veere and in 1722 Commandeur of Jaffna, and Johanna Pasque de Chavonnes, from Hulst. He worked his way up in the Dutch East India Company. He served as special commissioner at the pearl fishery in 1722 and as Dutch Ambassador to the Court of Kandy in 1736. He was promoted to Commandeur' of Galle in 1742 and, like his father, to Commandeur of Jaffna in 1748, before acting as Governor of Ceylon during an interregnum. He was married four times, after his first wife, Elizabeth Mooyaart, died in Galle in October 1747. His fourth wife, Cornelia Schokman, remarried as a widow in 1765.

Government offices
Preceded by Gerard Joan Vreeland	Governor of Ceylon; 1752-1752	Succeeded by Joan Gideon Loten
