= Joan Paul Schaghen =

Acting Governor of Ceylon
- In office 19 October 1725 – 16 September 1726
- Preceded by: Johannes Hertenberg
- Succeeded by: Petrus Vuyst

Joan Paul Schaghen (variable spellings include Jan/Johan(nes), Paulus, and Schagen) (2 November 1689 in Malacca – c. 10 December 1746 in Amsterdam) was an acting Governor of Ceylon in 1725 and 1726 and director-general of the council of the Dutch East India Company in Batavia from 1737 to 1741.

Schagen was the son of Sara Alleta van Genegen and Nicolaas Schaghen, Governor of Malacca 1684–1685, Governor of Dutch Bengal (1685–1688), and finally Governor of Amboina from 1691 till his death in 1696. Joan Paul went to study in the Netherlands, where, in 1716 in Velp, he married Cornelia Theodora van Eck. Cornelia and he had a daughter Magdalena Clara Schaghen. After the death of Cornelia, Joan Paul married Susanna Cornelia Breving in July 1723 in Batavia. After her death he married in 1735 Elisabeth Blanckert, the widow of Josua van Arrewijne. She died on the trip back to the Netherlands and was buried (and saluted) in Cape of Good Hope, in April 1742. In Amsterdam he finally married for the fourth time (announcement 4 November 1745) with the 17-year-old Margaretha Constantia Delborgo.

In 1722 Schaghen became commander of Galle. The VOC appointed him interim governor of Ceylon on 19 October 1725 which position he held until the arrival of Petrus Vuyst on 16 September 1726. Vuyst eventually fired Schaghen, apparently for his insistence for following the rules, but Schaghen was reinstated by the VOC after Vuyst was dismissed for his misrule in 1729. In the early 1730s Schaghen moved to Batavia. In November 1737 he was unanimously voted to become Director General, after the death of the previous office holder, Wijbrant Blom. At his retirement on the last day of 1641 he received the title of Vice-Admiral and was saluted with 9 canon shots on his departure from the Batavia castle He was succeeded as director-general by Herman van Suchtelen. In January 1742 he left for the Netherlands with his stepdaughter Maria Arrewijne. On 12 December 1746 he was buried in the Oude Kerk.

Government offices
Preceded by Johannes Hertenberg	Governor of Ceylon; 1725–1726	Succeeded by Petrus Vuyst
