= Gualterus Woutersz =

Acting Governor of Ceylon
- In office 25 August 1732 – 2 December 1732
- Preceded by: Stephanus Versluys
- Succeeded by: Jacob Christiaan Pielat

Gualterus "Wouter" Woutersz (ca. 1670, Middelburg – 5 February 1759, Batavia, Dutch East Indies) was commander of Jaffna for the Dutch East India Company and interim Governor of Dutch Ceylon between the departure of Stephanus Versluys on 25 August 1732 and the arrival of Jacob Christiaan Pielat on 2 December 1732.

Woutersz was the son of Ursula Wees and Gualterus Woutersz Senior, who in 1681 was schepen of Middelburg. Gualterus Junior arrived in Ceylon in 1689 on board the ship Schoondijk. He married Hester Otley. The couple had five children between 1705 and 1719.

Government offices
Preceded by Stephanus Versluys	Governor of Ceylon; 1732–1732	Succeeded by Jacob Christiaan Pielat
