= Jan Macaré =

Governor of Dutch Ceylon

Acting Governor of Ceylon
- In office 7 June 1736 – 23 July 1736
- Preceded by: Diederik van Domburg
- Succeeded by: Gustaaf Willem van Imhoff

Personal details
- Born: 5 July 1686
- Died: 8 January 1742 (aged 55)

Jan Macaré (also Macare, Maccare; 5 July 1686, in Middelburg – 8 January 1742, in Batavia, Dutch East Indies) was an acting Dutch Governor of Ceylon during an interregnum from 7 June 1736 until 23 July 1736.

Macaré was the fifth son of Susanne Willeboorts (1657–1703) and Pieter Pietersz Macaré (1646–1712), a merchant in Middelburg. In 1700, his father sold his business in Middelburg to join the Dutch East India Company and sailed with his wife and four youngest children, including Jan, on the ship Oostersteyn from January to September 1702 to Batavia. In January 1703, they sailed to Ceylon, where Pieter had been appointed fiscal inspector. Jan's mother died on the way to Ceylon. Jan joined the VOC early on, assisting his father in his work. He moved to Batavia in 1715, where he was schepen in the 1720s. In 1732 he was appointed commander of Galle, returning to Ceylon in October of that year. He disliked the corrupt environment and requested to be returned to Batavia. Before this wish was granted, he was asked to take the position of acting governor of Ceylon after the death of governor Domburgh, awaiting the arrival of the newly appointed governor Van Imhoff. Macaré's provisional administration ended on 23 July 1736, when Gustaaf Willem van Imhoff arrived at Colombo and assumed authority as the newly appointed governor. On his brief watch, the relationship with the Kingdom of Kandy improved. In early 1737, he returned to Batavia, where he died in 1742. In Batavia, Macaré had a relationship with an Indonesian woman, Suzanna van Macassar, with whom he had a daughter, Johanna Adriana Macaré (1730–1779).

Government offices
Preceded by Diederik van Domburg	Governor of Ceylon; 1736–1736	Succeeded by Gustaaf Willem van Imhoff
