= Lubbert Jan van Eck =

Lubbert Jan baron van Eck

31st Governor of Zeylan
- In office 18 February 1762 – 1 April 1765
- Preceded by: Jan Schreuder
- Succeeded by: Anthony Mooyart as acting governor

Personal details
- Born: 26 March 1719 Velp, Gelderland
- Died: 1 April 1765 (aged 46) Colombo

Lubbert Jan baron van Eck (26 March 1719, Velp - 1 April 1765, Colombo) was the 31st Governor of Ceylon during the Dutch period in Ceylon.

Van Eck was the son of Samuel van Eck (1691-1760) and Jacoba Wilhelmina Maria Couttis (c.1695-1740). He inherited the title "Baron" and "lord of Overbeek" from his father. He joined the Dutch East India Company in March 1732. From June 1740 to April 1741 he sailed as "undermerchant" with the ship "Huis van Foreest" to Batavia, Dutch East Indies. In June 1747 he departed to Negapatnam in southern India. By 1748 he had become opperhoofd of Porto Novo, In 1754 he became opperhoofd of Paliacatta. In 1758 he was appointed governor of Coromandel, which function he took in practise in April 1759. Finally, he was appointed Governor of Ceylon on 29 May 1761, but only took over the leadership on 18 February 1762.

Van Eck became governor during a war with the Kingdom of Kandy (1761-1766), started when king Kirti Sri Rajasinha invaded and conquered a number of cities and provinces with the aid of Dutch rebels. In 1762 Van Eck managed to recapture the cities of Matara and Hanwella from the Kandyans. An effort to put a Siamese prince, who had visited Ceylon and had powerful backers among Kandyans, on the Kandyan throne failed. Peace negotiations in 1763 failed as well. With backing of the VOC, Van Eck led two invasion in the Kingdom, but he died in office while the second invasion was still not completed. Iman Willem Falck, his successor, following the acting governor Anthony Mooyart, finally was victorious and the agreement signed in February 1766 was the start of continued peace between the Dutch and Kandyans until the departure of the first from the island in 1798.

Government offices
| Preceded by Jan Schreuder | Governor of Zeylan; 1762-1765 | Succeeded by Anthony Mooyart as acting governor |
