= Petrus Vuyst =

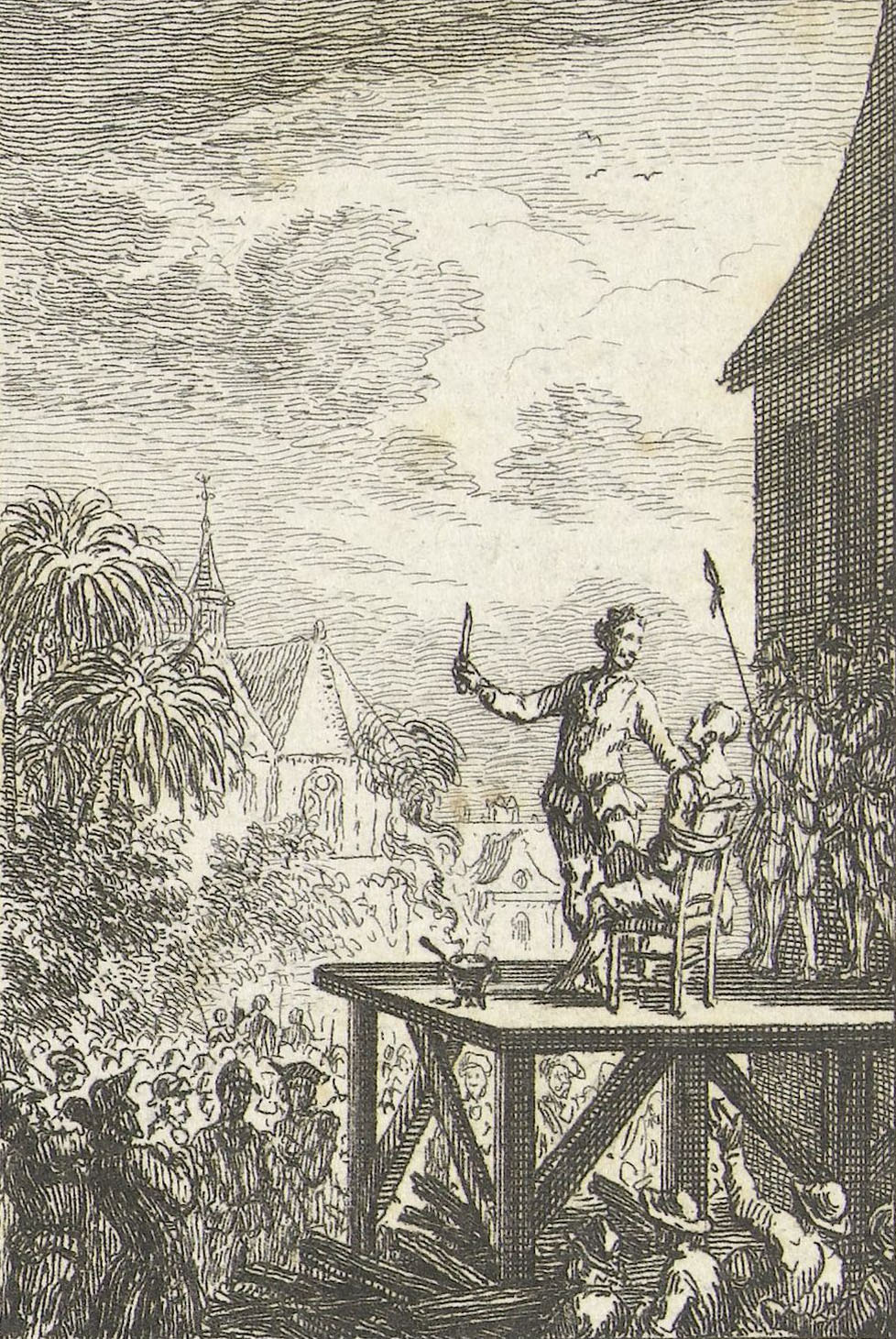
- Execution of Petrus Vuyst for illegally establishing a court martial that executed soldiers and citizens for planning an imagined coup.

20th Governor of Ceylon
- In office 16 September 1726 – 27 August 1729
- Preceded by: Jan Paulus Schagen as acting governor
- Succeeded by: Stephanus Versluys

Personal details
- Born: Petrus Vuijst; 1691 Batavia
- Died: 19 May 1732 (aged 40–41) Batavia
- Spouse: Barbara Wilhelmina Gerlings
- Children: 1

Petrus Vuyst or Vuijst (1691, Alkmaar, Netherlands – 19 May 1732, Batavia) was the 20th Governor of Ceylon during the Dutch colonial period.

== Biography ==
Vuyst was born in Alkmaar as the son of Hendrik Vuyst of Alkmaar (1656–1705) and Maria de Nijs. He returned to the Netherlands for schooling, where he signed in as a student in Leiden in 1711. In Haarlem, he married the local Barbara Wilhelmina Gerlings (1692–1746) in 1714. The couple lived in Leiden where they had one surviving daughter, before leaving for the East Indies on 16 May 1716 on the ship De herstelde Leeuw. He arrived in 1717 in Batavia where he was fiscal lawyer and in 1720 became Extraordinary Council of the Dutch East Indies. Between 1722 and 1724 he was Governor of Dutch Bengal and finally in 1726 was appointed governor of Ceylon.

Vuyst's rule in Ceylon began well, as he ordered the fortifications of the strategic port of Galle to be strengthened, and had a new road built from the Fort of Colombo to the suburb of Mutwal. However, he turned out to be notoriously inept and cruel. At his instigation a number of people, including Dutch settlers and officials, were sentenced to death on false or trumped up charges. He was dismissed from his position in 1729 and summoned to appear before the High Council in Batavia, which found him guilty of "judicial murders" and other serious crimes. He was executed on 19 May 1732. His widow and daughter returned to Holland, where they arrived in Haarlem in June 1733.

Government offices
Preceded by Jan Paulus Schagen as acting governor	Governor of Ceylon; 1726–1729	Succeeded by Stephanus Versluys
