= Kandyan–Dutch war (1670–1675) =

1670–1675 conflict in Sri Lanka

Kandyan-Dutch War
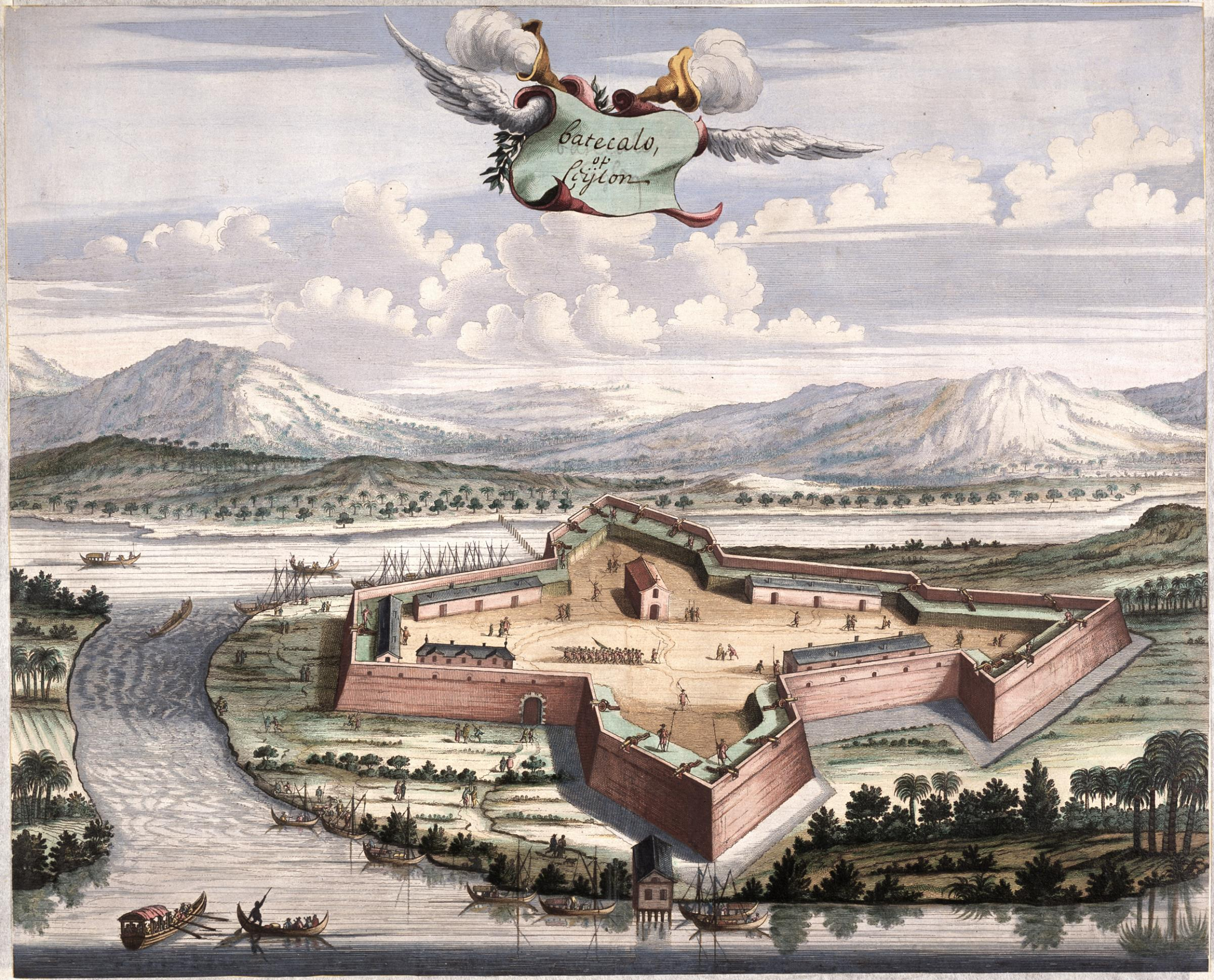
- Fort Batticaloa in 1665
Date	1670–1675 (Note: U can also say it started in 1665 because that what the Dutch started invading but 1670 is when it was officially war and the first major offensive by the Kandyans took place.)
Location	Present day Sri Lanka, and Indian Ocean
Result	Dutch Victory: French expelled from all occupied territories; Expansion of Dutch Ceylon, and Rajasinha's offensives repelled

Belligerents
Kingdom of Kandy; France	Dutch Republic: Dutch East India Company

Commanders and leaders
Rajasinha II of Kandy (Kingdom of France) Jacob Blaquet de la Haye	(Dutch East India Company) Rijckloff van Goens (Dutch East India Company) Rickloff van Goens the Younger

Strength
Army of Kandy: 15,000–30,000 Soldiers; French Fleet: 15 Warships; 2,250+ Soldiers	Army number in Dutch Ceylon unknown but, 14 Vessels to engage the French

The Dutch–Kandyan War of 1670–1675 emerged as a result of territorial ambitions on the part of the Dutch, who sought to extend their dominion. The conflict saw French involvement, potentially at Rajasinha's invitation, although they were ultimately ousted. Consequently, the Dutch managed to expand their territorial holdings, successfully achieving their objectives.

== Background ==
In 1602 the Dutch established strategic installations within Sri Lanka's territory. This initiative was undertaken in collaboration with the Kingdom of Kandy, aimed at displacing the Portuguese presence from the region. During this concerted effort, the Dutch, led by figures like Van Goens, managed to drive out the Portuguese, effectively dislodging them from their foothold.

Van Goens, however, harboured ambitions to regain control over the area known as the "Seven Korales," situated in Chilaw. This region had formerly been part of Portuguese Ceylon and was contested by the Dutch. Despite their efforts, The Dutch gave it to the Kingdom of Kandy

Van Goens was resolute in his determination to reclaim the land, a move that had broader implications. By doing so, he sought to isolate the Kingdom of Kandy and bolster the Dutch East India Company's dominion along the entire coastline. This expansionist strategy was primarily aimed at consolidating control over the lucrative cinnamon trade. Although Van Goens recognized that such territorial expansion might provoke hostilities with the Kingdom of Kandy, he pursued this course of action nonetheless.

=== Dutch expansion ===
Two armies advanced from Colombo to Ruvanvälla and from Galle to Bibilēgama, establishing stockades. Originally aimed at fostering good relations and encouraging migration to lowlands, this effort transformed into outright annexation, encompassing areas like Sabaragamuva and Ratnapura. In 1667, expansion reached Arandara and Alauva, with further fortifications. Although in 1668, uprisings led to temporary Dutch garrison evacuation, posts were later reclaimed. The Dutch reoccupied Trincomalee in September 1665, in line with the king's approval. Rajasinghe's lack of resistance facilitated this relatively easy annexation, boosting Dutch confidence in his waning authority. In 1668, a second eastern expansion occurred, encompassing Batticaloa and Kottiyar. While local submission occurred initially, subsequent revolts were suppressed. In 1669, an expedition from Galle extended control to the Walave River-Arugam Bay area, vital for salt supply and Kandy control. Yāla, Māgama, and Arugam Bay were fortified. This expansion reclaimed former Portuguese territory lost to Kandy in the 1650s. The newly acquired lands were consolidated via local appointments and exemptions from taxes. Rajasinghe's passitivity during this period remains unknown.

=== Response to expansion ===
Consequently, this expansionist pursuit triggered a response from the Kingdom of Kandy, which found itself compelled to address the Dutch advancements and assert its own interests in the region.

== War ==
=== First Kandyan offensive ===
In August 1670, Raja Singha reacted to the VOC's gradual inland expansion by launching assaults on the company's remote forts. First, the attack targeted the Arandora fort, followed by the Ruanwella and Sitawaka forts along the Kelani River's upper stretches. This development proved frustrating for Van Goens, who had consistently asserted that Raja Singha was frail and unresponsive to territorial expansions. However this expedition was of no use, the Dutch reorganized their army and drove the Kandyans back, and gained even more territory. So the VOC's gains under Van Goens's leadership faced a minor challenge from the 1670 Kandyan offensive, which, though not a true threat to the VOC Ceylon stronghold, prompted increased vigilance among the company's leadership. Batavia had opposed some of Van Goens's grander projects, particularly the relocation of the capital and direct communication with Dutch directors, due to potential risks to the High Government. While initially supported by the Ceylonese bureaucracy, Van Goens's policies encountered substantial criticism from VOC personnel within Ceylon in the 1670s, leading to doubts about his strategies and intentions. The portrayal of Kandy played a significant role in Van Goens's endeavours, aiming to secure the directors' endorsement for conquest by depicting Raja Singha as a weak, unpopular, heirless king, thus justifying the VOC's potential takeover of the kingdom.

=== French intervention ===
In May 1669, Louis XIV's minister issued precise directives to Rochefort for preparations concerning an expedition to the East Indies. Emphasizing meticulous planning, the minister instructed the assembly of a substantial fleet destined for the East Indies. While Louis XIV was engaged in forming an anti-Dutch alliance, the fleet was set out in May 1670. On 22 March 1672, as Admiral De La Haye led a French fleet to the vicinity of Ceylon, anchoring in the bay of Trincomalee.

Upon reaching Trincomalee, the Dutch, who held sway over segments of the Maritime Provinces, maintained a modest fort. The unforeseen arrival of the French fleet disconcerted the Dutch, who set ablaze their fort and withdrew, since the French fleet was around ten times their size.

Seizing upon the Dutch departure, the French occupied two central islands within Trincomalee harbour, commencing fortification. These islands were christened Isle de Soleil (Island of the Sun) and Caron by the French, later recognized as Sober Islands during the British era.

During this period, King Rajasinghe II (1629 to December 1687) ruled Kandy and was in conflict with the Dutch. The French found favour with King Rajasinghe, who sought naval support to impede Dutch reinforcements while contending with the Dutch on land. Admiral De La Haye dispatched an emissary with 30 French soldiers to engage in negotiations at the Kandyan court. The emissary, Sieur Desfontaines, was so graciously received that he chose to remain and settle in Kandy. Subsequently, two court officials, accompanied by a sizeable retinue, journeyed to Trincomalee, receiving hospitality aboard French vessels. In the ensuing days, numerous individuals from Kandy arrived to contribute to fortification efforts. Within two months, a treaty was concluded between King Rajasinghe and the French, authorizing the establishment of fortifications to oversee Trincomalee harbour. In short succession, the Governor of Dutch Possessions in Ceylon, Van Goens, arrived with a Dutch fleet to counter the French presence at Trincomalee. They besieged it, and forced it to capitulate on 18 July, the French lost 500 men, and four warships, the French on the other occupied island were left stranded, and eventually withdrew to present day India

=== Second Kandyan offensive ===
Using this failed episode of their French allies, the Kandyans renewed their attacks on Dutch territory including instigating uprisings, however, the Dutch were able to repulse these and even reoccupied former posts. In July 1672 they marched into Sitāvaka and Idangoda and fortified these places. Kandyan attacks in the east continued such as besieging the fort at Chinnecalatte and destroying of buildings in the island of Puliantivu but Kandyans were forced back by Dutch. As a counter move Dutch imposed a trade blockade on Kandy. The year 1674 was less eventful with light raids and uprisings. The year 1674 was less eventful with light raids and uprisings.

=== Third offensive ===
In August 1675 the Kandyans launched the third and largest offensive, with about 17,000 men this time. The attacks from the Seven Kōralēs forced the Dutch to abandon posts at Topture, Tuntote and Arandara. Further, the important fort at Bibilēgama which had been probably reoccupied in about 1674 was besieged and taken. The fall of this fort opened up the road to Mātara, however, the Kandyans did not pursue. Once again the Kandyan offensive had died down because Dutch repelled it and the Dutch were able to reoccupy Sitāvaka, and other occupied forts. That, however, was executed by Governor Rijckloff van Goens Jr. (1675–1679), who had succeeded his father in 1675 Subsequent to the departure of Governor Rijcklof van Goens, and with the Dutch making territorial gains, a peace accord was reached between the two factions. Additionally, the amicable relationship between Rajasingha and Rijcklof van Goens's son played a role, as Rajasingha preferred the less aggressive approach of the latter compared to Rijcklof van Goens.
