= Jacob Christiaan Pielat =

22nd Governor of Ceylon
- In office 2 December 1732 – 27 January 1734
- Preceded by: Gualterus Woutersz as acting governor
- Succeeded by: Diederik van Domburg

Jacques Christian or Jacob Christiaan Pielat (sometimes Pielaat) (27 August 1692, Rotterdam – c. 3 August 1740, Loosduinen) was the 22nd Governor of Ceylon during the Dutch colonial time from 2 December 1732 until 27 January 1734.

Pielat was the sixth child of Phinéas Pielat (1645–1700), a Protestant minister originally from the Principality of Orange, and his second wife Jeanne de Vernatti. Pielat joined the Dutch East India Company and worked his way up to opperkoopman (upper-merchant) in the Dutch Indies. From at least 1720 he was captain and charged with the military accompaniment of goods from Patna to the Dutch factory in Hugly in Dutch Bengal. After a period of being secunde ("vice-governor") in Ternate, he succeeded Johan Happon as governor of Ternate from 1728–29 to 1731. Subsequently, he was appointed Extraordinary Councillor of India. In that capacity, he was sent to Ceylon as a commissioner to investigate the state of the Dutch East India Company Trading post of Ceylon. He reported his findings as a "memoir" for new governor Diederik van Domburg, and returned to the Netherlands where he would die 8 years later. He was buried on 6 August 1740 in The Hague. He was married to Amarante/Amarantha van der Elst (born 1690 in Delft) with whom he had children born in Batavia and Ternate. In 1719, Everard Kraeyvanger wrote a poem for Amaranta in consolation for the loss of two of her children in Batavia. His surviving son Diederik Christiaan would become mayor of Schiedam.

Government offices
Preceded by Gualterus Woutersz as acting governor	Governor of Ceylon; 1732–1734	Succeeded by Diederik van Domburg
