= Stephanus Versluys =

Stephanus Versluijs
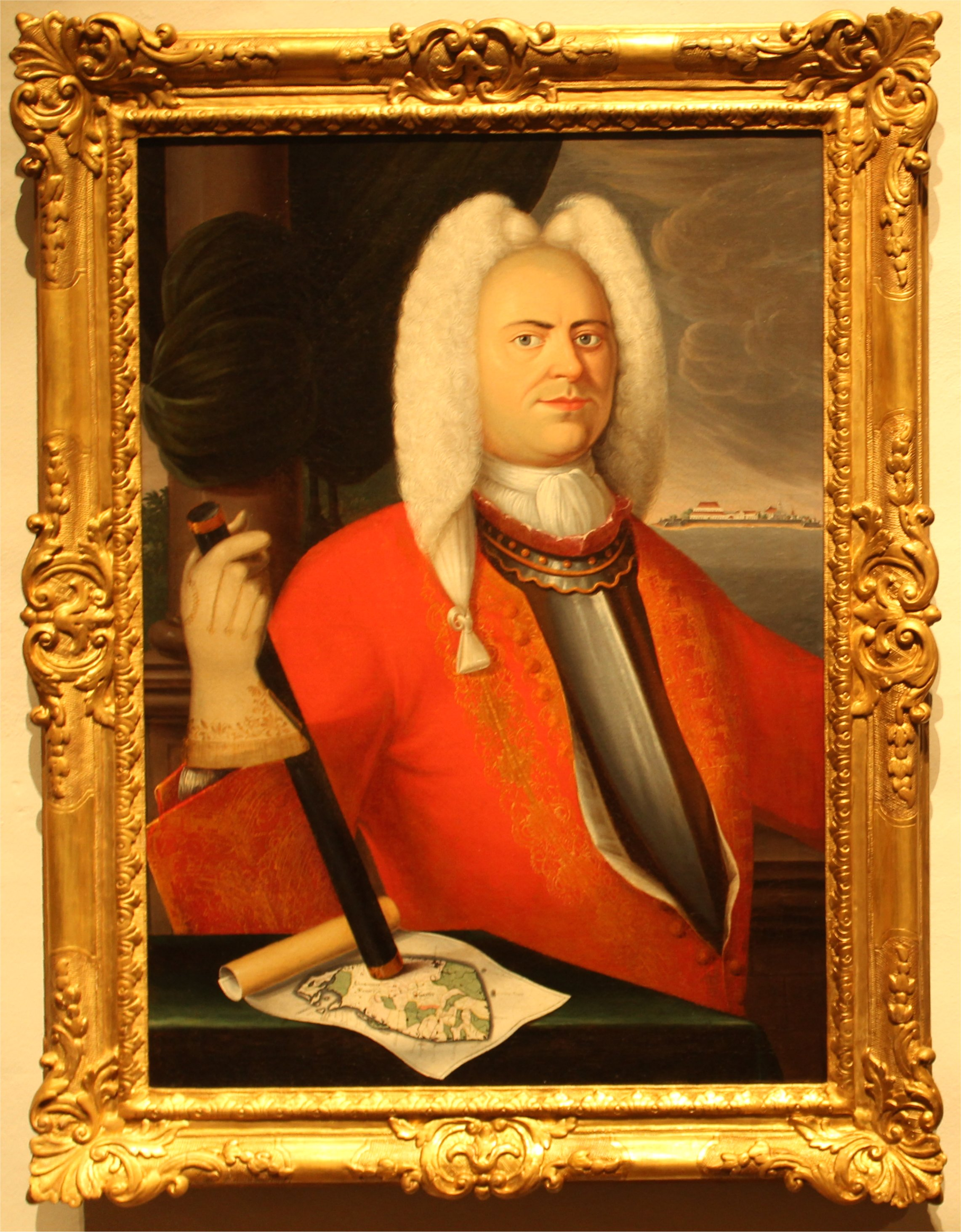

21st Governor of Ceylon
- In office 27 August 1729 – 25 August 1732
- Preceded by: Petrus Vuyst
- Succeeded by: Gualterus Woutersz as acting governor

Stephanus Versluijs or Versluys (20 August 1694, in Middelburg – 27 February 1736, in Batavia, Dutch East Indies) was the 21st Governor of Dutch Ceylon.

Versluijs was the son of Adriana de Muncq and Cornelis Versluijs, mayor of Middelburg and the director of the Dutch East India Company's Zeeland Chamber. At the age of 19 he started to serve the company, arriving in the East Indies on the ship De herstelde Leeuw in 1713. He started as under-merchant in Paliacatte and moved in 1717 to Batavia, where by 1722 he had become upper-merchant. In June 1724 he was appointed Governor of Amboina in Ternate, in 1727 Extraordinary Council of the East Indies in Batavia, and in 1729 as Governor of Ceylon in Colombo to replace Pieter Vuyst, who had been summoned to Batavia for his tyrannical rule (Vuyst was executed in 1732 for his cruelties). In 1732 Versluys was also dismissed as governor, for financial malpractice, and had to appear before the Council of Justice in Batavia. He was imprisoned, but on 5 June 1734 was released on 50,000 rijksdaalders bail. In 1736 he died in Batavia, without having returned to the Netherlands.

Versluijs was married to Adriana de Haan, daughter of Mattheus de Haan, Governor-General of the Dutch East Indies from 1725 to 1729. She died in Batavia July 22, 1727.

Government offices
| Preceded by Petrus Vuyst | Governor of Ceylon; 1729–1732 | Succeeded by Gualterus Woutersz as acting governor |
