= Battle of Mannar (1658) =

Capture of the Island of Mannar by the Dutch

- Part of the Dutch–Portuguese War
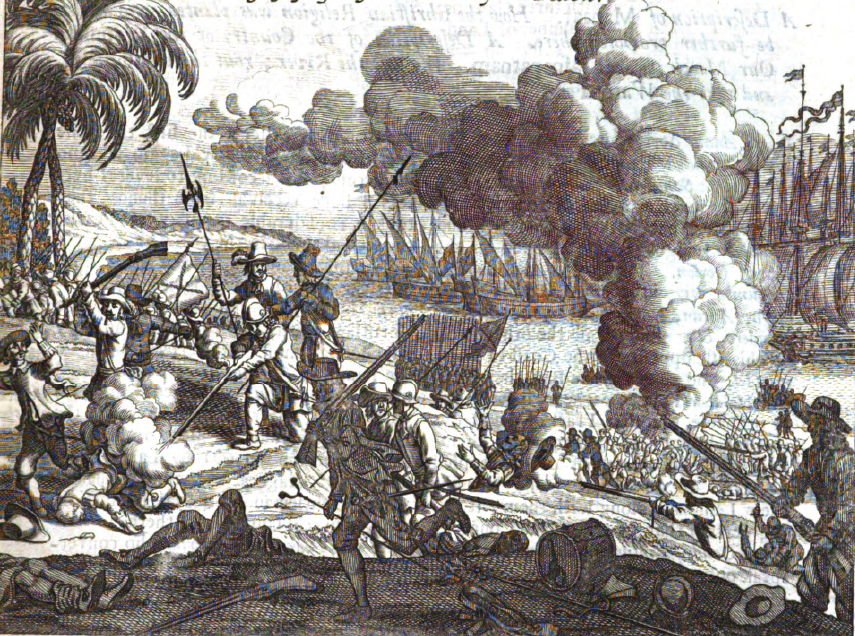
- Depiction of the Battle of Mannar
Date	22 February 1658
Location	Mannar, Sri Lanka
Result	Dutch victory

Belligerents
Dutch Republic: Dutch East India Company	Portugal

Commanders and leaders
(Dutch Republic) Rijckloff van Goens	(Portugal) Antonio de Amaral de Meneses

The Battle of Mannar was a short battle fought between the Dutch and the opposing Portuguese forces on 22 February 1658. This battle, along with the subsequent capture of Jaffna would mark the end of Portuguese Ceylon.

== Background ==
The Dutch, under the leadership of Gerard Pietersz Hulft, placed the main Portuguese base of Colombo under siege in 1655 and captured it. Which then allowed Rijckloff van Goens to launch a campaign, with Mannar being one of his targets.

== Battle ==
Admiral Rijckloff van Goens arrived before Mannar with a large fleet with the goal to capture the remaining Portuguese strongholds in Ceylon, Mannar being one of them. And after a short conflict between the two, the Island of Mannar was subsequently ceded to the Dutch.

== Aftermath ==
After the battle, Rijckloff van Goens marched towards Jaffna and took the city after a siege. This marked the end of Portuguese influence in Ceylon, and would then result in the Dutch and the Kingdom of Kandy splitting the territory of the former Portuguese Ceylon.

== Sources ==
- "The Portuguese in Sri Lanka (1505–1658)". Encyclopædia Britannica.
- Beumer, Willemina G.M (1988). Illustrations and Views of Dutch Ceylon, 1602-1796, A Comprehensive Work of Pictorial Reference with Selected Eye-witness Accounts (E-book ed.). Serendib Publications. pp. 88–89, 93. ISBN 9789004089792.
