= Siege of Nagapatnam (1658) =

Dutch siege of Nagapatnam

- Part of Dutch-Indian conflicts
Date	July 1658
Location	Nagapattinam, India
Result	Dutch victory

Belligerents
Thanjavur Nayak kingdom	Dutch Republic: VOC

Commanders and leaders
Unknown	(Dutch East India Company) Rijckloff van Goens

Strength
10,000 soldiers	400 soldiers

Casualties and losses
400 dead	none

Following a joint military endeavor by the Dutch and Tanjore forces, wherein they laid siege to the Portuguese fortress of Nagapatnam, the Portuguese eventually capitulated. Subsequently, a contingent of 400 Dutch soldiers assumed control of the fortress, effectively impeding the advance of the Tanjore army. Frustrated by this turn of events, the Tanjore forces attempted to reinitiate the siege with their own 10,000-strong military contingent. In an unforeseen twist, the Dutch clandestinely massacred a portion of the Tanjore army, prompting the leader of the Tanjore forces to recognize the need for a retreat. This event highlighted the complex dynamics and strategic maneuvering that characterized this historical confrontation.
