= Cornelis Jan Simonsz =

Dutch colonial governor

Cornelis Simonsz

16th Governor of Dutch Ceylon
- In office 11 May 1703 – 22 November 1707
- Preceded by: Gerrit de Heere
- Succeeded by: Hendrik Becker

1st Fiscal Independent of the Cape Colony
- In office October 1690 – November 1694
- Preceded by: Office established
- Succeeded by: Johan Blesius

Personal details
- Born: Cornelis Jan Simonsz c. 14 October 1661 Enkhuizen, Dutch Republic
- Died: c. 1727 (aged 65–66) Utrecht, Dutch Republic
- Spouse: Agnes Anna Emilius (m. 1683)
- Education: Utrecht University
- Employer: Dutch East India Company

Cornelis Jan Simonsz (c. 14 October 1661 – c. 1727) was a Governor of Dutch Ceylon from 11 May 1703 until 22 November 1707.

Simonsz's exact birth day is unknown, but he is known to have been baptized on 14 October 1661 in Enkhuizen. He studied law and married Agnes Anna Emilius in 1683. Hired by the Dutch East India Company, Simonsz sailed from Amsterdam on 20 May 1690, to arrive at the Dutch Cape Colony on 3 October, where he was installed as its fiscal independent a week later. He left the Cape in November 1694, to become treasurer of Dutch Coromandel on the Indian southeast coast.

In 1701, he left for Batavia in the Dutch East Indies to serve as vice-president of the council of justice. Two years later, he was elected to the office of Governor of Dutch Ceylon and returned to the Indian subcontinent.

Simons instructed and directed the dissava of Jaffnapatnam (Claes Isaaksz) to codify the Thesavalamai ("The Customs of the Land"), which was finished in 1707, and to this day applies to most Tamils in northern Sri Lanka. Simons also initiated building the Leper Hospital in Hendala in the Gampaha District, which was finished in 1708 under his successor Becker.

After his governorship he remained extraordinary member of the Raad van Indië, and, in 1708, he has the title Commissary of the Cape of Good Hope. He left that year from Ceylon via the Cape to the Dutch Republic as admiral of a returning fleet of 18 ships, carrying a cargo with an estimated value of five million guilders.

He re-established himself in the city of Utrecht, where he died in 1727.

== Footnotes ==
Colonial offices
Preceded by Gerrit de Heere	16th Governor of Dutch Ceylon; 1703–1707	Succeeded by Hendrik Becker
