= Willem Jacobszoon Coster =

Dutch colonial governor (c. 1590–1640)

Willem Jacobsz. Coster
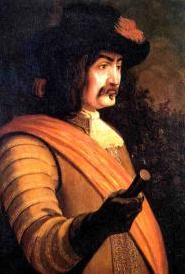

1st Governor of Dutch Ceylon
- In office 13 March – 17 August 1640
- Preceded by: Office established
- Succeeded by: Jan Thyszoon Payart

Personal details
- Born: Willem Jacobszoon Coster; Unknown date, c. 1590; Akersloot, County of Holland, United Dutch Provinces
- Died: 21 August 1640 (aged 49–50); Nilgala, Dutch Ceylon

Military service
- Allegiance: Dutch East India Company
- Rank: Admiral
- Wars: Dutch–Portuguese War

Willem Jacobszoon Coster (c. 1590 – 21 August 1640) was a Dutch colonial governor who served as the first Governor of Dutch Ceylon from 13 March until 17 August 1640. He was succeeded by Jan Thyszoon Payart.

== Ceylon ==
In 1637, the King of Kandy, Rajasingha II, approached the Dutch East India Company (VOC) for military support against the Portuguese occupiers. Admiral Adam Westerwolt was sent to help the king to capture Fort Batticaloa. Coster had arrived in Trincomalee in April 1638, which was already in Dutch hands, and sailed for Batticaloa with three ships and 180 men, where he awaited Westerwolt's arrival.

The admiral arrived with four ships on 10 May, while the troops of the king arrived the next day from inland. On 14 May, the Portuguese surrendered the fort and were deported to the Coromandel Coast. The next week, King Rajasingha signed an agreement with the VOC to allow a monopoly in the trade in cinnamon, amongst others, in exchange for help driving the Portuguese out of his kingdom. After Westerwolt's departure, Coster remained at Fort Batticaloa with 100 men.

In early 1640, the Kingdom of Kandy and the VOC signed another agreement and decided to capture Galle from the Portuguese. Coster arrived with his troops on 8 March, while on 11 March, the King's troops and three VOC ships arrived with 400 sailors and soldiers. On 13 March 1640, the combined troops under command of Coster overpowered Fort Galle and took over the city. The fort was subsequently renamed Fort Akersloot – after Coster's hometown. The High Council decided to install Coster as Governor of Ceylon, with Galle as his residence, where he had a garrison of 200 men.

As part of the agreement, Trincomalee was returned to Kandy. When Rajasingha learned that Coster was reluctant to return more of the conquered land, he had Coster and his seven companions killed near Nilgala—on the way back from Kandy to Batticaloa—in August 1640. Coster's wife was one of the first Dutch women to arrive in Ceylon, in November 1640.

Government offices
Preceded by António de Amaral de Meneses as Governor of Portuguese Ceylon	Governor of Dutch Ceylon; 13 March – 17 August 1640	Succeeded by Jan Thyszoon Payart
