= Anthony Mooyart =

Acting Governor of Ceylon

Acting Governor of Zeylan
- In office 13 May 1765 – 7 August 1765
- Preceded by: Lubbert Jan baron van Eck
- Succeeded by: Iman Willem Falck

Personal details
- Born: 1736
- Died: 1785 (aged 48–49)

Anthony Mooyart (6 December 1698, Jaffna – 1 January 1767, Jaffna) was an acting Governor of Ceylon during the Dutch period in Ceylon. He was appointed on 13 May 1765 and was Governor until 7 August 1765. He was succeeded by Iman Willem Falck.

Mooyart was the son of Nicolaas Mooyart, of Galle, and Johanna van Eschweiler, both burghers from Ceylon. Mooyart studied at Leiden University in the Netherlands. He married Elizabeth Ursula Woutersz in 1725 in Jaffna. By 1739 he was an undermerchant and bookkeeper in Colombo, in 1743 a merchant in Batticaloa and by 1754 an administrator in Jaffna.

Government offices
Preceded by Lubbert Jan baron van Eck	Governor of Zeylan; 1765-1765	Succeeded by Iman Willem Falck
