= Thomas van Rhee =

Dutch colonial governor

13th Governor of Dutch Ceylon
- In office 19 June 1693 – 22 February 1697
- Preceded by: Laurens van Pyl
- Acting governor: Paulus de Roo (Jan–Aug 1695)
- Succeeded by: Gerrit de Heere

Personal details
- Born: 16 December 1634; Wijk bij Duurstede, Dutch Republic
- Died: 31 March 1701 (aged 66); Batavia, Dutch East India
- Spouse: Henrietta Kriekenbeek (m. 1661)

Thomas van Rhee (16 December 1634 – 31 March 1701) was a Governor of Dutch Ceylon.

== Career ==
In 1659, he arrived in Batavia in the Dutch East Indies. From 1674 until 1678, he worked in Negapatnam. He was appointed Governor of Dutch Ceylon on 19 June 1693, and held the post until 29 January 1695, when he became Council of India. He was succeeded by Gerrit de Heere.

== Footnotes ==
Colonial offices
Preceded by Laurens van Pyl	13th Governor of Dutch Ceylon; 1693–1697 with Paulus de Roo (1695)	Succeeded by Gerrit de Heere
