= Paulus de Roo =

Dutch colonial governor

Acting Governor of Dutch Ceylon
- In office 29 January – 9 August 1695
- Preceded by: Thomas van Rhee
- Succeeded by: Thomas van Rhee

Personal details
- Born: c. 14 July 1658 Batavia, Dutch East Indies
- Died: 9 August 1695 (aged 37) Suratte, Dutch India
- Spouse: Margaretha Kock

Paulus de Roo (c. 14 July 1658 – 9 August 1695) was a Governor of Dutch Ceylon during the Dutch period in Ceylon.

De Roo was appointed acting governor on 29 January 1695, and remained at his post until his death.

== Footnotes ==
Colonial offices
Preceded by Thomas van Rhee	Acting Governor of Dutch Ceylon; 1695	Succeeded by Thomas van Rhee
