= Laurens van Pyl =

12th Governor of Dutch Ceylon
- In office 3 December 1680 – 19 June 1693
- Preceded by: Rijckloff van Goens Jr.
- Succeeded by: Thomas van Rhee

Laurens van Pyl was a Dutch colonial administrator who held the post of Governor of Dutch Ceylon. He was appointed on 3 December 1680, and was governor until 19 June 1693. He was succeeded by Thomas van Rhee.

He gave new meaning to the Ceylon policy that the VOC was forced to formulate after the King of Kandy in 1670 a number of areas had recaptured. Arrow tried to maintain good relations with the powerful empire in the interior and in 1683 was still some areas off the kingdom. King Rajasinghe II showed a number of Europeans who have been years in captivity were free. After the accession of Vimaladharmasurya II in December 1687 two envoys visited the governor stating all slaves who kept chained Company released him. However, the port on the west coast in the hands of the Company and the rest of the coast was blocked so that trade with the outside world was dominated entirely by the Company. Arrow tried with an ordinance against the pursuit and dissemination of Roman Catholicism (1 July 1682) the influence of these "valsse and false doctrine" to contain. There were "Veele creatures of Portugeesen" within the colony and their meetings and were now "miss off other exercitiën of the Romish ceremonies pauselijcke off" forbidden. Under his rule and that of his successor Rhee was the flora of the island studied and watercolors depicted.

== Footnotes ==
Government offices
Preceded by Rijckloff van Goens Jr.	Governor of Dutch Ceylon; 1680–1693	Succeeded by Thomas van Rhee
