= Diederik van Domburg =

23rd Governor of Zeylan
- In office 27 January 1734 – 7 June 1736
- Preceded by: Jacob Christian Pielaat
- Succeeded by: Jan Maccare as acting governor

Personal details
- Died: 1736

Diederik van Domburg (15 October 1685, Utrecht – 7 June 1736, Colombo) was the 23rd Governor of Zeylan during the Dutch period in Ceylon. He was appointed on 27 January 1734 and was Governor until 7 June 1736. He was succeeded by acting Governor Jan Maccare.

Government offices
Preceded by Jacob Christian Pielaat	Governor of Zeylan; 1734–1736	Succeeded by Jan Maccare as acting governor
