= Joan Maetsuycker =

Dutch colonial governor (1606–1678)

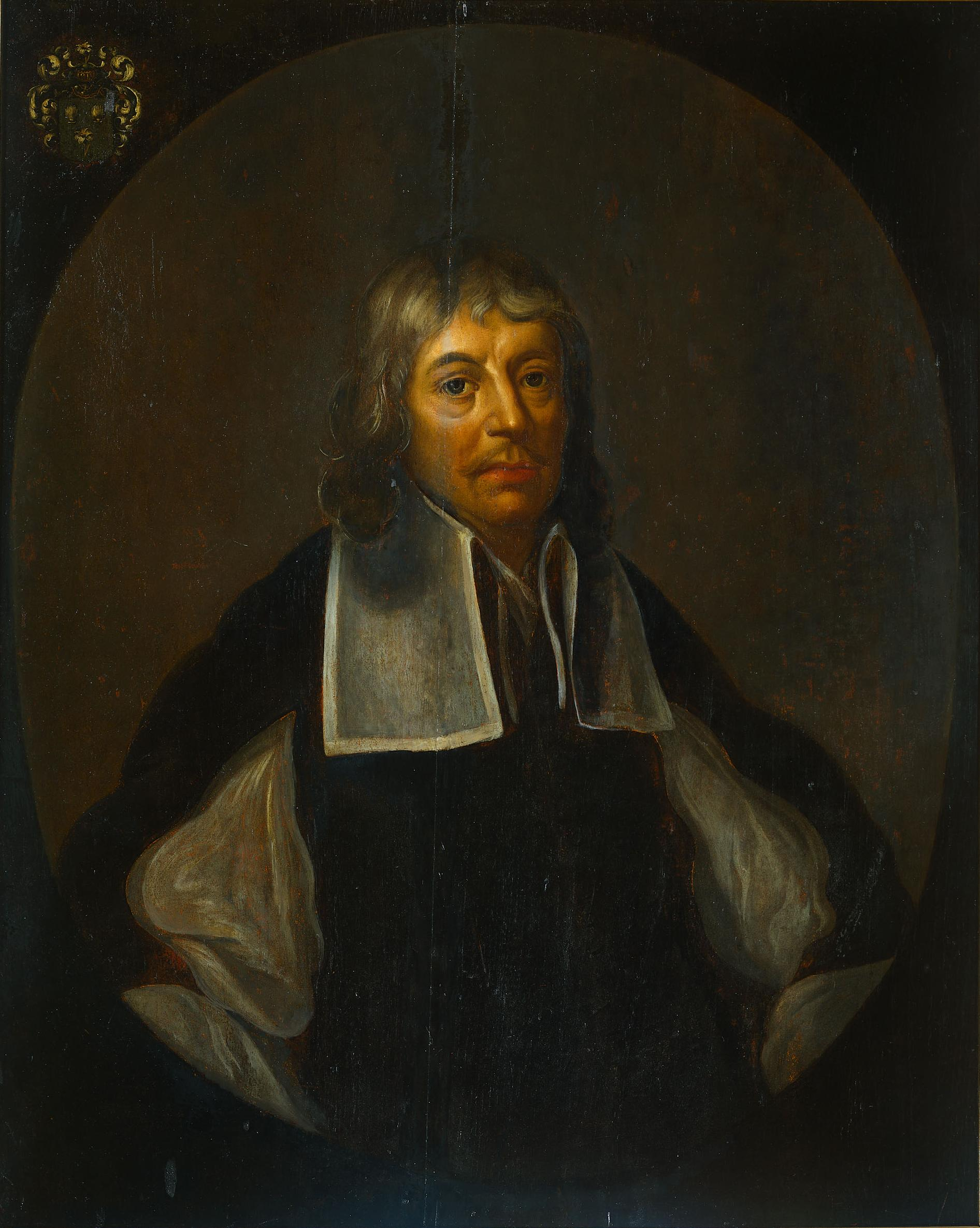

3rd Governor of Zeylan
- In office 24 March 1646 – 26 February 1650
- Preceded by: Jan Thyszoon Payart
- Succeeded by: Jacob van Kittensteyn

Governor-General of the Dutch East Indies
- In office 1653–1678
- Preceded by: Carel Reyniersz
- Succeeded by: Rijcklof van Goens

Personal details
- Born: 14 October 1606 Amsterdam, Dutch Republic
- Died: 24 January 1678 (aged 71) Batavia, Dutch East Indies

Joan Maetsuycker (14 October 1606 – 24 January 1678) was the Governor of Zeylan during the Dutch period in Ceylon, and Governor-General of the Dutch East Indies from 1653 to 1678.

== Early life and education ==
Joan Maetsuycker was born in Amsterdam on 14 October 1606.

He studied law in Leuven, and was a lawyer first in The Hague, and later in Amsterdam.

== Career ==
From 1636, Maetsuycker lived in the Dutch East Indies. He was appointed as Governor of Zeylan on 24 March 1646 and was governor until 26 February 1650. He was succeeded by Jacob van Kittensteyn. He was the third Dutch governor of Zeylan.

Seven years later, in 1657 he became the Governor-General of the Dutch East Indies. He stayed on that post for 25 years, which is the longest period for any governor-general. The Dutch colony in the Indies flourished under Maetsuycker. Under his rule, the Portuguese lost Ceylon (1658), the coast of Coromandel (1658) and Malabar (1663); Makassar was conquered (1667), the west coast of Sumatra was occupied, and the first expedition to the interior of Java was held.

As Governor-General of the Dutch East Indies, he also issued edicts in the Dutch Cape Colony, including one in 1657 which allowed those Muslims brought from the Dutch East Indies to the Cape as servants or slaves to practise their religion, but not in public. They were also prohibited from attempting to convert anyone, on pain of death. Between the years 1671 and 1678 Maetsuycker worked closely with Pieter de Graeff, bewindhebber of Dutch East India Company at Amsterdam.

== Personal life ==
In 1663 Maetsuycker's wife, Haesje Berckmans, died. In 1664, he married the 24-year-old Elisabeth Abbema, daughter of the preacher Fredericus Abbema and widow of Simon Cos, governor of Ambon. In 1671, the splendour-loving Elisabeth caused some controversy when she had gold coins imported from Japan, outside of the rule of the Dutch East India Company (VOC). Her aim was to have her brother-in-law in Suratte buy them.

He died on 4 January 1678 in Batavia, Dutch East Indies.
