= Jan Thyszoon Payart =

2nd Governor of Zeylan
- In office 1 August 1640 – 24 March 1646
- Preceded by: Willem Jacobszoon Coster
- Succeeded by: Joan Maetsuycker

Jan Thyszoon Payart was a Dutch statesman and administrator who served as the governor of Zeylan (Dutch Ceylon) during the early Dutch period in Ceylon. He was appointed on 1 August 1640 and was governor until 24 March 1646. He was succeeded by Joan Maetsuycker. He was also the governor of Dutch Malacca between 1646 and 1662.

Government offices
Preceded by Willem Jacobszoon Coster	Governor of Zeylan; 1640–1646	Succeeded by Joan Maetsuycker
