= Jan Schreuder =

Dutch colonial governor (1704 – 1764)

30th Governor of Zeylan
- In office 17 March 1757 – 17 September 1762
- Preceded by: Joan Gideon Loten
- Succeeded by: Lubbert Jan baron van Eck

Jan Schreuder (12 February 1704 in Hamburg – 16 January 1764 in Batavia, Dutch East Indies) was the 30th Governor of Zeylan during the Dutch period in Ceylon. He was appointed on 17 March 1757 and was Governor until 17 September 1762. He was succeeded by Lubbert Jan baron van Eck.

Government offices
Preceded by Joan Gideon Loten	Governor of Zeylan; 1757-1762	Succeeded by Lubbert Jan baron van Eck
