= Adriaan van der Meyden =

Dutch colonial governor of Ceylon

5th Governor of Zeylan
- In office 11 October 1653 – 12 May 1660
- Preceded by: Jacob van Kittensteyn
- Succeeded by: Rijckloff van Goens

7th Governor of Zeylan
- In office 1661–1663
- Preceded by: Rijckloff van Goens
- Succeeded by: Rijckloff van Goens

Adriaan van der Meyden was the two time Governor of Zeylan during the Dutch period in Ceylon. He was first appointed on 11 October 1653 and was Governor until 12 May 1660, when he was succeeded by Rijckloff van Goens. His second term lasted from 1661 to 1663.

== Footnotes ==
Government offices
Preceded by Jacob van Kittensteyn	Governor of Dutch Ceylon; 1653–1660	Succeeded by Rijckloff van Goens
Preceded by Rijckloff van Goens	Governor of Dutch Ceylon; 1661–1663	Succeeded by Rijckloff van Goens
