= Gerrit de Heere =

Dutch colonial governor

14th Governor of Dutch Ceylon
- In office 22 February 1697 – 26 November 1702
- Preceded by: Thomas van Rhee
- Succeeded by: Cornelis Jan Simonsz

Chief Trader at Dejima
- In office 19 October 1693 – 7 November 1694
- Preceded by: Hendrick van Buijtenhem
- Succeeded by: Hendrik Dijkman

Personal details
- Born: Gerrit Jansz de Heere; 1 March 1657; Amsterdam, Dutch Republic
- Died: 26 November 1702 (aged 45); Colombo, Dutch Ceylon
- Spouse: Johanna van Riebeeck (m. 1695)

Gerrit Jansz de Heere (1 March 1657 – 26 November 1702) was a Governor of Dutch Ceylon during its Dutch period.

== Biography ==
De Heere was the son of Johan Gerritsz de Heere and Marritje Gerrits. From 1693 until 1694, he served as Chief Trader at Dejima, after which he became a senior merchant in Batavia, capital of the Dutch East Indies. In 1695, he married Johanna Maria van Riebeeck, who was 22 years his junior and a daughter of Abraham van Riebeeck as well as a granddaughter to Jan van Riebeeck, founder of Cape Town.

De Heere was appointed Governor of Dutch Ceylon on 22 February 1697, which he remained until his death on 26 November 1702, and was succeeded by Cornelis Jan Simonsz.

== Footnotes ==
Business positions
Preceded by Hendrick van Buijtenhem	Chief Trader at Dejima; 1693–1694	Succeeded by Hendrik Dijkman
Colonial offices
Preceded by Thomas van Rhee	14th Governor of Dutch Ceylon; 1697–1702	Succeeded by Cornelis Jan Simonsz
