= Gerard Joan Vreeland =

28th Governor of Zeylan
- In office 6 May 1751 – 26 February 1752
- Preceded by: Julius Valentyn Stein van Gollenesse
- Succeeded by: Jacob de Jong as acting governor

Gerard Joan Vreeland (27 November 1711, Utrecht – 26 February 1752, Colombo) was the 28th governor of Ceylon during the Dutch period in Ceylon. He was appointed on 6 May 1751 and was governor until 26 February 1752. He was succeeded by acting governor Jacob de Jong.

Government offices
Preceded by Julius Valentyn Stein van Gollenesse	Governor of Zeylan; 1751–1752	Succeeded by Jacob de Jong as acting governor
