= Arnold Moll =

Governor of Zeylan

Acting Governor of Zeylan
- In office 21 June 1723 – 12 January 1724
- Preceded by: Isaak Augustyn Rumpf
- Succeeded by: Johannes Hertenberg

Personal details
- Born: 5 May 1675 Batavia, Dutch East Indies
- Died: 10 February 1729 (aged 53) Jaffna

Arnold Moll (5 May 1675 – 10 February 1729) was the Dutch commander of Jaffanapatnam from 1723 to 1725 and acting Governor of Ceylon from 21 June 1723 to 12 January 1724. He previously had been merchant on Ambon and since 1707 Commander of Galle. He was also a member of the Council of the Dutch East Indies. He married the baroness Christina van Reede (1690–1731) with whom he had three daughters.

Government offices
Preceded by Isaak Augustyn Rumpf	Governor of Zeylan; 1723–1724	Succeeded by Johannes Hertenberg
