= Jacob van Kittensteyn =

4th Governor of Dutch Ceylon
- In office 26 February 1650 – 11 October 1653
- Preceded by: Joan Maetsuycker
- Succeeded by: Adriaan van der Meyden

Jacob van Kittensteyn was the Governor of Dutch Ceylon during the Dutch period in Ceylon. He was appointed on 26 February 1650 and was Governor until 11 October 1653. He was succeeded by Adriaan van der Meyden.

== Footnotes ==
Government offices
Preceded by Joan Maetsuycker	Governor of Dutch Ceylon; 1650–1653	Succeeded by Adriaan van der Meyden
