= Elisabeth Abbema =

Dutch governor's wife

Elisabeth Abbema (1638–1674), was a Dutch governor's wife.

She was born to the preacher Fredricus Abbema (1610–1659) and Cecilia Elisabeth du Vayer. She married in 1656 to Simon Cos (d. 1664), governor of Amboina 1662–1664, and in 1664 to Joan Maetsuycker (1606–1678), general governor of Batavia in 1653–1678. She is described as an intelligent beauty who used her elite position in society to exert influence. Her relationship with her temperamental second spouse was difficult, and their numerous conflicts have been the subject of legends and stories of how she managed to trick him and win over him in their conflicts, often with the support of other women in Batavia.
