= Treaty of Batticaloa =

1766 treaty between Dutch Ceylon and Kandy

The Treaty of Batticaloa (or the Hanguranketha Treaty) was signed on 14 February 1766 between Dutch Ceylon governor Wilhelm Falk and King Keerthisiri Rajasinghe of Kandy. In Colombo, Dumbararala led five emissaries to negotiate the terms of the treaty. Eventually, 25 clauses were established in the agreement.

== Terms ==
Based on the terms of the treaty, King Rajasinghe was forced to pay 10 million florins to the Dutch in reparations. The king had to acknowledge Dutch imperial possessions in Colombo, Matara, Kalpitiya, Galle, Trincomalee, Mannar, and Batticaloa. The Dutch imposed their imperial authority on the coastlines of Sri Lanka whereby their influence would be recognized by the king four miles from the coast into the countryside. The Kingdom of Kandy was forbidden to engage in relations with foreign traders, as well as establish agreements with foreign nations against the Dutch Empire. The Dutch would govern the kingdom's cinnamon peeling industry.

King Rajasinghe attempted to convince the Dutch imperial government to make alterations to the treaty. No amendments or changes to the treaty were made.

== See also ==
- List of treaties
