= List of governors of Dutch Ceylon =

The following is a list of governors of Dutch Ceylon. The Dutch arrived on the island of Ceylon on 2 May 1639. Parts of the island were incorporated as a colony administered by the Dutch East India Company on 12 May 1656. The first governor, Willem Jacobszoon Coster, was appointed on 13 March 1640.

== List of governors ==
Acting governor

No.	Governor	Term start	Term end	Notes
1	Willem Jacobszoon Coster	13 March 1640	1 August 1640	
2	Jan Thyszoon Payart	1 August 1640	24 March 1646	
3	Joan Maetsuyker	24 March 1646	26 February 1650	
4	Jacob van Kittensteyn	26 February 1650	11 October 1653	
5	Adriaan van der Meyden	11 October 1653	12 May 1660	
6	Rijckloff van Goens	12 May 1660	1661	
7	Adriaan van der Meyden	1661	1663	
8	Rijckloff van Goens	1663	1663	
9	Jacob Hustaert	27 December 1663	19 November 1664	
10	Adriaen Roothaes	19 November 1664	April 1665	
11	Rijckloff van Goens	April 1665	1675	
12	Ryklof van Goens de jonge	1675	2 December 1679	
13	Laurens van Pyl	3 December 1679	19 June 1693	
14	Thomas van Rhee	19 June 1693	29 January 1695	
15	Paulus de Roo	29 January 1695	30 July 1695	
16	Thomas van Rhee	9 August 1695	22 February 1697	
17	Gerrit de Heere	22 February 1697	26 November 1702	
18	Cornelis Jan Simonsz	11 May 1703	22 November 1707	
19	Hendrik Becker	22 November 1707	6 December 1716	
20	Isaak Augustijn Rumpf	5 December 1716	11 June 1723	
21	Arnold Moll	21 June 1723	12 January 1724	
22	Johannes Hertenberg	12 January 1724	19 October 1725	
23	Joan Paul Schaghen	19 October 1725	16 November 1726	
24	Petrus Vuyst	16 September 1726	27 August 1729	
25	Stephanus Versluys	27 August 1729	25 August 1732	
26	Gualterus Woutersz	25 August 1732	2 December 1732	
27	Jacob Christiaan Pielat	2 December 1732	27 January 1732	
28	Diederik van Domburg	27 January 1734	7 June 1736	
29	Jan Macaré	7 June 1736	23 July 1736	
30	Gustaaf Willem van Imhoff	23 July 1736	12 March 1740	
31	Willem Maurits Bruyninck	12 March 1740	8 January 1742	
32	Daniel Overbeek	8 January 1742	11 May 1743	
33	Julius Valentyn Stein van Gollenesse	11 May 1743	6 May 1751	
34	Gerard Joan Vreeland	6 May 1751	26 February 1752	
35	Jacob de Jong	26 February 1752	10 September 1752	
36	Joan Gideon Loten	10 September 1752	17 March 1757	
37	Jan Schreuder	17 March 1757	17 September 1762	
38	Lubbert Jan baron van Eck	17 September 1762	1 April 1765	
39	Anthony Mooyart	13 May 1765	7 August 1765	
40	Iman Willem Falck	7 August 1765	5 February 1785	
41	Willem Jacob van de Graaf	7 February 1785	15 July 1794	
42	Johan van Angelbeek	15 July 1794	16 February 1796	

== See also ==
- List of Governors of Portuguese Ceylon (1594–1698)

== Sources ==
- Cahoon, B. "Sri Lanka". World Statesmen.
