= Jacob Hustaert =

9th Governor of Dutch Ceylon
- In office 27 December 1663 – 19 November 1664
- Preceded by: Rijckloff van Goens
- Succeeded by: Rijckloff van Goens

Personal details
- Born: bap. 10 September 1619; Amsterdam
- Died: 10 July 1665; Batavia

Jacob Hustaert was a Governor of Dutch Ceylon during the Dutch period in Ceylon. He was the son of Pieter Hustaert from Antwerp and Elisabeth Moucheron from Middelburg. In 1645 he was stationed on the Moluccas and became the governor of Ambon; in 1662 of the Coromandel. He was appointed on 27 December 1663, and was governor of Ceylon until 19 November 1664. He was succeeded by Rijckloff van Goens.

== Footnotes ==
Government offices
Preceded by Rijckloff van Goens	Governor of Dutch Ceylon; 1663–1664	Succeeded by Rijckloff van Goens
