= Isaak Augustijn Rumpf =

Governor of Dutch Ceylon (1673–1723)

18th Governor of Dutch Ceylon
- In office 5 December 1716 – 21 June 1723
- Preceded by: Hendrik Bekker
- Succeeded by: Arnold Moll acting governor

Personal details
- Born: November 21, 1673 The Hague
- Died: June 11, 1723 Colombo

Isaak Augustijn Rumpf (1673–1723) was a governor of Dutch Ceylon. He was appointed on 5 December 1716 and was Governor until 11 June 1723, when he died in office.

== Family life ==
Rumpf (sometimes spelled Rumph) was the son of the diplomat Christiaan Constantijn Rumpf (1633, The Hague – 1706, Stockholm) and Elisabeth Pierrat de Longueville (1646–1675). He obtained a Doctor of Laws degree at Leiden University and left for the Indies early in 1707. En route, on 26 June 1707 in Cape Town, he married Gijsberta Joanna Blesius (born 1686, Cape Town). Isaak and Gijsberta had a daughter Susanna. Gijsberta remarried in 1726 as widow Rumpf with Mr. Everhard Kraayvanger of Macassar, Advocate Fiscaal of India.

Government offices
Preceded by Hendrik Bekker	Governor of Dutch Ceylon; 1716–1723	Succeeded by Arnold Moll as acting governor
