= Rijckloff van Goens Jr. =

12th Governor of Dutch Ceylon
- In office 1675–1680
- Preceded by: Rijckloff van Goens
- Succeeded by: Laurens van Pyl

Rijckloff van Goens Jr. was a Governor of Dutch Ceylon during its Dutch period.

He was appointed in 1675 and was Governor until 1680. He was succeeded by Laurens van Pyl.

== Footnotes ==
Government offices
Preceded by Rijckloff van Goens	Governor of Dutch Ceylon; 1675–1680	Succeeded by Laurens van Pyl
