= Iman Willem Falck =

Dutch colonial governor

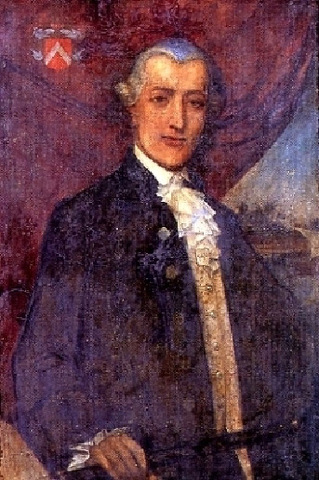
- Iman Willem Falck portrayed by the student of the Rijksacademie van Beeldende Kunsten in 1908

32nd Governor of Zeylan
- In office 7 August 1765 – 5 February 1785
- Preceded by: Anthony Mooyart as acting governor
- Succeeded by: Edward Hughes

Personal details
- Born: 25 March 1736 Colombo, Dutch Ceylon
- Died: 6 February 1785 (aged 48) Colombo, Dutch Ceylon

Iman Willem Falck (25 March 1736 – 6 February 1785) was a Dutch colonial governor who served as the 32nd Governor of Zeylan during the Dutch period in Ceylon. He was appointed on 7 August 1765 and was Governor until 5 February 1785. He was succeeded by Edward Hughes.

== Biography ==
He was the son of Frans Willem Falck, of Cologne, and Adriana Gobius, of Samarang. He married Theodora Rudolpha de Wendt in 1763.

Shortly after taking office as governor, after a quarter century of hostilities, a treaty was made with the king of Kandy, Kirti Sri Rajasinha, on February 14, 1766 in Colombo . The entire coastal area and cinnamon all districts remained in the hands of the East India Company, while Kandy was not to collude with other powers. As compensation, the king was a share of the profits promised to trade in elephants. The king sent a delegation to Batavia to negotiate favorable peace terms, but there was Van der Parra, cousin Iman Falck, Governor General. The provisions of the peace treaty were -dus- not softened.

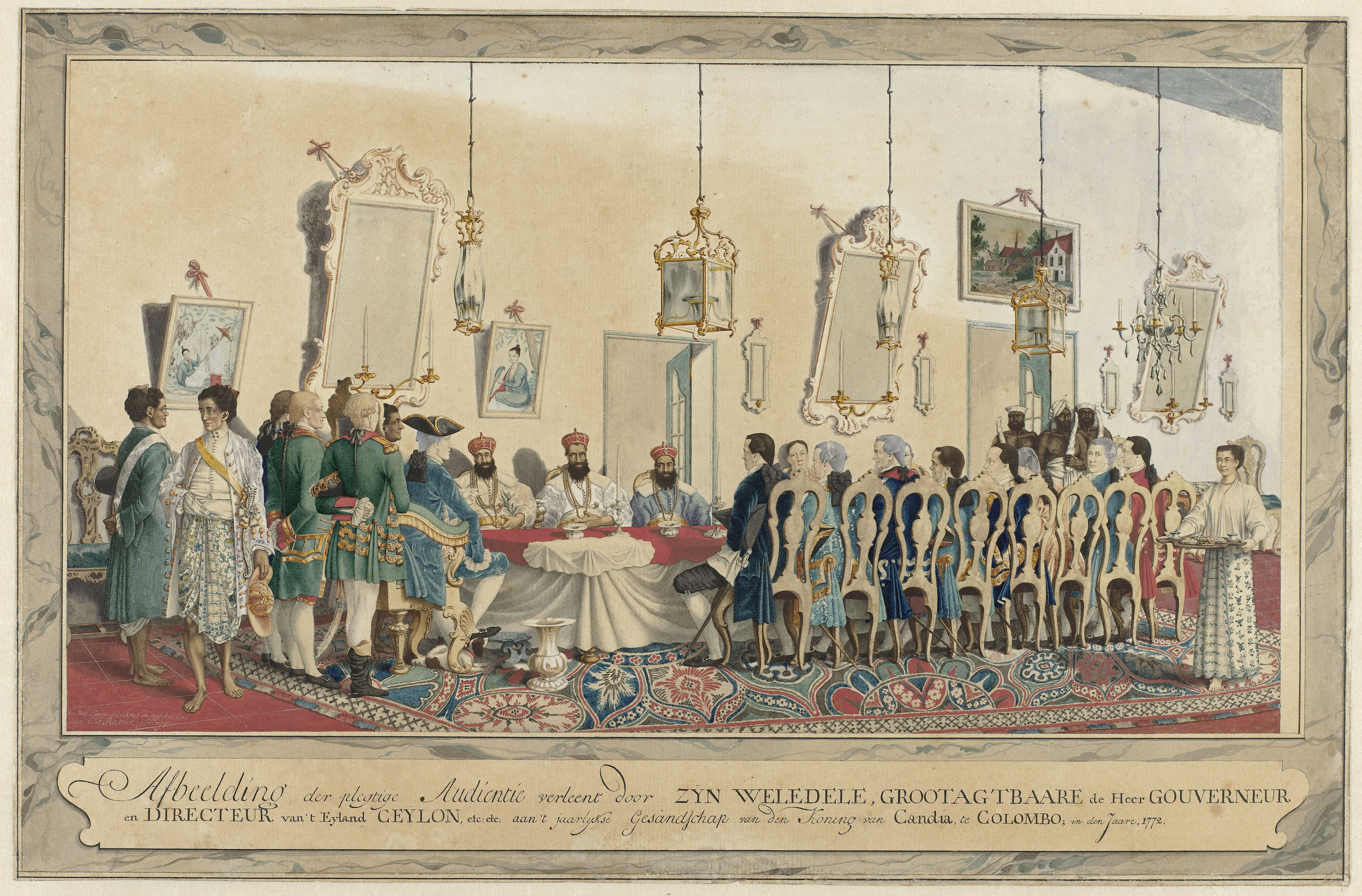
Reception of the envoys of the king of Kandy by governor Imam Falck

The Rijksmuseum is a watercolor by Carel Frederik Reymer 18th century an official meeting in 1772 between Iman Falck and an embassy from Kandy. Venue is the reception hall of the government building in Colombo. Dr. RL Brohier in his book Changing Face of Colombo describe the reception:

"The Hall is lavishly decorated with rich carpets, lamps and candelabras, paintings large and small, mirrors with gilded frames, giving us a glimpse of the style in-which the Dutch Governors of Ceylon lived. Falk, the Governor and head of the Council is seated on Heavily wrought a wooden chair or a special shape. The three Envoys from Kandy -Maha Mohottiyar Dodanvala Ralahamy and Muhandirams Iniyagama Ralahamy and Mideniya Ralahamy are shown with optional legged straight combs in Their Hair. The silver spit afternoons, one beside the Dutch Governor and the others on the table indicate That the custom of chewing betel was Widely accepted by the Dutch in Ceylon. In some cases the Europeans also partook in this activity and found quids of betel pleasant and enjoyable. It is quite evident from this painting of the Reception Hall of the Dutch Governor's Residence That Hardly any vestiges of the Dutch Colonial style of architecture or decoration survived after the British converted the House to a church. "

== Notes ==
Government offices
Preceded by Anthony Mooyart as acting governor	Governor of Zeylan; 1765-1785	Succeeded by Edward Hughes
