= Rijckloff van Goens =

Dutch governor

Rijcklof Volckertsz. van Goens
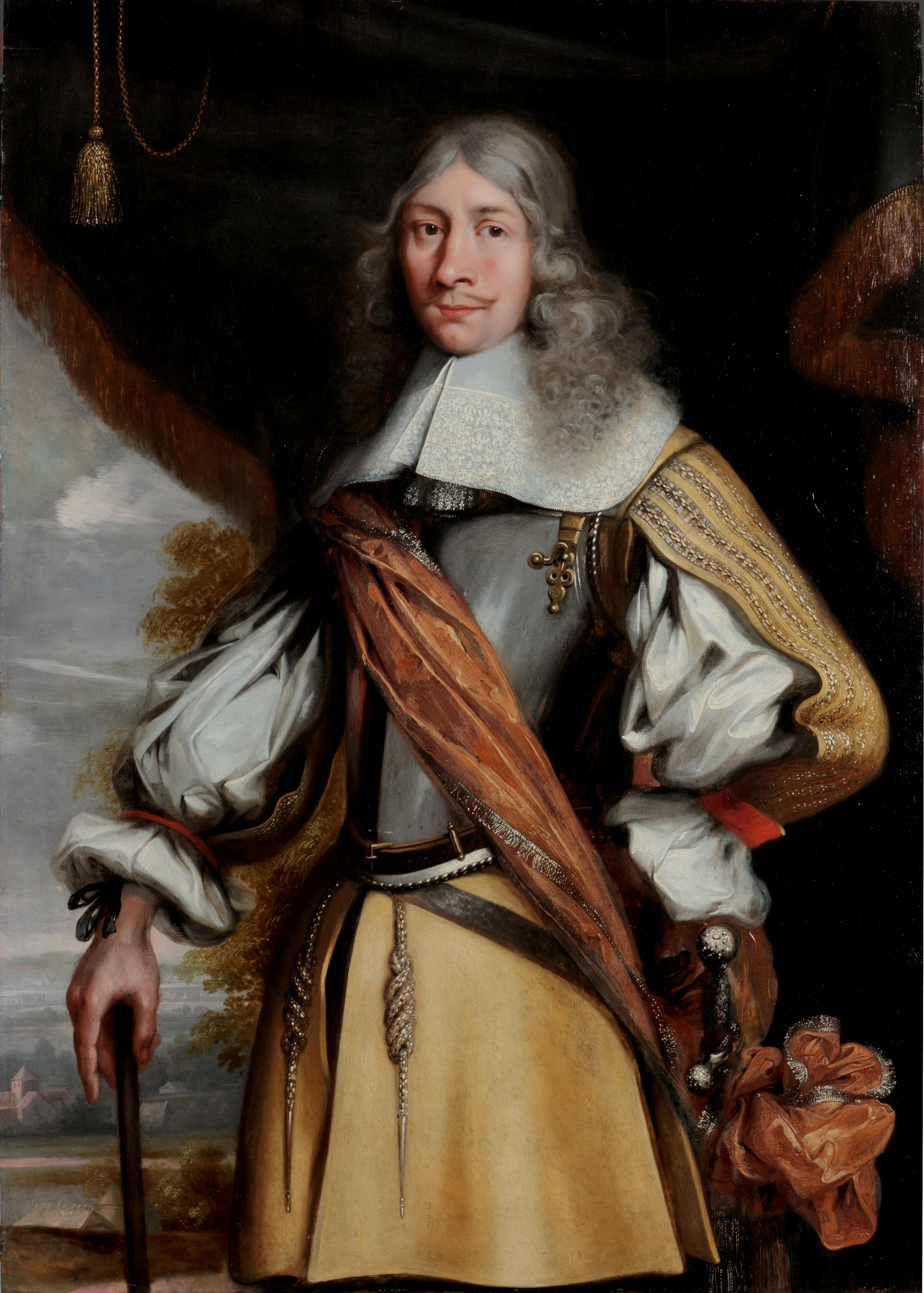
- Portrait by Jürgen Ovens

Governor of Dutch Ceylon
- In office 12 May 1660 – 1661
- Preceded by: Adriaan van der Meyden
- Succeeded by: Adriaan van der Meyden
- In office 1663–1663
- Preceded by: Adriaan van der Meyden
- Succeeded by: Jacob Hustaert
- In office 19 November 1664 – 1675
- Preceded by: Jacob Hustaert
- Succeeded by: Ryklof van Goens de jonge

Governor-General of the Dutch East Indies
- In office 4 January 1678 – 25 November 1681
- Preceded by: Joan Maetsuycker
- Succeeded by: Cornelis Speelman

Personal details
- Born: 24 June 1619 Rees
- Died: 14 November 1682 (aged 63) Amsterdam, Dutch Republic

Military service
- Allegiance: Dutch East India Company
- Battles/wars: Dutch-Portuguese War; Action of 2 May 1654; Conquest of Negapattinam; Siege of Nagapatnam (1658); Battle of Mannar (1658); Siege of Jaffna (1658); Dutch conquest of Malabar (1658-1663); Siege of Cochin (1663); Further conquests of Portuguese footholds in Asia; Dutch-Zamorin Conflicts; 1666-1668 conflict; 1670-1672 conflict; Franco-Dutch War; Third Anglo-Dutch War; Battle of Masulipatnam; Siege of São Tomé (1673); Kandyan-Dutch War (1670-1675); Siege of Trincomalee (1673)

Rijcklof Volckertsz. van Goens (24 June 1619 – 14 November 1682) was the Governor of Zeylan and Governor-General of the Dutch East Indies. He was the Governor of Zeylan from 12 May 1660 to 1661, then in 1663 and finally from 19 November 1664 to 1675 during the Dutch period in Ceylon. He was also served as Council Member of India during 1679. Van Goens’ managed to monopolize the cinnamon trade, get hold of the Malabar pepper and drive away the Portuguese from Ceylon and the Coromandel Coast for the VOC.

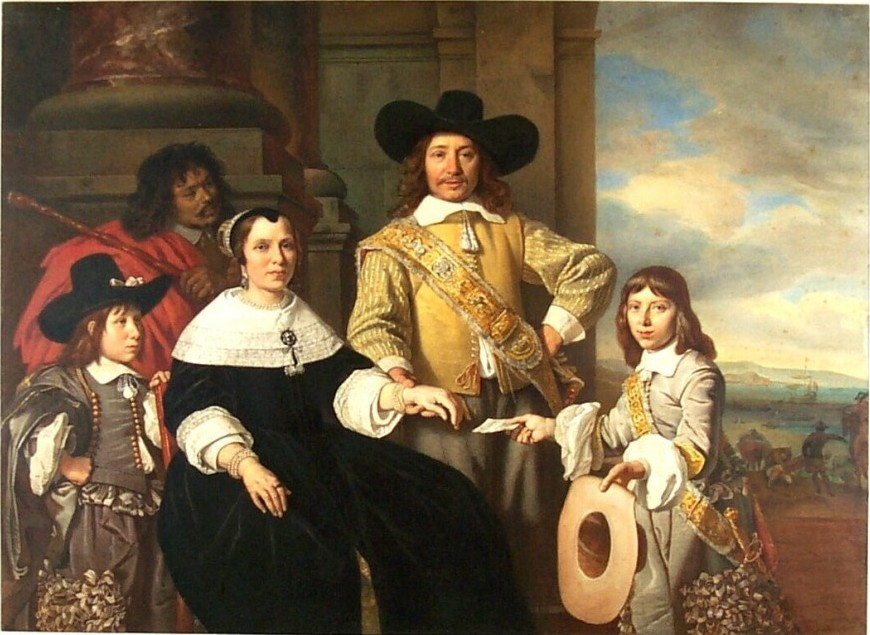
Rijckloff van Goens and his family

Van Goens was born in Rees. He wrote extensively about his travels to Java, Ceylon and India. His writing about visits to the palaces of Sultan Agung and his successors are important references for historians of the Mataram era in Java. He died in Amsterdam, aged 63.

On 20 February 1673, Van Goens with a fleet of 6,000 men attacked Bombay. Soon, The Treaty of Westminster concluded between England and the Netherlands in 1674, relieved the East India Company settlements in Bombay of further apprehension from the Dutch. In 1679 when Rijckloff van Goens arrived at Cape Town, while recuperating from an illness. He recommended to the Chamber of Seventeen, the governing body of the Dutch East India Company (VOC), that land should be granted to Simon van der Stel. When Simon van der Stel received title to 891 morgen (about 763 hectares) on 13 July 1685, he built a house and used the land to produce wine and called the estate as Groot Constantia where Groot in Dutch is great and Constantia is daughter's name of Rijckloff van Goens.

== Campaigns against the Portuguese ==
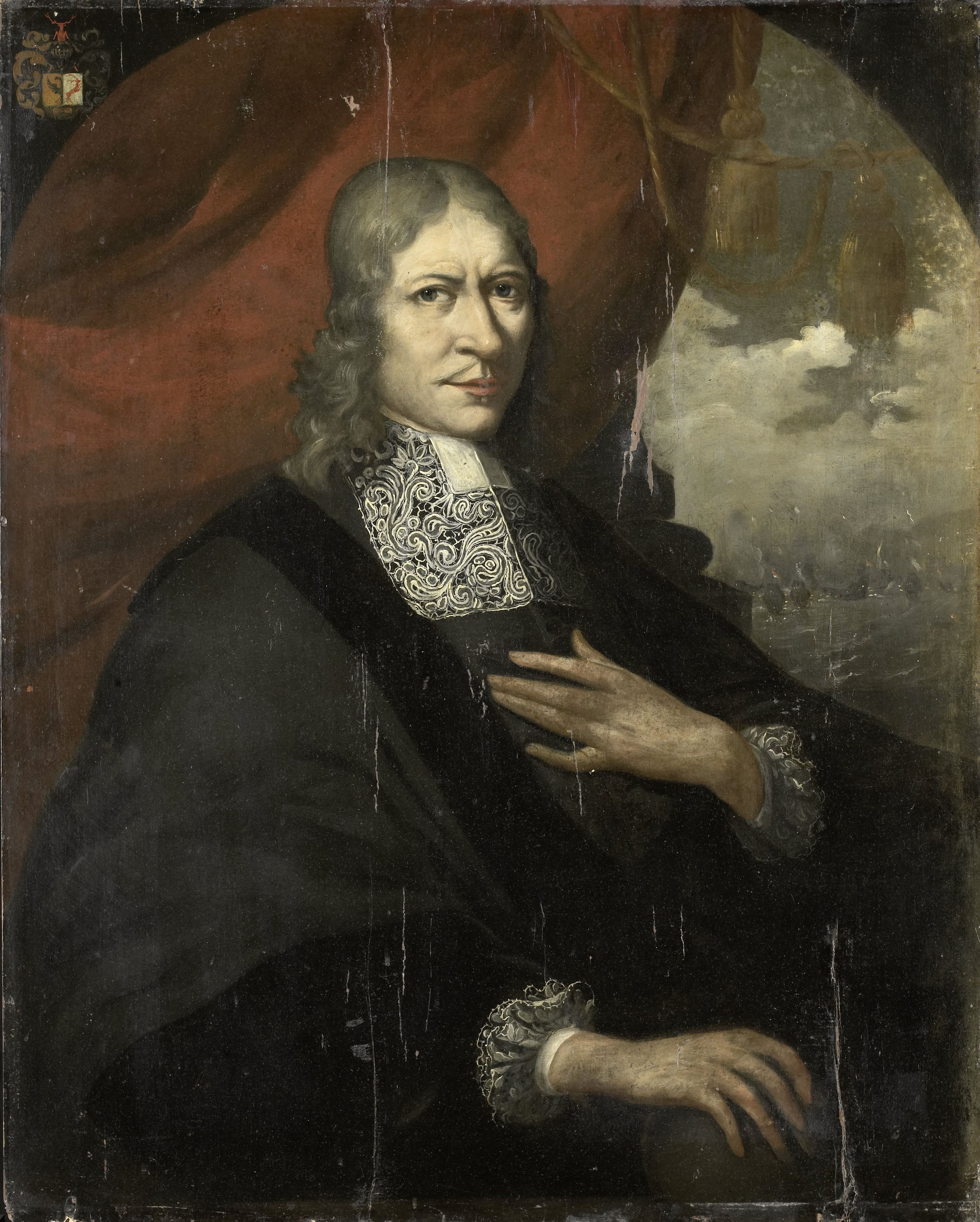

Van Goens had been leading many of the successful military campaigns directed at the Portuguese. Van Goens, was of the belief that everybody else, but especially Muslim traders, England and Portugal, were jealous of the company's possessions. He believed that the company should strike before its enemies would strike, which naturally would lead to a further increase of the company's possessions. The VOC was, first and foremost, a trading company. Therefore, officials back in the Netherlands were reluctant to send reinforcements over to Asia. Nevertheless, van Goens was able to successfully convince the majority of the officials to send a massive fleet to Asia, with the goal of taking Ceylon, Cochin, Diu, Goa, Mozambique and Macao from the Portuguese. Van Goens was able to conquer Jaffanapatnam, Mannar and the stronghold of Tuticorin on the Coromandel Coast by 23 June 1658. He did this with 21 ships, carrying a total of 2139 soldiers, 1550 sailors, 240 Singhalese soldiers and 180 saves. The soldiers themselves saw little action as the towns surrendered. In 1661, when a peace treaty was signed between Portugal and the Republic, the plan that van Goens so carefully planned a few years before, appeared to be a failure as the Portuguese's fortresses were stronger than van Goens had anticipated. Nevertheless, the Portuguese were expulsed from Ceylon and the Coromandel Coast. Macao, Diu, Goa, Cochin and Mozambique were still in Portuguese hands. Formosa had been lost as well. Two years later, van Goens conquered Cochin. After a hard battle, the Portuguese commander Sermento negotiated a surrender on 7 January 1663.

== See also ==
- Dutch East India Company
- Governor-General of the Dutch East Indies

== Bibliography ==
- Blussé, Leonard, "De Chinese nachtmerrie: een terugtocht en twee nederlagen" in: De voc: tussen oorlog en diplomatie, Leiden: Oxford University press, 2002.
- Femme Gaastra, The Dutch East India Company: expansion and decline. Zutphen: Walburg Pers, 2003.
- Bruijn, J. R., Femme Gaastra, and I. Schöffer, eds., Dutch-Asiatic shipping in the 17th and 18th centuries. Rijks geschiedkundige publicatiën. Grote serie, vol. 165–167. (The Hague: Nijhoff, 1979, 1987).
- Meilink-Roelofsz, M. A. P., "Hoe rationeel was de organisatie van de Nederlandse Oost-Indische Compagnie?", Economisch en sociaal-historisch jaarboek 44 (1982) 170–190.
- Tristan Mostert, Chain of command: The military system of the Dutch East India Company 1655–1663, University of Leiden, 2007.
