= Governor of Ceylon =

The governor of Ceylon can refer to historical vice-regal representatives of three colonial powers:

== Portuguese Ceylon ==
- List of captains of Portuguese Ceylon (1518–1551)
- List of captain-majors of Portuguese Ceylon (1551–1594)
- List of governors of Portuguese Ceylon (1594–1658)

== Dutch Ceylon ==
- List of governors of Dutch Ceylon (1640–1796)

== British Ceylon ==
- Governor of British Ceylon (1798–1948)

== Dominion of Ceylon ==
- Governor-General of Ceylon (1948–1972)
