= Demons of Sri Lanka =

Part of Sinhalese folklore

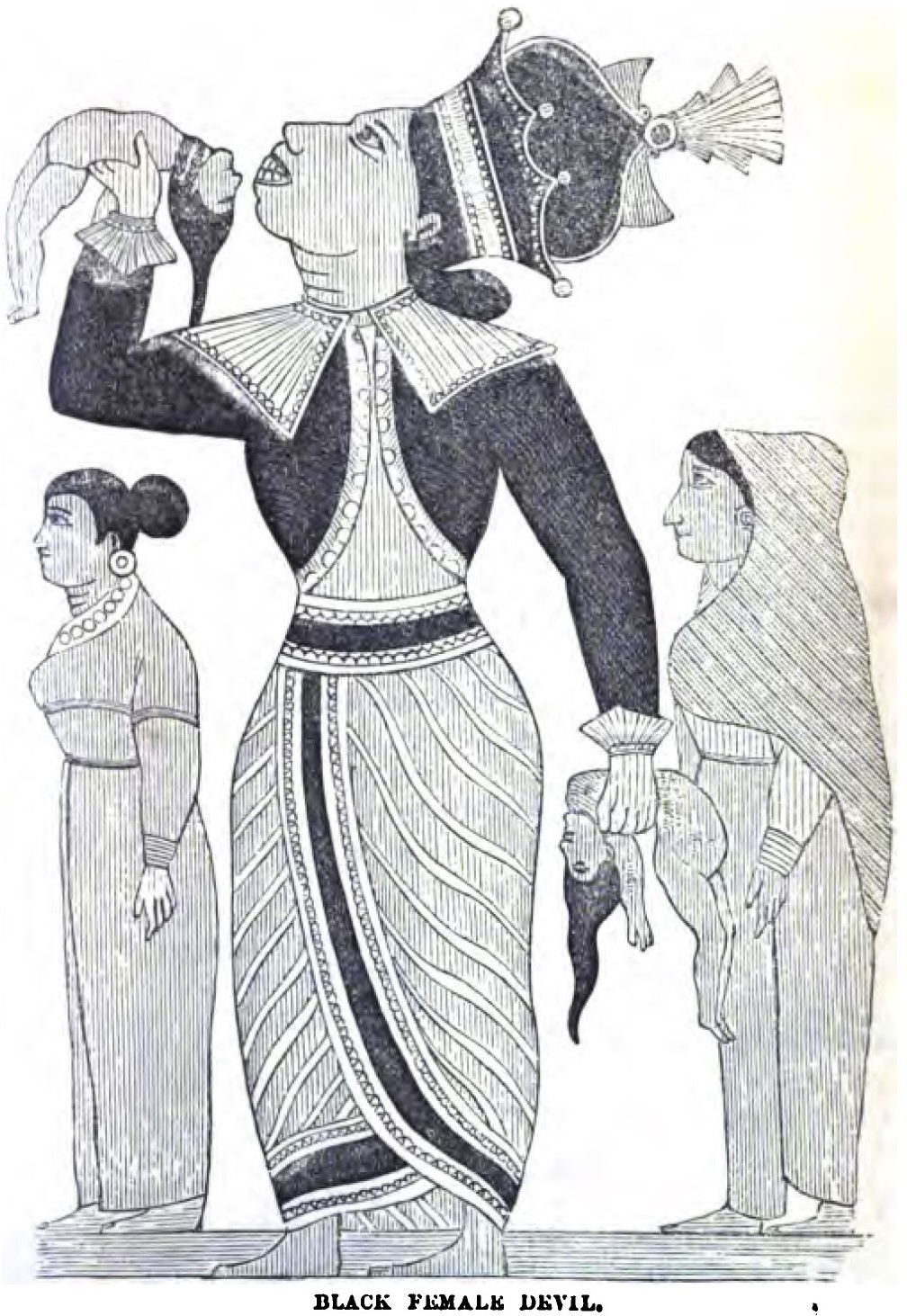
Black Female Devil (1852)

Demons, more commonly known by their Sinhala names yakshaya and yaka (Sinhala: යක්ෂයා/යකා), form an important part of Sinhalese folklore in Sri Lanka. They are under the rule of a king, who has forbidden them to kill humans. Therefore they bring down various diseases upon humans, so that they can gain the satisfaction that they are denied because of this ban. Victims who are believed to have been affected by demons then have to be cured and the demons repelled through exorcism rituals.

== Origins ==
Demons are believed to spring into existence, fully grown (known as opapatika in the Pali language) rather than being given birth by a mother. However, some demons, like the Kola Sanni Yaka have been born to human parents and later become demons. Another demon that was born in an unusual way is the Maha Sohona, who had been revived by a god after being killed, but returned from the dead as a demon.

== Demon community ==
The demons form a large community, and are led by a king named Wesamuni (also referred to as Wessamony in some sources). Wesamuni is feared by all the demons and he rules them with an iron fist. Any wrongdoing is punished severely, often by death. There are 32 torturous punishments he can hand out, including boiling, roasting, impaling, and pouring molten metal down the offender's throat. King Wesamuny has a magical golden sword which can fly out of his hand, behead a thousand "with the rapidity of lightning" and return to his hand again, all of its own accord.

The demons were once independent and freely attacked humans and ate them. However, Wesamuni has since forbidden them to attack humans directly, and they are allowed only to afflict diseases and suffering. This is believed to earn the demons a satisfaction similar to that of killing humans. One of the most notorious and feared demons is the Reeri Yakseya, who is believed to be capable of inflicting every kind of disease.

There are two types of demons. The first are closer to the status of gods or deities, and live in the upper regions of the sky in large and elaborate palaces. These dewatawas are believed to be wise and powerful and not harmful to humans. The second type of demons also live in the sky, but closer to the surface of the Earth. They are cruel and savage, revelling in human misery, and are feared by the Sinhalese. They are invisible to the human eye, but most are considered to be black-skinned and have long white teeth.

== Yaksa Sabawa (The Council of Demons) ==
On every Wednesday and Saturday, all the demons assemble together. This assembly is called the "Yaksa Sabawa". At this assembly, each chieftain has to give an account to mahasen about the activities and conduct of his subjects. After this is done, all the demons engage in merry-making, and also display their various skills.

== Exorcism ==
Traditional exorcism rituals such as the Sanni Yakuma are held to ward off demons when a person is believed to have been affected by them. These rituals are closely connected with the Pahatharata dancing form. The exorcism rituals, which are often long and elaborate, involve performances with dancers dressed as various demons accompanied by drums. Offerings are presented to the demon, in exchange for which the demon agrees to leave the victim.
