= Devol (deity) =

Devol (also spelled as Dewol) is a deity subjected to worship and belief in Sri Lanka. He is one of the twelve deities worshiped in Sri Lanka as "Dolos Deviyo" (twelve gods), who are believed to be intervening in the affairs of the worldlings. The practice of the worship of Devol deviyo or the cult of Devol is widespread among the Sinhalese, specially in the Galle District, South western lowlands and coastal areas of the country.

Devotees who make offerings at the shrines and perform rituals usually seek vengeance, benevolence and prosperity from the deity to solve their day to day problems. The Seenigama shrine consecrated to God Devol, on the Galle - Colombo main road located in close proximity to the Hikkaduwa town has become a popular destination of the devotees as well as the local and foreign tourists who visit Hikkaduwa area.

== Major shrines ==
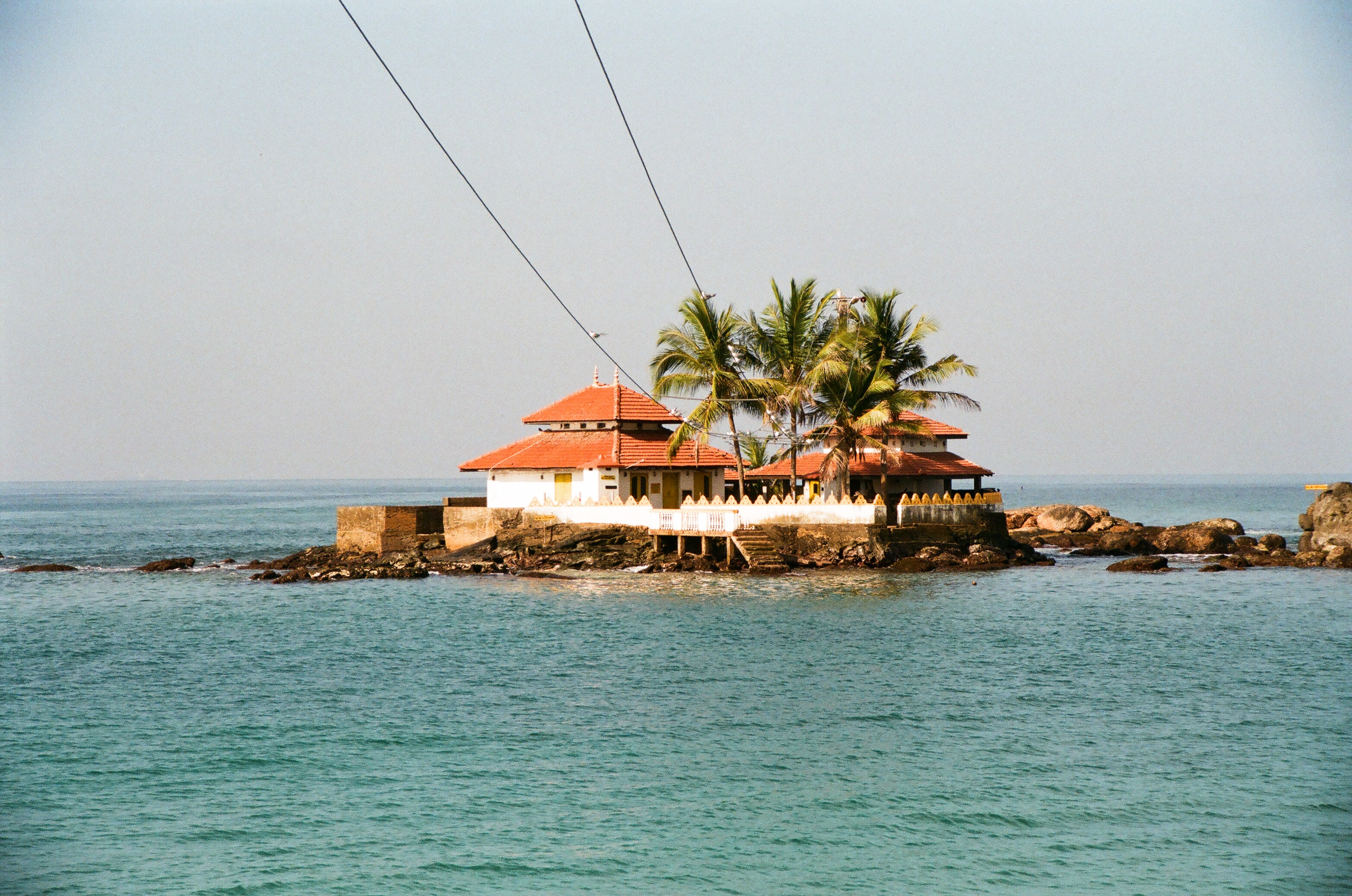
Seenigama devalaya, a shrine consecrated to God Devol, located in a small island in Hikkaduwa, Sri Lanka.

Seenigama Devalaya, situated in Seenigama, Hikkaduwa is a popular shrine dedicated to Devol deviyo, which is the destination of people who comes to make offerings to the deity. Seenigama Devalaya consists of two shrines, a shrine located in the mainland at the entrance and an ancient shrine which located in a small island that is separated from main land by the coastal waters.

Another major shrine dedicated to the deity, known as Welle devalaya (Shrine of the beach) is situated in Unawatuna, Galle. An annual Esala festival is held for several days with the attendance of thousands of devotees at the Unawatuna Wella devalaya in the month of July/ August

There is another devalaya down in Weragoda, close to Ginthota where the baton of the 'Devol deviyo' is believed to be buried.

- Seenigama devalaya, Seenigama, Hikkaduwa
- Wella devalaya, Unawatuna
- Weragoda devalaya, Ginthota

== Devol Maduwa ==
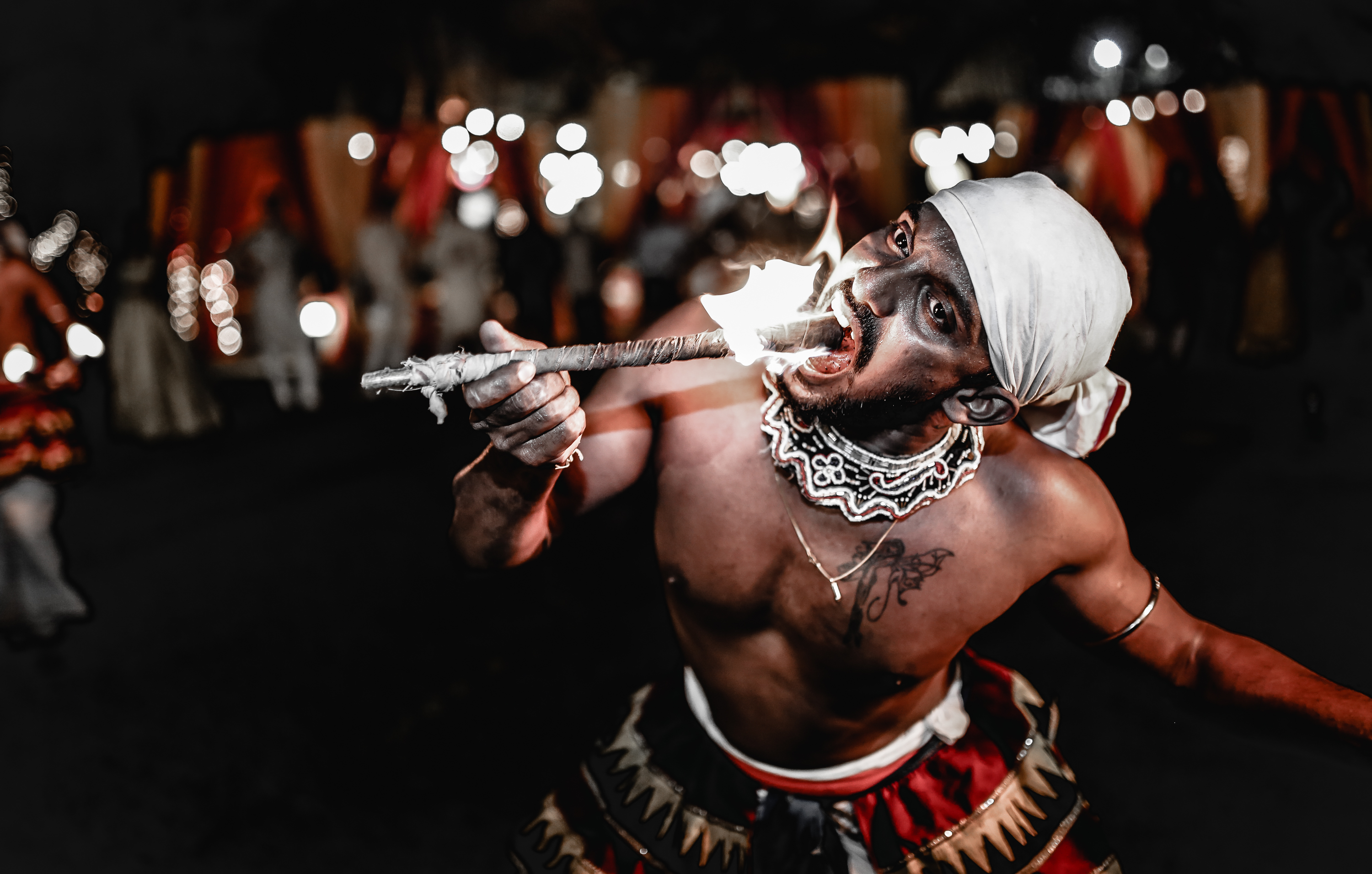
Devol Maduwa

Devol Maduwa or Devol Madu is a traditional low country Sinhalese dance that is practiced to propitiate Devol deity. This ritual is performed by the villagers to re-enact the arrival of Devol deity to Sri Lanka. By performing this ritual villagers expect good luck, expelling evil spirits and protection from epidemics.

== See also ==
- Culture of Sri Lanka
