= Sanni Yakuma =

Sinhalese exorcism ritual

Sanni yakuma, sometimes known as Daha ata sanniyas, is a traditional Sinhalese exorcism ritual. The ritual consists of 18 masked dances, each depicting a particular illness or ailment affecting humans. These 18 dances are the main dances of the Pahatharata, country, dancing form, which is one of the three main dancing forms of Sri Lanka. The ritual calls the demons who are thought to affect the patient, who are then told not to trouble humans and banished.

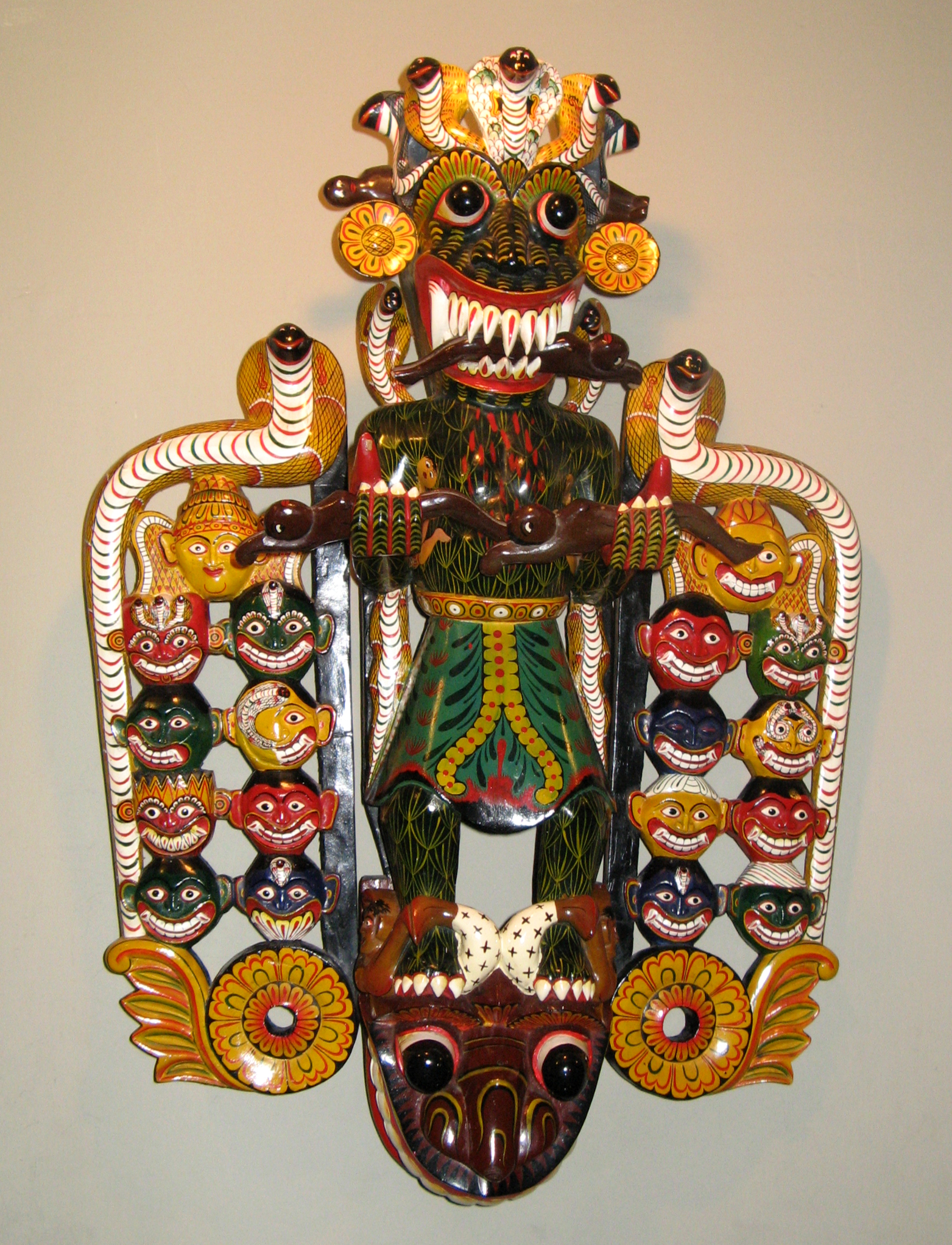
Maha Kola mask

== Origins ==
It was believed that illnesses were brought on humans by demons and these beliefs and rituals could have prehistoric roots. According to folklore, the 18 demons who are depicted in the Sanni Yakuma originated during the time of the Buddha. (Note: However, this story is given differently in Buddhist sources, and describes the Buddha saving the city from a plague through the chanting of the Ratana Sutta. See Vaishali_(ancient_city)#Visits_of_the_Buddha_to_Vaishali.) The story goes that the king of Licchavis of Vaishali suspected his queen of committing adultery and had her killed. However, she gave birth when she was executed and her child became the Kola Sanniya, who grew up "feeding on his mother's corpse". The Kola Sanni demon destroyed the city, seeking vengeance on his father, the king. He created eighteen lumps of poison and charmed them, thereby turning them into demons who assisted him in his destruction of the city. They killed the king, and continued to wreak havoc in the city, "killing and eating thousands" daily, until finally being tamed by the Buddha and agreed to stop harming humans.

Each of these demons are believed to affect humans in the form of an illnesses, and the Sanni Yakuma ritual summons these demons and banishes them back to the demon world after bringing them under control. Although it is unclear when the ritual began, it has been performed in the southern and western parts of the country since ancient times.

== Ritual ==
The name of the ritual comes from the Sinhala word sanniya meaning disease or ailment, and yakuma meaning demon ritual. In Sri Lankan culture, exorcism rituals are known as tovil. The Sanni Yakuma is possibly the best known exorcism ritual in the country. It is a mix of traditional beliefs regarding spirits with Buddhism. Before performing the healing ritual, the lead performer known as the yakadura determines whether the patient is affected by a demon, and schedules the ritual for an auspicious day and time, usually from dusk to dawn. The Edura or Yakadura is the Shaman healer and is usually a fisherman, drummer or farmer. It has two main stages, namely the Ata Paliya and Daha Ata Sanniya. The dancers are dressed in colourful attire and masks, and perform swift and complex dance steps and spins accompanied by rhythmical drum beats. Rather comic and somewhat obscene dialogues take place between the drummer and the demon on stage, in which the demon is humiliated. For example, Moore and Myerhoff (1977) describe the following dialogue translated from Sinhala:

Drummer: Where are you off to?
Demon: I am off to Maradana by a first class express bus.
Drummer: ...What was it I saw you doing only yesterday? You pissed near the sacred bodhi tree, then shat on the temple grounds after which you stole a monk's robes. What else have you done? ...
Demon: You peretaya! (Note: Peretaya refers to preta, and is used here as an abusive term.)
Drummer: Aah – you are only a mad demon – beneath contempt.

=== Ata Paliya ===
Ata Paliya is the name given to the eight dances in the first stage of the ritual. Before the dances begin, the Yakadura prepares some offerings for the demons, which will be given to them by the patient. The Ata Paliya depicts eight palis who bless the patient. This includes the Suniyan Yakshaniya who appears thrice as a beautiful damsel, a pregnant woman and a woman carrying a baby. This is followed by Maruwa (death) and demons called Kalu Yaka, Vatha Kumara and Kalu Kumara. The other palis are known as Anguru Dummala Paliya, Kalaspaliya and Salupaliya.

Suniyan Yakshaniya	A demigoddess, 3 time as; a beautiful damsel a pregnant woman a woman carrying a baby
Maruwa	death
Kalu Yaka	black Demon
Vatha Kumara	apparition for rheumatism
Kalu Kumara	Black prince (a demon)
Anguru Dummala Paliya	charcoal apparition
Kalaspaliya	pot-bearing apparition
Salupaliya	Shawl apparition blessings of goddess Pattini

=== Daha Ata Sanniya ===
Although the Daha Ata Sanniya is part of the Sanni Yakuma, the name is sometimes used to refer to the ritual itself. This is the stage when the sanni demons make their appearance one after the other. The demons who first appear frightening when they enter the stage in frenzied dances are then shown as comic figures through enactments, with them being humiliated and forced to do various things. The Kola Sanni demon enters last, who is depicted as a non Buddhist demon. In the end, he is made to obtain the permission of the Buddha and accept offerings from humans, and agrees to stop troubling them. In the end, the dancer appears before the patient after removing the mask.

Although there are only eighteen demons, there is a variety of sanni masks that differ from place to place. However, the eighteen most commons masks (and names of the demons) are as follows:

Demon	Associated ailment	Used Mask
Amukku Sanniya	Vomiting and stomach diseases	
Abutha Sanniya	Non–spirit related insanity	
Butha Sanniya	Spirit related insanity	
Bihiri Sanniya	Deafness	
Deva Sanniya	Epidemic diseases	
Gedi Sanniya	Boils and skin diseases	
Gini Jala Sanniya	Malaria and other high fevers	
Golu Sanniya	Dumbness	
Gulma Sanniya	Parasitic worms and stomach diseases	
Jala Sanniya	Cholera and chills	
Kana Sanniya	Blindness	
Kora Sanniya	Lameness and paralysis	
Maru Sanniya	Delirium and death	
Naga Sanniya	Bad dreams about snakes	
Pissu Sanniya	Temporary insanity	
Pith Sanniya	Bilious diseases	
Slesma Sanniya	Phlegm and epilepsy	
Vatha Sanniya	Flatulence and rheumatism	

== Current status ==
The Sanni Yakuma is still performed today, particularly along the south coast, though more often as a cultural spectacle than an exorcism ritual. However, it is not widely performed because of the high costs involved and also because of its long duration. The 2004 Indian Ocean earthquake and tsunami also has affected its survival. Though the coastal regions came under colonial influences as well as prior foreign influences, the art was best preserved in the south-west coast.

== Notes ==
sinhala
