= Seenigama =

- Village
- Location within Sri Lanka
- Coordinates: 6.156747°N 80.092483°E
- Country: Sri Lanka
- Province: Southern
- District: Galle
- Provincial capital: Galle

Seenigama or Seenigama Devol is a village on the south coast of Sri Lanka. It is located in the Southern Province, about 22 kilometres (14 mi) north-west of Galle. Seenigama is known for a temple dedicated to Devol, a deity in Sinhala Buddhist mythology.
