= Culture of Sri Lanka =

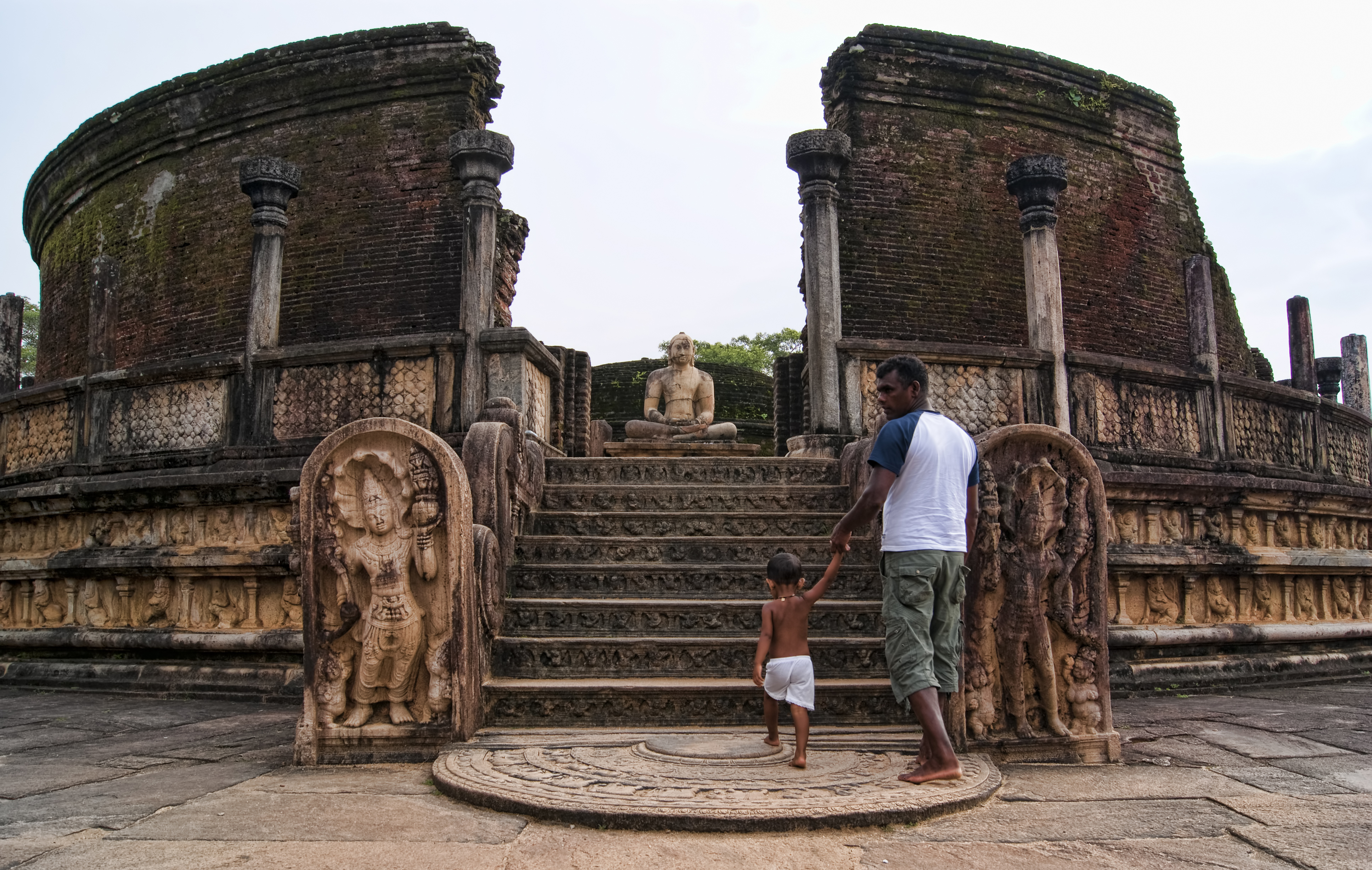
Polonnaruwa Vatadage Sri Lanka

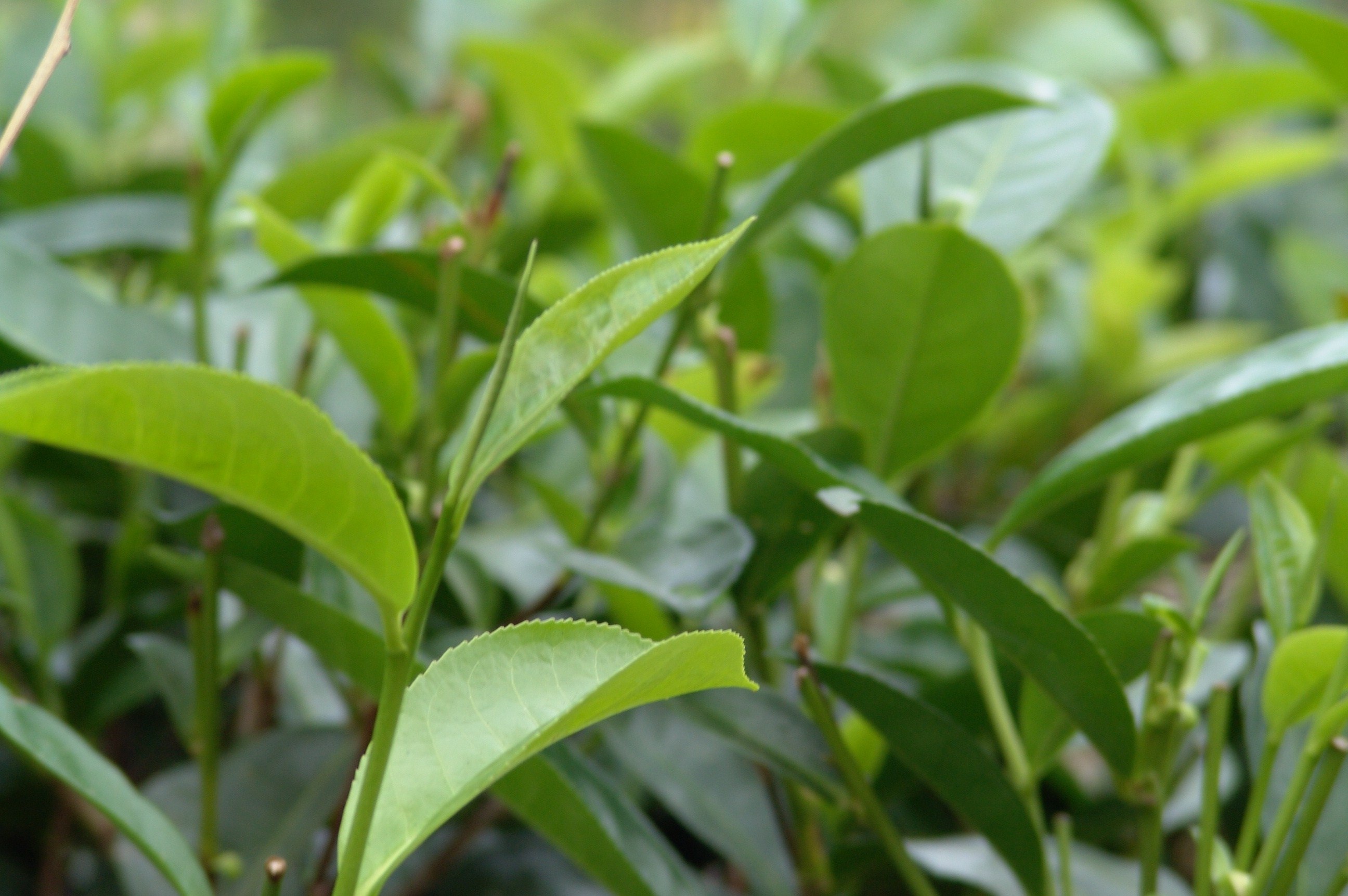
Ceylon tea

The culture of Sri Lanka mixes modern elements with traditional aspects and is known for its regional diversity. Sri Lankan culture has long been influenced by the heritage of Theravada Buddhism and the religion's legacy is particularly strong in Sri Lanka below the northern region. South Indian cultural influences are especially pronounced in the northernmost reaches of the country. The history of colonial occupation has also left a mark on Sri Lanka's identity, with Portuguese, Dutch, and British elements having intermingled with various traditional facets of Sri Lankan culture. Culturally, Sri Lanka possesses strong links to both India and Southeast Asia. For over 5000 years, India and Sri Lanka have nurtured a legacy of historical, cultural, religious, spiritual, and linguistic connections.

The country has a rich artistic tradition, with distinct creative forms that encompass music, dance, and the visual arts. Sri Lankan culture is internationally associated with cricket, a distinct cuisine, an indigenous holistic medicine practice, religious iconography such as the Buddhist flag, and exports such as tea, cinnamon, and gemstones, as well as a robust tourism industry. Sri Lanka has longstanding ties with the Indian subcontinent that can be traced back to prehistory. Sri Lanka's population is predominantly Sinhalese with sizable Sri Lankan Tamil, Sri Lankan Muslim, Indian Tamil, Sri Lankan Malay and Burgher minorities.

== History ==
Sri Lanka was first inhabited by Homo sapiens who traversed the Indian Ocean about 125,000 years ago. Sri Lanka has a documented history of over 3,000 years, mainly due to ancient historic scriptures like Mahawamsa, and with the first stone objects dating back to 500,000 BCE. Several centuries of intermittent foreign influence has transformed Sri Lankan culture to its present form. Nevertheless, the ancient traditions and festivals are still celebrated on the island, together with other minorities that make up the Sri Lankan identity.

One very important aspect that differentiates Sri Lankan history is its view on women. Women and men in Sri Lanka have been viewed equal for thousands of years from ruling the country to how they dress. Both men and women had the chance to rule the land, which is true even in the modern day. The world's first female prime minister, Sirimavo Bandaranaike, was from Sri Lanka.

Even though clothing today is very much westernized and modest dressing has become the norm for everyone, ancient drawings and carvings such as 'Sigiriya art's, Isurumuniya Lovers show how the pre-colonial Sri Lankans used to dress, which shows identical amount of clothing and status for men and women.

== Visual arts ==
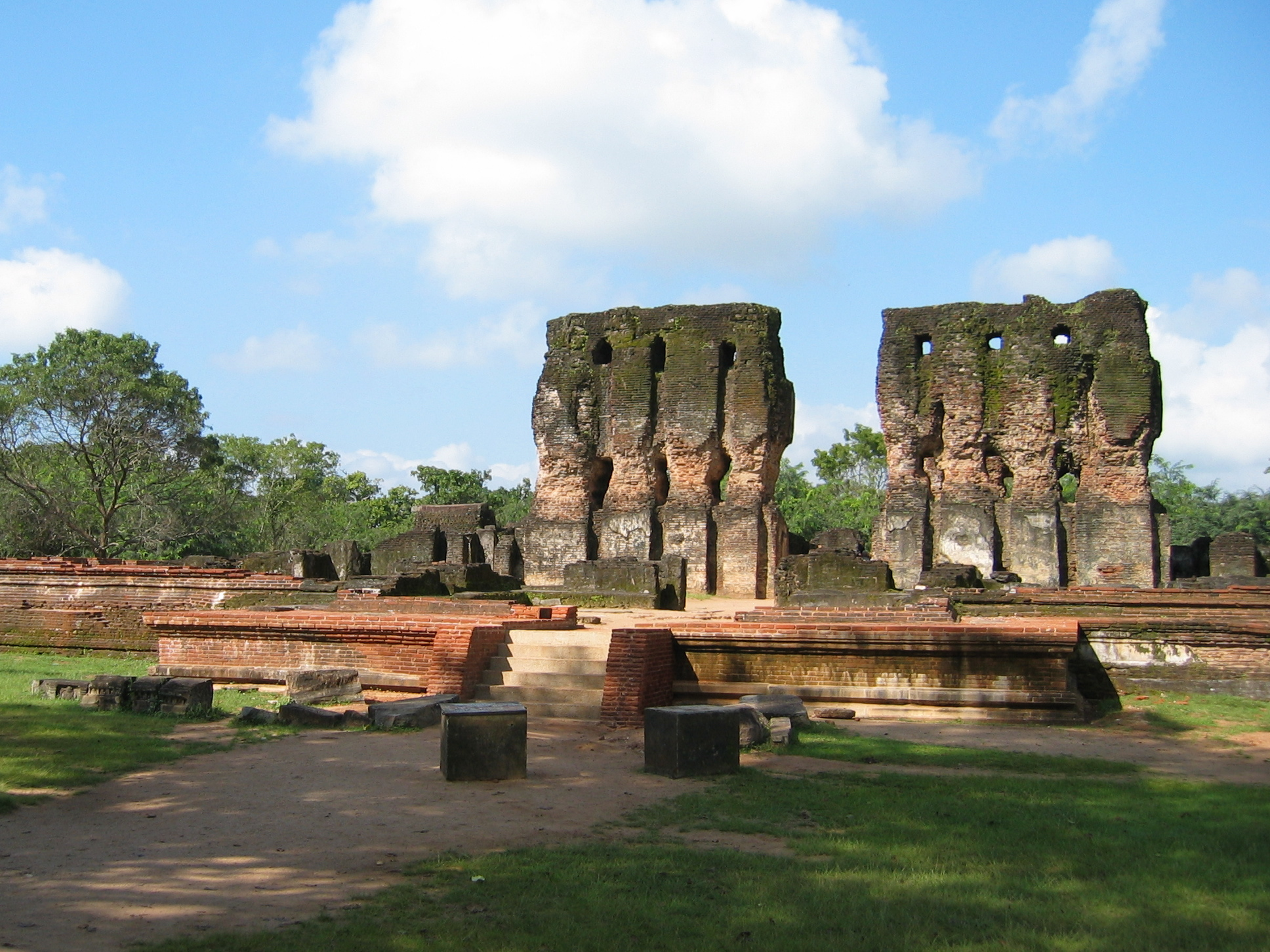
A royal palace in Polonnaruwa

=== Architecture ===
The architecture of Sri Lanka displays a rich variety of architectural forms and styles. Buddhism had a significant influence on Sri Lankan architecture, since it was introduced to the island in 3rd Century BCE. Techniques and styles developed in India, China and later Europe, transported via colonialism, have also played a major role in the architecture of Sri Lanka.

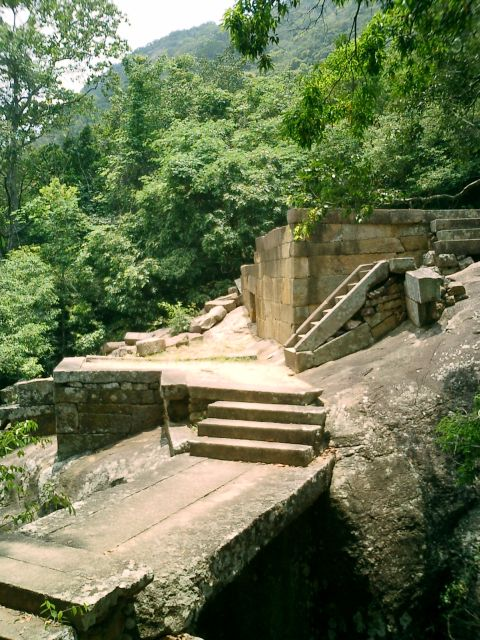
Ritigala

=== Arts and crafts ===
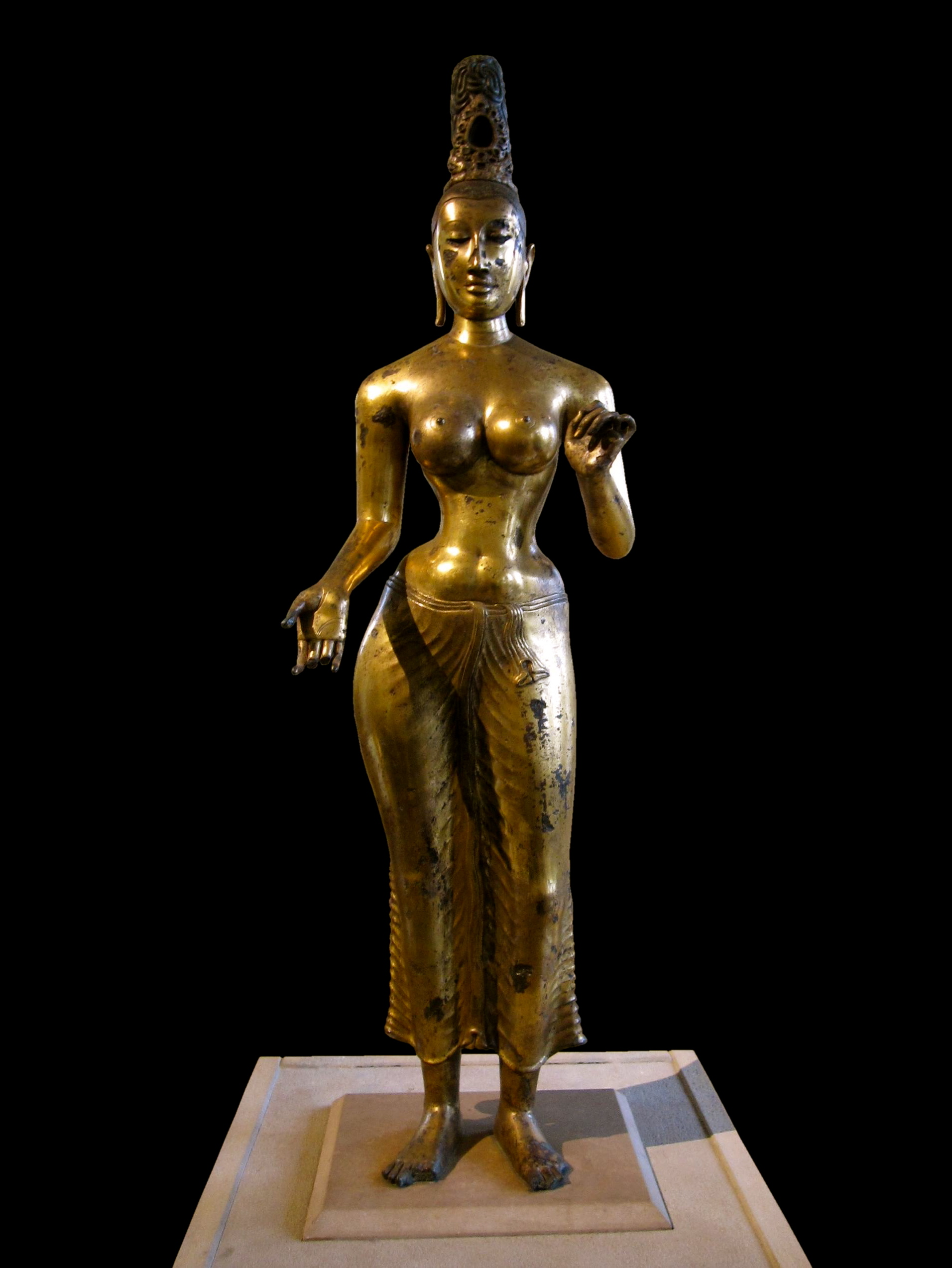
Gilded bronze statue of the Bodhisattva Tara, from the Anuradhapura period, 8th century

Many forms of Sri Lankan arts and crafts take inspiration from the Island's long and lasting Buddhist culture which in turn has absorbed and adopted countless regional and local traditions. In most instances Sri Lankan art originates from religious beliefs, and is represented in many forms such as painting, sculpture, and architecture. One of the most notable aspects of Sri Lankan art are caves and temple paintings, such as the frescoes found at Sigiriya, and religious paintings found in temples in Dambulla and Temple of the Tooth Relic in Kandy. Other popular forms of art have been influenced by both natives as well as foreign settlers. For example, traditional wooden handicrafts and clay pottery are found around the hilly regions while Portuguese-inspired lacework and Indonesian-inspired Batik are also notable.

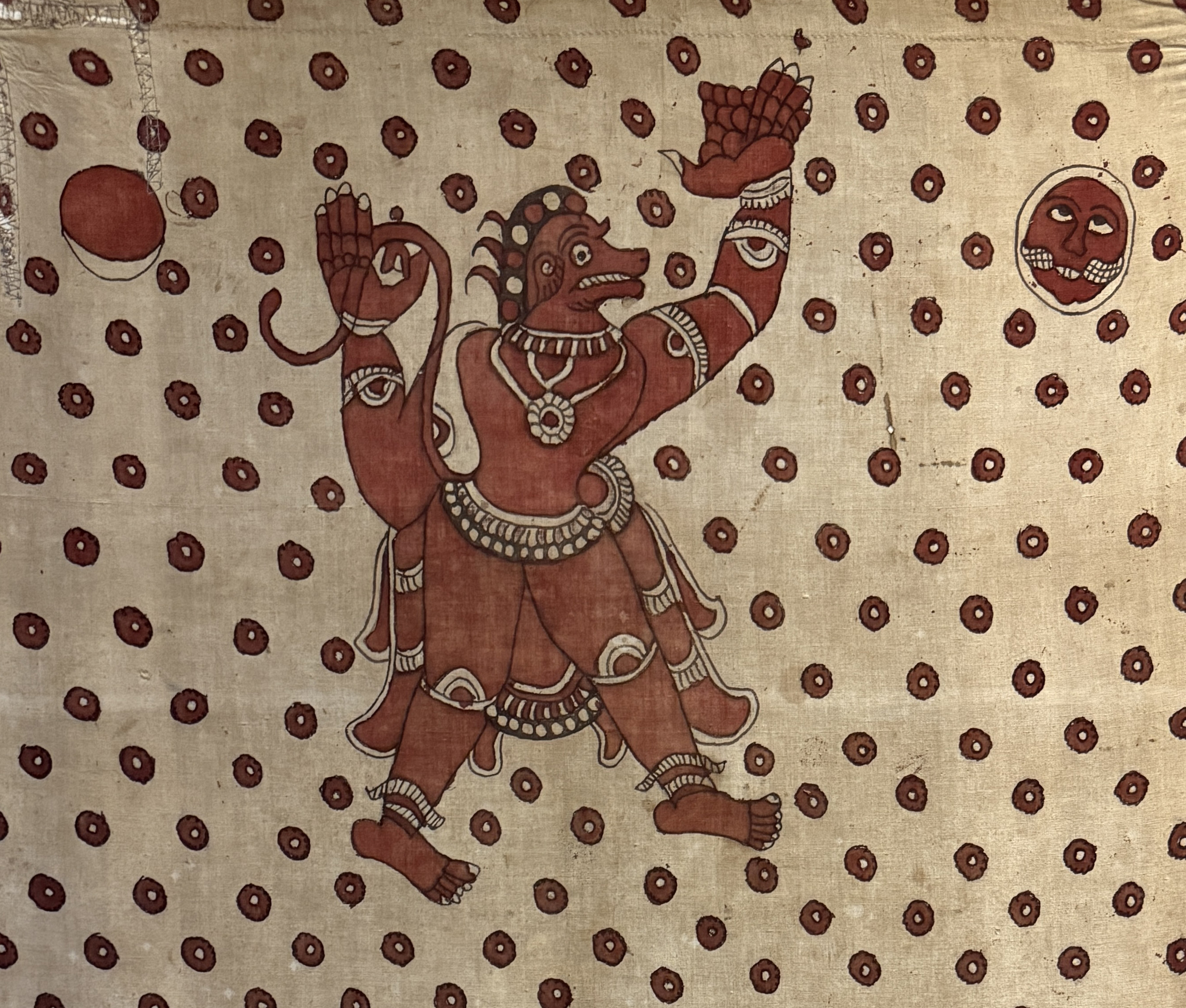
Ancient Ceremonial Temple or Clan Flag from Sri Lanka. Courtesy of the Wovensouls Collection

== Performing arts ==
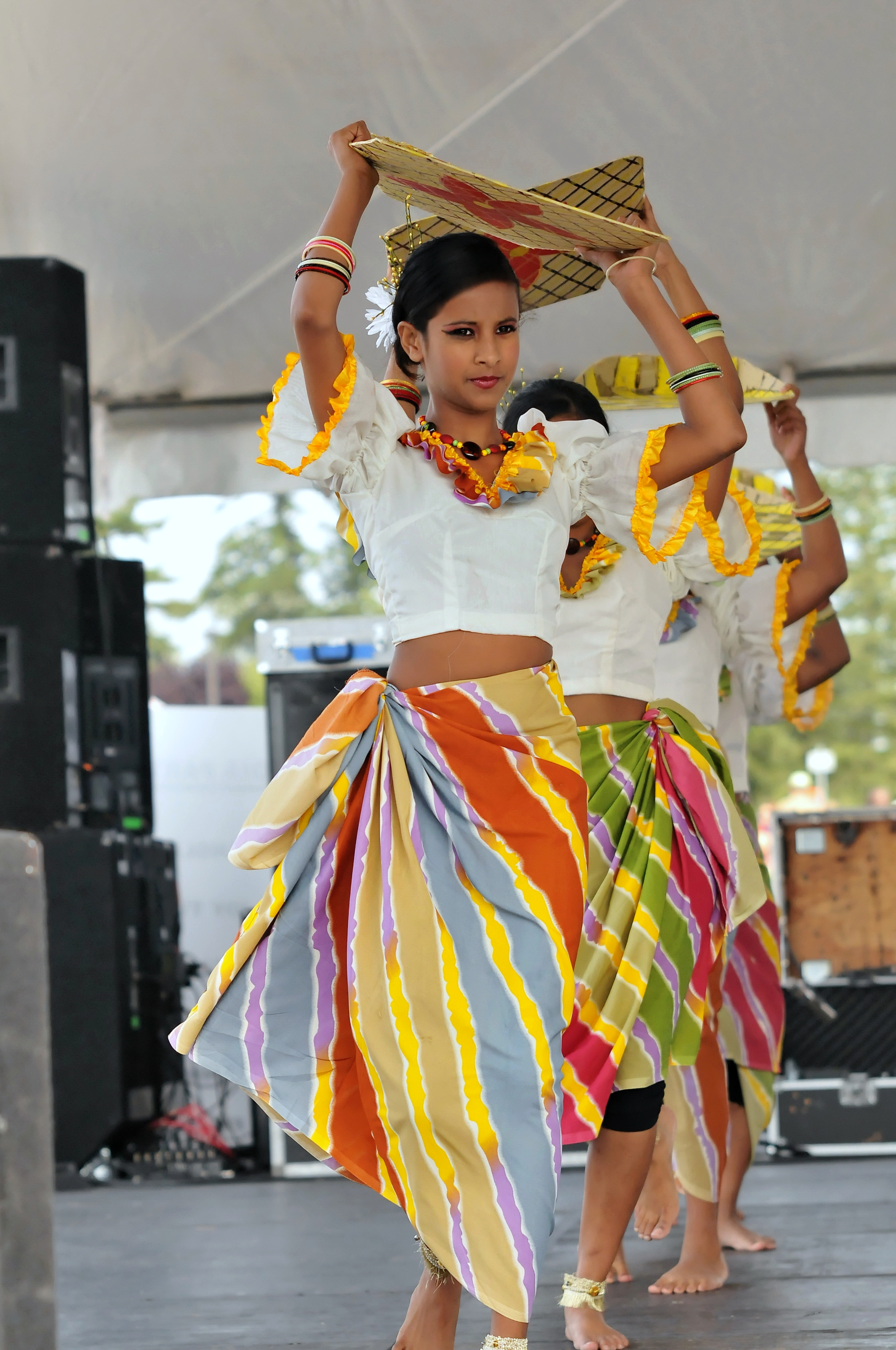
Traditional Sri Lankan harvesting dance

=== Dance ===
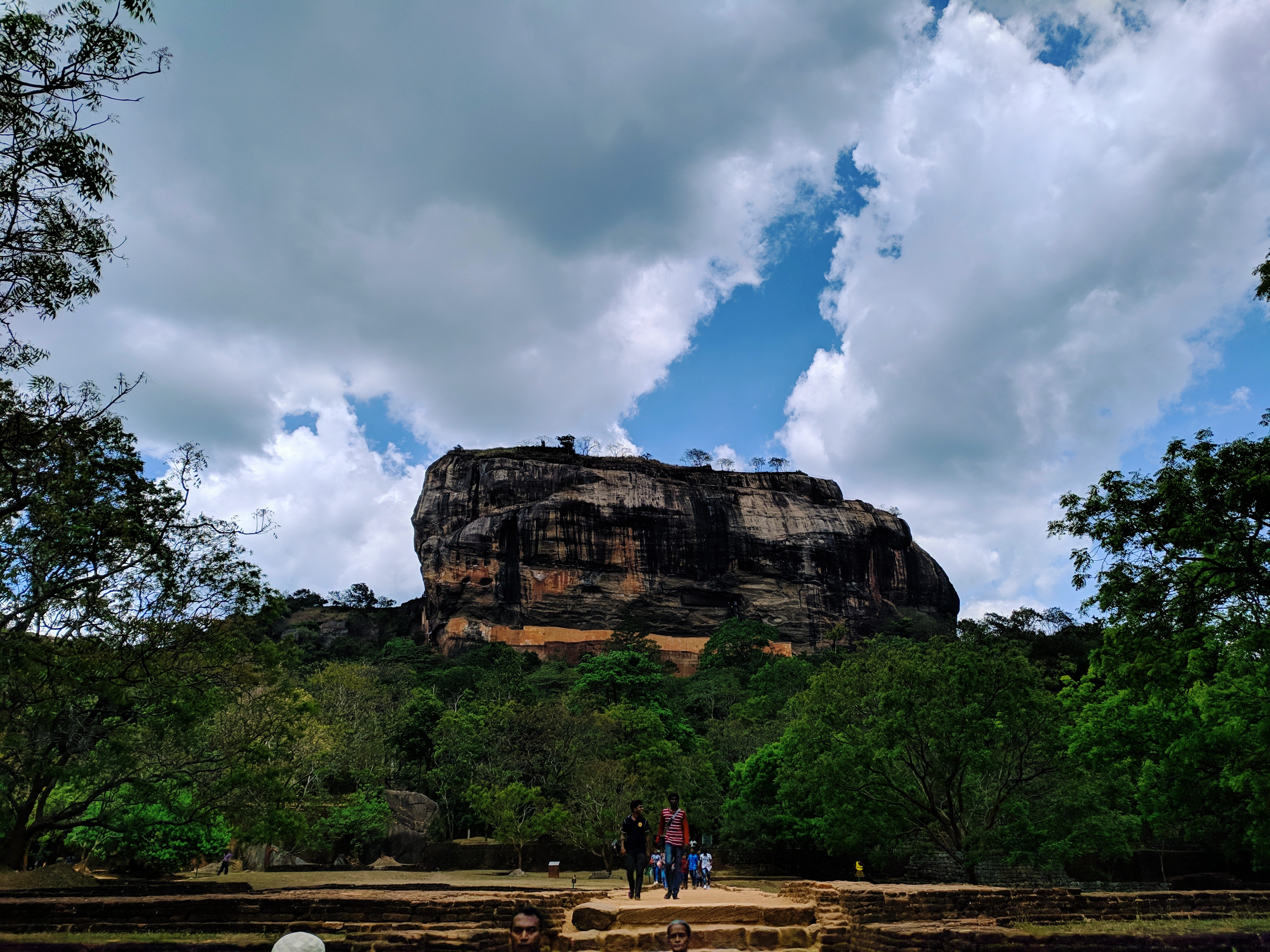
Sigiriya (Also called as Sinhagiriya)

Sri Lanka is home to a variety of dance styles including classical, folk and dance drama, such as Kandyan dancing. Sri Lanka has 3 main endemic dance styles. They are named as Udarata (Endemic to Kandy), Pahatharata (Endemic to the Southern Areas) and Sabaragamu which is endemic to the districts of Kegalle and Rathnapura which are situated in the province of Sabaragamuwa.

=== Music ===
The two single biggest influences on Sri Lankan music are from Buddhism and Portuguese colonizers. Buddhism arrived in Sri Lanka after Emperor Ashoka and his children propagated the religion to Sri Lanka, while the Portuguese arrived in the 15th century, bringing with them cantiga ballads, the ukulele, and guitars, along with African slaves, who further diversified the musical roots of the island. These slaves were called kaffrinha, and their dance music was called baila. Traditional Sri Lankan music includes the hypnotic Kandyan drums- drumming was and is very much a part of music in both Buddhist and Hindu temples in Sri Lanka. Most western parts of Sri Lanka follow western dancing and music.

=== Cinema ===
The movie Kadawunu Poronduwa (The broken promise), produced by S. M. Nayagam of Chitra Kala Movietone, heralded the coming of Sri Lankan cinema in 1947. Ranmuthu Duwa (Island of treasures, 1962) marked the transition cinema from black-and-white to color. In recent years, Sri Lankan cinema has featured subjects such as family melodrama, social transformation, and the years of conflict between the military and the LTTE. Their cinematic style is similar to Bollywood movies. In 1979, movie attendance rose to an all-time high, but a gradual decline has been recorded since then. Undoubtedly, the most influential and revolutionary filmmaker in the history of Sri Lankan cinema is Lester James Peiris, who has directed a number of movies which received global acclaim, including Rekava (Line of destiny, 1956), Gamperaliya (The changing village, 1964), Nidhanaya (The treasure, 1970), and Golu Hadawatha (Cold Heart, 1968.)There are many cinemas in the city areas.

== Lifestyle ==
=== Cuisine ===
The cuisine of Sri Lanka is primarily influenced by that of Southern India, Indonesia and the Netherlands. Rice is a staple and usually consumed daily, and it can be found at any special occasion, while spicy curries are favourite dishes for lunch and dinner. A very popular alcoholic drink is toddy or arrack, both made from palm tree sap. Rice and curry refers to a range of Sri Lankan dishes. Sri Lankans also eat hoppers (Aappa, Aappam,) which can be found anywhere in Sri Lanka. More recently, there has been a rise of westernised Tamil chefs returning to Colombo, including the now famous Janakan Gnananandan who spent his early years training in South London's Michelin Star restaurants. This influx has given rise to a new breed of Sri Lankan and Tamil cuisine that blends traditional spices with European fast food, such as Rmammidan, meaning hot chips that has proven very popular with younger generations.

Much of Sri Lanka's cuisine consists of boiled or steamed rice served with spicy curry. Another well-known rice dish is kiribath, meaning milk rice. Curries in Sri Lanka are not just limited to meat or fish-based dishes, there are also vegetable and even fruit curries. A typical Sri Lankan meal consists of a "main curry" (fish, chicken, or mutton), as well as several other curries made with vegetable and lentils. Side-dishes include pickles, chutneys and "sambols" which can sometimes be fiery hot. The most famous of these is the coconut sambol, made of scraped coconut mixed with chili peppers, dried Maldivian fish and lime juice. This is ground to a paste and eaten with rice, as it gives zest to the meal and is believed to increase appetite.

In addition to (sambols, Sri Lankans eat "(mallung", chopped leaves mixed with grated coconut and red onions. Coconut milk is found in most Sri Lankan dishes and it gives the cuisine its unique flavor.

Restaurants serving Indian and Chinese cuisine are popular and found throughout the country.

==== Spices ====
Sri Lanka has long been known for its spices. The best known is cinnamon which is native to Sri Lanka. In the 15th and 16th centuries, spice and ivory traders from all over the world brought their native cuisines to the island, resulting in a rich diversity of cooking styles and techniques. Lamprais rice boiled in stock with a special curry, accompanied by frikkadels (meatballs), all of which is then wrapped in a banana leaf and baked as a Dutch-influenced Sri Lankan dish. Dutch and Portuguese sweets also continue to be popular. British influences include roast beef and roast chicken. Also, the influence of the Indian cooking methods and food have played a major role in what Sri Lankans eat.

Sri Lankans use spices liberally in their dishes and typically do not follow an exact recipe: thus, every cook's curry will taste slightly different. Furthermore, people from different regions of the island (for instance, hill-country dwellers versus coastal dwellers) traditionally cook in different ways. Sri Lankan cuisine is known to be among the world's spiciest, due to the high use of different varieties of chili peppers referred to as amu miris (Green chilli), kochchi miris, and maalu miris (capsicum) and in Tamil Milakaai, among others. It is generally accepted for tourists to request that the food is cooked with a lower chili content to cater for the more sensitive Western palette. Food cooked for public occasions typically uses less chili than food cooked at homes, where the food is cooked with the chili content preferable to the occupants.

==== Tea culture ====
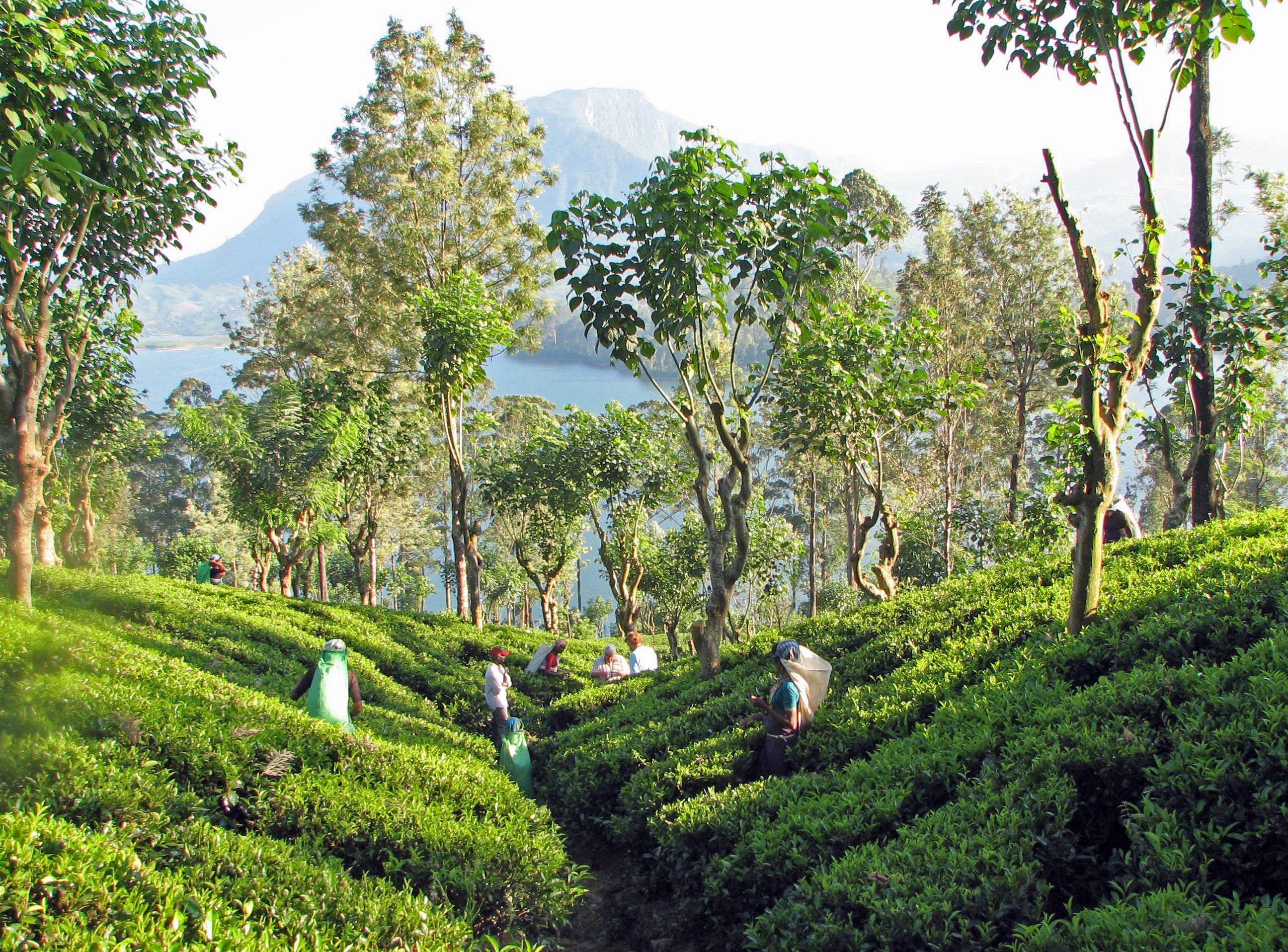
Tea plantation near Kandy

Tea is served whenever a guest arrives, it is served at festivals and gatherings.

=== Clothing ===
Traditional and modern clothing in Sri Lanka reflects the country's tropical climate, cultural diversity, and rich heritage. Because the island experiences warm weather year-round, garments are typically light, breathable, and designed for comfort.

=== 1. Traditional Women’s Attire ===
- The Kandyan Saree (Osariya): Widely considered the national dress for Sri Lankan women, particularly in the central hill country. Unlike the Indian saree, the Kandyan version features a fully enclosed, pleated skirt (osariya) tucked at the waist, with a ruffled edge and a distinct, attached pleated shoulder drape (pota) pinned at the shoulder. It is traditionally worn by brides and for formal state or cultural events.
- The Indian Saree: Worn by women of various ethnicities across the island, draped in the classic Indian style with the pallu thrown over the shoulder. It is popular for everyday wear, office attire, and festive occasions.
- Lanka-Style Half-Saree (Lenga / Pavadai Sattai): Traditionally worn by young girls before reaching puberty, consisting of a long skirt, a short blouse, and a draped scarf.

=== 2. Traditional Men’s Attire ===
- The Sarong: A long tube of fabric wrapped around the waist and secured with a knot or fold. It is worn casually by men at home, while working outdoors, or visiting temples. White sarongs paired with a long-sleeved white shirt are formal attire for weddings, funerals, and religious ceremonies.
- National Dress: A formal outfit for men consisting of a long-sleeved, collarless white tunic shirt paired with a white sarong or white trousers. It is commonly worn by politicians, public officials, and grooms.

=== 3. Modern and Everyday Wear ===
- Casual Wear: In major cities like Colombo and Kandy, modern Western clothing is the norm for everyday life. Men commonly wear t-shirts, polo shirts, jeans, and trousers. Women wear jeans, trousers, skirts, and western tops, alongside traditional attire like sarees and salwar kameez.
- Ethnic Diversity:
  - Sri Lankan Tamil women frequently wear the Salwar Kameez (a tunic paired with trousers and a scarf) or half-sarees.
  - Muslim women wear modest attire, including headscarves (hijab) or full-length abayas, alongside traditional or modern garments.

=== 4. Fabrics and Textiles ===
- Batik: A traditional art of wax-resist dyeing practiced widely in Sri Lanka, producing vibrant, intricate geometric and floral patterns used for dresses, shirts, and sarongs.
- Handloom: Handwoven cotton textiles created in local co-operatives across the island, prized for their durability and unique textures, frequently used to make colorful sarees, shirts, and home linens.

=== Festivals and holidays ===
==== New Year ====
The Sinhalese and Tamil New Year ("Aluth Avurudhu" in Sinhala, "Puthandu" in Tamil) is a very large cultural event on the island. The festival takes place in April (also known as the month of Bak) when the sun moves from the Meena Rashi (House of Pisces) to the Mesha Rashi (House of Aries). Unusually, both the end of one year and the beginning of the next occur not at midnight but at separate times determined by astrologers with a period of some hours between (the "nona gathe" or neutral period) being a time when one is expected to refrain from all types of work and instead engage solely in relaxing religious activities and traditional games. During the New Year festivities, both children and adults will often dress in traditional outfits. But the clothes must be washed and very clean because it should be pure.

==== List of holidays ====
* Public holiday, † Bank holiday, # Mercantile holiday All full-moon days are Buddhist holidays referred to as Poya. The actual date on which a particular Poya day will fall changes every year.

| Month | Date | Holiday | Details | |
|---|---|---|---|---|
| January | | Duruthu Full Moon Poya Day | In honour of the Buddha's first visit to Sri Lanka | *†# |
| January | 14/15 | Thai Pongal | Hindu harvest festival celebrated by Tamil people, dedicated to the Sun God Surya on the first day of the month of Thai in the Tamil calendar | *†# |
| February | 4 | Independence Day | Celebrates the 1948 independence from the British Empire | *†# |
| February | | Navam Full Moon Poya Day | Celebrates the Buddha's first proclamation of a code of fundamental ethical precepts for the monks | *†# |
| March | | Maha Shivaratri | Hindu festival to celebrate the wedding of Lord Shiva with Parvati, celebrated on the fourteenth day of Krishna Paksha in the month of Phalguna or Magha in the Hindu calendar | *† |
| March | | Milad-Un-Nabi | Prophet Muhammad's birthday | *† |
| March | | Medin Full Moon Poya Day | Commemorates the visit of the Buddha to his home to preach to his father King Suddhodana and other relatives | *†# |
| March–April | | Good Friday | Commemorates the crucifixion of Jesus Christ | *† |
| April | 13 | Day prior to Sinhalese and Tamil New Year Day | When the sun moves from the Meena Rashiya (House of Pisces) to the Mesha Rashiya (House of Aries), Sri Lankans begin celebrating their National New Year | *†# |
| April | 14 | Sinhalese and Tamil New Year Day | | *†# |
| April | | Additional Bank Holiday | | † |
| April | | Bak Full Moon Poya Day | Commemorates the second visit of the Buddha to Sri Lanka | *†# |
| May | 1 | May Day | | *†# |
| May | | Wesak Full Moon Poya Day | Beginning of the Buddhist calendar | *†# |
| May | | Day following Wesak Full Moon Poya Day | | *†# |
| June | | Poson Full Moon Poya Day | Commemorates the introduction of Buddhism to Sri Lanka | *†# |
| July | | Esala Full Moon Poya Day | Commemorates the deliverance of the first sermon to the five ascetics and setting in motion the Wheel of the Dhamma by Buddha | *†# |
| August | | Nikini Full Moon Poya Day | Commemorates the conducting of the first Dhamma Sangayana (convocation) by the Buddha | *†# |
| September | | Binara Full Moon Poya Day | Commemorates the Buddha's visit to heaven to preach to his mother and celestial multitude | *†# |
| October | | Eid al-Fitr | Ramadan Festival Day | *† |
| October | | Vap Full Moon Poya Day | King Devanampiyatissa of Sri Lanka sending envoys to King Asoka, requesting King Ashoka to send his daughter, Arahat Sanghamitta Theri, to Sri Lanka to establish the Bhikkhuni Sasana (Order of Nuns) | *†# |
| October–November | | Deepavali | Hindu festival of lights. It is celebrated on the new moon day in the month of Ashvin or Kartika in the Hindu Calendar | *† |
| November | | Il Full Moon Poya Day | Celebrates the obtaining of Vivarana (the assurance of becoming a Buddha) | *†# |
| December | | Eid al-Adha | Hajj Festival Day | *† |
| December | | Unduvap Full Moon Poya Day | Sanghamitta Theri establishes the Bhikkhuni Sasana (the Order of Nuns) | *†# |
| December | 25 | Christmas Day | Commemorates the birth of Jesus Christ | *†# |

=== Religion ===
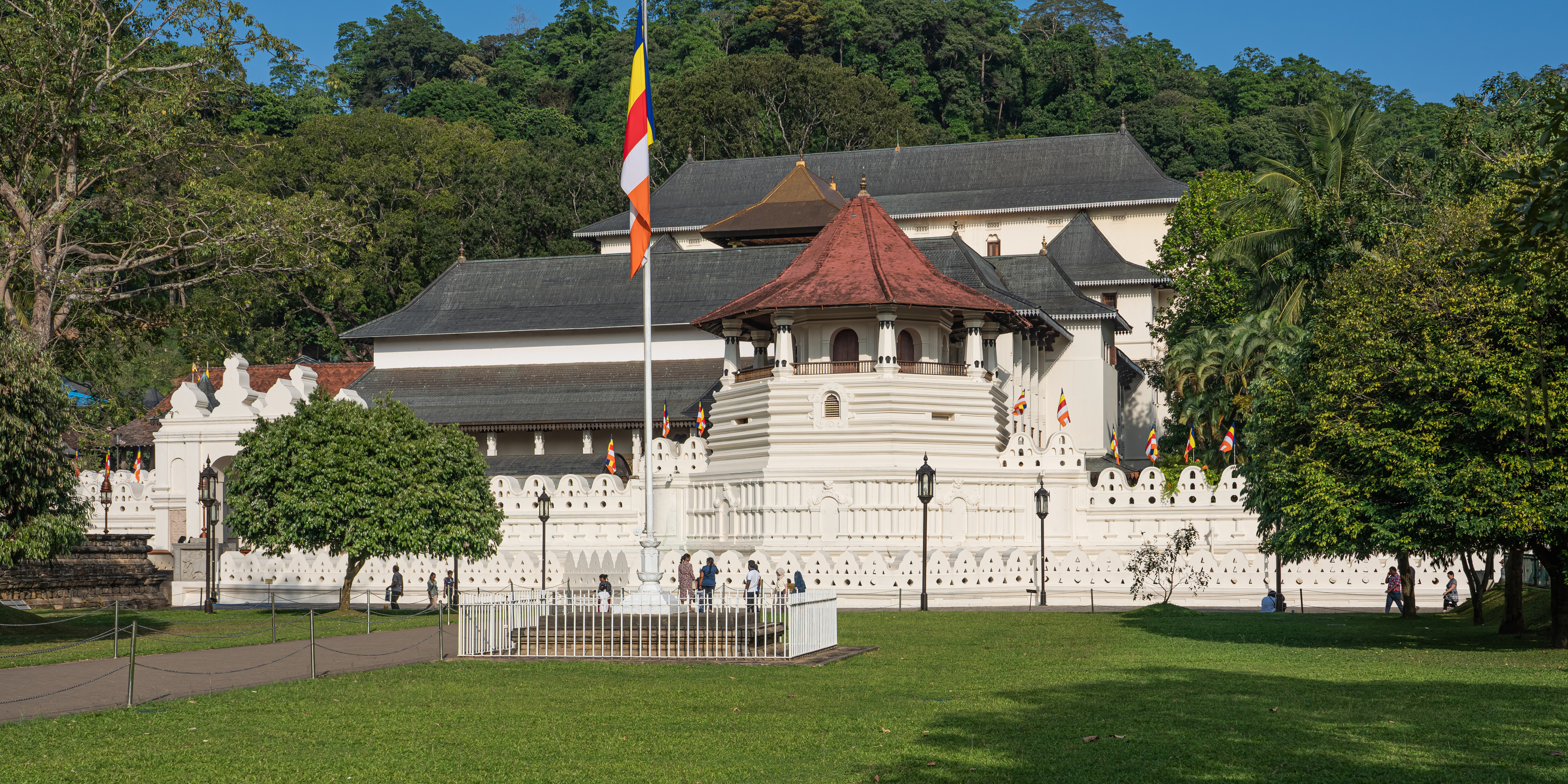
Sacred Tooth Temple in Kandy, Sri Lanka

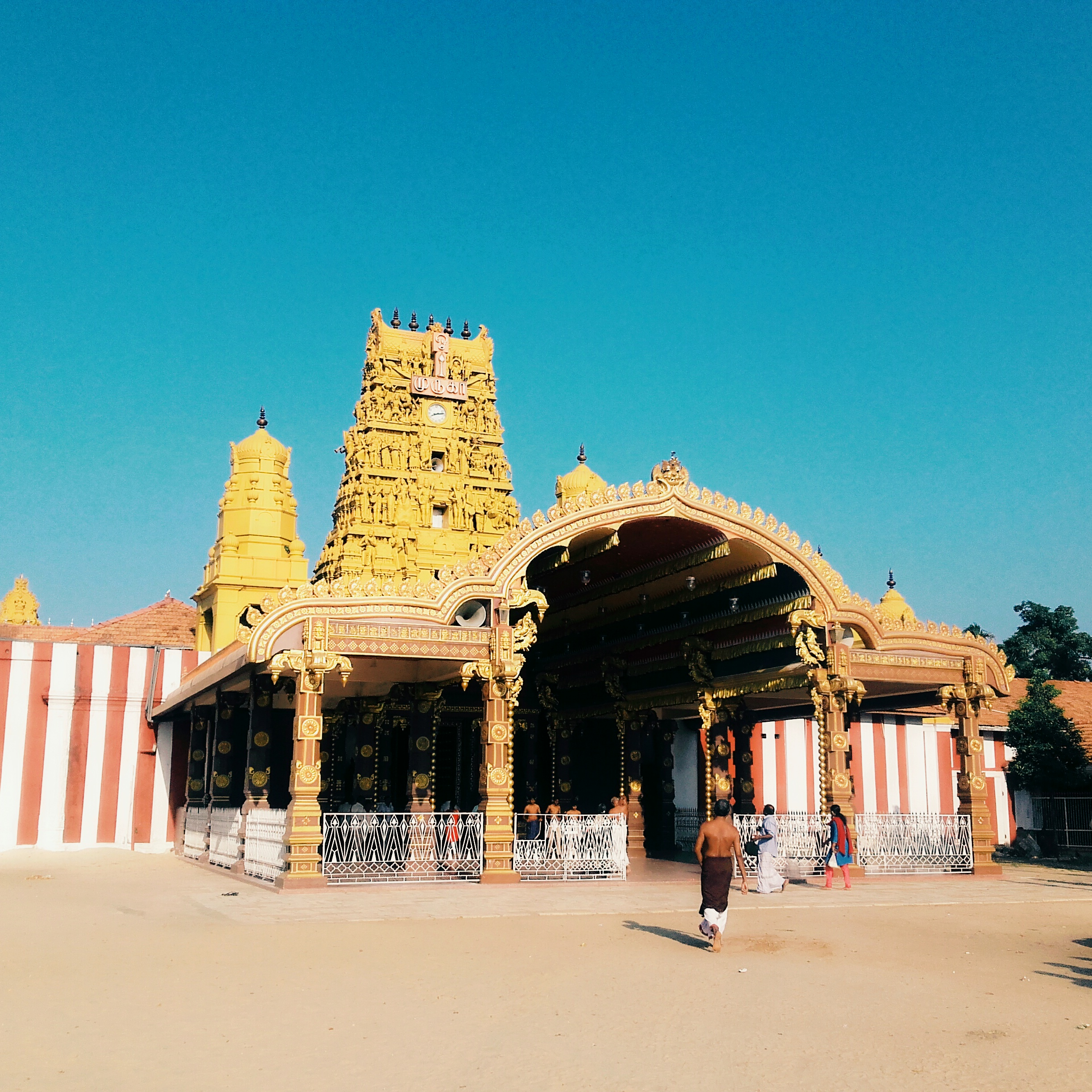
Nallur Kandaswamy Kovil in Jaffna

The Buddhist community of Sri Lanka observes Poya Days, once per month according to the Lunar calendar. The Hindus and Muslims also observe their own holidays. Sri Lankans are considered to be very religious, with 99% of polled individuals saying religion is an important part of their daily lives. The history of the island has been involved with religion numerous times. There are many Buddhist temples in Sri Lanka which date back to antiquity. In the middle of the temple, there is an old Boho tree. It is known that once Buddha had meditated here, so in honour of Buddha, people walk around the tree with pure water. After 4 rounds, they pour the water on the tree where Buddha meditated. When they walk around the tree, they pray. The trees are worshipped heavily. The religious preference of an area could be determined by the number of religious institutions in the area. The Northern and Eastern parts of the island have several notable Hindu temples due to the fact that the majority of the population living in these areas are Tamil. Ethnic conflict has severely affected other communities living in these areas during the times of LTTE strife. Many churches can be found along the southern coastline because of former Roman Catholic and Protestant colonial heritage. Buddhists reside in all parts of the island, but especially in the south, the upcountry, and the western seaboard. Buddhists are the largest religious group in Sri Lanka.

== Languages of Sri Lanka ==
While the Sinhalese people speak Sinhala as their mother tongue, the Tamil people speak Tamil. English is also widely spoken. Sinhala is spoken by about 17 million people in Sri Lanka, more than 14 million of whom are native speakers. About 24% of the total population speak Tamil. Both Tamil and Sinhala are official languages.

== Sports ==
Sports plays a very important part in Sri Lankan culture. The most popular sport in Sri Lanka is cricket, and as such, there are many cricket fields scattered across the island for children and adults to play the sport.

=== Cricket ===
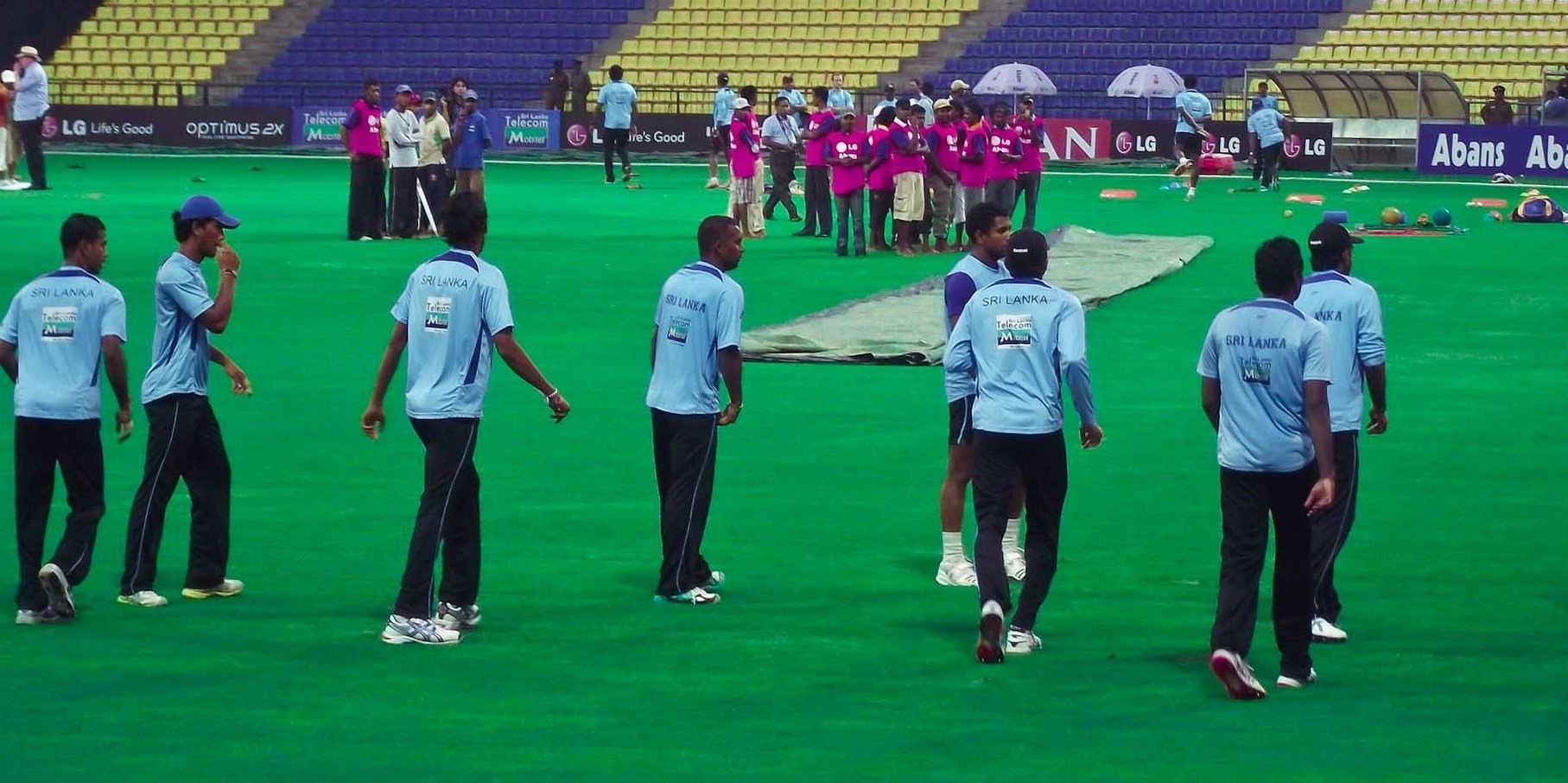
Cricket in Sri Lanka

Sri Lanka became the 8th Test playing nation and played their first Test match on 17–21 February 1982 against England. Since then, Sri Lanka became a force in international cricket, where they became the champions of 1996 Cricket World Cup. Then in 2014, Sri Lanka won 2014 ICC World Twenty20 as well. They also became six times champions of Asia Cup. Sri Lankans holds several world records, including highest Test wicket taker, ODI wicket taker, T20I wicket taker, highest Test total.

=== Volleyball ===
Volleyball is the national game of Sri Lanka.

== Birds in Sri Lankan culture ==
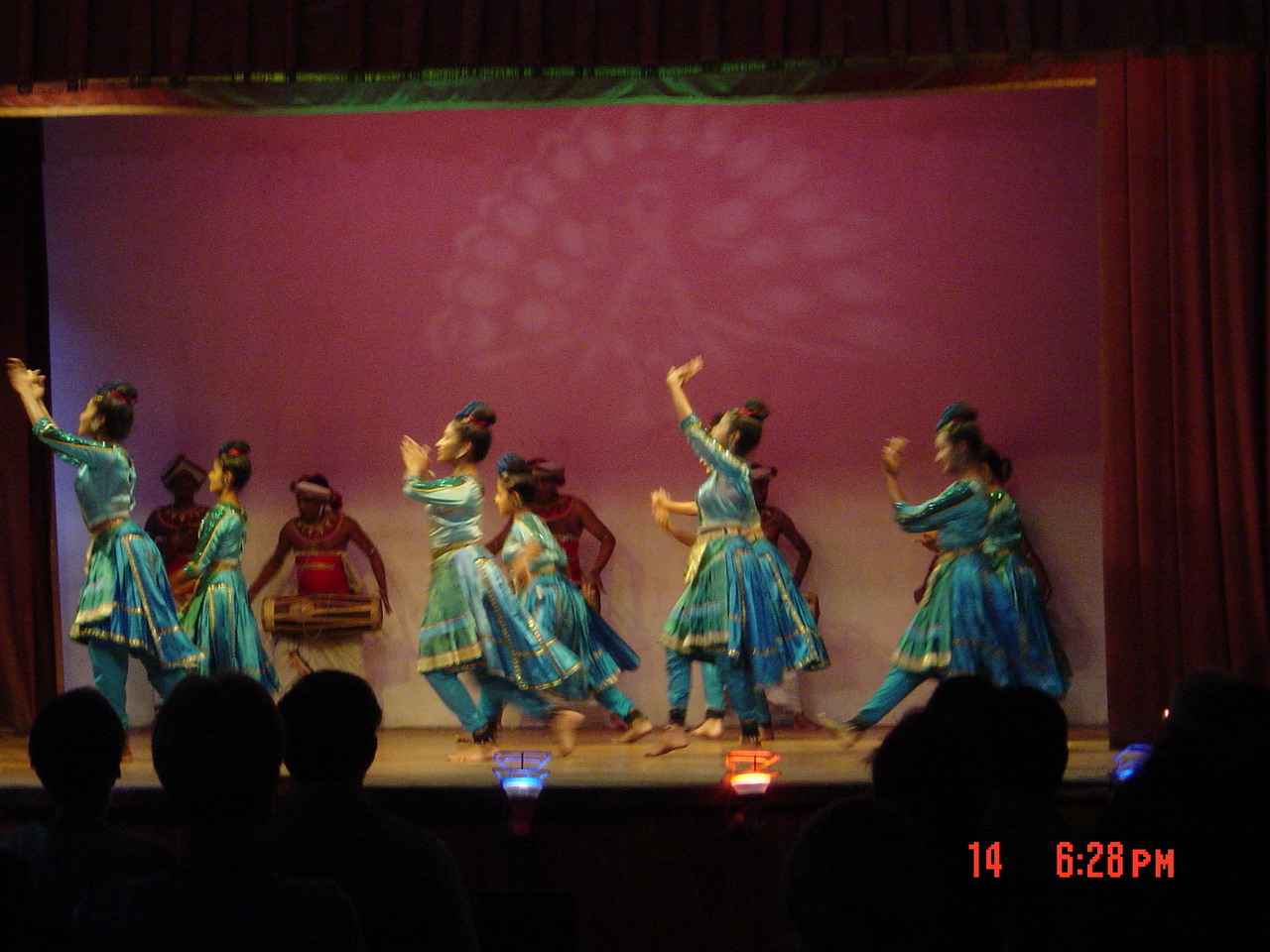
Kandy women performing the Peacock Dance

Birds hold a special place in Sri Lankan culture. Villagers maintain a nest at their home for home sparrows. Sparrows are believed to bring luck when residing in the home. The most popular bird in Sri Lanka is the peacock, the sacred bird of the God Kataragama.

There exist numerous stories about birds, society and people. Birds are considered to be sacred and local gods are believed to have travelled on them.

Gira Sandeshaya (Parrot Message), Hansa Sandeshaya (Swan message), Mayura Sandeshaya (Peacock Message) and Salalihini Sandeshaya (Myna Message) are pieces of ancient literature.

The King Ravana story involved a wooden aircraft called Dandu Monara (Wooden Peacock), in which Ravana flew to India to abduct Seetha, causing a war between him and Rama.

Ancient flags contained symbols of birds. some of them are,

- Two Swans Flag Dalada Maligawa, Kandy
- Walapane Disawa Gangaramaya, Kandy
- Maha Vishnu Dewala Flag, Kandy

There are the arts and crafts focused on birds. and some of them are,

- Sewul Kodiya Kundasale Vihare, Kandy
- Kandyan Dress
- Birds in Sandakada Pahana rock carving
- Ancient temple paintings
- A Special Brass Kendiya made in the shape of a bird used in marriage ceremonies

== National symbols ==
The National symbols within Sri Lanka and abroad, and these also represent the country's traditions, culture, history and geography. The national symbols of Sri Lanka are the national anthem, national flag, national emblem, national flower, national tree, national bird, national butterfly, national gemstone and national sport. They were picked up and officially announced at various times. There are also several other symbols that do not have official acknowledgment or announced as national symbols, but are considered as national symbols at the local level.

== Tourism ==
Tourist numbers are high in Sri Lanka- in March 2014 133,000 tourists visited.

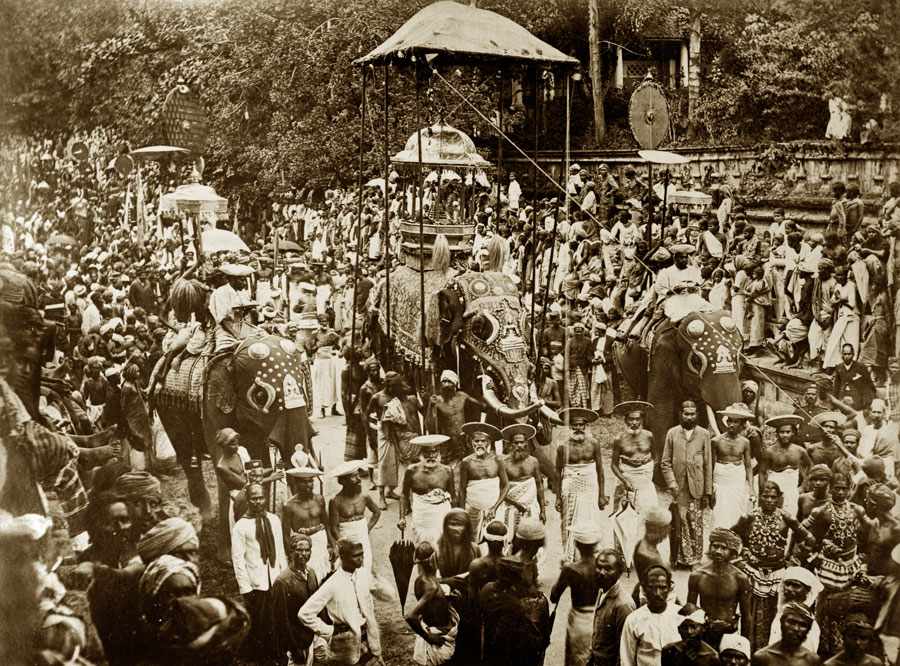
Esala Perehera festival, around 1885

As with any influx of tourism there are of course a number of negative influences that can arise. Sri Lanka's natural areas have, for instance, been affected by increased pollution with discharges into the sea and natural habitat loss, as well as the depletion of natural resources, which have arisen because of excessive water use in hotels, golf courses and swimming pools – which consume unnaturally large amounts of water. In response to this, the Department of Forest Conservation (Sri Lanka) and the Department of Wildlife Conservation (Sri Lanka) have instigated a number of protected areas of Sri Lanka – there are currently 32 forests under their protection – and in total – a little over 25% of the island is now a protected area. Emerging trends in the tourism industry in Sri Lanka points the way to tourists seeking more traditional experiences over conventional ideals such as tours and resorts. Consequently, these tourists seek out cheaper accommodation where they can be exposed to authentic villages and richer and more rustic experiences – this gives indigenous identities a chance to be preserved and not overtaken as tourism takes hold in the more remote areas, with Sri Lankan indigenous people taking their place as a part of the attraction for tourists and are thus protected and provided with support.

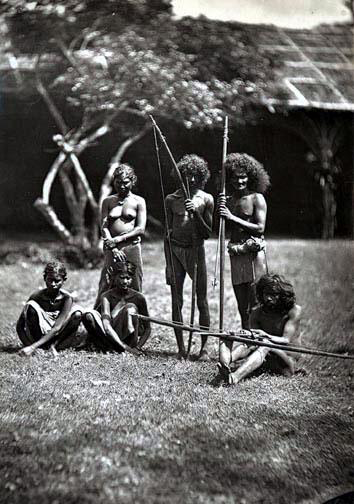
Sri Lanka aboriginal Vedda at work

Part of Sri Lanka's post-conflict development process is to build on the ever-growing tourism industry – this has meant refurbishing hotels, building new hotels and the country-wide revival of traditional handicraft industries, as well as traditional cultural displays – such as traditional dances of Sri Lanka, like the Kandyan Dances (Uda Rata Natum), Low Country Dances (Pahatha Rata Natum), Devil Dance, and Folk Dances which are now a common sight in hotels and villages that are keen to entertain tourists with traditional and 'authentic' cultural displays. Because of this, much of the modernization of the tourist industry is taking place in and around the capital Colombo, with one-thirds of the estimated 9000 new hotel rooms being built in Sri Lanka in 2013, concentrated in the Colombo area.

This kind of construction comes at a cost though – with a number of environmental concerns – the most pressing of which is Deforestation in Sri Lanka. In the 1920s, the island was almost 50% (49%) covered by trees but by 2005 this number had already fallen by 20%. The most badly hit area is the northern tip of the island – largely due to pre-existing environmental protection schemes in the south of the island. This is not all because of tourism, but also because of making way for new developments – hotels and resorts, and much of Sri Lanka's forests have been removed to make way for agricultural land and plantations (especially tea plantations, which require a substantial amount of land) to provide fuel and timber. An area where excessive building of hotels has already caused problems is Yala – where there are serious concerns about too many visits of the Yala National Park. Though a more positive side to the influx of tourists can be seen at the Esala Perahera festival in Kandy – which has grown substantially in size over the years, incorporating colorful parades and processions into what was already one of Asia's most prolific religious festivals. Traditional cultural dress is also rising in popularity – with chic hotels using formalized versions of traditional costume for their hotel staff, and foreigners marrying in Sri Lanka are incorporating traditional dress codes into their wedding attire.

== See also ==
- Sri Lankan people
- Sri Lankan literature
- Henry Parker (author), British engineer who studied and compiled the oral tradition of Sri Lanka.

== References to ancient art of Sri Lanka ==
- von Schroeder, Ulrich. 1990. Buddhist Sculptures of Sri Lanka. 752 pages with 1610 illustrations. Hong Kong: Visual Dharma Publications, Ltd. ISBN 962-7049-05-0
- von Schroeder, Ulrich. 1992. The Golden Age of Sculpture in Sri Lanka. [Catalogue of the exhibition held at the Arthur M. Sackler Gallery, Washington, D. C., 1 November 1992 – 26 September 1993]. 160 pages with 64 illustrations. Hong Kong: Visual Dharma Publications, Ltd. ISBN 962-7049-06-9
