= Maha Sona =

Demon in Sinhalese folklore

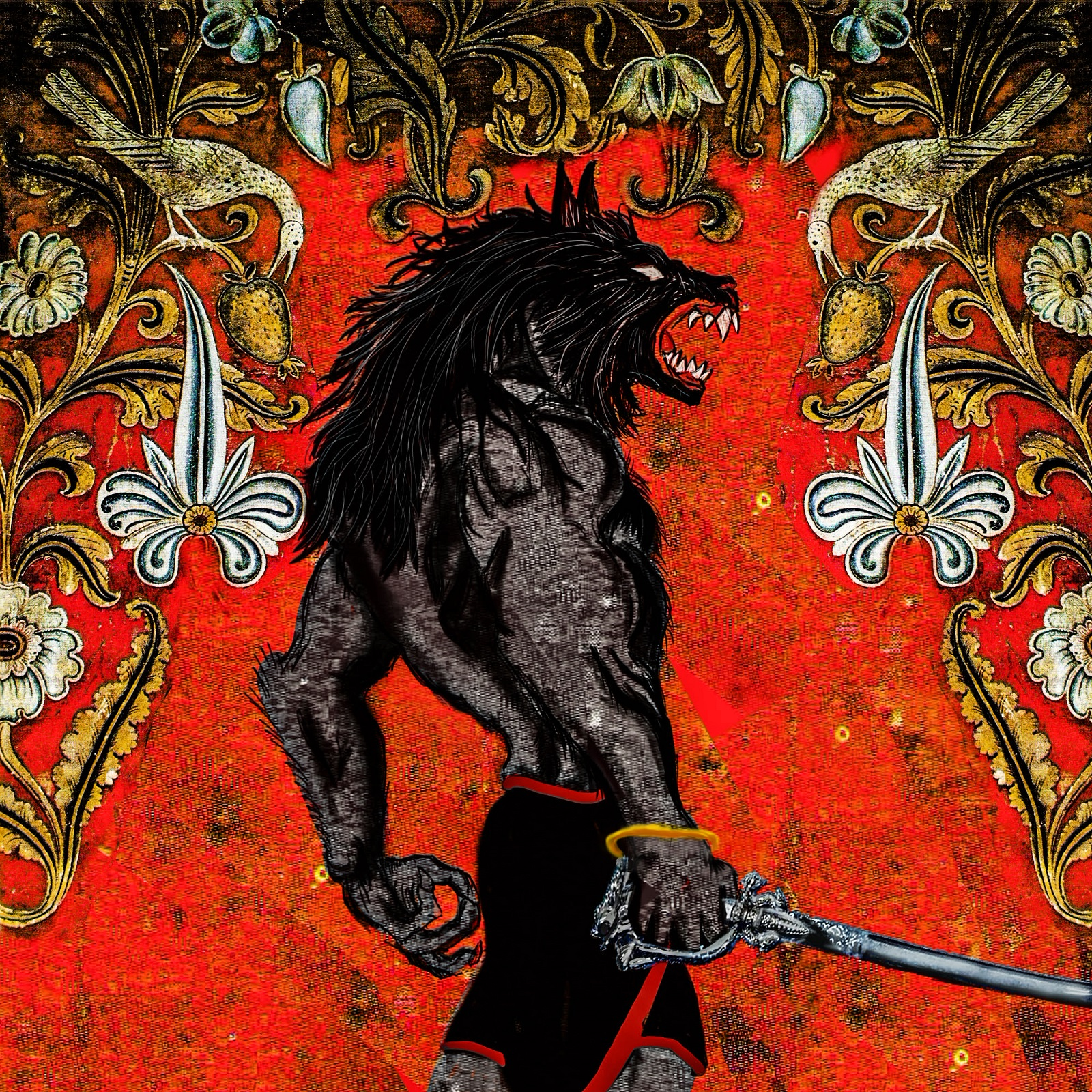
An artistic depiction of Maha Sona, the Sinhalese "demon of the cemetery." He is shown with a bear's head on a human body, referencing the legend where his original head was severed in a duel with the giant Gotaimbara.

Maha Sona or Maha Sohona (Sinhala: මහ සෝණා, මහ සොහොනා) is a devil (or yaksa or dewaya, meaning demon, fiend or monster) in Sinhalese folklore, said to haunt the afterlife. The name Maha Sona denotes "the greatest demon" or "god or demon of the cemetery" in the Sinhala language. He is one of the most feared and commonly known gods or demons in Sri Lanka. According to popular folklore, he was originally a giant who was defeated and decapitated in a duel by another giant, Gotaimbara (who lived in the 1st century BC). His head was then replaced with that of a bear or tiger. He is believed to kill people by crushing their shoulders or by afflicting them with disease. Traditional exorcism rituals are performed to repel the demon in such cases. The Sri Lankan Army's Long Range Reconnaissance Patrol units are popularly known as the "Maha Sohon Brigade", named after this demon.

== Origins ==
In local folk traditions, Maha Sona was formerly a human known as Ritigala Jayasena (Jayasena of Ritigala), a fierce warrior who lived during the reign of King Dutugamunu. After offending the giant Gotaimbara (one of the Ten Giant Warriors of King Dutugamunu) in a drunken stupor, he agreed to a bare-handed duel. Depending on the version of the tale, Gotaimbara decapitates Jayasena either accidentally or with a single kick, after which the cadaver is tossed into an open graveyard. Upon seeing Jayasena’s predicament, a deity takes pity on him and attempts to revive him before the cadaver grows cold (or another time limit is reached). With time of the essence and unable to find his head, the deity attaches a bear’s head in its place before reviving him. Due to the urgency, the head is fitted backwards.

After being revived, Mahasona’s grotesque appearance terrifies those who encounter him, leaving them so horrified that they fall ill shortly afterward. Believed to dwell in large graveyards, he is called ‘Maha Sohona’ or ‘Maha Sohon Yaka’ (Great Demon of the Graveyard) in popular versions of the legend. It is also worth noting that the term ‘sohon’ (සොහොන්) in Sinhala refers not only to ‘grave’ or ‘cemetery’ but can also mean ‘foul’ in a general sense. Therefore, ‘Maha Sohona’ can also mean ‘The Great Fell.’

However, folk songs across the country offer alternative origins for Maha Sona, sometimes not linking him to the figure of Jayasena. Depending on the song, he may be depicted as either a demon or a deity. Maha Sona is perhaps the most deeply ingrained supernatural being in the Sri Lankan psyche, unmatched in the fear his name evokes.

== Characteristics ==
Maha Sona is believed to haunt graveyards, searching for human prey. He also haunts large rocks and hills, surrounded by human corpses. Junctions where three roads meet are other haunting grounds of this demon, and he is said to spread cholera and dysentery. Maha Sohona is chief to 30,000 demons, and often uses various disguises, each time riding a particular animal such as a goat, deer, horse, sheep and elephant.

The 122-foot (37 m) tall demon has four eyes and four hands and his skin is red. He has the head of a bear or tiger, rides a pig and drinks the blood of a buffalo he carries in his right hand. He is also armed with a pike in his left hand.

Maha Sona kills people at night by striking them between the shoulders. The mark of a hand will be embossed on the flesh of the body afterwards. Apart from killing, he is also able to possess humans.

== Exorcism ==
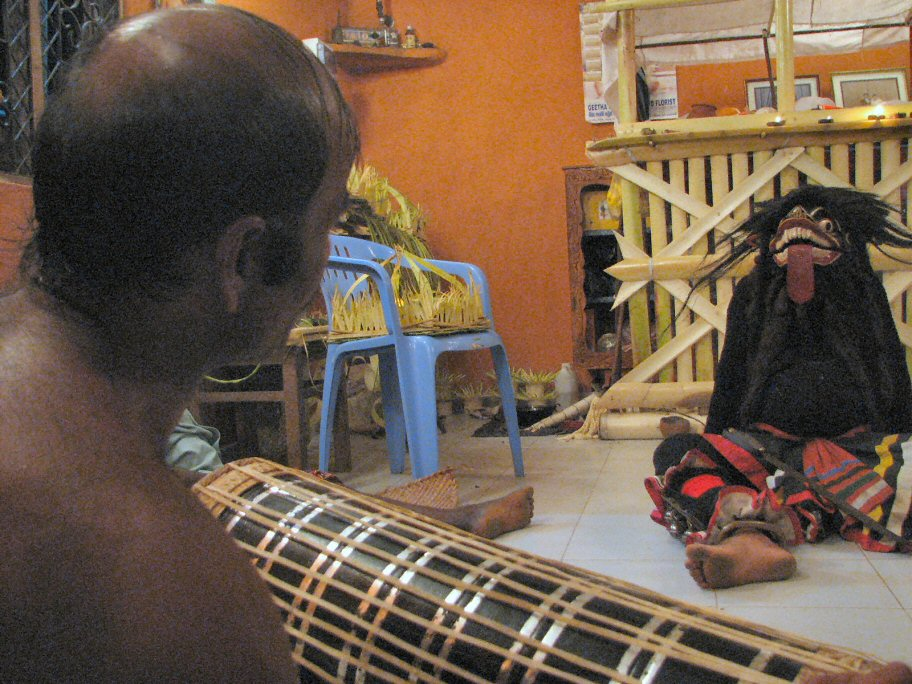
A drummer mocking Mahasona

In traditional exorcism rituals, dancers dressed as Maha Sona perform to cure patients of illnesses believed to be caused by the demon. A traditional mask depicting the face of Maha Sona is used in these rituals. It is also believed that when he comes to earth in human form, no one can stop him.

In the Galle District of Sri Lanka, Mahasona and other demons (yakshas) such as Riri Yaka were considered benevolent, despite causing illness in victims, which necessitated healing rituals. The exorcists belong to a particular caste, the Berawayas, many of whom perished in the Boxing Day Tsunami. The exorcist does not view Mahasona as evil, but instead jokes with him, plays cards and eats meat, usually throughout the night, until the patient is well the next morning. Professor Bruce Kapferer has written extensively on this in his book 'A Celebration of Demons: Exorcism and the Aesthetics of Healing in Sri Lanka'. Bloomington: Indiana University Press, 2nd edition, 1983.

== See also ==
- Sacca-kiriyā
- Paritta
- Reeri Yakseya
