= Dance in Sri Lanka =

Sri Lankan dances

Kandyan Dancers, amid performance.

There are several styles of classical and folk dance in Sri Lanka.

== Classical dances ==
There are three main styles of Sri Lankan classical dance:

- The Kandyan dances of the Hill Country, known as Uda Rata Natum;
- The low country dances of the southern plains, known as Pahatha Rata Natum;
- Sabaragamuwa dances, or Sabaragamuwa Natum.

Kandyan dance takes its name from Kandy, the last royal capital of Sri Lanka, which is situated about 120 kilometers from the modern capital at Colombo. This genre is today considered the classical dance of Sri Lanka. In Sanskrit terminology it is considered pure dance (nrtta); it features a highly developed system of "tala" (rhythm), provided by cymbals called "thalampataa". There are five distinct types; the ves, naiyandi, uddekki, pantheru, and vannams.

The three classical dance forms differ in their styles of body-movements and gestures, in the costumes worn by the performers, and in the shape and size of the drums used to provide rhythmic sound patterns to accompany the dancing.

The drum used in Kandyan dancing is known as the Geta Bera, the drum in Ruhunu (low country) dancing as the "Yak Bera", and drum in Sabaragamu dancing as the "Davula" (the word Bera or Bereya in Sinhale means "Drum") The Geta Bera is beaten with the hands as is also Yak Bera, while the Davula is played with a stick on one side and with one hand on the other side; the Geta Bera has a body which tapers on both sides while the Yak Bera and the Davula both have cylindrical bodies.

The main distinguishing feature between Kandyan and Sabaragamu dancing, and Ruhunu dancing, is that Ruhunu dancers wear masks.

== Dance styles ==
=== Kandyan dances (Uda Rata Natum) ===
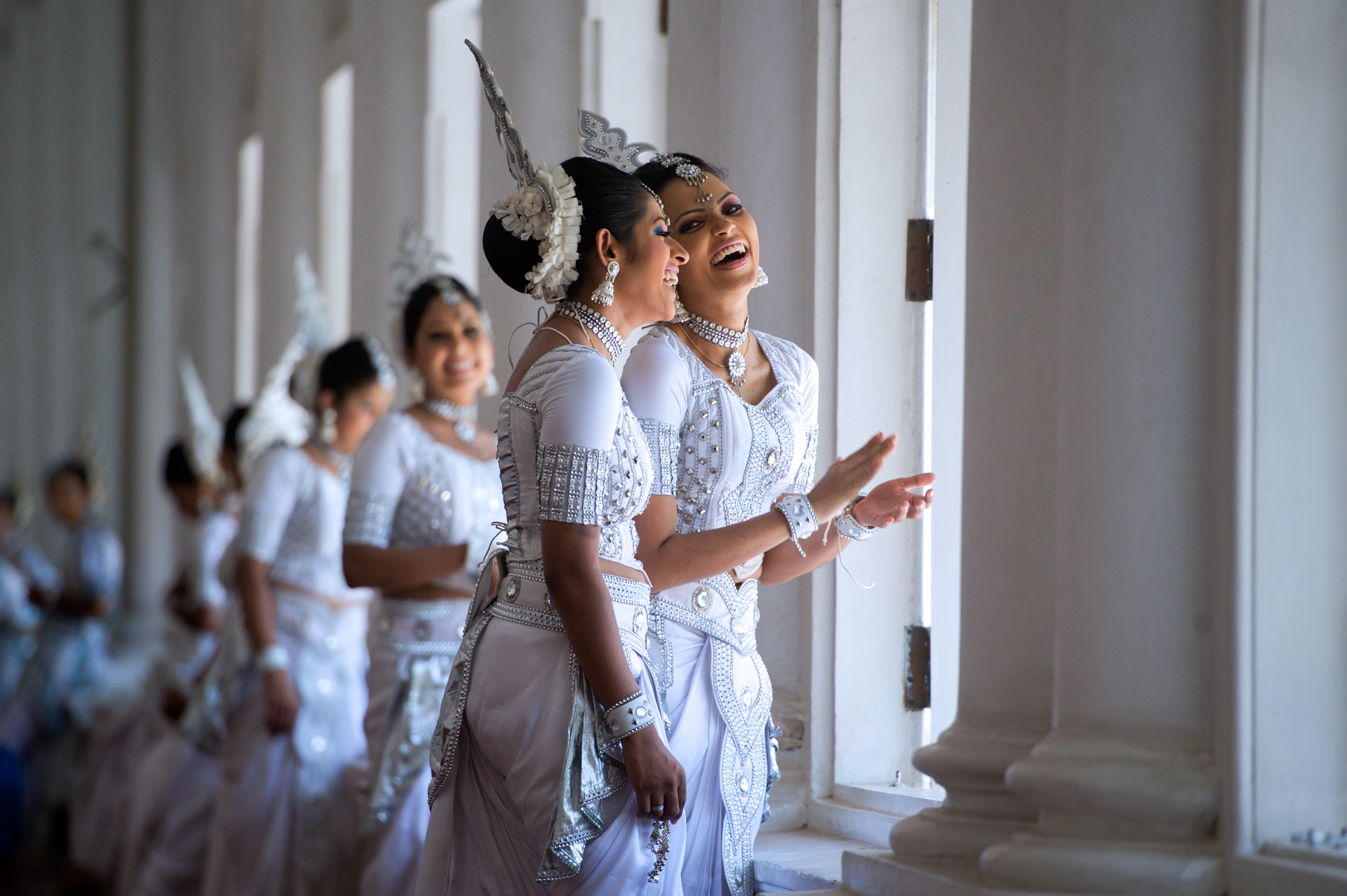
Female Dancers with Traditional Kandyan Dress

==== Ves dance ====
"Ves" dance, the most popular, originated from an ancient purification ritual, the Kohomba Yakuma or Kohomba Kankariya. The dance was propitiatory, never secular, and performed only by males.

Sri Lankan dancer in a dance position

==== Naiyandi dance ====
Dancers in Naiyandi costume perform during the initial preparations of the Kohomba Kankariya festival, during the lighting of the lamps and the preparation of foods for the demons. The dancer wears a white cloth and white turban, beadwork decorations on his chest, a waistband, rows of beads around his neck, silver chains, brass shoulder plates, anklets, and jingles. This is a graceful dance, also performed in Maha Visnu (Vishnu) and Kataragama Devales temples on ceremonial occasions.

==== Uddekki dance ====
Uddekki is a very prestigious dance. Its name comes from the uddekki, a small lacquered hand drum in the shape of an hourglass, about seven and one-half inch (1.3 centimeters) high, believed to have been given to people by the gods. The two drumskins are believed to have been given by the god Iswara, and the sound by Visnu; the instrument is said to have been constructed according to the instructions of Sakra and was played in the heavenly palace of the gods. It is a very difficult instruments to play. The dancer sings as he plays, tightening the strings to obtain variations of pitch.

==== Pantheru Dance ====
Pantheru dance is associated with goddess Pattini. Pantheruwa is a round musical instrument made from Brass, similar to a Tambourine without a drumhead. The place where it's held is called "Alluwa". The circumference of a Pantheruwa is usually 28 inches. This dance was used by ancient kings to signify victory in a battle.

==== Wannam ====
Originally a vannam (or wannam) was a kind of recitation. Most vannam describe the behaviour of animals such as elephants, monkeys, rabbits, peacock, cocks, serpents etc. Later dancers have used the vannam as a background song for their performance. There are 18 vannam in the Kandyan dance form. Traditionally a dancer would have to learn to perform all of these vannam before they would be gifted the ves costume. The most well known among these are the hanuma vannama (monkey), The ukusa vannama (Eagle) and the gajaga vannama (elephant).

The word vannam comes from the Sinhala word varnana ('descriptive praise'). Ancient Sinhala texts refer to a considerable number of vannam that were only sung; later they were adapted to solo dances, each expressing a dominant idea. History reveals that the Kandyan king Sri Weeraparakrama Narendrasinghe gave considerable encouragement to dance and music. In this kavikara maduwa (a decorated dance arena) there were song and poetry contests.

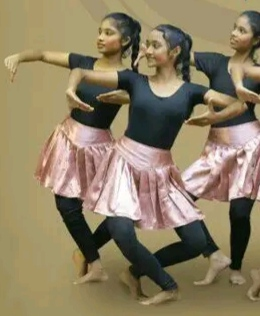
Sri Lankan school girls dancing practicing

It is said that the kavi (poetry sung to music) for the eighteen principal vannam were composed by an old sage named Ganithalankara, with the help of a Buddhist priest from the Kandy temple. The vannam were inspired by nature, history, legend, folk religion, folk art, and sacred lore, and each is composed and interpreted in a certain mood (rasaya) or expression of sentiment. The eighteen classical vannam are,

- Gajaga Wannama (elephant)
- Thuranga Wannama (horse)
- Mayura Wannama (peacock)
- Gahaka Wannama (conch shell)
- Uranga Wannama (crawling animals)
- Mussaladi Wannama (hare)
- Ukkussa Wannama (eagle)
- Vyrodi Wannama (precious stone)
- Hanuma Wannama (monkey)
- Savula Wannama (rooster)
- Sinharaja Wannama (lion king)
- Nayyadi Wannama (cobra)
- Kirala Wannama (red-wattled lapwing)
- Eeradi Wannama (arrow)
- SurapathiWannama (in praise of the leader of gods Sakra)
- Ganapathi Vannama (in praise of the god Ganapathi)
- Uduhara Vannama (expressing the pomp and majesty of the king)
- Assadhrusa Vannama (extolling the merit of Buddha)

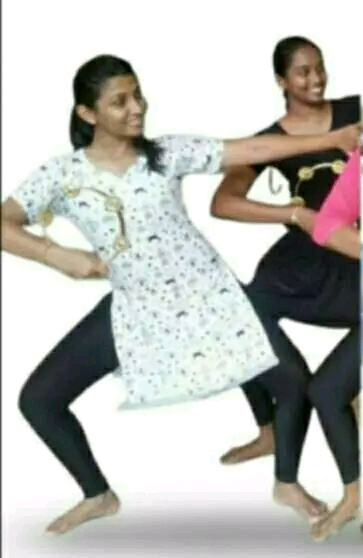
Sri Lankan dancers practising

To these were added,

- Samanala Vannama (butterfly)
- Mahabo Vannama (the sacred bo tree, Ficus religiosa, at Anuradhapura, said to be a sapling of the original Bodhi Tree under which Buddha attained enlightenment)
- Hansa vannama (swan)

The vannama dance tradition has seven components.

=== Kolam ===
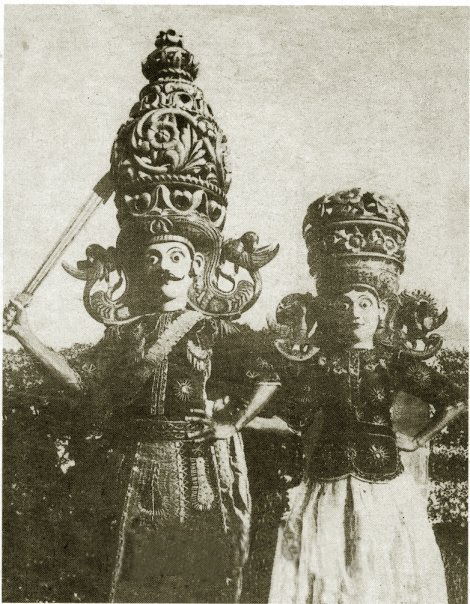
Maha Sammata king and queen

Kolam is a type of performing art unique to Sri Lanka. There is a popular legend for origin of Kolam dance. There were few groups and families from several parts of country for Kolam dance and Ambalangoda, Bentara, Matara, which were key areas for the dance's origin. Kolam was very popular during 1800 - 1950 period since it fulfilled both aspects of entertainment while also addressing spiritual aspects. Though enjoyed by many, it was given up by most of original inheritors as time passed, and due to lack of sponsorship from responsible parties.

Despite this, the oldest families and generations of Ambalangoda, Maha-Ambalangoda, and Tukka Wadu Gunadasa still continue the art in its original ways. As per the late Professor M.H. Gunathilaka (Dean of Department of Fine Art, University of Kelaniya 1978 -1992), who carried out research for low country dance of Sri Lanka, the art of Kolam Dance and Mask carving originated in Ambalangoda, by the Tukka Wadu generation many years ago given some key pieces of evidence.

Later, Professor Ediriweera Sarachchandra also collected resources from Mr. Tukka Wadu Gunadasa for the stage drama "Maname". Maname is one of the Kolam items/dramas belonging to the Tukka Wadu Generation. A single Conservation Center for traditional Kolam Dance and Mask in the country, which was made under the sponsorship of Government of Sri Lanka, is located in Ancestral Home of Tukka Wadu Generation, Maha-Ambalangoda, Ambalangoda, documenting the origins and details of Maname.

Kolam dance fundamentally consists of general characters who lived during monarchy, in combination with imaginary characters (very special dancing styles), popular legends, folktales, and religion stories connected to Buddha's previous life.

"Giri Devi" is a dance that recreates a folk tale about the Giri Yakshani of Demons who appears as a beautiful Goddess dancing gracefully, wearing a golden mask.

=== Sabaragamu dances (Sabaragamuwa Natum) ===
Sabaragamu dances are usually performed in Ratnapura, relating to the worshipping of God Saman, who is much revered by locals in Ratnapura. There are thirty-two main dances in Sabaragamuwa style.

== Devil dances ==
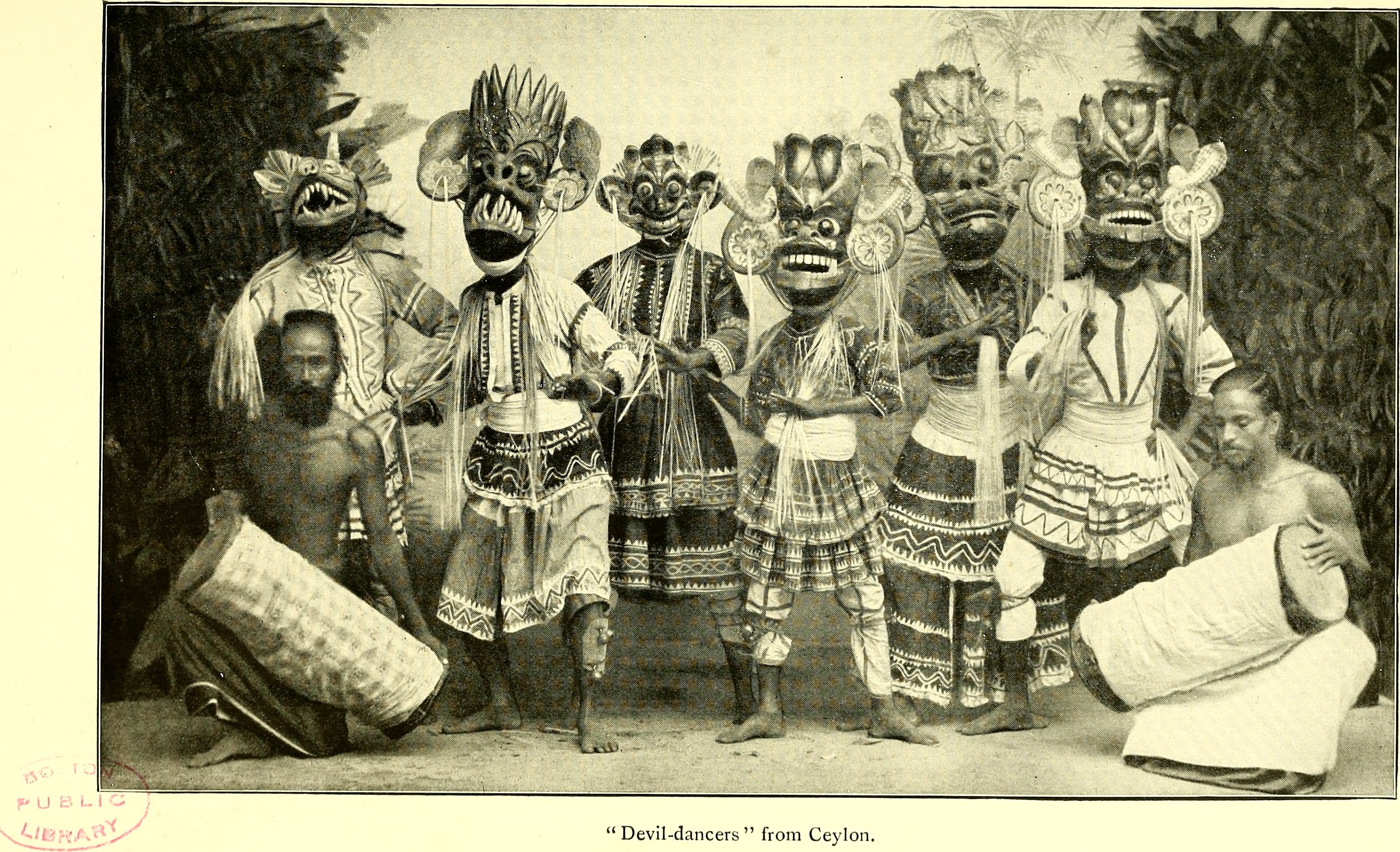
Devil Dances at the turn of the twentieth century.

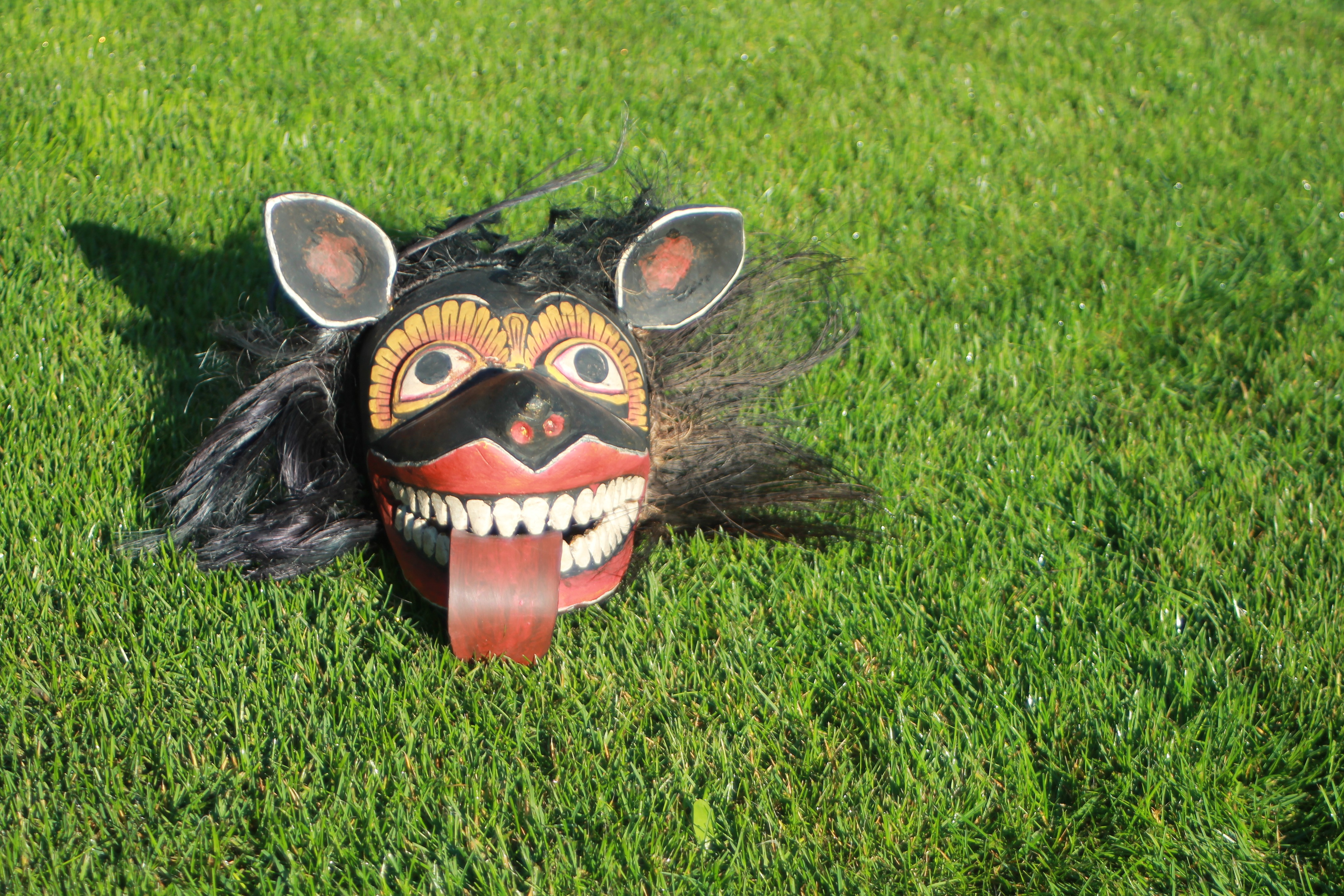
Mask of the demon Maha Sohona used in the Tovil Healing Ritual in Sri Lanka

The "Devil Dances" are an attempt to respond to the common belief that certain ailments are caused by unseen hands and that they should be chased away for the patient to get cured. If an individual or a family is not doing well, the village-folk believe that it's because that person or the family is being harassed by unseen hands. A 'tovil' ceremony is the answer.

The 'tovil' can be a simple ritualistic ceremony at home restricted to family and immediate neighbours or involving the whole village like the 'gam-maduva' or the 'devol-maduva' which is closely linked to the worship of gods. Masked dancers take part in at least two of the well-known 'tovil' ceremonies referred to as the 'Maha Sohon Samayama' and the 'Gara Yakuma'. The mention of 'Maha Sohona' frightens the people since he is believed to be the demon of the graveyards.

The performer disguises himself as a bear and wears a mask and a dress to resemble one. Often the 'tovil' involves the 'sanni' dances where all the dancers wear masks. The 'daha ata sanniya' refers to eighteen ailments with a demon being responsible for each one of them.

Dancers wearing masks depicting different characters take part in processions while at certain ceremonies. Of later origin are the masks worn by children and teenagers at street performances during Vesak. Popularly known as 'olu bakko' for the simple reason that oversize masks are worn, these performances keep the younger folk, in particular, entertained.

The simple version of the devil dance ritual usually starts in the morning with the building of the stage, decorations and preparation of the costumes. The performers build an intricate stage before which the dancing commences. The stage consists of a wall made of freshly cut natural materials such as coconut palm tree and banana tree trunks. Depending on the region and the available materials the stage may also be coated with clay mud. The dances are accompanied by drummers which also herald the begin of the ritual. The distinctive sound ensures all neighbours turn up to take part. The full ritual usually lasts until the morning, with the dancers consuming betel-nut juice and drinking coke to stay awake. Dances can however also go on for multiple days.

== Folk dances (traditional) ==
Apart from the classical dance forms there are also folk dances, which are associated with folk activities and festivities. Leekeli (stick dance), kalagedi (pot dance), raban (hand drum), and polkatu (coconut) and Kulu (harvesting) are folk dances prevalent at the present time.

== Dance drama ==
There is also in the low country a dance-drama called Kolam, in which the performers wear masks depicting animals or people such as kings or high officials. The Kolam provides amusement and social satire rather than ritual. It has been suggested by scholars that Kolam may have developed from the ritual known as Sanni Yakuma, later becoming a dance-drama independent of ritual elements.

== Dances today and then ==
The classical dance forms are associated with performance of various rituals and ceremonies which are centuries old and are based on folk religion and folk beliefs going back to before the advent of Buddhism and its acceptance by the Sinhalese people in the 3rd century BC. These rituals and ceremonies reflect the values, beliefs and customs of an agricultural civilization.

The pre-Buddhistic folk religion consisted of the belief in a variety of deities and demons who were supposed to be capable of awarding benefits and blessings, but also causing afflictions and diseases. Accordingly, they had to be either propitiated or exorcised with offerings and the performance of rituals and ceremonies.

The repertoire of Kandyan dancing has its origins in the ritual known as the Kohomba Kankariya, which is performed to propitiate the deity known as Kohomba for the purpose of obtaining relief from personal afflictions or from communal calamities such as pestilence. Although this ritual is rarely performed at the present, the various dances associated with its performance could be seen in the Kandy Esala Perahera, and annual religion-cultural event which takes place in the city of Kandy in honour of the sacred tooth-relic of the Buddha housed in the Dalada Maligawa, the Temple of the Sacred Tooth.

The repertoire of Ruhunu dancing has its origins in the rituals of the Devol Maduwa - used to propitiate the Deity/demon Devol - and in exorcistic rituals known as the Rata Yakuma and the Sanni Yakuma - associated with various demons who are supposed to cause a variety of afflictions and incurable illnesses.

Sabaragamu dancing is associated with the ritual known as the Gam Maduwa, which is performed to propitiate the goddess Pattini. The purpose is to obtain a good harvest or to ward off evil or to be rid of an infectious disease.

Sri Lanka's rich heritage and culture has been the roots to the creation of such varied vibrant dance forms. The nation has continued to preserve and develop its varied dance forms with a modern touch, performing extensively locally and across the globe. Traditional Sri Lankan Dance with a modern touch. Rupathnari is another contemporary fusion mix dance.

== See also ==
- Kummi
