= Reeri Yakseya =

Reeri Yakseya (Sinhala: රීරි යක්ෂයා) or Riri Yaka is a demon in Sinhalese folklore, believed to be one of the most cruel and powerful, second only to Mahasona (Ritigala Jayasena or Ritigala Jayasinha). He has the body of a human and the head of a monkey. His skin is fiery red, and he rides a red bull. It is believed he can afflict all kinds of illnesses on humans, but hemorrhages and blood diseases are especially attributed to him.

When a person is on their deathbed, Reeri Yakseya is believed to be present, appearing as an apparition with the appearance of a pygmy. He stands by the dying person holding a Rooster in one hand and a club in the other, and the corpse of a man in his mouth. The apparition is said to be only one span and six inches in height. When Reeri Yakseya assumes this form, he is known as "Maru Avatar". He can assume 18 other apparitions, known by these names:

- Reeri Yakseya (in his original form)
- Ree Rajja
- Agu Rajja
- Pulutajja
- Reeri Gopalla
- Reeri Buddia
- Reeri WatMaru Avatar Yakseya

A less popular belief is that these are not apparitions of the same demon but of 18 individual demons who work together.

Reeri Yakseya is believed to have more than a hundred incarnations as different people, including the son of a king named Sanka Pala, a son of the king of Lagal Pura, and a female demon called Ginimuru Yaksani in Hanumanta Desay. Originally, Reeri Yakseya could not be controlled by any of the gods, and all feared him until the god Vishnu managed to bind him with a charmed jungle creeper.
