= Borella South Grama Niladhari Division =

Borella South
- Grama Niladhari Division
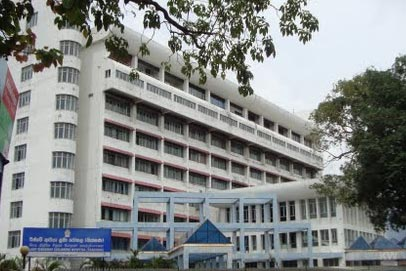
- Coordinates: 6.915147°N 79.879751°E
- Country: Sri Lanka
- Province: Western Province
- District: Colombo District
- Divisional Secretariat: Thimbirigasyaya Divisional Secretariat
- Electoral District: Colombo Electoral District
- Polling Division: Borella Polling Division

Area
  - Total: 0.71 km^{2} (0.27 sq mi)
- Elevation: 41 m (135 ft)

Population (2012)
  - Total: 5,127
  - Density: 7,221/km^{2} (18,700/sq mi)
- ISO 3166 code: LK-1127045

Borella South

Borella South Grama Niladhari Division is a Grama Niladhari Division of the Thimbirigasyaya Divisional Secretariat of Colombo District of Western Province, Sri Lanka.

Borella, Welikada, Lady Ridgeway Hospital for Children, Devi Balika Vidyalaya, Paikiasothy Saravanamuttu Stadium, 2012 Welikada prison riot, Department of Prisons, Western Hospital, Welikada Prison and Kanatte Cemetery are located within, nearby or associated with Borella South.

Borella South is a surrounded by the Gothamipura, Narahenpita, Kurunduwatta and Borella North Grama Niladhari Divisions.

== Demographics ==
=== Ethnicity ===
The Borella South Grama Niladhari Division has a Sinhalese majority (67.5%), a significant Moor population (14.7%) and a significant Sri Lankan Tamil population (14.4%). In comparison, the Thimbirigasyaya Divisional Secretariat (which contains the Borella South Grama Niladhari Division) has a Sinhalese majority (52.8%), a significant Sri Lankan Tamil population (28.0%) and a significant Moor population (15.1%)

Ethnicity in Borella South
1. Sinhalese (67.5%)
2. Moor (14.7%)
3. Sri Lankan Tamil (14.4%)
4. Other (3.40%)

=== Religion ===
The Borella South Grama Niladhari Division has a Buddhist majority (57.4%), a significant Muslim population (16.7%) and a significant Hindu population (11.9%). In comparison, the Thimbirigasyaya Divisional Secretariat (which contains the Borella South Grama Niladhari Division) has a Buddhist plurality (47.9%), a significant Hindu population (22.5%) and a significant Muslim population (17.4%)

Religion in Borella South
1. Buddhist (57.4%)
2. Muslim (16.7%)
3. Hindu (11.9%)
4. Roman Catholic (8.40%)
5. Other Christian (5.50%)
6. Other (0.10%)

== Gallery ==
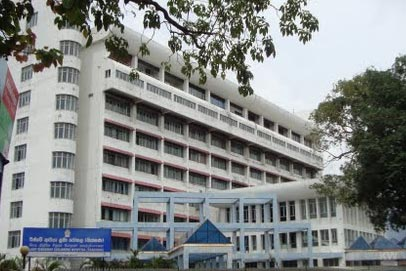
Lady Ridgeway Hospital for Children

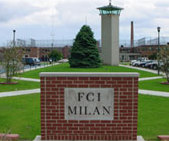
Department of Prisons

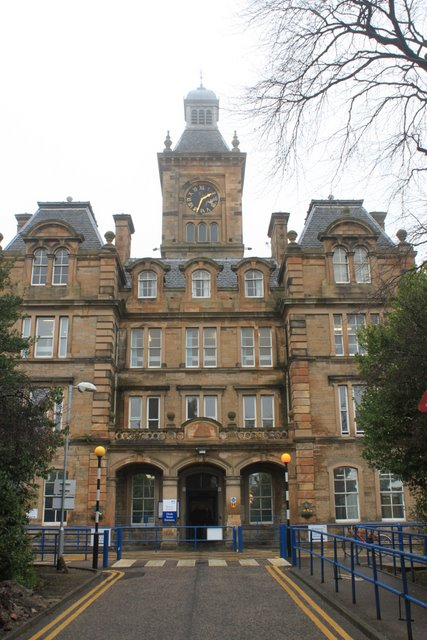
Western Hospital

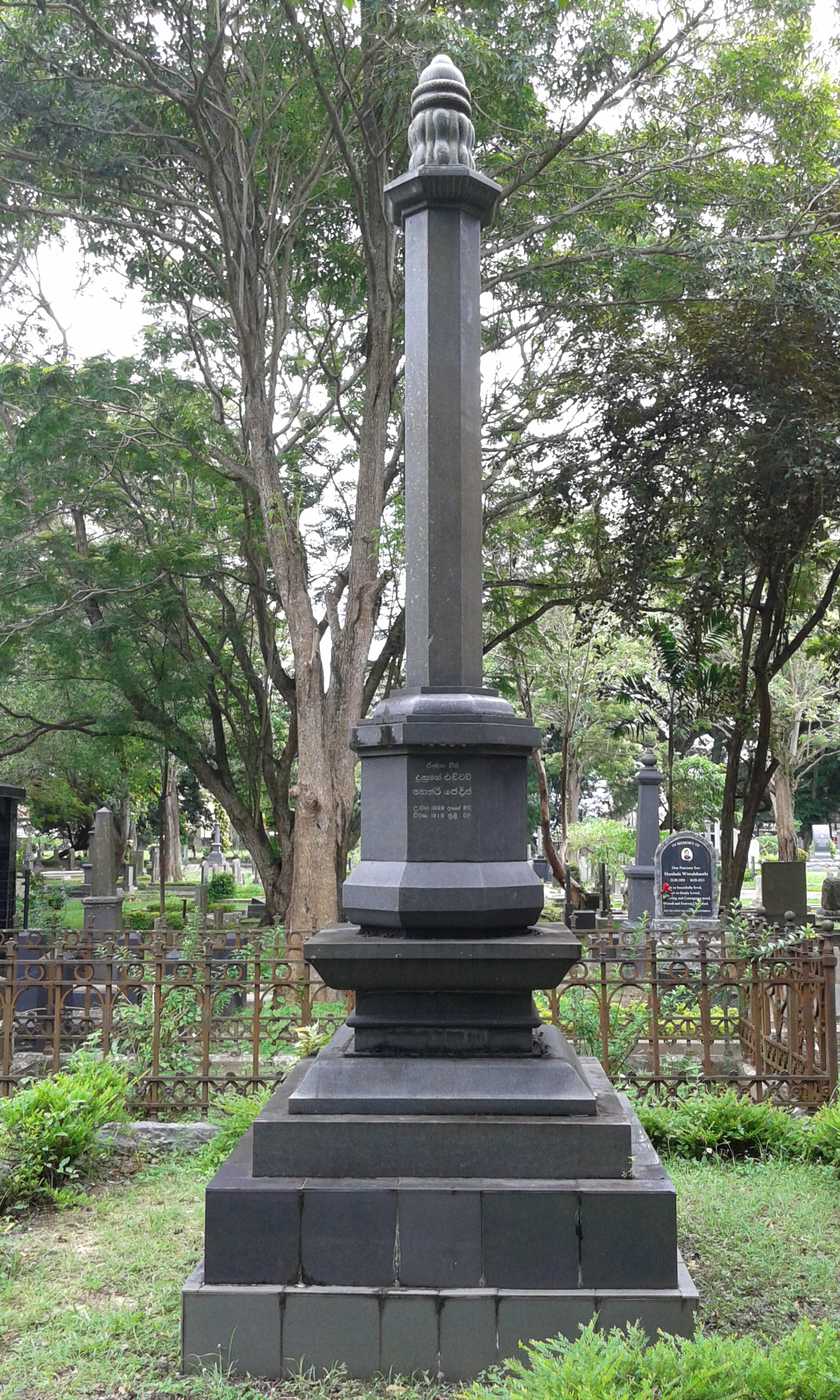
Kanatte Cemetery
