= Wanathamulla Grama Niladhari Division =

Wanathamulla
- Grama Niladhari Division
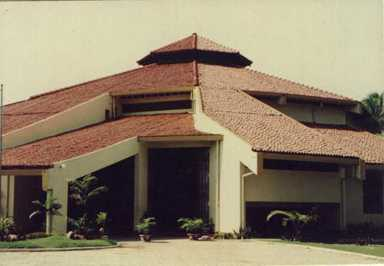
- Nalanda College, Colombo is located within, nearby or associated with the Wanathamulla Grama Niladhari Division
- Interactive map of Wanathamulla
- Coordinates: 6.926187°N 79.880915°E
- Country: Sri Lanka
- Province: Western Province
- District: Colombo District
- Divisional Secretariat: Thimbirigasyaya Divisional Secretariat
- Electoral District: Colombo Electoral District
- Polling Division: Borella Polling Division

Area
  - Total: 0.67 km^{2} (0.26 sq mi)
- Elevation: 10 m (33 ft)

Population (2012)
  - Total: 17,355
  - Density: 25,903/km^{2} (67,090/sq mi)
- ISO 3166 code: LK-1127035

Wanathamulla

Wanathamulla Grama Niladhari Division is a Grama Niladhari Division of the Thimbirigasyaya Divisional Secretariat of Colombo District of Western Province, Sri Lanka.

Veluwana College, Welikada Prison, Dematagoda, Department of Prisons, 2012 Welikada prison riot, Panchikawatte, Nalanda College, Colombo, Paikiasothy Saravanamuttu Stadium and St. John's College, Colombo are located within, nearby or associated with Wanathamulla.

Wanathamulla is a surrounded by the Maligawatta East, Gajabapura, Dematagoda, Welikada West, Borella North and Kuppiyawatta East Grama Niladhari Divisions.

== Demographics ==
=== Ethnicity ===
The Wanathamulla Grama Niladhari Division has a Sinhalese majority (53.4%), a significant Sri Lankan Tamil population (29.1%) and a significant Moor population (14.5%). In comparison, the Thimbirigasyaya Divisional Secretariat (which contains the Wanathamulla Grama Niladhari Division) has a Sinhalese majority (52.8%), a significant Sri Lankan Tamil population (28.0%) and a significant Moor population (15.1%)

Ethnicity in Wanathamulla
1. Sinhalese (53.4%)
2. Sri Lankan Tamil (29.1%)
3. Moor (14.5%)
4. Other (2.90%)

=== Religion ===
The Wanathamulla Grama Niladhari Division has a Buddhist majority (50.7%), a significant Muslim population (16.9%), a significant Hindu population (14.3%) and a significant Roman Catholic population (13.0%). In comparison, the Thimbirigasyaya Divisional Secretariat (which contains the Wanathamulla Grama Niladhari Division) has a Buddhist plurality (47.9%), a significant Hindu population (22.5%) and a significant Muslim population (17.4%)

Religion in Wanathamulla
1. Buddhist (50.7%)
2. Muslim (16.9%)
3. Hindu (14.3%)
4. Roman Catholic (13.0%)
5. Other Christian (5.00%)
6. Other (0.00%)

== Gallery ==
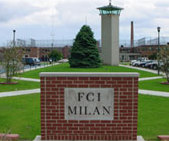
Department of Prisons

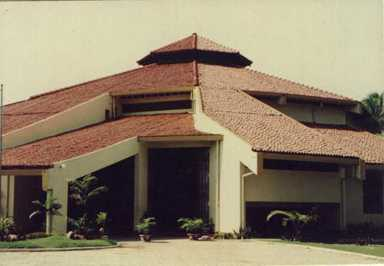
Nalanda College, Colombo
