= Kuppiyawatta East Grama Niladhari Division =

Kuppiyawatta East
- Grama Niladhari Division
- Interactive map of Kuppiyawatta East
- Coordinates: 6.926481°N 79.873832°E
- Country: Sri Lanka
- Province: Western Province
- District: Colombo District
- Divisional Secretariat: Thimbirigasyaya Divisional Secretariat
- Electoral District: Colombo Electoral District
- Polling Division: Borella Polling Division

Area
  - Total: 0.63 km^{2} (0.24 sq mi)
- Elevation: 11 m (36 ft)

Population (2012)
  - Total: 10,577
  - Density: 16,789/km^{2} (43,480/sq mi)
- ISO 3166 code: LK-1127025

Kuppiyawatta East

Kuppiyawatta East Grama Niladhari Division is a Grama Niladhari Division of the Thimbirigasyaya Divisional Secretariat of Colombo District of Western Province, Sri Lanka .

Panchikawatte, St. John's College, Colombo, Nalanda College, Colombo, Dharmasoka College, Ananda College, Dematagoda, Veluwana College, Department of Prisons, 2012 Welikada prison riot and Welikada Prison are located within, nearby or associated with Kuppiyawatta East.

Kuppiyawatta East is a surrounded by the Maligawatta East, Maligawatta West, Maligakanda, Borella North, Wanathamulla and Kuppiyawatta West Grama Niladhari Divisions.

== Demographics ==
=== Ethnicity ===
The Kuppiyawatta East Grama Niladhari Division has a Sinhalese plurality (44.5%), a significant Moor population (38.0%) and a significant Sri Lankan Tamil population (14.4%) . In comparison, the Thimbirigasyaya Divisional Secretariat (which contains the Kuppiyawatta East Grama Niladhari Division) has a Sinhalese majority (52.8%), a significant Sri Lankan Tamil population (28.0%) and a significant Moor population (15.1%)

Ethnicity in Kuppiyawatta East
1. Sinhalese (44.5%)
2. Moor (38.0%)
3. Sri Lankan Tamil (14.4%)
4. Other (1.80%)
5. Malay (1.20%)

=== Religion ===
The Kuppiyawatta East Grama Niladhari Division has a Buddhist plurality (42.5%), a significant Muslim population (39.9%) and a significant Hindu population (12.0%) . In comparison, the Thimbirigasyaya Divisional Secretariat (which contains the Kuppiyawatta East Grama Niladhari Division) has a Buddhist plurality (47.9%), a significant Hindu population (22.5%) and a significant Muslim population (17.4%)

Religion in Kuppiyawatta East
1. Buddhist (42.5%)
2. Muslim (39.9%)
3. Hindu (12.0%)
4. Roman Catholic (4.10%)
5. Other Christian (1.40%)
6. Other (0.10%)

== Gallery ==
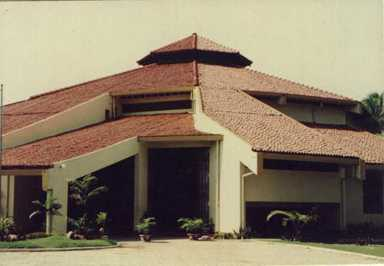
Nalanda College, Colombo

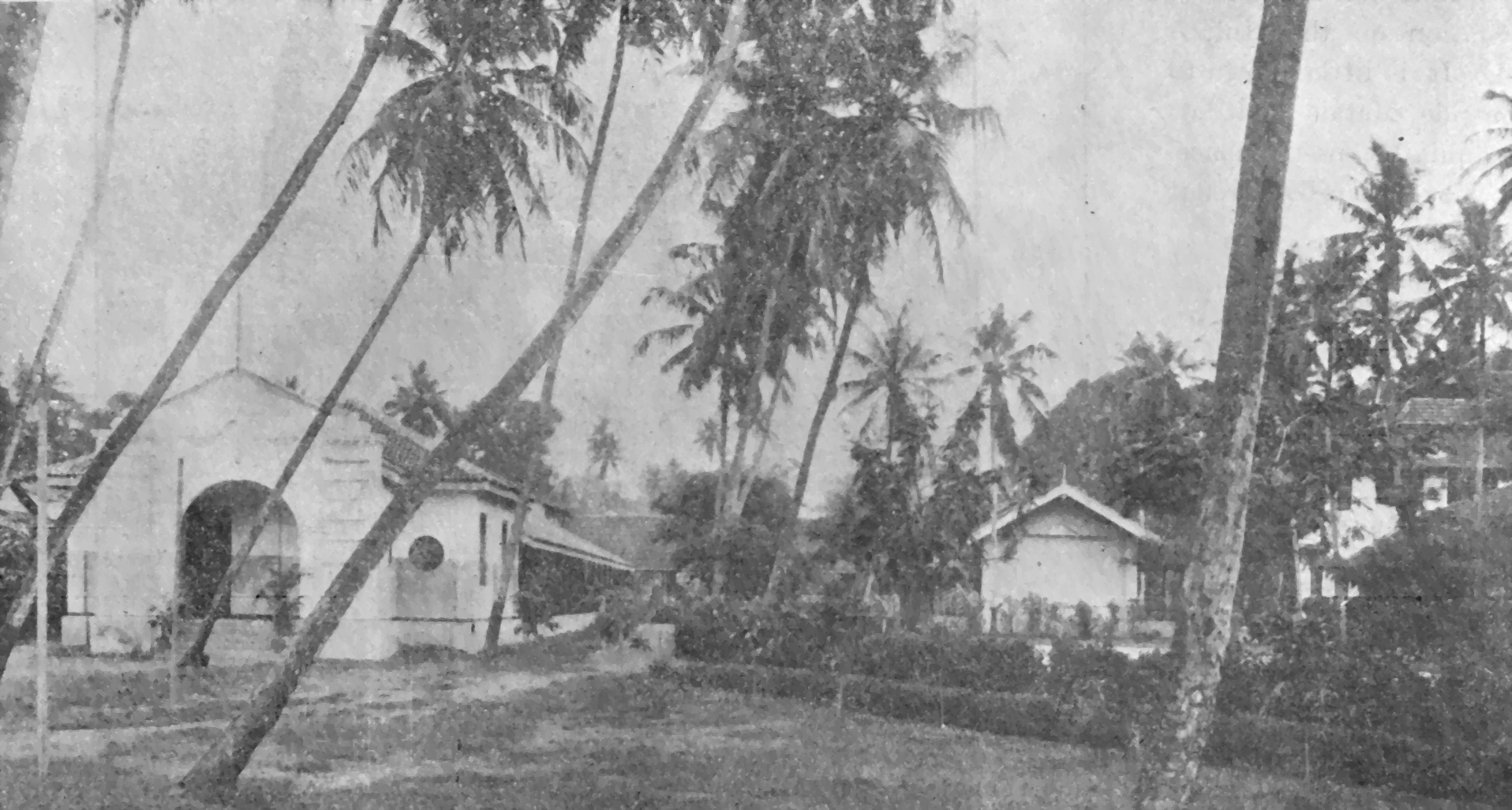
Ananda College

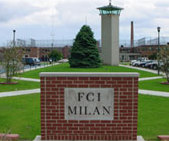
Department of Prisons
