= Kuppiyawatta West Grama Niladhari Division =

Kuppiyawatta West
- Grama Niladhari Division
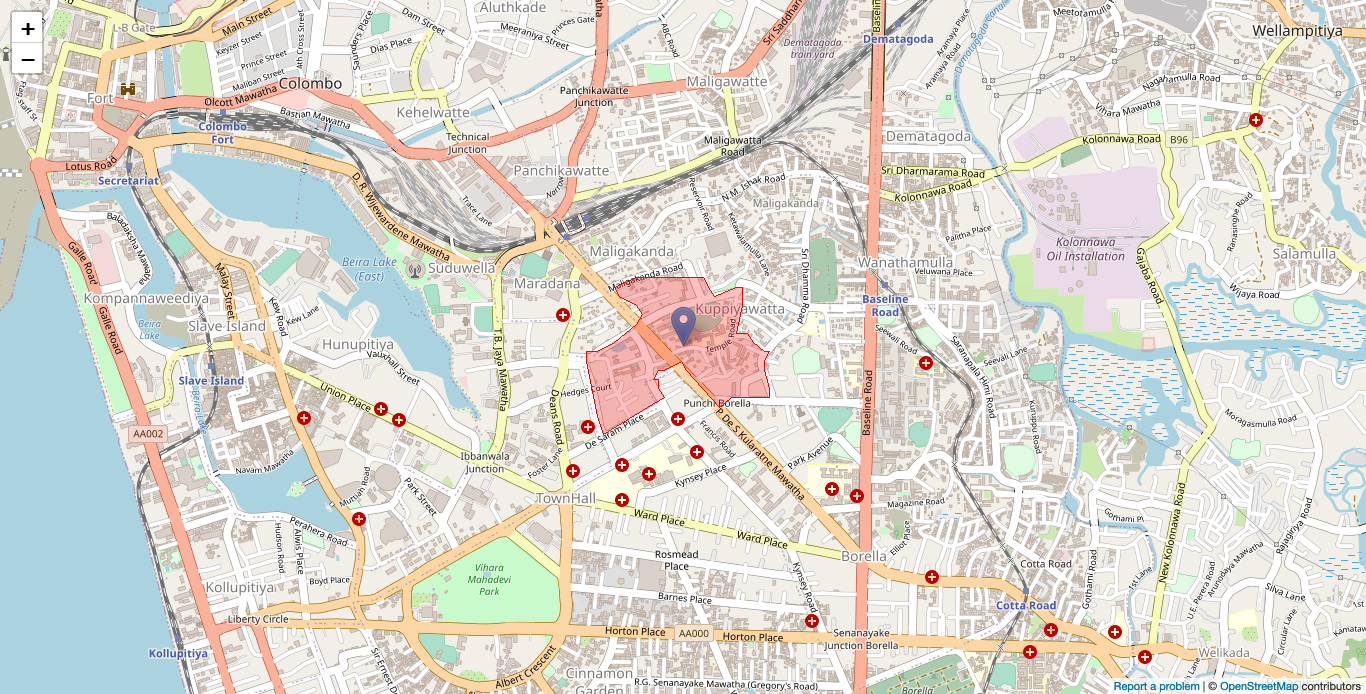
- Kuppiyawatta West Grama Niladhari Division
- Coordinates: 6.923726°N 79.869820°E
- Country: Sri Lanka
- Province: Western Province
- District: Colombo District
- Divisional Secretariat: Thimbirigasyaya Divisional Secretariat
- Electoral District: Colombo Electoral District
- Polling Division: Borella Polling Division

Area
  - Total: 0.4 km^{2} (0.15 sq mi)
- Elevation: 15 m (49 ft)

Population (2012)
  - Total: 6,954
  - Density: 17,385/km^{2} (45,030/sq mi)
- ISO 3166 code: LK-1127020

Kuppiyawatta West Grama Niladhari Division is a Grama Niladhari Division of the Thimbirigasyaya Divisional Secretariat of Colombo District of Western Province, Sri Lanka .

Dharmasoka College, Ananda College, National Hospital of Sri Lanka, Ceylon Medical College, Nalanda College, Colombo, Panchikawatte, Ministry of Health, Nutrition and Indigenous Medicine, Carey College, Colombo, Zahira College, Colombo and Maradana are located within, nearby or associated with Kuppiyawatta West.

Kuppiyawatta West is a surrounded by the Maradana, Ibbanwala, Maligakanda, Borella North, Kuppiyawatta East and Kurunduwatta Grama Niladhari Divisions.

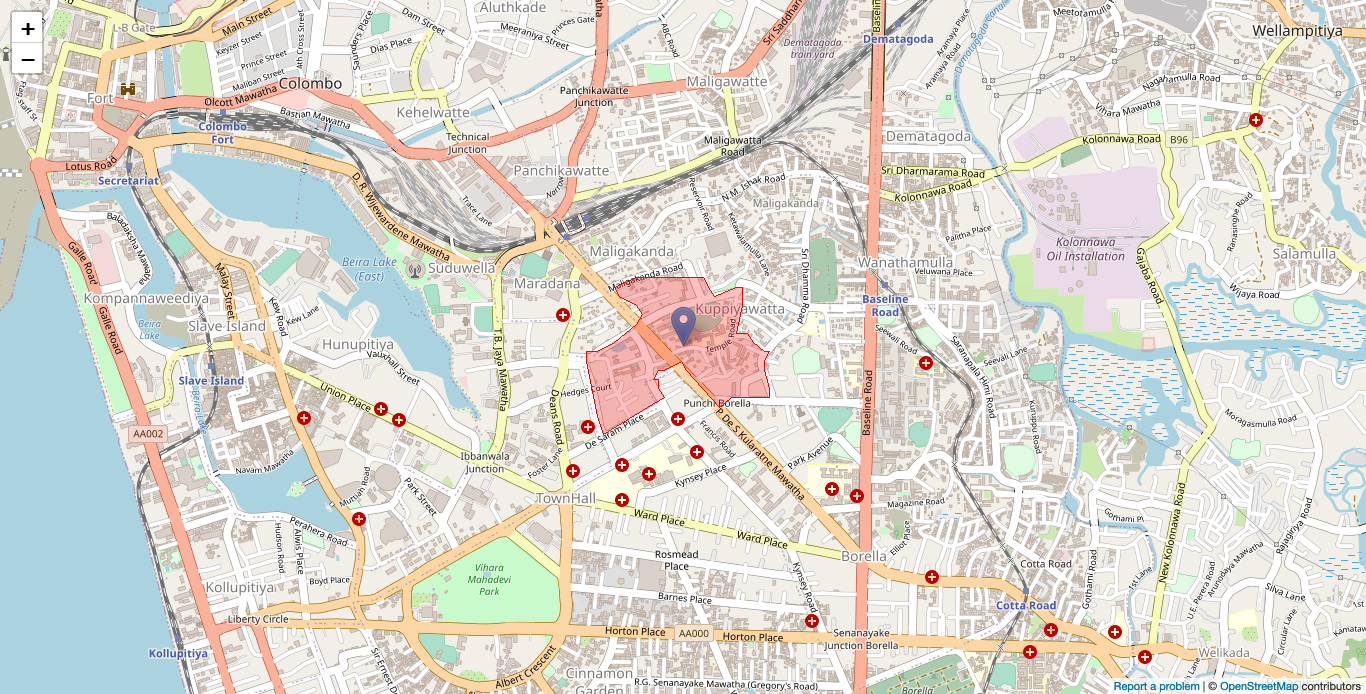
Kuppiyawatta West Grama Niladhari Division

== Demographics ==
=== Ethnicity ===
The Kuppiyawatta West Grama Niladhari Division has a Sinhalese majority (58.3%) and a significant Moor population (32.0%) . In comparison, the Thimbirigasyaya Divisional Secretariat (which contains the Kuppiyawatta West Grama Niladhari Division) has a Sinhalese majority (52.8%), a significant Sri Lankan Tamil population (28.0%) and a significant Moor population (15.1%)

Ethnicity in Kuppiyawatta West
1. Sinhalese (58.3%)
2. Moor (32.0%)
3. Sri Lankan Tamil (7.40%)
4. Other (2.30%)

=== Religion ===
The Kuppiyawatta West Grama Niladhari Division has a Buddhist majority (56.2%) and a significant Muslim population (33.2%) . In comparison, the Thimbirigasyaya Divisional Secretariat (which contains the Kuppiyawatta West Grama Niladhari Division) has a Buddhist plurality (47.9%), a significant Hindu population (22.5%) and a significant Muslim population (17.4%)

Religion in Kuppiyawatta West
1. Buddhist (56.2%)
2. Muslim (33.2%)
3. Hindu (6.00%)
4. Roman Catholic (3.20%)
5. Other Christian (1.40%)
6. Other (0.00%)

== Gallery ==
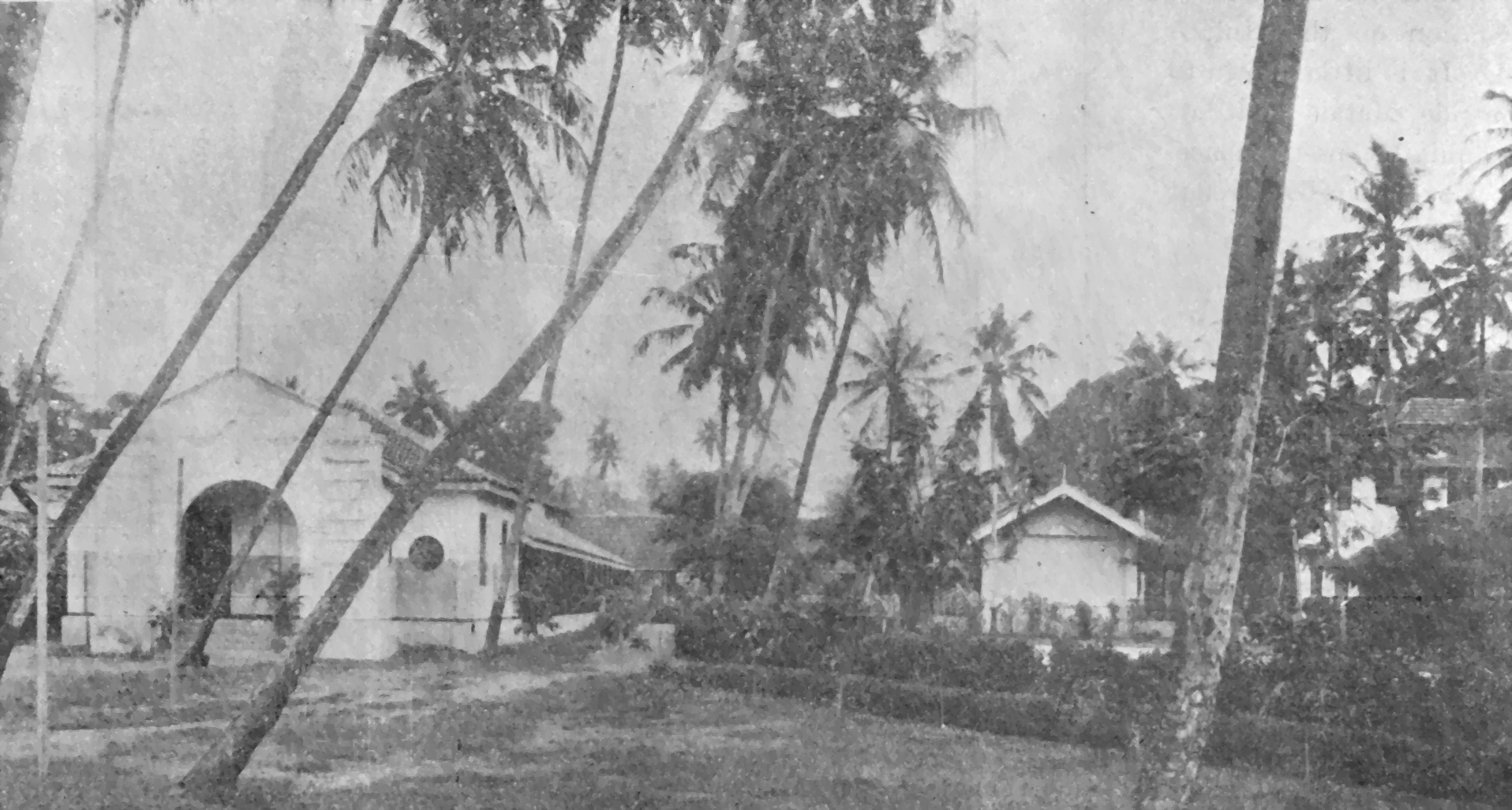
Ananda College

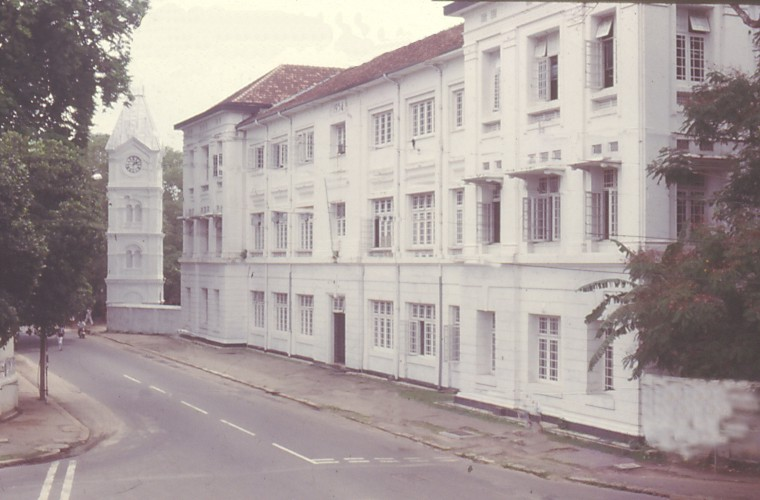
National Hospital of Sri Lanka

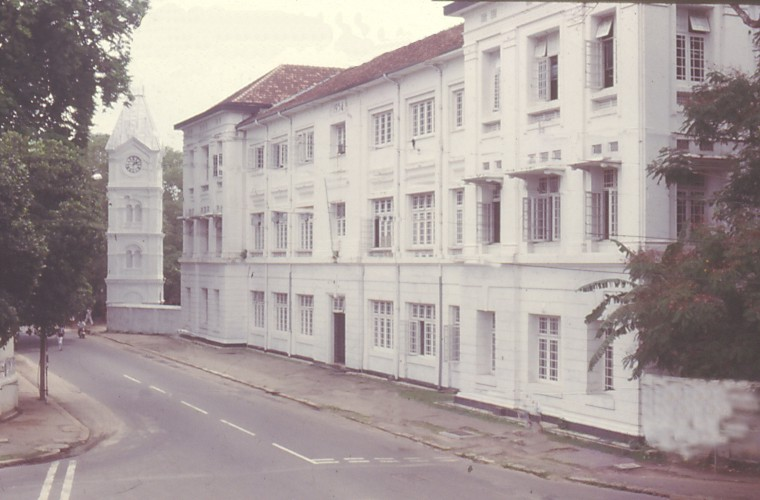
Ceylon Medical College

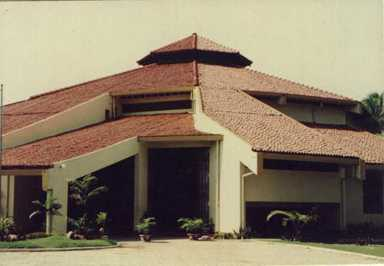
Nalanda College, Colombo

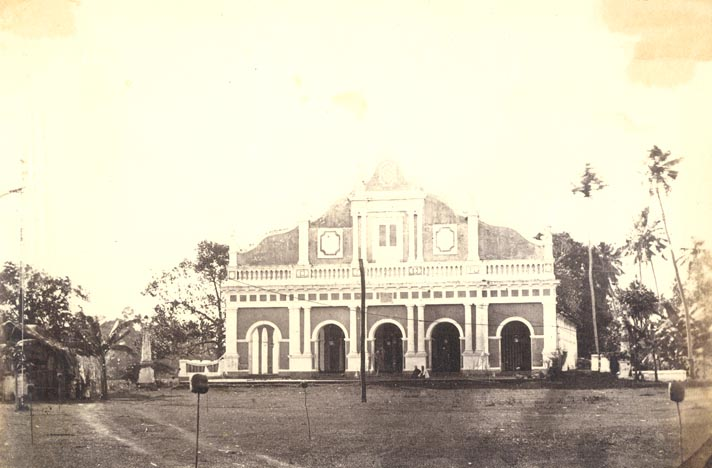
Zahira College, Colombo
