= Milagiriya Grama Niladhari Division =

Milagiriya
- Grama Niladhari Division
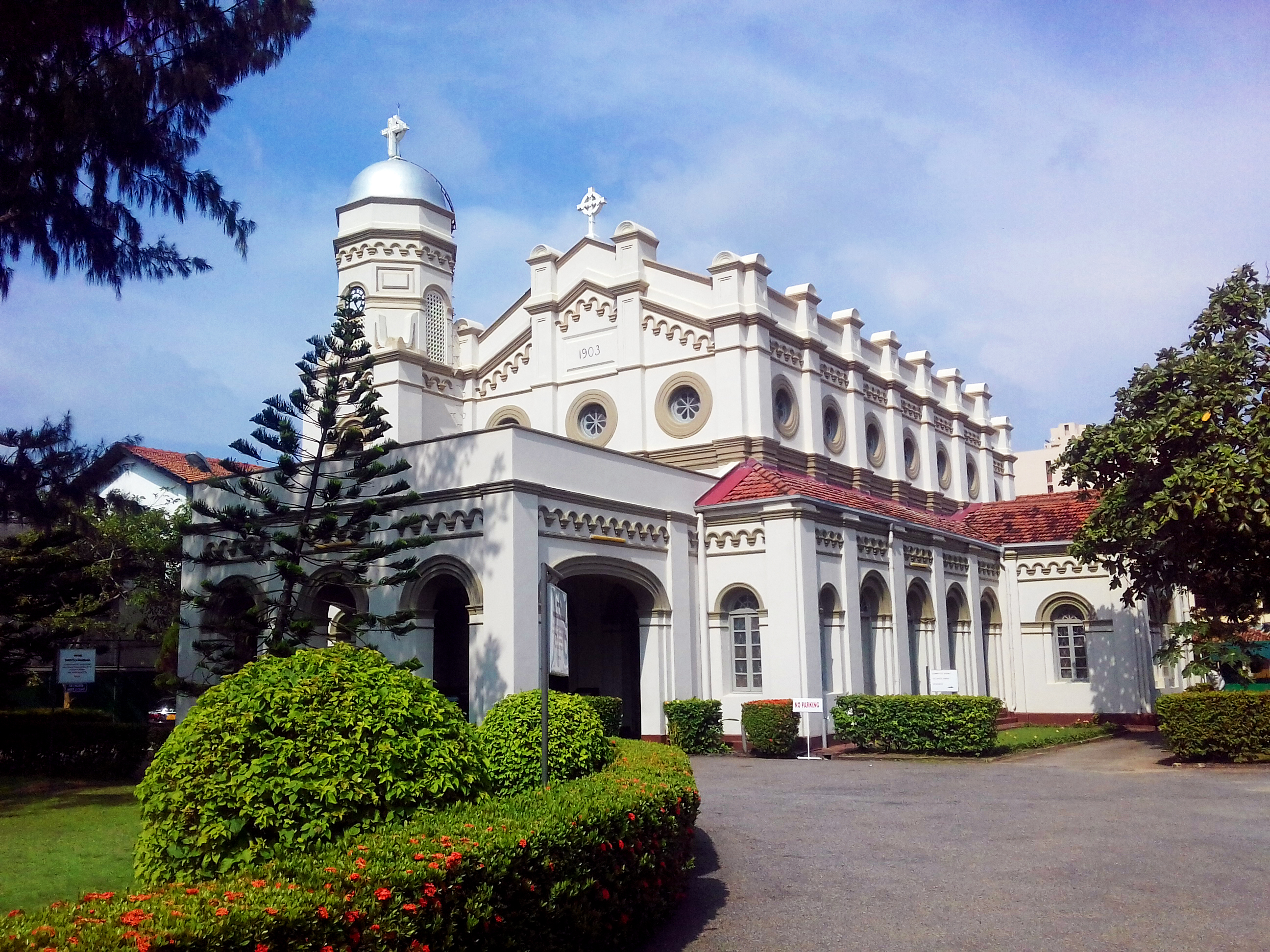
- Milagiriya is located within, nearby or associated with the Milagiriya Grama Niladhari Division
- Interactive map of Milagiriya
- Coordinates: 6.891611°N 79.858144°E
- Country: Sri Lanka
- Province: Western Province
- District: Colombo District
- Divisional Secretariat: Thimbirigasyaya Divisional Secretariat
- Electoral District: Colombo Electoral District
- Polling Division: Colombo West Polling Division

Area
  - Total: 1.22 km^{2} (0.47 sq mi)
- Elevation: 15 m (49 ft)

Population (2012)
  - Total: 7,348
  - Density: 6,023/km^{2} (15,600/sq mi)
- ISO 3166 code: LK-1127065

Milagiriya

Milagiriya Grama Niladhari Division is a Grama Niladhari Division of the Thimbirigasyaya Divisional Secretariat of Colombo District of Western Province, Sri Lanka.

Kirilapone North, Visakha Vidyalaya, Bambalapitiya, Milagiriya, Majestic City, Bodu Bala Sena, Dutch Burgher Union of Ceylon, Sirimavo Bandaranaike Vidyalaya, Saifee Villa and E FM are located within, nearby or associated with Milagiriya.

Milagiriya is a surrounded by the Bambalapitiya, Kurunduwatta, Thimbirigasyaya and Havelock Town Grama Niladhari Divisions.

== Demographics ==
=== Ethnicity ===
The Milagiriya Grama Niladhari Division has a Sinhalese plurality (43.9%), a significant Sri Lankan Tamil population (32.5%) and a significant Moor population (15.6%). In comparison, the Thimbirigasyaya Divisional Secretariat (which contains the Milagiriya Grama Niladhari Division) has a Sinhalese majority (52.8%), a significant Sri Lankan Tamil population (28.0%) and a significant Moor population (15.1%)

Ethnicity in Milagiriya
1. Sinhalese (43.9%)
2. Sri Lankan Tamil (32.5%)
3. Moor (15.6%)
4. Indian Tamil (4.00%)
5. Other (1.90%)
6. Bharatha (1.10%)
7. Other (1.00%)

=== Religion ===
The Milagiriya Grama Niladhari Division has a Buddhist plurality (36.0%), a significant Hindu population (30.6%), a significant Muslim population (17.6%) and a significant Roman Catholic population (10.5%). In comparison, the Thimbirigasyaya Divisional Secretariat (which contains the Milagiriya Grama Niladhari Division) has a Buddhist plurality (47.9%), a significant Hindu population (22.5%) and a significant Muslim population (17.4%)

Religion in Milagiriya
1. Buddhist (36.0%)
2. Hindu (30.6%)
3. Muslim (17.6%)
4. Roman Catholic (10.5%)
5. Other Christian (4.80%)
6. Other (0.40%)

== Gallery ==
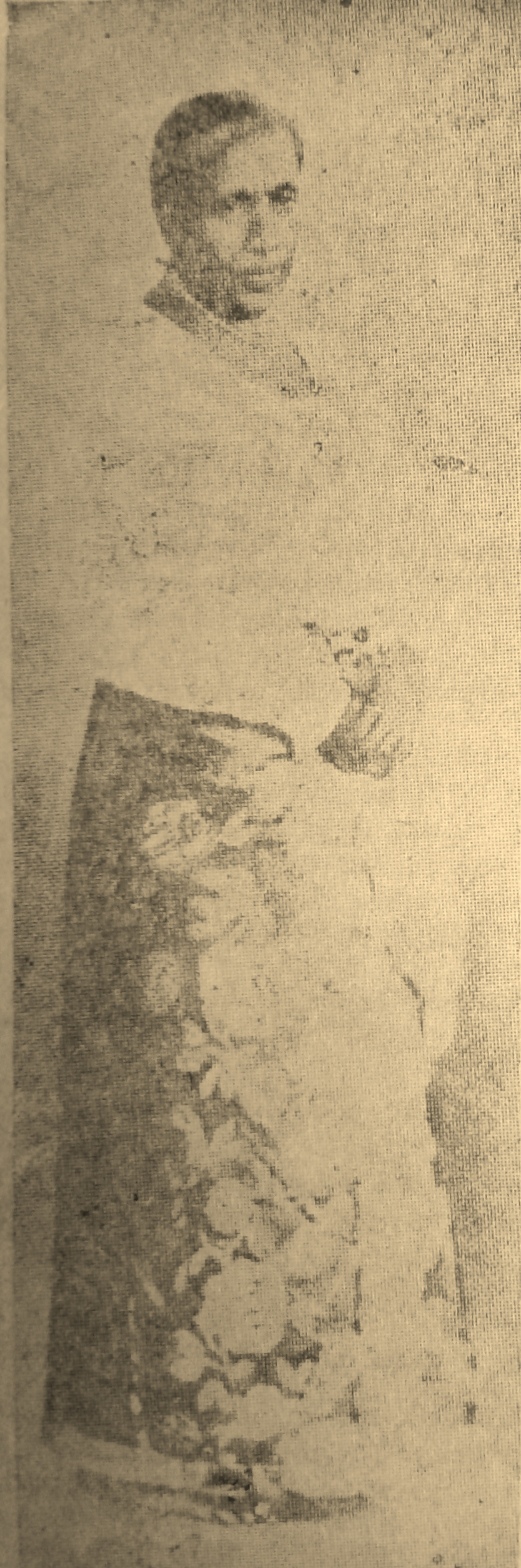
Visakha Vidyalaya

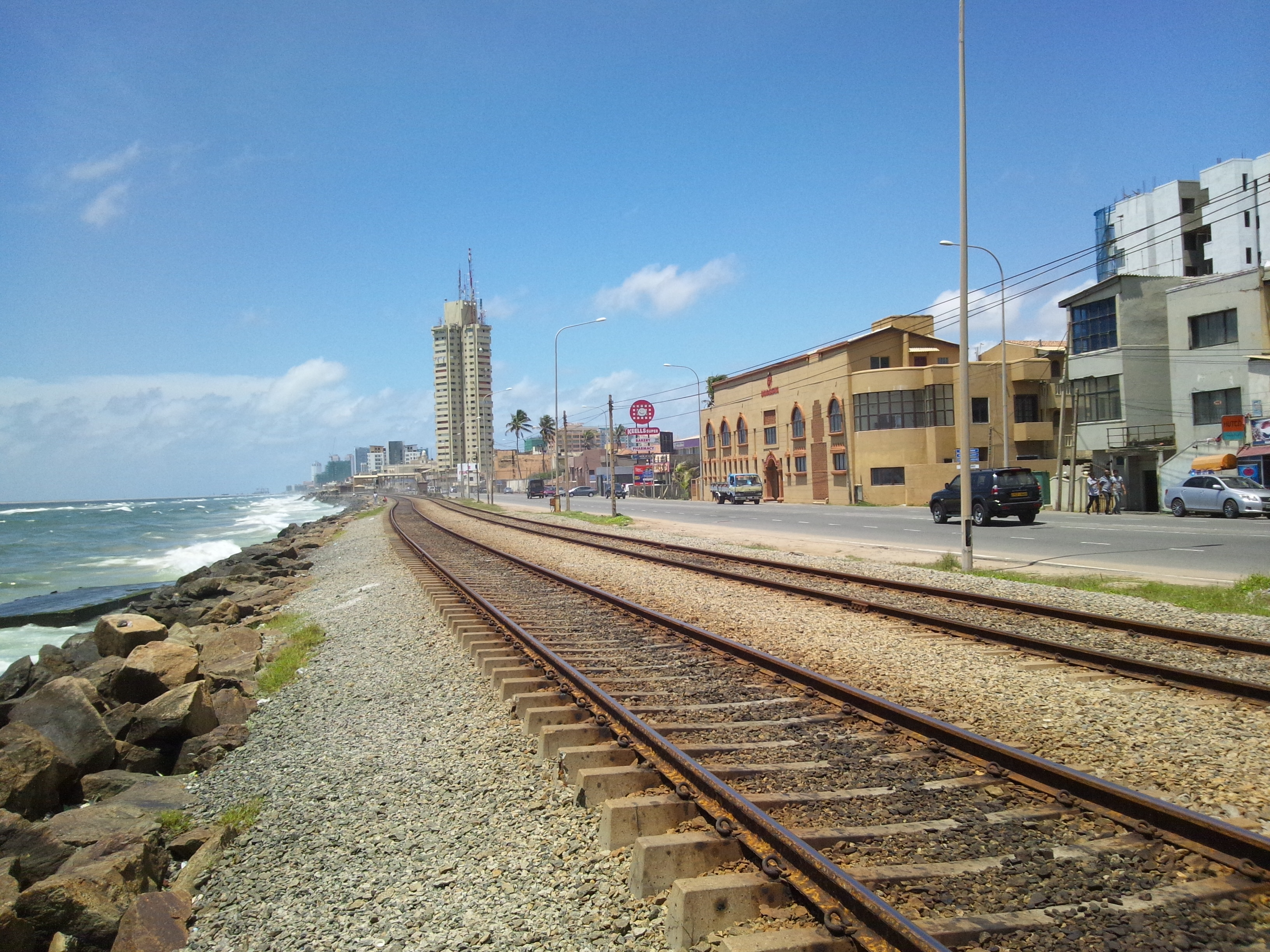
Bambalapitiya

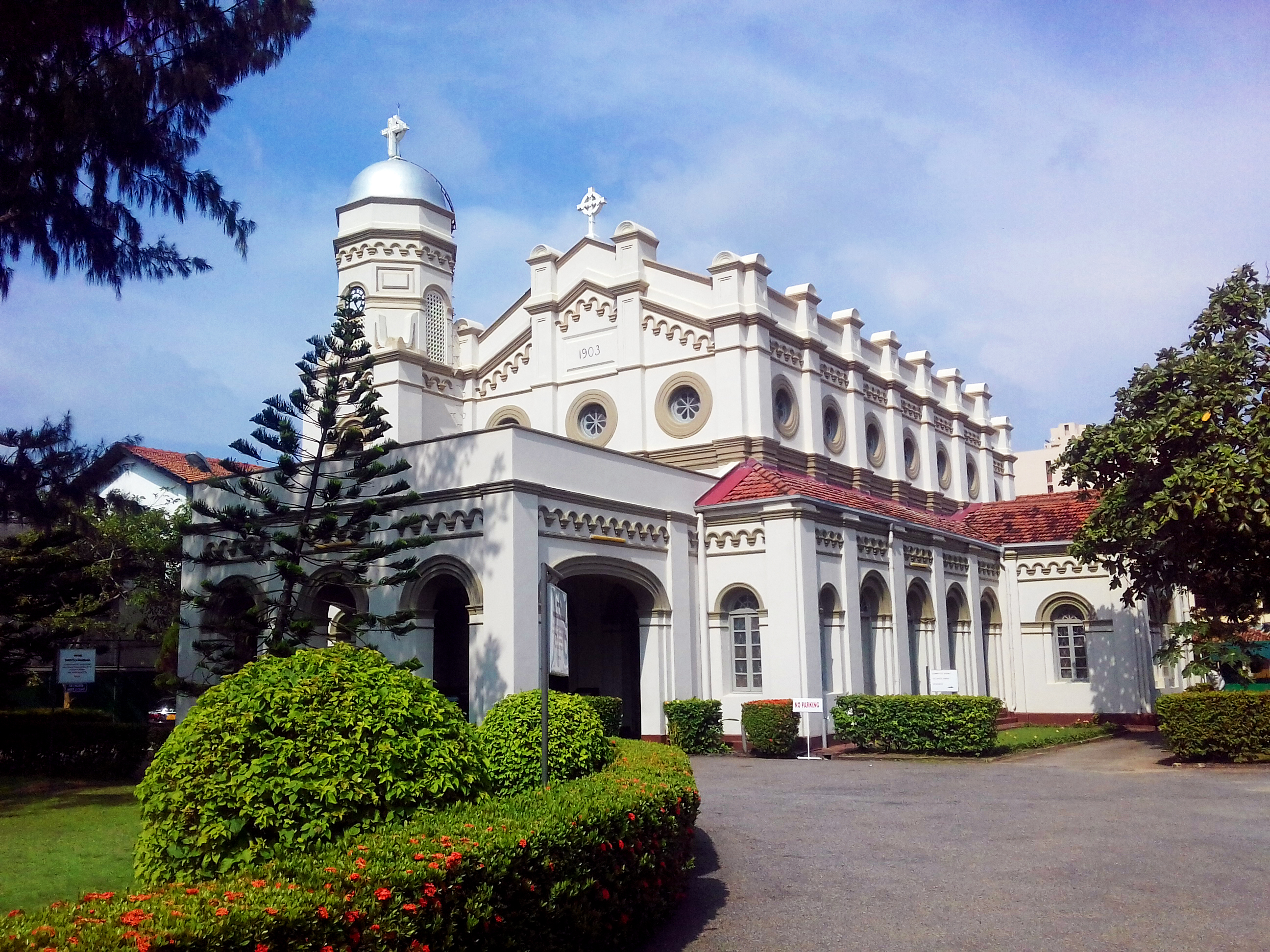
Milagiriya

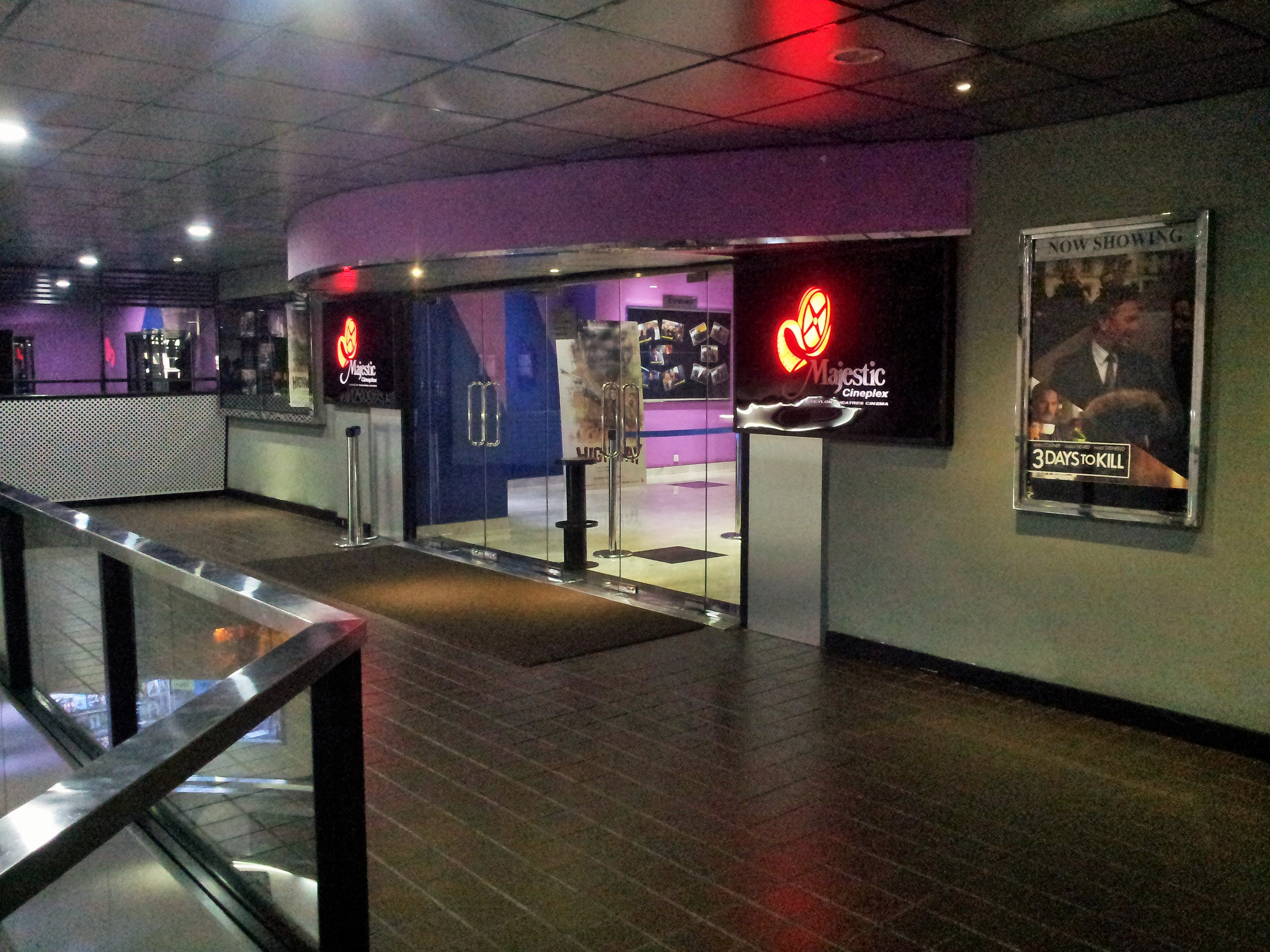
Majestic City

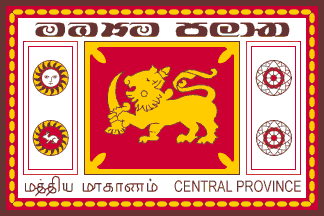
Dutch Burgher Union of Ceylon
