= Havelock Town Grama Niladhari Division =

Havelock Town
- Grama Niladhari Division
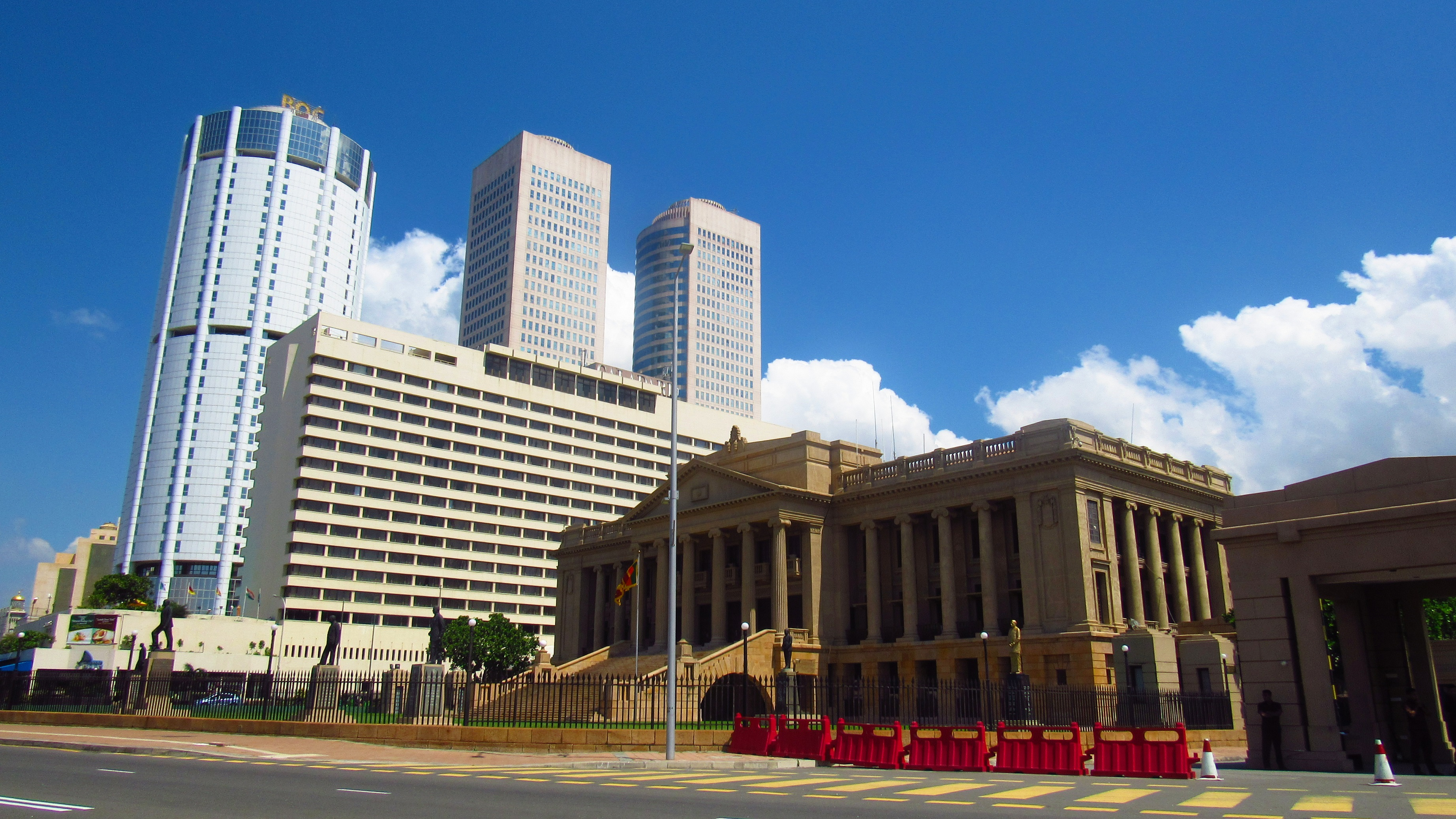
- Havelock Park is located within, nearby or associated with the Havelock Town Grama Niladhari Division
- Interactive map of Havelock Town
- Coordinates: 6.886148°N 79.862488°E
- Country: Sri Lanka
- Province: Western Province
- District: Colombo District
- Divisional Secretariat: Thimbirigasyaya Divisional Secretariat
- Electoral District: Colombo Electoral District
- Polling Division: Colombo West Polling Division

Area
  - Total: 1.47 km^{2} (0.57 sq mi)
- Elevation: 14 m (46 ft)

Population (2012)
  - Total: 7,400
  - Density: 5,034/km^{2} (13,040/sq mi)
- ISO 3166 code: LK-1127070

Havelock Town

Havelock Town Grama Niladhari Division is a Grama Niladhari Division of the Thimbirigasyaya Divisional Secretariat of Colombo District of Western Province, Sri Lanka.

Isipathanaramaya Temple, Colts Cricket Club Ground, Havelock Park, Hejaaz International School, Havelock City, St. Peter's College, Colombo, Isipathana College, Bambalapitiya, Milagiriya and Visakha Vidyalaya are located within, nearby or associated with Havelock Town.

Havelock Town is a surrounded by the Milagiriya, Kirula, Wellawatta North and Thimbirigasyaya Grama Niladhari Divisions.

== Demographics ==
=== Ethnicity ===
The Havelock Town Grama Niladhari Division has a Sinhalese plurality (39.1%), a significant Sri Lankan Tamil population (36.1%) and a significant Moor population (17.7%). In comparison, the Thimbirigasyaya Divisional Secretariat (which contains the Havelock Town Grama Niladhari Division) has a Sinhalese majority (52.8%), a significant Sri Lankan Tamil population (28.0%) and a significant Moor population (15.1%)

Ethnicity in Havelock Town
1. Sinhalese (39.1%)
2. Sri Lankan Tamil (36.1%)
3. Moor (17.7%)
4. Indian Tamil (3.00%)
5. Other (2.00%)
6. Burgher (1.10%)
7. Other (1.00%)

=== Religion ===
The Havelock Town Grama Niladhari Division has a Hindu plurality (33.6%), a significant Buddhist population (30.3%) and a significant Muslim population (20.5%). In comparison, the Thimbirigasyaya Divisional Secretariat (which contains the Havelock Town Grama Niladhari Division) has a Buddhist plurality (47.9%), a significant Hindu population (22.5%) and a significant Muslim population (17.4%)

Religion in Havelock Town
1. Hindu (33.6%)
2. Buddhist (30.3%)
3. Muslim (20.5%)
4. Roman Catholic (9.80%)
5. Other Christian (5.50%)
6. Other (0.30%)

== Gallery ==
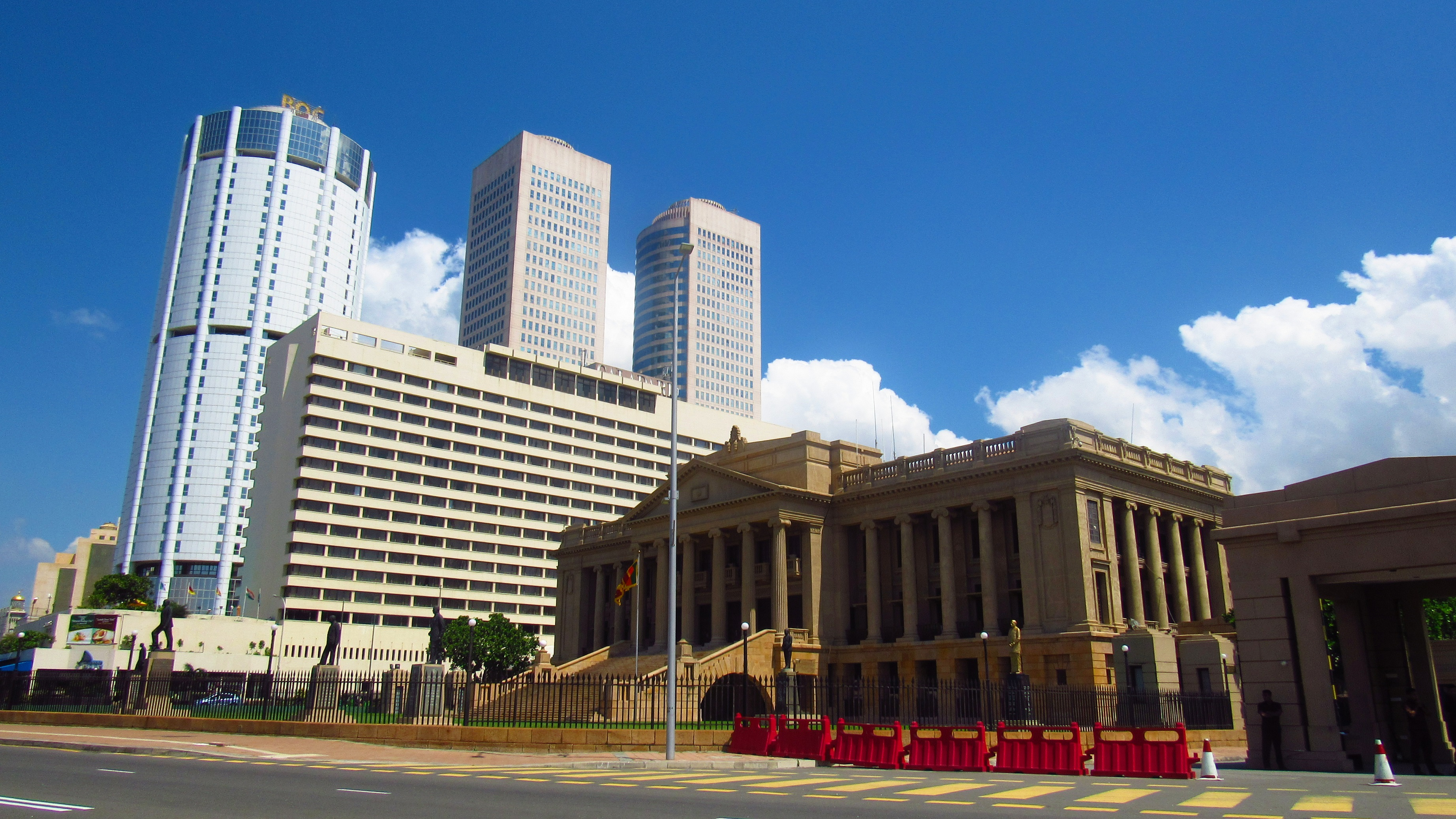
Havelock Park

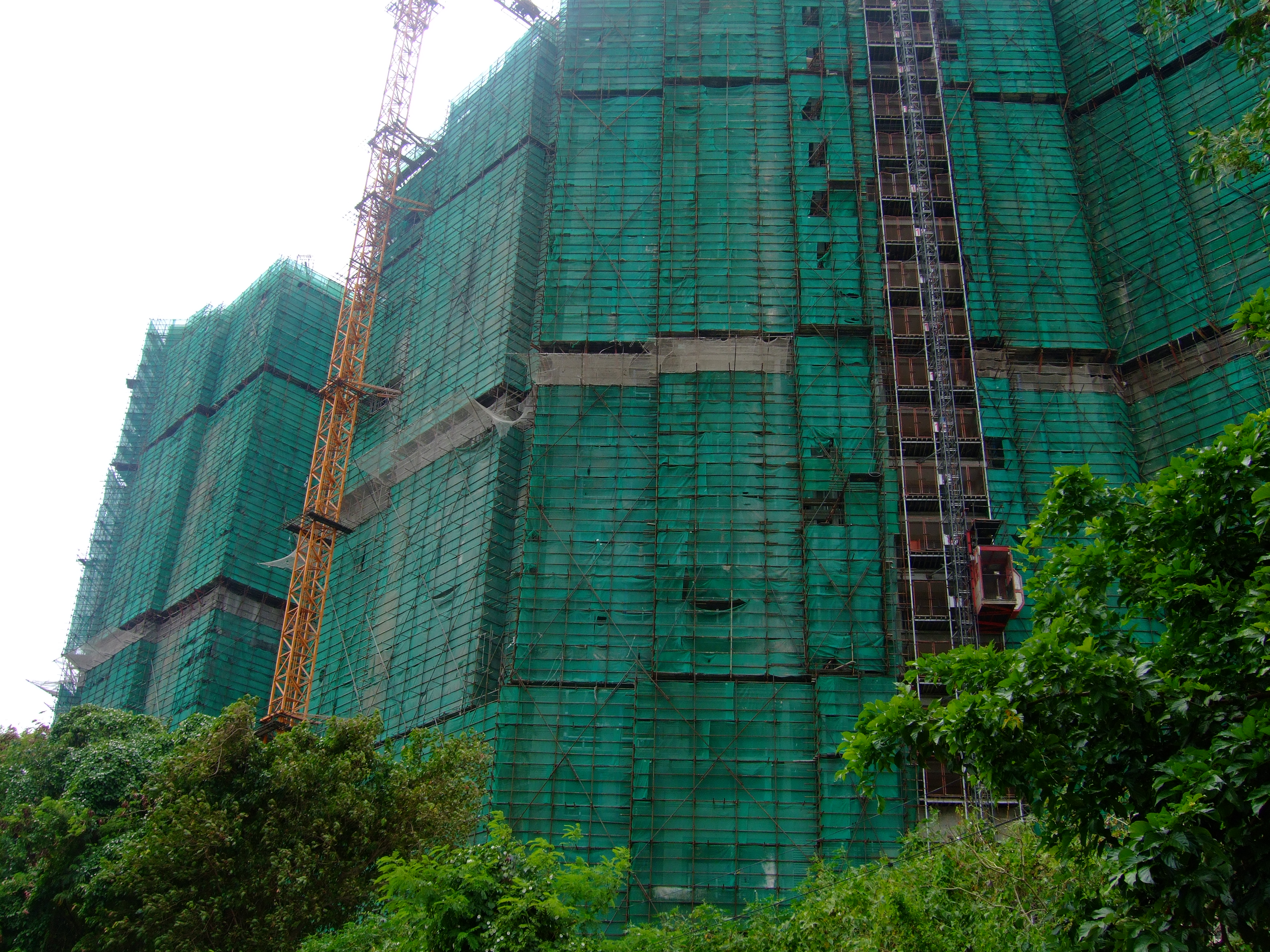
Havelock City

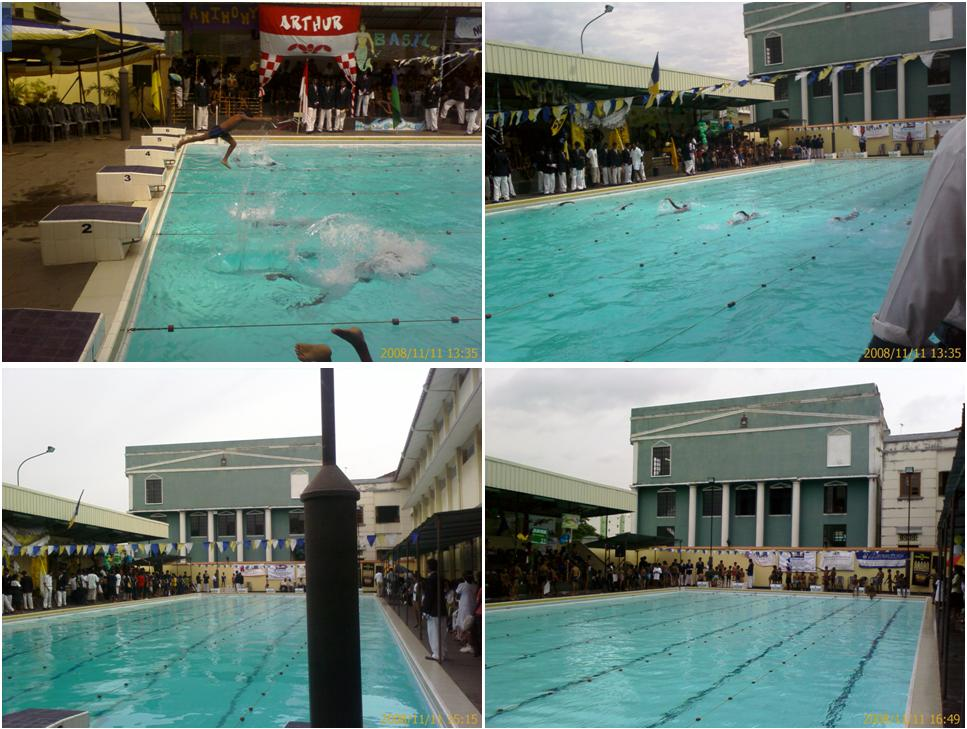
St. Peter's College, Colombo

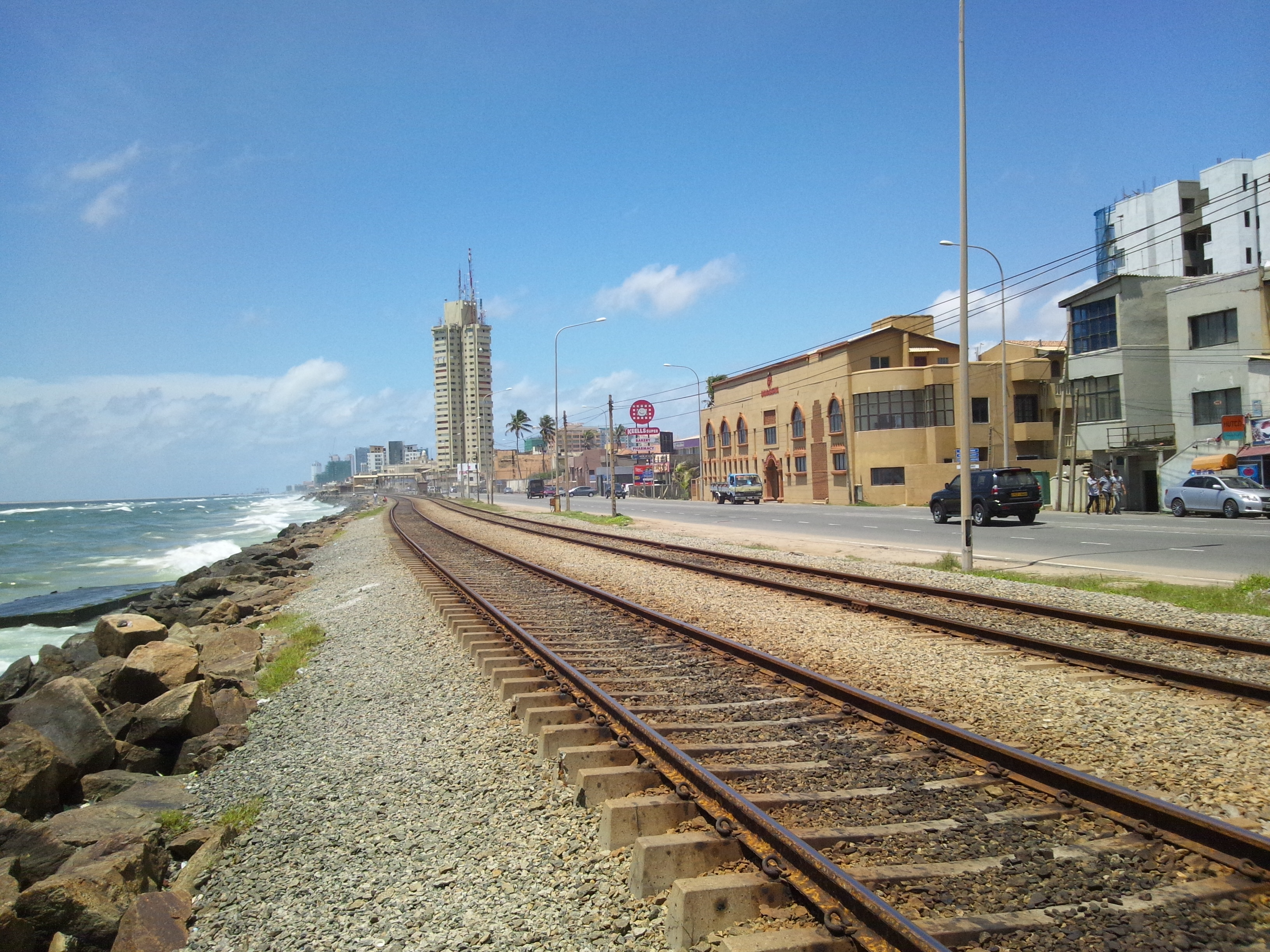
Bambalapitiya

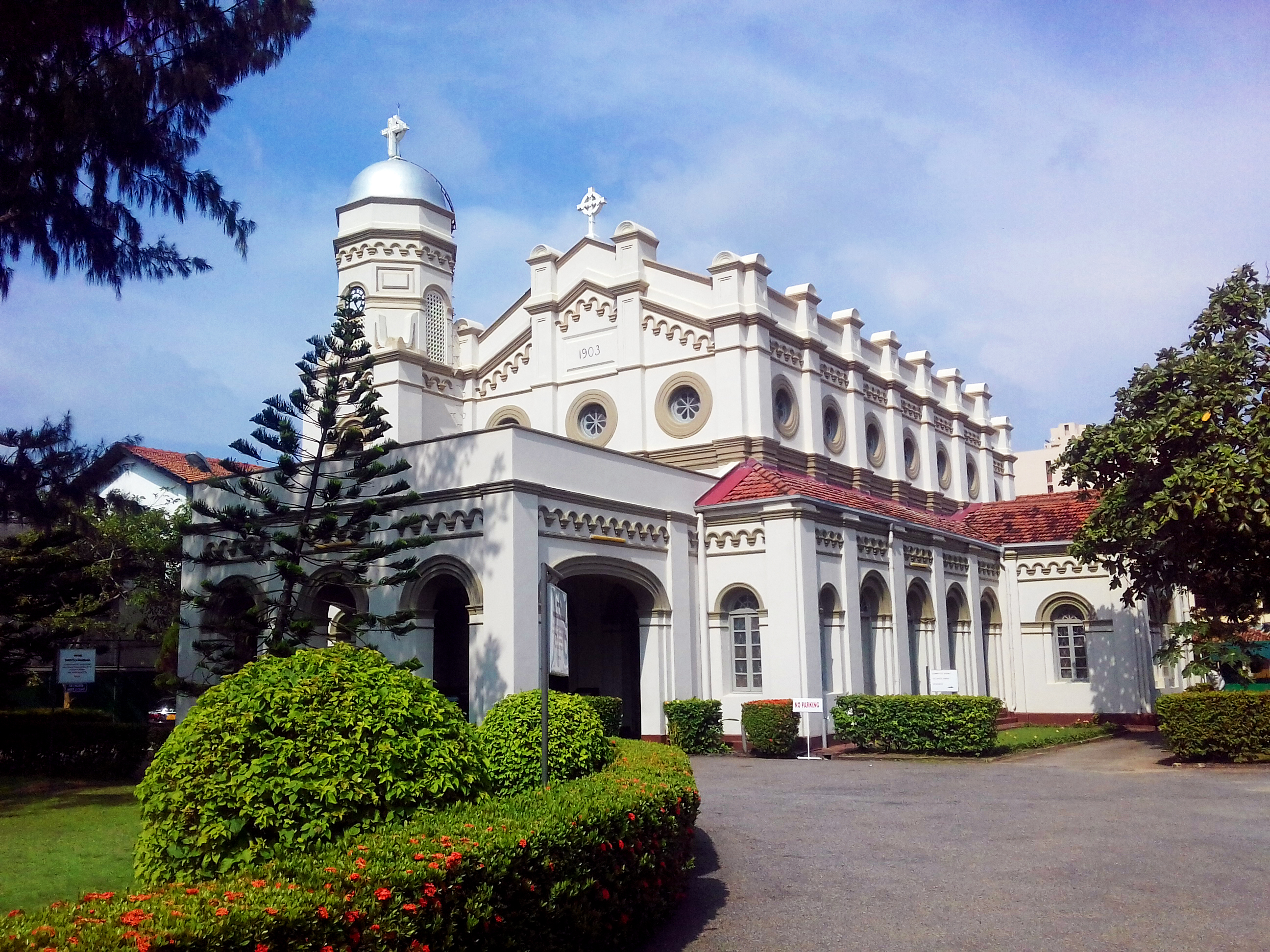
Milagiriya
