= Bambalapitiya Grama Niladhari Division =

Bambalapitiya
- Grama Niladhari Division
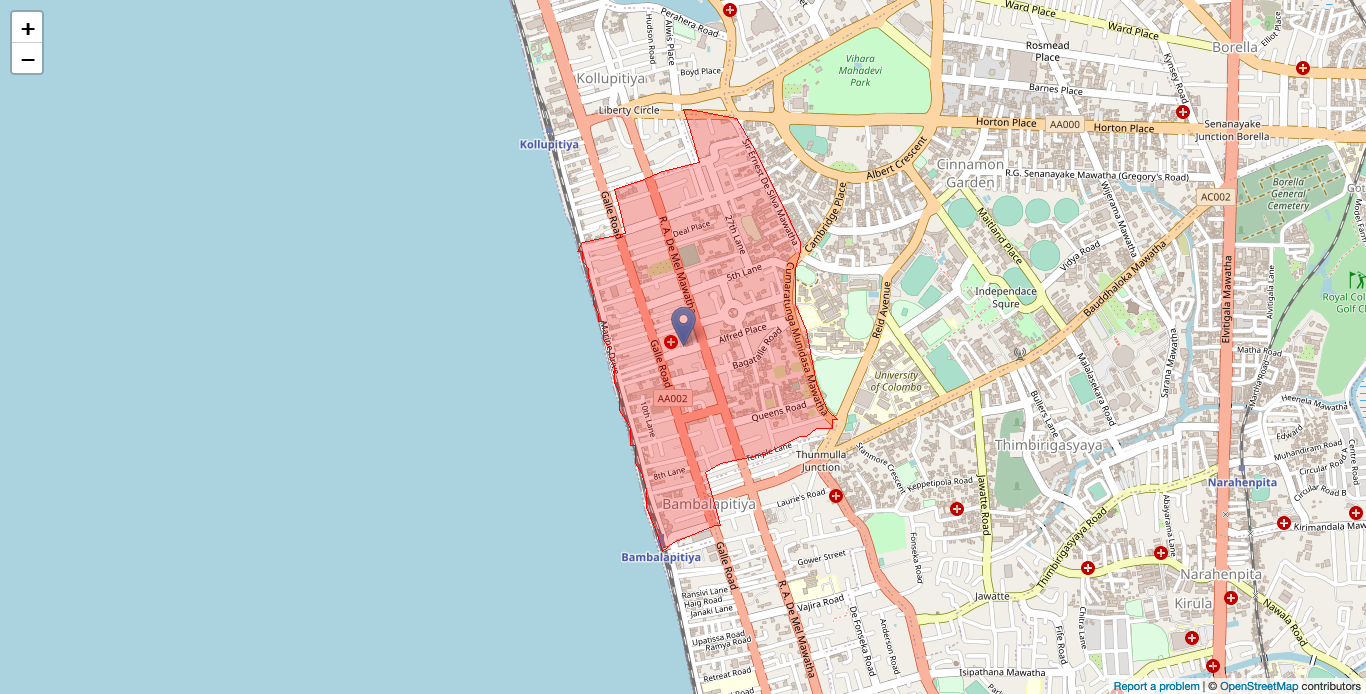
- Bambalapitiya Grama Niladhari Division
- Coordinates: 6.902043°N 79.853911°E
- Country: Sri Lanka
- Province: Western Province
- District: Colombo District
- Divisional Secretariat: Thimbirigasyaya Divisional Secretariat
- Electoral District: Colombo Electoral District
- Polling Division: Colombo West Polling Division

Area
  - Total: 1.64 km^{2} (0.63 sq mi)
- Elevation: 13 m (43 ft)

Population (2012)
  - Total: 7,523
  - Density: 4,587/km^{2} (11,880/sq mi)
- ISO 3166 code: LK-1127010

Bambalapitiya Grama Niladhari Division is a Grama Niladhari Division of the Thimbirigasyaya Divisional Secretariat of Colombo District of Western Province, Sri Lanka .

Kollupitiya, Amana Bank (Sri Lanka), Ministry of Telecommunication, Digital Infrastructure and Foreign Employment, Mahanama College, E FM, Ceylon University College, University of Colombo, Saifee Villa, Navarangahala and Thurstan College are located within, nearby or associated with Bambalapitiya.

Bambalapitiya is a surrounded by the Milagiriya, Kurunduwatta and Kollupitiya Grama Niladhari Divisions.

== Demographics ==
=== Ethnicity ===
The Bambalapitiya Grama Niladhari Division has a Sinhalese plurality (40.5%), a significant Moor population (28.2%) and a significant Sri Lankan Tamil population (21.7%) . In comparison, the Thimbirigasyaya Divisional Secretariat (which contains the Bambalapitiya Grama Niladhari Division) has a Sinhalese majority (52.8%), a significant Sri Lankan Tamil population (28.0%) and a significant Moor population (15.1%)

Ethnicity in Bambalapitiya
1. Sinhalese (40.5%)
2. Moor (28.2%)
3. Sri Lankan Tamil (21.7%)
4. Other (4.00%)
5. Indian Tamil (3.80%)
6. Other (1.80%)

=== Religion ===
The Bambalapitiya Grama Niladhari Division has a Buddhist plurality (32.5%), a significant Muslim population (30.2%) and a significant Hindu population (20.2%) . In comparison, the Thimbirigasyaya Divisional Secretariat (which contains the Bambalapitiya Grama Niladhari Division) has a Buddhist plurality (47.9%), a significant Hindu population (22.5%) and a significant Muslim population (17.4%)

Religion in Bambalapitiya
1. Buddhist (32.5%)
2. Muslim (30.2%)
3. Hindu (20.2%)
4. Roman Catholic (9.10%)
5. Other Christian (7.00%)
6. Others (1.10%)
7. Other (0.00%)

== Gallery ==
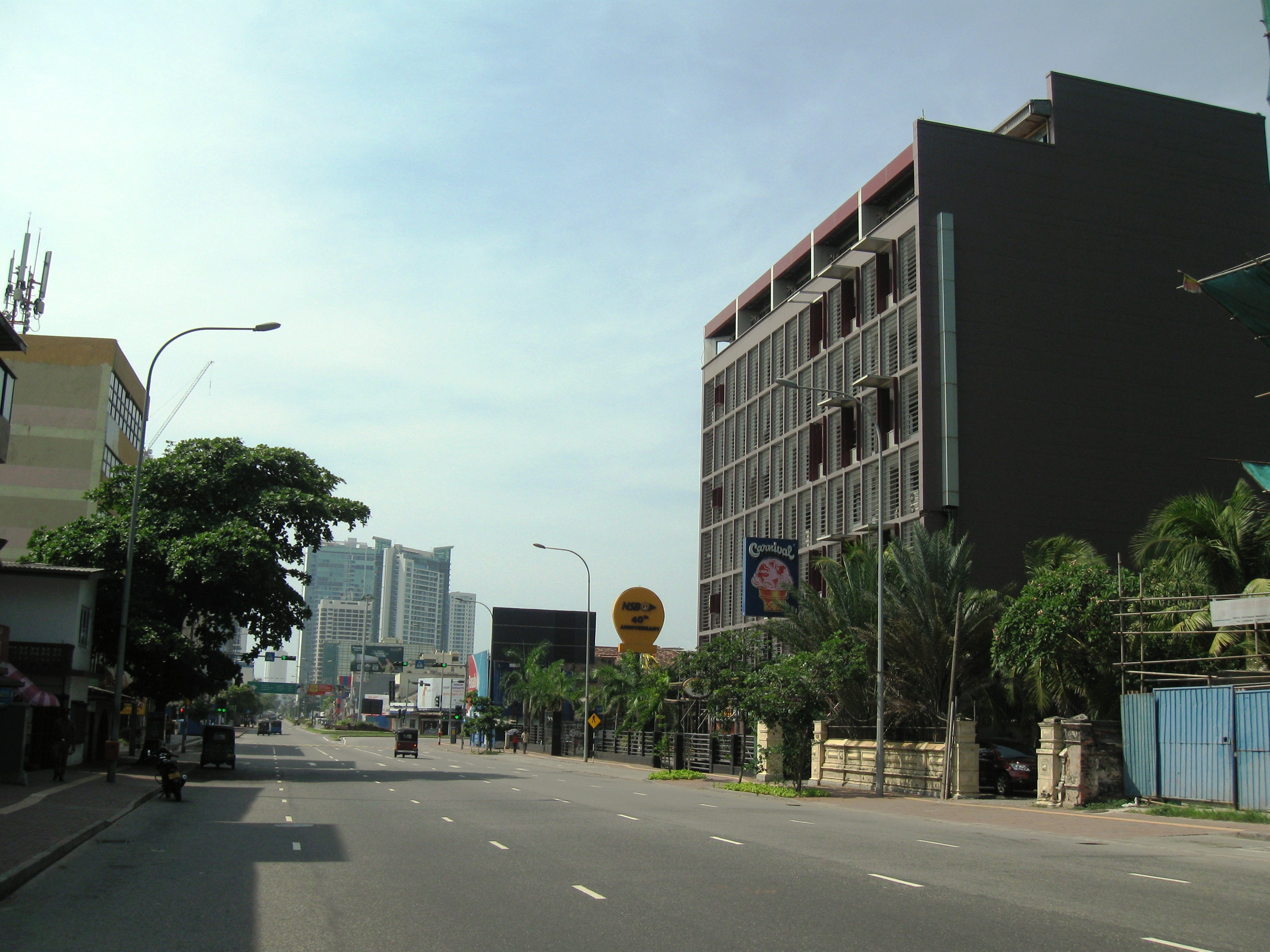
Kollupitiya

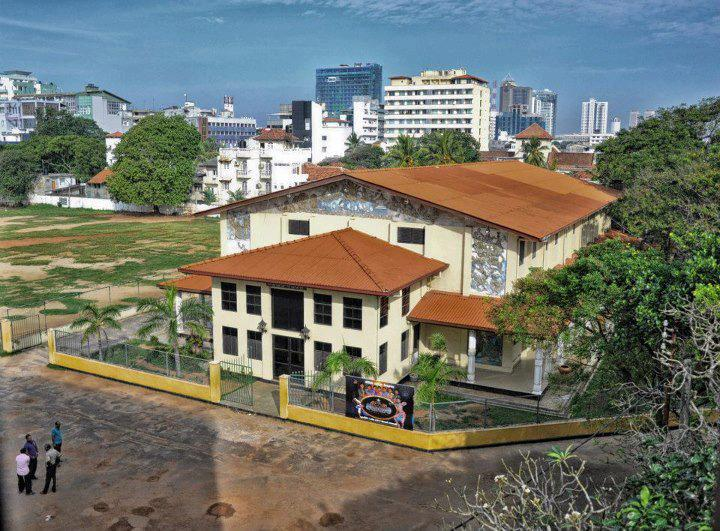
Mahanama College

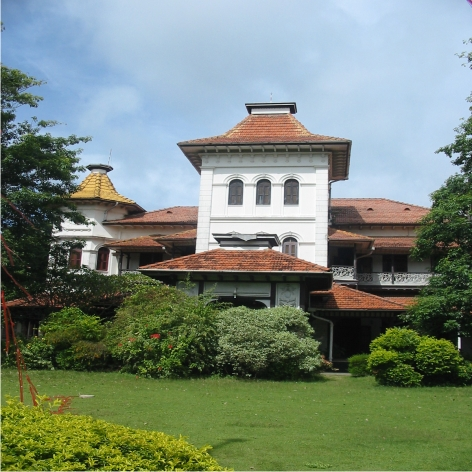
Ceylon University College

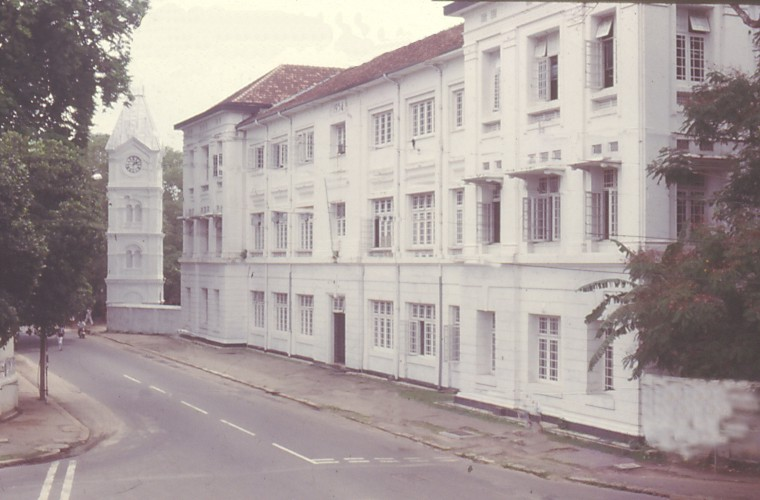
University of Colombo

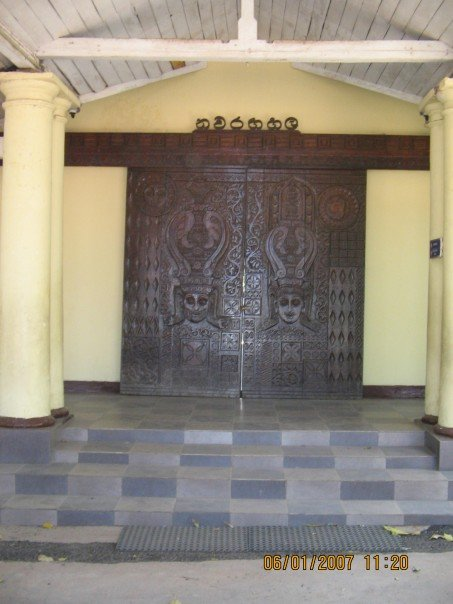
Navarangahala

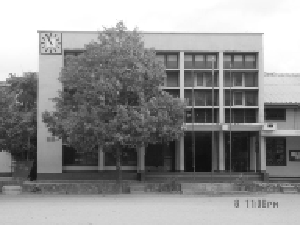
Thurstan College
