= Maligakanda Grama Niladhari Division =

Maligakanda
- Grama Niladhari Division
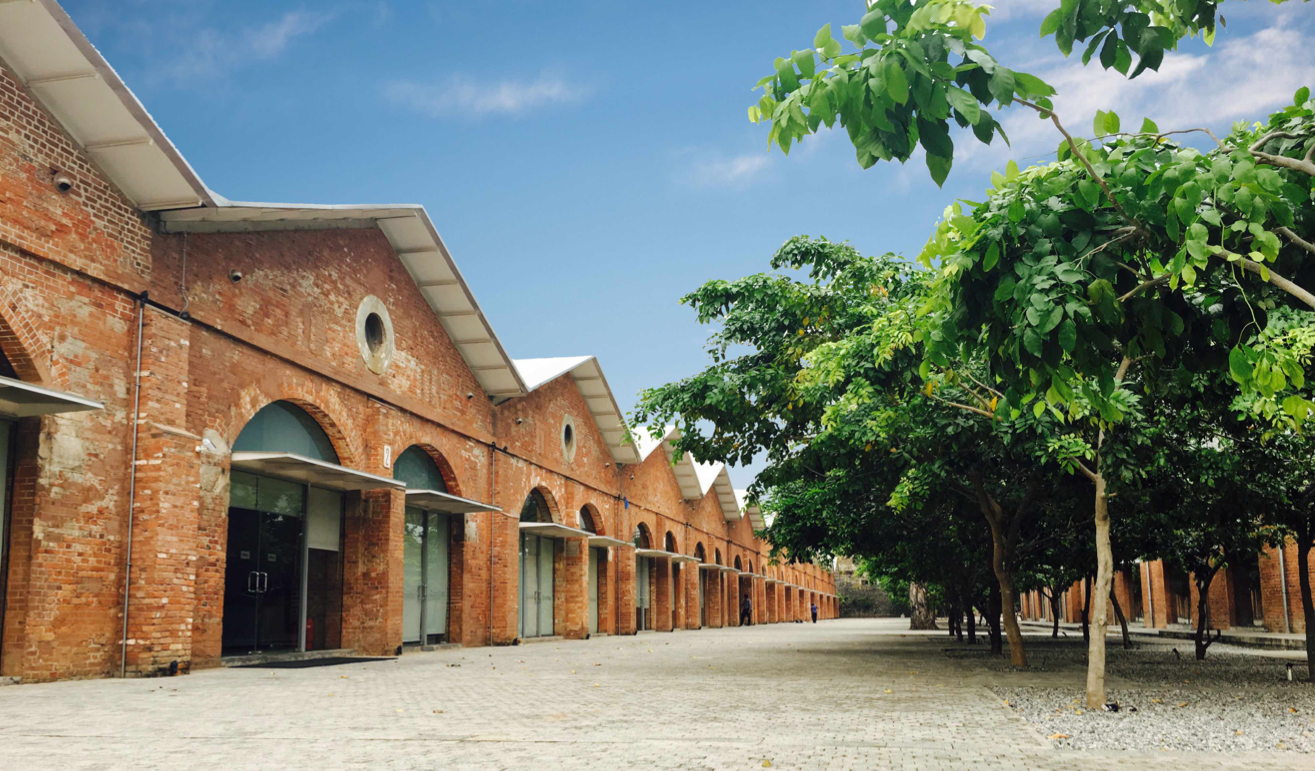
- Trace City is located within, nearby or associated with the Maligakanda Grama Niladhari Division
- Interactive map of Maligakanda
- Coordinates: 6.928199°N 79.868879°E
- Country: Sri Lanka
- Province: Western Province
- District: Colombo District
- Divisional Secretariat: Colombo Divisional Secretariat
- Electoral District: Colombo Electoral District
- Polling Division: Colombo Central Polling Division

Area
  - Total: 0.25 km^{2} (0.097 sq mi)
- Elevation: 35 m (115 ft)

Population (2012)
  - Total: 8,526
  - Density: 34,104/km^{2} (88,330/sq mi)
- ISO 3166 code: LK-1103160

Maligakanda

Maligakanda Grama Niladhari Division is a Grama Niladhari Division of the Colombo Divisional Secretariat of Colombo District of Western Province, Sri Lanka.

Dharmasoka College, Ananda College, Ministry of Fisheries and Aquatic Resources Development, Maradana, Zahira College, Colombo, St. John's College, Colombo, Panchikawatte, Trace City, Nalanda College, Colombo and Sri Lanka Institute of Advanced Technological Education are located within, nearby or associated with Maligakanda.

Maligakanda is a surrounded by the Maradana, Panchikawatta, Maligawatta West, Kuppiyawatta East and Kuppiyawatta West Grama Niladhari Divisions.

== Demographics ==
=== Ethnicity ===
The Maligakanda Grama Niladhari Division has a Moor majority (69.9%) and a significant Sinhalese population (23.2%). In comparison, the Colombo Divisional Secretariat (which contains the Maligakanda Grama Niladhari Division) has a Moor plurality (40.1%), a significant Sri Lankan Tamil population (31.1%) and a significant Sinhalese population (25.0%)

Ethnicity in Maligakanda
1. Moor (69.9%)
2. Sinhalese (23.2%)
3. Sri Lankan Tamil (3.60%)
4. Malay (1.90%)
5. Other (1.40%)

=== Religion ===
The Maligakanda Grama Niladhari Division has a Muslim majority (71.6%) and a significant Buddhist population (23.5%). In comparison, the Colombo Divisional Secretariat (which contains the Maligakanda Grama Niladhari Division) has a Muslim plurality (41.8%), a significant Hindu population (22.7%), a significant Buddhist population (19.0%) and a significant Roman Catholic population (13.1%)

Religion in Maligakanda
1. Muslim (71.6%)
2. Buddhist (23.5%)
3. Hindu (3.10%)
4. Roman Catholic (1.30%)
5. Other (0.60%)

== Gallery ==
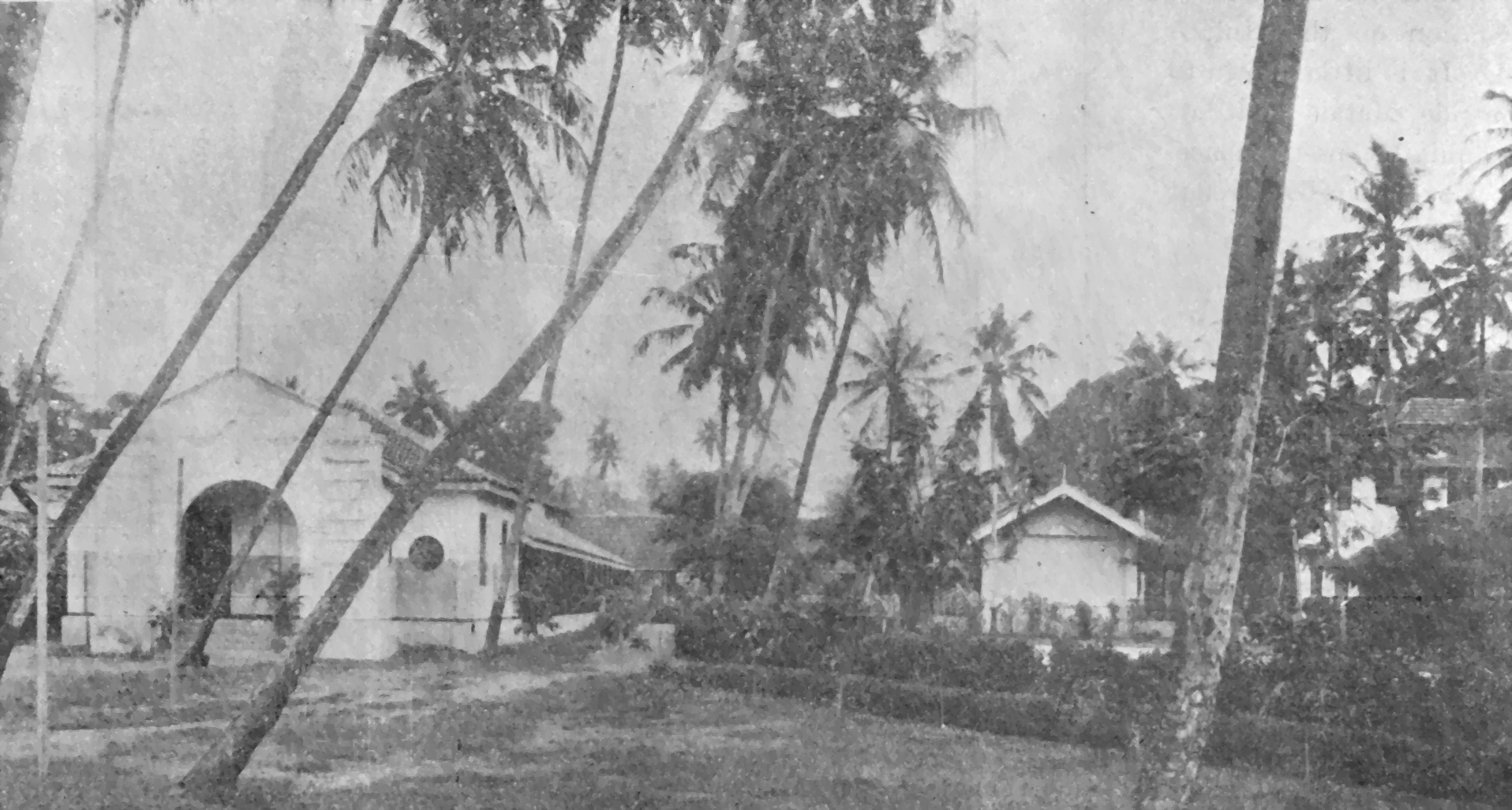
Ananda College

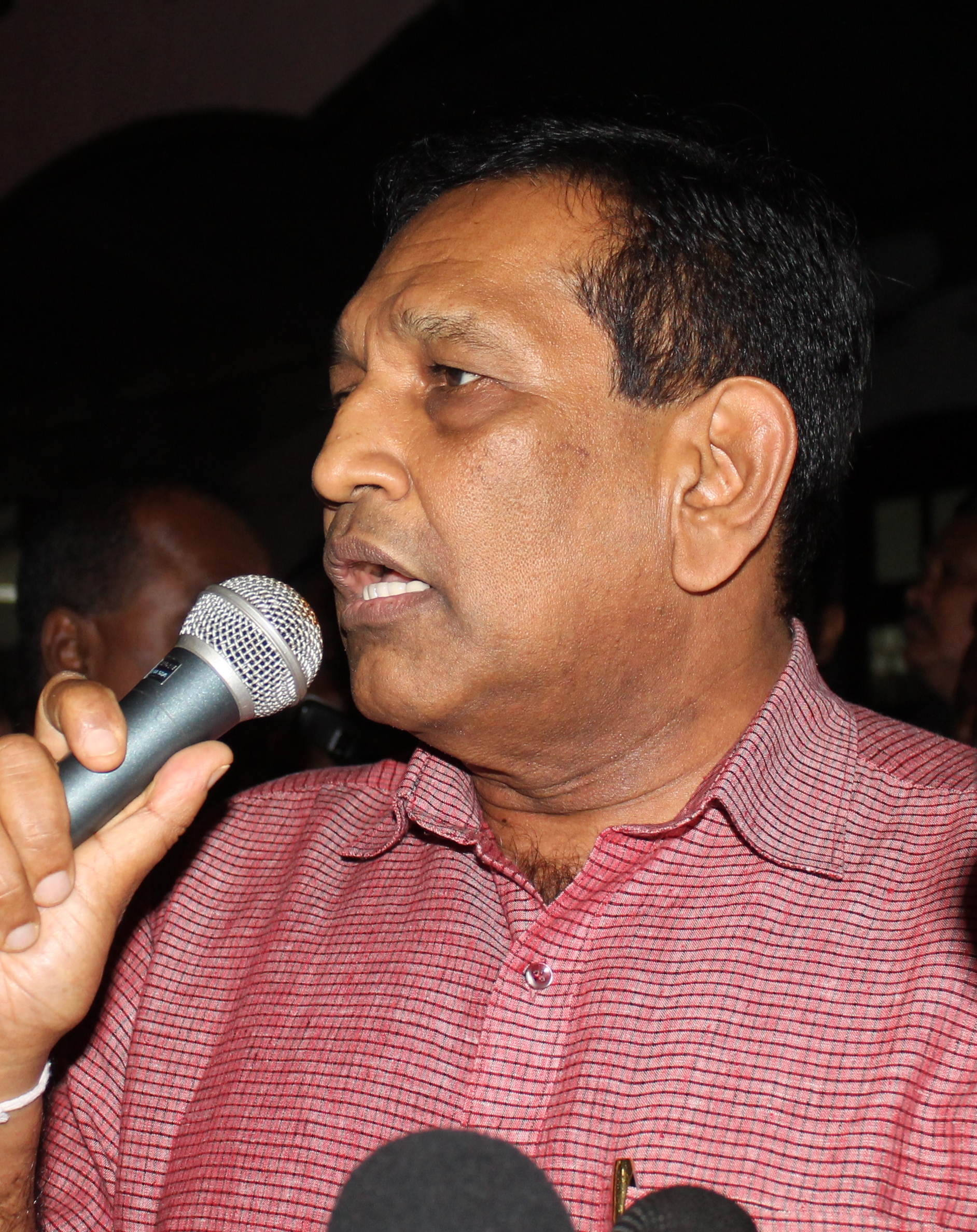
Ministry of Fisheries and Aquatic Resources Development

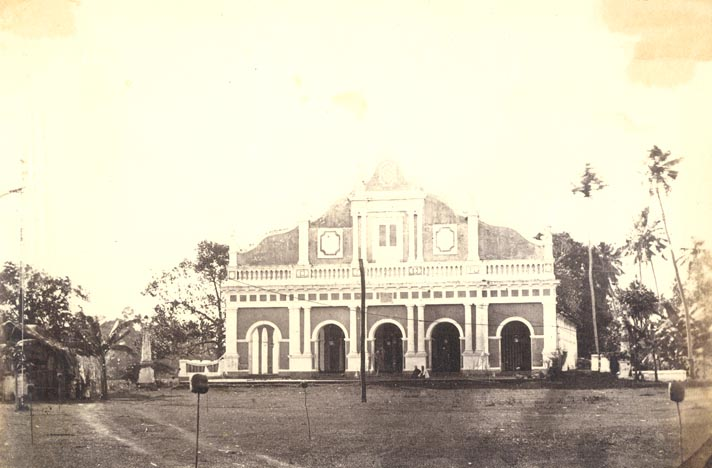
Zahira College, Colombo

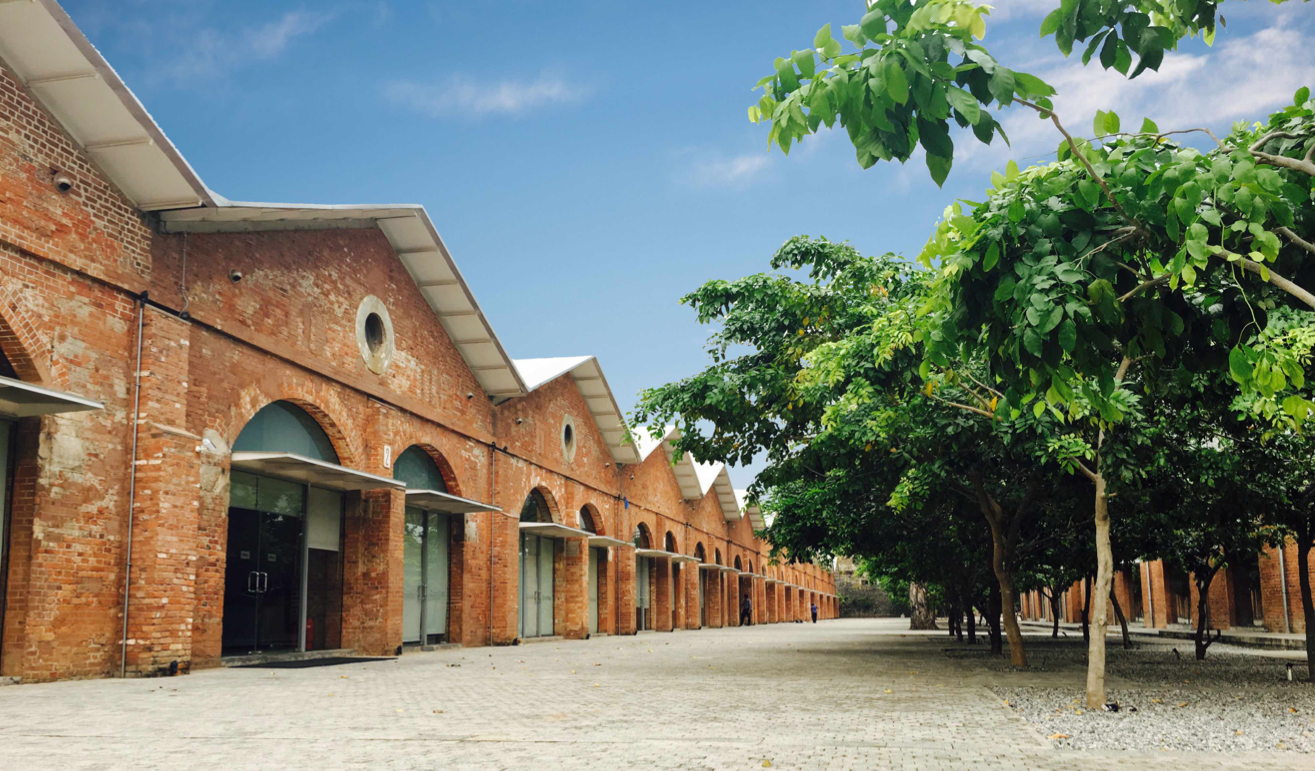
Trace City

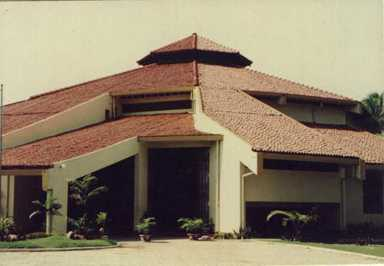
Nalanda College, Colombo
