= Kirulapone Grama Niladhari Division =

Kirulapone
- Grama Niladhari Division
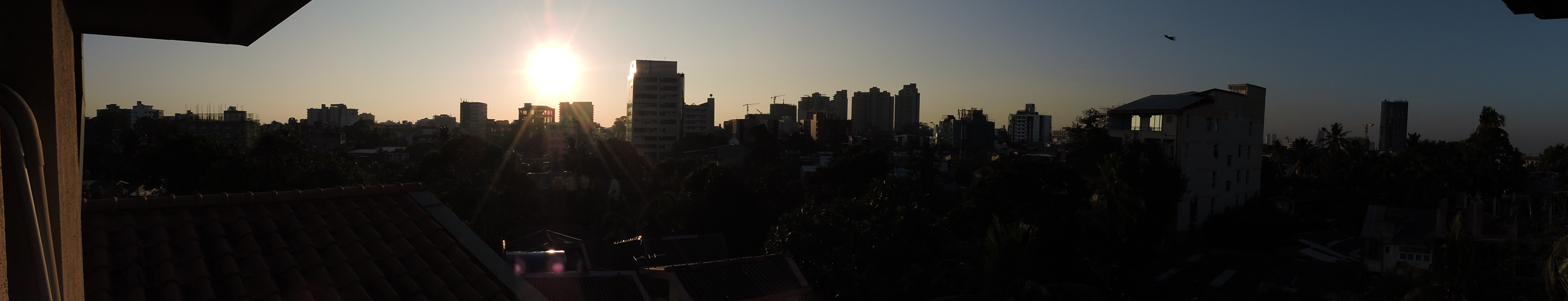
- Kirulapana is located within, nearby or associated with the Kirulapone Grama Niladhari Division
- Interactive map of Kirulapone
- Coordinates: 6.880073°N 79.879759°E
- Country: Sri Lanka
- Province: Western Province
- District: Colombo District
- Divisional Secretariat: Thimbirigasyaya Divisional Secretariat
- Electoral District: Colombo Electoral District
- Polling Division: Colombo East Polling Division

Area
  - Total: 1.5 km^{2} (0.58 sq mi)
- Elevation: 26 m (85 ft)

Population (2012)
  - Total: 17,846
  - Density: 11,897/km^{2} (30,810/sq mi)
- ISO 3166 code: LK-1127080

Kirulapone

Kirulapone Grama Niladhari Division is a Grama Niladhari Division of the Thimbirigasyaya Divisional Secretariat of Colombo District of Western Province, Sri Lanka.

Kalubowila, Pamankada, Kirulapana, Kohuwala, Balapokuna Raja Maha Vihara and Dehiwala-Mount Lavinia are located within, nearby or associated with Kirulapone.

Kirulapone is a surrounded by the Pamankada East, Dutugemunu, Nugegoda West, Kirula and Wellawatta North Grama Niladhari Divisions.

== Demographics ==
=== Ethnicity ===
The Kirulapone Grama Niladhari Division has a Sinhalese majority (57.0%) and a significant Sri Lankan Tamil population (31.0%). In comparison, the Thimbirigasyaya Divisional Secretariat (which contains the Kirulapone Grama Niladhari Division) has a Sinhalese majority (52.8%), a significant Sri Lankan Tamil population (28.0%) and a significant Moor population (15.1%)

Ethnicity in Kirulapone
1. Sinhalese (57.0%)
2. Sri Lankan Tamil (31.0%)
3. Moor (8.60%)
4. Indian Tamil (2.00%)
5. Other (1.40%)

=== Religion ===
The Kirulapone Grama Niladhari Division has a Buddhist majority (52.2%), a significant Hindu population (22.6%) and a significant Muslim population (10.1%). In comparison, the Thimbirigasyaya Divisional Secretariat (which contains the Kirulapone Grama Niladhari Division) has a Buddhist plurality (47.9%), a significant Hindu population (22.5%) and a significant Muslim population (17.4%)

Religion in Kirulapone
1. Buddhist (52.2%)
2. Hindu (22.6%)
3. Muslim (10.1%)
4. Roman Catholic (7.90%)
5. Other Christian (7.00%)
6. Other (0.10%)

== Gallery ==
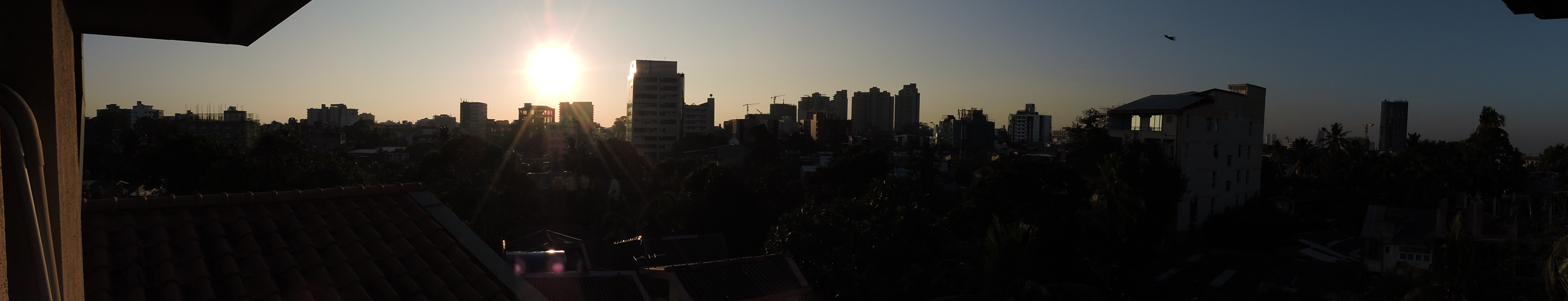
Kirulapana

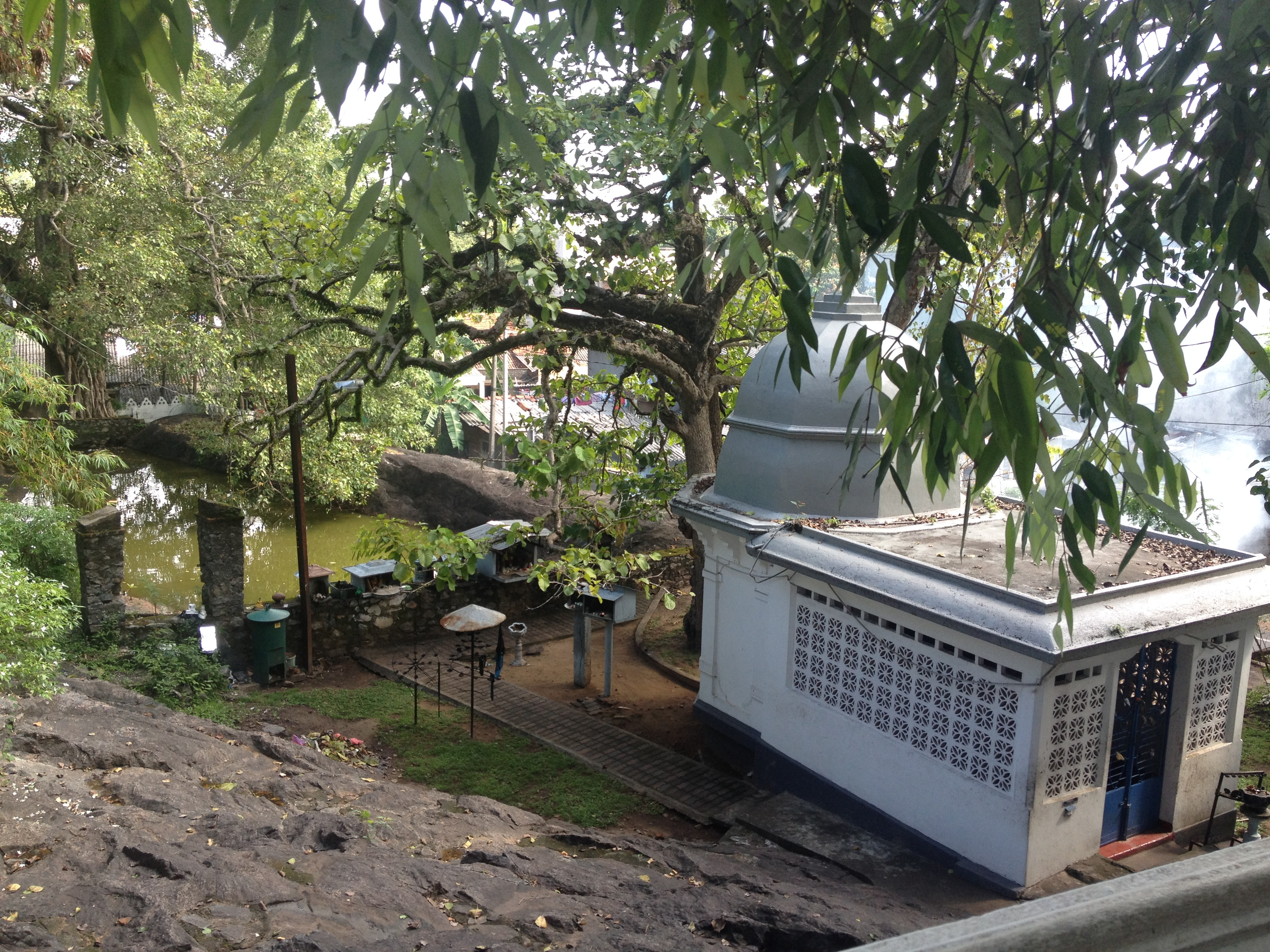
Balapokuna Raja Maha Vihara

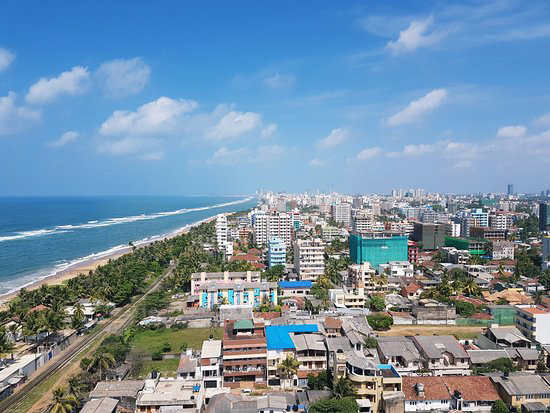
Dehiwala-Mount Lavinia
