= Kollupitiya Grama Niladhari Division =

Kollupitiya
- Grama Niladhari Division
- Interactive map of Kollupitiya
- Coordinates: 6.914881°N 79.849623°E
- Country: Sri Lanka
- Province: Western Province
- District: Colombo District
- Divisional Secretariat: Thimbirigasyaya Divisional Secretariat
- Electoral District: Colombo Electoral District
- Polling Division: Colombo West Polling Division

Area
  - Total: 1.01 km^{2} (0.39 sq mi)
- Elevation: 21 m (69 ft)

Population (2012)
  - Total: 6,709
  - Density: 6,643/km^{2} (17,210/sq mi)
- ISO 3166 code: LK-1127005

Kollupitiya

Kollupitiya Grama Niladhari Division is a Grama Niladhari Division of the Thimbirigasyaya Divisional Secretariat of Colombo District of Western Province, Sri Lanka.

Visumpaya, Temple Trees, Public Utilities Commission of Sri Lanka, S. Thomas' Preparatory School, A0 road (Sri Lanka), Ceylon Chamber of Commerce, St. Andrew's Presbyterian Church, Colombo, Marine Drive Tunnel and Seema Malaka are located within, nearby or associated with Kollupitiya.

Kollupitiya is a surrounded by the Wekanda, Ibbanwala, Galle Face, Bambalapitiya and Kurunduwatta Grama Niladhari Divisions.

== Demographics ==
=== Ethnicity ===
The Kollupitiya Grama Niladhari Division has a Sinhalese majority (50.9%), a significant Sri Lankan Tamil population (23.2%) and a significant Moor population (16.0%). In comparison, the Thimbirigasyaya Divisional Secretariat (which contains the Kollupitiya Grama Niladhari Division) has a Sinhalese majority (52.8%), a significant Sri Lankan Tamil population (28.0%) and a significant Moor population (15.1%)

Ethnicity in Kollupitiya
1. Sinhalese (50.9%)
2. Sri Lankan Tamil (23.2%)
3. Moor (16.0%)
4. Other (5.90%)
5. Malay (1.90%)
6. Indian Tamil (1.40%)
7. Other (0.70%)

=== Religion ===
The Kollupitiya Grama Niladhari Division has a Buddhist plurality (44.0%), a significant Muslim population (22.0%), a significant Hindu population (12.8%) and a significant Roman Catholic population (10.4%). In comparison, the Thimbirigasyaya Divisional Secretariat (which contains the Kollupitiya Grama Niladhari Division) has a Buddhist plurality (47.9%), a significant Hindu population (22.5%) and a significant Muslim population (17.4%)

Religion in Kollupitiya
1. Buddhist (44.0%)
2. Muslim (22.0%)
3. Hindu (12.8%)
4. Roman Catholic (10.4%)
5. Other Christian (9.90%)
6. Other (1.00%)

== Gallery ==
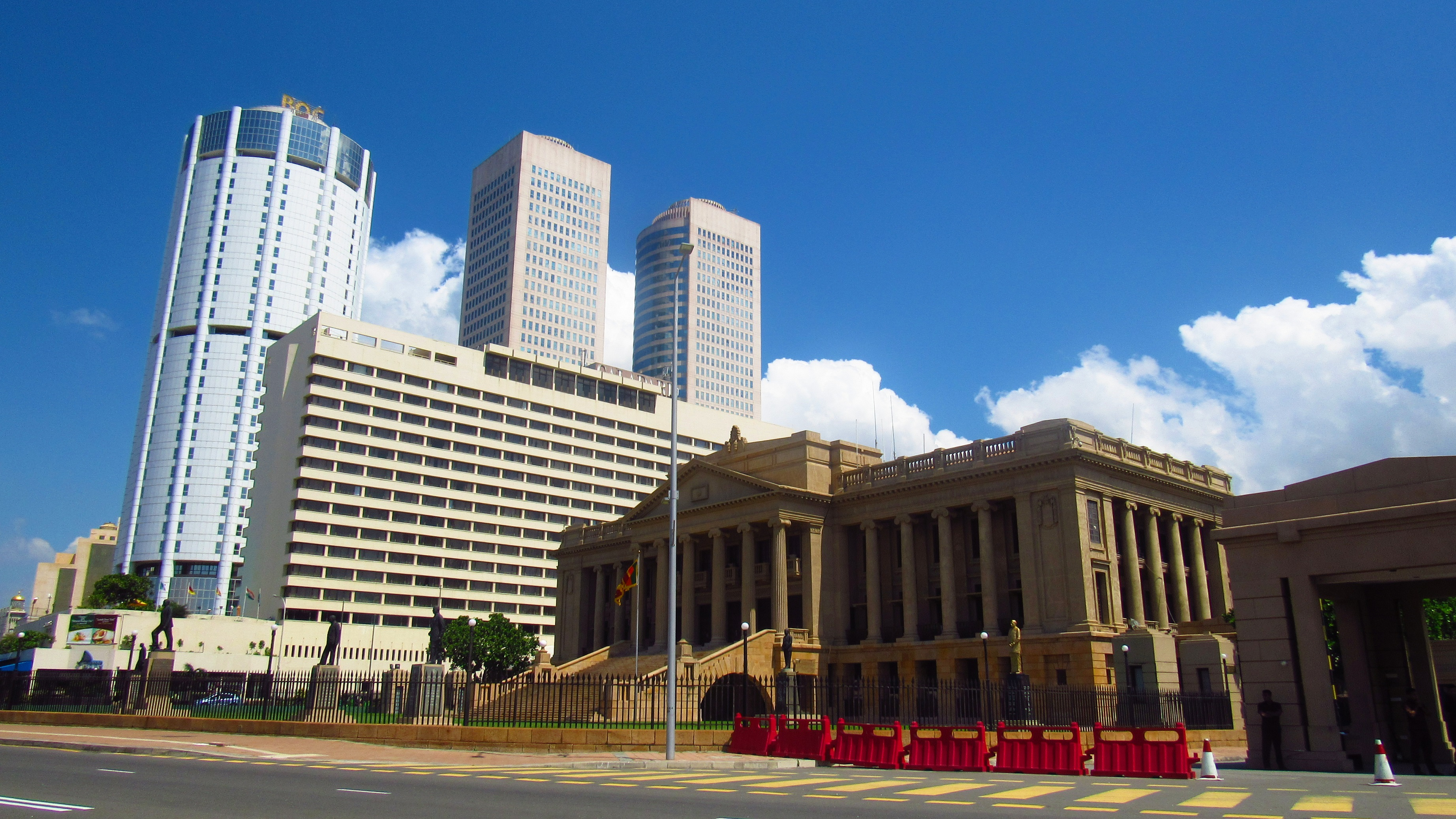
Visumpaya

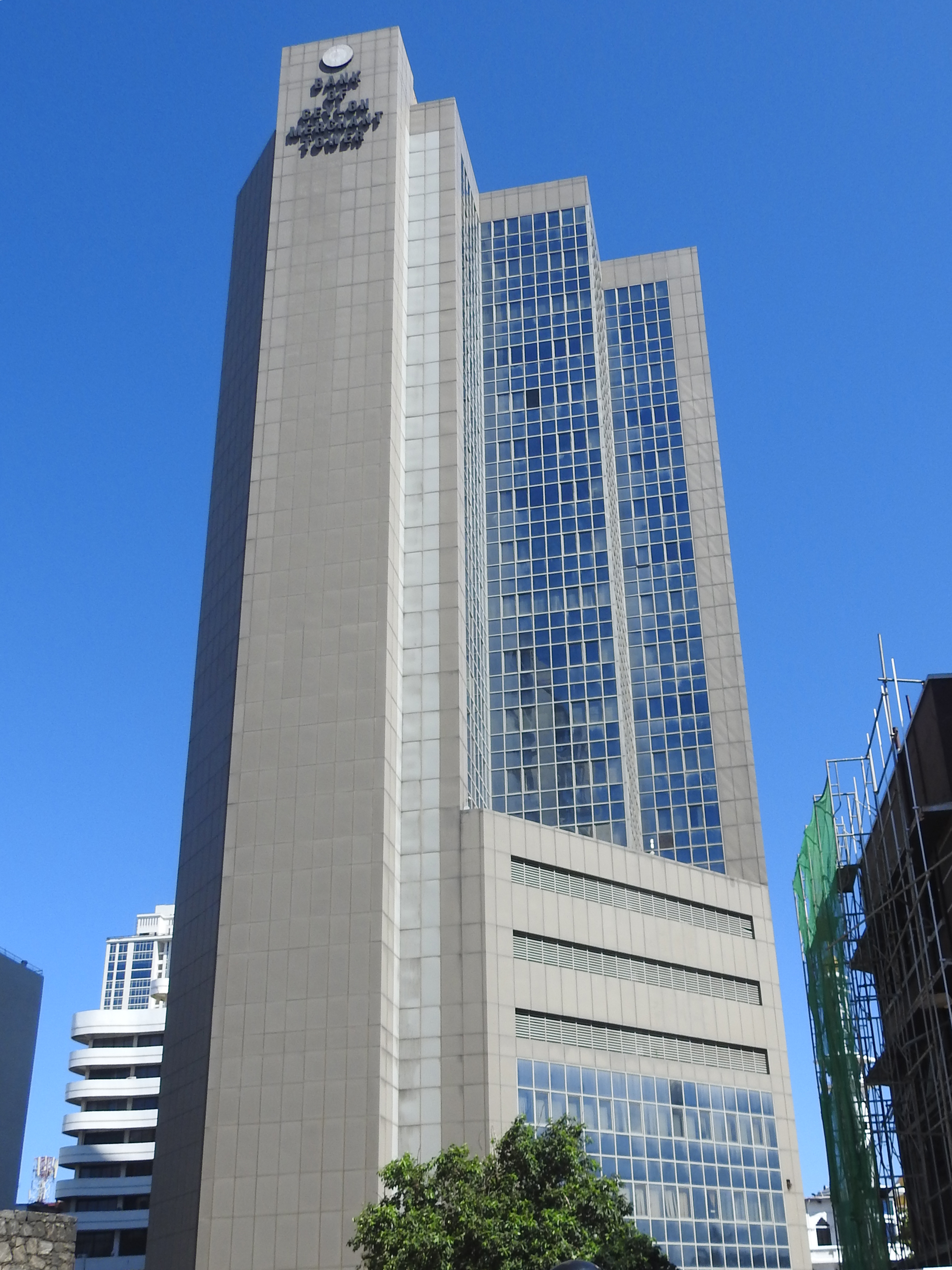
Public Utilities Commission of Sri Lanka

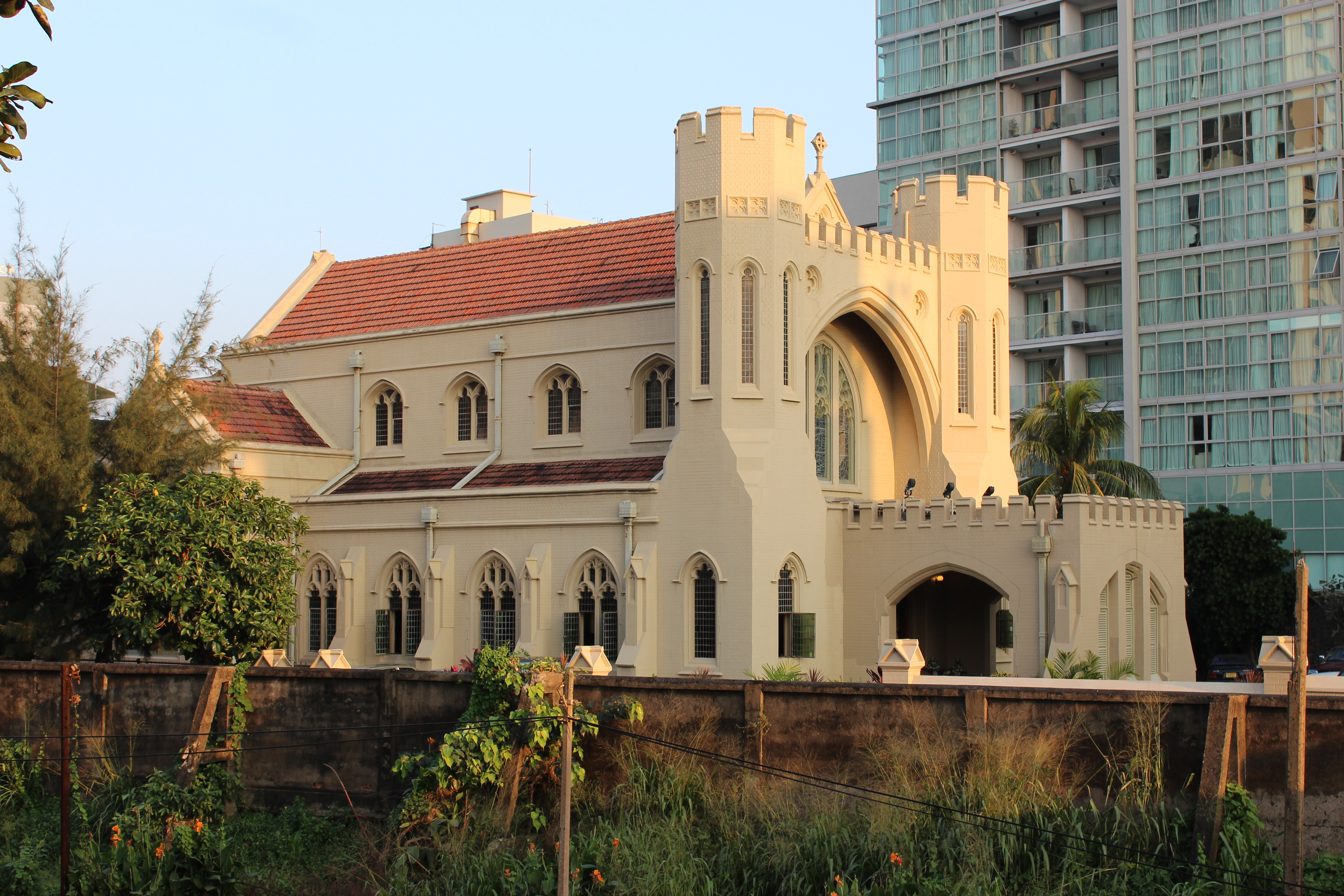
St. Andrew's Presbyterian Church, Colombo

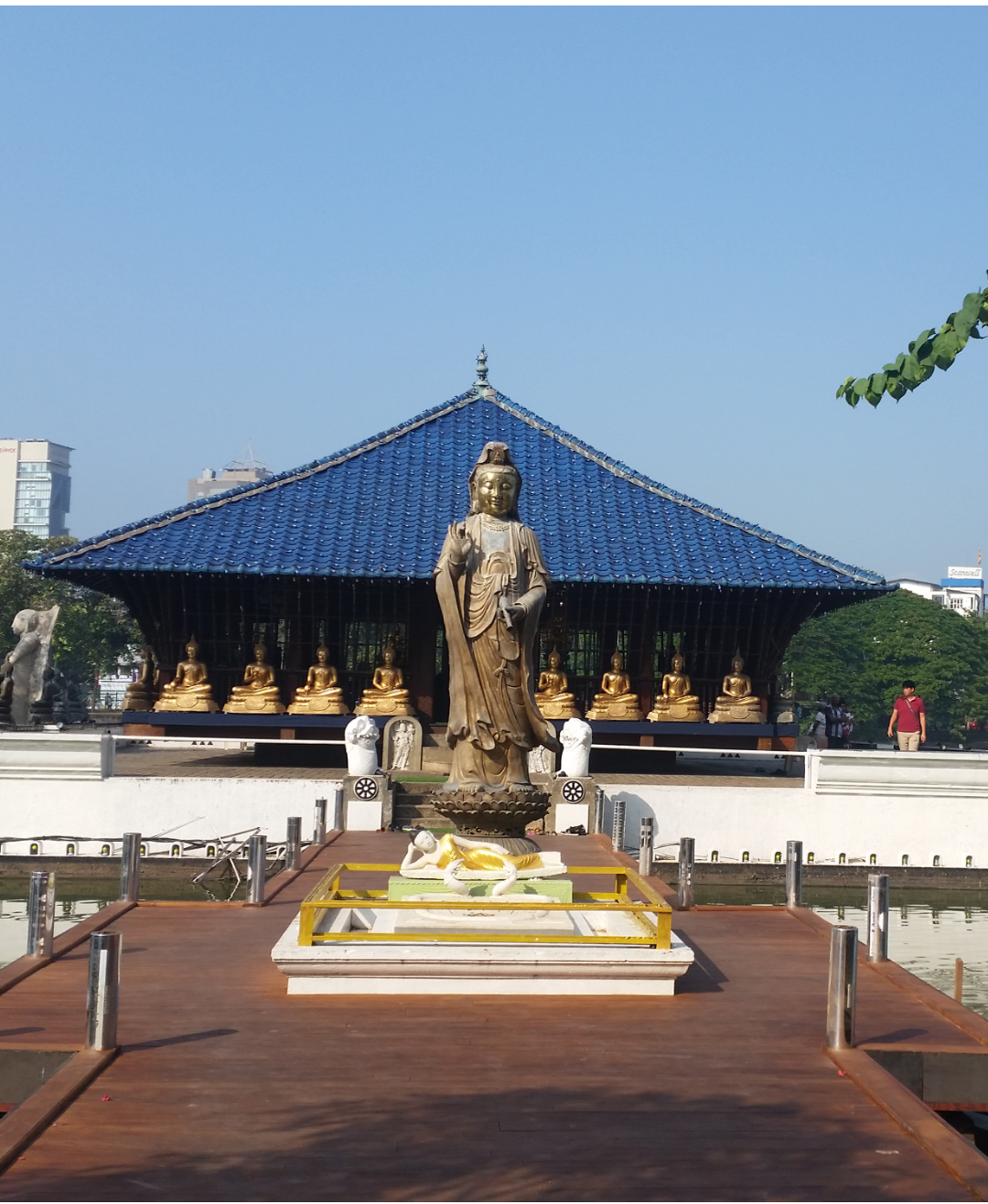
Seema Malaka
