= Thimbirigasyaya Divisional Secretariat =

- Divisional Secretariat
- Interactive map of Thimbirigasyaya Divisional Secretariat
- Coordinates: 6.889645°N 79.877442°E
- Country: Sri Lanka
- Province: Western Province
- District: Colombo District

Area
  - Total: 22 km^{2} (8.5 sq mi)
  - Land: 22 km^{2} (8.5 sq mi)

Population (2020)
  - Total: 251,441
  - Density: 11,430/km^{2} (29,600/sq mi)
- Time zone: UTC+5:30 (Sri Lanka Standard Time)

Thimbirigasyaya Divisional Secretariat is a Divisional Secretariat of Colombo District, of Western Province, Sri Lanka.

There are 20 Grama Nildhari Divisions under the divisional secretariate. 3 Medical Officer of Health(MOH) Areas (Colombo West, Colombo East, and Borella) and 2 Educational Offices (Colombo South and Borella) serve this region.

== Demography ==
Religion in Thimbirigasyaya DS Division (2012)
1. Buddhist (47.9%)
2. Hindu (22.5%)
3. Muslim (17.4%)
4. Roman Catholic (7.70%)
5. Other Christian (4.30%)
6. Other (0.20%)

== History ==
Established on 03-March-1999 through the public administration decentralization initiative.

== Grama Niladhari Divisions ==
There are 20 GN divisions in Thimbirigasyaya Divisional Secretariat.

- Bambalapitiya
- Borella North
- Borella South
- Dematagoda
- Gothamipura
- Havelock Town
- Kirula
- Kirulapone
- Kollupitiya
- Kuppiyawatte East
- Kuppiyawatte West
- Kurunduwatte
- Milagiriya
- Narahenpita
- Pamankada East
- Pamankada West
- Thimbirigasyaya
- Wanathamulla
- Wellawatte North
- Wellawatte South
