= Narahenpita Grama Niladhari Division =

Narahenpita
- Coordinates: 6.90276°N 79.880135°E
- Country: Sri Lanka
- Province: Western Province
- District: Colombo District
- Divisional Secretariat: Thimbirigasyaya Divisional Secretariat
- Electoral District: Colombo Electoral District
- Polling Division: Colombo East Polling Division

Population (2012)
  - Total: 11,166
- ISO 3166 code: LK-1127055

Narahenpita Grama Niladhari Division

Narahenpita Grama Niladhari Division is a Grama Niladhari Division of the Thimbirigasyaya Divisional Secretariat, of Colombo District, of Western Province, Sri Lanka.

== Demographics ==
=== Ethnicity ===
Narahenpita by Ethnicity
1. Sinhalese (77.5%)
2. Sri Lankan Tamil (12.9%)
3. Indian Tamil (0.8%)
4. Moor (5.4%)
5. Malay (0.8%)
6. Burgher (0.4%)
7. Chetty (0%)
8. Bharatha (0.4%)
9. Others (1.9%)

=== Religion ===
Narahenpita by Religion
1. Buddhist (73.4%)
2. Hindu (9.5%)
3. Islam (7.7%)
4. Roman Catholic (6.4%)
5. Other Christian (2.5%)
6. Others (0.5%)
