= Kirula Grama Niladhari Division =

Kirula
- Coordinates: 6.888169°N 79.877902°E
- Country: Sri Lanka
- Province: Western Province
- District: Colombo District
- Divisional Secretariat: Thimbirigasyaya Divisional Secretariat
- Electoral District: Colombo Electoral District
- Polling Division: Colombo East Polling Division

Population (2012)
  - Total: 20,237
- ISO 3166 code: LK-1127075

Kirula Grama Niladhari Division

Kirula Grama Niladhari Division is a Grama Niladhari Division of the Thimbirigasyaya Divisional Secretariat, of Colombo District, of Western Province, Sri Lanka.

== Demographics ==
=== Ethnicity ===
Kirula by Ethnicity
1. Sinhalese (67.3%)
2. Sri Lankan Tamil (25.7%)
3. Indian Tamil (1.1%)
4. Moor (3.9%)
5. Malay (0.7%)
6. Burgher (0.5%)
7. Chetty (0.2%)
8. Bharatha (0.1%)
9. Others (0.5%)

=== Religion ===
Kirula by Religion
1. Buddhist (62.1%)
2. Hindu (18.9%)
3. Islam (5.7%)
4. Roman Catholic (7.8%)
5. Other Christian (5.3%)
6. Others (0.1%)
