= Thimbirigasyaya Grama Niladhari Division =

Thimbirigasyaya
- Coordinates: 6.897223°N 79.869418°E
- Country: Sri Lanka
- Province: Western Province
- District: Colombo District
- Divisional Secretariat: Thimbirigasyaya Divisional Secretariat
- Electoral District: Colombo Electoral District
- Polling Division: Colombo East Polling Division

Population (2012)
  - Total: 12,673
- ISO 3166 code: LK-1127060

Thimbirigasyaya Grama Niladhari Division

Thimbirigasyaya Grama Niladhari Division is a Grama Niladhari Division of the Thimbirigasyaya Divisional Secretariat, of Colombo District, of Western Province, Sri Lanka.

== Demographics ==
=== Ethnicity ===
Thimbirigasyaya by Ethnicity
1. Sinhalese 66.1 (66.0%)
2. Sri Lankan Tamil 18.6 (18.6%)
3. Indian Tamil 1.4 (1.40%)
4. Moor 11.8 (11.8%)
5. Malay 0.5 (0.50%)
6. Burgher 0.4 (0.40%)
7. Chetty 0 (0.00%)
8. Bharatha 0.1 (0.10%)
9. Others 1.2 (1.20%)

=== Religion ===
Thimbirigasyaya by Religion
1. Buddhist (59.3%)
2. Hindu (14.2%)
3. Islam (13.6%)
4. Roman Catholic (8.5%)
5. Other Christian (4%)
6. Others (0.4%)
