= Borella North Grama Niladhari Division =

Borella North
- Coordinates: 6.919333°N 79.880946°E
- Country: Sri Lanka
- Province: Western Province
- District: Colombo District
- Divisional Secretariat: Thimbirigasyaya Divisional Secretariat
- Electoral District: Colombo Electoral District
- Polling Division: Borella Polling Division

Population (2012)
  - Total: 21,326
- ISO 3166 code: LK-1127040

Borella North Grama Niladhari Division

Borella North Grama Niladhari Division is a Grama Niladhari Division of the Thimbirigasyaya Divisional Secretariat, of Colombo District, of Western Province, Sri Lanka.

== Demographics ==
=== Ethnicity ===
Borella North by Ethnicity
1. Sinhalese (81.6%)
2. Sri Lankan Tamil (10.3%)
3. Indian Tamil (0.4%)
4. Moor (5.9%)
5. Malay (0.5%)
6. Burgher (0.6%)
7. Chetty (0.1%)
8. Bharatha (0%)
9. Others (0.6%)

=== Religion ===
Borella North by Religion
1. Buddhist (76.8%)
2. Hindu (7.8%)
3. Islam (6.8%)
4. Roman Catholic (6.5%)
5. Other Christian (1.9%)
6. Others (0.1%)
