= 2012 Welikada prison riot =

Prison riot in Colombo, Sri Lanka

Welikada prison riot
- Location within Sri Lanka
- Date: 9 November 2012 to 10 November 2012
- Location: Welikada Prison, Colombo, Sri Lanka; 6°55′16″N 79°52′44″E
- Cause: Contraband search
- Deaths: 27
- Injuries: 40

The Welikada prison riot was a prison riot that occurred on 9 November 2012 at Welikada Prison in Sri Lanka. The riot broke out during a search for illegal arms. The riot left 27 people dead and 40 injured. The government has appointed a committee to investigate the riot. Welikada Prison, which has around 4,000 prisoners, has witnessed a number of violent riots in its history. This prison riot was the worst in Sri Lanka's history since the 1983 riot, also at Welikada Prison, which left 53 prisoners dead.

== Riot ==
At around 1.30 pm local time on 9 November 2012 around 300 commandos from the Special Task Force (STF), a paramilitary unit of the Sri Lanka Police Service, arrived at Welikada prison to assist prison guards searching for illegal arms, drugs and mobile phones. The search was first carried out in the "L" section which was home to hardcore criminals. Despite protests from prisoners, the STF completed their search, recovering drugs and mobile phones from the cells. At around 4 pm the STF moved on to the "Chapel Ward" which was home to death sentence, life sentence and other long sentence prisoners. The STF commandos wanted to handcuff the prisoners but they objected and arguments and fighting broke out between the STF commandos and the prisoners. Some prisoners alleged that they had been stripped and beaten up. The prisoners started throwing stones and other objects at the STF. As the disturbance grew the STF tried to suppress the riot using tear gas but at around 4.30 pm prisoners working in the "Pingo" section broke into the main area and also started fighting with STF. The STF and the prison officials had to retreat from the prison.

The prisoners took control of the prison and a siege ensued during which some officials were held hostage by the prisoners. Numerous prisoners appeared on the prison's roof, some brandishing weapons. They started throwing stones at the STF who were now on the road outside the prison. They also threatened onlookers.

The prison was surrounded by the police and roads leading to the prison were closed at 5.45 pm. At around this time the prisoners broke into the prison's armouries and took arms including assault rifles. At around 6.15 pm five prisoners broke out of the prison and tried to escape on a trishaw. They opened fire at the STF who returned fire killing four of the prisoners. Over the next half an hour there was heavy gunfights between the prisoners in the prison and the authorities outside. There was a power cut in the area at 6.25 pm which added more confusion to the situation. The authorities tried to storm the prison several times but had to withdraw after coming under fire from the prisoners. The army was called in, bringing with it an armoured car. The authorities had then planned to storm the prison at 8 pm but this had to be postponed due to heavy rain. Eventually, at 2 am, the STF stormed the prison and took full control of the prison.

27 people, all prisoners, had been killed and 40 injured (20 prisoners, 13 STF, four soldiers, one prison guard and two others). Eyewitnesses, human rights groups and opposition politicians have alleged that some of the dead prisoners had been executed. A number of prisoners also escaped but most were recaptured.

The prisoners may have had inside help – it's alleged that some prison guards had been selling contraband items to the prisoners and they weren't happy that the STF had been brought in to assist with the searches.

== Reaction and investigation ==
The police have defended their actions, saying "By killing the prisoners who were armed, we prevented a much bigger disaster". Minister of Rehabilitation and Prison Reforms Chandrasiri Gajadeera announced on 10 November 2012 that he had appointed a three-member committee to investigate the riot. A second investigation is to be carried out by Prisons Commissioner General P. W. Kodippili.

The opposition has described the riot as a massacre and called for a parliamentary select committee to investigate the riot. Civil rights groups have also called for an independent investigation.

The Asian Human Rights Commission has condemned the authorities actions and has called on the government to carry out a "thorough and credible inquiry" into the riot. The European Union has urged the authorities to ensure that the investigations into the riot are carried out impartially and speedily.

=== Sentences ===
In January 2022 the Colombo High Court sentenced the former Superintendent of Magazine Prison Lamahewage Emil Ranjan to death over 33 counts including committing murder, conspiring to commit murder and unlawful assembly. But he was not executed and was released from death row in 2024 after successfully appealing the conviction. Inspector of Police Neomal Rangajeewa of Police Narcotics Bureau was acquitted and released from all charges.
