= Panchikawatte =

Panchikawatta පංචිකාවත්ත பஞ்சிகாவத்தை
- Suburb
- Location within Greater Colombo Location within Colombo District Location within Sri Lanka
- Coordinates: 6°55′33″N 79°52′31″E
- Country: Sri Lanka
- Province: Western Province
- District: Colombo District
- Time zone: UTC+5:30 (Sri Lanka Standard Time Zone)
- Postal Code: 01000

Panchikawatta is a suburb of Colombo, Sri Lanka and is part of the area numbered Colombo 10. Its postcode is 01000. Panchikawatte is known for spares and motor parts. The Tower Hall is located here. A majority of Muslims and Tamils live here. All buses which travel from Fort, travel by this way. The Alexor International College is situated here.
