= Kurunduwatta Grama Niladhari Division =

Kurunduwatta
- Coordinates: 6.911148°N 79.867659°E
- Country: Sri Lanka
- Province: Western Province
- District: Colombo District
- Divisional Secretariat: Thimbirigasyaya Divisional Secretariat
- Electoral District: Colombo Electoral District
- Polling Division: Borella Polling Division

Population (2012)
  - Total: 9,865
- ISO 3166 code: LK-1127015

Kurunduwatta Grama Niladhari Division

Kurunduwatta Grama Niladhari Division is a Grama Niladhari Division of the Thimbirigasyaya Divisional Secretariat, of Colombo District, of Western Province, Sri Lanka.

== Demographics ==
=== Ethnicity ===
Kurunduwatta by Ethnicity
1. Sinhalese 73.9 (73.8%)
2. Sri Lankan Tamil 14.5 (14.5%)
3. Indian Tamil 1.3 (1.30%)
4. Moor 7.8 (7.79%)
5. Malay 0.2 (0.20%)
6. Burgher 0.7 (0.70%)
7. Chetty 0 (0.00%)
8. Bharatha 0.1 (0.10%)
9. Others 1.6 (1.60%)

=== Religion ===
Kurunduwatta by Religion
1. Buddhist (63.5%)
2. Hindu (12.7%)
3. Islam (9%)
4. Roman Catholic (9.9%)
5. Other Christian (4.2%)
6. Others (0.7%)
