= Grama Niladhari =

Sri Lankan public official

Grama Niladhari (English: village officer, Sinhala: ග්‍රාම නිලධාරී, romanized: grāma niladhārī, Tamil: கிராம உத்தியோகத்தர், romanized: Kirāma uttiyōkattar) is a Sri Lankan public official appointed by the central government by act No.2 of 1993. Grama Niladhari are entrusted with many duties and responsibilities under 46 legislative enactments.

== Functions ==
Their functions are to carry out administrative duties in a grama niladhari division, which is a sub-unit of a divisional secretariat. They come under the Grama Niladhari Division under the Home Affairs Division of the Ministry of Home Affairs. There are 14,020 grama niladhari divisions under 331 divisional secretary’s division in the island.

The duties of a grama niladhari include the reporting of issuing of permits, gathering statistics, maintaining the voter registry and keeping the peace by settlement of personal disputes. They are responsible for keeping track of criminal activity in their area and issuing certificates of residence and character when requested by residents. They may arrest individuals if sworn in as a Peace Officer.

== History of the name ==
The post of Grama Sevaka (village servant) was created in May 1963 as part of the public administration reforms carried out by Minister Felix Dias Bandaranaike in the Sirimavo Bandaranaike government, which replaced the post of village headman (Vidane) which dated back to the British colonial era. All serving village headman were re-designated as Grama Sevakas under the Village Headmen (Change of Designation) Act, No. 6 of 1964. The designation modeled on that of public servant was later changed to grama niladhari. A notable example is Maithripala Sirisena, who later became the President of Sri Lanka.

== See also ==
- Bootawatta South Grama Niladhari Division
- Native headmen of Ceylon
- Vidane
- Government of Sri Lanka
