= Kochchikade South Grama Niladhari Division =

Kochchikade South
- Grama Niladhari Division
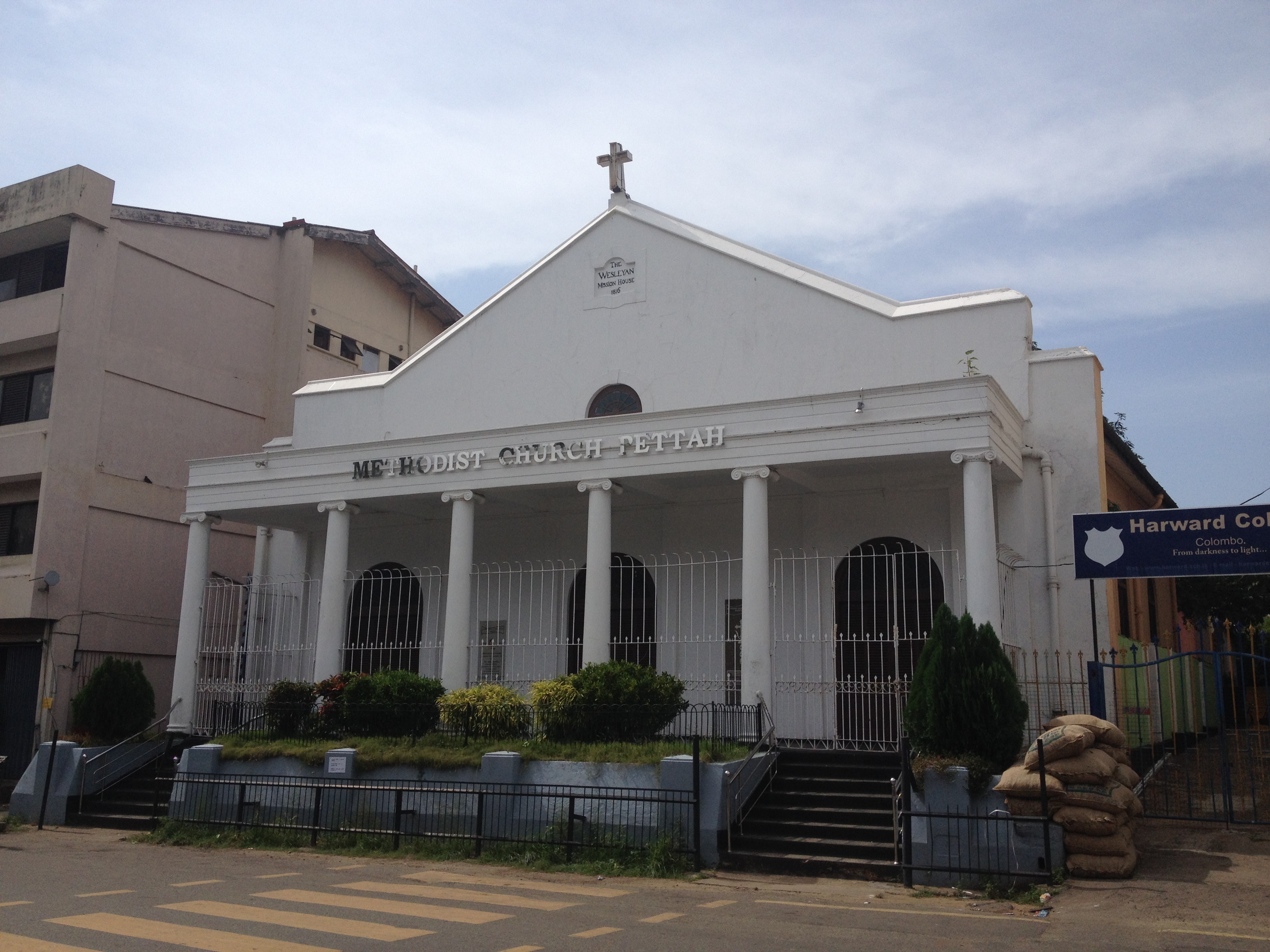
- Methodist Church, Pettah is located within, nearby or associated with the Kochchikade South Grama Niladhari Division
- Interactive map of Kochchikade South
- Coordinates: 6.938588°N 79.857008°E
- Country: Sri Lanka
- Province: Western Province
- District: Colombo District
- Divisional Secretariat: Colombo Divisional Secretariat
- Electoral District: Colombo Electoral District
- Polling Division: Colombo Central Polling Division

Area
  - Total: 0.26 km^{2} (0.10 sq mi)
- Elevation: 30 m (98 ft)

Population (2012)
  - Total: 7,746
  - Density: 29,792/km^{2} (77,160/sq mi)
- ISO 3166 code: LK-1103110

Kochchikade South

Kochchikade South Grama Niladhari Division is a Grama Niladhari Division of the Colombo Divisional Secretariat of Colombo District of Western Province, Sri Lanka.

Methodist Church, Pettah, Grand Mosque of Colombo, Hameed Al Husseinie College, Kayman's Gate, Sri Lanka Law College, Wolvendaal Church, Hulftsdorp, Colombo Central Bus Station bombing, St. Thomas' Church, Colombo and Kotahena are located within, nearby or associated with Kochchikade South.

Kochchikade South is a surrounded by the Keselwatta, Masangasweediya, Aluthkade West, Jinthupitiya, Kochchikade North and Pettah Grama Niladhari Divisions.

== Demographics ==
=== Ethnicity ===
The Kochchikade South Grama Niladhari Division has a Moor majority (60.3%), a significant Sri Lankan Tamil population (21.1%) and a significant Sinhalese population (16.0%). In comparison, the Colombo Divisional Secretariat (which contains the Kochchikade South Grama Niladhari Division) has a Moor plurality (40.1%), a significant Sri Lankan Tamil population (31.1%) and a significant Sinhalese population (25.0%)

Ethnicity in Kochchikade South
1. Moor (60.3%)
2. Sri Lankan Tamil (21.1%)
3. Sinhalese (16.0%)
4. Indian Tamil (2.20%)
5. Other (0.40%)

=== Religion ===
The Kochchikade South Grama Niladhari Division has a Muslim majority (60.3%), a significant Hindu population (19.4%) and a significant Buddhist population (14.9%). In comparison, the Colombo Divisional Secretariat (which contains the Kochchikade South Grama Niladhari Division) has a Muslim plurality (41.8%), a significant Hindu population (22.7%), a significant Buddhist population (19.0%) and a significant Roman Catholic population (13.1%)

Religion in Kochchikade South
1. Muslim (60.3%)
2. Hindu (19.4%)
3. Buddhist (14.9%)
4. Roman Catholic (4.00%)
5. Other Christian (1.40%)
6. Other (0.00%)

== Gallery ==
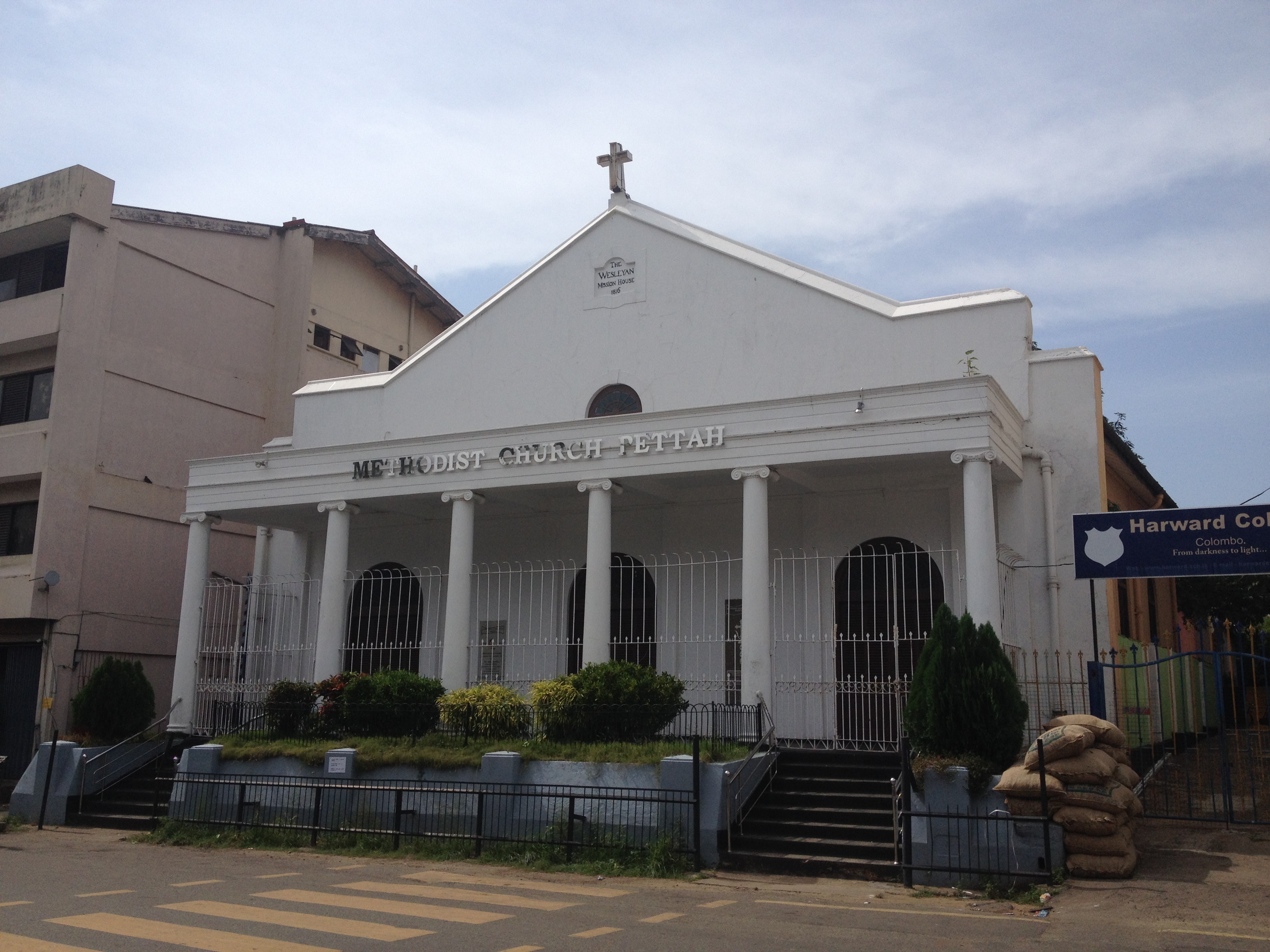
Methodist Church, Pettah

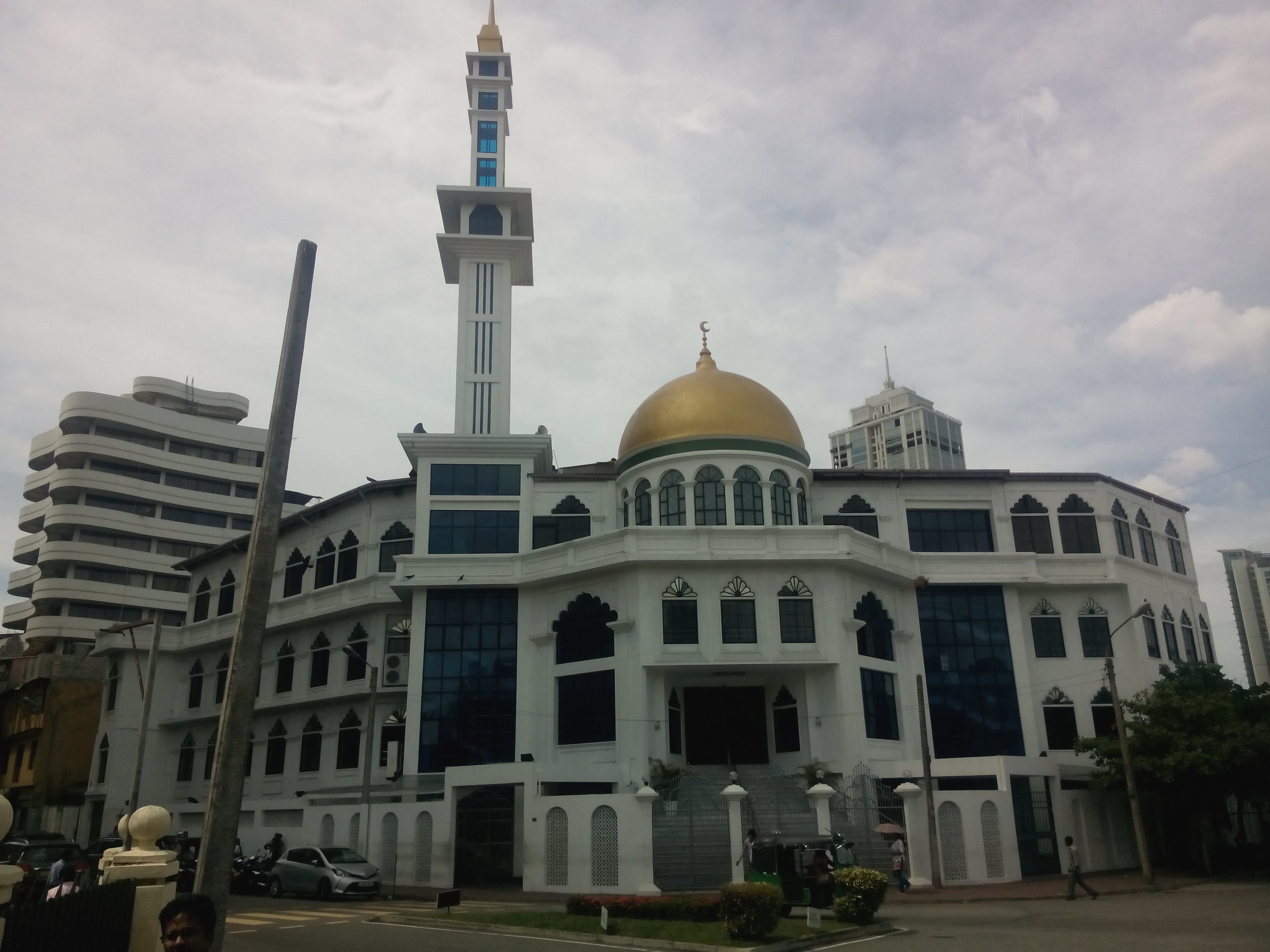
Grand Mosque of Colombo

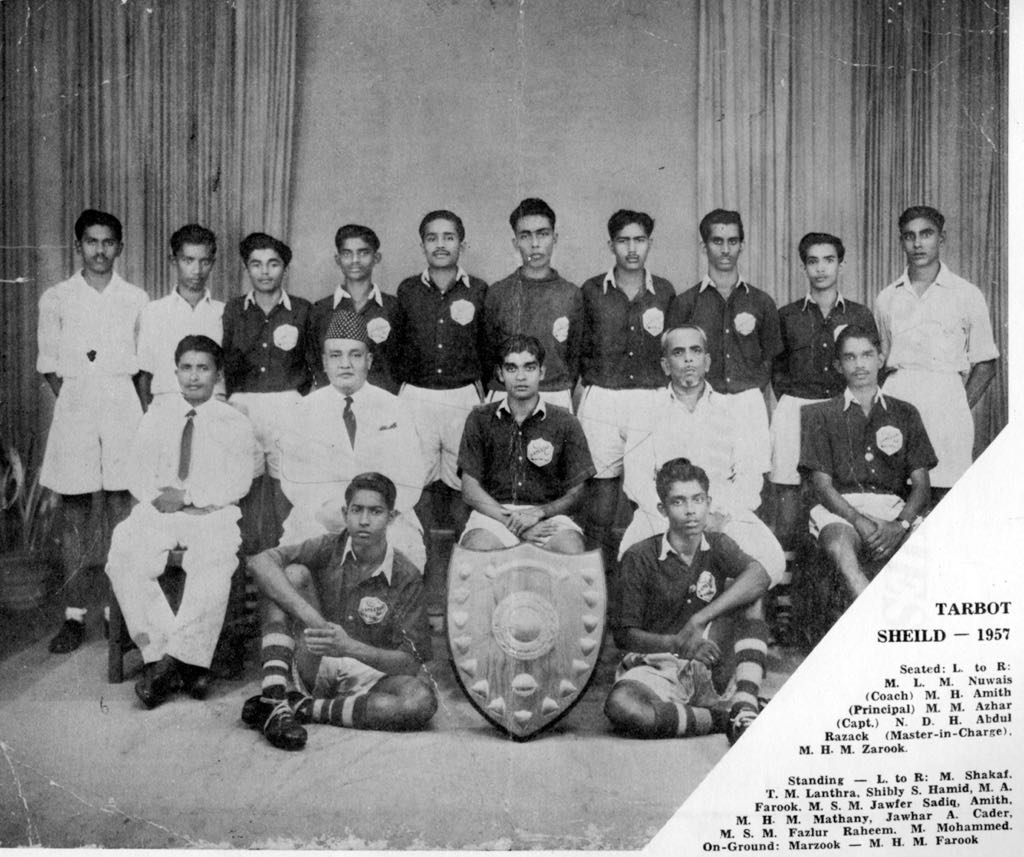
Hameed Al Husseinie College

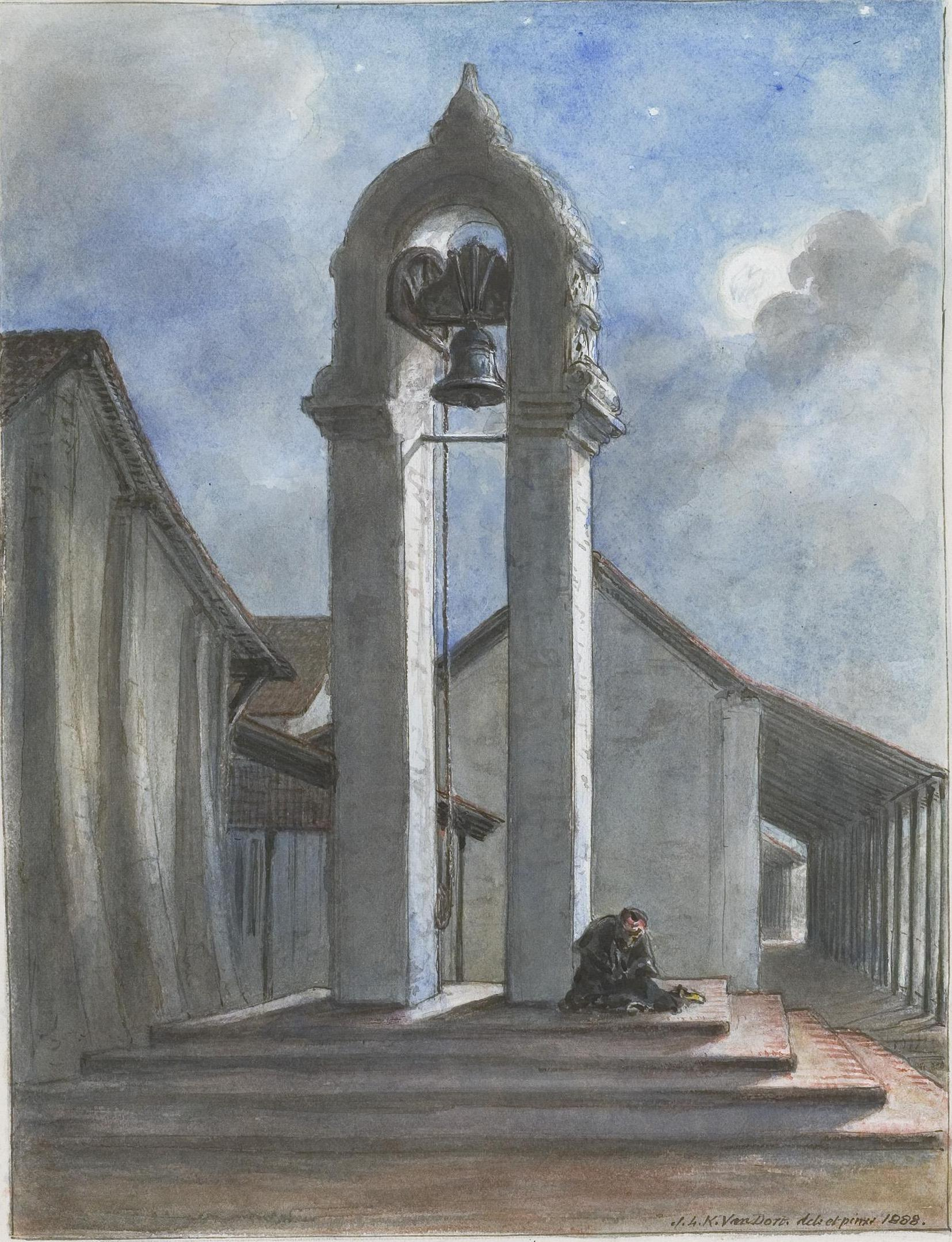
Kayman's Gate

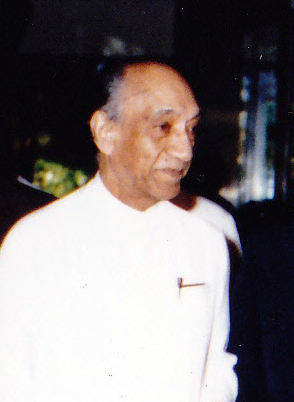
Sri Lanka Law College

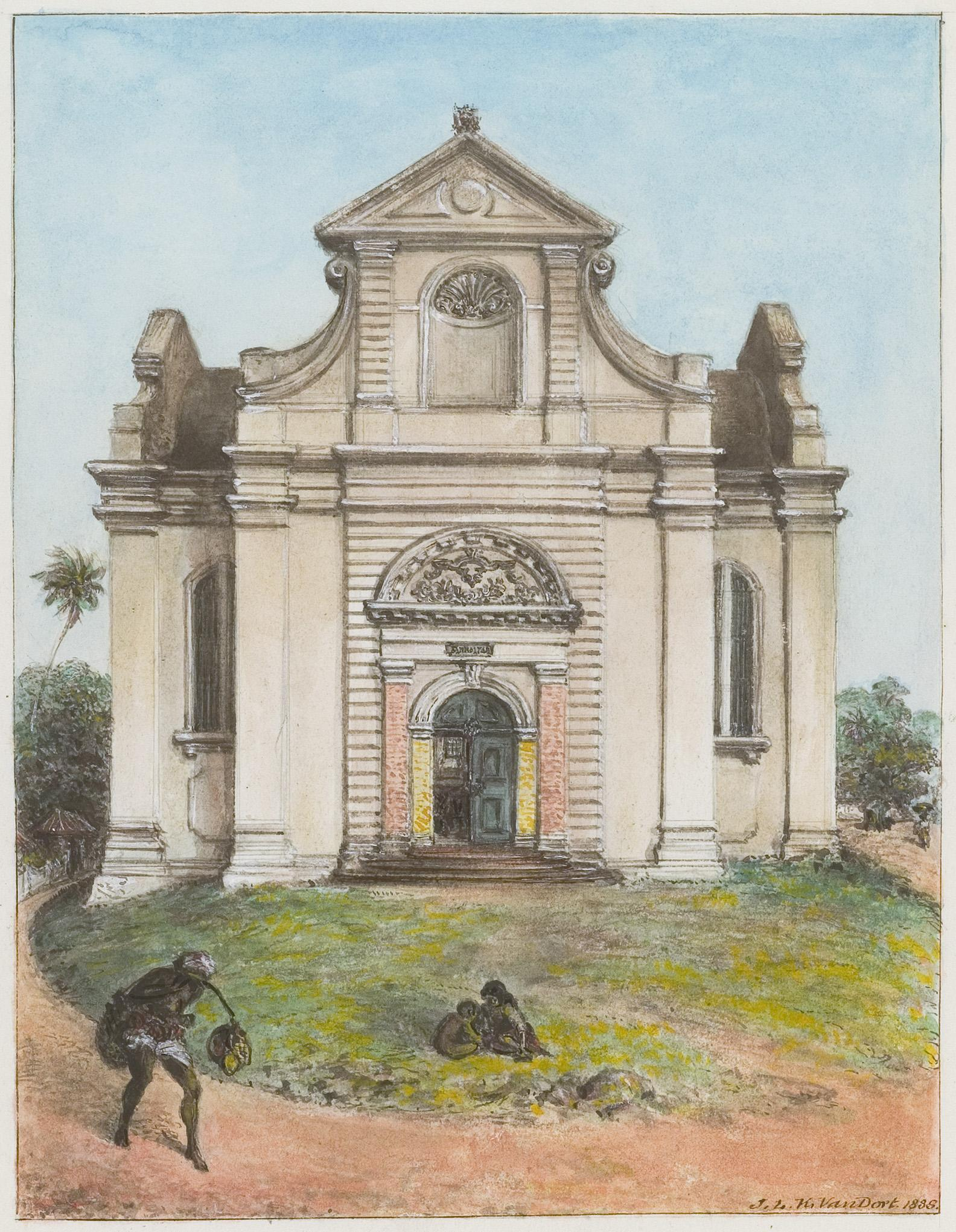
Wolvendaal Church

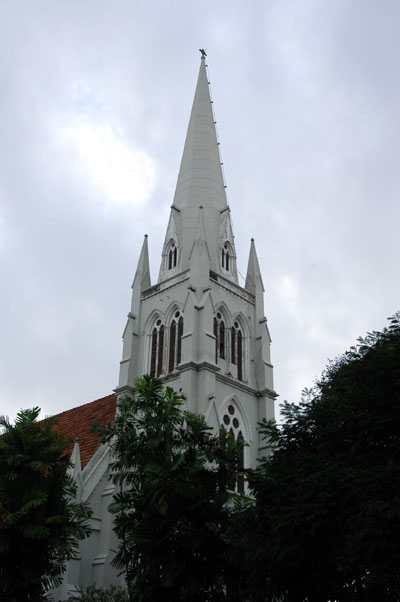
Hulftsdorp

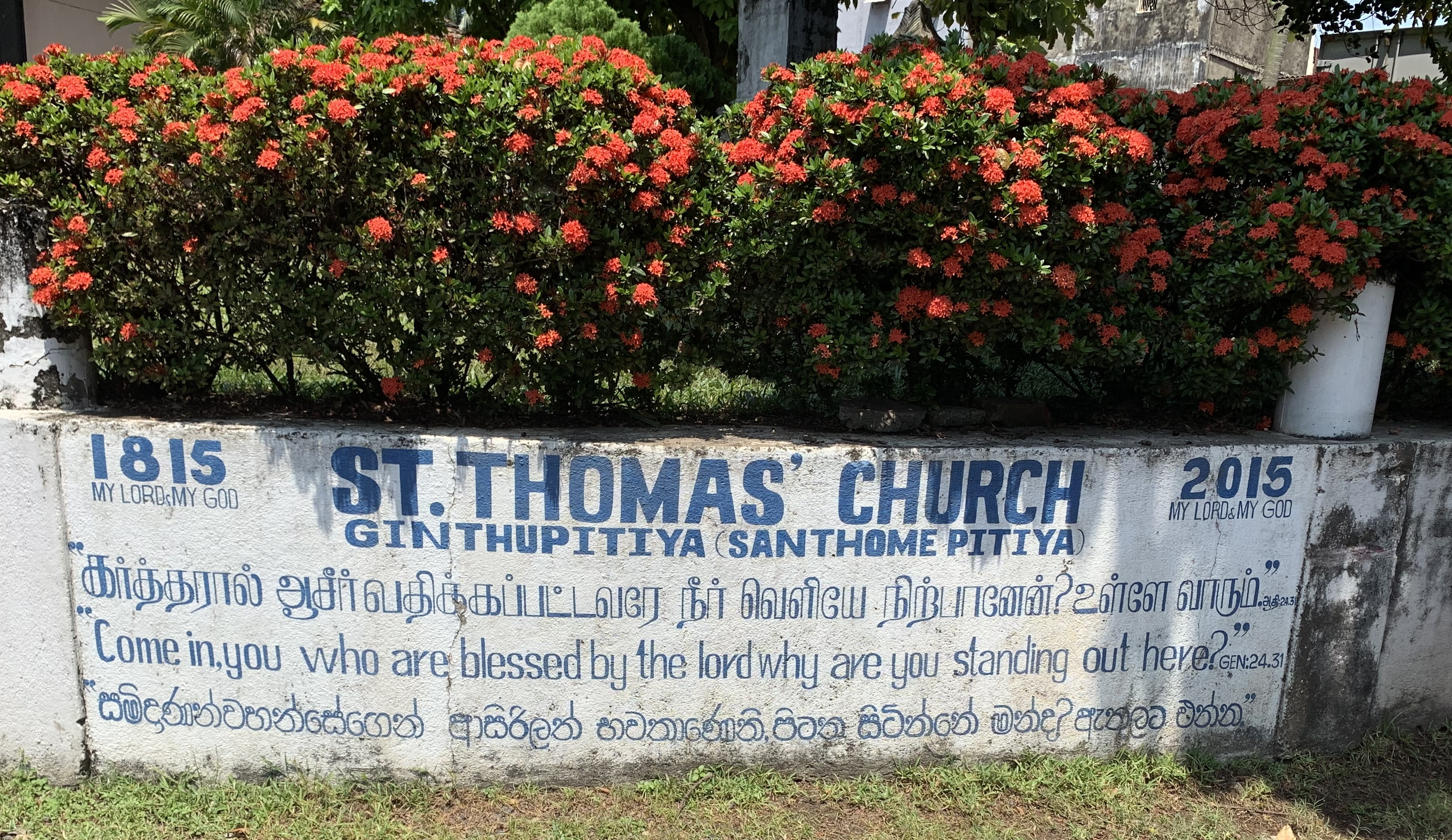
St. Thomas' Church, Colombo
