= Aluthkade East Grama Niladhari Division =

Aluthkade East
- Grama Niladhari Division
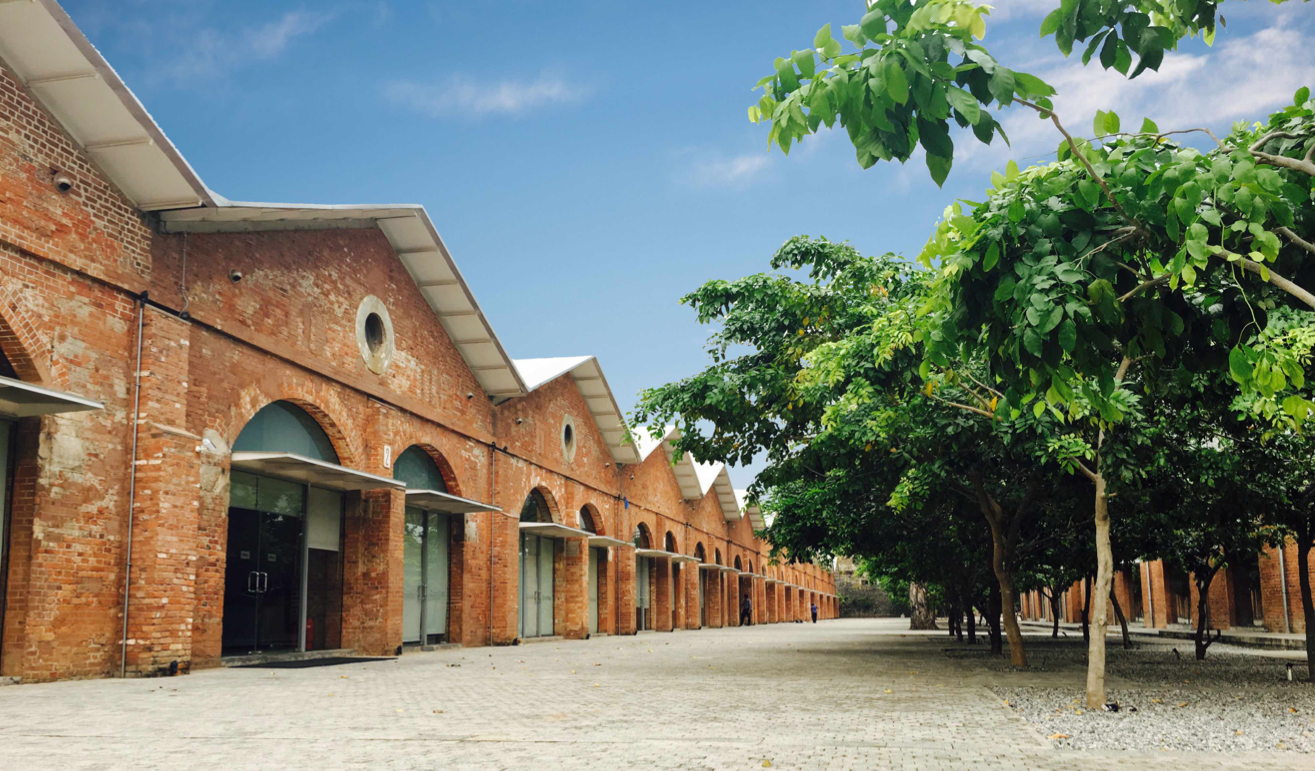
- Trace City is located within, nearby or associated with the Aluthkade East Grama Niladhari Division
- Interactive map of Aluthkade East
- Coordinates: 6.936897°N 79.864080°E
- Country: Sri Lanka
- Province: Western Province
- District: Colombo District
- Divisional Secretariat: Colombo Divisional Secretariat
- Electoral District: Colombo Electoral District
- Polling Division: Colombo Central Polling Division

Area
  - Total: 0.3 km^{2} (0.12 sq mi)
- Elevation: 34 m (112 ft)

Population (2012)
  - Total: 10,053
  - Density: 33,510/km^{2} (86,800/sq mi)
- ISO 3166 code: LK-1103100

Aluthkade East

Aluthkade East Grama Niladhari Division is a Grama Niladhari Division of the Colombo Divisional Secretariat of Colombo District of Western Province, Sri Lanka.

Sri Lanka Law College, Hameed Al Husseinie College, Grand Mosque of Colombo, Ministry of Fisheries and Aquatic Resources Development, Trace City, Wolvendaal Church, Maligawatta, Methodist Church, Pettah, Hulftsdorp and St. Thomas' Church, Colombo are located within, nearby or associated with Aluthkade East.

Aluthkade East is a surrounded by the New Bazaar, Keselwatta, Masangasweediya, Panchikawatta, Khettarama and Aluthkade West Grama Niladhari Divisions.

== Demographics ==
=== Ethnicity ===
The Aluthkade East Grama Niladhari Division has a Moor majority (83.5%) and a significant Sri Lankan Tamil population (10.5%). In comparison, the Colombo Divisional Secretariat (which contains the Aluthkade East Grama Niladhari Division) has a Moor plurality (40.1%), a significant Sri Lankan Tamil population (31.1%) and a significant Sinhalese population (25.0%)

Ethnicity in Aluthkade East
1. Moor (83.5%)
2. Sri Lankan Tamil (10.5%)
3. Sinhalese (4.50%)
4. Other (1.50%)

=== Religion ===
The Aluthkade East Grama Niladhari Division has a Muslim majority (83.9%). In comparison, the Colombo Divisional Secretariat (which contains the Aluthkade East Grama Niladhari Division) has a Muslim plurality (41.8%), a significant Hindu population (22.7%), a significant Buddhist population (19.0%) and a significant Roman Catholic population (13.1%)

Religion in Aluthkade East
1. Muslim (83.9%)
2. Hindu (8.40%)
3. Buddhist (4.30%)
4. Roman Catholic (2.20%)
5. Other Christian (1.20%)
6. Other (0.00%)

== Gallery ==
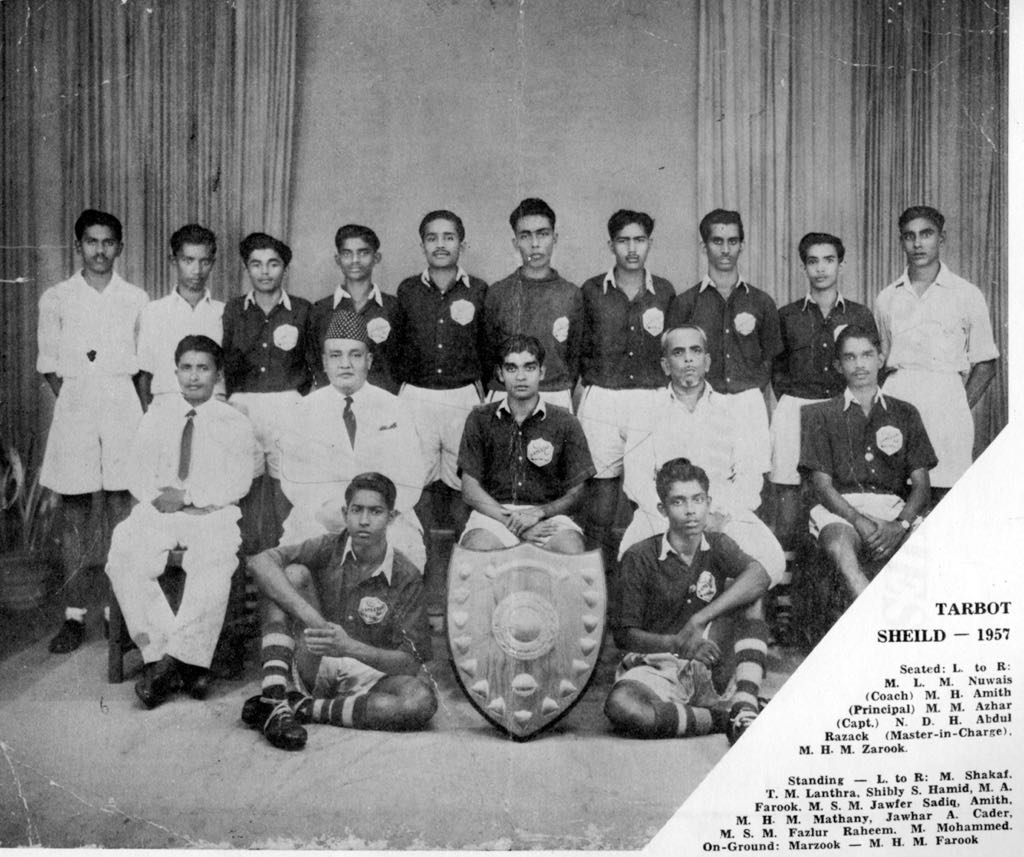
Hameed Al Husseinie College

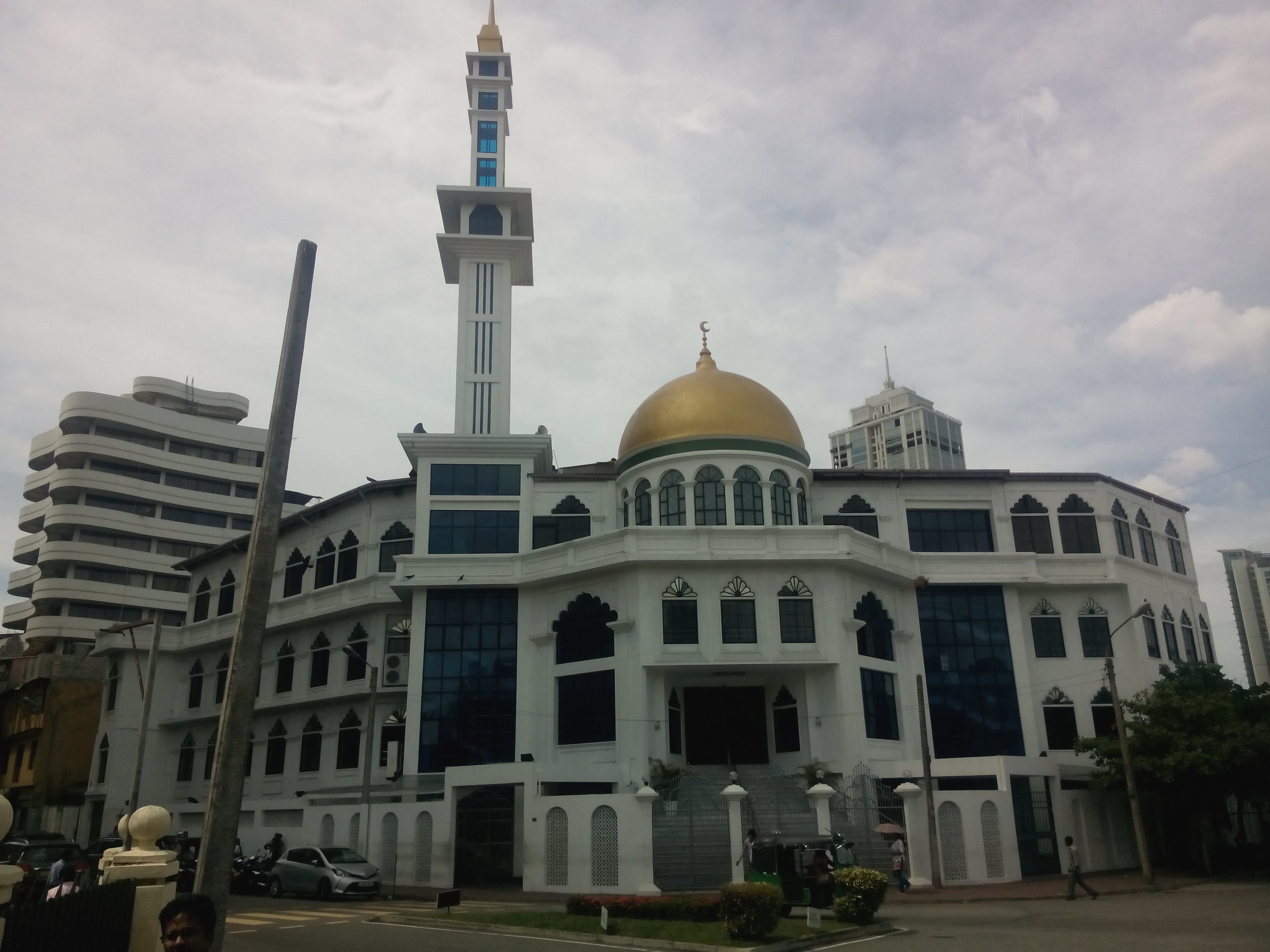
Grand Mosque of Colombo

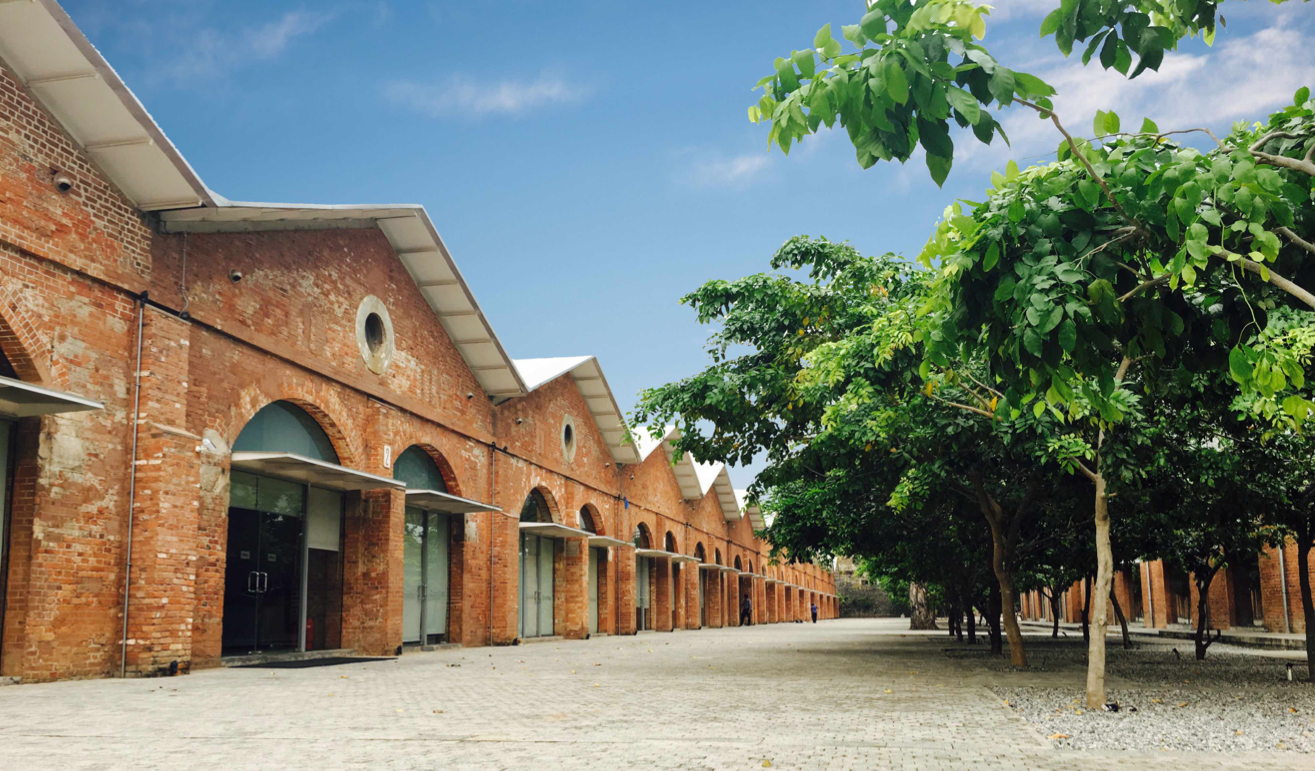
Trace City

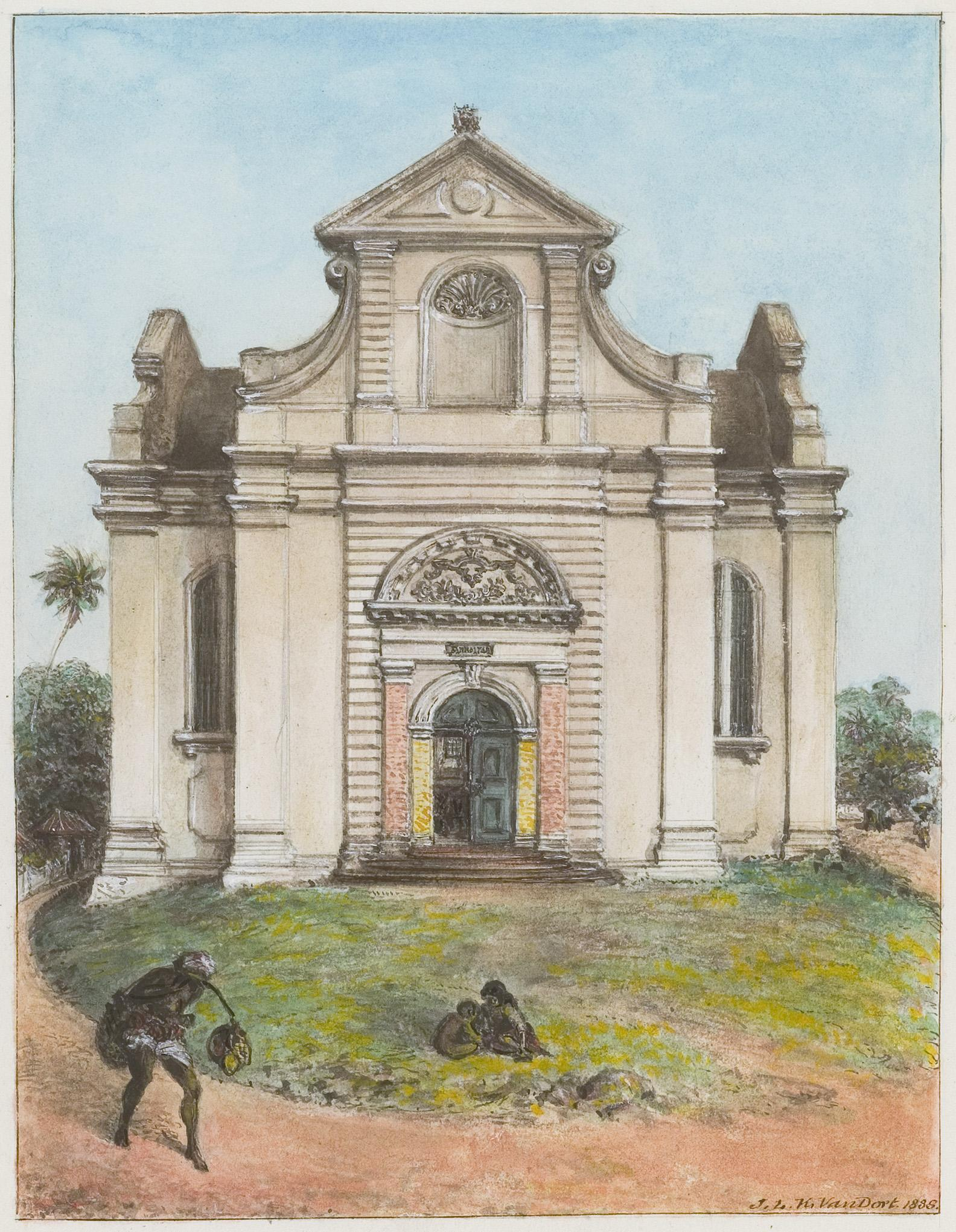
Wolvendaal Church

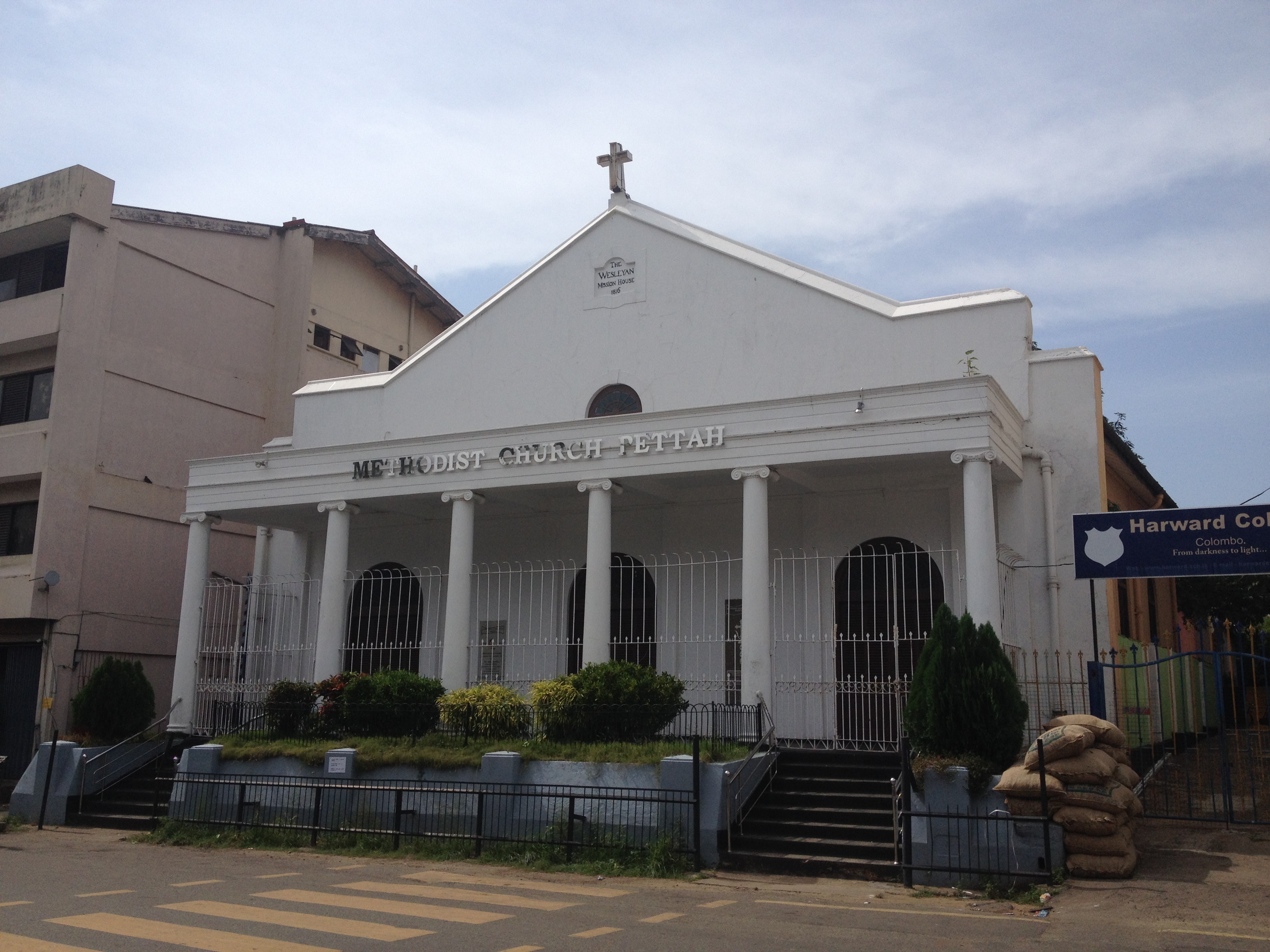
Methodist Church, Pettah

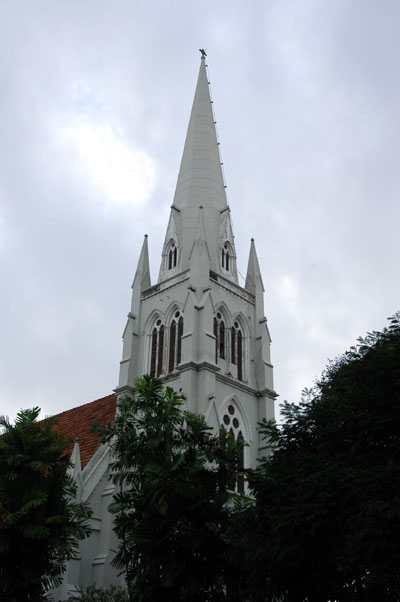
Hulftsdorp

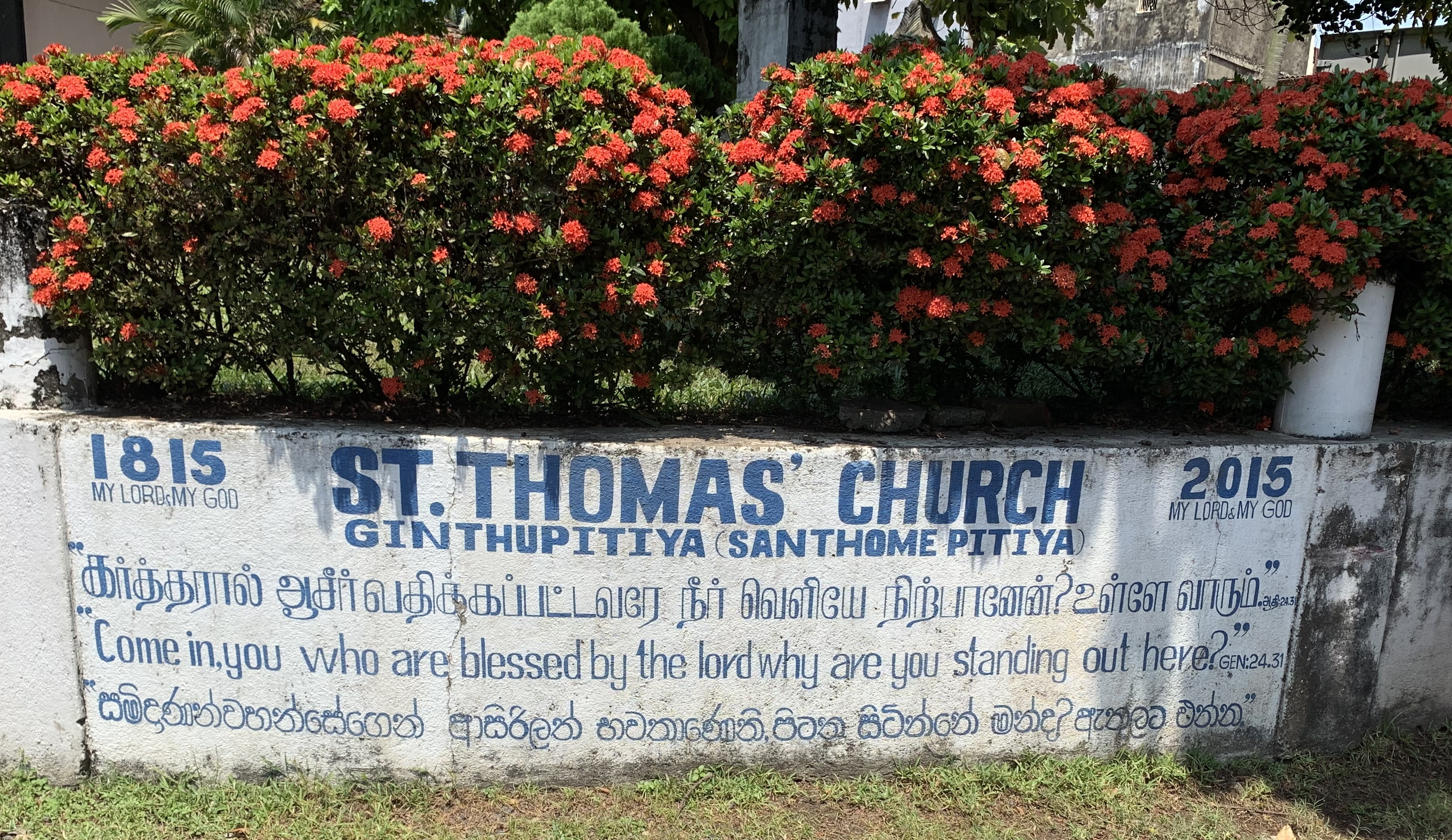
St. Thomas' Church, Colombo
