= New Bazaar Grama Niladhari Division =

New Bazaar
- Grama Niladhari Division
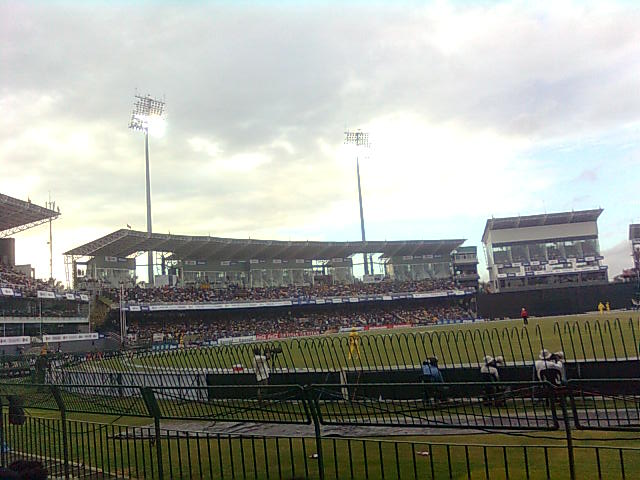
- R. Premadasa Stadium is located within, nearby or associated with the New Bazaar Grama Niladhari Division
- Interactive map of New Bazaar
- Coordinates: 6.942411°N 79.866882°E
- Country: Sri Lanka
- Province: Western Province
- District: Colombo District
- Divisional Secretariat: Colombo Divisional Secretariat
- Electoral District: Colombo Electoral District
- Polling Division: Colombo Central Polling Division

Area
  - Total: 0.55 km^{2} (0.21 sq mi)
- Elevation: 26 m (85 ft)

Population (2012)
  - Total: 13,436
  - Density: 24,429/km^{2} (63,270/sq mi)
- ISO 3166 code: LK-1103070

New Bazaar

New Bazaar Grama Niladhari Division is a Grama Niladhari Division of the Colombo Divisional Secretariat of Colombo District of Western Province, Sri Lanka.

R. Premadasa Stadium, Sugathadasa Stadium, St. Lucia's Cathedral, Roman Catholic Archdiocese of Colombo, St. Benedict's College, Colombo, St. Lucia's College, Colombo, Maligawatta, Hameed Al Husseinie College, Wolvendaal Church and Grand Mosque of Colombo are located within, nearby or associated with New Bazaar.

New Bazaar is a surrounded by the Grandpass South, Khettarama, Aluthkade East, Masangasweediya, Kotahena East and Bloemendhal Grama Niladhari Divisions.

== Demographics ==
=== Ethnicity ===
The New Bazaar Grama Niladhari Division has a Moor majority (65.6%), a significant Sri Lankan Tamil population (20.4%) and a significant Sinhalese population (12.2%). In comparison, the Colombo Divisional Secretariat (which contains the New Bazaar Grama Niladhari Division) has a Moor plurality (40.1%), a significant Sri Lankan Tamil population (31.1%) and a significant Sinhalese population (25.0%)

Ethnicity in New Bazaar
1. Moor (65.6%)
2. Sri Lankan Tamil (20.4%)
3. Sinhalese (12.2%)
4. Indian Tamil (1.00%)
5. Other (0.70%)

=== Religion ===
The New Bazaar Grama Niladhari Division has a Muslim majority (66.2%), a significant Hindu population (16.7%) and a significant Buddhist population (10.7%). In comparison, the Colombo Divisional Secretariat (which contains the New Bazaar Grama Niladhari Division) has a Muslim plurality (41.8%), a significant Hindu population (22.7%), a significant Buddhist population (19.0%) and a significant Roman Catholic population (13.1%)

Religion in New Bazaar
1. Muslim (66.2%)
2. Hindu (16.7%)
3. Buddhist (10.7%)
4. Roman Catholic (5.00%)
5. Other Christian (1.30%)
6. Other (0.10%)

== Gallery ==
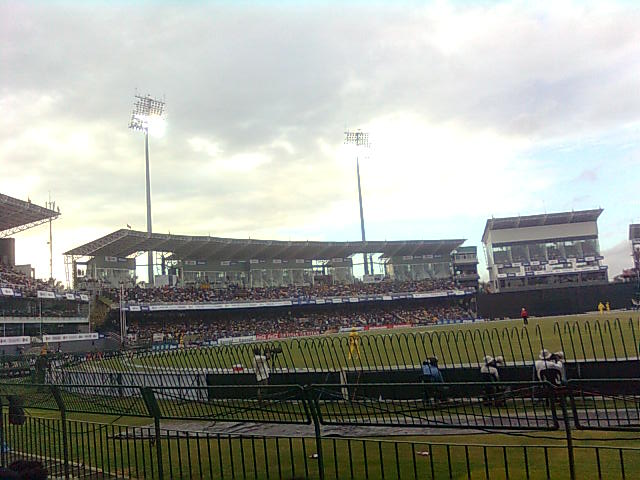
R. Premadasa Stadium

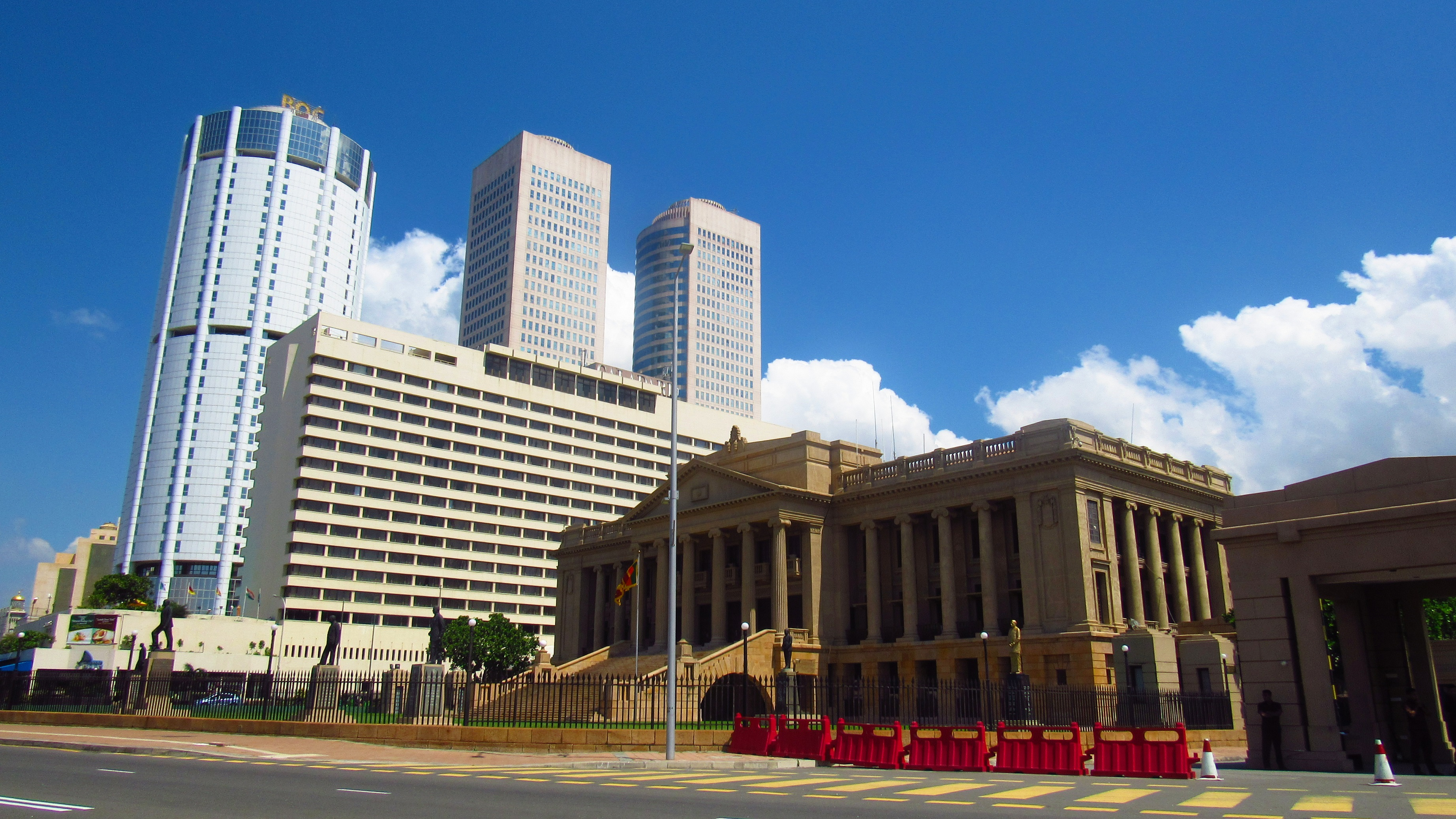
Sugathadasa Stadium

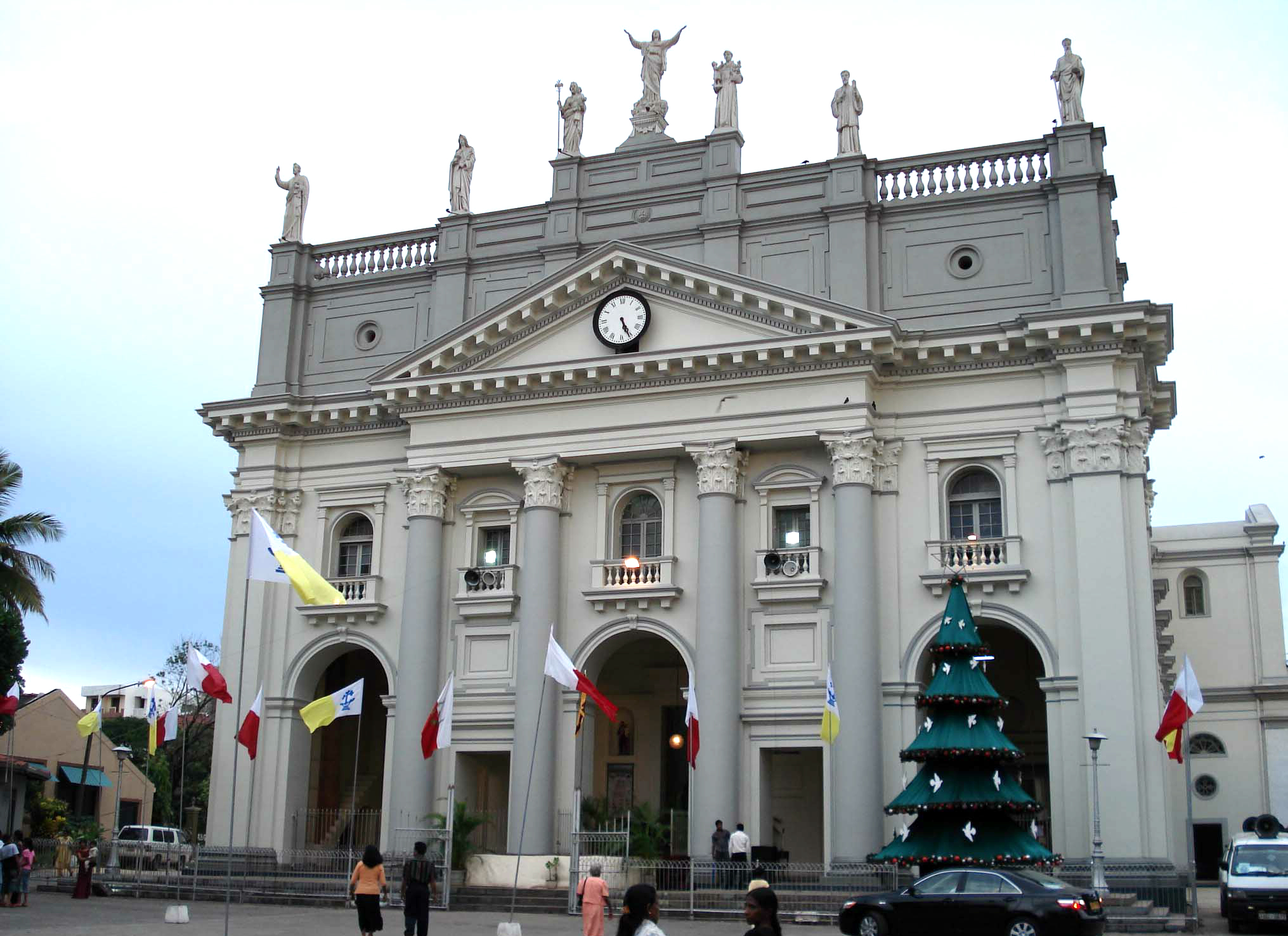
St. Lucia's Cathedral

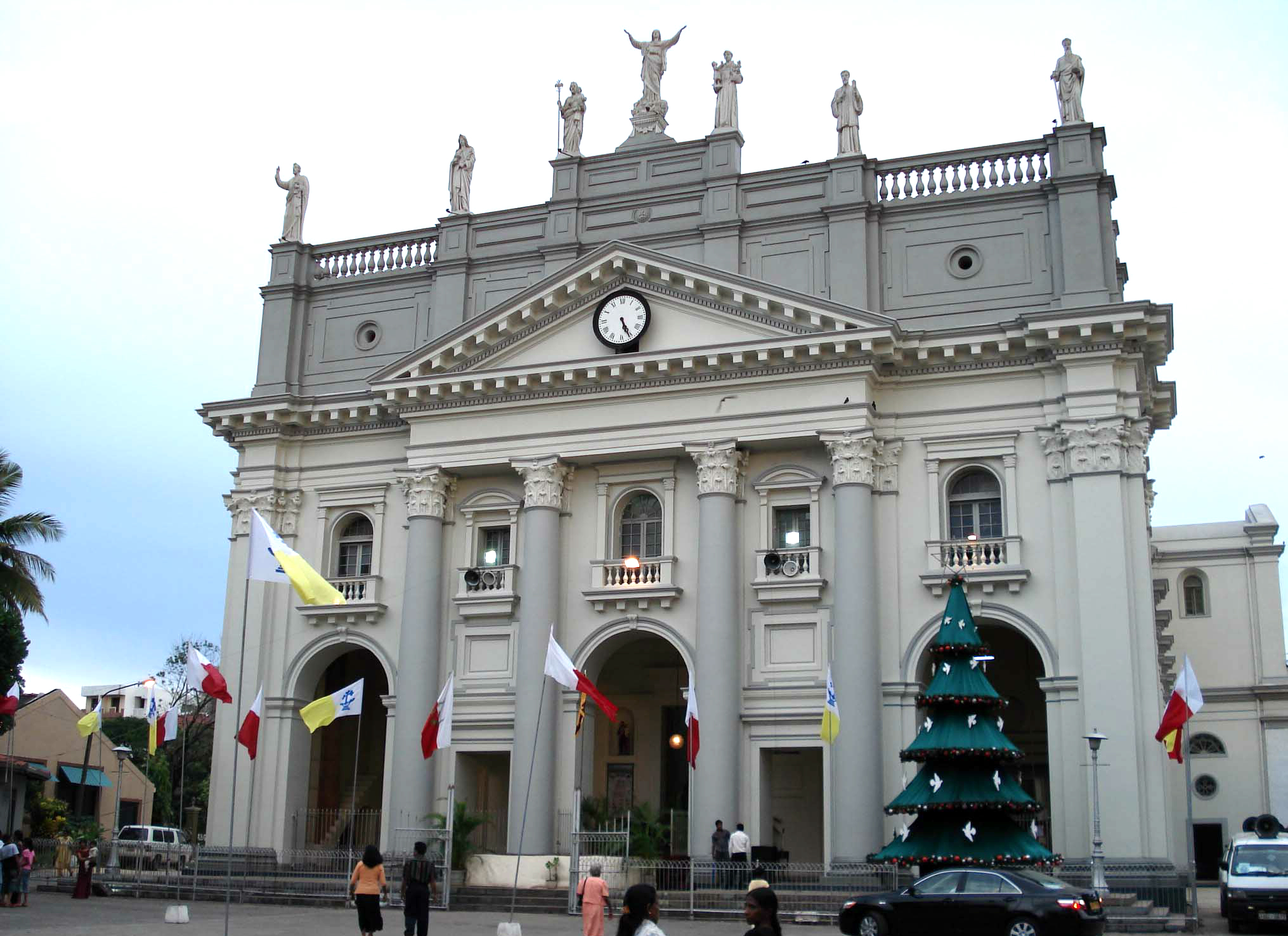
Roman Catholic Archdiocese of Colombo

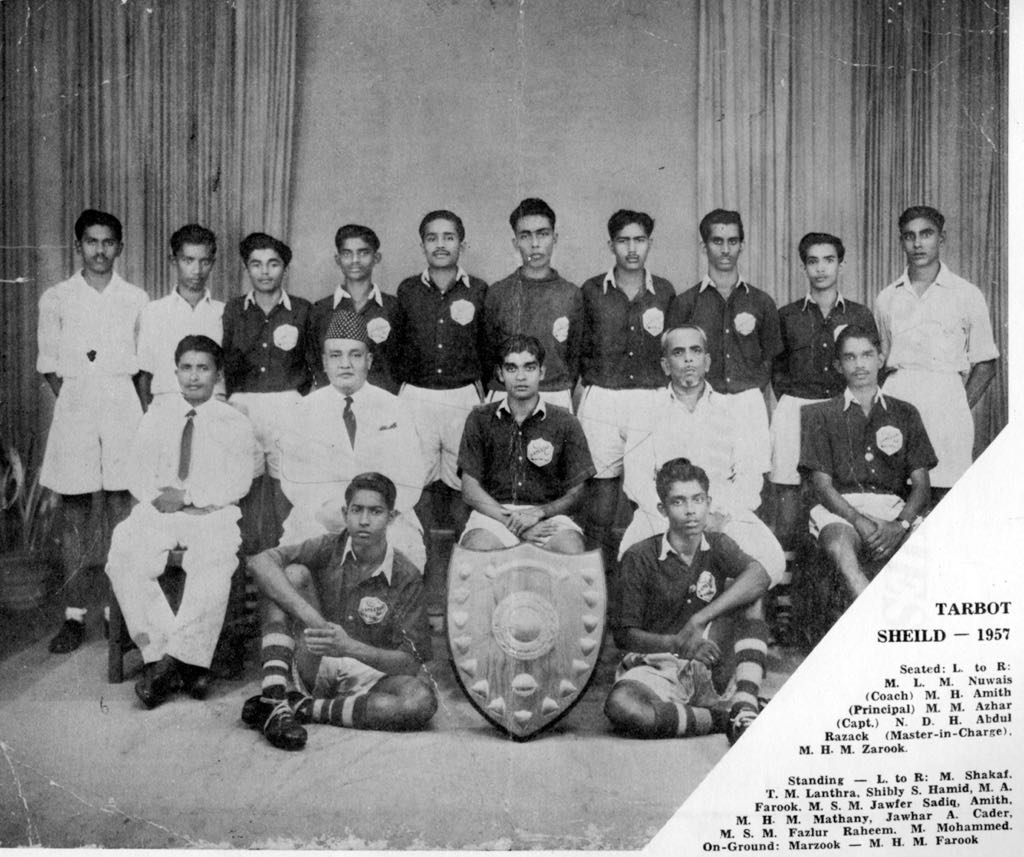
Hameed Al Husseinie College

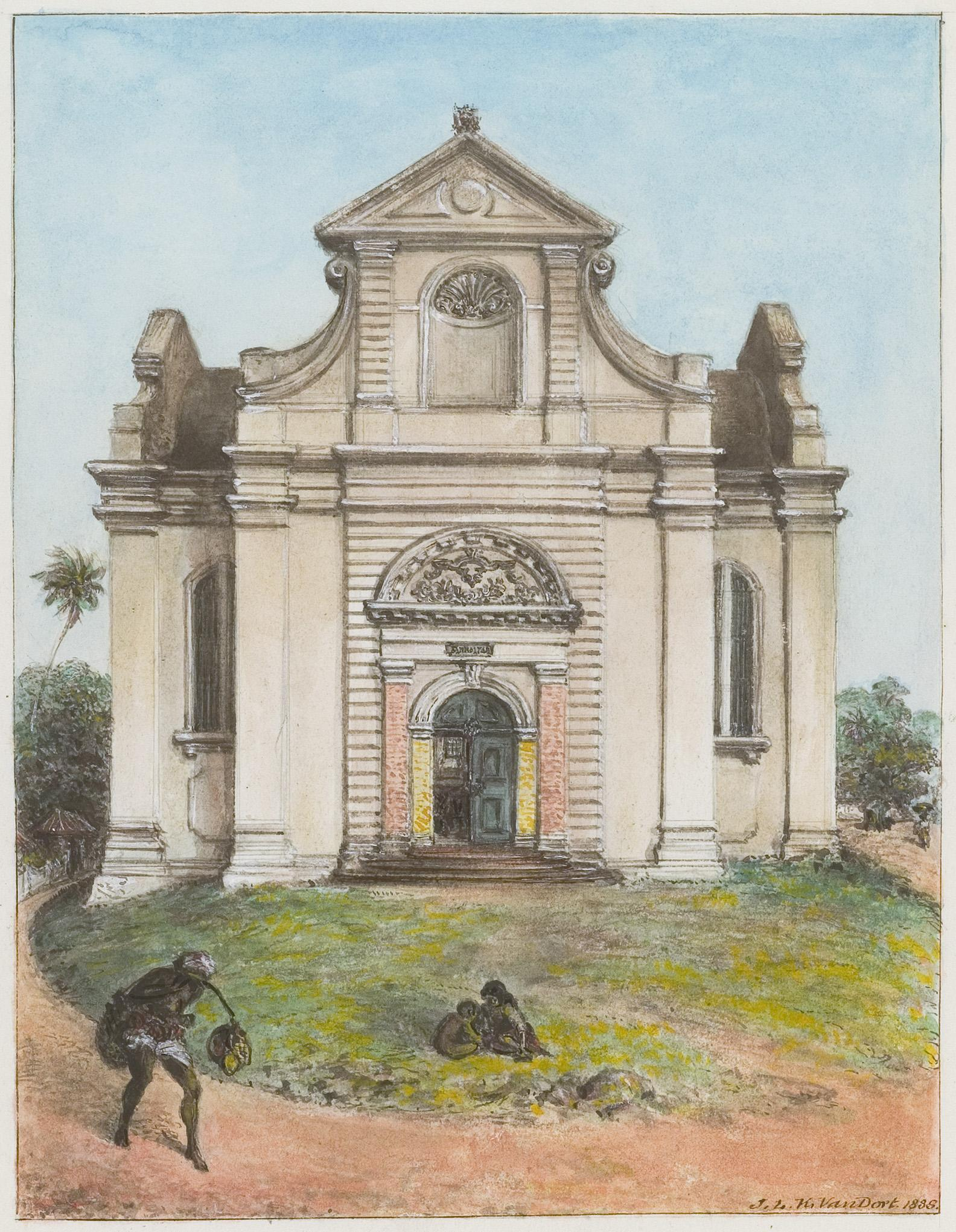
Wolvendaal Church

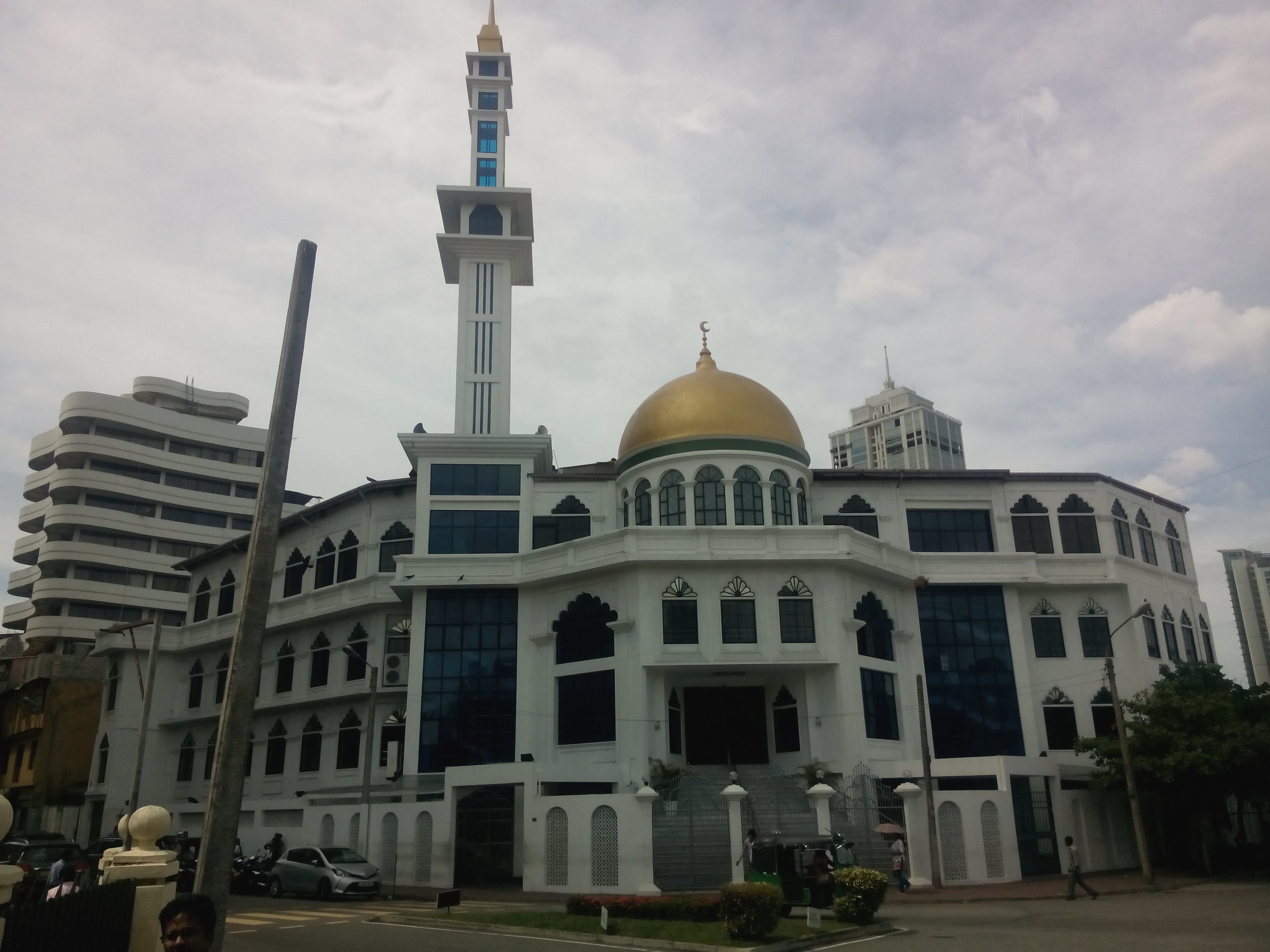
Grand Mosque of Colombo
