= Sammanthranapura Grama Niladhari Division =

Sammanthranapura
- Grama Niladhari Division
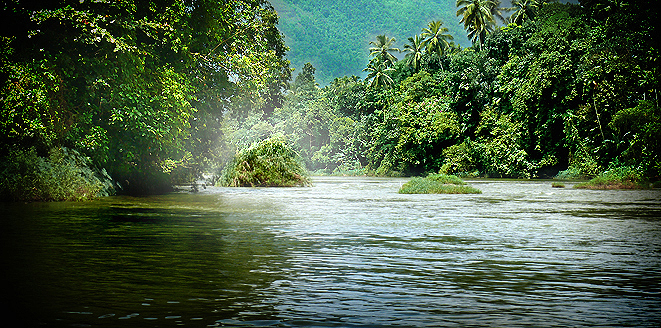
- Kelani River is located within, nearby or associated with the Sammanthranapura Grama Niladhari Division
- Interactive map of Sammanthranapura
- Coordinates: 6.978419°N 79.878369°E
- Country: Sri Lanka
- Province: Western Province
- District: Colombo District
- Divisional Secretariat: Colombo Divisional Secretariat
- Electoral District: Colombo Electoral District
- Polling Division: Colombo North Polling Division

Area
  - Total: 0.19 km^{2} (0.073 sq mi)
- Elevation: 37 m (121 ft)

Population (2012)
  - Total: 7,829
  - Density: 41,205/km^{2} (106,720/sq mi)
- ISO 3166 code: LK-1103005

Sammanthranapura

Sammanthranapura Grama Niladhari Division is a Grama Niladhari Division of the Colombo Divisional Secretariat of Colombo District of Western Province, Sri Lanka.

Wattala and Kelani River are located within, nearby or associated with Sammanthranapura.

Sammanthranapura is a surrounded by the Hekitta and Mattakkuliya Grama Niladhari Divisions.

== Demographics ==
=== Ethnicity ===
The Sammanthranapura Grama Niladhari Division has a Sinhalese plurality (41.1%), a significant Sri Lankan Tamil population (35.7%) and a significant Moor population (21.5%). In comparison, the Colombo Divisional Secretariat (which contains the Sammanthranapura Grama Niladhari Division) has a Moor plurality (40.1%), a significant Sri Lankan Tamil population (31.1%) and a significant Sinhalese population (25.0%)

Ethnicity in Sammanthranapura
1. Sinhalese (41.1%)
2. Sri Lankan Tamil (35.7%)
3. Moor (21.5%)
4. Indian Tamil (1.00%)
5. Other (0.70%)

=== Religion ===
The Sammanthranapura Grama Niladhari Division has a Buddhist plurality (34.3%), a significant Muslim population (23.8%), a significant Hindu population (21.0%) and a significant Roman Catholic population (13.3%). In comparison, the Colombo Divisional Secretariat (which contains the Sammanthranapura Grama Niladhari Division) has a Muslim plurality (41.8%), a significant Hindu population (22.7%), a significant Buddhist population (19.0%) and a significant Roman Catholic population (13.1%)

Religion in Sammanthranapura
1. Buddhist (34.3%)
2. Muslim (23.8%)
3. Hindu (21.0%)
4. Roman Catholic (13.3%)
5. Other Christian (7.50%)
6. Other (0.10%)

== Gallery ==
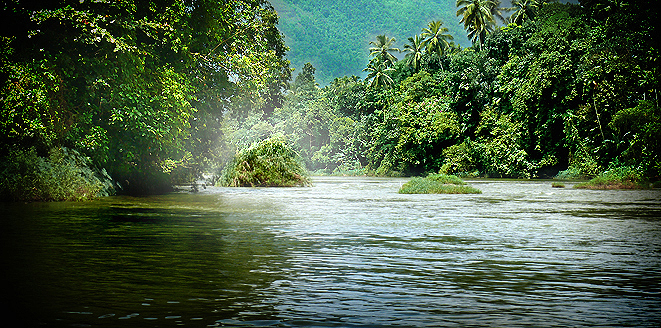
Kelani River
