= C. D. Ranasinghe =

Sri Lanka Army General

Major General C. D. Ranasinghe RWP, RSP is a retired general in the Sri Lanka Army. He was Deputy Chief of Staff of the Army. Prior to this new appointment, he served as the Commander, Security Forces-Wanni. He is the Colonel Commandant of Sri Lanka Army Women’s Corps.

== Early life and education ==
Ranasinghe had completed his primary education from St. Lucia's College, Colombo and higher education from Pannipitiya Dharmapala Vidyalaya. He joined the Army as an Officer Cadet in 1987 and was commissioned as a Second Lieutenant into one of the most respected Infantry Regiments in the Sri Lanka Army, the Gajaba Regiment on 10 December 1988.

== Military career ==
In January 2021, Ranasinghe were appointed Chief Coordinators of Batticaloa districts for controlling COVID-19 pandemic. He promoted to Brigadier rank in 2019. He was promoted to the rank of Major General on 1 October 2020. Then he posted as 38th Commandant of Infantry Training Centre (ITC), Minneriya. Ranasinghe retired from active service on 27 October 2023.
