= Information technology in Sri Lanka =

Information technology in Sri Lanka refers to business process outsourcing, knowledge process outsourcing, software development, IT Services, and IT education in Sri Lanka. Sri Lanka is always ranked among the top 50 outsourcing destinations by AT Kearney, and Colombo and ranked among "Top 20 Emerging Cities" by Global Services Magazine. The export revenue of this industry grew from US$213 million in 2007 to US$1.2 billion in 2021.

== History ==
For the purpose of developing IT in Sri Lanka, Computer Society of Sri Lanka was started in 1976. Sri Lanka's IT, KPO/BPO industry has a short span of history starting around 2000. IT/BPO sector has been identified as a priority sector for economic development in the country.

== Business process outsourcing ==
Sri Lanka is an offshore development center and Joint venture hub for several Fortune 500 companies from North America, UK, Australia, Sweden, Norway and Japan. Well known customers of Sri Lankan BPO industry include Google, J.P. Morgan & Co, Microsoft, Emirates, Infor and Qatar Airways.

=== Rankings ===
Publication	Publisher	Rank
Location Trends Reports	IBM	12
Global Services Location Index	AT Kearney	within top 25
Leading Locations For Offshore Services	Gartner	within top 30
Global Centers of Excellence for Finance & Accounting Outsourcing	Global Services	within top 19
Emerging Global Cities For Finance & Accounting Outsourcing	Tholons	7
Outsourcing Destination of the Year	National Outsourcing Association	1

=== Government Bodies ===
The prominent government body related to IT in Sri Lanka is the Ministry of Technology. Other than that Ministries of Education, Skills development are working on developing the education while Ministry of Industry and Commerce is on industrial level activities.

=== Revenue Statistics ===
Year	Total Export Revenue of ICT/ BPM ==== (in million. US$) ====
2018	▲$1,035.00
2019	▲$1,089.00
2020	▼$1,011.00
2021	▲$1,217.00
2022	
2023	▲$1,226.87
2024	▲$1,454.46
2025	▲$1,644.83

=== Legislation ===
IT in Sri Lanka is governed under the Information and Communication Technology Act No. 27 of 2003.

Other Related Acts

1. Electronic Transactions Act, No. 19 OF 2006
2. National Digital Policy for Sri Lanka
3. Data Protection Bill
4. Telecommunication Levy Act, No. 21 OF 2011
5. Telecommunication Levy Act(Amendment) Act, No. 8 OF 2013

=== Agencies ===
1. The Information and Communication Technology Agency (Sri Lanka)
2. Sri Lanka Computer Emergency Readiness Team (SLCERT)
3. Telecommunications Regulatory Commission of Sri Lanka (TRCSL)

=== Organisations ===
1. Sri Lanka Association of Software and Service Companies (SLASSCOM) similar to India's NASSCOM is another agency working on the development of business, education and employment.
1. The Federation of Information Technology Industry Sri Lanka (FITIS)
2. The ICT Industry Skills Council (ICTISC)

== Recent development ==
There are many global IT services companies established in Sri Lanka such as HSBC, IFS, Intel, Motorola, WNS, RR Donnelley, Virtusa, Pearsons and Accenture.

=== IT parks ===
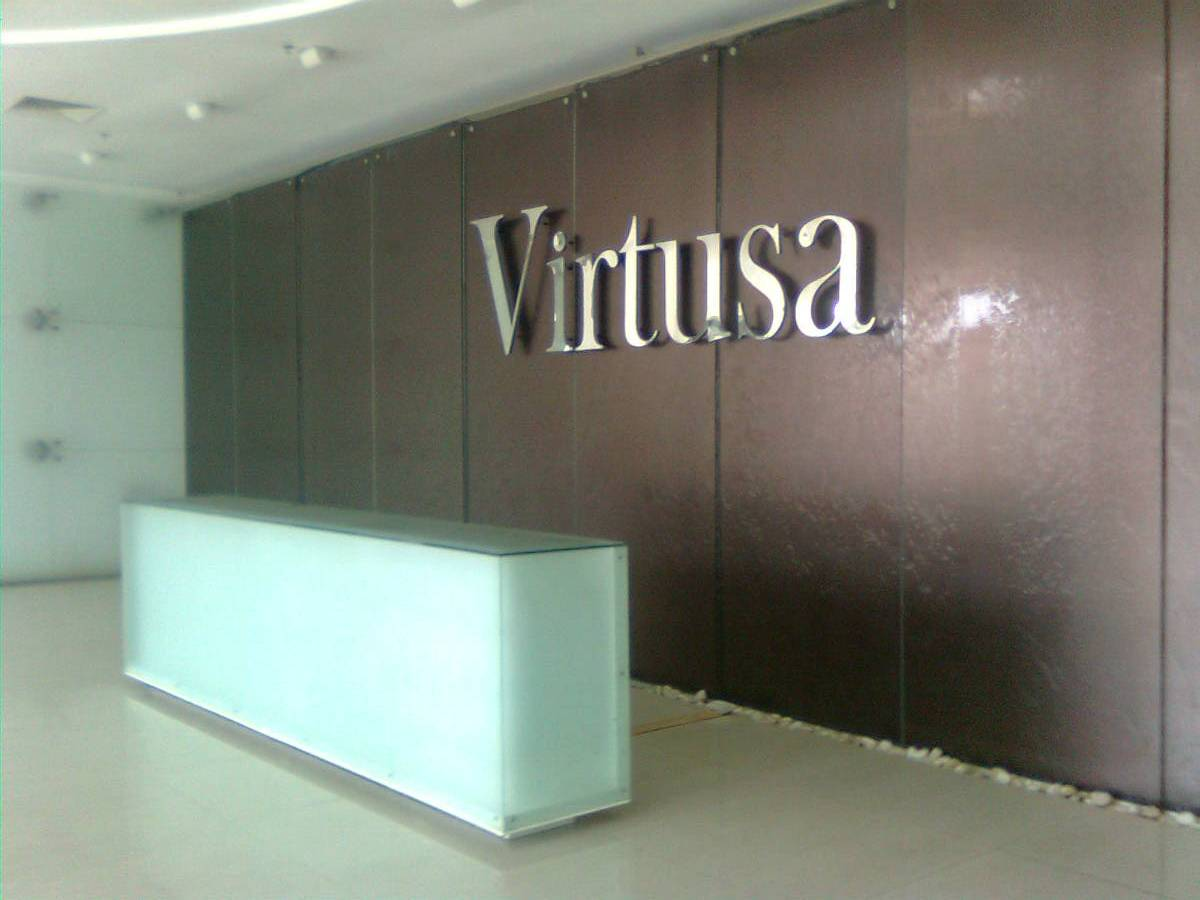
Virtusa At Orion Cirt IT Park

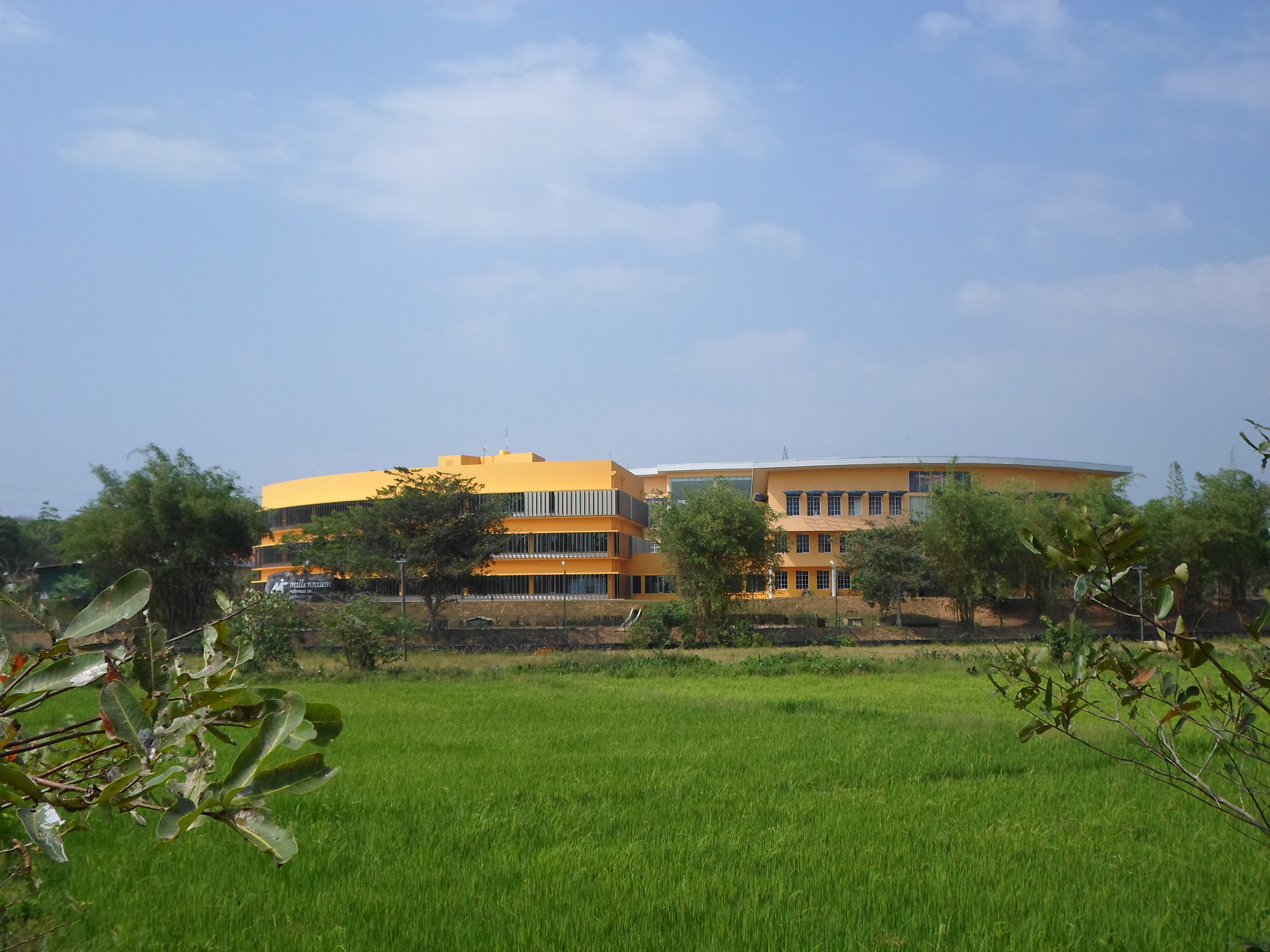
Millennium Information Technologies Campus At Malabe

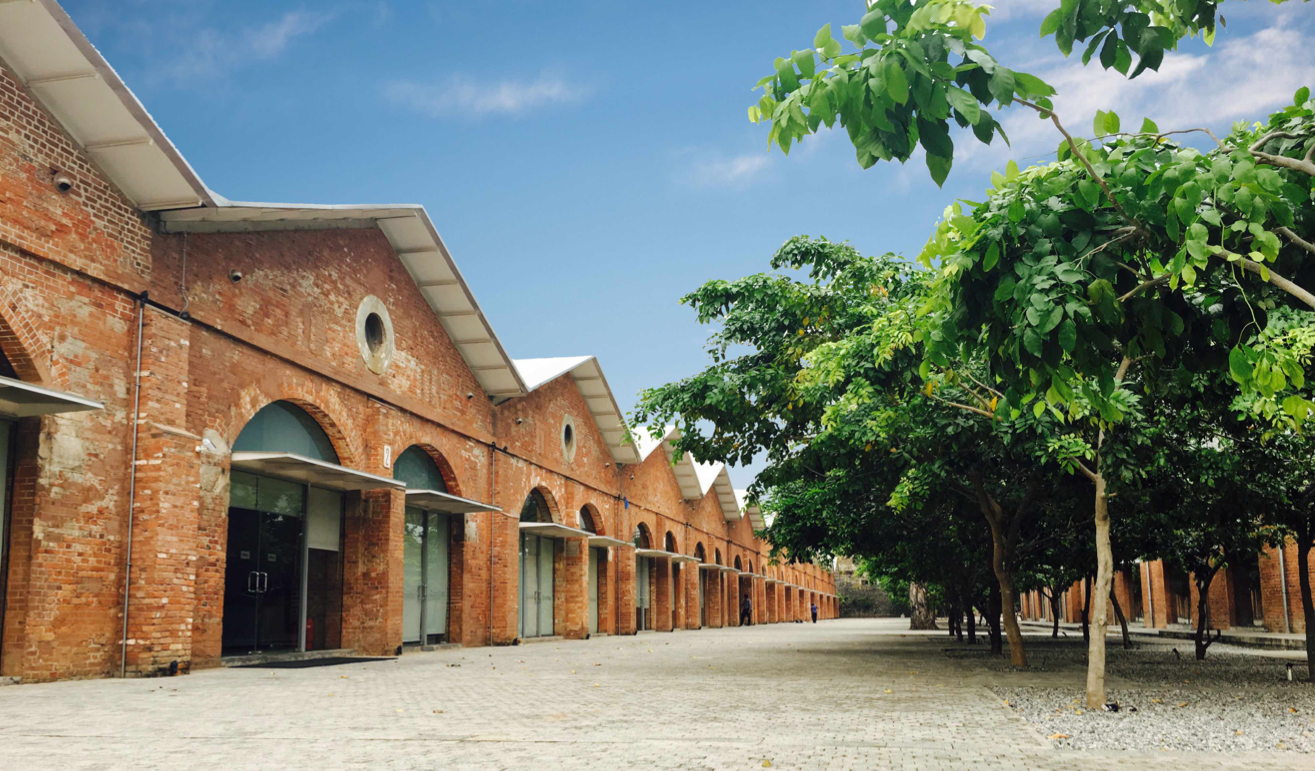
Trace Expert City

Sri Lanka has few government owned and privately managed IT Parks.

Orion City IT Park established in 2009 is a privately owned IT park situated in Dematagoda area in Colombo. The Park is spread over 16 acres and currently has 800,000 sq feet of developed space. Currently this park houses, Virtusa, IFS AB, WNS Global Services and several other IT and non-IT companies.

In 2011 a full featured IT park was proposed to be built at Hambantota as a government project. In 2012 this project was approved by the Cabinet.

TRACE Expert City is a similar project, developed by the Urban Development Authority, working with the Ministry of Defense. It is situated in Maradana.

In February 2016 India's External Affairs Minister Sushma Swaraj announced that they are offering an IT park for Sri Lanka considering the IT industry's importance in the country.

== Employment ==
According to the National ICT workforce Survey 2013, the positive domestic developments and gradual recovery of the global economic situation have created a conducive environment for growth of the industry's workforce and the projection figure shows that this trend is likely to continue. The overall workforce has grown to 75,107 in 2013 with a projection. In 2013, 63% of the workforce held graduate or post-graduate level qualifications.

The IT industry has become one of the largest sectors in producing employment opportunities in Sri Lanka by creating thousands of IT job openings. Notably, many foreign IT companies start production officers in Sri Lanka due to the wide availability high quality skilled resources and relatively low operational costs.

== IT education ==
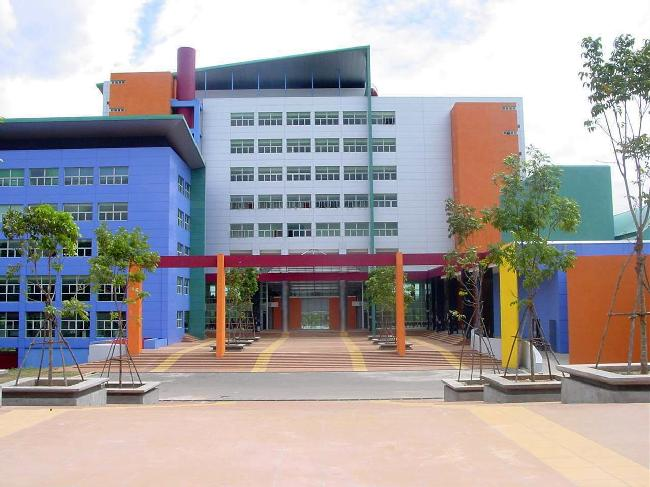
Sri Lanka Institute of Information Technology

=== Secondary Education ===
In the national level curriculum, first computer related subject taught at public schools is Information and Communication Technology. This is an elective subject for GCE Ordinary Level in Sri Lanka. For GCE Advanced Level in Sri Lanka a compulsory subject and an exam called General Information Technology was introduced considering the need of IT literacy for every student. Under the technology stream introduced for GCE Advanced Level in past years a new main subject for IT, Information and Communication Technology is added.

=== Higher Education ===
With the rapid development of IT industry and increasing job demand in the 1990s, steps were taken by both government and private sector to improve the IT education across the country.

== See also ==
- Economy of Sri Lanka
- Knowledge economy
- Outsourcing
- Sri Lanka Institute of Information Technology
