= Trace City =

Technology & Innovation Park in Colombo 10, Sri Lanka

TRACE Expert City
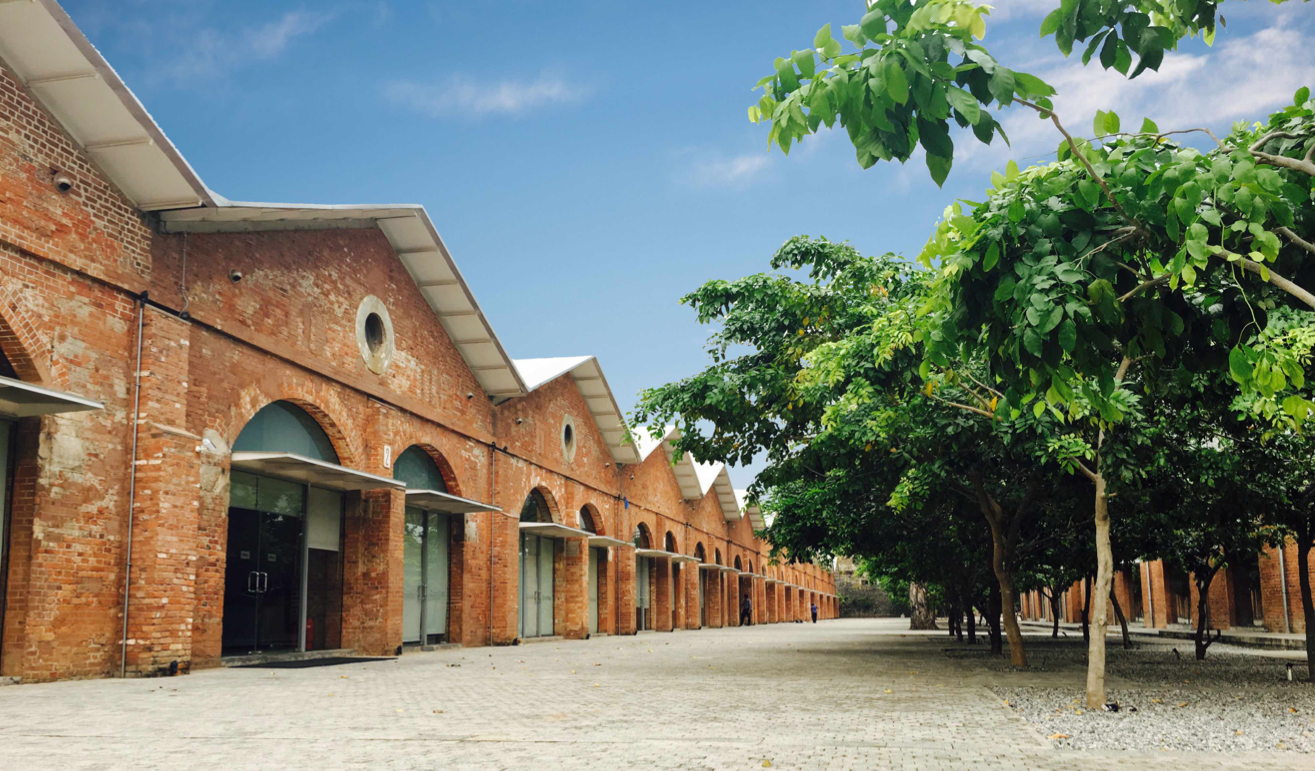
- The main 13-bay building

- Location within Central Colombo
- Alternative names: Trace City

General information
- Location: Maradana, Colombo, Sri Lanka
- Coordinates: 06°55′48″N 79°51′43″E
- Current tenants: CodeGen, Vega Innovations, LSEG, Calcey, SLTC, Jendo Innovations, Orel Corporation, Nagarro, Effective Solutions, SLTMobitel Innovation Center and others
- Opened: 28 July 2014

Renovating team
- Architect: Thisara Thanapathy

Website
- trace.lk

TRACE Expert City or simply TRACE City in short, is one of largest Technology & Innovation Parks in Sri Lanka. It was formerly the Tripoli Market Square, an 18th-century complex of derelict British warehouse buildings.

TEC consists of three renovated buildings. The southernmost building is a dual-gable-roofed structure that houses a shared cafeteria and offices belonging to the London Stock Exchange Group. The main central building consists of thirteen parallel warehouse bays, and houses much of the rentable 5,000 square feet (460 m^{2}) TRACE Auditorium, and offices including that of CodeGen. Vega, Calcey, Effective Solutions, GLX, Jendo, Neo Ventures, SLTC and NCinga. The northernmost building, or "Exchange House", is a single gable-roofed structure that houses further offices belonging to the London Stock Exchange Group.

TRACE (Technologically Re-awaken A Culture of Excellence) was developed with the support of the Urban Development Authority (UDA) and Industry partners, with the intention of promoting development through innovative technology. It was declared opened on 28 July 2014 by Gotabaya Rajapaksa, along with the Chairman of the UDA, Nimal Perera, dignitaries from the Sri Lankan Army, and the management of CodeGen.

== Future ==
The final phase of converting the former Tripoli Market to a multi-purpose complex involves the development of a combination of four high-rise and mid-rise buildings. In addition to office space, plans include recreational space, further parking, research facilities, a supermarket, and residential and hotel facilities.

== See also ==
- Information Technology in Sri Lanka
