= Kotahena =

Kotahena කොටහේන (Koṭahēna) கொட்டாஞ்சேனை (Koṭṭāñcēṉai)
- Suburb
- Location within Greater Colombo
- Coordinates: 6°56′34″N 79°51′31″E
- Country: Sri Lanka
- Province: Western Province
- District: Colombo District
- Time zone: UTC+5:30 (Sri Lanka Standard Time Zone)
- Postal Code: 01300

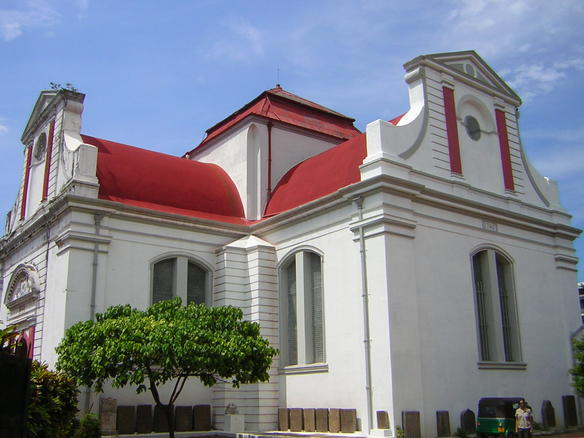
Wolfendahl Church

Kotahena is a suburb of Colombo, Sri Lanka, and is known as Colombo 13.

== Places of worship ==
Local houses of worship include:

- St. Lucia's Cathedral (1881), Catholic
- St. Anthony's Shrine, Catholic
- St. Thomas' Church, Anglican
- Wolvendaal Church, the oldest Protestant church in Sri Lanka, was built from 1749 to 1756.

== Sports venues ==
Kotahena is also home to the Sugathadasa Stadium, the country's national athletics stadium.

== Schools ==
- Cathedral Mix School
- Good Shepherd Convent
- Good Shepherd Girls Maha Vidyalaya
- Kotahena Muslim Vidiyalaya
- St. Anthony's Boys College
- St. Benedict's College
- St. Lucia's College
- Vivekananda College
- Wolvendhal Girls High School
