= St. Lucia's College, Colombo =

St. Lucia's College

Location
- Kotahena, Colombo 13; Sri Lanka
- Coordinates: 6°56′55.19″N 79°51′52.34″E

Information
- Type: National / Public
- Motto: Pro Deo et Patria (For God and Native Land)
- Established: 1880
- Founder: Rev. Fr. Thomas Cardinal Cooray
- Principal: Krishekeshan Dilshan
- Staff: 56
- Grades: 1 to 11 Local Syllabus
- Gender: Boys
- Age: 6 to 16
- Enrollment: 1100
- Language: Sinhala, Tamil
- Colours: Maroon and whiteite

St. Lucia's College (commonly known as St. Lucia's or Lucia's) is a Roman Catholic school located in Kotahena area of Colombo, Sri Lanka. This school was founded in 1880 and it is a Government School, managed by Ministry of Education (Sri Lanka), which provides primary and secondary education.

The School Motto both "Pro Deo et Patria" written in Latin phrase and "मेरा देवाय स स्वदेशाय।" (Swa devvaya sa swadeshaaya) written in Sanskrit phrase having same meaning as "For God and Country".

== Principals ==
- Jayantha Wickremasinghe

== Education ==
The school has Sinhala and Tamil mediums for Grade 1 to Grade 11 students. Recently the school is planning to start A/L classes.
