= St. Thomas' Church, Colombo =

St. Thomas' Church
- Malabar Episcopalian Church
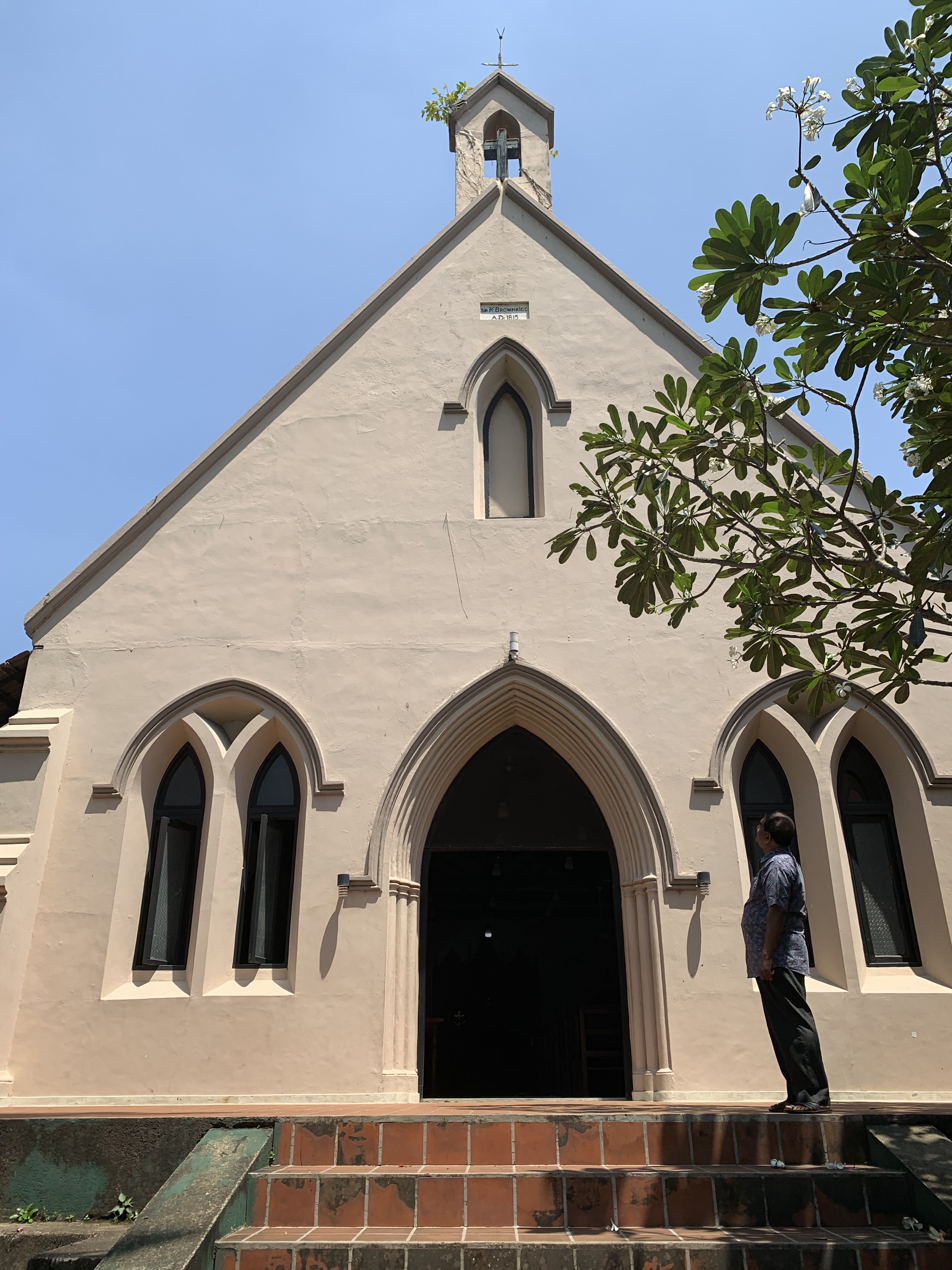

- Location within Central Colombo
- 6°56′34″N 79°51′31″E
- Location: Ginthupitiya, Colombo Sri Lanka
- Denomination: Anglican Church of Ceylon

History
- Status: Church
- Consecrated: 16 July 1816

Architecture
- Functional status: Active
- Groundbreaking: 1815

Administration
- Metropolis: Archbishop of Canterbury
- Diocese: Colombo

Clergy
- Vicar: Rev. D. K. Balakrishnan

St. Thomas' Church is situated in Kotahena (District 13) a suburb of Colombo, Sri Lanka. It is one of the oldest churches in Sri Lanka as now part of the Anglican Church of Ceylon.

St. Thomas Church was the first Anglican church built in Sri Lanka, it was constructed by Governor of Ceylon Sir Robert Brownrigg for the use by the local Tamil Christian (Malabar) population. The Malabars at the time were sharing St. Peter's Church, Colombo with the local Europeans. When their number increased to nearly 600 the Malabars collected approximately 860 rupees and approached the government, through Abraham Rodrigo Devanesan Mootookistna, the Mudaliyar interpreter to the governor, for assistance to erect their own church.

Brownrigg granted their request and gave orders for the erection of a church at Ginthupitiya, the site of a former Roman Catholic church, which was constructed by the Portuguese. Its presence was testified in the 16th century by Paulo da Trindade (1571-1651). Ginthupitiya was originally known as "San Thome Pitiya" by the Portuguese, who recorded finding a Nestorian cross in the area which they believed indicated an earlier presence of Persian Christians and possibly a site where Thomas the Apostle visited and delivered a sermon. The Dutch subsequently destroyed the church when they took over from the Portuguese. The Dutch made three segregated graveyards, one for their own countrymen, one for their local allies and one for the outsiders/non-conformists, known as "Genthos" in dutch, which led to the name of the area being changed from "San Thome Pitiya" to "Genthopitiya". Paul E. Pieris hypothesises, based on sources from Clevid's 1893 A Brief Sketch of the History of St Thomas Church hypothesises that 'San Thome' degenerated to 'Gin tun' and in turn to 'Gintu'.

The first church service was held on 16 July 1816, with the Rev. George Bisset conducting the Service, Rev. Thomas James Twisleton delivered the sermon and prayers were said in Tamil by G. J. Ondaatjie.

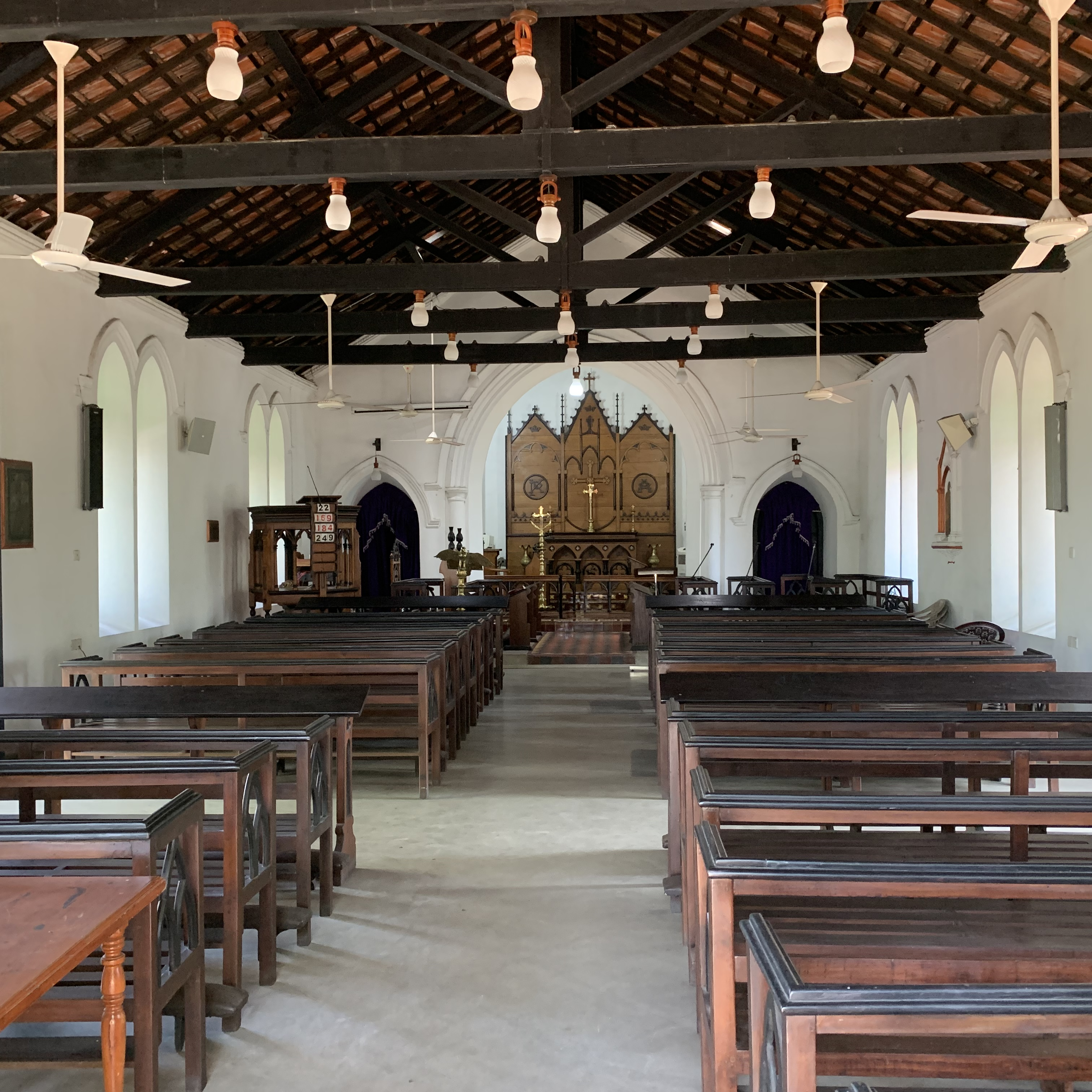

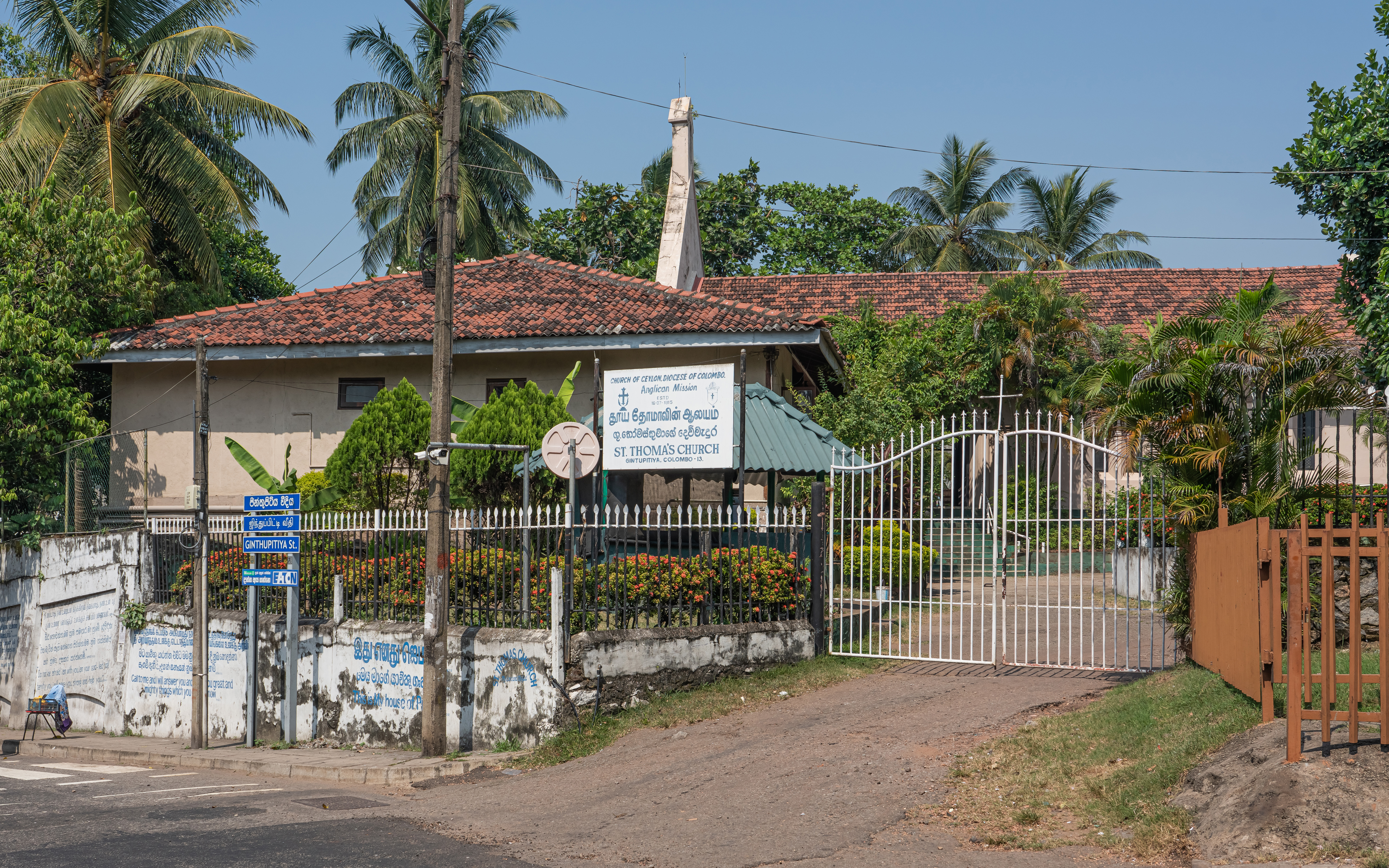

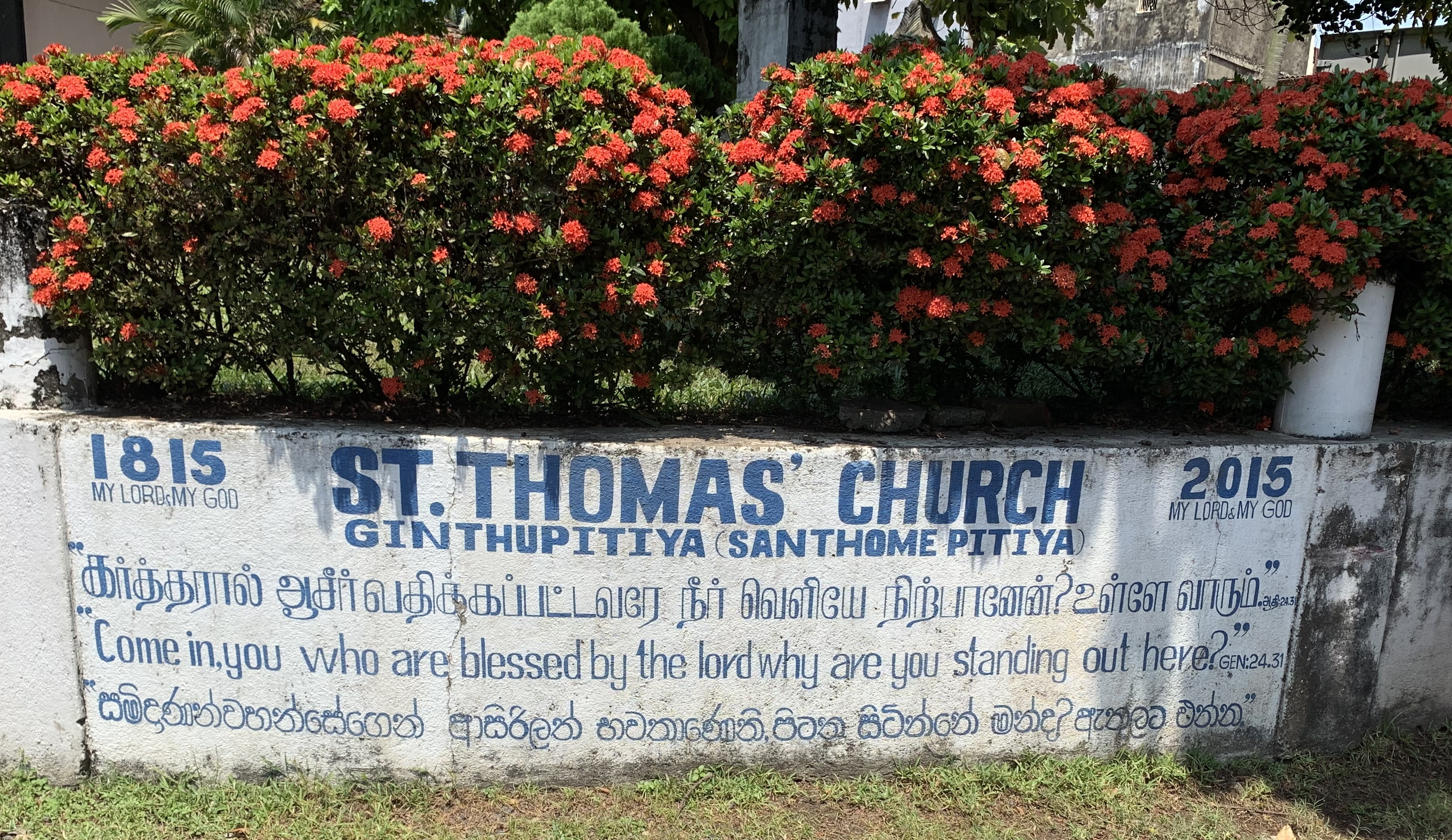

== See also ==
- Church of Ceylon
