= Grand Mosque of Colombo =

Mosque in Colombo, Sri Lanka

Grand Mosque of Colombo ﺍﻠﻤﺴﺠﺪ ﺍﻠﻛﺒﻴﺮﺒﻛﻮﻠﻮﻤﺒﻮ
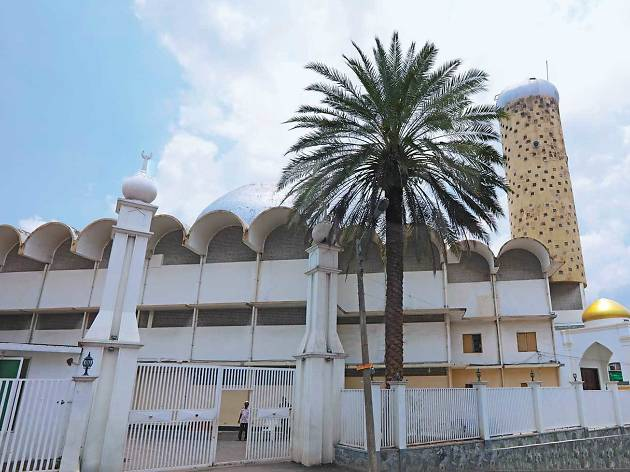

- Location within Central Colombo

Religion
- Affiliation: Islam

Location
- Location: 151, New Moor Street, Colombo 12.
- Coordinates: 6.9403765°N 79.8589955°E

Architecture
- Type: mosque
- Groundbreaking: c. 1820s

Website
- www.colombograndmosque.com

The Grand Mosque of Colombo is a mosque located in Colombo, Sri Lanka.

The mosque has a history that goes back over 1200 years. The earliest European reference to the mosque appears in a description from November 1505 when the commander of a Portuguese expedition anchored in Colombo bay. In 1520 following an attack on the Portuguese trading post, established earlier by Lopo de Brito, the Captain of Portuguese Ceylon, the King Bhuvanaikabahu of Kotte burnt the town (Colombo) along with two large mosques. The mosque was however rebuilt on the same site soon after. In the 1820s, the mosque was redesigned and rebuilt by Malay architect, Muhammad Balangkaya, the son of a Malay noble of the Royal House of Gowa (present-day Sulawesi, Indonesia), who was exiled to Ceylon in 1790 by the Dutch. The mosque was rebuilt as a two-storey structure, one of the first of its kind. In 1826 the British Governor of Ceylon, Edward Barnes, visited the mosque and commended the architect on the excellence of his work. In 1827 Sir Alexander Johnston discovered an Arabic inscribed tombstone dating to 948AD, which had been moved by the Dutch from the old Muslim cemetery next to the Grand Mosque, which indicates the mosque may be over 1,100 years old and possibly the oldest mosque in Sri Lanka.

In 1897 an additional wing was constructed under the supervision of I. L. M. H. Muhammad Mohideen. The wing was used in 1959 as classrooms for the newly established school, Al-Madrasathul Hameedia.was Constructed by Sultaan Abdul Hamid the Second of the Ottoman Empire In 1921 the name of the school was changed to the Hameedia Boys' English School. The mosque was reconstructed again during 1900s to meet the modern needs of the Muslim community.

The mosque contains the shrine of the Malay saint, Bahu-Uddeen Tuan Bagoos Balankaya.

== Trustees and Treasurers ==
=== Trustees ===
- 1918–1920: I. L. M. H. Muhammad Mohideen
- 1920–1925: H. N. H. Jalaldeen
- 1925–1940: S. L. Mahmood
- 1940–?: M. Ghouse Mohideen
- 2009–2014: A. M. M. Rauf

=== Treasurers ===
- 1918–1933: W.M. Mohamado Usooff
- 1933–1940: W.M.A. Wahid
- 1940–1957: W.M. Abdul Jabbar
- 1958–?: A.J.M. Ariff
