= Colombo Central Polling Division =

Colombo Central
- Polling Division
- Coordinates: 6.942177°N 79.846815°E
- Country: Sri Lanka
- Province: Western Province, Sri Lanka
- Electoral District: Colombo Electoral District

Area
  - Total: 13.75 km^{2} (5.31 sq mi)

Population (2012)
  - Total: 201,620
  - Density: 14,663/km^{2} (37,980/sq mi)
- ISO 3166 code: EC-01B

The Colombo Central Polling Division is a Polling Division in the Colombo Electoral District, in the Western Province, Sri Lanka.

== Presidential Election Results ==
=== Summary ===
The winner of Colombo Central has matched the final country result 4 out of 8 times.

Year	Colombo Central	Colombo Electoral District	MAE %	Sri Lanka	MAE %
2019	NDF	SLPP	35.80%	SLPP	34.89%
2015	NDF	NDF	25.41%	NDF	29.69%
2010	NDF	UPFA	29.70%	UPFA	34.67%
2005	UNP	UNP	27.30%	UPFA	29.68%
1999	UNP	PA	13.70%	PA	15.28%
1994	PA	PA	3.19%	PA	0.77%
1988	UNP	UNP	16.08%	UNP	14.84%
1982	UNP	UNP	13.42%	UNP	16.73%
Matches/Mean MAE	4/8	7/8	20.57%	8/8	22.07%

=== 2019 Sri Lankan Presidential Election ===
Party	Colombo Central		Colombo Electoral District		Sri Lanka	
Party	Votes	%	Votes	%	Votes	%
NDF	80,076	80.33%	559,921	40.92%	5,564,239	41.99%
SLPP	16,341	16.39%	727,713	53.19%	6,924,255	52.25%
Other Parties (with < 1%)	1,735	1.74%	26,740	1.95%	345,452	2.61%
NMPP	1,528	1.53%	53,803	3.93%	418,553	3.16%
Valid Votes	99,680	98.85%	1,368,177	98.89%	13,252,499	98.99%
Rejected Votes	1,156	1.15%	15,333	1.11%	135,452	1.01%
Total Polled	100,836	81.09%	1,383,510	82.82%	13,387,951	83.71%
Registered Electors	124,354		1,670,403		15,992,568	

=== 2015 Sri Lankan Presidential Election ===
Party	Colombo Central		Colombo Electoral District		Sri Lanka	
Party	Votes	%	Votes	%	Votes	%
NDF	82,495	81.28%	725,073	55.93%	6,217,162	51.28%
UPFA	17,779	17.52%	562,614	43.40%	5,768,090	47.58%
Other Parties (with < 1%)	1,223	1.20%	8,673	0.67%	138,200	1.14%
Valid Votes	101,497	98.80%	1,296,360	98.83%	12,123,452	98.85%
Rejected Votes	1,237	1.20%	15,334	1.17%	140,925	1.15%
Total Polled	102,734	78.14%	1,311,694	81.34%	12,264,377	78.69%
Registered Electors	131,482		1,612,660		15,585,942	

=== 2010 Sri Lankan Presidential Election ===
Party	Colombo Central		Colombo Electoral District		Sri Lanka	
Party	Votes	%	Votes	%	Votes	%
NDF	73,152	75.55%	533,022	45.90%	4,173,185	40.15%
UPFA	21,824	22.54%	614,740	52.93%	6,015,934	57.88%
Other Parties (with < 1%)	1,850	1.91%	13,620	1.17%	204,494	1.97%
Valid Votes	96,826	98.66%	1,161,382	99.03%	10,393,613	99.03%
Rejected Votes	1,320	1.34%	11,394	0.97%	101,838	0.97%
Total Polled	98,146	70.19%	1,172,776	76.09%	10,495,451	66.70%
Registered Electors	139,822		1,541,242		15,734,587	

=== 2005 Sri Lankan Presidential Election ===
Party	Colombo Central		Colombo Electoral District		Sri Lanka	
Party	Votes	%	Votes	%	Votes	%
UNP	78,908	78.57%	569,627	51.12%	4,706,366	48.43%
UPFA	20,395	20.31%	534,431	47.96%	4,887,152	50.29%
Other Parties (with < 1%)	1,121	1.12%	10,192	0.91%	123,521	1.27%
Valid Votes	100,424	98.42%	1,114,250	98.86%	9,717,039	98.88%
Rejected Votes	1,616	1.58%	12,879	1.14%	109,869	1.12%
Total Polled	102,040	70.41%	1,127,129	75.85%	9,826,908	69.51%
Registered Electors	144,916		1,486,021		14,136,979	

=== 1999 Sri Lankan Presidential Election ===
Party	Colombo Central		Colombo Electoral District		Sri Lanka	
Party	Votes	%	Votes	%	Votes	%
UNP	59,234	60.11%	425,185	44.08%	3,602,748	42.71%
PA	35,416	35.94%	474,310	49.18%	4,312,157	51.12%
JVP	1,955	1.98%	44,009	4.56%	343,927	4.08%
Other Parties (with < 1%)	1,930	1.96%	21,030	2.18%	176,679	2.09%
Valid Votes	98,535	97.42%	964,534	97.06%	8,435,754	97.69%
Rejected Votes	2,605	2.58%	29,197	2.94%	199,536	2.31%
Total Polled	101,140	70.24%	993,731	73.39%	8,635,290	72.17%
Registered Electors	143,993		1,354,025		11,965,536	

=== 1994 Sri Lankan Presidential Election ===
Party	Colombo Central		Colombo Electoral District		Sri Lanka	
Party	Votes	%	Votes	%	Votes	%
PA	56,219	61.78%	557,708	64.82%	4,709,205	62.28%
UNP	33,824	37.17%	288,741	33.56%	2,715,283	35.91%
Other Parties (with < 1%)	956	1.05%	13,937	1.62%	137,040	1.81%
Valid Votes	90,999	97.83%	860,386	98.17%	7,561,526	98.03%
Rejected Votes	2,020	2.17%	16,060	1.83%	151,706	1.97%
Total Polled	93,019	66.91%	876,446	69.59%	7,713,232	69.12%
Registered Electors	139,012		1,259,484		11,158,880	

=== 1988 Sri Lankan Presidential Election ===
Party	Colombo Central		Colombo Electoral District		Sri Lanka	
Party	Votes	%	Votes	%	Votes	%
UNP	58,795	65.77%	361,337	49.14%	2,569,199	50.43%
SLFP	26,083	29.18%	339,958	46.23%	2,289,857	44.95%
SLMP	4,521	5.06%	34,020	4.63%	235,701	4.63%
Valid Votes	89,399	98.27%	735,315	98.49%	5,094,754	98.24%
Rejected Votes	1,572	1.73%	11,295	1.51%	91,499	1.76%
Total Polled	90,971	67.93%	746,610	67.53%	5,186,256	55.87%
Registered Electors	133,920		1,105,583		9,283,143	

=== 1982 Sri Lankan Presidential Election ===
Party	Colombo Central		Colombo Electoral District		Sri Lanka	
Party	Votes	%	Votes	%	Votes	%
UNP	68,346	72.81%	436,290	57.86%	3,450,815	52.93%
SLFP	22,061	23.50%	274,476	36.40%	2,546,348	39.05%
JVP	2,121	2.26%	28,580	3.79%	273,428	4.19%
Other Parties (with < 1%)	1,335	1.42%	14,685	1.95%	249,460	3.83%
Valid Votes	93,863	99.22%	754,031	98.95%	6,520,156	98.78%
Rejected Votes	740	0.78%	7,990	1.05%	80,470	1.22%
Total Polled	94,603	74.23%	762,021	76.88%	6,600,626	80.15%
Registered Electors	127,452		991,194		8,235,358	

== Parliamentary Election Results ==
=== Summary ===
The winner of Colombo Central has matched the final country result 3 out of 7 times.

Year	Colombo Central	Colombo Electoral District	MAE %	Sri Lanka	MAE %
2024	NPP	NPP	-	NPP	-
2020	SJB	SLPFA	-	SLPFA	-
2015	UNP	UNP	27.74%	UNP	30.84%
2010	UNP	UPFA	22.86%	UPFA	30.37%
2004	UNP	UNP	22.52%	UPFA	25.73%
2001	UNP	UNP	18.13%	UNP	21.21%
2000	UNP	UNP	13.57%	PA	18.28%
1994	UNP	PA	8.18%	PA	6.13%
1989	UNP	UNP	8.63%	UNP	9.76%
Matches/Mean MAE	4/9	7/9	-	9/9	-

=== 2024 Sri Lankan parliamentary election ===
Party	Colombo Central		Colombo Electoral District		Sri Lanka	
Party	Votes	%	Votes	%	Votes	%
JJB	39,160	51.47%	788,636	68.63%	6,863,186	61.56%
SJB	27,347	35.94%	208,249	18.12%	1,968,716	17.66%
NDF	3,612	4.75%	51,020	4.44%	500,835	4.49%
SLPP	923	1.21%	34,880	3.04%	350.429	3.14%
Other Parties (with < 1%)	5,966	6.62%	22,553	1.9%	1,227,859	11.02%
Valid Votes	76,085	90.99%	1,149,125	84.83%	11,148,006	94.35%
Rejected Votes	7,532	9.01%	62,613	5.17%	667,240	5.65%
Total Polled	83,617	70.31%	1,211,738	68.64%	11,815,246	68.93%
Registered Electors	118,919		1,765,351		17,140,354	

=== 2020 Sri Lankan Parliamentary Election ===
Party	Colombo Central		Colombo Electoral District		Sri Lanka	
Party	Votes	%	Votes	%	Votes	%
SJB	64,692	73.39%	387,145	32.73%	2,771,984	23.9%
SLPFA	16,688	18.93%	674,603	57.04%	6,853,693	59.09%
UNP	2,978	3.38%	30,875	2.61%	249,435	2.15%
JJB	1,912	2.17%	67,600	5.72%	445,958	3.84%
Other Parties (with < 1%)	1,873	2.13%	22,553	1.9%	1,227,859	11.02%
Valid Votes	88,143	69.94%	1,182,776	93.59%	11,598,929	93.97%
Rejected Votes	8,955	7.11%	81,034	6.41%	744,373	6.03%
Total Polled	97,098	77.05%	1,263,810	73.94%	12,343,302	75.89%
Registered Electors	126,022		1,709,209		16,263,885	

=== 2015 Sri Lankan Parliamentary Election ===
Party	Colombo Central		Colombo Electoral District		Sri Lanka	
Party	Votes	%	Votes	%	Votes	%
UNP	79,968	84.73%	640,743	53.04%	5,098,916	45.77%
UPFA	11,489	12.17%	474,063	39.25%	4,732,664	42.48%
JVP	2,109	2.23%	81,391	6.74%	544,154	4.88%
Other Parties (with < 1%)	815	0.86%	11,752	0.97%	93,045	0.84%
Valid Votes	94,381	94.56%	1,207,949	96.46%	11,140,333	95.35%
Rejected Votes	5,332	5.34%	43,372	3.46%	516,926	4.42%
Total Polled	99,809	75.91%	1,252,271	78.93%	11,684,111	77.66%
Registered Electors	131,482		1,586,598		15,044,490	

=== 2010 Sri Lankan Parliamentary Election ===
Party	Colombo Central		Colombo Electoral District		Sri Lanka	
Party	Votes	%	Votes	%	Votes	%
UNP	51,421	63.80%	339,750	36.19%	2,357,057	29.37%
UPFA	21,794	27.04%	480,896	51.23%	4,846,388	60.38%
DNA	6,243	7.75%	110,683	11.79%	441,251	5.50%
Other Parties (with < 1%)	1,135	1.41%	7,292	0.78%	48,240	0.60%
Valid Votes	80,593	92.32%	938,723	94.85%	8,026,322	96.03%
Rejected Votes	6,606	7.57%	50,354	5.09%	581,465	6.96%
Total Polled	87,297	62.43%	989,729	64.17%	8,358,246	59.29%
Registered Electors	139,822		1,542,457		14,097,690	

=== 2004 Sri Lankan Parliamentary Election ===
Party	Colombo Central		Colombo Electoral District		Sri Lanka	
Party	Votes	%	Votes	%	Votes	%
UNP	71,599	71.51%	441,841	41.77%	3,486,792	37.73%
UPFA	17,681	17.66%	414,688	39.20%	4,223,126	45.70%
JHU	8,881	8.87%	190,618	18.02%	552,723	5.98%
Other Parties (with < 1%)	1,968	1.97%	10,713	1.01%	90,868	0.98%
Valid Votes	100,129	94.83%	1,057,860	96.47%	9,241,931	94.52%
Rejected Votes	5,451	5.16%	38,605	3.52%	534,452	5.47%
Total Polled	105,593	68.67%	1,096,571	74.71%	9,777,821	75.74%
Registered Electors	153,763		1,467,751		12,909,631	

=== 2001 Sri Lankan Parliamentary Election ===
Party	Colombo Central		Colombo Electoral District		Sri Lanka	
Party	Votes	%	Votes	%	Votes	%
UNP	80,318	75.08%	546,417	51.62%	4,086,026	45.62%
PA	19,149	17.90%	353,401	33.39%	3,330,815	37.19%
JVP	3,883	3.63%	117,404	11.09%	815,353	9.10%
Other Parties (with < 1%)	1,971	1.84%	28,563	2.70%	213,117	2.38%
TULF	1,649	1.54%	12,696	1.20%	348,164	3.89%
Valid Votes	106,970	94.94%	1,058,481	96.28%	8,955,844	94.77%
Rejected Votes	5,700	5.06%	40,901	3.72%	494,009	5.23%
Total Polled	112,670	70.68%	1,099,382	76.31%	9,449,878	76.03%
Registered Electors	159,417		1,440,682		12,428,762	

=== 2000 Sri Lankan Parliamentary Election ===
Party	Colombo Central		Colombo Electoral District		Sri Lanka	
Party	Votes	%	Votes	%	Votes	%
UNP	57,578	55.41%	440,684	43.45%	3,451,765	40.12%
PA	20,414	19.65%	394,146	38.86%	3,899,329	45.33%
NUA	16,420	15.80%	27,067	2.67%	185,593	2.16%
JVP	2,806	2.70%	78,133	7.70%	518,725	6.03%
Other Parties (with < 1%)	2,524	2.43%	17,052	1.68%	146,675	1.71%
SU	1,683	1.62%	49,671	4.90%	127,859	1.49%
CWC	1,247	1.20%	4,588	0.45%	22,985	0.27%
PP	1,236	1.19%	2,879	0.28%	19,830	0.23%
Valid Votes	103,908	N/A	1,014,220	N/A	8,602,617	N/A

=== 1994 Sri Lankan Parliamentary Election ===
Party	Colombo Central		Colombo Electoral District		Sri Lanka	
Party	Votes	%	Votes	%	Votes	%
UNP	50,136	52.38%	385,100	41.77%	3,498,370	44.04%
PA	42,060	43.95%	469,642	50.94%	3,887,805	48.94%
Other Parties (with < 1%)	1,988	2.08%	57,940	6.28%	162,412	2.04%
IND1	1,526	1.59%	9,251	1.00%	48,199	0.61%
Valid Votes	95,710	94.11%	921,933	96.18%	7,943,688	95.20%
Rejected Votes	5,995	5.89%	36,635	3.82%	400,395	4.80%
Total Polled	101,705	73.16%	958,568	76.04%	8,344,095	74.75%
Registered Electors	139,012		1,260,686		11,163,064	

=== 1989 Sri Lankan Parliamentary Election ===
Party	Colombo Central		Colombo Electoral District		Sri Lanka	
Party	Votes	%	Votes	%	Votes	%
UNP	49,733	56.90%	374,530	51.67%	2,838,005	50.71%
SLMC	19,874	22.74%	29,308	4.04%	202,016	3.61%
SLFP	11,861	13.57%	205,053	28.29%	1,785,369	31.90%
USA	4,399	5.03%	31,873	4.40%	141,983	2.54%
MEP	1,326	1.52%	76,966	10.62%	90,480	1.62%
Other Parties (with < 1%)	205	0.23%	7,112	0.98%	67,723	1.21%
Valid Votes	87,398	93.45%	724,842	95.36%	5,596,468	93.87%
Rejected Votes	6,126	6.55%	35,271	4.64%	365,563	6.13%
Total Polled	93,524	71.05%	760,113	69.87%	5,962,031	63.60%
Registered Electors	131,624		1,087,891		9,374,164	

== Demographics ==
=== Ethnicity ===
The Colombo Central Polling Division has a Moor majority (52.0%), a significant Sri Lankan Tamil population (24.2%) and a significant Sinhalese population (20.0%) . In comparison, the Colombo Electoral District (which contains the Colombo Central Polling Division) has a Sinhalese majority (76.5%), a significant Moor population (10.7%) and a significant Sri Lankan Tamil population (10.1%)

Ethnicity in Colombo Central
1. Moor (52.0%)
2. Sri Lankan Tamil (24.2%)
3. Sinhalese (20.0%)
4. Indian Tamil (1.60%)
5. Malay (1.60%)
6. Other (0.70%)

=== Religion ===
The Colombo Central Polling Division has a Muslim majority (54.0%), a significant Buddhist population (18.2%) and a significant Hindu population (17.6%) . In comparison, the Colombo Electoral District (which contains the Colombo Central Polling Division) has a Buddhist majority (70.2%) and a significant Muslim population (11.8%)

Religion in Colombo Central
1. Muslim (54.0%)
2. Buddhist (18.2%)
3. Hindu (17.6%)
4. Roman Catholic (8.20%)
5. Other Christian (1.90%)
6. Other (0.10%)
