= Colombo Divisional Secretariat =

- Divisional Secretariat
- Interactive map of Colombo Divisional Secretariat
- Country: Sri Lanka
- Province: Western Province
- District: Colombo District

Area
  - Total: 9.11 sq mi (23.60 km^{2})

Population (2024 census)
  - Total: 292,089
- Time zone: UTC+5:30 (Sri Lanka Standard Time)
- Website: www.colombo.ds.gov.lk

Colombo Divisional Secretariat is a Divisional Secretariat of Colombo District, of Western Province, Sri Lanka.

== Demography ==
Religion in Colombo DS Division (2024)
1. Buddhist (16.3%)
2. Hindu (24.6%)
3. Muslim (43.2%)
4. Roman Catholic (12.3%)
5. Other Christian (3.50%)
6. Other (0.10%)
