= Mahawatta (Colombo) Grama Niladhari Division =

Mahawatta
- Grama Niladhari Division
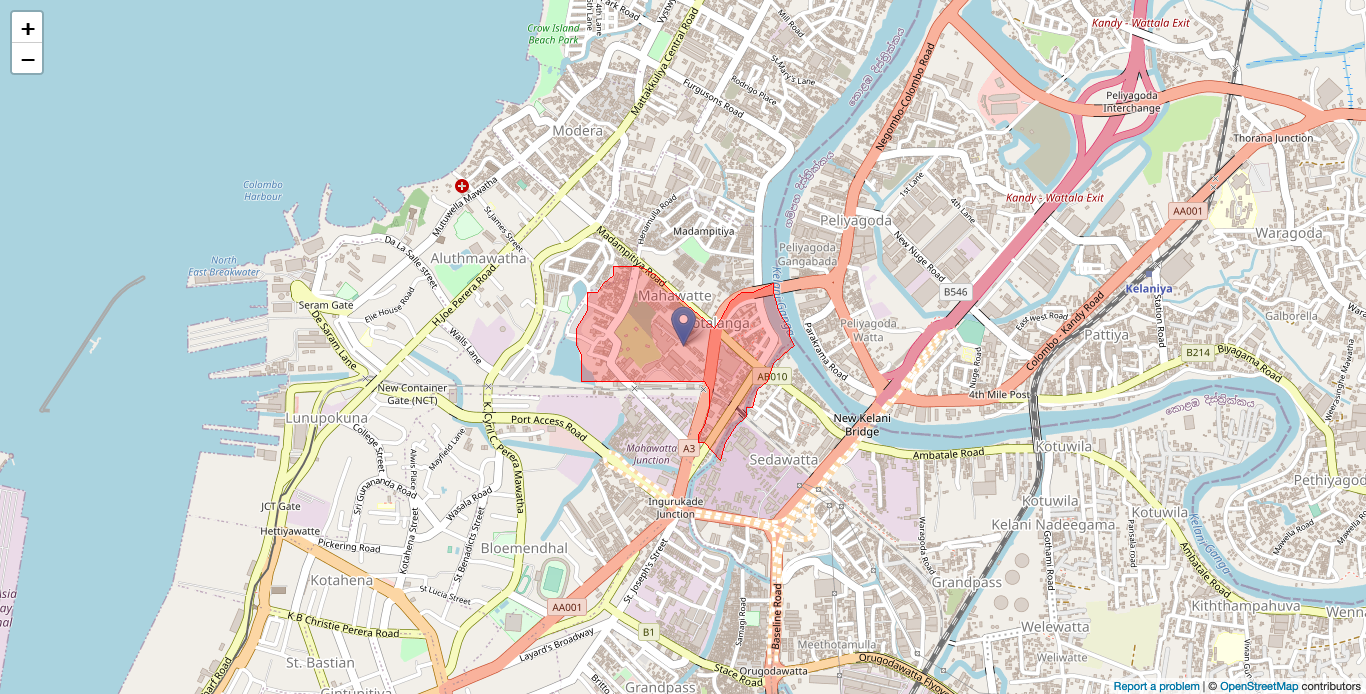
- Mahawatta Grama Niladhari Division
- Coordinates: 6.957938°N 79.874455°E
- Country: Sri Lanka
- Province: Western Province
- District: Colombo District
- Divisional Secretariat: Colombo Divisional Secretariat
- Electoral District: Colombo Electoral District
- Polling Division: Colombo North Polling Division

Area
  - Total: 0.54 km^{2} (0.21 sq mi)
- Elevation: 9 m (30 ft)

Population (2012)
  - Total: 8,809
  - Density: 16,313/km^{2} (42,250/sq mi)
- ISO 3166 code: LK-1103025

Mahawatta Grama Niladhari Division is a Grama Niladhari Division of the Colombo Divisional Secretariat of Colombo District of Western Province, Sri Lanka .

Modara, Madampitiya, Bloemendhal, Sojitz Kelanitissa Power Station, Kelanitissa Power Station and Rock House Army Camp are located within, nearby or associated with Mahawatta.

Mahawatta is a surrounded by the Peliyagoda Gangabada, Sedawatta, Wadulla, Bloemendhal, Aluthmawatha, Modara and Madampitiya Grama Niladhari Divisions.

== Demographics ==
=== Ethnicity ===
The Mahawatta Grama Niladhari Division has a Sinhalese plurality (45.9%), a significant Moor population (26.1%) and a significant Sri Lankan Tamil population (24.8%) . In comparison, the Colombo Divisional Secretariat (which contains the Mahawatta Grama Niladhari Division) has a Moor plurality (40.1%), a significant Sri Lankan Tamil population (31.1%) and a significant Sinhalese population (25.0%)

Ethnicity in Mahawatta
1. Sinhalese (45.9%)
2. Moor (26.1%)
3. Sri Lankan Tamil (24.8%)
4. Other (1.10%)
5. Indian Tamil (1.00%)
6. Malay (1.00%)

=== Religion ===
The Mahawatta Grama Niladhari Division has a Buddhist plurality (37.5%), a significant Muslim population (28.0%), a significant Hindu population (16.8%) and a significant Roman Catholic population (13.5%) . In comparison, the Colombo Divisional Secretariat (which contains the Mahawatta Grama Niladhari Division) has a Muslim plurality (41.8%), a significant Hindu population (22.7%), a significant Buddhist population (19.0%) and a significant Roman Catholic population (13.1%)

Religion in Mahawatta
1. Buddhist (37.5%)
2. Muslim (28.0%)
3. Hindu (16.8%)
4. Roman Catholic (13.5%)
5. Other Christian (4.00%)
6. Other (0.10%)

== Gallery ==
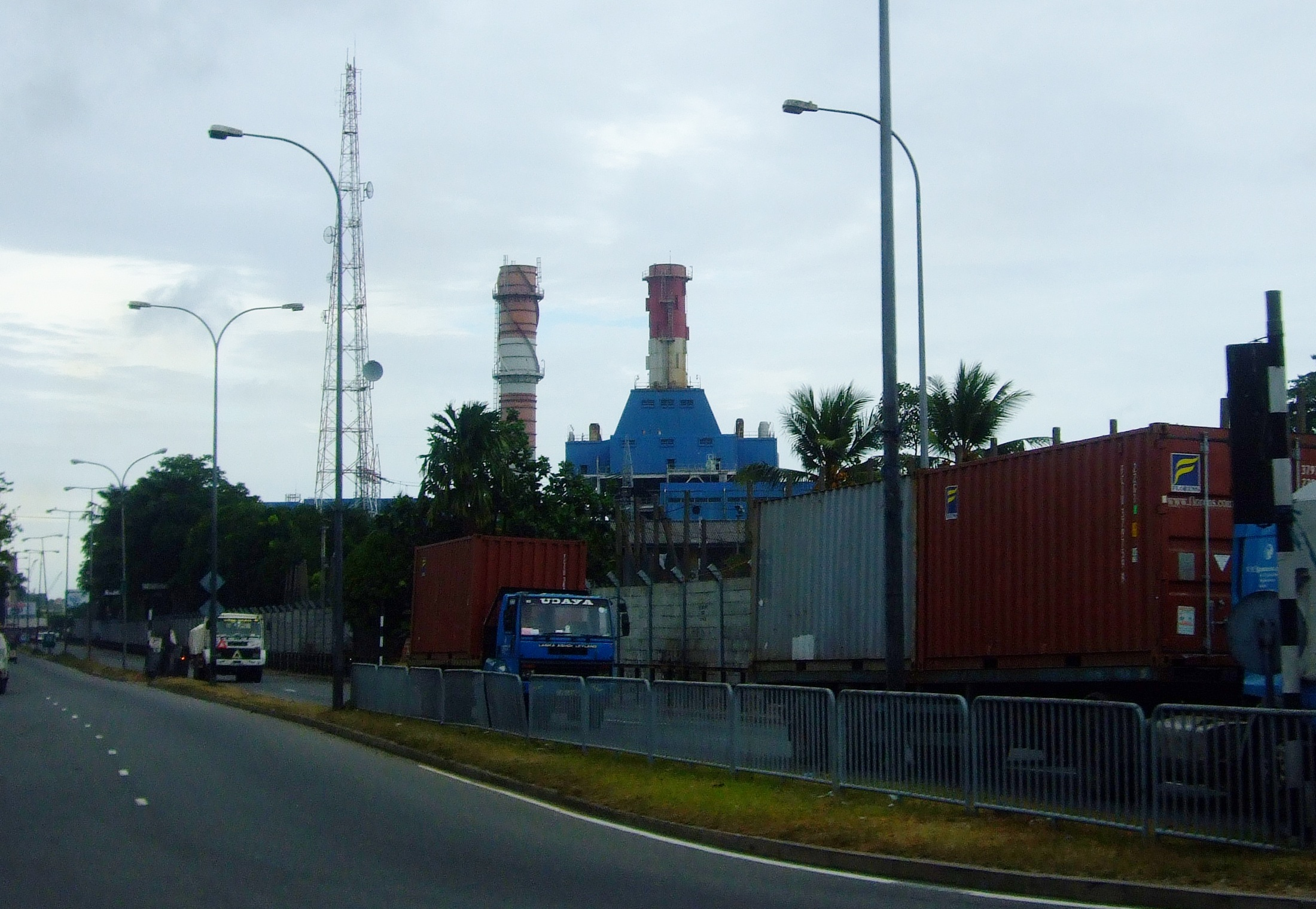
Sojitz Kelanitissa Power Station
