= Kotahena East Grama Niladhari Division =

Kotahena East
- Grama Niladhari Division
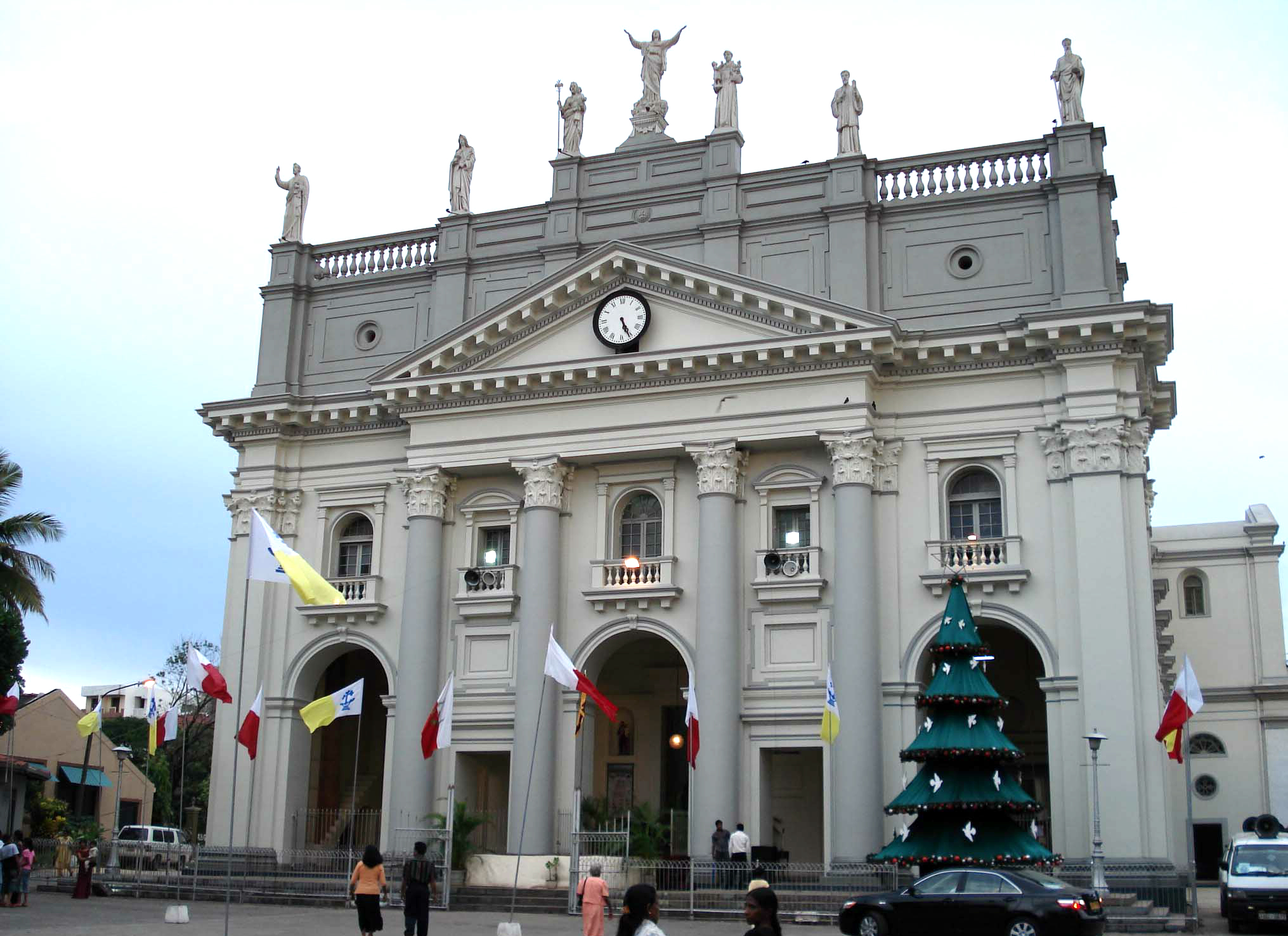
- St. Lucia's Cathedral is located within, nearby or associated with the Kotahena East Grama Niladhari Division
- Interactive map of Kotahena East
- Coordinates: 6.949000°N 79.864427°E
- Country: Sri Lanka
- Province: Western Province
- District: Colombo District
- Divisional Secretariat: Colombo Divisional Secretariat
- Electoral District: Colombo Electoral District
- Polling Division: Colombo North Polling Division

Area
  - Total: 0.38 km^{2} (0.15 sq mi)
- Elevation: 31 m (102 ft)

Population (2012)
  - Total: 6,385
  - Density: 16,803/km^{2} (43,520/sq mi)
- ISO 3166 code: LK-1103045

Kotahena East

Kotahena East Grama Niladhari Division is a Grama Niladhari Division of the Colombo Divisional Secretariat of Colombo District of Western Province, Sri Lanka.

St. Benedict's College, Colombo, St. Lucia's College, Colombo, Roman Catholic Archdiocese of Colombo, St. Lucia's Cathedral, Sugathadasa Stadium, Colombo Port Power Station, Bloemendhal, Kotahena, St. Thomas' Church, Colombo and St. Anthony's Shrine, Kochchikade are located within, nearby or associated with Kotahena East.

Kotahena East is a surrounded by the New Bazaar, Masangasweediya, Bloemendhal, Kotahena West and Lunupokuna Grama Niladhari Divisions.

== Demographics ==
=== Ethnicity ===
The Kotahena East Grama Niladhari Division has a Sri Lankan Tamil majority (76.1%) and a significant Sinhalese population (16.0%). In comparison, the Colombo Divisional Secretariat (which contains the Kotahena East Grama Niladhari Division) has a Moor plurality (40.1%), a significant Sri Lankan Tamil population (31.1%) and a significant Sinhalese population (25.0%)

Ethnicity in Kotahena East
1. Sri Lankan Tamil (76.1%)
2. Sinhalese (16.0%)
3. Moor (3.10%)
4. Indian Tamil (2.60%)
5. Other (2.30%)

=== Religion ===
The Kotahena East Grama Niladhari Division has a Hindu majority (52.7%), a significant Roman Catholic population (29.5%) and a significant Buddhist population (10.8%). In comparison, the Colombo Divisional Secretariat (which contains the Kotahena East Grama Niladhari Division) has a Muslim plurality (41.8%), a significant Hindu population (22.7%), a significant Buddhist population (19.0%) and a significant Roman Catholic population (13.1%)

Religion in Kotahena East
1. Hindu (52.7%)
2. Roman Catholic (29.5%)
3. Buddhist (10.8%)
4. Muslim (4.00%)
5. Other Christian (3.00%)
6. Other (0.00%)

== Gallery ==
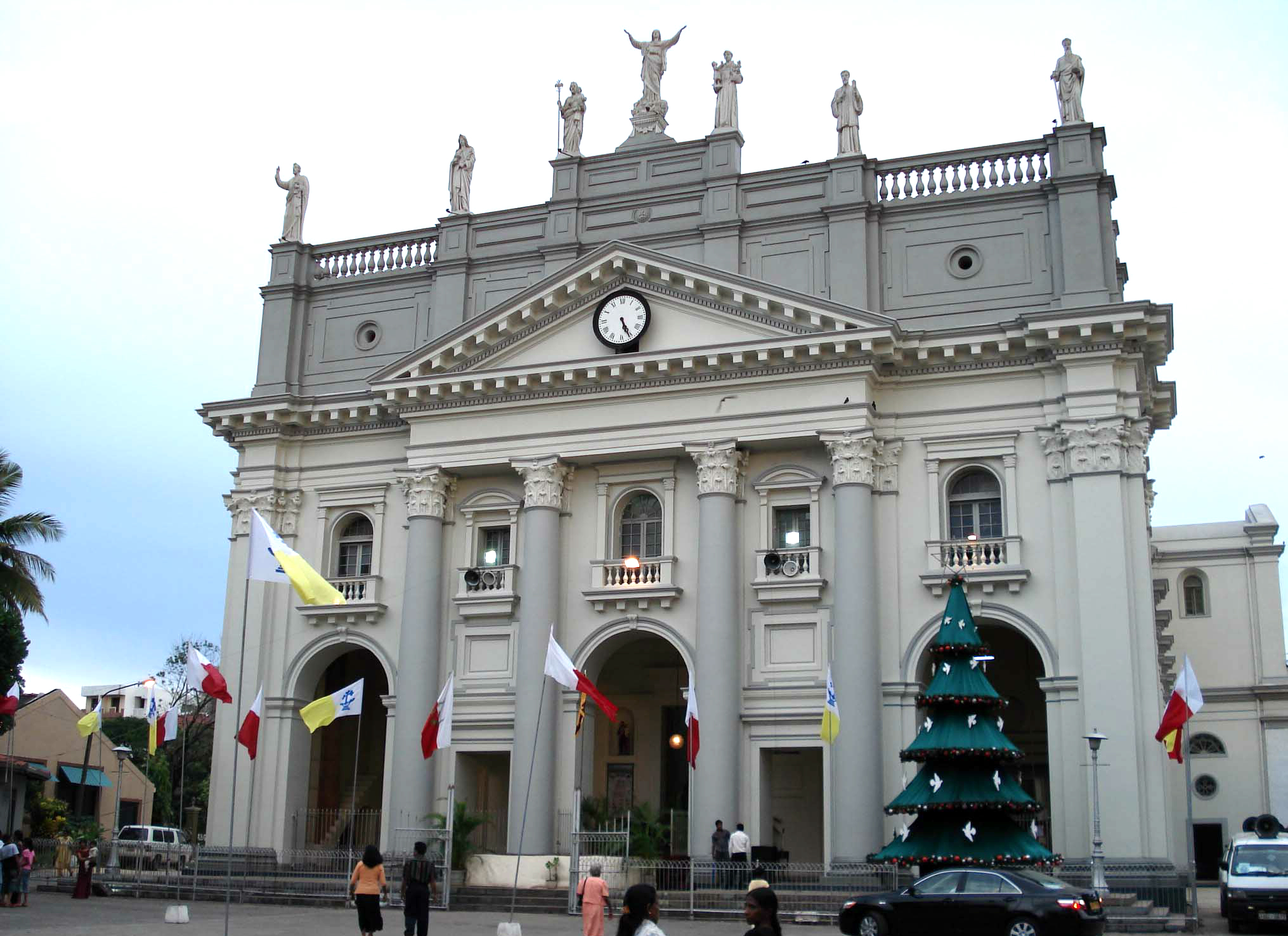
St. Lucia's Cathedral, Roman Catholic Archdiocese of Colombo

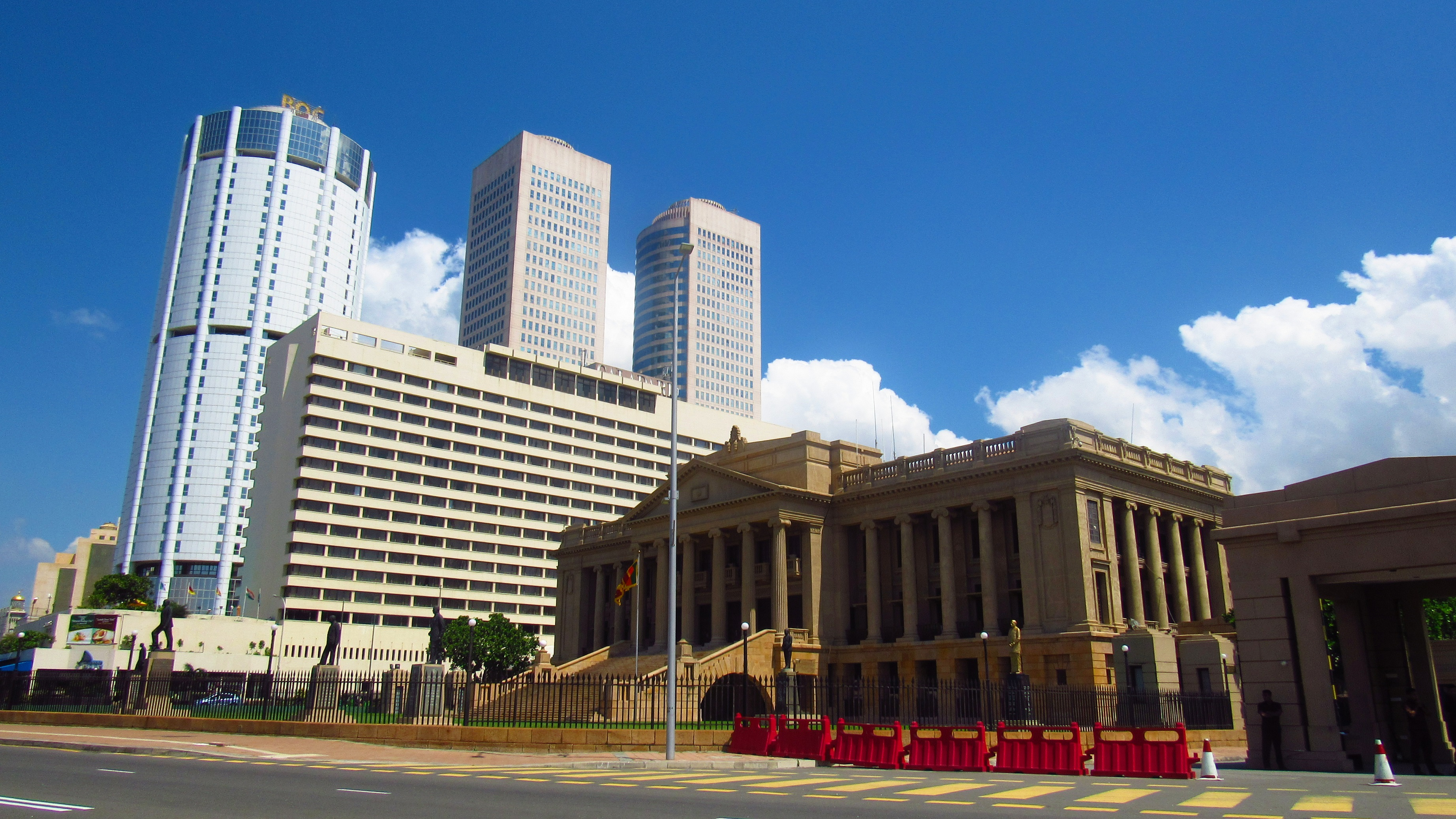
Sugathadasa Stadium

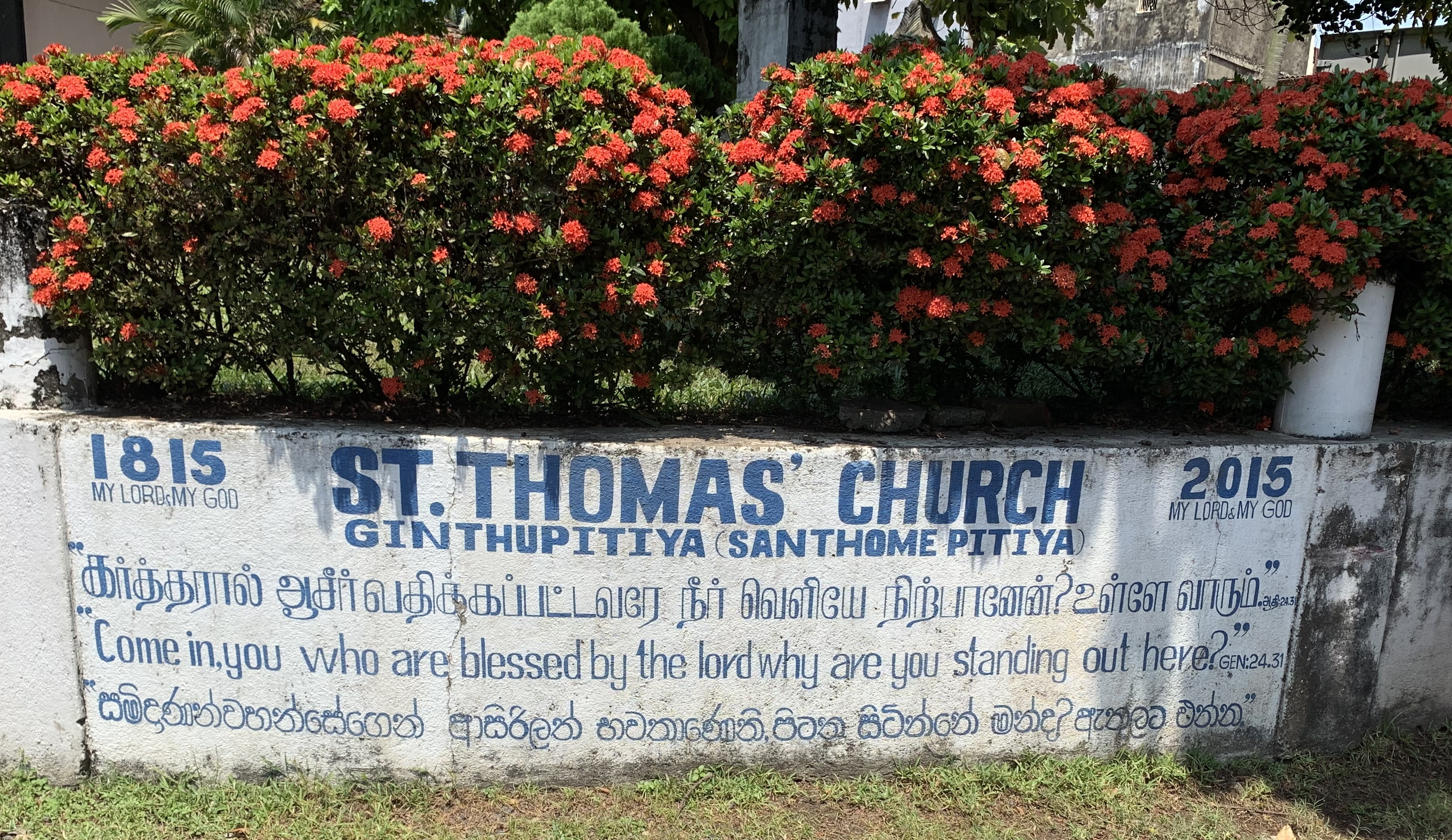
St. Thomas' Church, Colombo

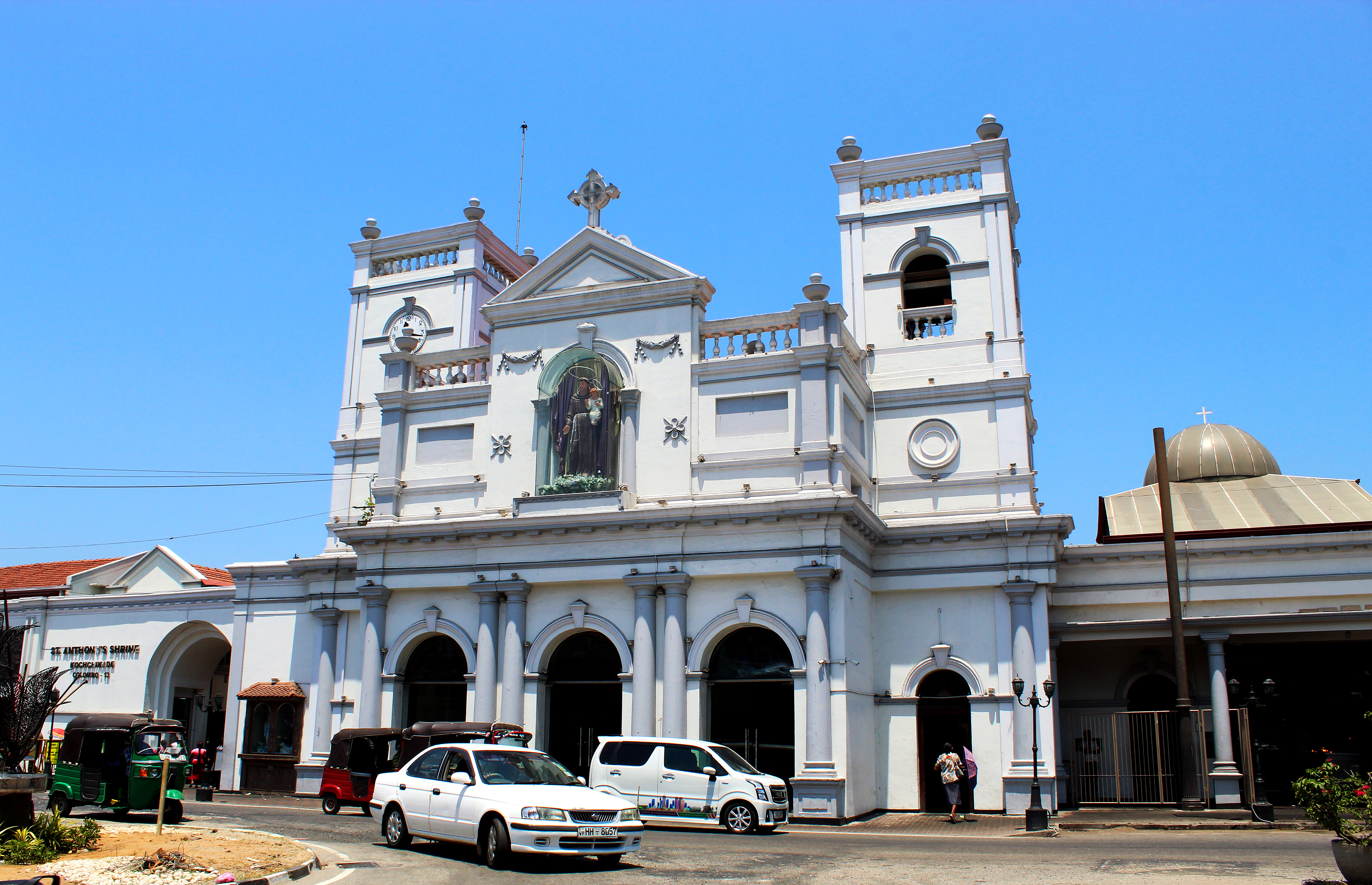
St. Anthony's Shrine, Kochchikade
