= Bloemendhal Grama Niladhari Division =

Bloemendhal
- Grama Niladhari Division
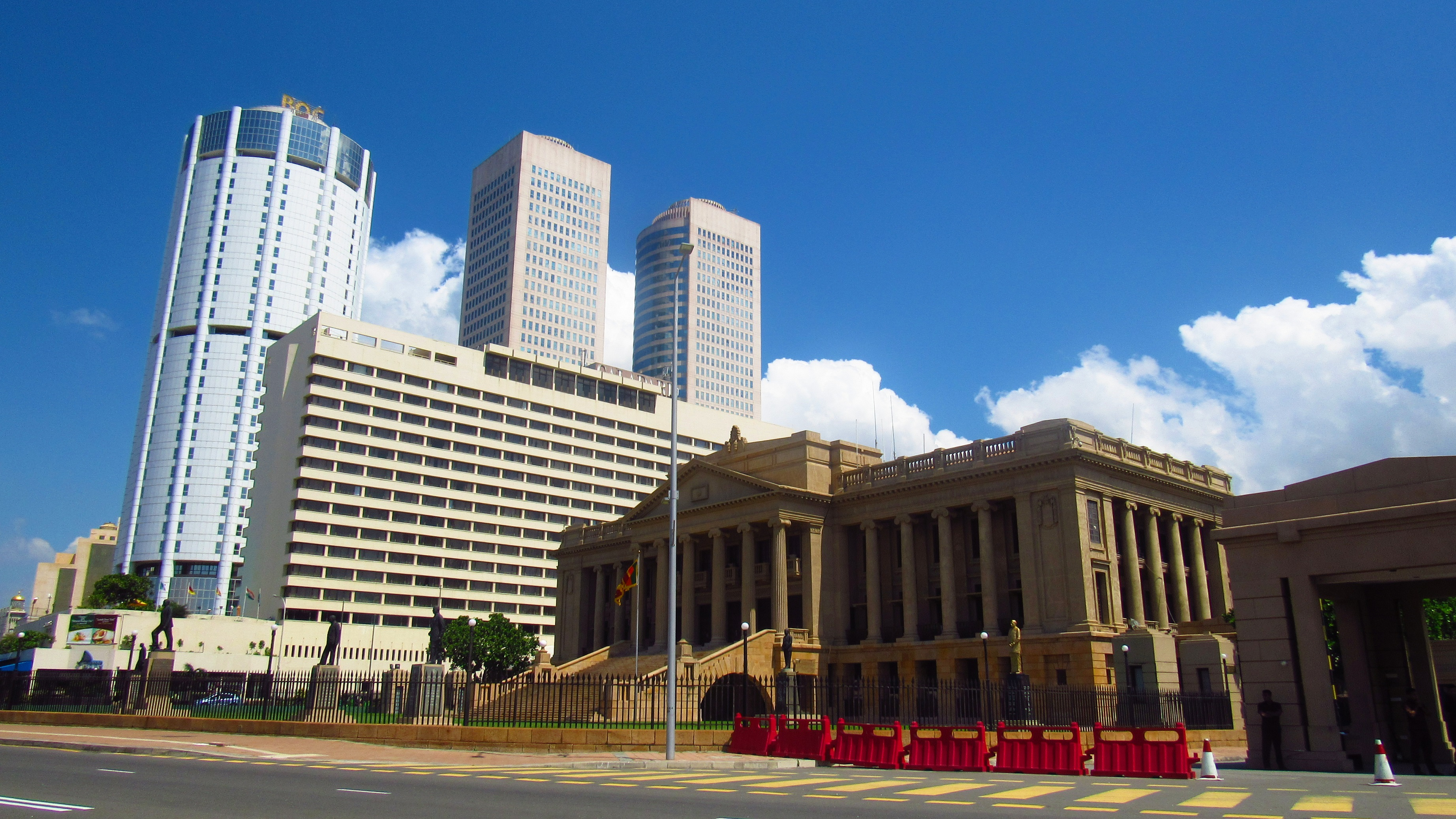
- Coordinates: 6.951537°N 79.868143°E
- Country: Sri Lanka
- Province: Western Province
- District: Colombo District
- Divisional Secretariat: Colombo Divisional Secretariat
- Electoral District: Colombo Electoral District
- Polling Division: Colombo North Polling Division

Area
  - Total: 1.11 km^{2} (0.43 sq mi)
- Elevation: 37 m (121 ft)

Population (2012)
  - Total: 13,802
  - Density: 12,434/km^{2} (32,200/sq mi)
- ISO 3166 code: LK-1103040

Bloemendhal

Bloemendhal Grama Niladhari Division is a Grama Niladhari Division of the Colombo Divisional Secretariat of Colombo District of Western Province, Sri Lanka.

Sugathadasa Stadium, Bloemendhal, St. Benedict's College, Colombo, St. Lucia's College, Colombo, St. Lucia's Cathedral, Roman Catholic Archdiocese of Colombo, Sojitz Kelanitissa Power Station, Grandpass and Colombo Port Power Station are located within, nearby or associated with Bloemendhal.

Bloemendhal is a surrounded by the Mahawatta, Wadulla, New Bazaar, Grandpass South, Aluthmawatha, Grandpass North, Kotahena East and Lunupokuna Grama Niladhari Divisions.

== Demographics ==
=== Ethnicity ===
The Bloemendhal Grama Niladhari Division has a Sri Lankan Tamil plurality (47.1%), a significant Sinhalese population (33.6%) and a significant Moor population (15.0%). In comparison, the Colombo Divisional Secretariat (which contains the Bloemendhal Grama Niladhari Division) has a Moor plurality (40.1%), a significant Sri Lankan Tamil population (31.1%) and a significant Sinhalese population (25.0%)

Ethnicity in Bloemendhal
1. Sri Lankan Tamil (47.1%)
2. Sinhalese (33.6%)
3. Moor (15.0%)
4. Other (1.60%)
5. Indian Tamil (1.50%)
6. Chetty (1.20%)

=== Religion ===
The Bloemendhal Grama Niladhari Division has a Hindu plurality (29.1%), a significant Buddhist population (26.0%), a significant Roman Catholic population (22.6%) and a significant Muslim population (16.0%). In comparison, the Colombo Divisional Secretariat (which contains the Bloemendhal Grama Niladhari Division) has a Muslim plurality (41.8%), a significant Hindu population (22.7%), a significant Buddhist population (19.0%) and a significant Roman Catholic population (13.1%)

Religion in Bloemendhal
1. Hindu (29.1%)
2. Buddhist (26.0%)
3. Roman Catholic (22.6%)
4. Muslim (16.0%)
5. Other Christian (6.30%)
6. Other (0.10%)

== Gallery ==
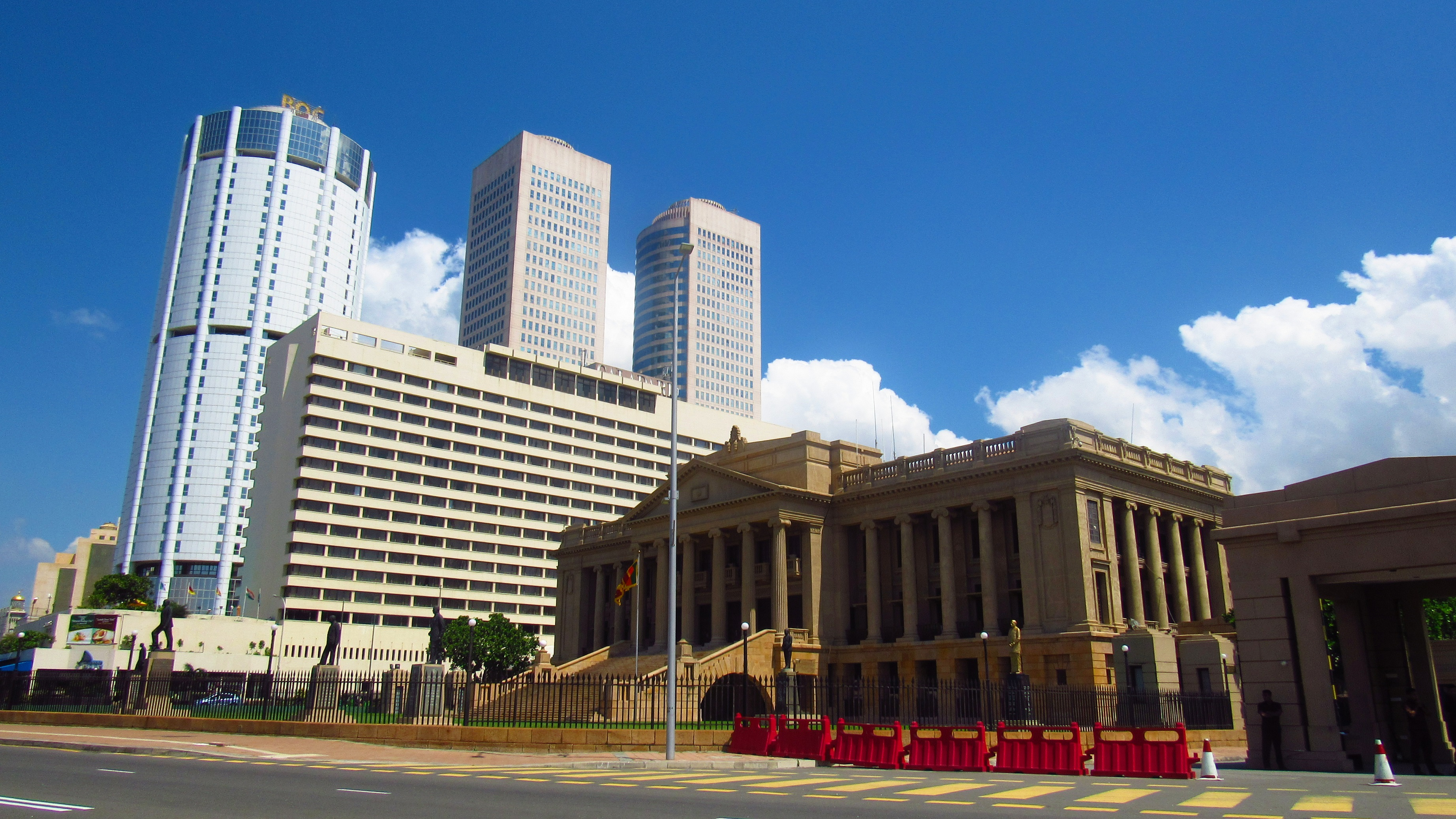
Sugathadasa Stadium

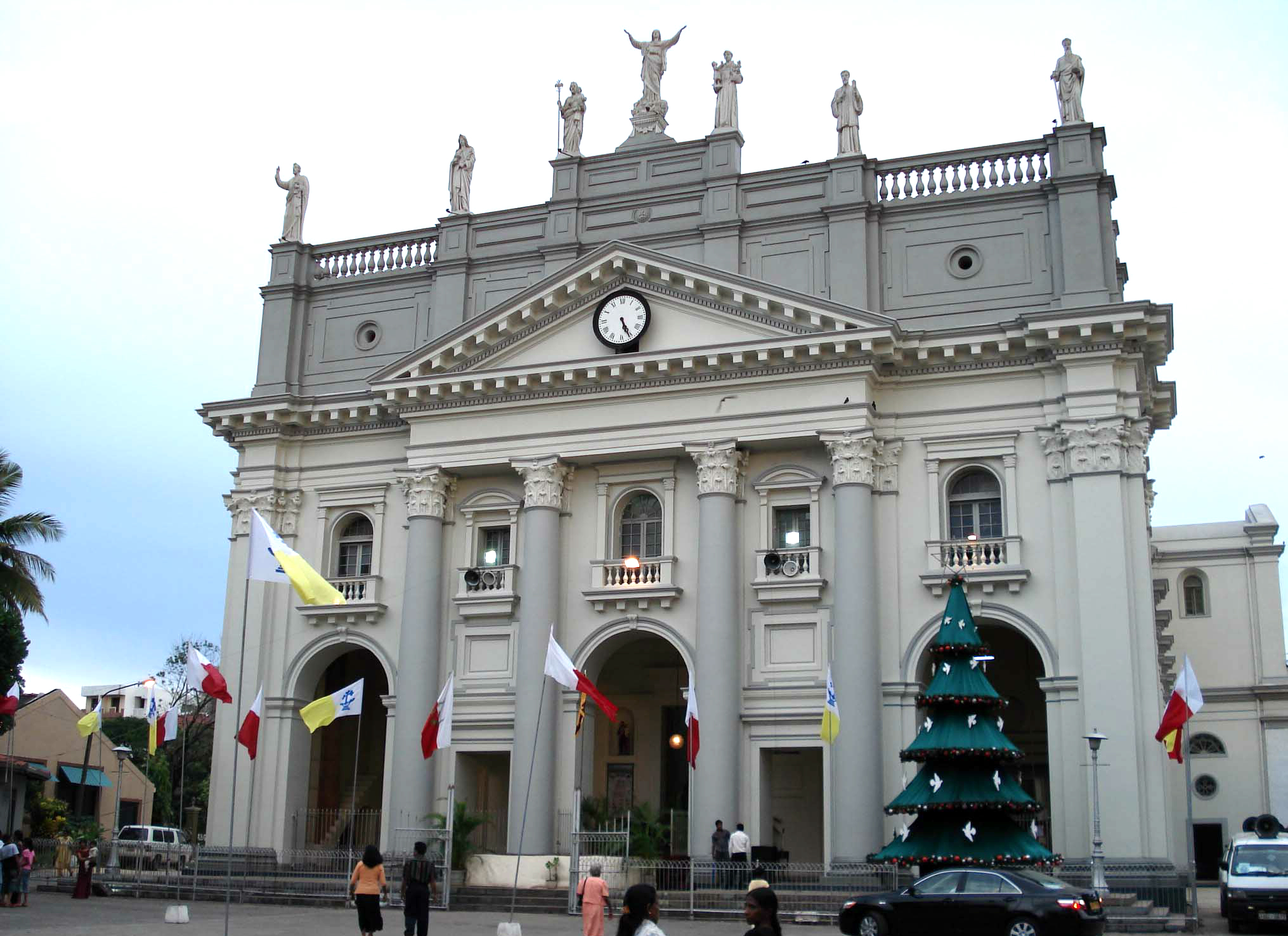
St. Lucia's Cathedral

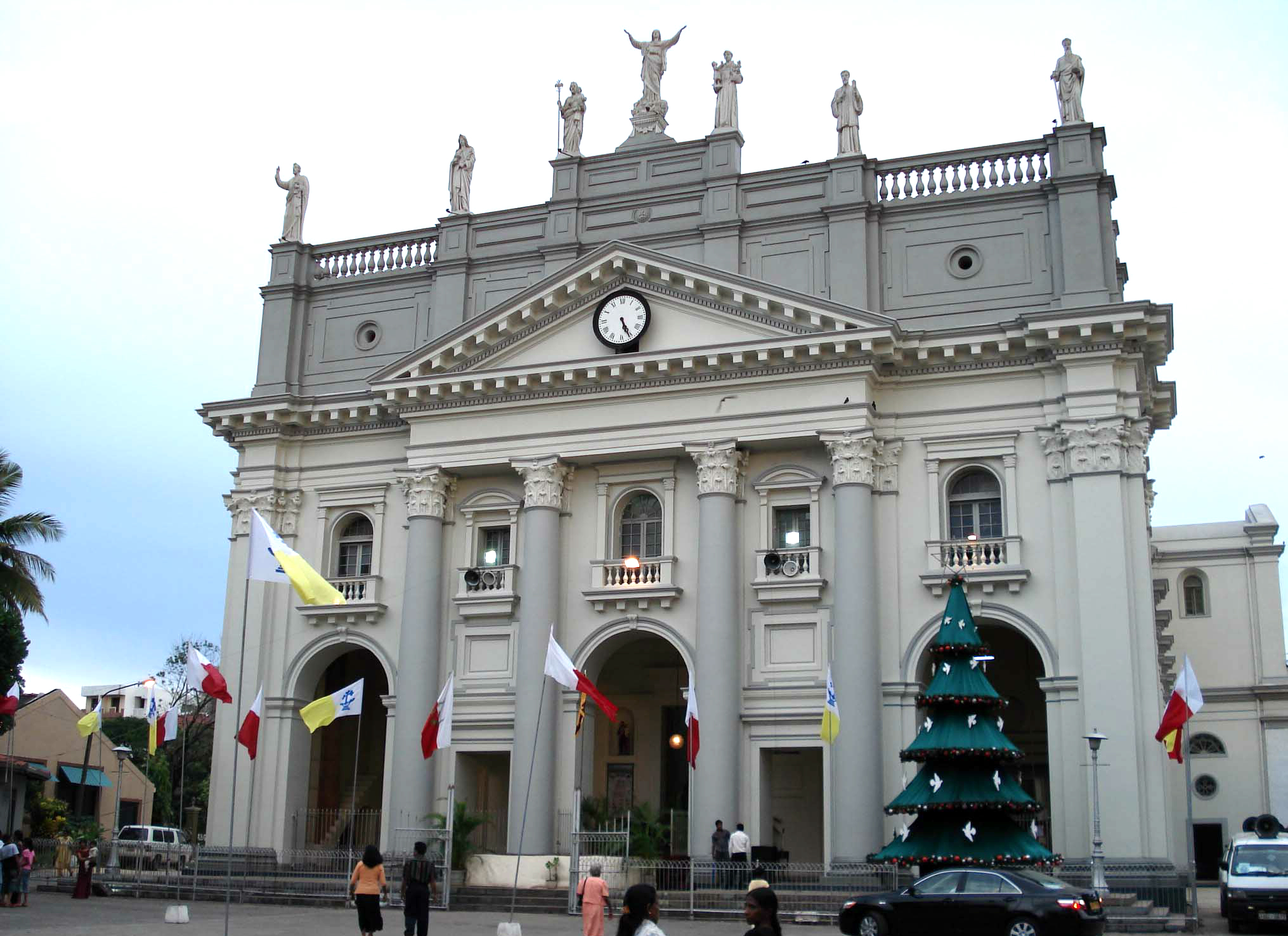
Roman Catholic Archdiocese of Colombo

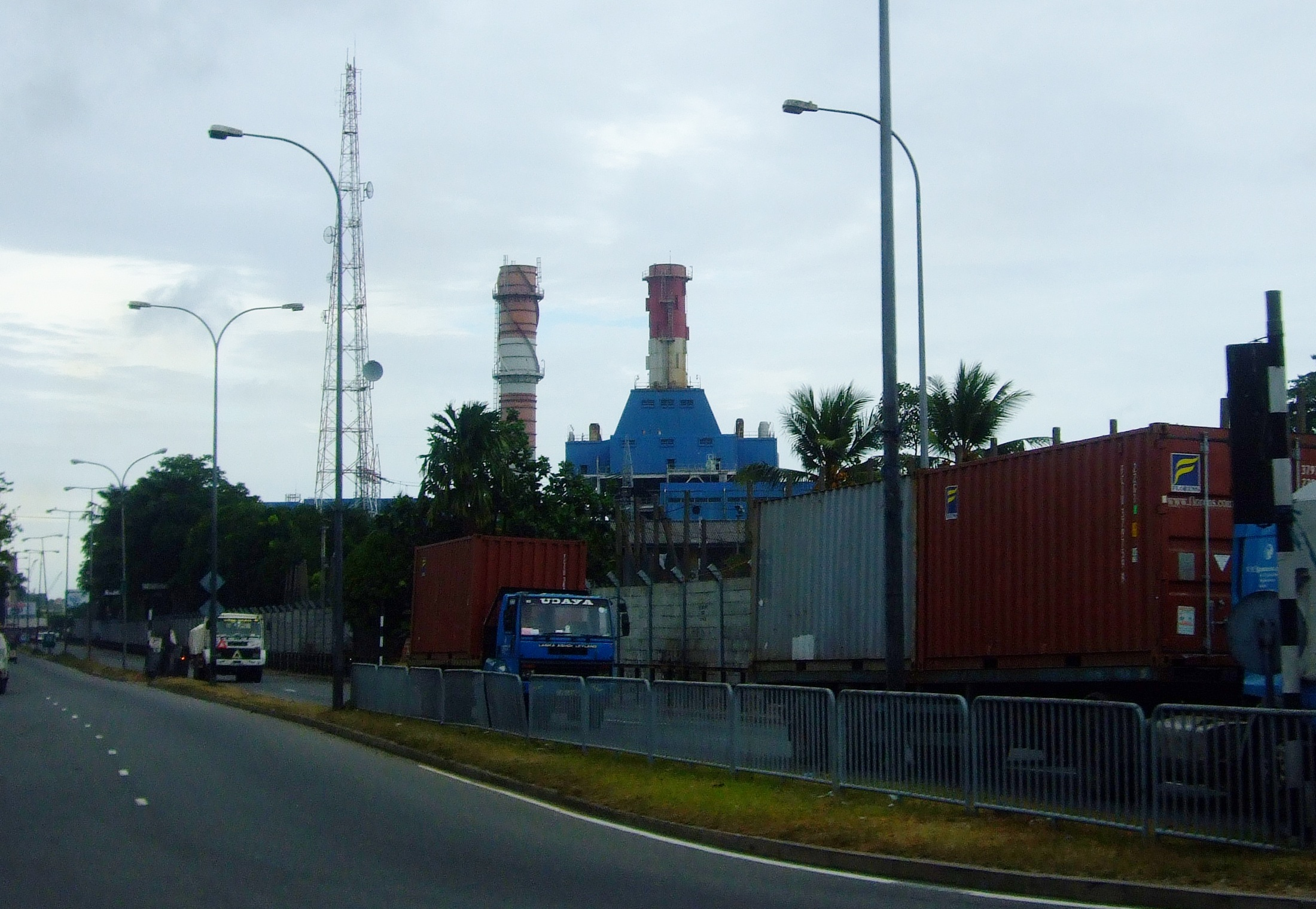
Sojitz Kelanitissa Power Station
