= Lunupokuna Grama Niladhari Division =

Lunupokuna
- Grama Niladhari Division
- Interactive map of Lunupokuna
- Coordinates: 6.957745°N 79.858287°E
- Country: Sri Lanka
- Province: Western Province
- District: Colombo District
- Divisional Secretariat: Colombo Divisional Secretariat
- Electoral District: Colombo Electoral District
- Polling Division: Colombo North Polling Division

Area
  - Total: 1.27 km^{2} (0.49 sq mi)
- Elevation: 26 m (85 ft)

Population (2012)
  - Total: 12,423
  - Density: 9,782/km^{2} (25,340/sq mi)
- ISO 3166 code: LK-1103035

Lunupokuna

Lunupokuna Grama Niladhari Division is a Grama Niladhari Division of the Colombo Divisional Secretariat of Colombo District of Western Province, Sri Lanka.

HMS Tenedos (H04), De La Salle College, Colombo and Colombo Port Power Station are located within, nearby or associated with Lunupokuna.

Lunupokuna is a surrounded by the Bloemendhal, Aluthmawatha, Kotahena East, Kotahena West and Pettah Grama Niladhari Divisions.

== Demographics ==
=== Ethnicity ===
The Lunupokuna Grama Niladhari Division has a Sri Lankan Tamil majority (51.1%) and a significant Sinhalese population (43.1%). In comparison, the Colombo Divisional Secretariat (which contains the Lunupokuna Grama Niladhari Division) has a Moor plurality (40.1%), a significant Sri Lankan Tamil population (31.1%) and a significant Sinhalese population (25.0%)

Ethnicity in Lunupokuna
1. Sri Lankan Tamil (51.1%)
2. Sinhalese (43.1%)
3. Moor (3.30%)
4. Indian Tamil (1.90%)
5. Other (0.60%)

=== Religion ===
The Lunupokuna Grama Niladhari Division has a Hindu plurality (37.7%), a significant Roman Catholic population (30.0%) and a significant Buddhist population (23.8%). In comparison, the Colombo Divisional Secretariat (which contains the Lunupokuna Grama Niladhari Division) has a Muslim plurality (41.8%), a significant Hindu population (22.7%), a significant Buddhist population (19.0%) and a significant Roman Catholic population (13.1%)

Religion in Lunupokuna
1. Hindu (37.7%)
2. Roman Catholic (30.0%)
3. Buddhist (23.8%)
4. Other Christian (4.80%)
5. Muslim (3.60%)
6. Other (0.10%)

== Gallery ==
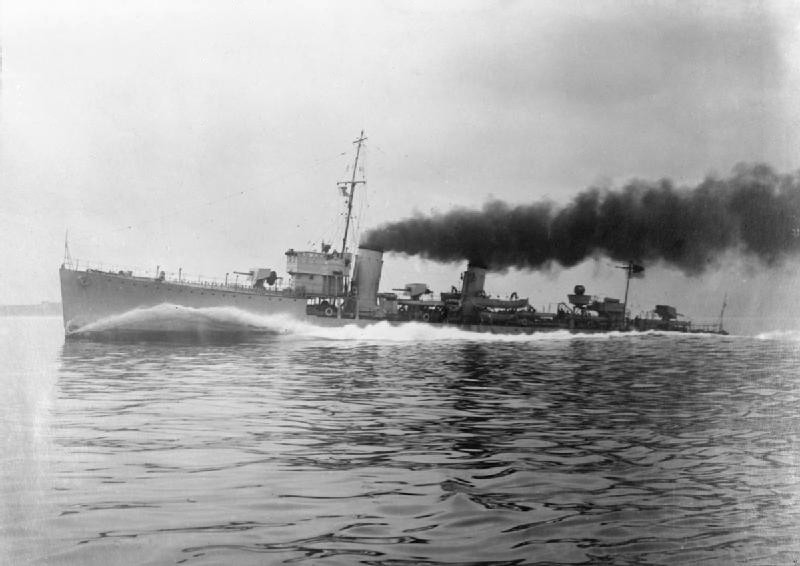
HMS Tenedos (H04)
