= Areas of Colombo =

Administrative subunits of Colombo

Colombo city is divided into administrative sub-units derived from feudal counties. The 15 divisions are listed below.

| Colombo | English name | Native Name |
|---|---|---|
| 1 | Colombo Fort | Kotuwa (Colombo) |
| 2 | Slave Island | Kompanyaweediya (Official Name) |
| 3 | Colpetty (Historical Name) | Kollupitiya |
| 4 | Bambalapitiya | |
| 5 | Narahenpita, Kirulapona North | |
| 5 | Havelock Town | Thimbirigasyaya |
| 6 | Wellawatta, Pamankada, Kirulapona South | |
| 7 | Cinnamon Garden | Kurunduwatte |
| 8 | Borella | |
| 9 | Dematagoda | |
| 10 | Maradana | |
| 11 | Pettah | Pitakotuwa |
| 12 | Hulftsdorp | Aluthkade |
| 13 | Bloemendhal, Kotahena, Kochchikade | |
| 14 | Grandpass | Thotalanga |
| 15 | Mattakkuliya, Modara/Mutwal, Madampitiya | |
