= Madampitiya Grama Niladhari Division =

Madampitiya
- Grama Niladhari Division
- Interactive map of Madampitiya
- Coordinates: 6.962215°N 79.875542°E
- Country: Sri Lanka
- Province: Western Province
- District: Colombo District
- Divisional Secretariat: Colombo Divisional Secretariat
- Electoral District: Colombo Electoral District
- Polling Division: Colombo North Polling Division

Area
  - Total: 0.31 km^{2} (0.12 sq mi)
- Elevation: 46 m (151 ft)

Population (2012)
  - Total: 12,970
  - Density: 41,839/km^{2} (108,360/sq mi)
- ISO 3166 code: LK-1103020

Madampitiya

Madampitiya Grama Niladhari Division is a Grama Niladhari Division of the Colombo Divisional Secretariat of Colombo District of Western Province, Sri Lanka.

Modara, Madampitiya and Rock House Army Camp are located within, nearby or associated with Madampitiya.

Madampitiya is a surrounded by the Mahawatta, Peliyagoda Gangabada, Modara and Mattakkuliya Grama Niladhari Divisions.

== Demographics ==
=== Ethnicity ===
The Madampitiya Grama Niladhari Division has a Moor plurality (39.6%), a significant Sri Lankan Tamil population (29.9%) and a significant Sinhalese population (28.9%). In comparison, the Colombo Divisional Secretariat (which contains the Madampitiya Grama Niladhari Division) has a Moor plurality (40.1%), a significant Sri Lankan Tamil population (31.1%) and a significant Sinhalese population (25.0%)

Ethnicity in Madampitiya
1. Moor (39.6%)
2. Sri Lankan Tamil (29.9%)
3. Sinhalese (28.9%)
4. Indian Tamil (1.00%)
5. Other (0.60%)

=== Religion ===
The Madampitiya Grama Niladhari Division has a Muslim plurality (41.1%), a significant Buddhist population (23.5%), a significant Hindu population (20.8%) and a significant Roman Catholic population (11.3%). In comparison, the Colombo Divisional Secretariat (which contains the Madampitiya Grama Niladhari Division) has a Muslim plurality (41.8%), a significant Hindu population (22.7%), a significant Buddhist population (19.0%) and a significant Roman Catholic population (13.1%)

Religion in Madampitiya
1. Muslim (41.1%)
2. Buddhist (23.5%)
3. Hindu (20.8%)
4. Roman Catholic (11.3%)
5. Other Christian (3.30%)
6. Other (0.00%)
