= Dematagoda Grama Niladhari Division =

Dematagoda
- Grama Niladhari Division
- Interactive map of Dematagoda
- Coordinates: 6.935420°N 79.881398°E
- Country: Sri Lanka
- Province: Western Province
- District: Colombo District
- Divisional Secretariat: Thimbirigasyaya Divisional Secretariat
- Electoral District: Colombo Electoral District
- Polling Division: Borella Polling Division

Area
  - Total: 0.83 km^{2} (0.32 sq mi)
- Elevation: 6 m (20 ft)

Population (2012)
  - Total: 18,602
  - Density: 22,412/km^{2} (58,050/sq mi)
- ISO 3166 code: LK-1127030

Dematagoda

Dematagoda Grama Niladhari Division is a Grama Niladhari Division of the Thimbirigasyaya Divisional Secretariat of Colombo District of Western Province, Sri Lanka.

Dematagoda and Veluwana College are located within, nearby or associated with Dematagoda.

Dematagoda is a surrounded by the Maligawatta East, Grandpass South, Gajabapura, Meethotamulla, Orugodawatta and Wanathamulla Grama Niladhari Divisions.

== Demographics ==
=== Ethnicity ===
The Dematagoda Grama Niladhari Division has a Sri Lankan Tamil plurality (34.3%), a significant Sinhalese population (30.8%) and a significant Moor population (30.1%). In comparison, the Thimbirigasyaya Divisional Secretariat (which contains the Dematagoda Grama Niladhari Division) has a Sinhalese majority (52.8%), a significant Sri Lankan Tamil population (28.0%) and a significant Moor population (15.1%)

Ethnicity in Dematagoda
1. Sri Lankan Tamil (34.3%)
2. Sinhalese (30.8%)
3. Moor (30.1%)
4. Malay (3.40%)
5. Other (1.40%)

=== Religion ===
The Dematagoda Grama Niladhari Division has a Muslim plurality (37.4%), a significant Buddhist population (29.1%) and a significant Hindu population (22.4%). In comparison, the Thimbirigasyaya Divisional Secretariat (which contains the Dematagoda Grama Niladhari Division) has a Buddhist plurality (47.9%), a significant Hindu population (22.5%) and a significant Muslim population (17.4%)

Religion in Dematagoda
1. Muslim (37.4%)
2. Buddhist (29.1%)
3. Hindu (22.4%)
4. Roman Catholic (8.30%)
5. Other Christian (2.80%)
6. Other (0.00%)
