= Marine Drive Tunnel =

Road tunnel in Sri Lanka

- Interactive map of Marine Drive Tunnel

Overview
- Location: Kollupitiya
- Coordinates: 06°55′05″N 79°50′47″E
- Status: Proposed
- Start: Marine Drive, Kollupitiya
- End: CIFC, near Sambodhi Chaithya

Operation
- Owner: RDA

The Marine Drive Tunnel is a road tunnel, currently under construction, which will connect Marine Drive in Kollupitiya to the Colombo International Financial City (CIFC). The Cabinet of Sri Lanka has approved the signing of the MOU in January 2018.

== Route ==
The tunnel would begin at the northern-end of Marine Drive, before connecting to the CIFC after passing under Galle Face Green. Preliminary assessments were completed to further extend the road connection to the Colombo Harbour and the New Kelani Bridge, where the existing E03 expressway begins, before terminating at the Bandaranaike International Airport. The extension may be built as a continuation of the tunnel or as an elevated highway. The construction of the tunnel will also further expand the Galle Face Green towards the ocean.

== See also ==
- Expressways of Sri Lanka
