= Grandpass South Grama Niladhari Division =

Grandpass South
- Grama Niladhari Division
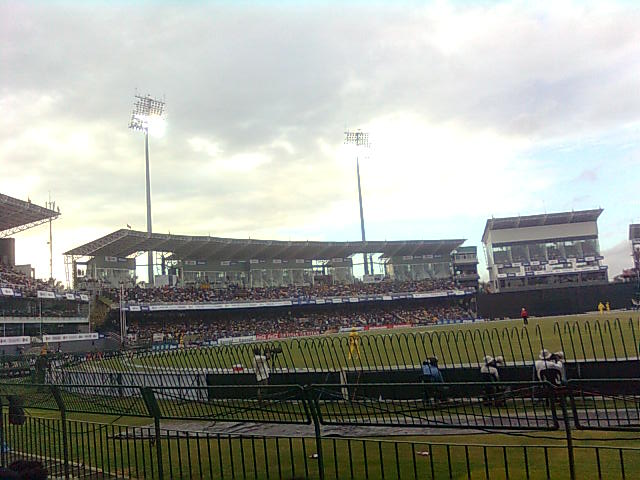
- R. Premadasa Stadium is located within, nearby or associated with the Grandpass South Grama Niladhari Division
- Interactive map of Grandpass South
- Coordinates: 6.942676°N 79.873225°E
- Country: Sri Lanka
- Province: Western Province
- District: Colombo District
- Divisional Secretariat: Colombo Divisional Secretariat
- Electoral District: Colombo Electoral District
- Polling Division: Colombo Central Polling Division

Area
  - Total: 0.58 km^{2} (0.22 sq mi)
- Elevation: 31 m (102 ft)

Population (2012)
  - Total: 17,588
  - Density: 30,324/km^{2} (78,540/sq mi)
- ISO 3166 code: LK-1103075

Grandpass South

Grandpass South Grama Niladhari Division is a Grama Niladhari Division of the Colombo Divisional Secretariat of Colombo District of Western Province, Sri Lanka.

R. Premadasa Stadium, Grandpass, Maligawatta and Sugathadasa Stadium are located within, nearby or associated with Grandpass South.

Grandpass South is a surrounded by the New Bazaar, Maligawatta East, Nawagampura, Orugodawatta, Dematagoda, Khettarama, Bloemendhal and Grandpass North Grama Niladhari Divisions.

== Demographics ==
=== Ethnicity ===
The Grandpass South Grama Niladhari Division has a Moor plurality (45.1%), a significant Sinhalese population (34.8%) and a significant Sri Lankan Tamil population (17.6%). In comparison, the Colombo Divisional Secretariat (which contains the Grandpass South Grama Niladhari Division) has a Moor plurality (40.1%), a significant Sri Lankan Tamil population (31.1%) and a significant Sinhalese population (25.0%)

Ethnicity in Grandpass South
1. Moor (45.1%)
2. Sinhalese (34.8%)
3. Sri Lankan Tamil (17.6%)
4. Other (1.40%)
5. Indian Tamil (1.20%)

=== Religion ===
The Grandpass South Grama Niladhari Division has a Muslim plurality (45.1%), a significant Buddhist population (31.8%) and a significant Hindu population (14.7%). In comparison, the Colombo Divisional Secretariat (which contains the Grandpass South Grama Niladhari Division) has a Muslim plurality (41.8%), a significant Hindu population (22.7%), a significant Buddhist population (19.0%) and a significant Roman Catholic population (13.1%)

Religion in Grandpass South
1. Muslim (45.1%)
2. Buddhist (31.8%)
3. Hindu (14.7%)
4. Roman Catholic (6.40%)
5. Other Christian (1.70%)
6. Other (0.40%)

== Gallery ==
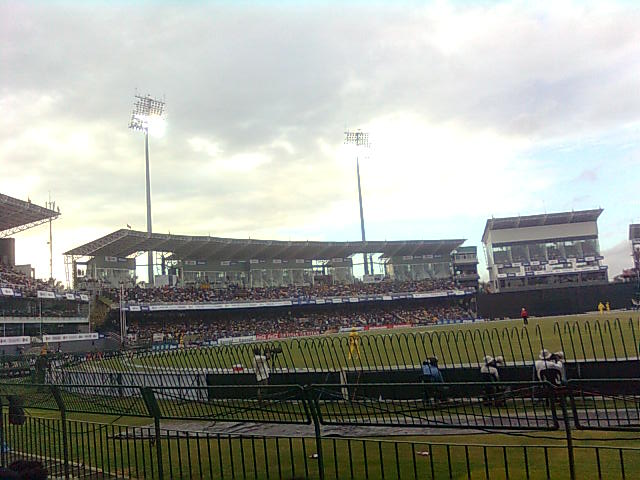
R. Premadasa Stadium

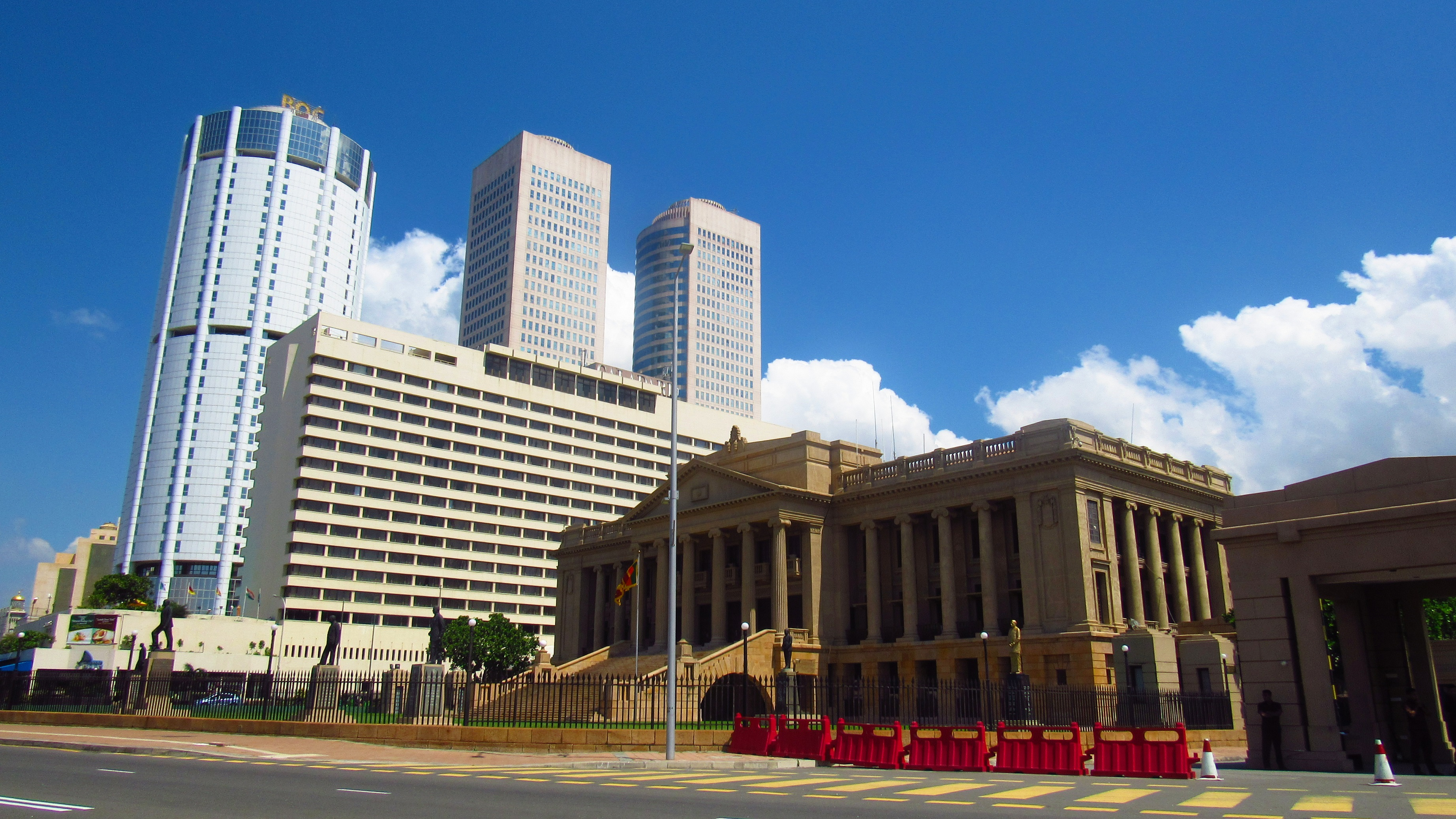
Sugathadasa Stadium
