= Kollupitiya =

Kollupitiya: කොල්ලුපිටිය; கொள்ளுபிட்டி
- Suburb
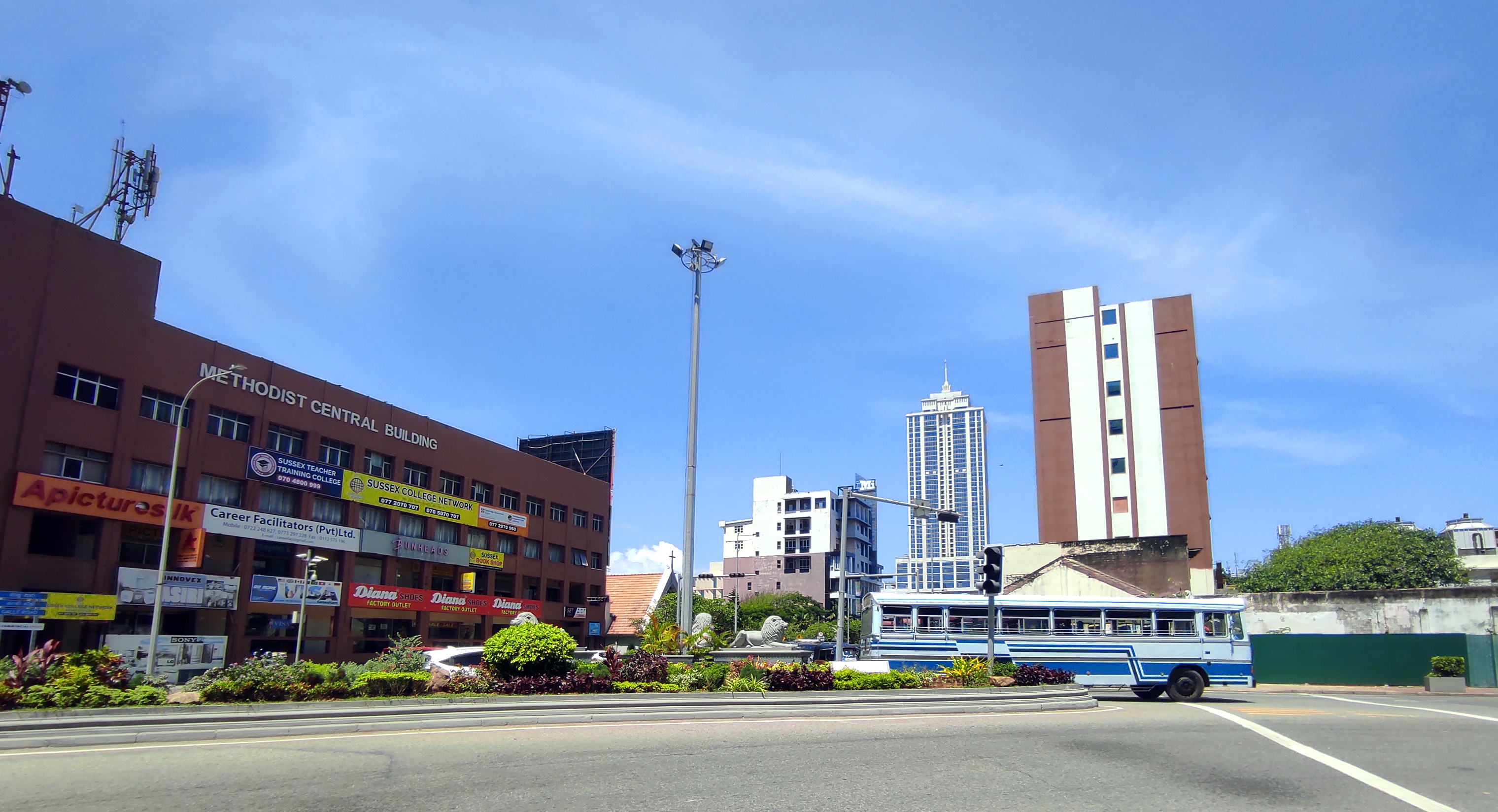
- Kollupitiya junction

- Location in Greater Colombo
- Coordinates: 6°54′2″N 79°51′12″E
- Country: Sri Lanka
- Province: Western Province
- District: Colombo District
- Time zone: UTC+5:30 (Sri Lanka Standard Time Zone)
- Postal Code: 00300

Kollupitiya (historically known as Colpetty, administratively as Colombo 3) is a major neighbourhood of Colombo, Sri Lanka. The name Kollupitiya comes from the name of a chief from Kandy who had unsuccessfully attempted to dethrone the last king of Kandy. During the periods of Dutch and British administration, a brewery for the conversion of coconut treacle into liquor had commenced and continued operation in Kollupitiya. The suburb is a thriving commercial area containing fashionable high-end shopping malls. Some foreign embassies are located in Kollupitiya, as is the official residence of the prime minister.

== Demographics ==
Kollupitiya is a multi-religious and multi-ethnic area. The major ethnic communities in Kollupitiya are Sri Lankan Moors, Sinhalese, and Sri Lankan Tamils. There are also various minorities, such as Burghers. Religions include Buddhism, Hinduism, Islam, and Christianity.

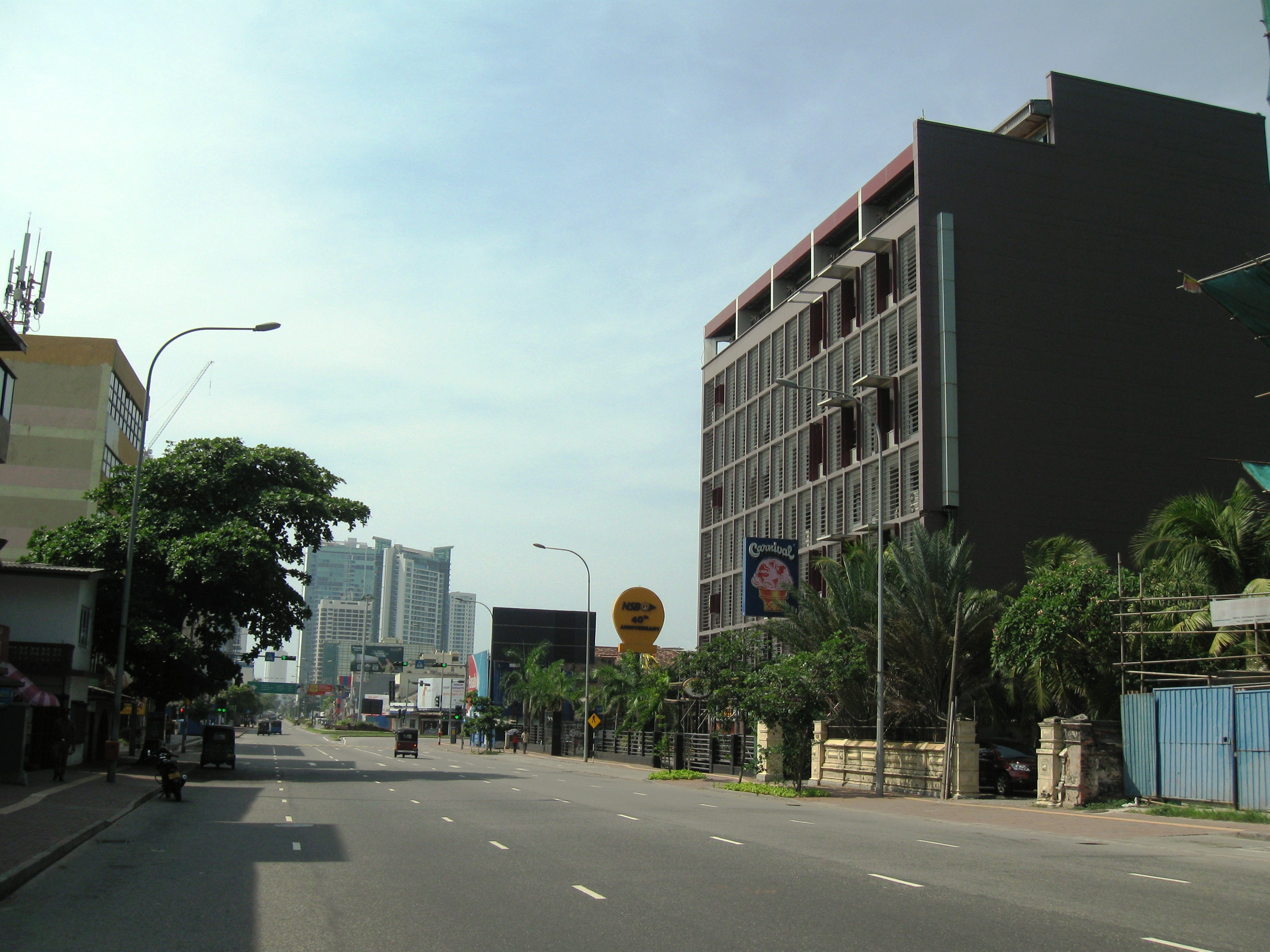
Galle Road, Kollupitiya

Muslim traders form a large part of the Kollupitiya economy with many businesses being operated by the local Sri Lankan Moors. In recent years, the influx of a new wave of Chinese migrants to Colombo has led to an increase of Chinese shops and businesses in the area. Many Chinese migrants have opened shops and other businesses that cater to the migrant Chinese community. Some Sri Lankan residents of Kollupitiya have also been influenced by the influx of Chinese people to the area by shopping at the Chinese-run businesses and even picking up aspects of Mandarin Chinese.

== Schools ==
Several government and private schools are located in Kollupitiya, including:

- Bishop's College
- Mahanama College
- Methodist College Colombo
- S. Thomas' Preparatory School

== Diplomatic missions ==
- Consulate General of Finland
- Embassy of Germany
- Consulate of Belgium
- High Commission of India
- High Commission of Malaysia
- Consulate of Malta
- Embassy of the United States of America
- Consulate of Bosnia and Herzegovina
- Consulate of Botswana
- Consulate of Chile
- Embassy of Oman

== Government Offices ==
- Temple Trees (official residence of the prime minister)
- National Savings Bank Head Office (Savings House)
- Sri Lanka Tourism headquarters
- Civil Aviation Authority of Sri Lanka
- Department of Economic Development

== See also ==
- Marine Drive Tunnel
