= Kelanitissa Power Station =

Diesel-fired power station in Colombo, Sri Lanka

- Country: Sri Lanka
- Location: Colombo
- Coordinates: 6°57′08″N 79°52′44″E
- Status: Operational
- Commission date: 1964
- Operator: CEB

Thermal power station
- Primary fuel: Diesel fuel
- Secondary fuel: Naphtha
- Turbine technology: Gas turbine; Steam turbine
- Combined cycle?: Yes

Power generation
- Units operational: 4 × 20 MW; 1 × 55 MW; 1 × 110 MW; 1 × 115 MW
- Make and model: GE Power (4); Unknown (3)
- Units decommissioned: 2 × 20 MW; 2 × 25 MW
- Nameplate capacity: 360 MW
- Annual net output: 939 GWh

The Kelanitissa Power Station is a state-owned power station located on the south bank of the Kelani River in the northern part of the city of Colombo, Sri Lanka. Commissioned in 1964, it is the first thermal power station built in Sri Lanka, after the country gained independence. The facility has a current gross installed capacity of 360 MW, a significant amount when compared to the total installed capacity of nearly 4,086 MW in the year 2017. The facility is owned and operated by the Ceylon Electricity Board.

The power station has a total of 10 generation units: two 25 MW boiler steam units, six 20 MW gas turbines, one 115 MW gas turbine, and one 165 MW combined cycle unit. As of 2018, both 25 MW units and two 20 MW units were decommissioned after the commissioning of the combined cycle unit. The old units are now used as peak-load units. The 115 MW was sent to Italy for renovations in 2011.

The newest 165 MW naphtha-fuelled combined cycle unit was commissioned in August 2002. It consists of a 110 MW gas turbine and a 55 MW steam turbine, and one exhaust heat recovery boiler. The project was funded by the Overseas Economic Cooperation Fund of Japan. Initially, the capacity was planned at 150 MW with two or three 37–67 MW units, but a single unit with higher capacity was subsequently chosen.

Units
Commissioned	Capacity (MW)	Unit	Model	Plant division	Status
1964	25	Boiler 1		Boiler	Decommissioned
1964	25	Boiler 2		Boiler	Decommissioned
1980 November	20	Gas turbine 1	GE Frame 5	Gas Turbine	Decommissioned
1981 March	20	Gas turbine 2	GE Frame 5	Gas Turbine	Decommissioned
1981 April	20	Gas turbine 3	GE Frame 5	Gas Turbine	Operational
1981 December	20	Gas turbine 4	GE Frame 5	Gas Turbine	Operational
1982 March	20	Gas turbine 5	GE Frame 5	Gas Turbine	Operational
1982 April	20	Gas turbine 6	GE Frame 5	Gas Turbine	Operational
1997 August	115	Gas turbine 7		GT7	Operational
2002 August	110	Gas turbine 8		Combined Cycle	Operational
2002 August	55	Steam turbine		Combined Cycle	Operational

Electricity generation by plant division (GWh)
Year	Boiler	Gas Turbine 1-6	Gas Turbine 7	Combined Cycle	Total
1969	97	-	-	-	97
1970	2	-	-	-	2
1971	18	-	-	-	18
1972	88	-	-	-	88
1973	261	-	-	-	261
1974	13	-	-	-	13
1975	1	-	-	-	1
1976	24	-	-	-	24
1977	2	-	-	-	2
1978	14	-	-	-	14
1979	58	-	-	-	58
1980	140	18	-	-	158
1981	98	183	-	-	281
1982	89	353	-	-	442
1983	147	735	-	-	882
1984	11	117	-	-	128
1985	0	9	-	-	9
1986	-	1	-	-	1
1987	-	314	-	-	314
1988	-	83	-	-	83
1989	-	1	-	-	1
1990	1	0	-	-	1
1991	103	40	-	-	143
1992	163	302	-	-	465
1993	88	12	-	-	100
1994	87	102	-	-	189
1995	51	127	-	-	178
1996	227	500	-	-	727
1997	196	431	168	-	795
1998	214	39	303	-	556
1999	128	204	355	-	687
2000	228	374	602	-	1,204
2001	200	400	281	70	951
2002	69	179	227	470	945
2003	-	38	293	855	1,186
2004	-	141	439	1,107	1,687
2005	-	22	277	1,007	1,306
2006	-	6	67	734	807
2007	-	48	220	1,096	1,364
2008	-	25	94	1,044	1,163
2009	-	98	137	920	1,155
2010	-	26	27	494	547
2011	-	77	244	256	577
2012	-	98	120	880	1,098
2013	-	1	17	611	629
2014	-	34	208	751	993
2015	-	1	24	660	685
Total	2,818	5,139	4,103	10,955	23,015

== Incidents ==
- On 28 October 2008 at 23:30, the LTTE launched two bombs in an aerial attack on the power station, causing a fire and damaging the 115 MW government-owned Fiat unit. It took six months to restore the unit while one person was reported to have died, possibly due to shock. The attack was carried out using a Czech-built Zlín Z 42 single-engine trainer aircraft.
- On 21 April 2012 at about 03:00, a fire erupted at the power station complex, damaging the main switchboard for the plant's power generation machinery. Power generation was ceased, but did not trigger any blackouts due to alternative sources being available at the time. Six employees of the power station who inhaled noxious fumes as a result of the fire were hospitalized.
- On 3 February 2022 at about 20:00, the combined power station was shut down due to lack of fuel

== See also ==
- Sojitz Kelanitissa Power Station
- Electricity in Sri Lanka
- List of power stations in Sri Lanka
