= Borella Polling Division =

Borella
- Polling Division
- Coordinates: 6.922636°N 79.875391°E
- Country: Sri Lanka
- Province: Western Province, Sri Lanka
- Electoral District: Colombo Electoral District

Area
  - Total: 8.19 km^{2} (3.16 sq mi)

Population (2012)
  - Total: 89,806
  - Density: 10,965/km^{2} (28,400/sq mi)
- ISO 3166 code: EC-01C

The Borella Polling Division is a Polling Division in the Colombo Electoral District, in the Western Province, Sri Lanka.

== Presidential Election Results ==
=== Summary ===
The winner of Borella has matched the final country result 5 out of 9 times.

Year	Borella	Colombo Electoral District	MAE %	Sri Lanka	MAE %
2024	NPP	NPP	9.20%	NPP	4.30%
2019	NDF	SLPP	14.04%	SLPP	13.10%
2015	NDF	NDF	11.02%	NDF	15.34%
2010	NDF	UPFA	11.57%	UPFA	16.66%
2005	UNP	UNP	10.45%	UPFA	12.89%
1999	UNP	PA	4.99%	PA	6.55%
1994	PA	PA	4.42%	PA	1.99%
1988	UNP	UNP	3.78%	UNP	2.54%
1982	UNP	UNP	4.49%	UNP	8.08%
Matches/Mean MAE	5/9	8/9	8.09%	9/9	9.65%

=== 2019 Sri Lankan Presidential Election ===
Party	Borella		Colombo Electoral District		Sri Lanka	
Party	Votes	%	Votes	%	Votes	%
NDF	27,436	56.28%	559,921	40.92%	5,564,239	41.99%
SLPP	18,850	38.67%	727,713	53.19%	6,924,255	52.25%
NPP	1,500	3.08%	53,803	3.93%	418,553	3.16%
Other Parties (with < 1%)	966	1.98%	26,740	1.95%	345,452	2.61%
Valid Votes	48,752	98.64%	1,368,177	98.89%	13,252,499	98.99%
Rejected Votes	672	1.36%	15,333	1.11%	135,452	1.01%
Total Polled	49,424	80.80%	1,383,510	82.82%	13,387,951	83.71%
Registered Electors	61,169		1,670,403		15,992,568	

=== 2015 Sri Lankan Presidential Election ===
Party	Borella		Colombo Electoral District		Sri Lanka	
Party	Votes	%	Votes	%	Votes	%
NDF	31,469	66.97%	725,073	55.93%	6,217,162	51.28%
UPFA	15,148	32.24%	562,614	43.40%	5,768,090	47.58%
Other Parties (with < 1%)	373	0.79%	8,673	0.67%	138,200	1.14%
Valid Votes	46,990	98.85%	1,296,360	98.83%	12,123,452	98.85%
Rejected Votes	547	1.15%	15,334	1.17%	140,925	1.15%
Total Polled	47,537	79.08%	1,311,694	81.34%	12,264,377	78.69%
Registered Electors	60,109		1,612,660		15,585,942	

=== 2010 Sri Lankan Presidential Election ===
Party	Borella		Colombo Electoral District		Sri Lanka	
Party	Votes	%	Votes	%	Votes	%
NDF	23,636	57.46%	533,022	45.90%	4,173,185	40.15%
UPFA	16,909	41.11%	614,740	52.93%	6,015,934	57.88%
Other Parties (with < 1%)	587	1.43%	13,620	1.17%	204,494	1.97%
Valid Votes	41,132	98.70%	1,161,382	99.03%	10,393,613	99.03%
Rejected Votes	543	1.30%	11,394	0.97%	101,838	0.97%
Total Polled	41,675	70.93%	1,172,776	76.09%	10,495,451	66.70%
Registered Electors	58,757		1,541,242		15,734,587	

=== 2005 Sri Lankan Presidential Election ===
Party	Borella		Colombo Electoral District		Sri Lanka	
Party	Votes	%	Votes	%	Votes	%
UNP	25,784	61.67%	569,627	51.12%	4,706,366	48.43%
UPFA	15,644	37.42%	534,431	47.96%	4,887,152	50.29%
Other Parties (with < 1%)	381	0.91%	10,192	0.91%	123,521	1.27%
Valid Votes	41,809	98.93%	1,114,250	98.86%	9,717,039	98.88%
Rejected Votes	453	1.07%	12,879	1.14%	109,869	1.12%
Total Polled	42,262	69.65%	1,127,129	75.85%	9,826,908	69.51%
Registered Electors	60,678		1,486,021		14,136,979	

=== 1999 Sri Lankan Presidential Election ===
Party	Borella		Colombo Electoral District		Sri Lanka	
Party	Votes	%	Votes	%	Votes	%
UNP	19,151	50.12%	425,185	44.08%	3,602,748	42.71%
PA	17,023	44.55%	474,310	49.18%	4,312,157	51.12%
JVP	1,289	3.37%	44,009	4.56%	343,927	4.08%
Other Parties (with < 1%)	750	1.96%	21,030	2.18%	176,679	2.09%
Valid Votes	38,213	97.31%	964,534	97.06%	8,435,754	97.69%
Rejected Votes	1,058	2.69%	29,197	2.94%	199,536	2.31%
Total Polled	39,271	70.97%	993,731	73.39%	8,635,290	72.17%
Registered Electors	55,338		1,354,025		11,965,536	

=== 1994 Sri Lankan Presidential Election ===
Party	Borella		Colombo Electoral District		Sri Lanka	
Party	Votes	%	Votes	%	Votes	%
PA	20,837	60.38%	557,708	64.82%	4,709,205	62.28%
UNP	13,162	38.14%	288,741	33.56%	2,715,283	35.91%
Other Parties (with < 1%)	513	1.49%	13,937	1.62%	137,040	1.81%
Valid Votes	34,512	98.24%	860,386	98.17%	7,561,526	98.03%
Rejected Votes	617	1.76%	16,060	1.83%	151,706	1.97%
Total Polled	35,129	67.55%	876,446	69.59%	7,713,232	69.12%
Registered Electors	52,007		1,259,484		11,158,880	

=== 1988 Sri Lankan Presidential Election ===
Party	Borella		Colombo Electoral District		Sri Lanka	
Party	Votes	%	Votes	%	Votes	%
UNP	16,452	52.67%	361,337	49.14%	2,569,199	50.43%
SLFP	13,083	41.88%	339,958	46.23%	2,289,857	44.95%
SLMP	1,702	5.45%	34,020	4.63%	235,701	4.63%
Valid Votes	31,237	98.43%	735,315	98.49%	5,094,754	98.24%
Rejected Votes	499	1.57%	11,295	1.51%	91,499	1.76%
Total Polled	31,736	66.23%	746,610	67.53%	5,186,256	55.87%
Registered Electors	47,917		1,105,583		9,283,143	

=== 1982 Sri Lankan Presidential Election ===
Party	Borella		Colombo Electoral District		Sri Lanka	
Party	Votes	%	Votes	%	Votes	%
UNP	21,383	62.93%	436,290	57.86%	3,450,815	52.93%
SLFP	10,946	32.22%	274,476	36.40%	2,546,348	39.05%
JVP	1,058	3.11%	28,580	3.79%	273,428	4.19%
LSSP	395	1.16%	9,655	1.28%	58,531	0.90%
Other Parties (with < 1%)	195	0.57%	5,030	0.67%	190,929	2.93%
Valid Votes	33,977	99.11%	754,031	98.95%	6,520,156	98.78%
Rejected Votes	305	0.89%	7,990	1.05%	80,470	1.22%
Total Polled	34,282	72.75%	762,021	76.88%	6,600,626	80.15%
Registered Electors	47,123		991,194		8,235,358	

== Parliamentary Election Results ==
=== Summary ===
The winner of Borella has matched the final country result 3 out of 7 times.

Year	Borella	Colombo Electoral District	MAE %	Sri Lanka	MAE %
2015	UNP	UNP	11.89%	UNP	15.94%
2010	UNP	UPFA	10.19%	UPFA	18.07%
2004	UNP	UNP	8.41%	UPFA	13.15%
2001	UNP	UNP	5.09%	UNP	8.78%
2000	UNP	UNP	4.10%	PA	8.34%
1994	UNP	PA	4.64%	PA	2.68%
1989	UNP	UNP	3.38%	UNP	4.19%
Matches/Mean MAE	3/7	5/7	6.82%	7/7	10.17%

=== 2020 Sri Lankan Parliamentary Election ===
Party	Borella		Colombo Electoral District		Sri Lanka	
Party	Votes	%	Votes	%	Votes	%
SJB	20,450	48.31%	387,145	32.73%	2,771,984	23.9%
SLPFA	17,680	41.76%	674,603	57.04%	6,853,693	59.09%
JJB	1,931	4.56%	67,600	5.72%	445,958	3.84%
UNP	1,500	3.54%	30,875	2.61%	249,435	2.15%
Other Parties (with < 1%)	774	1.83%	22,553	1.9%	1,227,859	11.02%
Valid Votes	42,335	68.4%	1,182,776	69.2%	11,598,936	71.32%
Rejected Votes	3,573	5.71%	81,034	4.74%	744,373	4.58%
Total Polled	45,872	74.11%	1,263,810	73.94%	12,343,309	75.89%
Registered Electors	61,897		1,709,209		16,263,885	

=== 2015 Sri Lankan Parliamentary Election ===
Party	Borella		Colombo Electoral District		Sri Lanka	
Party	Votes	%	Votes	%	Votes	%
UNP	28,968	66.29%	640,743	53.04%	5,098,916	45.77%
UPFA	11,842	27.10%	474,063	39.25%	4,732,664	42.48%
JVP	2,282	5.22%	81,391	6.74%	544,154	4.88%
Other Parties (with < 1%)	610	1.40%	11,752	0.97%	93,045	0.84%
Valid Votes	43,702	95.76%	1,207,949	96.46%	11,140,333	95.35%
Rejected Votes	1,902	4.17%	43,372	3.46%	516,926	4.42%
Total Polled	45,638	75.93%	1,252,271	78.93%	11,684,111	77.66%
Registered Electors	60,109		1,586,598		15,044,490	

=== 2010 Sri Lankan Parliamentary Election ===
Party	Borella		Colombo Electoral District		Sri Lanka	
Party	Votes	%	Votes	%	Votes	%
UNP	16,421	48.14%	339,750	36.19%	2,357,057	29.37%
UPFA	13,662	40.05%	480,896	51.23%	4,846,388	60.38%
DNA	3,619	10.61%	110,683	11.79%	441,251	5.50%
Other Parties (with < 1%)	411	1.20%	7,182	0.77%	47,940	0.60%
Valid Votes	34,113	94.34%	938,723	94.85%	8,026,322	96.03%
Rejected Votes	1,998	5.53%	50,354	5.09%	581,465	6.96%
Total Polled	36,160	61.54%	989,729	64.17%	8,358,246	59.29%
Registered Electors	58,757		1,542,457		14,097,690	

=== 2004 Sri Lankan Parliamentary Election ===
Party	Borella		Colombo Electoral District		Sri Lanka	
Party	Votes	%	Votes	%	Votes	%
UNP	21,543	52.70%	441,841	41.77%	3,486,792	37.73%
UPFA	12,484	30.54%	414,688	39.20%	4,223,126	45.70%
JHU	6,360	15.56%	190,618	18.02%	552,723	5.98%
Other Parties (with < 1%)	493	1.21%	10,713	1.01%	90,868	0.98%
Valid Votes	40,880	96.53%	1,057,860	96.47%	9,241,931	94.52%
Rejected Votes	1,457	3.44%	38,605	3.52%	534,452	5.47%
Total Polled	42,350	67.52%	1,096,571	74.71%	9,777,821	75.74%
Registered Electors	62,722		1,467,751		12,909,631	

=== 2001 Sri Lankan Parliamentary Election ===
Party	Borella		Colombo Electoral District		Sri Lanka	
Party	Votes	%	Votes	%	Votes	%
UNP	24,349	58.83%	546,417	51.62%	4,086,026	45.62%
PA	12,710	30.71%	353,401	33.39%	3,330,815	37.19%
JVP	2,872	6.94%	117,404	11.09%	815,353	9.10%
SU	785	1.90%	16,970	1.60%	50,665	0.57%
Other Parties (with < 1%)	672	1.62%	24,289	2.29%	510,616	5.70%
Valid Votes	41,388	96.28%	1,058,481	96.28%	8,955,844	94.77%
Rejected Votes	1,598	3.72%	40,901	3.72%	494,009	5.23%
Total Polled	42,986	70.04%	1,099,382	76.31%	9,449,878	76.03%
Registered Electors	61,373		1,440,682		12,428,762	

=== 2000 Sri Lankan Parliamentary Election ===
Party	Borella		Colombo Electoral District		Sri Lanka	
Party	Votes	%	Votes	%	Votes	%
UNP	19,588	48.81%	440,684	43.45%	3,451,765	40.12%
PA	14,025	34.95%	394,146	38.86%	3,899,329	45.33%
SU	2,106	5.25%	49,671	4.90%	127,859	1.49%
JVP	1,990	4.96%	78,133	7.70%	518,725	6.03%
NUA	1,441	3.59%	27,067	2.67%	185,593	2.16%
Other Parties (with < 1%)	980	2.44%	24,519	2.42%	189,490	2.20%
Valid Votes	40,130	N/A	1,014,220	N/A	8,602,617	N/A

=== 1994 Sri Lankan Parliamentary Election ===
Party	Borella		Colombo Electoral District		Sri Lanka	
Party	Votes	%	Votes	%	Votes	%
UNP	17,076	47.41%	385,100	41.77%	3,498,370	44.04%
PA	16,764	46.54%	469,642	50.94%	3,887,805	48.94%
MEP	1,345	3.73%	42,734	4.64%	68,538	0.86%
Other Parties (with < 1%)	419	1.16%	13,003	1.41%	51,995	0.65%
SLPF	414	1.15%	11,454	1.24%	90,078	1.13%
Valid Votes	36,018	95.94%	921,933	96.18%	7,943,688	95.20%
Rejected Votes	1,524	4.06%	36,635	3.82%	400,395	4.80%
Total Polled	37,542	72.19%	958,568	76.04%	8,344,095	74.75%
Registered Electors	52,007		1,260,686		11,163,064	

=== 1989 Sri Lankan Parliamentary Election ===
Party	Borella		Colombo Electoral District		Sri Lanka	
Party	Votes	%	Votes	%	Votes	%
UNP	17,324	56.45%	374,530	51.67%	2,838,005	50.71%
SLFP	8,721	28.42%	205,053	28.29%	1,785,369	31.90%
USA	1,745	5.69%	31,873	4.40%	141,983	2.54%
SLMC	1,604	5.23%	29,308	4.04%	202,016	3.61%
MEP	1,040	3.39%	76,966	10.62%	90,480	1.62%
Other Parties (with < 1%)	254	0.83%	7,112	0.98%	67,723	1.21%
Valid Votes	30,688	95.34%	724,842	95.36%	5,596,468	93.87%
Rejected Votes	1,501	4.66%	35,271	4.64%	365,563	6.13%
Total Polled	32,189	68.23%	760,113	69.87%	5,962,031	63.60%
Registered Electors	47,174		1,087,891		9,374,164	

== Demographics ==
=== Ethnicity ===
The Borella Polling Division has a Sinhalese majority (57.8%), a significant Sri Lankan Tamil population (19.9%) and a significant Moor population (19.1%) . In comparison, the Colombo Electoral District (which contains the Borella Polling Division) has a Sinhalese majority (76.5%), a significant Moor population (10.7%) and a significant Sri Lankan Tamil population (10.1%)

Ethnicity in Borella
1. Sinhalese (57.8%)
2. Sri Lankan Tamil (19.9%)
3. Moor (19.1%)
4. Other (1.90%)
5. Malay (1.30%)

=== Religion ===
The Borella Polling Division has a Buddhist majority (53.7%), a significant Muslim population (21.8%) and a significant Hindu population (13.2%) . In comparison, the Colombo Electoral District (which contains the Borella Polling Division) has a Buddhist majority (70.2%) and a significant Muslim population (11.8%)

Religion in Borella
1. Buddhist (53.7%)
2. Muslim (21.8%)
3. Hindu (13.2%)
4. Roman Catholic (8.10%)
5. Other Christian (3.00%)
6. Other (0.10%)
