= Sojitz Kelanitissa Power Station =

Power station in Kelanitissa, Colombo, Sri Lanka

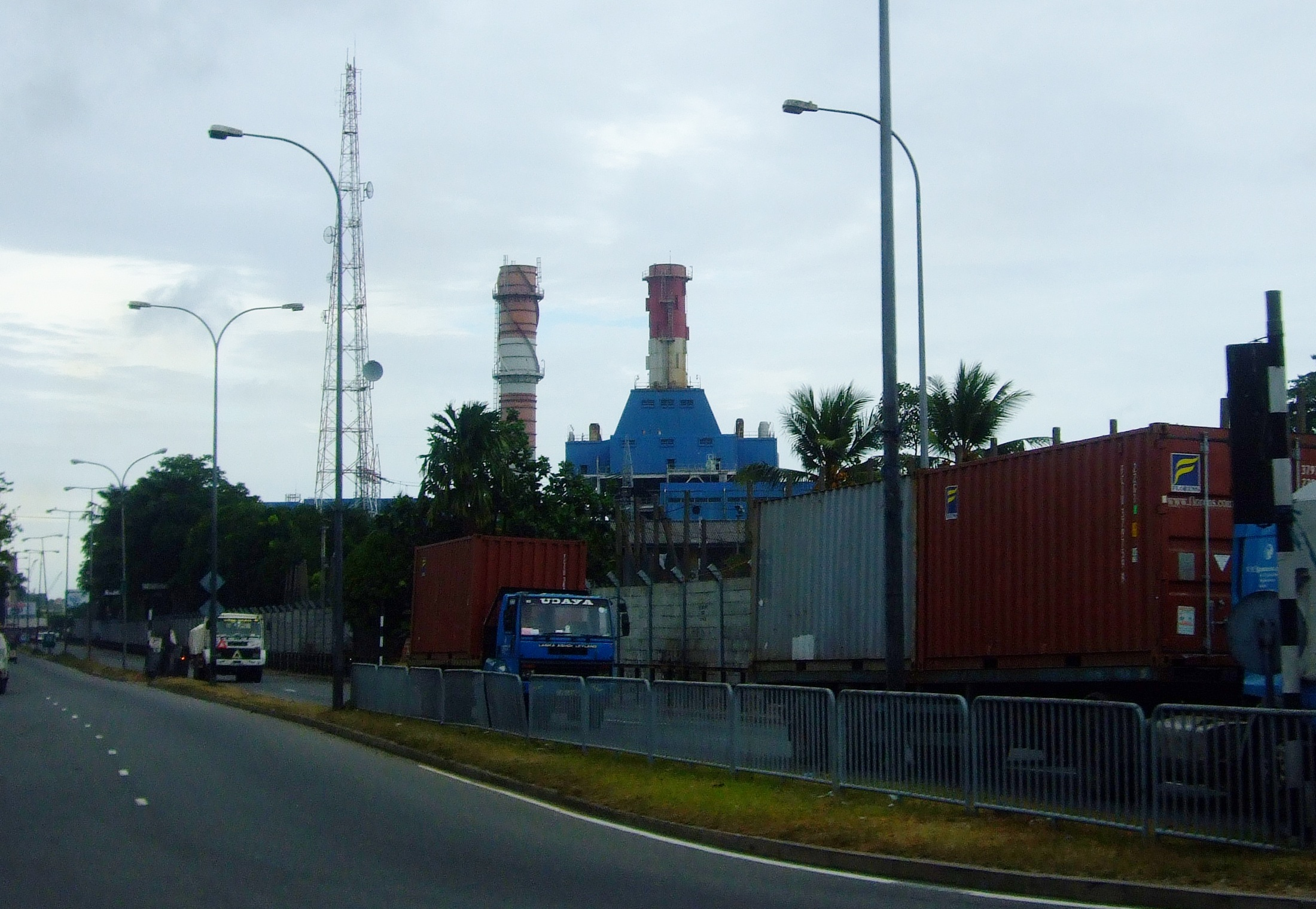
- Chimneys of the power station as seen from the southern-end of the Kelani Bridge, in August 2010.
- Country: Sri Lanka
- Location: Colombo
- Coordinates: 6°57′06″N 79°52′31″E
- Status: Operational
- Construction began: 15 July 2000
- Commission date: 10 October 2003
- Construction cost: $104 million (2000)
- Owners: CEB; Sojitz

Thermal power station
- Primary fuel: Diesel fuel
- Turbine technology: Gas turbine; Steam turbine

Power generation
- Units operational: 1 × 57 MW; 1 × 115 MW
- Make and model: BHEL (1); GE Power 9E.03 (1)
- Nameplate capacity: 163 MW

External links
- Website: www.skpl.lk

The Sojitz Kelanitissa Power Station (also known as Sojitz Power Station, and AES Kelanitissa Power Station), is privately owned 163 MW diesel-fired combined cycle power station located in Kelanitissa, in the city of Colombo, Sri Lanka. The plant was formerly owned by Sojitz Kelanitissa Private Limited, a subsidiary of Sojitz Corporation. The Ceylon Electricity Board acquired the power plant on 28 March 2023.

CEB's 2024 data lists the plant's installed capacity as 157 MW.

The power station is located adjacent to the Kelanitissa Power Station, which is a separate government-owned power station.

CEB's 2024 data lists two generating units at the plant, with capacities of 102 MW and 55 MW. The plant originally operated under a 20-year power purchase agreement with the Ceylon Electricity Board as an independent power producer on a build-own-operate-transfer basis. The agreement was signed in 2000 and was due to expire in 2023.

== History ==
Following a power supply shortage in the late 1990s, the Government of Sri Lanka expanded the role of independent power producers in electricity generation. Sojitz signed the Letter of Intent with the Ceylon Electricity Board on 17 December 1998, obtained the environmental approval on 4 November 1999, and signed the Power Purchase Agreement, Fuel Supply Agreement, Implementation Agreement, and Land Lease Agreement, on 5 July 2000. The project was developed on a build-own-operate-transfer (BOOT) basis under the power purchase agreement with the Ceylon Electricity Board.

Construction of power station commenced after the signing of EPC on 15 July 2000, and the combined cycle unit was installed on 8 February 2003. The plant officially commenced operations on 10 October 2003.

In 2004, fire broke out at Sojitz Kelanitissa Power Station. The power station was shut down for restoration in 2004–2005.

In 2016, Sojitz Corporation acquired a 90% equity interest in AES Kelanitissa Private Limited from AES Corporation.

AES Kelanitissa (Private) Limited subsequently changed its name to Sojitz Kelanitissa (Private) Limited in 2016. On 28 March 2023, the Ceylon Electricity Board acquired the power plant from Sojitz Kelanitissa Private Limited.

In 2024, the plant generated 89.713 GWh of gross electricity and 84.444 GWh of net electricity, with a plant factor of 6.51%.

== See also ==
- Kelanitissa Power Station
- List of power stations in Sri Lanka
