= St. Lucia's Cathedral =

Seat of the Archbishop of the Roman Catholic Archdiocese of Colombo in Sri Lanka

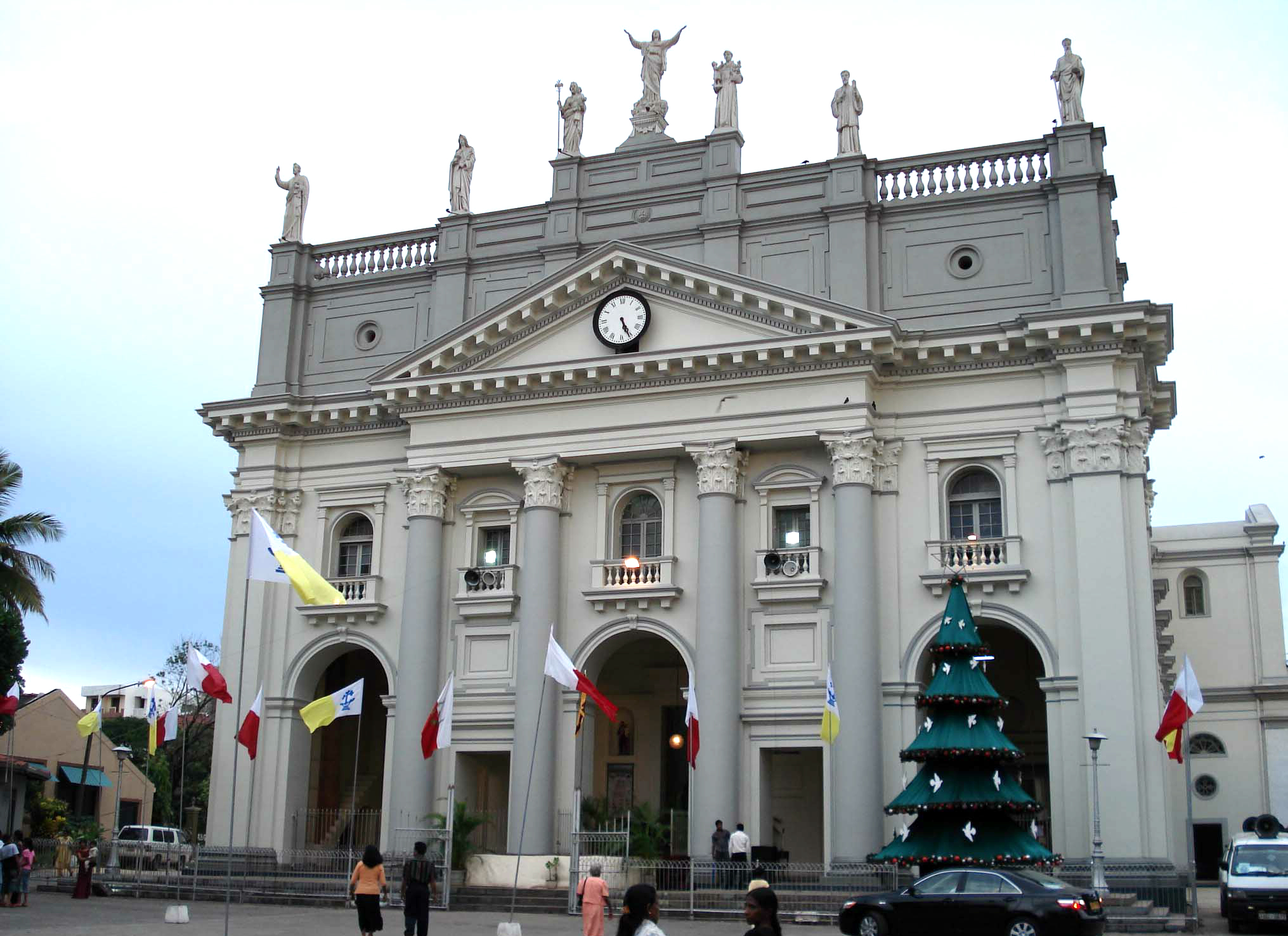

- Location within Colombo Municipality

Religion
- Affiliation: Roman Catholic
- Year consecrated: 1881; 145 years ago
- Status: Active

Location
- Location: Kotahena, Colombo, Sri Lanka
- Coordinates: 06°56′53″N 79°51′52″E

Architecture
- Architects: Bishop Hillarion Sillani; Fr. Stanislaus Tabarrani
- Style: Renaissance and Baroque
- Groundbreaking: 1782; 244 years ago
- Completed: 1902

Specifications
- Direction of façade: East
- Capacity: 6000
- Height (max): 46m (151 ft)

St. Lucia's Cathedral (Tamil: கொட்டாஞ்சேனை தூய லூசியா பேராலயம் Kottañchénai Thooya Lusiya Peraalayam), Sinhala: කොටහේන ශාන්ත ලුසියා ආසන දෙව්මැදුර Kothahena Santha Lusiya Asana Dewumædura) is the seat of the Archbishop of the Roman Catholic Archdiocese of Colombo in Sri Lanka. The cathedral is located at Kotahena, in the north east of Colombo, on 18,240 sq. ft. of land. It traces its origins to a small structure for worship built during the Dutch occupation.

== Architecture ==
Named after and dedicated to the virgin and martyr saint Saint Lucy, the cathedral is considered the oldest and largest parish cathedral in Sri Lanka. It is also widely regarded as the chapel of St. Benedict's College, serving for generations as the spiritual home of the Benedictine community, where students, clergy, and staff gather for major liturgical celebrations and religious ceremonies. Standing together in the historic heart of Kotahena, St. Lucia's Cathedral and St. Benedict's College remain closely connected through a shared legacy of faith, architecture, and tradition. The facade rests on massive lonic columns and is adorned with seven statues. Silhouetted against the sky is the cross on the concrete lantern crowning the dome, the pinnacle of the cathedral.

The interior of the cathedral consists of a row of ornate, larger-than-life statues of saints along the side aisles, sculptured and painted in minute detail; many of these statues were installed in 1924 by priest and artist Rev. Fr. J Milliner. Open confessionals of intricately carved dark wood are also placed along the aisles. On the left, in front of the sanctuary, is a unique dark-skinned Madonna called 'Our Lady of Kotahena', which is taken in procession during the annual celebrations. Altars of white marble are located in the transepts of the church with relics enshrined within them.

Surmounted on the main altar is a statue of St. Lucy holding up her eyes on the palm of her hand. The stained glass windows when lit by sunlight create a panorama of colour further enhancing the transepts of the church. In a far corner of the church is a circular baptismal font of white marble carved with cherubs, and crowned by a statue of John the Baptist. On going up the narrow staircase that leads to the choir loft, one encounters 'Anthony Thomas', an enormous bell weighing 4300 lbs. The bell has intricate engravings of elaborate floral wreaths and holy figures and symbols of Christianity, and it is the largest of the four bells shipped from Marseilles and christened at the cathedral in 1903. The choir loft also contains a unique pipe organ donated to the cathedral in 1934.

The view of the cathedral from the choir loft is a grand one, with the episcopal throne of the Archbishop of Colombo standing out as a majestic highlight in the sanctuary below.

== History ==
By 1779, the sizeable Catholic community in Dutch-administered Colombo had selected the hill at Kotahena to be the centre of worship. While there exist records of the Dutch government granting ten acres of land to these Catholics in 1779, there are no records to attest to the initiation of the small, thatched hut-like chapel that already existed on the land. This small and rustic structure is said to have been built by the Oratorian Fathers in 1760, although rumour suggests the structure as being even older. A larger church of brick and mortar began construction under the guidance of Fr. Nicholas Rodriguez and Fr. Cosmo Antonio in 1782, with the aim of replacing the smaller structure. In 1796, the newly built church provided refuge for many citizens of the city when the invading British encamped across the Kelani River.

By 1820, Kotahena had become the headquarters of the Oratorian Fathers. The church on the site naturally became the principal Catholic Church of Colombo, and of a newly unified British Ceylon. With the installation of Reverend Vincent Rozairo Dias as the first Vicar Apostolic of Colombo at St. Lucia's on 14 January 1838, the little church was elevated to cathedral status. Sixteen years later in 1836, the church saw its one of its most notable events, with the remains of Fr. Monteiro c’e Setuvel, one of the first missionaries in Ceylon, being brought in a procession and interred within it. Just a year later, the Most Rev. Vicente do Rosayro, an Oratorian from Goa was formally installed as the first Vicar Apostolic of Ceylon.

On 11 February 1846 the ceremony for the consecration of a bishop took place for the first time at St Lucia's, and with the Papal Rescript of 1857, St. Lucia's Church was confirmed to be the cathedral church of the Vicariate of Colombo. In September 1863, the Rt. Rev. Hilarion Silani was named Vicar Apostolic of Colombo, with Bishop Christophe Ernest Bonjean being the Vicar Apostolic of Jaffna. This began the period known as "the golden age" of the Catholic Church in Ceylon.

With the existing structure on the danger of collapse, Bishop Silani called a meeting of the priests and lay leaders of the city to initiate plans for building a new cathedral on 8 September 1872. Plans were drawn up to collect the necessary funds: the Catholics of Colombo, churches outside the city, and even the fisher folk contributed their share to the building fund. Fr. S. Tabarrani was entrusted with the work of designing and supervising the building of the new church. The following year saw the Feast of the Assumption held as a farewell to the old cathedral, with the work of dismantling it beginning in August of the same year. As an interim measure, nearby St. Benedict's College was converted into a public chapel to serve the Catholics of Kotahena.

The construction did not go to plan, however, with work having to be halted in 1877 due to a lack of funds. The following years saw more problems, with Bishop Silani dying in Rome in 1878, and Fr. Tabarrani leaving Ceylon in 1880 (and dying just two years later in Rome). Nevertheless, May 1880 saw Fr. Bonifiglio Baldoni take charge of the project, the four planned arches being completed by the end of August. Nearly a year later, "at 11.00, the last keystone was driven in place." The work on most of the main portion of the cathedral, despite the many problems in funding, had been completed. The church celebrated "the Great Day", with Bishop Clemente Pagnani (now Vicar Apostolic of Colombo) blessing the nave and the aisles of the new Cathedral and opening it for public worship. The highlight of the day was the first Holy Mass offered for the benefactors of the cathedral.

Construction remained incomplete, and in 1883 the newly appointed Vicar Apostolic, Bishop Bonjean, assigned Fr. Tanganelli to continue construction of the cathedral. Less than a year later, both men departed Ceylon—Bonjean for Rome and Tanganelli for China—leaving responsibility for the project to Fr. Joseph Mary Louise Boisseau.

By 1885, Boisseau had completed the sanctuary vault and the southern vault, with the final vault finished in December 1885. The remaining work was not fully completed until 1902, when the scaffolding was finally removed..

Pope Leo XIII, in his apostolic brief of 1885 conferred a number of privileges on St. Lucia's Cathedral, one of which was it being declared the cathedral church of the 'Vicariate of Colombo’. Bishop Bonjean returned to the island soon after this, bringing with him an authentic portion of the bones of St. Lucy, which are preserved in the cathedral to this day.

6 January 1887 was a significant date for Catholicism in Ceylon: the church's hierarchy was formally established, and the first episcopal synod was held in the country. A papal delegate and the bishops of the island were gathered in the cathedral to witness this singular event in the history of the church of Ceylon. On 12 December, the vigil for the feast of St. Lucy, the patroness of the newly completed cathedral, was formally held. With construction still ongoing, September 1889 saw the crypt dedicated to the Sacred Passion of the Lord being declared open for public worship. The first Holy Mass was celebrated on the first Friday of that month.

By the end of the construction project, the church had costed a total of Rs. 160,000- an enormous amount of money in the last century, provided by the Ceylonese Catholics of the time.

=== Recent history ===
- From 22 May to 15 July 1950, the world-famous statue of Our Lady of Fatima made a visit to various parishes in the country, including Kotahena.
- 1959 marked the 450th anniversary of the first Eucharistic celebration on Sri Lankan soil. The climax of the celebrations of this Eucharistic Congress was the procession with the Eucharist around the streets of Kotahena which continues to date.
- The Jubilee year began on the 5 August 1981, with Archbishop Nicholas Marcus Fernando celebrating the Eucharist and officially initiating it.
- The 1995 papal visit to Sri Lanka: Pope John Paul II visited the cathedral on 20 January while in the country to beatify Ven. Joseph Vaz, Apostle of Sri Lanka. The Pope also unveiled a mural of Blessed Joseph Vaz in the cathedral and gave the cathedral a chalice.
- With the structure having gone through nearly a century of wear and tear, with the dome in particular being damaged by the Japanese air raid over Colombo in 1942, Fr. Placidus De Silva began a large-scale restoration project to address many of these issues. Phase one of the restoration project, initially with a projected cost of Rs. 14 million (later increased to Rs. 20mn) thus began in 2005. The second and third phases of the project have also begun, with the parish council and the St. Lucia's Community Development Society gradually attempting to fundraise for the total Rs. 40 million (US$400,000) needed.

== Our Lady of Kotahena ==
In 1938, a statue of the Madonna and Baby Jesus was brought to the parish and called ‘Our Lady of Kotahena.’ This statue is taken round the streets of Kotahena in a procession every year during the month of May
