= Madampitiya =

Madampitiya හසලක மாதம்பிட்டி
- Suburb
- Location in Colombo District
- Coordinates: 6°57′38″N 79°52′20″E
- Country: Sri Lanka
- Province: Western Province
- District: Colombo District
- Time zone: UTC+5:30 (Sri Lanka Standard Time Zone)
- Postal Code: 01500

Madampitiya is a suburb in Colombo, Sri Lanka. It is part of the postal area Colombo 15.
