= Colombo Port Power Station =

Powership in Colombo Harbour, Sri Lanka

- Country: Sri Lanka
- Location: Port of Colombo
- Coordinates: 6°57′N 79°52′E
- Status: Operational
- Construction began: 1998
- Commission date: 1 June 2000
- Owners: Colombo Power; CEB

Thermal power station
- Primary fuel: Fuel oil
- Feed-in tariff: 6 penny (per kilowatt-hour)

Power generation
- Units operational: 4 × 15 MW
- Make and model: MAN Diesel SE 12K50MC-S (4)
- Nameplate capacity: 60 MW
- Annual net output: 494 GWh

The Colombo Port Power Station (also sometimes referred to as the Colombo Port Power Barge) is a 60-megawatt powership, permanently moored at the Colombo Harbour, in the Western Province of Sri Lanka. After the plant's 15-year license expired in 2015, the Ceylon Electricity Board purchased the powership in a controversial deal. It was previously owned by Colombo Power Private Limited, a 50-50 joint venture by Mitsui Engineering & Shipbuilding and Kawasho Corporation.

The powership consists of four 15 MW units, totalling the plant capacity to 60 MW. Although the plant is estimated to generate 420 GWh per annum, the actual average generation is 494 GWh, 74 GWh above initial estimates. The barge was built by Sasebo Heavy Industries, with funding from the Japan Bank for International Cooperation.

== See also ==
- List of power stations in Sri Lanka
