= Bloemendhal =

Bloemendhal බ්ලුමන්ඩාල් புளுமெண்டல்
- Suburb
- Location in Colombo District
- Coordinates: 6°57′19″N 79°52′11″E
- Country: Sri Lanka
- Province: Western Province
- District: Colombo District
- Time zone: UTC+5:30 (Sri Lanka Standard Time Zone)

Bloemendhal is a neighbourhood in Colombo, Sri Lanka, around Bloemendhal Road, in the Colombo 13 postal area. It is ward 5 of the Colombo Municipal Council. It is the site of a former garbage dump and has been home to low-income settlements.

== Administration ==
Bloemendhal is ward 5 of the 47 Colombo Municipal Council (CMC) wards.

== Garbage dump ==
In 1995, the Sri Lankan government acquired a 20-acre plot of land in the Bloemendhal neighbourhood for a flood-retention scheme. In 2001, the CMC signed a contract with a private firm, Burns Trading, paying it for the right to dump on the land. The agreement included clauses requiring Burns to turn the garbage into compost at its Sedawatte plant, which never happened. Burns claimed to own the land, but the Sri Lanka Land Reclamation and Development Corporation said it was state property and objected to the dumping.

In 2005, the garbage dump received roughly 650–750 tonnes of garbage daily. Before its closure, the open site covered 6.5 hectares, rose up to 30 metres in height, and held an estimated 1.5–2 million tonnes of waste.

In 2003, nearby residents and waste pickers depended on the dump for income. Following multiple fires linked to methane buildup and community protests, the site was closed in 2009 after a Supreme Court determination, and dumping was moved to Meethotamulla.

In 2017, the Ministry of Megapolis and Western Development announced plans to turn the site into an urban park or garden. During 2018 and 2019, fires broke out at the site.

== Housing and resettlement ==
The Bloemendhal area had low-income settlements, and in October 2014, the Urban Development Authority (UDA) completed a rehousing scheme for 366 families in the area.

In January 2022, a 452-unit UDA housing tower built by Access Engineering was nearing completion.
