= Colombo North Polling Division =

Colombo North
- Polling Division
- Coordinates: 6.961662°N 79.865974°E
- Country: Sri Lanka
- Province: Western Province, Sri Lanka
- Electoral District: Colombo Electoral District

Area
  - Total: 7.64 km^{2} (2.95 sq mi)

Population (2012)
  - Total: 121,603
  - Density: 15,917/km^{2} (41,220/sq mi)
- ISO 3166 code: EC-01A

The Colombo North Polling Division is a Polling Division in the Colombo Electoral District, in the Western Province, Sri Lanka.

== Presidential Election Results ==
=== Summary ===
The winner of Colombo North has matched the final country result 5 out of 9 times.

Year	Colombo North	Colombo Electoral District	MAE %	Sri Lanka	MAE %
2024	SJB	NPP	21.25%	NPP	16.35%
2019	NDF	SLPP	29.05%	SLPP	28.13%
2015	NDF	NDF	19.16%	NDF	23.46%
2010	NDF	UPFA	23.76%	UPFA	28.78%
2005	UNP	UNP	23.89%	UPFA	26.29%
1999	UNP	PA	15.22%	PA	16.82%
1994	PA	PA	3.37%	PA	0.95%
1988	UNP	UNP	14.36%	UNP	13.11%
1982	UNP	UNP	10.62%	UNP	14.07%
Matches/Mean MAE	5/9	8/9	17.85%	9/9	18.66%

=== 2024 Sri Lankan Presidential Election ===
Party	Colombo North		Colombo Electoral District		Sri Lanka	
Party	Votes	%	Votes	%	Votes	%
SJB	32,289	46.63%	342,108	25.64%	4,363,035	32.76%
NPP	17,978	25.96%	629,963	47.21%	5,634,915	42.31%
IND-16	15,692	22.66%	281,436	21.09%	2,299,767	17.27%
Other Parties (with < 1%)	2,330	3.36%	50,456	3.78%	679,118	5.10%
SLPP	954	1.58%	30,432	2.28%	342,781	2.57%
Valid Votes	69,243	96.82%	1,334,390	97.67%	13,319,616	97.80%
Rejected Votes	2,276	3.18%	31,796	2.33%	300,300	2.20%
Total Polled	71,519	73.26%	1,366,186	77.39%	13,619,916	79.46%
Registered Electors	97,620		1,765,351		17,140,354	

=== 2019 Sri Lankan Presidential Election ===
Party	Colombo North		Colombo Electoral District		Sri Lanka	
Party	Votes	%	Votes	%	Votes	%
NDF	52,983	72.94%	559,921	40.92%	5,564,239	41.99%
SLPP	16,986	23.38%	727,713	53.19%	6,924,255	52.25%
Other Parties (with < 1%)	1,590	2.19%	26,740	1.95%	345,452	2.61%
NPP	1,084	1.49%	53,803	3.93%	418,553	3.16%
Valid Votes	72,643	98.17%	1,368,177	98.89%	13,252,499	98.99%
Rejected Votes	1,355	1.83%	15,333	1.11%	135,452	1.01%
Total Polled	73,998	78.97%	1,383,510	82.82%	13,387,951	83.71%
Registered Electors	93,705		1,670,403		15,992,568	

=== 2015 Sri Lankan Presidential Election ===
Party	Colombo North		Colombo Electoral District		Sri Lanka	
Party	Votes	%	Votes	%	Votes	%
NDF	51,537	75.07%	725,073	55.93%	6,217,162	51.28%
UPFA	16,423	23.92%	562,614	43.40%	5,768,090	47.58%
Other Parties (with < 1%)	689	1.00%	8,673	0.67%	138,200	1.14%
Valid Votes	68,649	98.36%	1,296,360	98.83%	12,123,452	98.85%
Rejected Votes	1,146	1.64%	15,334	1.17%	140,925	1.15%
Total Polled	69,795	77.75%	1,311,694	81.34%	12,264,377	78.69%
Registered Electors	89,771		1,612,660		15,585,942	

=== 2010 Sri Lankan Presidential Election ===
Party	Colombo North		Colombo Electoral District		Sri Lanka	
Party	Votes	%	Votes	%	Votes	%
NDF	42,896	69.51%	533,022	45.90%	4,173,185	40.15%
UPFA	17,605	28.53%	614,740	52.93%	6,015,934	57.88%
Other Parties (with < 1%)	1,214	1.97%	13,620	1.17%	204,494	1.97%
Valid Votes	61,715	98.37%	1,161,382	99.03%	10,393,613	99.03%
Rejected Votes	1,022	1.63%	11,394	0.97%	101,838	0.97%
Total Polled	62,737	65.77%	1,172,776	76.09%	10,495,451	66.70%
Registered Electors	95,385		1,541,242		15,734,587	

=== 2005 Sri Lankan Presidential Election ===
Party	Colombo North		Colombo Electoral District		Sri Lanka	
Party	Votes	%	Votes	%	Votes	%
UNP	45,161	75.13%	569,627	51.12%	4,706,366	48.43%
UPFA	14,270	23.74%	534,431	47.96%	4,887,152	50.29%
Other Parties (with < 1%)	680	1.13%	10,192	0.91%	123,521	1.27%
Valid Votes	60,111	98.46%	1,114,250	98.86%	9,717,039	98.88%
Rejected Votes	939	1.54%	12,879	1.14%	109,869	1.12%
Total Polled	61,050	71.02%	1,127,129	75.85%	9,826,908	69.51%
Registered Electors	85,967		1,486,021		14,136,979	

=== 1999 Sri Lankan Presidential Election ===
Party	Colombo North		Colombo Electoral District		Sri Lanka	
Party	Votes	%	Votes	%	Votes	%
UNP	32,714	61.53%	425,185	44.08%	3,602,748	42.71%
PA	18,114	34.07%	474,310	49.18%	4,312,157	51.12%
JVP	1,281	2.41%	44,009	4.56%	343,927	4.08%
Other Parties (with < 1%)	1,058	1.99%	21,030	2.18%	176,679	2.09%
Valid Votes	53,167	97.42%	964,534	97.06%	8,435,754	97.69%
Rejected Votes	1,409	2.58%	29,197	2.94%	199,536	2.31%
Total Polled	54,576	70.47%	993,731	73.39%	8,635,290	72.17%
Registered Electors	77,447		1,354,025		11,965,536	

=== 1994 Sri Lankan Presidential Election ===
Party	Colombo North		Colombo Electoral District		Sri Lanka	
Party	Votes	%	Votes	%	Votes	%
PA	26,250	61.61%	557,708	64.82%	4,709,205	62.28%
UNP	15,924	37.37%	288,741	33.56%	2,715,283	35.91%
Other Parties (with < 1%)	434	1.02%	13,937	1.62%	137,040	1.81%
Valid Votes	42,608	97.83%	860,386	98.17%	7,561,526	98.03%
Rejected Votes	947	2.17%	16,060	1.83%	151,706	1.97%
Total Polled	43,555	68.56%	876,446	69.59%	7,713,232	69.12%
Registered Electors	63,528		1,259,484		11,158,880	

=== 1988 Sri Lankan Presidential Election ===
Party	Colombo North		Colombo Electoral District		Sri Lanka	
Party	Votes	%	Votes	%	Votes	%
UNP	22,389	63.26%	361,337	49.14%	2,569,199	50.43%
SLFP	10,744	30.36%	339,958	46.23%	2,289,857	44.95%
SLMP	2,259	6.38%	34,020	4.63%	235,701	4.63%
Valid Votes	35,392	98.20%	735,315	98.49%	5,094,754	98.24%
Rejected Votes	647	1.80%	11,295	1.51%	91,499	1.76%
Total Polled	36,039	66.56%	746,610	67.53%	5,186,256	55.87%
Registered Electors	54,149		1,105,583		9,283,143	

=== 1982 Sri Lankan Presidential Election ===
Party	Colombo North		Colombo Electoral District		Sri Lanka	
Party	Votes	%	Votes	%	Votes	%
UNP	29,380	69.03%	436,290	57.86%	3,450,815	52.93%
SLFP	10,641	25.00%	274,476	36.40%	2,546,348	39.05%
JVP	1,645	3.86%	28,580	3.79%	273,428	4.19%
ACTC	477	1.12%	3,022	0.40%	173,934	2.67%
Other Parties (with < 1%)	421	0.99%	11,663	1.55%	75,526	1.16%
Valid Votes	42,564	98.67%	754,031	98.95%	6,520,156	98.78%
Rejected Votes	575	1.33%	7,990	1.05%	80,470	1.22%
Total Polled	43,139	74.98%	762,021	76.88%	6,600,626	80.15%
Registered Electors	57,534		991,194		8,235,358	

== Parliamentary Election Results ==
=== Summary ===
The winner of Colombo North has matched the final country result 4 out of 9 times.

Year	Colombo North	Colombo Electoral District	MAE %	Sri Lanka	MAE %
2024	NPP	NPP	12.08%	NPP	5.01%
2020	SJB	SLPP	30.52%	SLPP	32.57%
2015	UNP	UNP	23.67%	UNP	26.98%
2010	UNP	UPFA	19.63%	UPFA	26.71%
2004	UNP	UNP	20.76%	UPFA	23.03%
2001	UNP	UNP	14.23%	UNP	17.52%
2000	UNP	UNP	13.34%	PA	17.70%
1994	UNP	PA	10.93%	PA	8.86%
1989	UNP	UNP	11.89%	UNP	12.95%
Matches/Mean MAE	4/9	7/9	17.45%	9/9	19.04%

=== 2024 Sri Lankan Parliamentary Election ===
Party	Colombo North		Colombo Electoral District		Sri Lanka	
Party	Votes	%	Votes	%	Votes	%
JJB	33,285	56.55%	788,636	68.63%	6,863,186	61.56%
SJB	18,883	32.08%	208,249	18.12%	1,968,716	17.66%
NDF	1,606	2,73%	51,020	4.44%	500,835	4.49%
UDV	738	1.25%	6,381	0.56%	83,488	0.75%
DLF	690	1.17%	4,900	0.43%	50,836	0.46%
Other Parties (with < 1%)	2,953	2.41%	22,553	5.04%	1,227,859	11.02%
Valid Votes	58,862	90.71%	1,149,125	84.83%	11,148,006	94.35%
Rejected Votes	6,028	9.29%	62,613	5.17%	667,240	5.65%
Total Polled	64,890	66.49%	1,211,738	68.64%	11,815,246	68.93%
Registered Electors	97,590		1,765,351		17,140,354	

=== 2020 Sri Lankan Parliamentary Election ===
Party	Colombo North		Colombo Electoral District		Sri Lanka	
Party	Votes	%	Votes	%	Votes	%
SJB	41,059	64.9%	387,145	32.73%	2,771,984	23.9%
SLPFA	16,775	26.52%	674,603	57.04%	6,853,693	59.09%
UNP	2,676	4.23%	30,875	2.61%	249,435	2.15%
JJB	1,230	1.94%	67,600	5.72%	445,958	3.84%
Other Parties (with < 1%)	1,523	2.41%	22,553	1.9%	1,227,859	11.02%
Valid Votes	63,263	67.54%	1,182,776	69.2%	11,598,936	71.32%
Rejected Votes	7,113	7.59%	81,034	4.74%	744,373	4.58%
Total Polled	70,376	75.13%	1,263,810	73.94%	12,343,309	75.89%
Registered Electors	93,672		1,709,209		16,263,885	

=== 2015 Sri Lankan Parliamentary Election ===
Party	Colombo North		Colombo Electoral District		Sri Lanka	
Party	Votes	%	Votes	%	Votes	%
UNP	50,571	80.13%	640,743	53.04%	5,098,916	45.77%
UPFA	10,256	16.25%	474,063	39.25%	4,732,664	42.48%
JVP	1,647	2.61%	81,391	6.74%	544,154	4.88%
Other Parties (with < 1%)	640	1.01%	11,752	0.97%	93,045	0.84%
Valid Votes	63,114	93.85%	1,207,949	96.46%	11,140,333	95.35%
Rejected Votes	4,055	6.03%	43,372	3.46%	516,926	4.42%
Total Polled	67,248	74.91%	1,252,271	78.93%	11,684,111	77.66%
Registered Electors	89,771		1,586,598		15,044,490	

=== 2010 Sri Lankan Parliamentary Election ===
Party	Colombo North		Colombo Electoral District		Sri Lanka	
Party	Votes	%	Votes	%	Votes	%
UNP	30,825	60.61%	339,750	36.19%	2,357,057	29.37%
UPFA	15,976	31.41%	480,896	51.23%	4,846,388	60.38%
DNA	3,226	6.34%	110,683	11.79%	441,251	5.50%
Other Parties (with < 1%)	831	1.63%	7,254	0.77%	48,012	0.60%
Valid Votes	50,858	91.79%	938,723	94.85%	8,026,322	96.03%
Rejected Votes	4,495	8.11%	50,354	5.09%	581,465	6.96%
Total Polled	55,404	58.08%	989,729	64.17%	8,358,246	59.29%
Registered Electors	95,385		1,542,457		14,097,690	

=== 2004 Sri Lankan Parliamentary Election ===
Party	Colombo North		Colombo Electoral District		Sri Lanka	
Party	Votes	%	Votes	%	Votes	%
UNP	40,387	70.21%	441,841	41.77%	3,486,792	37.73%
UPFA	12,724	22.12%	414,688	39.20%	4,223,126	45.70%
JHU	3,409	5.93%	190,618	18.02%	552,723	5.98%
Other Parties (with < 1%)	1,000	1.74%	10,713	1.01%	90,868	0.98%
Valid Votes	57,520	94.36%	1,057,860	96.47%	9,241,931	94.52%
Rejected Votes	3,431	5.63%	38,605	3.52%	534,452	5.47%
Total Polled	60,959	70.56%	1,096,571	74.71%	9,777,821	75.74%
Registered Electors	86,388		1,467,751		12,909,631	

=== 2001 Sri Lankan Parliamentary Election ===
Party	Colombo North		Colombo Electoral District		Sri Lanka	
Party	Votes	%	Votes	%	Votes	%
UNP	41,052	69.06%	546,417	51.62%	4,086,026	45.62%
PA	11,792	19.84%	353,401	33.39%	3,330,815	37.19%
JVP	3,098	5.21%	117,404	11.09%	815,353	9.10%
TULF	2,483	4.18%	12,696	1.20%	348,164	3.89%
Other Parties (with < 1%)	1,023	1.72%	28,563	2.70%	213,117	2.38%
Valid Votes	59,448	94.66%	1,058,481	96.28%	8,955,844	94.77%
Rejected Votes	3,352	5.34%	40,901	3.72%	494,009	5.23%
Total Polled	62,800	72.32%	1,099,382	76.31%	9,449,878	76.03%
Registered Electors	86,842		1,440,682		12,428,762	

=== 2000 Sri Lankan Parliamentary Election ===
Party	Colombo North		Colombo Electoral District		Sri Lanka	
Party	Votes	%	Votes	%	Votes	%
UNP	33,212	59.68%	440,684	43.45%	3,451,765	40.12%
PA	13,422	24.12%	394,146	38.86%	3,899,329	45.33%
NUA	3,149	5.66%	27,067	2.67%	185,593	2.16%
JVP	2,031	3.65%	78,133	7.70%	518,725	6.03%
CWC	1,099	1.97%	4,588	0.45%	22,985	0.27%
SU	1,043	1.87%	49,671	4.90%	127,859	1.49%
ACTC	910	1.64%	5,238	0.52%	27,289	0.32%
Other Parties (with < 1%)	782	1.41%	14,693	1.45%	139,216	1.62%
Valid Votes	55,648	N/A	1,014,220	N/A	8,602,617	N/A

=== 1994 Sri Lankan Parliamentary Election ===
Party	Colombo North		Colombo Electoral District		Sri Lanka	
Party	Votes	%	Votes	%	Votes	%
UNP	24,522	54.63%	385,100	41.77%	3,498,370	44.04%
PA	18,140	40.41%	469,642	50.94%	3,887,805	48.94%
IND1	1,254	2.79%	9,251	1.00%	48,199	0.61%
Other Parties (with < 1%)	973	2.17%	57,940	6.28%	162,412	2.04%
Valid Votes	44,889	94.54%	921,933	96.18%	7,943,688	95.20%
Rejected Votes	2,593	5.46%	36,635	3.82%	400,395	4.80%
Total Polled	47,482	74.74%	958,568	76.04%	8,344,095	74.75%
Registered Electors	63,528		1,260,686		11,163,064	

=== 1989 Sri Lankan Parliamentary Election ===
Party	Colombo North		Colombo Electoral District		Sri Lanka	
Party	Votes	%	Votes	%	Votes	%
UNP	22,052	66.46%	374,530	51.67%	2,838,005	50.71%
SLFP	5,691	17.15%	205,053	28.29%	1,785,369	31.90%
SLMC	2,786	8.40%	29,308	4.04%	202,016	3.61%
USA	1,680	5.06%	31,873	4.40%	141,983	2.54%
MEP	732	2.21%	76,966	10.62%	90,480	1.62%
Other Parties (with < 1%)	239	0.72%	7,112	0.98%	67,723	1.21%
Valid Votes	33,180	93.10%	724,842	95.36%	5,596,468	93.87%
Rejected Votes	2,460	6.90%	35,271	4.64%	365,563	6.13%
Total Polled	35,640	66.80%	760,113	69.87%	5,962,031	63.60%
Registered Electors	53,356		1,087,891		9,374,164	

== Demographics ==
=== Ethnicity ===
The Colombo North Polling Division has a Sri Lankan Tamil plurality (42.6%), a significant Sinhalese population (33.2%) and a significant Moor population (20.3%) . In comparison, the Colombo Electoral District (which contains the Colombo North Polling Division) has a Sinhalese majority (76.5%), a significant Moor population (10.7%) and a significant Sri Lankan Tamil population (10.1%)

Ethnicity in Colombo North
1. Sri Lankan Tamil (42.6%)
2. Sinhalese (33.2%)
3. Moor (20.3%)
4. Indian Tamil (2.50%)
5. Other (1.30%)

=== Religion ===
The Colombo North Polling Division has a Hindu plurality (31.1%), a significant Muslim population (21.5%), a significant Roman Catholic population (21.3%) and a significant Buddhist population (20.4%) . In comparison, the Colombo Electoral District (which contains the Colombo North Polling Division) has a Buddhist majority (70.2%) and a significant Muslim population (11.8%)

Religion in Colombo North
1. Hindu (31.1%)
2. Muslim (21.5%)
3. Roman Catholic (21.3%)
4. Buddhist (20.4%)
5. Other Christian (5.60%)
6. Other (0.10%)
