= Theatre of Sri Lanka =

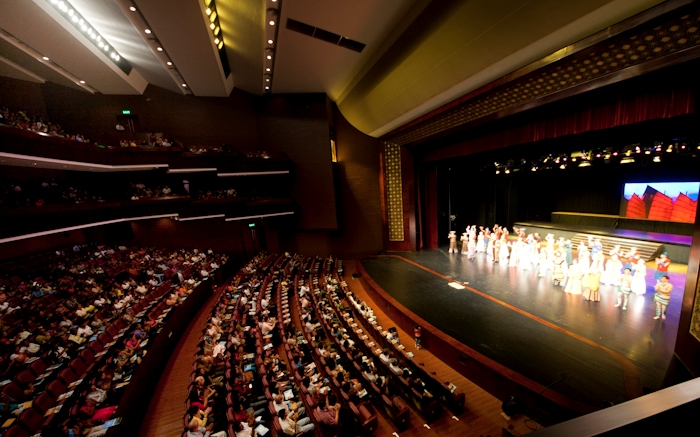
An audience watches a performance at the Nelum Pokuna Mahinda Rajapaksa Theatre

Theatre of Sri Lanka encompasses many different languages and traditions. Sinhalese theatre originated from traditional rituals and folk dramas in the 19th century; prior to this period, the art was confined to small villages and did not feature a sophisticated tradition, in contrast with neighboring India. Influential dramatist Ediriweera Sarachchandra attributes this to the influence of Theravada Buddhism, which he believes to have "tended more toward solitary contemplation and the attainment of insight than towards congregational practices or participation in community life".

== History ==
=== Early forms ===
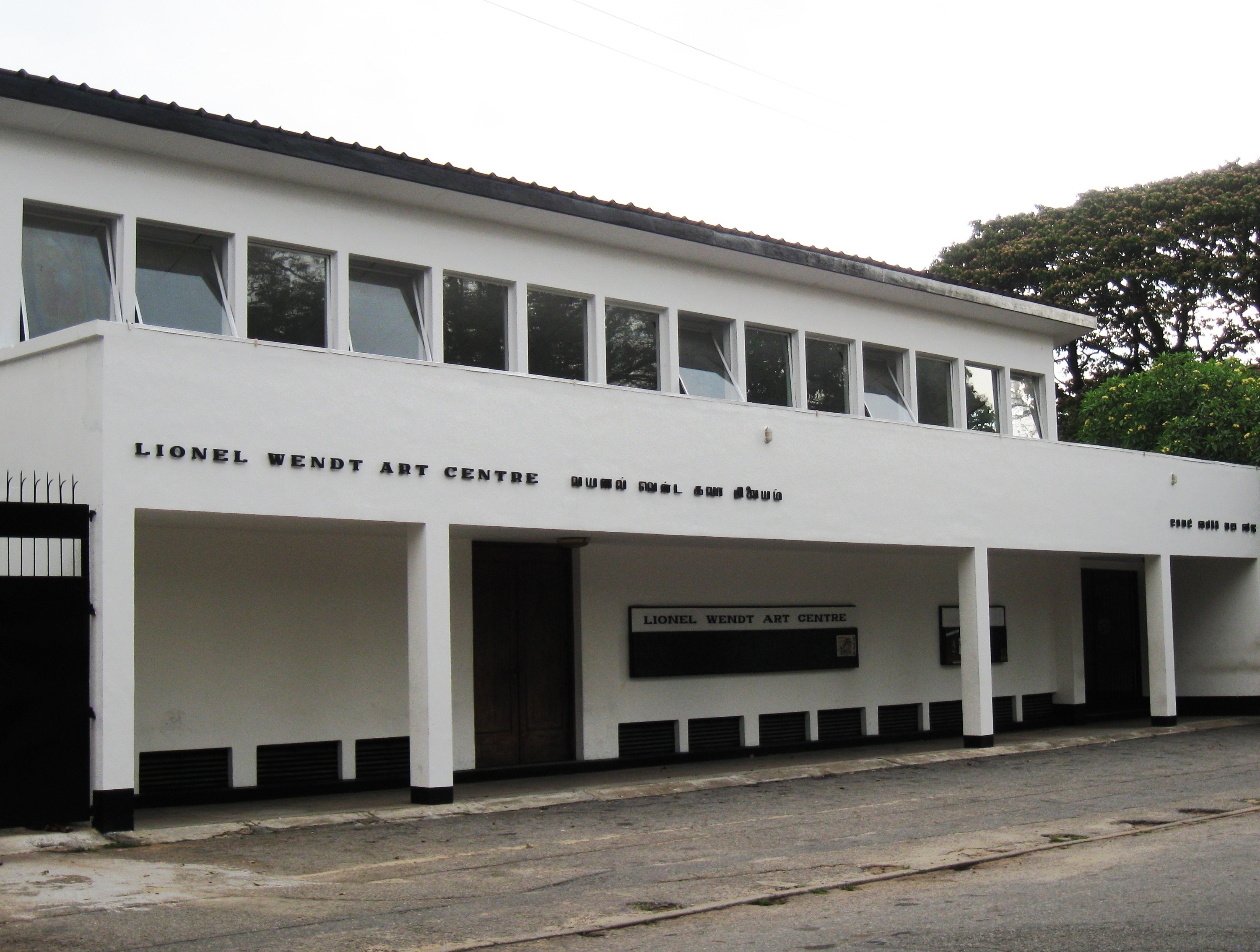
Lionel Wendt Art Centre

Dramas in Sri Lanka began first with ritualistic performances of early polytheistic religions. Originating from masked dances that took on the roles of gods and demons in ritualistic practices, the theatre tradition gradually became free of religion and crystallised into an organized form of entertainment.

With the arrival of Europeans and urbanisation, the Sinhalese began to view theatre as a serious and secular art. At first, urban dramas were derivative borrowing heavily from English drama, or from Parsi theatre musicals (nurti) and Bombay and South Indian operatic plays (nadagam). These catered to a small audience and drew the ire of strict Buddhists who considered them worthless. They were further attacked by the development of a "Protestant" Buddhism, a revival of the religion that stressed strict adherence to its law. Therefore, the words kolam and nadagam took a connotation of something ridiculous or nonsense in Sinhala.

It would take until the 1950s for serious Sinhala dramas to develop. With the independence of Ceylon from Great Britain and a widespread appreciation of Sinhala culture, Ediriweera Sarachchandra led the movement for serious Sinhala theatre. Sarachchandra's work, which brought together elements of the early folk ritual and dance drama tradition with Western theatre methods and stage style, created a new genre of theatre that appealed to all classes.

== Major Venues ==
Major theatres in Sri Lanka include

1. King George Hall (KGH) of the University of Colombo;
2. Navarangahala of the Royal College, Colombo;
3. Elphinstone Theatre Maradana
4. Nelum Pokuna Mahinda Rajapaksa Theatre.
5. Lionel Wendt Art Centre
6. Nelung Arts Centre combine live theatre and art exhibition, with exhibition galleries and theatres.
7. Tower Hall Theatre Maradana
8. Lumbini Theatre Colombo Lumbini Vidyalaya
9. Namel – Malini Punchi Theatre Borella Colombo 8
10. Y.M.B.A Borella
11. Sudarshi Open Theater colombo 7
12. Sarasavipaya colombo 1
13. BMICH Kamatha Open Theatre colombo 7
14. Viharamahadevi Open Air Theatre colombo 7
15. New Town Hall Auditorium Colombo Municipal Council colombo 7
16. Prof. Ediriweera Sarachchandra Open Air Theatre University of Peradaniya Kandy galaha junction not open to outside visitors only university students
