= Royal College Orchestra =

- Orchestra
- Founded: 2003
- Concert hall: Royal College Hall
- Website: www.saga.lk/orchestrahistory.html

Royal College Orchestra is a symphony orchestra at the Royal College Colombo. It comprises 50 to 60 players, all students from Royal College.

== History ==
The Royal College Orchestra was formed in 2003, with a collection of dedicated Royalists who loved music. In its year of inception they performed in small events within the school. The first major event was held in 2004 Galle Face the leaving ceremony of the out going Principal, H.L.B. Gomes and the welcoming ceremony of the new Principal, Upali Gunasekara. At this stage it had grown to a strength of 42 Members and entered the All Island Orchestral Competition, emerging as runner up. Since then they have maintained first place consecutively and take part in the annual musical festival SAGA.
