= Saga (event) =

- Genre: Multi
- Dates: February (2 days)
- Location: Sri Lanka
- Years active: 2004-Present

Saga is an annual musical festival organized by Royal College Colombo. The first SAGA was held in 2004 and since then has become an important event on Colombo's cultural calendar. It is named after the ancient Greek epic poems the Odyssey and the Iliad attributed to Homer. In the aspect of oriental music the term referred to the oriental version of sing musical scales as ‘Sa’ refers to the oriental equivalent of the 1st degree- “Do” while “Ga” refers to the equivalent of the 3rd degree, or “Me”

== History ==
For many years before Saga, an annual concert performed by the Royal College Hostel named Miyasi Meerawaya. Miyasi Meerawaya was limited to hostelers, however Upali Gunasekara, the newly appointed Principal of Royal College Colombo wished to broaden the scope for every one to perform. As a result, Saga I was organized in 2004 with the leadership of Principal Upali Gunasekara and Music Teacher Ashoka Pushpakumara. The project was joined by the School Development Society of the College which was in the process of developing a fundraising event to help development projects within the school. With it the two projects merged becoming one of the largest national events. Over the years dance and drama were added to the event.

Saga V, held in 2009 suffered a major set back as it was cancelled mid-show, in the wake of LTTE air raid on Colombo. Proving to be a defining moment, for the first time in Sri Lanka history an event cancelled due to a public emergency was held again as Saga V Plus to much praise and critical acclaim.

The following year, Saga VI held special meaning for the school, as it was held on the eve of Royal College's 175th Anniversary in 2010. The event was held at Navarangahala within the school with a theme that showcased changes in music that had taken place from 1835–2010.

Saga VII, became the first musical event organized by a school to be held at the newly built Nelum Pokuna Mahinda Rajapaksa Theatre.

== Venues ==
- Bandaranaike Memorial International Conference Hall
- Navarangahala
- Nelum Pokuna Mahinda Rajapaksa Theatre
- Sugathadasa Indoor Stadium
