= S. W. Dassenaike =

Stephen William Dassenaike (21 December 1874 - 1935) was a Ceylonese engineer and politician.

Dassenaike was born on 21 December 1874, the only son of John Louis Dassenaike (Atapattu Mudaliyar) and de Livera. He studied at Royal College, Colombo, receiving an English University Scholarship and going on to study engineering at the Royal Indian Engineering College in Surrey. Upon his return to Ceylon he took up a position in the Public Works Department as an engineer.

Following his retirement he was elected on 13 June 1931 to the 1st State Council of Ceylon, representing Colombo South, and served on the executive committee for Communications and Works.

He married Ethel Louise née Joseph (1876–1926) on 23 February 1903 at the Dutch Reformed Church, Bambalapitiya. They had a daughter, Leah Boyd (1906–1965), who married Harold Peiris, a lawyer and philanthropist.
