= Harold Peiris =

Sri Lankan artist, scholar, and translator

- Born: 22 July 1905; Sri Lanka
- Died: 1981
- Education: Royal College, Colombo, St. John's College, Cambridge
- Occupations: artist, scholar and translator

Harold Peiris (1904–1981) was a Sri Lankan lawyer, author, scholar, teacher, patron of the arts, and philanthropist. He was the co-founder of the Lionel Wendt Art Centre and its sole life-trustee. He is sometimes confused with Harry Pieris, a cousin and contemporary, who was a member of the Colombo '43 Group of artists and established the Sapumal Foundation.

Born to a celebrated wealthy aristocratic family, he was the only son of Charles Peiris, the younger brother of the more famous Sir James Peiris, and Maude de Mel, who was a sister of Sir Henry de Mel. He was a great-grandson of Sir Charles Henry de Soysa. Educated at Royal College, Colombo and St. John's College, Cambridge, Harold graduated with a degree in law and became a barrister at Lincoln's Inn. Peiris was one of the co-founders of the Lionel Wendt Art Centre that was opened in 1953 in memory of artist Lionel Wendt. The second gallery of the center is named Harold Peiris Gallery in his honor. Fluent in several languages, including Pali, Sanskrit and Latin, he translated to Sinhalese the Gita Govinda in collaboration with George Keyt in 1940 and in collaboration with L.C. Van Geyzel, translated most of the poems and plays of Kālidāsa in 1961.

Harold Peiris was married first in 1928 to Leah, daughter of S. W. Dassenaike, a retired Public Works Department engineer and a member of the Legislative Council of Ceylon, and second to Alicia "Peggy" Keyt sister of the artist George Keyt in 1940. Several mansions that were once owned by his family were either gifted or acquired by prominent institutions of Colombo, including Bishop's College, Colombo, St Bridget's Convent, Colombo and the Durdans Hospital. The Nelung Arts Centre was founded by his niece Niloufer Peiris. Peiris is sometimes confused with Harry Pieris, a member of the Colombo '43 Group, who founded the Sapumal Foundation in 1974 to which he bequeathed his house and art collection.
