= Sri Jayawardenepura Maha Vidyalaya =

Coordinates: 6.893°N 79.900°E

CMS Sri Jayawardenepura College
- Sri Jayawardenapura Kotte; Sri Lanka

Information
- Former names: Cotta Institute (1822-1855); CMS Boys' School (1855-1934); Christian College (1934-1964)
- Type: Public
- Motto: Latin: Perseverando Vincimus
- Established: 1822; 204 years ago
- Principal: Gamini Hettiarachchi
- Colors: Maroon and silver
- Website: https://srijayawardenapuracollege.com/

CMS Sri Jayawardenepura College is a government school in Kotte, Sri Lanka.

== History ==
It was formerly known as Christian College until 1964 when the administration of the school was taken over by the government. The school traces its roots to 1822 when the Cotta Institute was established as a seminary for young Ceylonese of which the first principal was Rev. Samuel Lambrick.

The third principal of the academy was Rev Joseph Marsh, who later became the first Head Master of Colombo Academy present Royal College Colombo in 1835. From 1855 to 1934 it was known as the Church Mission Society (CMS) Boys' School at Sri Jayawardenapura Kotte. The CMS Boys' School was a training institute for young Ceylonese, inclined to teach the gospel. The last principal of C.M.S. Christian College [1959-1963] was Samuel Louis Alexander Ratnayake. Himself an old boy of Christian College, he added new buildings and organised many colourful activities, such as drama festivals, sports, and carnivals in addition to prize giving and sports meets. The school community was a mix of different ethnic groups and religions.

== Principals ==
- Samuel Lambrick (1822-?)
- Joseph Marsh
- Samuel Louis Alexander Ratnayake
- Gamini Hettiarachchi (2022-?)

== Notable alumni ==
- Anagarika Dharmapala - Buddhist revivalist and a writer
- John de Silva - playwright
- Ananda Samarakoon - composer and musician
- P. D. Premasiri - professor specialising in Buddhist ethics and philosophy at the University of Peradeniya
