= Boake Gates =

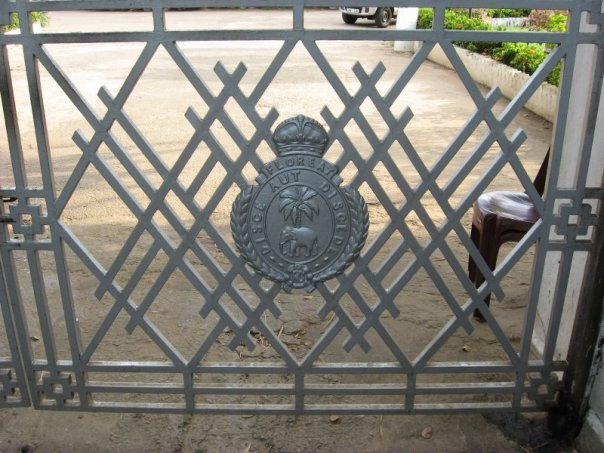
One of the Boake Gates, adorned with the pre-1954 crest

The Boake Gates (officially Boake Memorial Gates) at Royal College Colombo are three entrances to the main building along Rajakeeya Mawatha in Colombo. Erected in 1938, the gates stand as a symbol for the college's traditions and culture.

The gates were built in memory of Rev. Dr. Barcroft Boake, who served as headmaster of the Colombo Academy, the forerunner to the Royal College Colombo from 1842 to 1870. His son Rev W. H. Boake bequeathed £250 in his will to the Lord Bishop of Colombo to be used at Royal College in the memory of his father. This money was used to build a set of wrought iron gates which were named the Boake Memorial Gates, replacing the wooden gates that had been installed when the new Royal College building was built in 1923.

The gates were made under the supervision of Kenneth de Kretser, CMG; the Director of Public Works and were designed by Tom Neville Wynne-Jones. The opening ceremony was held on 13 January 1938 by Miss Carpenter-Garnier the sister of the Bishop of Colombo, who was in fact due to open the gates however had fallen ill.

The gates are made of wrought iron, with brick piers. There are three sets of gates with each larger main gates flanked by two smaller side gates. The main gates are adorned with the pre-1954 crest of the college. One of sides of the gates include inscriptions in memory of Rev. Boake. The side gates remain open throughout the year, while the centre gates remain closed except for rare occasions. The school's War Memorial was located between the centre gates and the main entrance of the College Main Hall.

== See also ==
- Royal College Colombo
- Van Wickle Gates
