= Barcroft Boake =

Barcroft Boake may refer to:

- Barcroft Boake (poet) (1866–1892), Australian poet
- Barcroft Boake (educator) (1814–1876), Irish-born clergyman and educator
- Barcroft Capel Boake (1838–1921), Australian photographer
