= Thomas de Sampayo =

Hon. Sir Sir Thomas de Sampayo KC
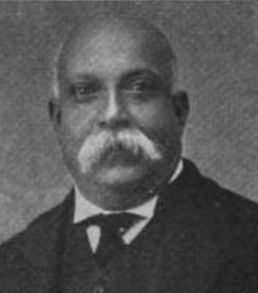

Puisne Justice of the Supreme Court of Ceylon

Personal details
- Born: 10 September 1855 Colombo, Ceylon
- Died: 1927 (aged 71–72)
- Education: St.Benedict's College, Clare College, Cambridge, Royal College Colombo
- Profession: Lawyer

Sir Thomas Edward de Sampayo, KC (1855–1927) was a Ceylonese judge and lawyer. He was a judge of the Supreme Court of Ceylon.

== Biography ==
Born to Maha Vidane Mudaliar Gabriel de Sampayo in Colombo on 10 September 1855, he was educated at St. Benedict's College (former Kottanchina Seminary) before gaining a Queen's scholarship to study at the Colombo Academy (now Royal College, Colombo). He excelled in school, winning the Form Prize, Prizes for Latin and Maths, and the coveted Turnour Prize. Thereafter he won the English University Scholarship to University of Cambridge and study at Clare College, Cambridge graduating in 1881 with a LLB. In later years he would name his mansion at Silversmith Street Clareden after Clare College. After graduating he was called to the Bar from the Middle Temple the same year.

On returning to Ceylon he started his legal practice in Colombo. He also served as a lecturer and examiner at the newly established Ceylon Law College, and as co-editor of the Ceylon Law Reports. He also translated Johannes Voet's title on Donations into English. Gradually he came to the notice of leader of the bar, Frederick Dornhorst and well-known proctor F.J. de Saram. He declined appointment as a District Judge as well the offer of a senior position in the Crown. By 1903 he was enjoying a successful career, and was sworn in as a King's Counsel with Ponnambalam Ramanathan and Frederick Dornhorst the first "silks" of the Bar of Ceylon. The same year he accepted appointment as a Commissioner of Assize. In 1915 he was appointed a Puisne Justice and made a senior Puisne Justice in 1922. He functioned as Acting Chief Justice on several occasions, and in the 1924 Birthday Honours was made Knight Bachelor by the King.

A devoted Christian, he was the first President of the Catholic Union of Ceylon. The Pope conferred on him the award of Knight Commander in the Holy Order of St. Gregory the Great.
