= Dudley de Silva =

Sri Lankan educationist (1911-1974)

Dudley Kenneth George de Silva
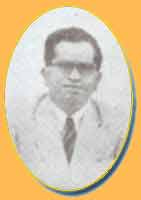
- Born: 27 July 1911; Colombo, Sri Lanka
- Died: 29 June 1974 (aged 62)
- Education: Royal College, Colombo, University College Colombo
- Occupation: Educator
- Parent: Arthur Henry George de Silva

Dudley Kenneth George de Silva (1911–1974) was a Sri Lankan educationist. Born in Ceylon, he was educated at Royal College Colombo and at the University College Colombo where he gained a BSc and later gained a Diploma in Education.

He taught at Kingswood College, Kandy and became Principal of the Wanduramba Central School and of the Piliyandala Central College. He was an Education Officer in Charge of Adult Education. Thereafter he became the Principal of his alma mater, Royal College Colombo from 1954 to 1966. In 1966 he was made Director of Technical Education, Ministry of Education.

Long after retiring as Principal, Royal College Colombo, he took up post as Principal, Pembroke Academy, Flower Road, Colombo 7.

He was an organist at St. Paul's Church Milagiriya and St. Paul's Church Kandy. The Dudley de Silva Shield is awarded at the annual hockey encounter between Royal College Colombo and Wesley College, Colombo in his memory.
