= Kurunduwatta (Thimbirigasyaya) Grama Niladhari Division =

Kurunduwatta
- Grama Niladhari Division
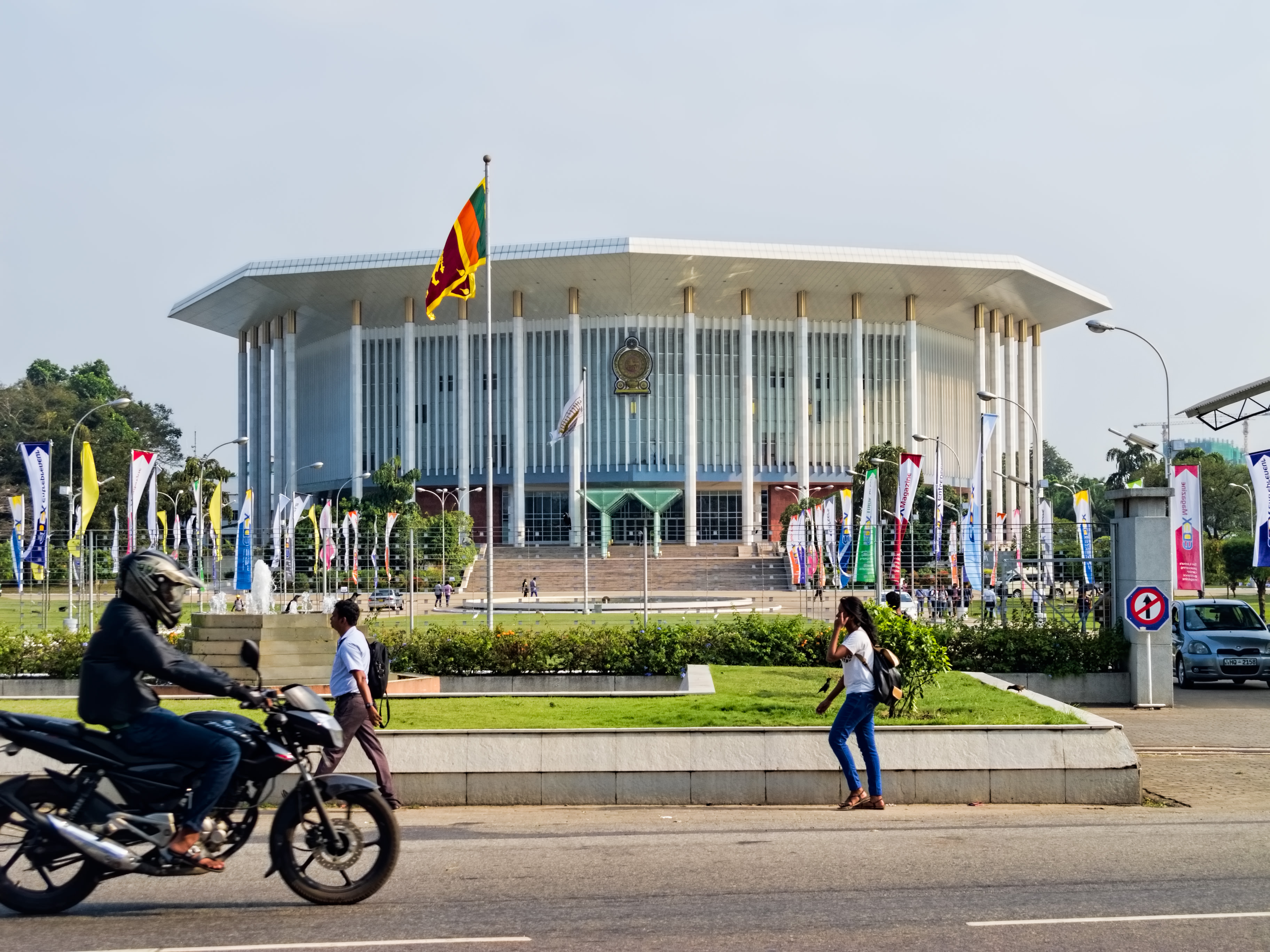
- Cinnamon Gardens is located within, nearby or associated with the Kurunduwatta Grama Niladhari Division
- Interactive map of Kurunduwatta
- Coordinates: 6.911148°N 79.867659°E
- Country: Sri Lanka
- Province: Western Province
- District: Colombo District
- Divisional Secretariat: Thimbirigasyaya Divisional Secretariat
- Electoral District: Colombo Electoral District
- Polling Division: Borella Polling Division

Area
  - Total: 3.89 km^{2} (1.50 sq mi)
- Elevation: 17 m (56 ft)

Population (2012)
  - Total: 9,865
  - Density: 2,536/km^{2} (6,570/sq mi)
- ISO 3166 code: LK-1127015

Kurunduwatta

Kurunduwatta Grama Niladhari Division is a Grama Niladhari Division of the Thimbirigasyaya Divisional Secretariat of Colombo District of Western Province, Sri Lanka.

Colombo International School, Nelum Pokuna Mahinda Rajapaksa Theatre, Department of National Archives, Nondescripts Cricket Club Ground, Singhalese Sports Club Cricket Ground, National Institute of Business Management (Sri Lanka), Town Hall, Colombo, Cinnamon Gardens, National Museum of Natural History, Colombo and Independence Memorial Museum are located within, nearby or associated with Kurunduwatta.

Kurunduwatta is a surrounded by the Ibbanwala, Borella South, Milagiriya, Narahenpita, Bambalapitiya, Borella North, Kollupitiya, Kuppiyawatta West and Thimbirigasyaya Grama Niladhari Divisions.

== Demographics ==
=== Ethnicity ===
The Kurunduwatta Grama Niladhari Division has a Sinhalese majority (73.9%) and a significant Sri Lankan Tamil population (14.5%). In comparison, the Thimbirigasyaya Divisional Secretariat (which contains the Kurunduwatta Grama Niladhari Division) has a Sinhalese majority (52.8%), a significant Sri Lankan Tamil population (28.0%) and a significant Moor population (15.1%)

Ethnicity in Kurunduwatta
1. Sinhalese (73.9%)
2. Sri Lankan Tamil (14.5%)
3. Moor (7.80%)
4. Other (1.60%)
5. Indian Tamil (1.30%)
6. Other (1.00%)

=== Religion ===
The Kurunduwatta Grama Niladhari Division has a Buddhist majority (63.5%) and a significant Hindu population (12.7%). In comparison, the Thimbirigasyaya Divisional Secretariat (which contains the Kurunduwatta Grama Niladhari Division) has a Buddhist plurality (47.9%), a significant Hindu population (22.5%) and a significant Muslim population (17.4%)

Religion in Kurunduwatta
1. Buddhist (63.5%)
2. Hindu (12.7%)
3. Roman Catholic (9.90%)
4. Muslim (9.00%)
5. Other Christian (4.20%)
6. Other (0.70%)

== Gallery ==
Nelum Pokuna Mahinda Rajapaksa Theatre

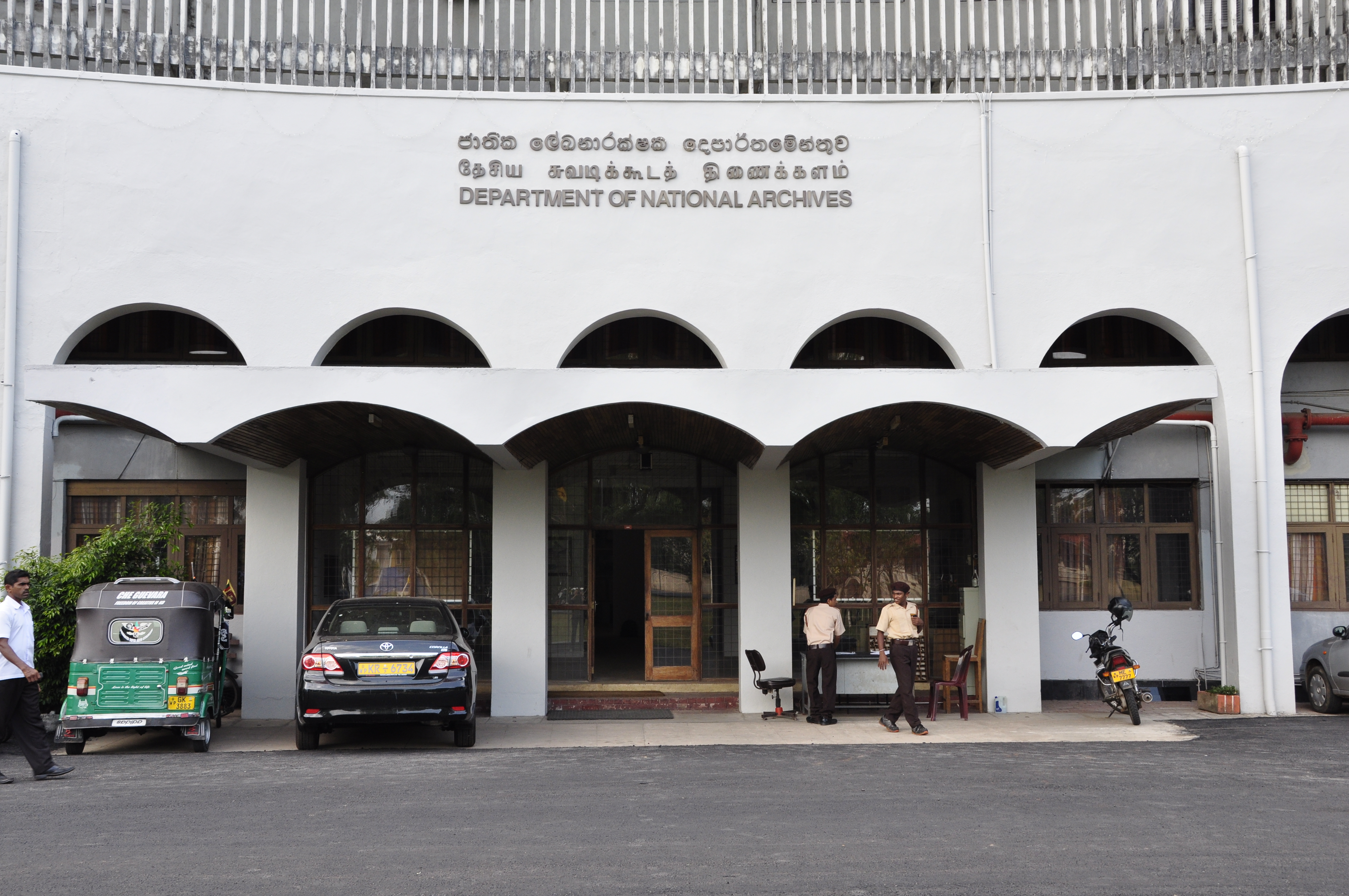
Department of National Archives

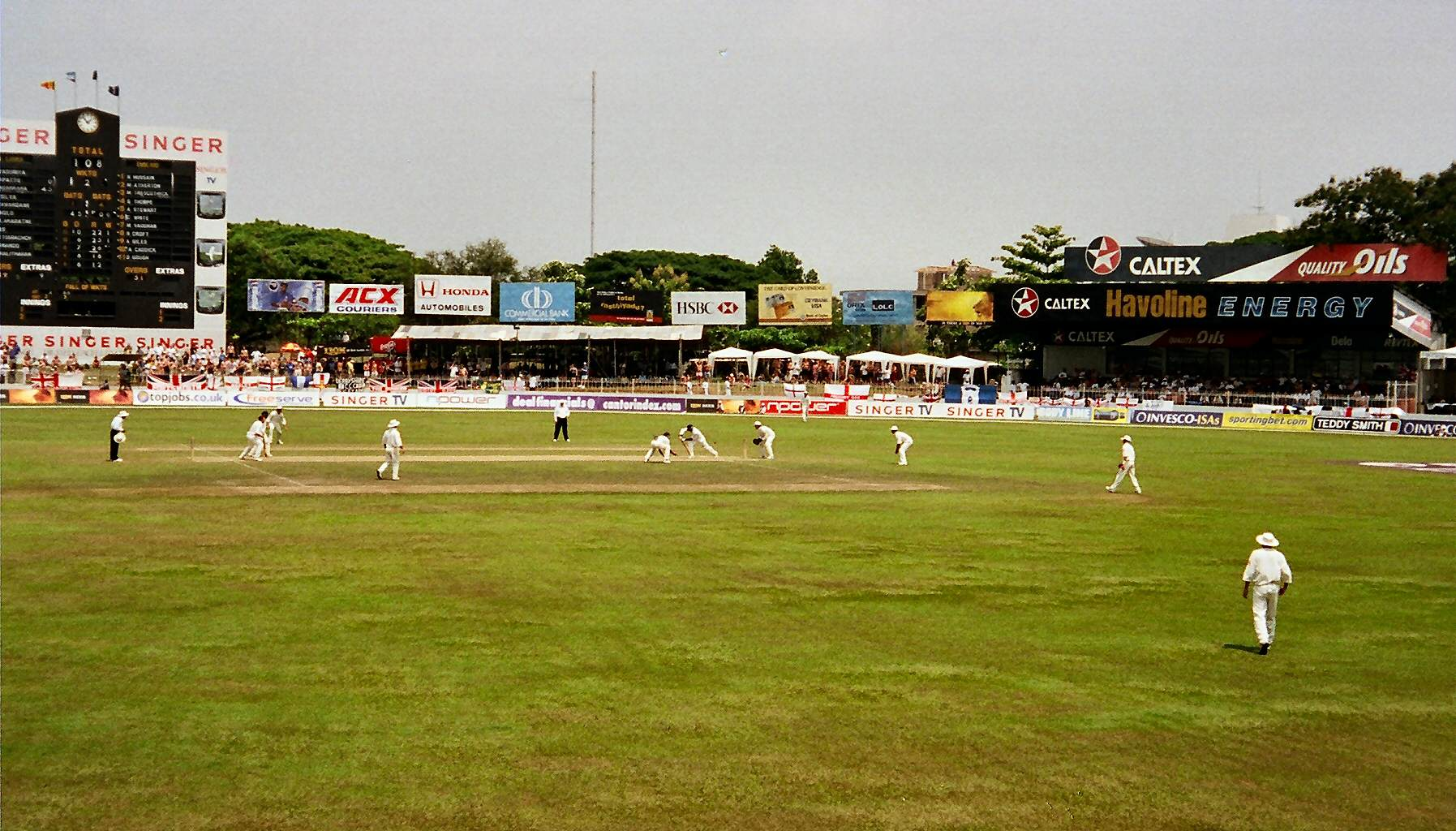
Singhalese Sports Club Cricket Ground

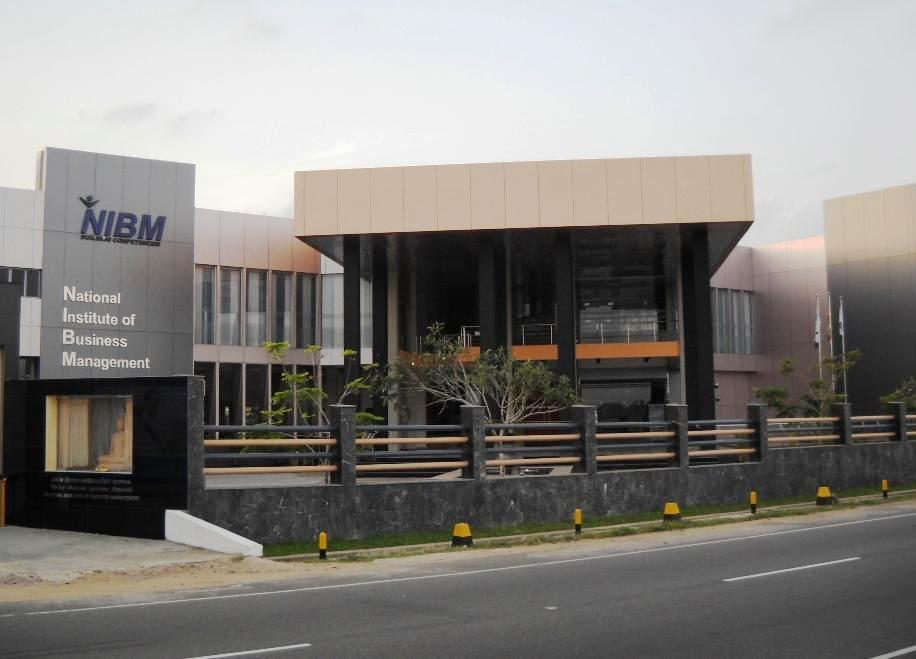
National Institute of Business Management (Sri Lanka)

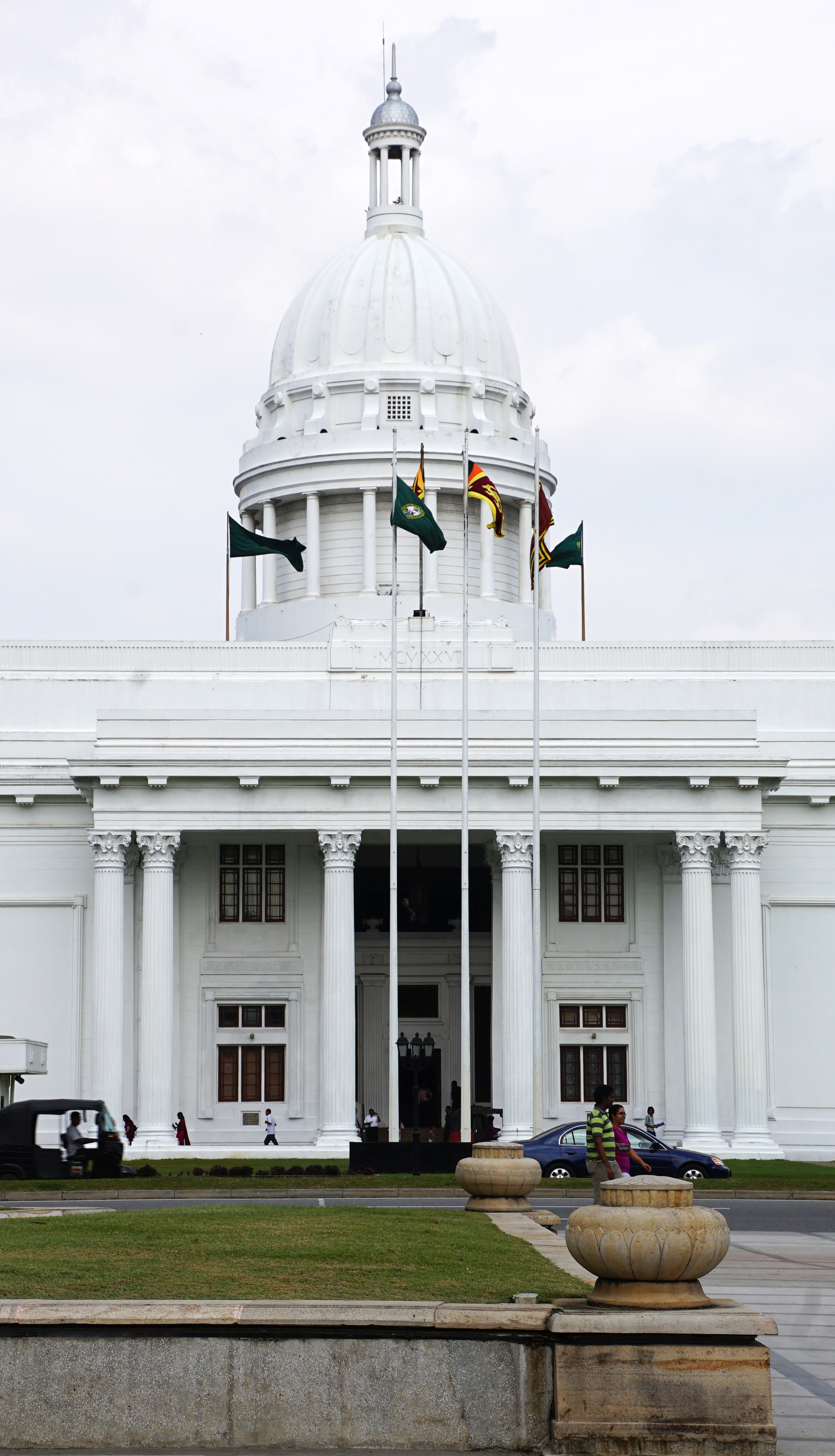
Town Hall, Colombo

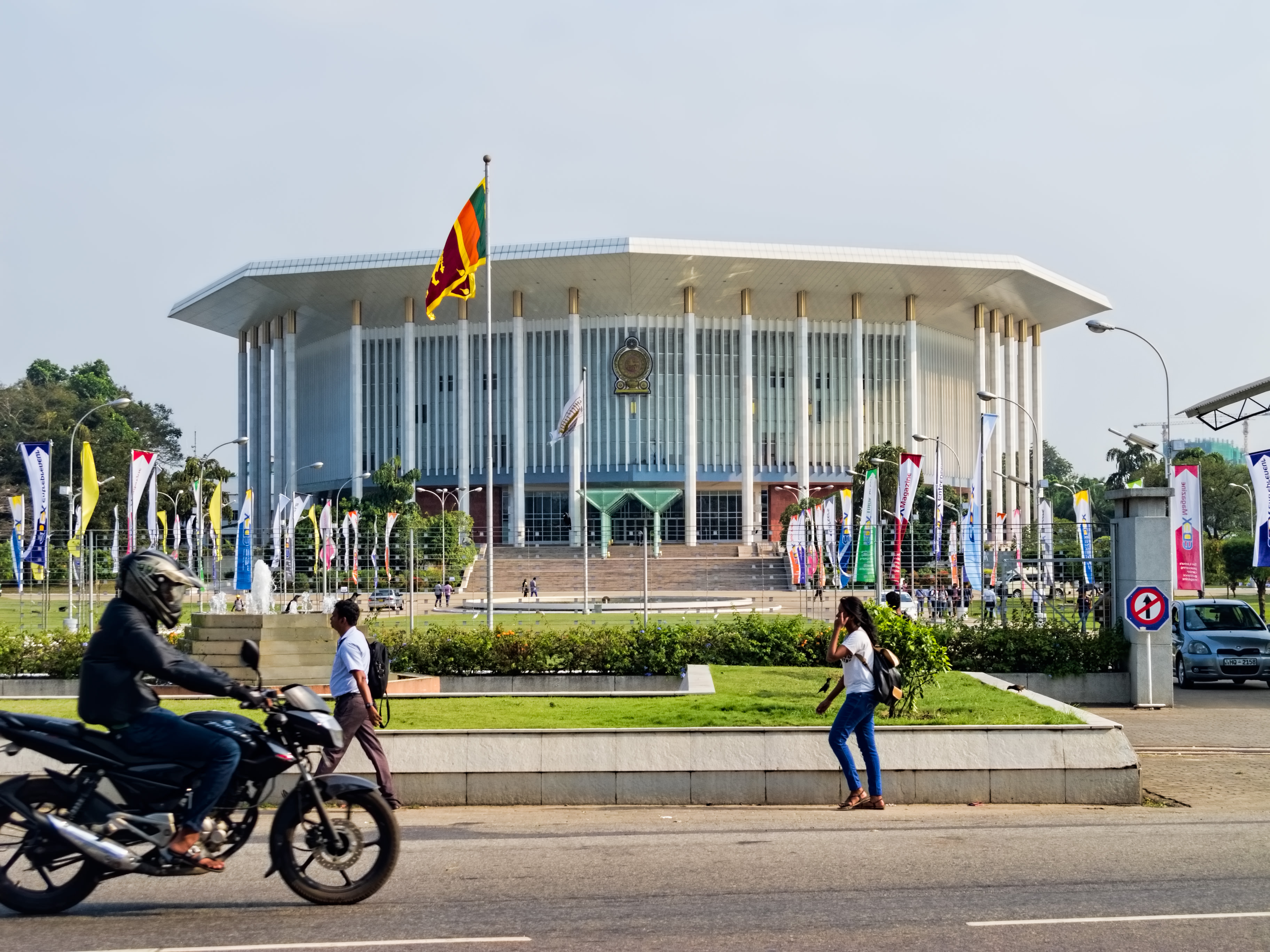
Cinnamon Gardens

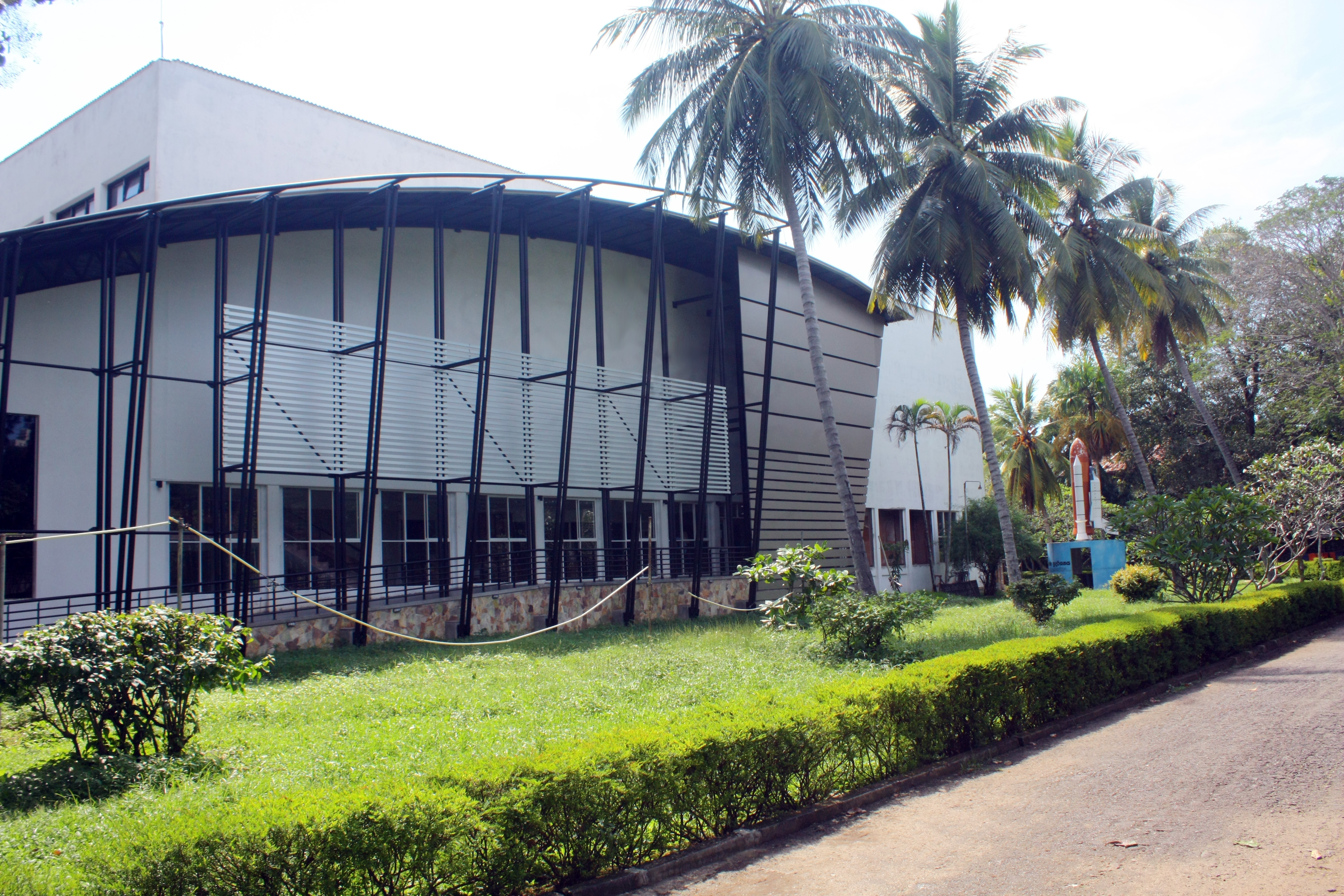
National Museum of Natural History, Colombo

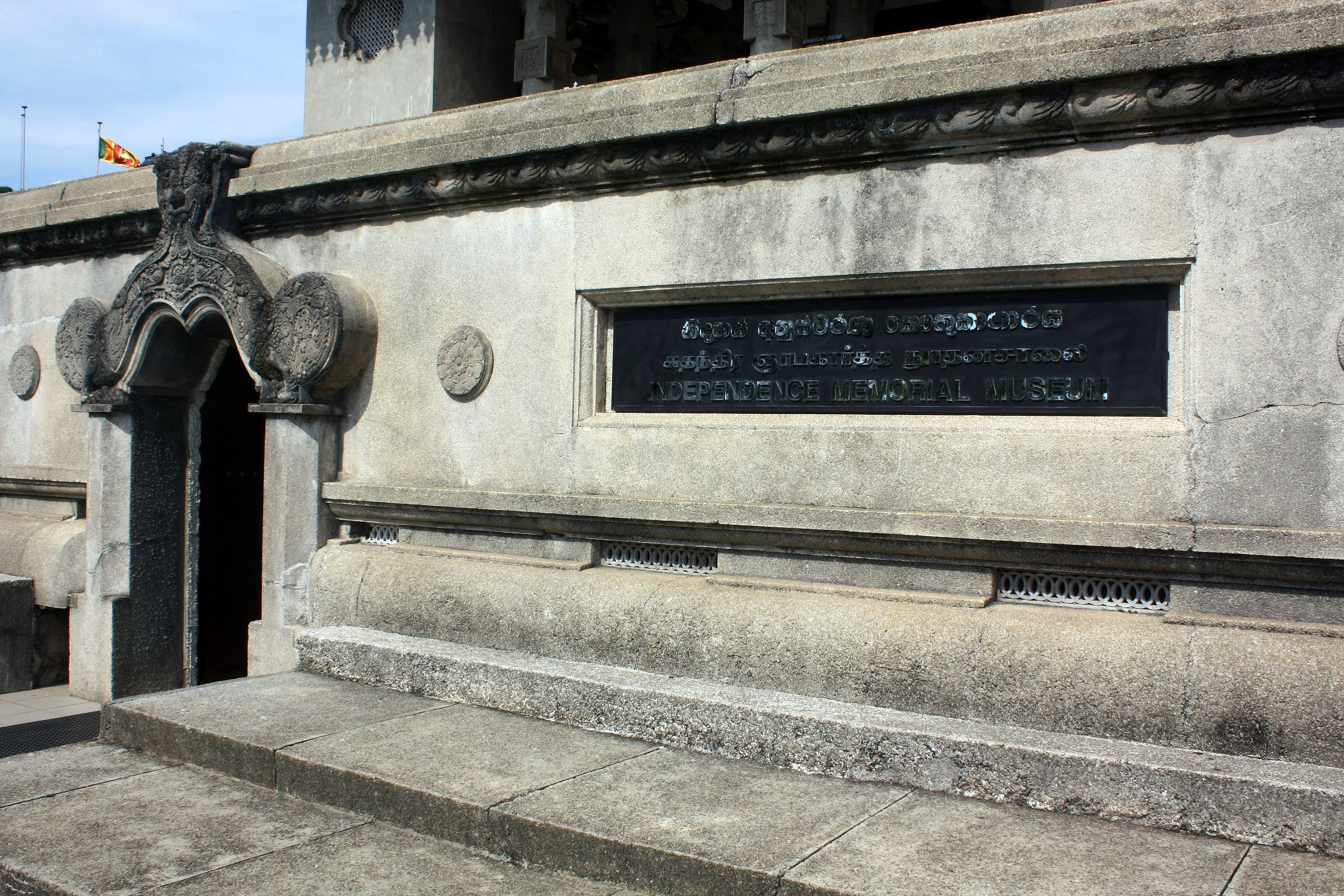
Independence Memorial Museum
