= Frederick Dornhorst =

Ceylonese (Sri Lankan) barrister and King's Advocate

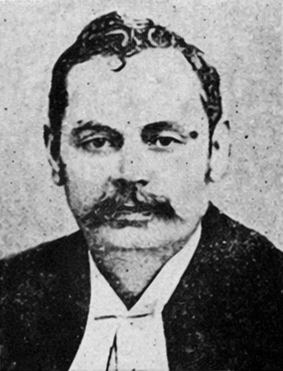
- Born: 26 April 1849; Trincomalee, Ceylon
- Died: 24 April 1927 (aged 77); London, England
- Occupations: Barrister and King's Advocate

Frederick Dornhorst, KC (26 April 1849 – 24 April 1927) was a Ceylonese (Sri Lankan) barrister and King's Advocate.

Educated at Colombo Academy (now Royal College Colombo), Dornhorst became a teacher at the Colombo Academy before moving on to a legal career and becoming a barrister at the Inner Temple. In 1903 he was sworn in as a King's Counsel with Ponnambalam Ramanathan and Thomas De Sampayo, the first "silks" of the Bar of Ceylon.

In 1927, he suffered a broken leg while out walking, and subsequently died of pneumonia while recuperating in a London nursing home.

The Dornhorst Memorial Prize is awarded annually to the most popular student at Royal College Colombo in the memory of Frederick Dornhorst.
