= Nelung Arts Centre =

- Location in central Colombo
- Address: 81 Hyde Park Corner, Colombo 200
- Location: Colombo, Sri Lanka
- Coordinates: 6°55′04″N 79°51′36″E
- Owner: Nelung Arts Foundation
- Operator: Nelung Arts Foundation
- Type: Theatre (Postmodern)
- Events: Music, Concerts, Theatre, Dance

Construction
- Built: 2009
- Opened: 2010; 16 years ago
- Architect: Hiranti Welandawe (H. W. Architects)
- Structural engineer: Nuwan Senaka
- Main contractor: Maga Group

The Nelung Arts Centre is an arts centre in Colombo, Sri Lanka. It opened in September 2010, and houses a dance school, theatre, art gallery and associated offices. Established by the Nelung Arts Foundation, which was founded by Niloufer Pieris, a former Sri Lankan ballerina, and the niece of Harold Peiris. the centre is managed by the Nelung Arts Foundation.

== Design and features ==
The four-storey building was designed by Sri Lankan architect, Hirante Welandawe, as a multi-purpose building, comprising a dance studio, open-air 300 seat theatre and atrium that hosts art exhibitions as well as support facilities such as offices and car parking.

It was built with an eco-friendly approach, which incorporated the use of rainwater harvesting techniques, compressed earth blocks, extensive passive ventilation and natural lighting, innovative structural design that optimised material usage, as well as construction techniques that minimised construction waste.

== See also ==
- Theatre of Sri Lanka
- Lionel Wendt Art Centre
