= Yanjian Group =

Chinese construction and engineering company

- Native name: 烟建集团 (Chinese)
- Company type: Private
- Industry: Engineering Construction; Real Estate Development
- Founded: 1952
- Headquarters: Yanjian Group Co. Ltd - No.100, Nanhong Street, Yantai City, Shandong; Yanjian International Company - 28th Floor, Building 4, Tianhong Kaixuan Cheng, No. 53, Nanshan Road, Zhifu, Yantai, Shandong, Yantai, China
- Area served: Worldwide
- Key people: Tang Bo (Chairman of the Board & President)

Chinese name
- Simplified Chinese: 烟建集团
- Traditional Chinese: 煙建集團
Transcriptions
Standard Mandarin
- Hanyu Pinyin: Yānjiàn Jítuán
- Website: Yanjian Group

Yanjian Group is a Chinese construction and engineering company. It is one of the 250 largest international contractors in 2013 as reported by Engineering News-Record magazine.

Theater constructed by the Yanjian Group in Sri Lanka.

Foreign aid projects sponsored by China are a frequent source of work for the company. The Nelum Pokuna Mahinda Rajapaksa Theatre is a theatre in Colombo, Sri Lanka built in 2011 by China as a gift to enhance ties with Sri Lanka. Construction of the 1288 seat venue was handled by the Yanjian Group. In 2013 in Ghana, it built a six-story building for the Ministry of Foreign Affairs and Regional Integration, funded by a no-interest loan from China. The earlier building on the site had been destroyed by fire.

International contracting for the company is not limited to Chinese aid projects. In 2013, the government of Uganda based on funding from the World Bank contracted 7 Chinese construction companies including Yanjian to renovate hospitals across the country. In the first phase of contracting, Yanjian was allocated responsibility for the Nakaseke hospital in a project worth 12 billion Ugandan shillings.

In addition to contracting work, the company develops real estate. In Brisbane, Australia, it invested in and developed the Midtown Apartments, a 72 million Australian dollar residential tower.
