= Joseph Marsh (priest) =

Joseph Marsh (1803 - 2 February 1838) was a Scottish Anglican priest and educationist. He was the founding headmaster of the Colombo Academy.

Marsh was born in Bonsall, Derbyshire. He gained a MA degree from the University of Edinburgh.

He arrived in Ceylon in 1831 on assignment as the mathematics and classics tutor for the Church Missionary Society from the Diocese of Chennai. Marsh became the acting colonial chaplain at St Paul's Church and joined the tutorial staff of the Cotta Institution which was run by the Church Missionary Society. In 1836, he started a school with 20 students, mainly from the upper class community situated at Hill Street, Pettah, in the back veranda of the church which was called the Hill Street Academy . On request of the parents and based on recommendation from the Colebrooke Commission established the Colombo Academy with the students of the Hill Street Academy and Marsh continuing to serve as headmaster. The Colombo Academy became the first public school in Ceylon.

Marsh also served as the secretary of the Schools Commission and also as secretary of the Friend in Need Society Colombo.

With his health failing in 1838 he left Ceylon and died at sea off the British Cape Colony on 2 February 1838.
