= Barcroft Boake (educator) =

Reverend Barcroft Boake
- Born: 1814; Dublin, Ireland
- Died: 9 September 1876 (aged 61–62); Melbourne, Victoria, Australia
- Education: Trinity College Dublin
- Occupations: Educator and clergyman
- Spouse(s): Mary Catherine Slade (m.1843), Agnes Jane March (m.1861)
- Parent(s): John Fuller Boake (father), Mary née Lodge (mother)

Dr Barcroft Boake (1814 - 9 September 1876) was an Irish born clergyman and educator, who was the longest serving principal of Royal College Colombo, from 1842 to 1870.

Barcroft Boake was born in Dublin, Ireland in 1814, the only son of John Fuller Boake (1792-1865), a brick merchant, and Mary née Lodge.

In 1828, at the age of 14, he entered Trinity College Dublin, and in 1836 received a Bachelor of Arts. He subsequently obtained granted a Master of Arts, Bachelor of Divinity and Doctorate of Divinity.

Boake was ordained as a deacon by the Bishop of Cork, Samuel Kyle, in 1838 and as a priest in 1839.

In 1841 the Church Missionary Society proposed to establish a new school in southern India and offered Boake the position of headmaster. The scheme however broke down and the Society recommended to the Secretary of State that he be offered the position of principal of the Colombo Academy, a state school operated by the government. He accepted and sailed to Ceylon in September 1842.

In October 1842 Boake took up the role as the principal of Colombo Academy and he remained at that post until September 1870. In 1859 he helped establish the Queen's College, the first institution of higher education in Ceylon. The college was affiliated with Calcutta University, and prepared students from the Colombo Academy for entrance examinations to English universities. In 1865 the Morgan Committee, a committee of the Legislative Council of Ceylon, conducted an inquiry into education, recommending that it be reorganised and that scholarships should be awarded to study at the University of Oxford. As a result, in 1869, Queen's College was amalgamated with the Colombo Academy.

In 1868 he set up a hostel at the Colombo Academy, in San Sebastian, establishing it as one of the first boarding schools in Ceylon.

Boake also served as acting colonial chaplain and rector of Trinity Church, Colombo. On 23 March 1843 he married Mary Catherine Slade (1818-1860), the eldest daughter of Major General William Henry Slade (1787-1874) of the Royal Engineers and Mary née Holden, in Colombo, and they had eight children, including: William John Slade (1867-1889), the Police Magistrate Kalpitiya and Assistant Government Agent in various districts in the island; Mary Catherine; Emily and Fanny Lousia. Following Catherine's death on 17 January 1860, Boake married a second time, on 27 August 1861, to Agnes Jane Marsh (the daughter of Reverend Joseph Marsh, the first headmaster of the Colombo Academy), to whom he had a further five children, including: Alfred Hogarth; and Walter Hovenden.

Boake wrote several treatises which were published by the Ceylon Times in 1853 and 1854. He also had a sermon published by the Church Mission Press, Cotta 1857 which was preached at Trinity Church, Colombo on 1 June 1851.

After his retirement Boake and his family migrated to Melbourne, Australia on 26 October 1870 and served as the pastor of the Holy Trinity Church in Saint Kilda. He died in Melbourne, Victoria on 9 September 1876.
