= Lionel Wendt Art Centre =

- ලයනල් වෙන්ඩ්ට්
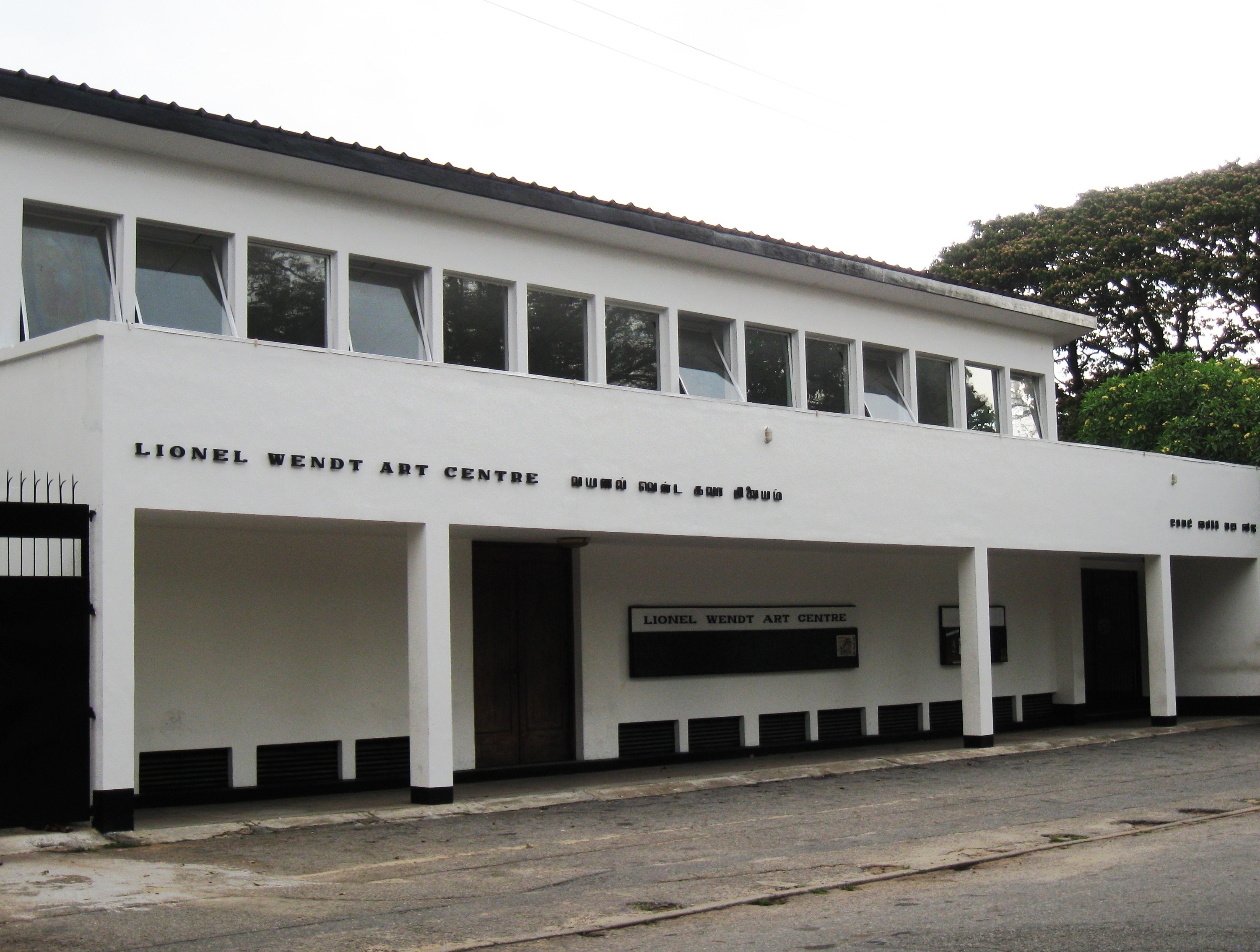
- Lionel Wendt Art Centre

- Location in greater Colombo
- Full name: Lionel Wendt Centre for the Arts
- Address: 18 Premasiri Khemadasa Mawatha; Colombo; Sri Lanka
- Location: Colombo, Sri Lanka
- Coordinates: 6°54′25″N 79°51′37″E
- Owner: Lionel Wendt Memorial Fund (LWMF)
- Capacity: Over 600
- Type: Theatre & Gallery
- Events: Art, Music, Concerts, Theatre, Dance

Construction
- Opened: 12 December 1953

Website
- lionelwendt.org

The Lionel Wendt Art Centre is a major art centre and theatre in Colombo, Sri Lanka, dedicated to the memory of Sri Lankan photographic artist Lionel Wendt. It combines live theatre and art exhibition, with two exhibition galleries and two theatres. It is managed by a trust established by an Act of Parliament.

== History ==
Early art exhibitions were held at Wendt's home, with the second and third taking place after Lionel Wendt's death in 1944. After his death, his brother Harry decided to open a centre in his brother's memory, but he died just a year after his brother. The construction of the centre was finished by their mutual friend, Harold Peiris, for whom one of the Centre's second galleries is named.

The theatre portion of the centre opened on 12 December 1953, with the production of Maxim Gorky's "The Lower Depths", starring Iranganie Serasinghe and produced by E. F. C. Ludowyk. Performances in subsequent years included Ediriweera Sarachchandra's "Maname" (1956) and Chitrasena's "Karadiya" (1961).

== Board of Trustees ==
Original

- Harold Peiris (sole life-trustee)
- Stanley de Saram
- Trevor de Saram
- James Naidoo
- Dr. Paul E. Pieris
- B. G. Thornley
- L. C. van Geyzel

Current

- Ranil Pieris (Chairman)
- Ayomi Aluwihare
- Thivanka Jayasinghe
- Arosha Perera
- Jerome L. De Silva
- Angeline Ondaatjie
- Azira Esufally

== Centre facilities ==
- Lionel Wendt Gallery (Ground floor)
- Harold Peiris Gallery (Upper floor)
- Lionel Wendt Theatre (621 seats)

== See also ==
- Nelung Arts Centre
- Theatre of Sri Lanka
- Nelum Pokuna Performing Arts Theatre
- National Art Gallery, Sri Lanka
