= Nelum Pokuna Mahinda Rajapaksa Theatre =

Performing arts centre in Colombo, Sri Lanka

- නෙළුම් පොකුණ මහින්ද රාජපක්ෂ රඟහල

- Location in greater Colombo
- Former names: National Performing Arts Theatre
- Address: Ananda Coomaraswamy Mawatha, Colombo 07, Sri Lanka
- Location: Colombo, Sri Lanka
- Coordinates: 6°54′39″N 79°51′48″E
- Owner: Government of Sri Lanka
- Capacity: 1269
- Type: Theatre
- Events: Music, concerts, theatre, dance, international conferences
- Parking: 500 spaces

Construction
- Built: 2006–2011
- Opened: 15 December 2011
- Architects: Kahawita De Silva & Associates
- Structural engineer: Yanjian Group

Website
- www.nelumpokuna.com

The Nelum Pokuna Theatre (Sinhala: නෙළුම් පොකුණ මහින්ද රාජපක්ෂ රඟහල, Nelum Pokuna Râjapaksa Ranggahala; often known as Nelum Pokuna; previously the National Performing Arts Theatre, prior to naming at the opening ceremony after which the President Mahinda Rajapaksa named it after himself) is a performing arts centre in Colombo, Sri Lanka. The theatre opened on 15 December 2011.

== Design and features ==
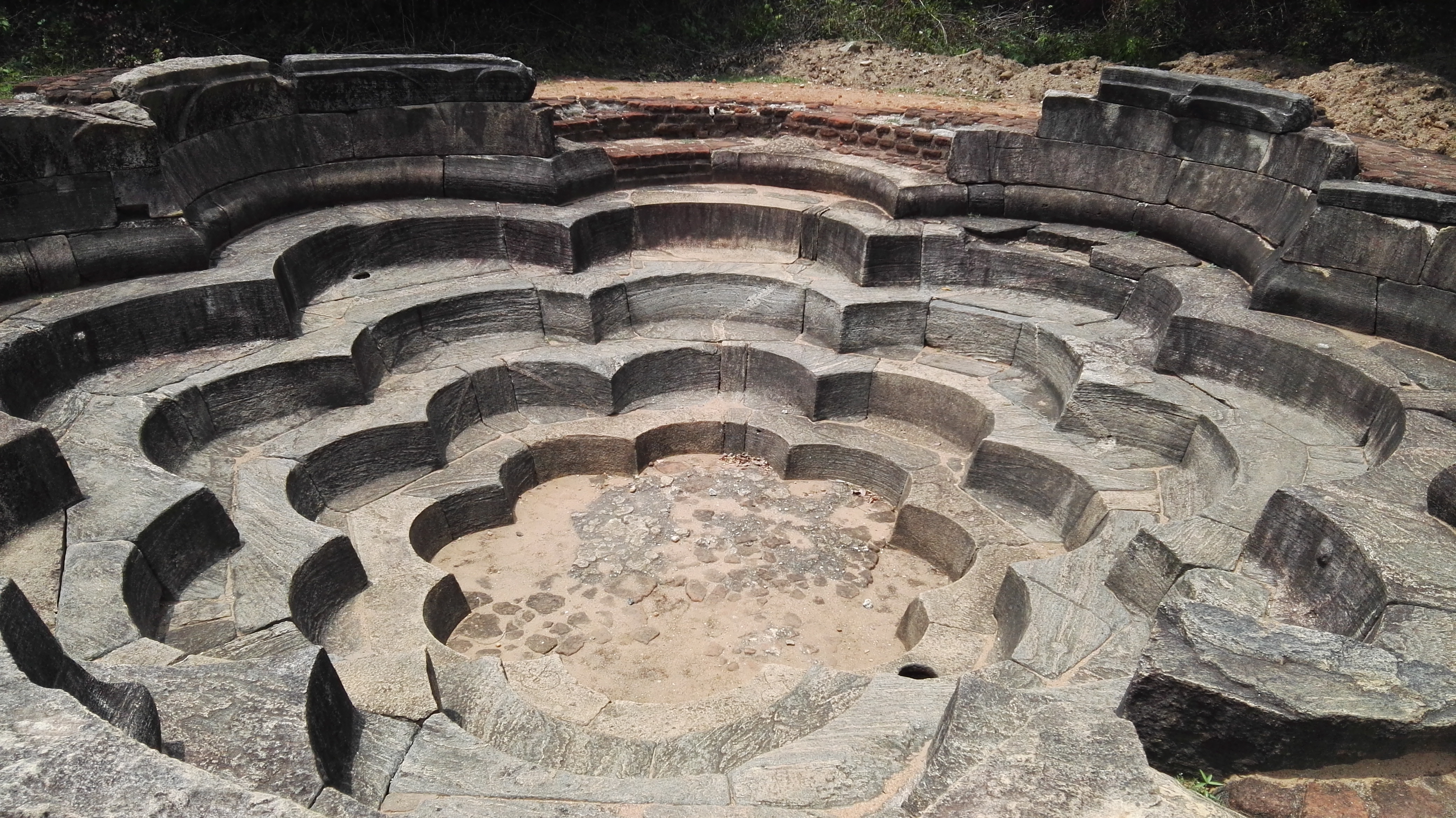
Nelum Pokuna, Polonnaruwa

The architecture of the theatre is inspired by the 12th century Nelum Pokuna (lotus pond) in Polonnaruwa.

The total estimated cost of the project is LKR 3,080 million. Government of the People's Republic of China provided LKR 2430 million out of the total cost of the building.

The building spreads over 14,000 m^{2} (150,000 sq ft) of floor area.

The theatre is equipped with an auditorium with 1,288 seats, a library, and training facilities. The building features two permanent theatres—the main auditorium and an open-air theatre—and the ability to convert the front steps into an additional open-air theatre.

The 690 m^{2} (7,400 sq ft) moving stage in the auditorium includes the ability to raise and lower the orchestra pit to and from stage level. There are facilities to conduct educational and research activities. Parking for 500 vehicles is also available.

== Building history ==
In 2005 China expressed willingness to construct a cultural theatre in Colombo, in memory of President Chandrika Kumaratunga's late husband Vijaya Kumaratunga who was a popular actor. The foundation stone was laid to the project by her. The National Performing Arts Theatre's construction began in 2006 and took four years to build. The theatre's construction was completed around early 2011 and it was opened in December 2011. It was ceremonially opened by Sri Lankan President Mahinda Rajapakse and China's Vice President of the Chinese Republican Committee, Sang Chiang.

During the opening the Ananda Coomaraswamy Mawatha was renamed to Nelum Pokuna Mawatha, later reverted to Ananda Coomaraswamy Mawatha.

== Notable shows, productions, and events ==
The Nelum Pokuna Theatre has shows, productions, and other bookings scheduled through September 2012.

For opening night, an opera was produced by leading Sri Lanka artistes, such as Jayantha Chandrasiri, Rohana Weerasinghe and Channa Wijewardena, starting with a rendition of Jagan Mohini Madura Bashini by Pandith Amaradeva. A Chinese opera was also produced upon opening. The Chinese opera depicted the story of fourth-century Chinese-Buddhist monk Fa-Hsien's travels to Sri Lanka. Both performances employed the Seda Mawatha concept, incorporating both film and drama.

In November 2013, the Theatre hosted its first symphony orchestra concert, by the Commonwealth Festival Orchestra, with 87 musicians from the UK, India and the Symphony Orchestra of Sri Lanka, conducted by James Ross.

The venue was initially chosen to host the ABU Radio Song Festival 2014 on 23 May 2014, but was later moved to the Stein Studios, in Colombo.

The Nelum Pokuna Theatre was the site of the opening ceremony of the 2013 Commonwealth Heads of Government Meeting.

== Gallery ==
Theatre

Facade

Facade detail

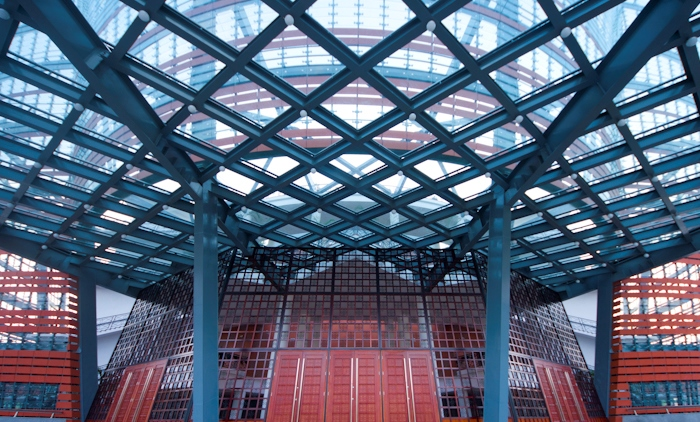
Entrance

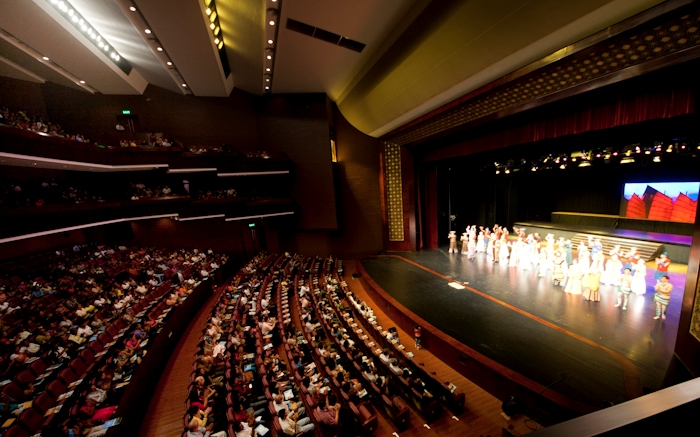
Auditorium

== See also ==
- Malalasekara Theater
- Theatre of Sri Lanka
- Lionel Wendt Art Centre
- Navarangahala
