= Royal College, Colombo =

Public school in Colombo, Sri Lanka

Royal College
- රාජකීය විද්‍යාලය; ரோயல் கல்லூரி

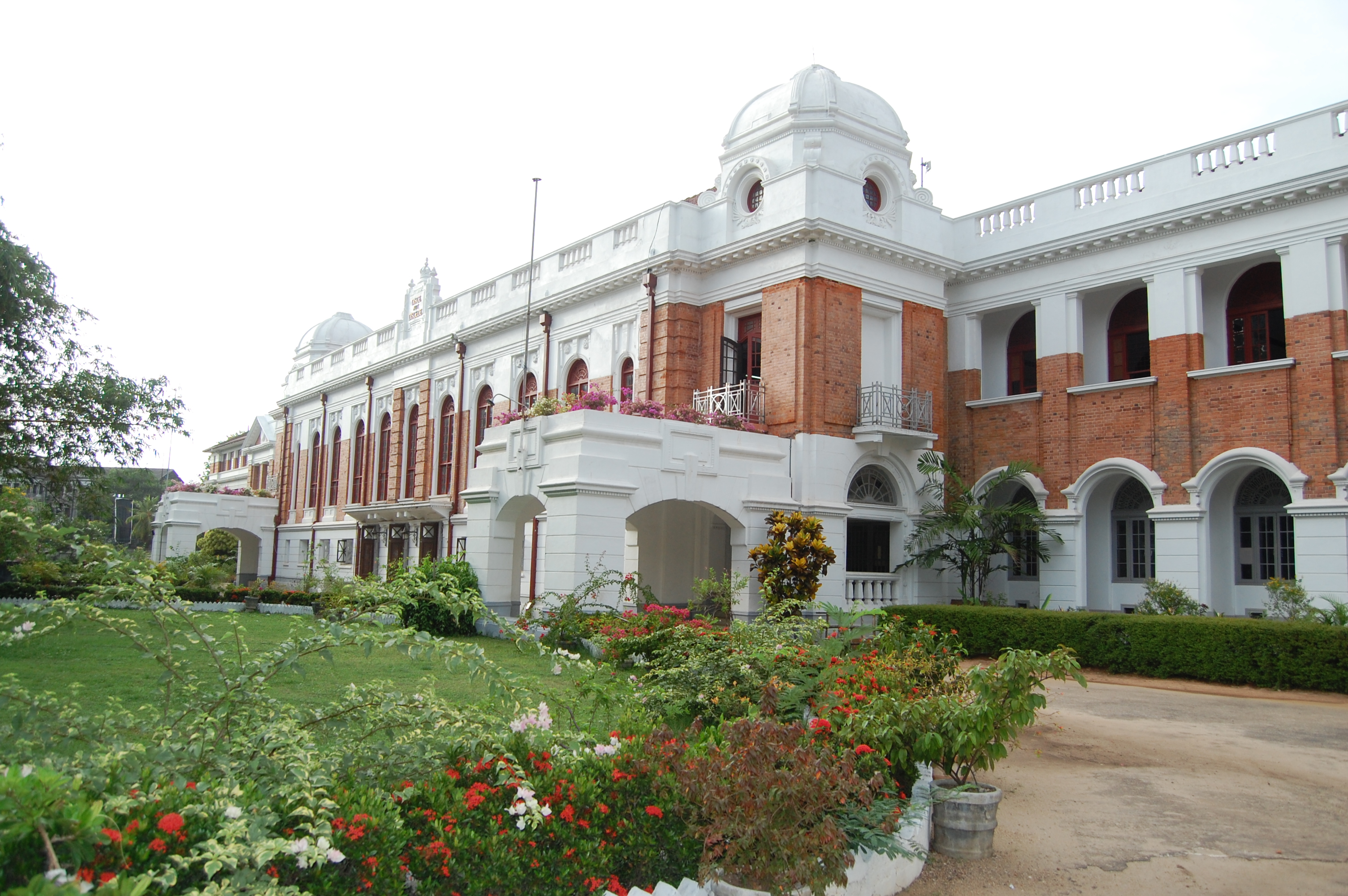
- Royal College main building

Location
- Rajakeeya Mawatha; Colombo, 00700; Sri Lanka; 6°54′18″N 79°51′41″E

Information
- Former name: Colombo Academy; Hill Street Academy
- School type: National school
- Motto: Floreat (Flourish); Disce aut discede (Learn or depart)
- Religious affiliation: Secular
- Established: January 1835; 191 years ago
- Founder: Joseph Marsh; Robert Wilmot-Horton
- Authority: Ministry of Education
- Principal: Athula Wijewardena
- Staff: 200
- Faculty: 600
- Grades: 1–13
- Gender: Male
- Age range: 6–19
- Enrollment: 9500
- Education system: National Education System
- Language: English; Sinhala; Tamil
- Hours in school day: 07:10–13:10 SLST
- Houses: Boake; Hartley; Harward; Marsh; Reed
- Colours: Navy blue and royal gold
- Song: School of our Fathers
- Publication: Royal College Magazine; The Royalist
- Alumni: Old Royalists
- Website: royalcollege.lk
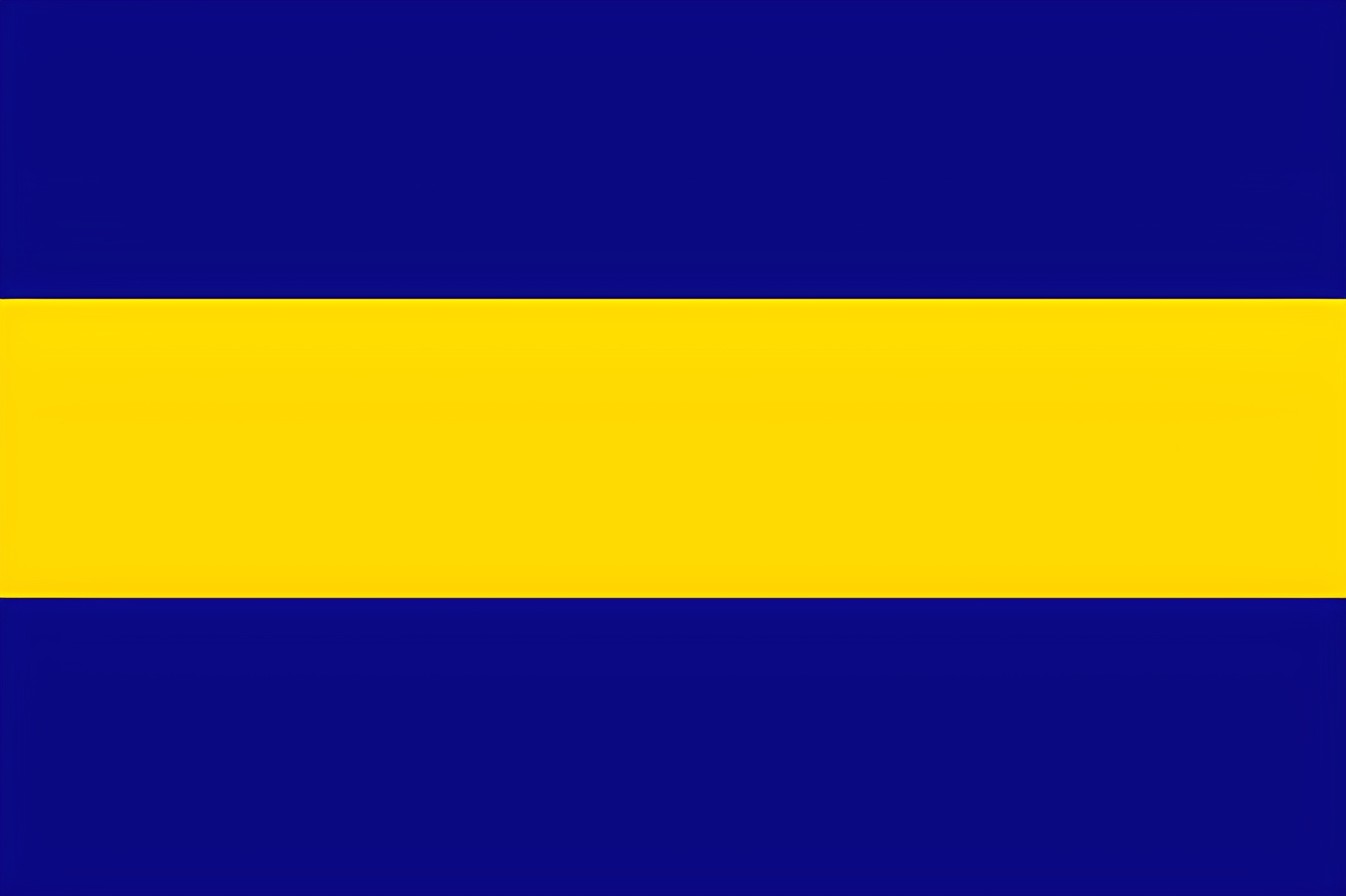
- Flag of Royal College

Royal College, Colombo also known as; Royal Colombo, Colombo Royal College or Colombo Royal is a boys' school located in Cinnamon Gardens, Colombo, Sri Lanka. Started by Joseph Marsh in 1835, it was established as the Colombo Academy by Sir Robert Wilmot-Horton in January 1835, as part of the implementation of the recommendations of the Colebrooke–Cameron Commission (1833), and was the first government-run secondary school for boys in the country.

Royal College is the first public school in Sri Lanka and is often referred to as the "Eton of Sri Lanka". The school was founded in the British public school tradition, based on the recommendations of the Colebrooke–Cameron Commission (1833), and having been named the Royal College, Colombo in 1881 with consent from Queen Victoria. It became the first school to gain the prefix "Royal" outside of the British Isles. It was one of the first schools to be designated as a national school by the Sri Lankan Government in the 1980s.

As a national school, it is funded by the government as opposed to the provincial council providing both primary and secondary education. The school was recognised as one of the most innovative educational institutions in the world at the fifth annual Worldwide Innovative Education Forum (IEF), organised by the Microsoft Corporation in 2009.

The students of Royal College are known as Royalists or referred to in the press as Colombo Royalists. whilst past pupils are known as Old Royalists. The school has produced many distinguished alumni, among whom are presidents of two countries, a sultan, and four prime ministers.

== College ==
=== Location ===
Situated in Cinnamon Gardens belonging to Kurunduwatta (also called Kurundu Watta), a residential suburb of Colombo, it occupies an area of 15.6 hectares (39 acres) (with the sports complex) along the Rajakeeya Mawatha, bordered by Reid Avenue to the east; Kumarathunga Munidasa Mawatha (formally Thurstan Road) to the west and to the south its former premises, which now houses the Department of Mathematics of the University of Colombo. Adjacent to Royal College is Thurstan College (formerly the Government Senior School), which was established to accommodate the overflow of students from Royal Primary who could not gain admission to Royal College.

=== Administration ===
The college is funded by the Ministry of Education, which appoints its principal. The principal is the head of the administration of the college and is assisted by a Senior Deputy Principal. The school is divided into four sections: the primary school (the former Royal College Preparatory School), middle school, upper-middle school and the upper school, each coming under a deputy principal (the head of the primary school is known as the headmaster/headmistress). The college educates close to 9,000 students in both secondary and primary education. The administration of the college hostel is carried out by the warden under the supervision of the principal and is assisted by a sub-warden.

=== Admission ===
Admission to the school is among the most competitive in the country. It gets its highest number of applications for admission to grade 1 and the best 250 students from all over the country to enter the school in year 5 via the grade 5 scholarship examination.

=== Grounds ===
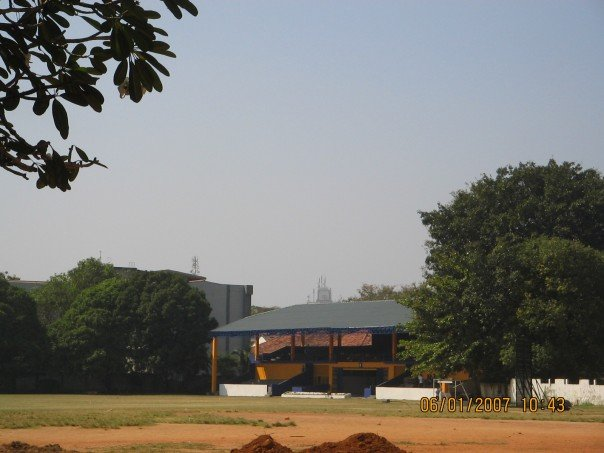
The J.R. Jayawardene Pavilion at the main cricket grounds.

The school is located on 15.5 hectares (38 acres) where the primary school, the middle school and the upper school are located. It is equipped with lecture halls, science and computer laboratories, and auditoriums. This includes the College Hall and the Navarangahala, a national theatre. The school hostel is located within the school grounds and it accommodates students from outside Colombo, with around 230 hostelers.

Sport plays a major part in Royal College's activities. The school's facilities include a swimming pool, cricket and athletics grounds, tennis courts, basketball courts, and indoor cricket nets within the school premises. The Royal College Sports Complex and the rugby grounds are located a short distance from the college. The international standard sports complex, built in 2000, hosts national and school sporting events all year round.

=== War memorial ===
Situated in front of the main building, next to the main Boake Gates, is the memorial to Old Royalists who died in the two World Wars and the Sri Lankan Civil War.

Another memorial plaque is displayed in the entryway to the Navarangahala, bearing the names of 47 Old Royalists who were killed in action in the civil war. The first War Memorial Panel of the college was unveiled in the second term of 1933, by Sir Graeme Tyrrell, Chief Secretary of Ceylon commemorating Old Royalists who had died or were decorated during the Great War. Of the 330 Ceylonese who volunteered for service in the Great War, 88 were from Royal College.

== History ==
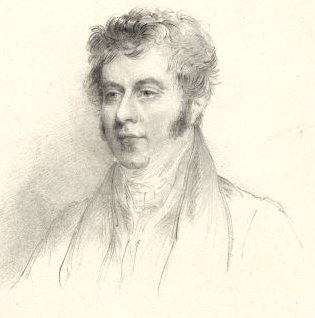
Founder Sir Robert Wilmot-Horton, the Governor of Ceylon

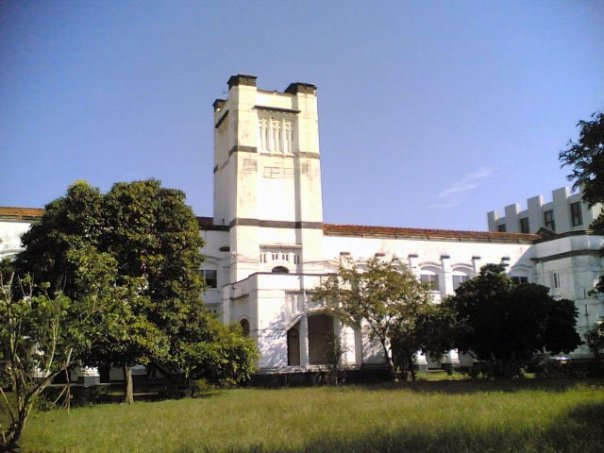
Old College Building (1911–1921), now the University of Colombo

In 1835, Joseph Marsh started a private school at the back verandah of the church called the Hill Street Academy for twenty students from the upper class community situated at Hill Street, Pettah.

Then in the following year in 1836, Sir Robert Wilmot-Horton, the British Governor of Ceylon, based on the recommendations of the Colebrooke Commission, established the Colombo Academy, as an English public school modeled on Eton College, with Marsh continuing as headmaster on government pay. It was the oldest public school on the island and had the governor as its patron. It gave the children of leading Ceylonese families an education which would make them fit to be citizens of the British Empire and served as the principal public school and a model for other government schools that were to be built in Ceylon. In 1836 the school was moved to San Sebastian Hill, Pettah, (prior to which it was at Maradana, next to Hulftsdorp); it would stay there for another 75 years before being shifted to Thurstan Road. Even though the college had close ties to Anglicanism in its early years since 1836 it has remained a secular school.

In 1859 the Queen's College, Colombo was established as the first institution of higher education in Ceylon. Affiliated to the University of Calcutta, it prepared students from the Colombo Academy for entrance examinations of English universities. In 1865 the Morgan Committee of inquiry into education recommended that it be reorganized and that scholarships should be awarded to study at the University of Oxford, and as a result in 1869, Queen's College was amalgamated with the Colombo Academy.

The first hostel of the Colombo Academy was established in San Sebastian in 1868, establishing it as one of the first boarding schools in Ceylon.

In 1881 it was renamed Royal College Colombo with the royal consent of Queen Victoria. The Gazette notification giving Her Majesty's approval to change the name of the school appeared on 31 July 1881. The same year the first cadet battalion in Ceylon was formed at the college, attached to the Ceylon Light Infantry. The Royal College Union was formed in 1891 as the first alumni society in the country.

In 1911, work commenced on a new building for the school on Reid Avenue. In November 1911 during construction of this building, it was hit by an aircraft that was trying the establish the record for the first flight over Ceylon in November 1911. On 27 August 1913 the school was moved to thin new building at Reid Avenue (which is now the main building of the University of Colombo). Ten years later on 10 October 1923, the school moved, this time to the newly constructed Victorian styled building further down Reid Avenue, which it continues to occupy. This move was due to the suggestion made by a higher education committee in 1914, that Royal College should be converted into a University college. Due to the objections made by past pupils of the Royal College Union, especially by the speeches made by Frederick Dornhorst, KC, the then Governor of Ceylon, Lord Chalmers instead created a separate University College, University College Colombo, at the school's former premises which became the University of Colombo in the later years.

With the introduction of free education in Ceylon in 1931, Royal stopped charging fees from its students, thus providing education free of charge to this day.

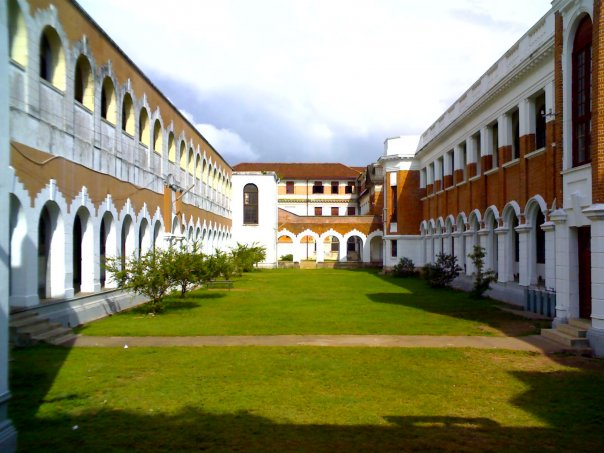
The Quadrangle.

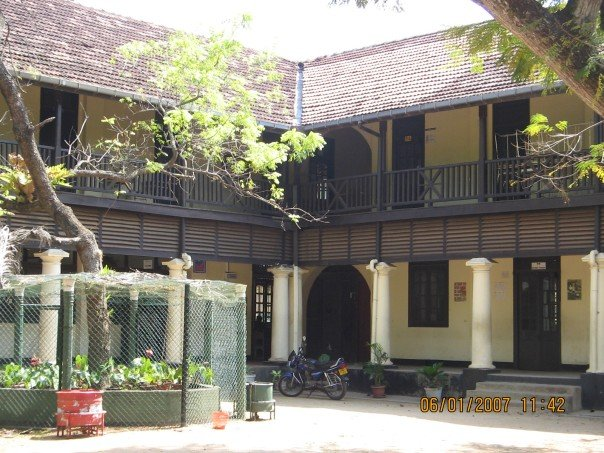
The oldest building in school, the former hostel now houses the Grade 8 section.

In 1940 the school was again on the move this time due to the onset of World War II. The school was ordered to move out and the British Army moved in, establishing the Combined Military Hospital, Colombo in the school buildings by 1941 and later covering it into a garrison. Principal E.L. Bradby made sure that education was carried on unhindered by moving the students into four private villas (known as bungalows in Ceylon) at Turret Street, Colombo: the Turret House, Carlton Lodge, Sudarshan House and Firdoshi House.

In 1942 forms 1–3 were relocated to Glendale bungalow (currently part of Bandarawela Central College) in Bandarawela, 200 km (120 mi) from Colombo. In 1944 the Royal Preparatory School was moved to Bandarawela due to the risk of Japanese aerial bombings. In 1948, following the end of World War II, both were moved back to Colombo.

Following a decree from the State Council of Ceylon in 1945, religious studies were started at the school.

In 1948, after the war ended, the school was relocated to its old home on Reid Avenue, Colombo, and the Hill School was closed down.

In August 1977, the Royal Preparatory School was amalgamated into Royal College forming the school's primary school. With it came the country's only national theatre at the time, the Navarangahala.

Five years earlier on 22 May 1972, the members of the House of Representatives of the Dominion of Ceylon met at the Royal Primary School Hall (Navarangahala) and enacted the Republican Constitution that established the Republic of Sri Lanka.

Since its establishment, the main medium of education had been English; however with Sinhala becoming the official language along with Tamil, the medium of education was changed to Sinhala and Tamil. In 2002 English was reintroduced as a medium of education at the college. Students may select one of the three languages in which to conduct their studies.

== School traditions ==
The college's motto is Disce aut Discede, meaning "learn or depart" in Latin. The motto is associated with the high academic standard maintained at the school for over 180 years. The first mentions of the motto appeared during the tenure of principal George Todd (1871–1878). "Floreat", meaning "flourish" in Latin, has been a motto associated with the school since the founding of the Colombo Academy in 1836. It is derived from "Floreat Etona", the motto of Eton College on which the academy was modeled on at its formation.

=== College song ===
The college song is "School of our Fathers". It is sung at the start of every school day except for Monday, when the National Anthem is sung, and on other important occasions. The words of the song were written by Major H. L. Reed, a principal of the school in the third term of 1927. The music was later revised by S. Schmid. It was first performed on 13 July 1928, the same year Royal College Colombo won the Meaden Shield in the schools singing competition for the eighth year in succession. "School of our Fathers" was presented at the competition.

A shorter Sinhala version of the college song was composed in 1968 on the request of the principal, W. A. Wickramasena and S. J. F. Dissanayake, who were masters of the school and had been part of the combination which composed the first song. It is played at the end of the school day.

=== Prefectorial system ===
In addition to the teachers, four categories of senior boys are entitled to maintain school discipline. Boys who belong to the most senior category of student leaders prefects wear a silver college crest on their all-white uniform.

- Senior Prefect: A senior prefect is a member of the most senior prefectorial group of Royal College: The Prefects' Council. Selected based on the criteria of academics, co-curricular and extra-curricular, senior prefects are appointed on a probationary basis after completing the final exams at school (GCE Advanced Level). Of these, only a handful are appointed as Senior Prefects. Since they have completed their final examinations, they are senior to any other student of the college. Hence their disciplinary powers extend to all students of Royal College. And they effectively stay another year at school, monitoring and supporting all its academic, co-curricular and extracurricular activities in general. From amongst the Senior Prefects are chosen the Head Prefect to lead all prefects of the college, and the Prefects' Top Board, which consists of the Head Prefect (HP), the Senior Deputy Head Prefect (SDHP) and five Deputy Head Prefects (DHPs). Notable head prefects include: J. R. Jayewardene, Sepala Attygalle, Ranjan Madugalle and Neville Kanakeratne.
- Steward: selected from students in grade 12(senior) and After O/L period(junior), they assist the senior prefects to exercise discipline in Upper School (grades 10, 11).
- Junior Prefect: selected from students in grade 9 (grade 8, until 1998), their disciplinary powers are limited to the students of the Middle School (grades 6–9).
- Primary Prefect: selected from students in grade 5, their disciplinary powers are limited to the students of the Primary School (grades 1–5).

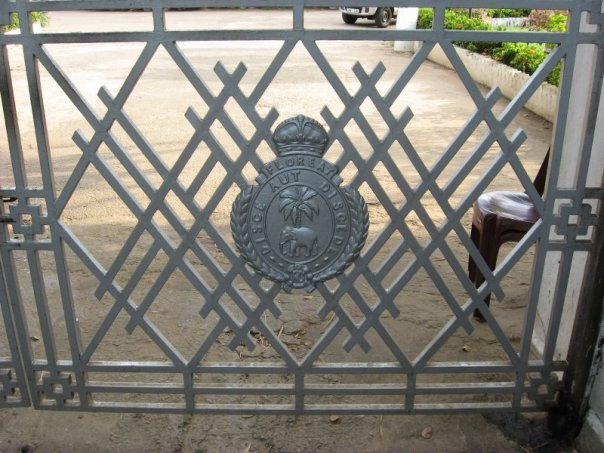
One of the Boake Gates, adorned with the pre-1954 crest with the Tudor Crown.

== Awards ==
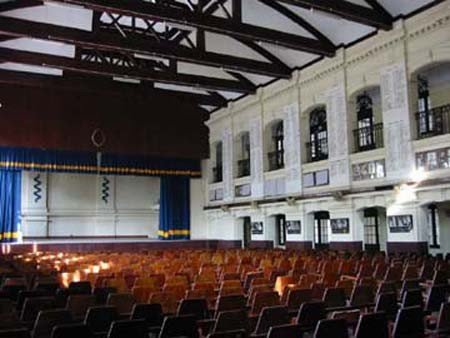
Interior of the Royal College Main Hall, listing the Panel Prizes on its walls.

There are 165 endowed prizes and awards. The College Main Hall carries the names of those students who have won the Panel Prizes. The most coveted prize at Royal is the Dornhorst Memorial Prize, awarded (since 1930) to the most popular student each year on the basis of votes, in memory of Frederick Dornhorst, KC, followed by the Lalith Athulathmudali Memorial Prize for the most outstanding Royalist of the year. The celebrated Turnour Prize, in memory of George Turnour, is the oldest of the panel prizes. First awarded in 1846 to C. A. Lorensz, it is given annually to the best student in performance in academics. In 1876 another panel prize, the Lorensz Scholarship, was established. It is awarded annually to the best all-rounder with the best in performance in academics and sports.

These prizes are awarded at the prize-giving under the patronage of the President of Sri Lanka (earlier under the patronage of the Governor of Ceylon).

The Royal Crown, the most prestigious award a sportsman can achieve at Royal, is awarded each year at Colours Night to a sportsman who has made outstanding achievements in his field of sports. Colours are awarded to other players who have made significant contributions in the sporting arena.

=== Scholarship and prizes ===
| Prize | Year of Institution |
| Turnour Prize | 1846– |
| Senior Mathematical Prize | 1846–1934 |
| Shakespeare Prize | 1870–1932 |
| English University Scholarship | 1870–1926 |
| Lorensz Scholarship | 1876 |
| Director's Prize | 1883–1921 |
| De Soysa Science Prize | 1893 |
| Sir James Peiris Memorial Prize | 1905 |
| Donald Obeyesekere Prize | 1912 |
| F Dadabhoy Memorial Prize | 1922 |
| The Governor's Prize | 1922–1947 |
| C M Fernando Memorial Prize | 1925 |
| Harward Memorial Prize | 1926–1963 |
| Steward's Prize | 1929 |
| Dornhorst Memorial Prize | 1930 |
| Gate Mudaliar R E Gooneratne Memorial Prize | 1933 |
| G L Rupasinghe Memorial Prize | 1934 |
| Dr F E Weerasooriya Memorial Prize | 1934 |
| Canon Lucien Jansz Memorial Prize | 1934 |
| Atikar A Sellamuttu Prize | 1935 |
| Ruby Andries Memorial Prize | 1935 |
| Stubbs Prize | 1935–1970 |
| Sir Edward Denham Memorial Prize | 1939 |
| Dr C A Hewavitarane Memorial Prize | 1942 |
| Cecil Perera Memorial Scholarship | 1944 |
| The Governor General's Prize | 1947–1972 |
| Peter De Abrew Memorial Scholarship | 1948 |
| Dr H L H De Mel Memorial Prize | 1948 |
| Earle De Zoysa Memorial Prize | 1952 |
| P U Ratnaunga Prize | 1952 |
| J N Jinendradasa Memorial Prize | 1954 |
| E W Perera Memorial Memorial Scholarship | 1954 |
| Dudley K G De Silva Prize | 1957 |
| R H Wickramasinghe Memorial Prize | 1957 |
| Tissa Wickramasinghe Memorial Prize | 1963 |
| Amal De Mel Memorial Prize | 1966 |
| Harsha Panditha Gunawardena Memorial Scholarship | 1967 |
| T D Jayasooriaya Memorial Prize | 1970 |
| Mudaliyar L C Wijesinghe Prize | 1970 |
| The President's Prize | 1973 |
| Omeon Mendis Memorial Scholarship | 1973 |
| 1927 Group Scholarship | 1978 |
| George Rajapakse Memorial Scholarship | 1973 |
| Ajantha Wijesena Scholarship | 1978 |
| Sir Henry De Mel Memorial Prize | 1983 |
| Lalith Athulathmudali Memorial Prize | 1994 |
| J R Jayawardene Memorial Prize | 1997 |

=== Trophies and sports scholarships ===
- Col. T.G. Jayawardena Memorial Shield
- Maalin Dias Sports Scholarship
- E L Bradby — J C A Corea Prize
- Grp. Capt. D.S. Wickremasinghe Memorial Prize

== Sports and extracurricular activities ==
Sport is a major part of Royal College, with over 21 different sports played. Taking centre stage of the annual sporting calendar is the Royal-Thomian (Big Match), the Bradby and the Regatta. Royal College has always been at the top level of almost all school sports.

=== Royal-Thomian ===
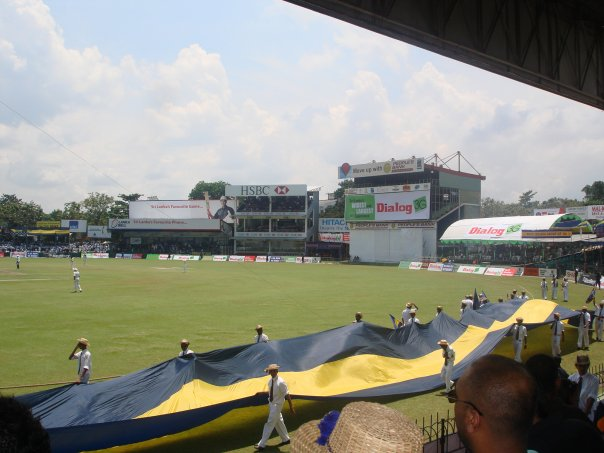
A Royal flag at the 128th Royal Thomian

Cricket has been played at the school since 1838 and the Royal College Cricket Club was formed in 1878 by Ashley Walker. The annual cricket match, the Big Match, played against the school's traditional rival, S. Thomas' College, Mt Lavinia is the second-longest uninterrupted cricket match series in the world. The original match was played between Colombo Academy and S. Thomas' College, Mutwal Modara in 1879, with schoolmasters participating as well as schoolboys. From 1880 onwards, only schoolboys were allowed to play in the match.

Until 2006 the tally stood with both schools winning 33 each and 61 drawn. This is preceded by the Cycle Parade which usually happens on the day before the big match, with the official objective of visiting the captain's house to encourage him.

=== Royal-Trinity Bradby Shield Encounter ===
The annual Bradby Shield Encounter is regarded as one of the premier sporting events in Sri Lanka. It is contested between Royal College and Trinity College on a home-and-away basis, with the winner determined by the aggregate score across both matches.

Royal College and Trinity College were among the pioneer schools in British Ceylon to adopt rugby as a sport, in 1916 and 1906 respectively. The first rugby encounter between the two schools took place on 31 July 1920, with Trinity emerging victorious by 26–0. In 1945, the outgoing principal of Royal College, E. L. Bradby, presented a shield, with the support of the then principal of Trinity College, C. E. Simithraaratchy, to be awarded annually in a two-legged rugby encounter. The inaugural Bradby Shield matches were held on 13 and 20 July 1945 and the encounter was won by Trinity with an aggregate score of 6–3.

In 1983, E. L. Bradby and his wife attended the second leg of the 39th encounter, held on 16 July, at the invitation of the Royal College Union.

In 1971, only the first leg of the 27th encounter was held due to the 1971 JVP insurrection. Royal College was awarded the Shield based on the result of the first leg, which they won 22–3. The series was suspended in 2020 and 2021 due to the COVID-19 pandemic, marking the first time in its history that it was completely halted.

=== Royal-Thomian Regatta ===
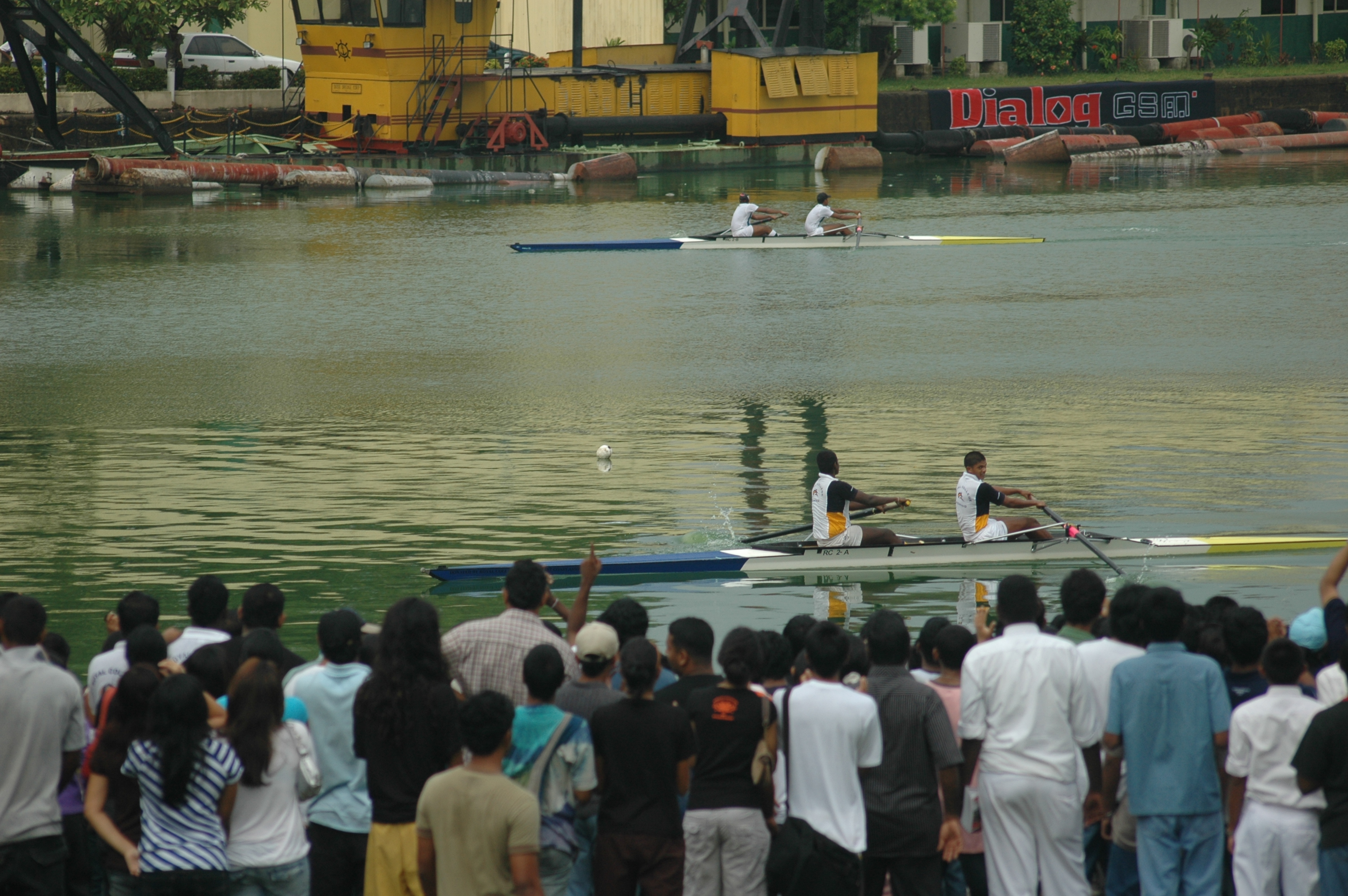
Royal (nearside) winning the Junior Pairs 2007 in a record time.

Royal was the first school to establish its own rowing program in 1953. The Royal Thomian Regatta is the annual regatta between Royal College and S. Thomas' College, Mt Lavinia. The Boat Race which is the event of a coxed four began in 1962. By 1966, it broadened out to give rise to the regatta having a card of six events, made up of two single sculls, two coxless pairs and two coxed fours. The events take place at the Beira Lake (alongside the Colombo Rowing Club) in Colombo around October each year with the T. N. Fernando Trophy awarded to the overall winner.

In 2007, under the captaincy of Maalik Aziz, Royal won the regatta with a record 40 points to nil, for the first time in its history. The Royal College Crew created records in all six events including a record for the Boat Race with a timing of 3 mins 11 secs (beating the previous record of 3 mins 19 secs).

== Co-Curricular activities ==
=== Clubs and societies ===
The college magazine and the Library Readers’ Association started in 1837. Today there are over 50 clubs and societies.

=== Expeditions ===
Organised by the Adventure Club, students have undertaken several expeditions:

- 1996 Himalayas
- 2001 Gokio Peak

=== Music ===
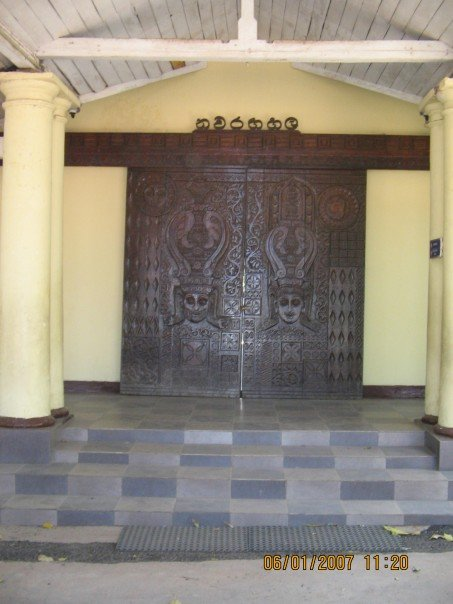
Entrance to the Navarangahala.

The college has a strong association with the study of music, both western and oriental. The college choir and the Royal College Orchestra, which is part of the Western Music Society (formally the Royal College Music Society) have a long and rich history. Performances are held at the College Hall, at the Navarangahala (designed specifically for oriental performance), and in recent times at the newly constructed Nelum Pokuna Performing Arts Theatre. There are several marching bands including the Cadet Band Platoon, Royal College Western Band, Junior Western Band, Percussion Band and the Oriental Band.

The annual musical festival SAGA organized by the School Development Society with the assistance of alumni has become an important event on Colombo's cultural calendar.

=== College choir ===
The Royal College Choir is one of the oldest school choirs in Sri Lanka. It was formed in 1919. The centenary celebrations were held in 2019.

In November 1919, the school choir was established alongside the Music Society (now known as the Western Music Society) by Lewis Walker, then serving as acting principal, with the support of staff members S. P. Foenander, J. M. Fonseka and E. K. de Zilwa.

Between 1920 and 1930, the choir won the "Meaden Shield" for ten consecutive years, including a perfect score of 200 out of 200 in 1926. The Royal College school song, "School of our Fathers", was first performed in 1928 during the same competition. The choir received support from Principal Harry Leslie Reed and master-in-charge Robert C. Edwards.

In July 2018, the choir won three silver medals at the 10th World Choir Games held in Tshwane, South Africa. The awards were in the categories of youth choir, pop choir and folklore with accompaniment.

Since 1993, the Western Music Society, together with the Royal College Choir, has organised the annual choral event "The Festival of Choirs".

=== Drama ===
Many plays are put on every year at Royal, organized by the English Drama Society (formally the Royal College Dramatic Society) and the Sinhala Drama Society. Sinhala and Tamil drama productions are hosted at the college's main theatre, the Navarangahala, which is specially designed for local drama and music which requires an open-air type auditorium in accordance with Natya Shastra. English language productions are hosted at the Lionel Wendt, which is near the school. The school's 'Little Theatre' is currently in use by the Royal College Film Society's screening of classical and contemporary films. Productions are staged regularly by alumni, organized by the Old Royalists Association of Dramatists and the Royal College Union.

== School magazines ==
The college magazine dates back to 1837 when The Colombo Academy Miscellany and Juvenile Repository was published on a monthly basis during the time of headmaster Rev. Joseph Marsh. The Royal College Magazine, the official school magazine, was first published in 1893 and was printed in the Times of Ceylon Press. Its first editor was E. W. Perera. The magazine was published until the 1970s by the school press, edited by students. Its publication resumed in 1993 and has continued since. Its editors include J. R. Jayawardene, Christopher Weeramantry, Lalith Athulathmudali, M. C. Sansoni, N. E. Weerasooriya, F. C. de Saram, Pieter Keuneman, Lakshman Wickremasinghe, Neville Kanakeratne and B St. E de Bruin.

The Royalist is the school paper, published every year.

== Principals and headmasters ==
The principal's Mansion.

In the early twentieth century, appointments of the Principal of Royal College was made by the Secretary of State for the Colonies, later with the ratification of the State Council of Ceylon. At present, the appointment is made by the Minister of Education, under the recommendation of the Department of Education. The post is considered to be the most senior Principal in Sri Lanka Education Administrative Service.

J. H. Marsh served as the first headmaster of the Colombo Academy. With the appointment of J. F. Haslam in 1948 the post of the head of the academy was renamed the principal, which continues to this day. J. C. A. Corea became the first Ceylonese (Sri Lankan) principal when he took office in 1946.

=== Headmasters ===
| Name | Entered office | Departed Office |
|---|---|---|
| J. H. Marsh Snr, MA(Edin) | 1835 | 1838 |
| J. Brooke H. Bailey (acting) | 1839 | 1842 |
| A. Kessen | 1842 | 1842 |

=== Principals ===
| Name | Entered office | Departed Office |
|---|---|---|
| J. F. Haslam, BA(Cantab) | 1839 | 1840 |
| Barcroft Boake, BA(Dublin), DD(Dublin) | 1842 | 1870 |
| George Todd, ISO, BA(Oxon) | 1871 | 1878 |
| J. B. Cull, MA(Oxon) | 1878 | 1890 |
| J. H. Marsh (Jnr), MA(Edin) | 1890 | 1892 |
| J. H. Harward, MA(Oxon) | 1892 | 1902 |
| C. Hartley, MA(Cantab) | 1903 | 1919 |
| Major H. L. Reed, MC, BA(Cantab) | 1920 | 1932 |
| L. H. W. Sampson, BA(Oxon), FRGS | 1932 | 1938 |
| E. L. Bradby, MA(Oxon) | 1939 | 1945 |
| J. C. A. Corea, MA(Lond), DipEd(Cantab) | 1946 | 1953 |
| D. K. G. de Silva, BSc(Lond), DipEd(Cey) | 1954 | 1966 |
| Deshabandu B. A. Premaratne, BA(Lond), MA(NY TTC) | 1967 | 1971 |
| D. G. Welikala, BSc(Lond) | 1971 | 1972 |
| D. J. N. Seneviratne, BSc(Lond), MA(Colombia), F.G.TRD, Cert(History)(Cey) | 1972 | 1972 |
| L. D. H. Peiris, BSc(Lond), DipEd(Cey) | 1972 | 1980 |
| C. T. M. Fernando, BA(Lond), CertEd(Cey), Cert Ed. Adm.(Edin) | 1981 | 1986 |
| B. Suriyaarachchi, BA(Cey), DipEd | 1986 | 1994 |
| S. H. Kumarasinghe, BA(Cey), DipEd | 1994 | 1997 |
| H. L. B. Gomes, BA(Pera), DipEd, Cert Ed. Mgt. | 1997 | 2003 |
| H. A. Upali Gunasekera, BSc(Pera), DipEd | 2003 | 2016 |
| B. A. Abeyratne | 2016 | 2021 |
| M. V. S. Gunathilaka, BA(Pera) | 2021 | 2022 |
| P. A. S. P. Jayalath | 2022 | 2022 |
| R. M. M. Rathnayake | 2022 | 2023 |
| Thilak Waththuhewa, M.Ed (IIEP France), BB Mgt (HRM) Special, (UoK) DipEd (Open University) | 2023 | 2025 |
| L.W.K. Silva | 2025 | 2025 |
| Athula Wijewardena | 2025 | incumbent |

== Academic staff ==
Notable staff members include:

- Senerat Gunewardene
- Anthony Gates
- Andrew Nicholl
- Ashley Walker
- Regi Siriwardena
- Don Carlin Gunawardena
- Paikiasothy Saravanamuttu
- R. I. T. Alles
- Lionel Ranwala
- L. V. Gooneratne
- Rathna Lalani Jayakody

== Notable alumni ==
Past pupils of Royal College Colombo, known as Old Royalists, include many distinguished figures. The school has produced the 1st Executive President of Sri Lanka, J. R. Jayewardene; the 9th Executive President, Ranil Wickremesinghe; the last Sultan of the Maldives, Muhammad Fareed Didi; and four Prime Ministers of Sri Lanka, including General Sir John Kotelawala, J. R. Jayewardene, Ranil Wickremesinghe, and Dinesh Gunawardena, as well as the first Ceylonese Acting Governor, Sir James Peiris.

Many of the prominent leaders of the independence movement in the early twentieth century, including Anagarika Dharmapala, E. W. Perera, Armand de Souza, Sir James Peiris, Sir Ponnambalam Arunachalam, Sir Ponnambalam Ramanathan and C. A. Hewavitharne, were educated at the Colombo Academy.

The school's alumni also include Shirley Amerasinghe (President of the United Nations General Assembly), Gamani Corea (Secretary-General of the UNCTD), Christopher Weeramantry (Vice President of the International Court of Justice), Sir Nicholas Attygalle (first Sri Lankan vice chancellor), V. K. Samaranayake (founder of the UCSC), Mohan Munasinghe (Vice Chairman of the IPCC) and General Deshamanya Sepala Attygalle (first Sri Lankan four-star general).

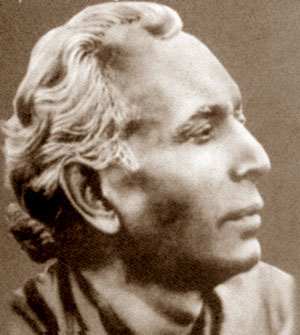
Anagarika Dharmapala

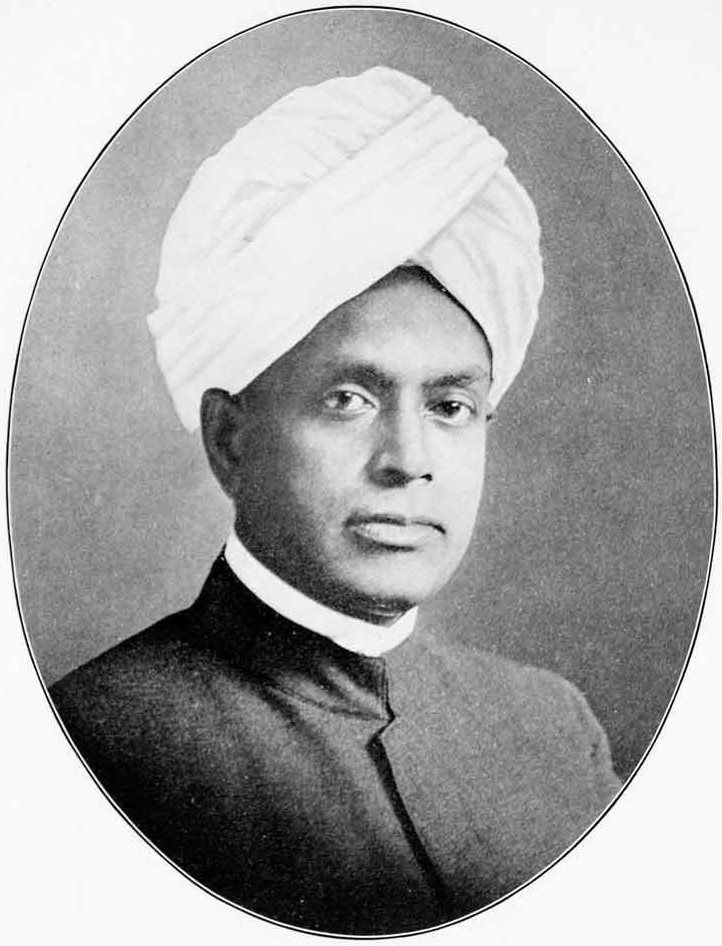
Sir Ponnambalam Ramanathan

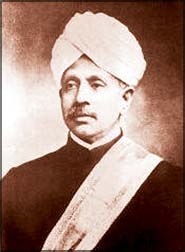
Sir Ponnambalam Arunachalam

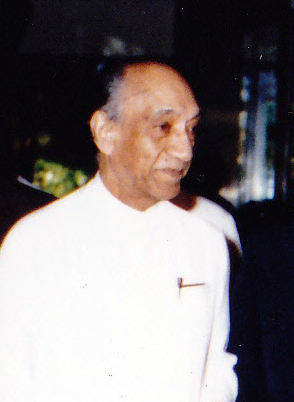
J. R. Jayewardene, First Executive President of Sri Lanka

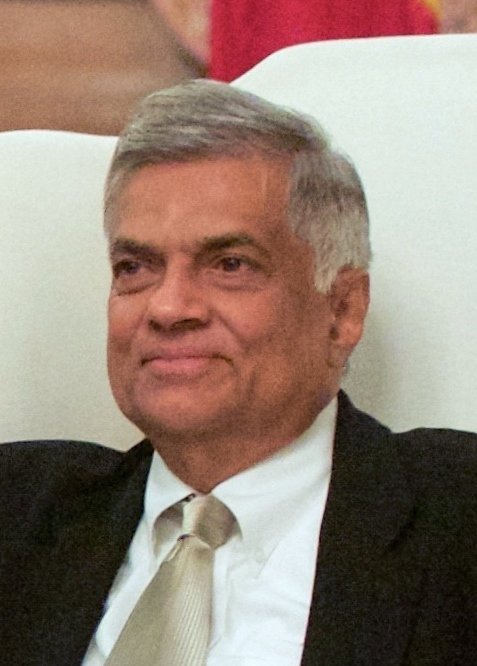
Ranil Wickramasinghe, Ninth President of Sri Lanka

== Royal College Union ==
The Royal College Union (RCU) is the alumni society (old boys' association) for the college. Founded in 1891, it is the oldest and most important such alumni society in Sri Lanka. The Royal College Union was set up to further the interests of the college and its past and present members, and to keep former pupils in touch with each other and with the school. Annually the RCU organizes many sporting events including the Royal-Thomian, the Bradby Shield Encounter, the Royal Thomian Regatta, as well as national initiatives such as EDEX (the biggest educational fair in the island) and carrying out development projects for the college.

== Rivalries and affiliations ==
Royal College maintains a century old rivalry with S. Thomas' College, Mount Lavinia as well as close ties with Trinity College, Kandy.

Royal College maintains a brother and sister school affiliation with Visakha Vidyalaya, its designated sister school.

== In popular culture ==
- In Martin Wickramasinghe's novel Kaliyugaya which was made into a film by Lester James Peries, the character Allan is an old Royalist.
- In the last part of Carl Muller's trilogy Once Upon a Tender Time, the central character Carlaboy von Bloss of the final story studies at Royal.
- In Nihal De Silva's novel The Giniralla Conspiracy, protagonist Mithra Dias studied at Royal College, as did antihero Kumudu Prasanna.
- In Martin Wickramasinghe's novel Yuganthaya which was made into a film by Lester James Peries, the character Malin is an old Royalist.
- In Madhubahashini Disanayaka Ratnayaka's novel There is Something I Have to Tell You, one of the main characters Janendra "Janu" Samarawickrama is an old Royalist.

== Lineage ==
Hill Street Academy
Colombo Academy
Queens College
Royal College Colombo
Royal College
Royal Preparatory School

== See also ==
- Education in Sri Lanka
- National Cadet Corps
- List of Ceylonese organizations with royal prefix
- Thurstan College
- Isipathana College
