= Navarangahala =

National theatre in Sri Lanka

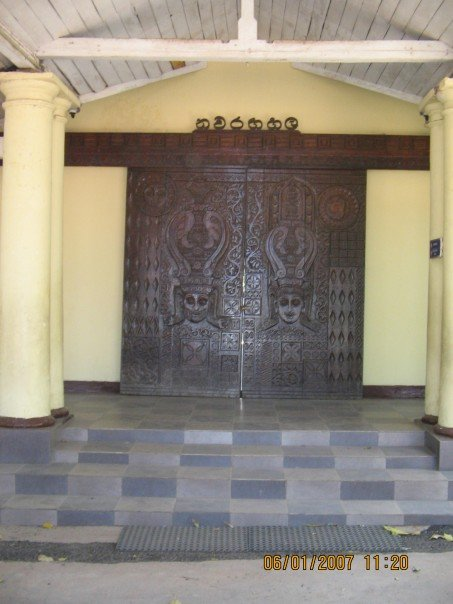
- Entrance to the Navarangahala

- Location in greater Colombo
- Location: Colombo, Sri Lanka
- Coordinates: 6°54′15″N 79°51′35″E
- Owner: Royal College Colombo
- Operator: Government of Sri Lanka
- Capacity: 1,500 seats
- Type: Theatre (Tropical modernism)
- Events: Music, Concerts, Theatre, Dance

Construction
- Built: 11 November 1966
- Opened: 1 August 1969
- Structural engineer: 4 Field Engineer Regiment, SLE

The Navarangahala ("New Theatre"), in Colombo, is one of the main national theatres of Sri Lanka.

== History ==
I. M. R. A. Iriyagolle, Minister of Education and Cultural Affairs, laid the foundation stone for the Royal Primary School Hall on 11 November 1966. Specially designed for local drama and music which required an open-air type auditorium in accordance with Natya Shastra, construction took place between 1966 and 1969, carried out by the 4 Field Engineer Regiment, SLE. Funding for the construction and equipment came from the government and donations. Until it was built there were no purpose-built indoor theatres for the local arts, apart from the few open-air amphitheatres. It was officially opened by Prime Minister Dudley Senanayake on 1 August 1969.

Following the amalgamation of Royal Preparatory School with Royal College in December 1977, Navarangahala became part of Royal College.

=== Notable events ===
On 22 May 1972 the House of Representatives of Ceylon met at the Navarangahala to finalise and approve the Republic Constitution, which proclaimed establishment of the Republic of Sri Lanka.
