= Colombo Electoral District =

Electoral district of Sri Lanka

- Constituency for the Parliament of Sri Lanka
- Region: Western Province
- Electorate: 1,765,351

Current constituency
- Created: 1978
- Seats: 20 (1989–01); 21 (2001–04); 20 (2004–10); 19 (2010–2024); 18 (2024-present)
- MPs: NPP (14) Harini Amarasuriya; Chathuranga Abeysinghe; Sunil Watagala; Lakshman Nipuna Arachchi; Aruna Panagoda; Eranga Gunasekara; Harshana Nanayakkara; Kaushalya Ariyarathne; Asitha Niroshana; Rizvie Salih; Susantha Dodawatta; Chandana Sooriyaarachchi; Samanmalee Gunasinghe; Dewananda Suraweera SJB (4) Sajith Premadasa; Harsha de Silva; Mujibur Rahman; S. M. Marikkar

Colombo Electoral District is one of the 22 multi-member electoral districts of Sri Lanka created by the 1978 Constitution of Sri Lanka. The district is conterminous with the administrative district of Colombo in the Western province. The district currently elects 19 of the 225 members of the Sri Lankan Parliament and had 1,765,351 registered electors in 2024. The district is Sri Lanka's Electorate Number 01.

== Polling Divisions ==
The Colombo Electoral District consists of the following polling divisions:

A: Colombo North

B: Colombo Central

C: Borella

D: Colombo East

E: Colombo West

F: Dehiwala

G: Ratmalana

H: Kolonnawa

I: Kotte

J: Kaduwela

K: Avissawella

L: Homagama

M: Maharagama

N: Kesbewa

O: Moratuwa

== Presidential Elections ==
=== 1982 presidential election ===
Results of the 1st presidential election held on 20 October 1982:

Candidate	Party	Votes per Polling Division															Postal Votes	Total Votes	%
Candidate	Party	Avissawella	Borella	Colombo Central	Colombo East	Colombo North	Colombo West	Dehiwala	Homagama	Kaduwela	Kesbewa	Kolonnawa	Kotte	Maharagama	Moratuwa	Ratmalana	Postal Votes	Total Votes	%
J. R. Jayewardene	UNP	26,648	21,383	68,346	21,367	29,380	22,115	23,730	27,981	27,963	25,576	25,221	25,129	26,967	32,096	21,280	11,108	436,290	57.86%
Hector Kobbekaduwa	SLFP	23,481	10,946	22,061	11,268	10,641	4,751	13,194	23,135	25,275	26,553	21,153	14,814	23,874	22,744	14,111	6,475	274,476	36.40%
Rohana Wijeweera	JVP	1,687	1,058	2,121	1,352	1,645	576	1,139	2,140	3,338	2,248	2,125	1,731	2,595	2,625	1,670	530	28,580	3.79%
Colvin R. de Silva	LSSP	238	395	415	828	361	409	695	591	569	851	504	527	946	1,137	778	411	9,655	1.28%
Kumar Ponnambalam	ACTC	70	132	810	320	477	521	201	50	33	29	29	32	27	43	99	149	3,022	0.40%
Vasudeva Nanayakkara	NSSP	205	63	110	142	60	156	117	205	119	150	86	108	116	137	146	88	2,008	0.27%
Valid Votes		52,329	33,977	93,863	35,277	42,564	28,528	39,076	54,102	57,297	55,407	49,118	42,341	54,525	58,782	38,084	18,761	754,031	100.00%
Rejected Votes		551	305	740	426	575	314	406	548	719	530	545	374	593	707	415	242	7,990	
Total Polled		52,880	34,282	94,603	35,703	43,139	28,842	39,482	54,650	58,016	55,937	49,663	42,715	55,118	59,489	38,499	19,003	762,021	
Registered Electors		62,628	47,123	127,452	48,760	57,534	40,375	51,622	68,955	73,006	71,002	62,523	59,048	71,597	80,297	50,269		972,191	
Turnout (%)		84.44%	72.75%	74.23%	73.22%	74.98%	71.44%	76.48%	79.25%	79.47%	78.78%	79.43%	72.34%	76.98%	74.09%	76.59%		78.38%	

=== 1988 presidential election ===
Results of the 2nd presidential election held on 19 December 1988:

Candidate	Party	Votes per Polling Division															Postal Votes	Total Votes	%
Candidate	Party	Avissawella	Borella	Colombo Central	Colombo East	Colombo North	Colombo West	Dehiwala	Homagama	Kaduwela	Kesbewa	Kolonnawa	Kotte	Maharagama	Moratuwa	Ratmalana	Postal Votes	Total Votes	%
Ranasinghe Premadasa	UNP	24,292	16,452	58,795	16,480	22,389	14,670	18,326	20,810	22,872	25,549	23,895	18,834	20,770	31,546	18,409	7,248	361,337	49.14%
Sirimavo Bandaranaike	SLFP	23,721	13,083	26,083	13,477	10,744	7,473	16,599	27,570	30,600	35,184	25,050	22,607	31,396	29,654	18,308	8,409	339,958	46.23%
Ossie Abeygunasekera	SLPP	1,199	1,702	4,521	2,298	2,259	1,380	1,707	1,730	2,108	2,228	2,411	2,163	2,260	3,488	1,783	783	34,020	4.63%
Valid Votes		49,212	31,237	89,399	32,255	35,392	23,523	36,632	50,110	55,580	62,961	51,356	43,604	54,426	64,688	38,500	16,440	735,315	100.00%
Rejected Votes		570	499	1,572	666	647	342	520	679	806	879	849	563	779	977	584	363	11,295	
Total Polled		49,782	31,736	90,971	32,921	36,039	23,865	37,152	50,789	56,386	63,840	52,205	44,167	55,205	65,665	39,084	16,803	746,610	
Registered Electors		68,892	47,917	133,920	51,225	54,149	37,220	52,969	86,987	87,693	89,277	75,650	67,194	83,598	96,841	55,248		1,088,780	
Turnout		72.26%	66.23%	67.93%	64.27%	66.56%	64.12%	70.14%	58.39%	64.30%	71.51%	69.01%	65.73%	66.04%	67.81%	70.74%		68.57%	

=== 1994 presidential election ===
Results of the 3rd presidential election held on 9 November 1994:

Candidate	Party	Votes per Polling Division															Postal Votes	Total Votes	%
Candidate	Party	Avissawella	Borella	Colombo Central	Colombo East	Colombo North	Colombo West	Dehiwala	Homagama	Kaduwela	Kesbewa	Kolonnawa	Kotte	Maharagama	Moratuwa	Ratmalana	Postal Votes	Total Votes	%
Chandrika Kumaratunga	PA	31,132	20,837	56,219	23,867	26,250	14,329	23,977	45,072	51,876	54,327	40,296	31,646	47,818	45,403	28,666	15,993	557,708	64.82%
Srima Dissanayake	UNP	23,126	13,162	33,824	12,806	15,924	8,557	12,783	22,369	23,475	22,130	21,313	16,331	19,514	24,493	12,275	6,659	288,741	33.56%
Harischandra Wijayatunga	SMBP	787	236	245	373	118	179	326	444	599	464	330	521	638	280	273	246	6,059	0.70%
A. J. Ranasinghe	Ind 1	230	124	291	182	103	180	195	284	521	268	201	232	240	234	151	97	3,533	0.41%
Hudson Samarasinghe	Ind 2	290	96	271	115	138	68	111	279	241	210	202	118	158	127	83	19	2,526	0.29%
Nihal Galappaththi	SLPF	163	57	149	72	75	19	78	171	205	179	156	97	153	118	71	56	1,819	0.21%
Valid Votes		55,728	34,512	90,999	37,415	42,608	23,332	37,470	68,619	76,917	77,578	62,498	48,945	68,521	70,655	41,519	23,070	860,386	100.00%
Rejected Votes		1,313	617	2,020	843	947	460	614	1,102	1,445	1,159	1,120	762	1,328	988	887	455	16,060	
Total Polled		57,041	35,129	93,019	38,258	43,555	23,792	38,084	69,721	78,362	78,737	63,618	49,707	69,849	71,643	42,406	23,525	876,446	
Registered Electors		81,213	52,007	139,012	57,049	63,528	36,915	55,301	106,536	113,173	110,948	90,167	71,213	101,317	97,831	59,749		1,235,959	
Turnout		70.24%	67.55%	66.91%	67.06%	68.56%	64.45%	68.87%	65.44%	69.24%	70.97%	70.56%	69.80%	68.94%	73.23%	70.97%		70.91%	

=== 1999 presidential election ===
Results of the 4th presidential election held on 21 December 1999:

Candidate	Party	Votes per Polling Division															Postal Votes	Total Votes	%
Candidate	Party	Avissawella	Borella	Colombo Central	Colombo East	Colombo North	Colombo West	Dehiwala	Homagama	Kaduwela	Kesbewa	Kolonnawa	Kotte	Maharagama	Moratuwa	Ratmalana	Postal Votes	Total Votes	%
Chandrika Kumaratunga	PA	33,957	17,023	35,416	17,777	18,114	7,327	18,683	46,823	50,535	51,240	36,907	24,782	43,584	41,380	22,868	7,894	474,310	49.18%
Ranil Wickremasinghe	UNP	26,903	19,151	59,234	22,281	32,714	16,531	19,126	30,859	32,951	31,302	28,681	21,455	27,338	33,017	17,572	6,070	425,185	44.08%
Nandana Gunathilake	JVP	2,976	1,289	1,955	1,486	1,281	406	1,346	4,878	6,170	5,236	3,385	2,075	4,168	3,692	2,514	1,152	44,009	4.56%
Harischandra Wijayatunga	SMBP	334	275	272	410	115	210	412	662	916	940	468	763	1,119	431	485	397	8,209	0.85%
Vasudeva Nanayakkara	LDA	300	148	424	419	408	539	324	267	338	346	188	231	340	288	203	237	5,000	0.52%
Abdul; Rasool	SLMP	109	119	630	109	163	92	86	91	91	71	107	47	78	76	94	17	1,980	0.21%
Rajiva; Wijesinha	LPSL	123	57	137	89	94	99	78	102	101	101	93	87	82	72	55	6	1,376	0.14%
Tennyson Edirisuriya	Ind 1	113	42	104	59	86	36	44	129	112	134	113	83	117	127	60	11	1,370	0.14%
W. V. M. Ranjith	Ind 2	158	57	178	61	95	17	33	140	102	105	97	37	98	96	42	3	1,319	0.14%
Kamal; Karunadasa	PLSF	91	23	82	34	46	13	17	69	79	70	42	41	68	70	36	2	783	0.08%
Hudson Samarasinghe	Ind 3	41	13	53	19	26	15	9	32	32	20	23	10	31	20	10	1	355	0.04%
Ariyawansha Dissanayaka	DUNF	30	5	26	16	14	7	20	34	34	32	16	10	25	38	18	4	329	0.03%
A. W. Premawardhana	PFF	47	11	24	10	11	6	16	37	29	26	13	15	33	20	7	4	309	0.03%
Valid Votes		65,182	38,213	98,535	42,770	53,167	25,298	40,194	84,123	91,490	89,623	70,133	49,636	77,081	79,327	43,964	15,798	964,534	100.00%
Rejected Votes		1,495	1,058	2,605	1,388	1,409	896	1,446	2,383	2,530	2,967	1,819	1,675	2,876	2,006	1,500	1,144	29,197	
Total Polled		66,677	39,271	101,140	44,158	54,576	26,194	41,640	86,506	94,020	92,590	71,952	51,311	79,957	81,333	45,464	16,942	993,731	
Registered Electors		87,913	55,338	143,993	64,386	77,447	40,908	58,407	116,577	126,119	121,836	96,164	70,424	108,622	105,483	63,466		1,337,083	
Turnout		75.84%	70.97%	70.24%	68.58%	70.47%	64.03%	71.29%	74.21%	74.55%	76.00%	74.82%	72.86%	73.61%	77.11%	71.64%		74.32%	

=== 2005 presidential election ===
Results of the 5th presidential election held on 17 November 2005:

Candidate	Party	Votes per Polling Division															Postal Votes	Total Votes	%
Candidate	Party	Avissawella	Borella	Colombo Central	Colombo East	Colombo North	Colombo West	Dehiwala	Homagama	Kaduwela	Kesbewa	Kolonnawa	Kotte	Maharagama	Moratuwa	Ratmalana	Postal Votes	Total Votes	%
Ranil Wickremasinghe	UNP	36,227	25,784	78,908	28,832	45,161	20,475	24,660	43,477	47,025	42,042	40,744	27,106	36,093	43,207	23,743	6,143	569,627	51.12%
Mahinda Rajapaksa	UPFA	41,936	15,644	20,395	16,919	14,270	5,104	18,005	64,433	65,829	66,660	40,616	26,987	53,681	48,047	25,004	10,901	534,431	47.96%
Siritunga Jayasuriya	USP	281	115	448	102	270	52	67	242	192	163	178	83	103	232	92	8	2,628	0.24%
Victor; Hettigoda	ULPP	114	80	117	159	101	129	158	184	207	192	117	117	173	143	121	62	2,174	0.20%
A. A. Suraweera	NDF	209	60	189	66	112	22	57	206	236	238	166	88	138	192	76	2	2,057	0.18%
Chamil Jayaneththi	NLF	88	32	71	33	59	37	34	68	59	67	47	31	52	52	36	9	775	0.07%
Anura; De Silva	ULF	66	22	93	24	39	10	20	55	54	59	34	19	41	38	26	1	601	0.05%
Aruna de Soyza	RPP	51	18	28	11	17	3	19	62	69	57	36	17	46	57	23	5	519	0.05%
Wimal Geeganage	SLNF	33	17	37	15	20	10	13	64	42	40	27	18	26	33	22	5	422	0.04%
Wije; Dias	SEP	36	23	37	23	27	10	19	25	43	37	24	11	35	37	17	6	410	0.04%
A. K. J. Arachchige	DUA	31	10	69	13	27	5	15	44	37	33	19	20	24	34	16	1	398	0.04%
P. Nelson; Perera	SLPF	16	3	20	4	5	7	5	19	8	10	13	3	5	13	3	0	134	0.01%
H. S. Dharmadwaja	UNAF	10	1	12	5	3	1	5	3	4	4	7	4	8	4	2	1	74	0.01%
Valid Votes		79,098	41,809	100,424	46,206	60,111	25,865	43,077	108,882	113,805	109,602	82,028	54,504	90,425	92,089	49,181	17,144	1,114,250	100.00%
Rejected Votes		865	453	1,616	694	939	399	369	1,035	1,209	1,110	892	516	910	975	557	340	12,879	
Total Polled		79,963	42,262	102,040	46,900	61,050	26,264	43,446	109,917	115,014	110,712	82,920	55,020	91,335	93,064	49,738	17,484	1,127,129	
Registered Electors		101,065	60,678	144,916	65,732	85,967	38,621	58,728	141,974	148,435	140,094	107,725	73,274	119,137	115,759	66,432		1,468,537	
Turnout		79.12%	69.65%	70.41%	71.35%	71.02%	68.00%	73.98%	77.42%	77.48%	79.03%	76.97%	75.09%	76.66%	80.39%	74.87%		76.75%	

=== 2010 presidential election ===
Results of the 6th presidential election held on 26 January 2010:

Candidate	Party	Votes per Polling Division															Postal Votes	Total Votes	%
Candidate	Party	Avissawella	Borella	Colombo Central	Colombo East	Colombo North	Colombo West	Dehiwala	Homagama	Kaduwela	Kesbewa	Kolonnawa	Kotte	Maharagama	Moratuwa	Ratmalana	Postal Votes	Total Votes	%
Mahinda; Rajapaksa	UPFA	53,664	16,909	21,824	19,107	17,605	6,350	19,457	80,799	76,103	77,474	46,002	29,125	59,360	52,627	26,215	12,119	614,740	52.93%
Sarath; Fonseka	NDF	28,875	23,636	73,152	28,334	42,896	19,211	24,441	39,414	45,082	40,474	39,497	26,129	35,162	37,233	22,589	6,897	533,022	45.90%
A. S. P. Liyanage	SLLP	94	109	170	207	99	33	63	115	124	134	178	136	107	157	71	1	1,798	0.15%
M. C. M. Ismail	DUNF	151	67	259	81	197	45	52	143	127	106	135	55	65	69	46	8	1,606	0.14%
C. J. Sugathsiri Gamage	UDF	129	65	387	74	222	43	33	84	105	83	120	46	51	86	44	7	1,579	0.14%
A. A. Suraweera	NDF	215	34	96	43	72	20	34	217	179	189	106	45	103	125	59	3	1,540	0.13%
W. V. M. Ranjith	Ind 1	148	47	67	30	57	18	39	131	132	134	96	56	109	108	45	2	1,219	0.10%
Vikramabahu; Karunaratne	LF	68	46	113	109	112	104	73	52	47	47	43	51	49	67	55	16	1,052	0.09%
Lal; Perera	ONF	43	34	134	38	80	18	18	42	40	50	63	31	23	42	24	0	680	0.06%
Sarath; Manamendra	NSH	42	29	105	30	89	19	22	39	45	53	47	19	30	37	22	1	629	0.05%
Ukkubanda; Wijekoon	Ind 3	52	28	49	31	26	29	25	52	75	70	28	33	40	38	22	2	600	0.05%
M. K. Shivajilingam	Ind 5	42	28	81	66	86	63	43	23	20	16	15	10	17	19	17	2	548	0.05%
Siritunga Jayasuriya	USP	56	23	86	44	43	10	14	37	45	33	39	24	29	35	22	4	544	0.05%
Aithurus; M. Illias	Ind 2	37	16	73	19	29	12	19	33	41	33	36	16	23	23	24	3	437	0.04%
Wije; Dias	SEP	30	11	32	25	32	21	12	24	26	34	17	9	26	21	17	1	338	0.03%
Ven.Battaramulla; Seelaratana Thero	JP	12	7	23	14	9	1	6	18	17	19	10	8	13	8	7	4	176	0.02%
Sanath; Pinnaduwa	NA	9	7	45	13	12	5	8	10	8	7	15	4	4	12	10	0	169	0.01%
M. Mohamed; Musthaffa	Ind 4	13	7	30	4	10	5	7	13	18	10	7	2	9	11	7	1	154	0.01%
Sarath; Kongahage	UNAF	10	7	29	14	10	8	5	7	11	7	7	6	12	4	7	0	144	0.01%
Aruna de Soyza	RPP	17	8	25	3	7	5	2	11	13	13	14	4	6	11	3	1	143	0.01%
Senaratna de Silva	PNF	16	6	23	4	8	5	5	7	11	11	7	10	10	7	6	0	136	0.01%
M. B. Thaminimulla	ACAKO	9	8	23	5	14	5	5	8	7	9	4	6	7	12	4	2	128	0.01%
Valid Votes		83,732	41,132	96,826	48,295	61,715	26,030	44,383	121,279	122,276	119,006	86,486	55,825	95,255	90,752	49,316	19,074	1,161,382	100.00%
Rejected Votes		689	543	1,320	699	1,022	444	465	770	850	803	893	557	768	745	512	314	11,394	
Total Polled		84,421	41,675	98,146	48,994	62,737	26,474	44,848	122,049	123,126	119,809	87,379	56,382	96,023	91,497	49,828	19,388	1,172,776	
Registered Electors		108,138	58,757	139,822	68,643	95,385	38,921	61,194	155,720	158,736	148,696	112,363	73,009	121,247	114,601	66,622		1,521,854	
Turnout		78.07%	70.93%	70.19%	71.38%	65.77%	68.02%	73.29%	78.38%	77.57%	80.57%	77.76%	77.23%	79.20%	79.84%	74.79%		77.06%	

=== 2015 presidential election ===
Results of the 7th presidential election held on 8 January 2015:

Candidate	Party	Votes per Polling Division															Postal Votes	Total Votes	%
Candidate	Party	Avissawella	Borella	Colombo Central	Colombo East	Colombo North	Colombo West	Dehiwala	Homagama	Kaduwela	Kesbewa	Kolonnawa	Kotte	Maharagama	Moratuwa	Ratmalana	Postal Votes	Total Votes	%
Maithripala; Sirisena	NDF	47,728	31,469	82,495	35,167	51,537	23,915	30,955	63,563	68,886	61,116	56,835	36,614	51,480	48,599	29,554	12,160	725,073	55.93%
Mahinda; Rajapaksa	UPFA	51,351	15,148	17,779	16,601	16,423	6,164	15,932	77,415	70,970	74,189	39,767	24,663	53,327	46,885	23,144	12,856	562,614	43.2%
A. S. P. Liyanage	SLLP	66	78	185	47	101	21	34	74	70	57	90	41	57	49	29	8	1,007	0.08%
M. I. Mohanmed; Mishlar	UPF	61	36	298	32	90	14	39	55	57	45	129	17	37	39	26	3	978	0.08%
R. A. Sirisena	PNF	112	37	73	23	61	12	32	128	84	83	80	39	66	78	30	5	943	0.07%
R. Peduru; Arachchi	ULPP	80	37	131	33	75	15	17	53	81	56	86	27	38	28	25	4	786	0.06%
Namal; Rajapaksa	ONF	80	30	39	32	48	13	14	80	84	70	50	33	49	57	31	6	716	0.06%
Duminda; Nagamuwa	FSP	84	22	59	31	39	8	26	67	80	85	46	22	65	31	29	21	715	0.06%
Aithurus; M. Illias	Ind 1	67	31	120	25	59	12	28	70	64	54	62	17	7	45	18	3	702	0.05%
Siritunga; Jayasuriya	USP	57	21	69	36	50	19	9	36	41	40	27	22	39	30	22	7	525	0.04%
Ven.Battaramulla; Seelarathana Thero	JSP	30	16	22	13	10	8	21	50	75	53	38	28	47	24	24	20	479	0.04%
Vajirapani; Wijesiriwardene	SEP	19	16	32	21	29	12	12	23	31	30	28	10	38	27	15	3	346	0.03%
Sarath Manamendra	NSH	39	7	43	16	25	11	6	33	35	24	22	7	17	25	9	2	321	0.02%
Anurudha; Polgampola	Ind 2	26	7	44	14	25	9	8	26	27	17	21	7	16	14	11	2	274	0.02%
Sundaram; Mahendran	NSSP	28	10	25	18	28	22	14	21	8	7	15	6	7	14	10	3	236	0.02%
M. B. Theminimulla	ACAKO	15	15	26	11	17	6	5	19	15	21	18	12	17	14	10	3	214	0.02%
Prasanna; Priyankara	DNM	16	5	19	3	15	8	9	21	18	14	8	14	12	11	7	1	181	0.01%
Wimal; Geeganage	SLNF	11	2	17	5	9	4	3	15	5	12	10	3	13	7	7	3	126	0.01%
Jayantha; Kulathunga	ULGC	10	3	21	9	8	2	5	13	11	10	4	6	11	4	3	4	124	0.01%
Valid Votes		94,880	46,990	101,497	52,137	68,649	30,275	47,169	141,762	140,642	135,983	97,336	59,588	105,353	95,981	53,004	25,114	1,296,360	100.00%
Rejected Votes		1,032	547	1,237	668	1,146	325	599	1,481	1,534	1,393	1,275	703	1220	958	680	536	15,334	1.17%
Total Polled		95,912	45,537	102,734	52,805	69,795	30,600	47,768	143,243	142,176	137,376	98,611	60,291	106,573	96,939	53,684	25,650	1,311,694	82.67%
Registered Electors		117,472	60,109	131,482	66,941	89,771	40,609	59,812	174,909	173,355	164,774	120,617	74,934	129,801	115,219	66,793	26,062	1,586,598	

=== 2019 presidential election ===
Results of the 8th presidential election held on 16 November 2019:

Candidate	Party	Votes per Polling Division															Postal Votes	Total Votes	%
Candidate	Party	Avissawella	Borella	Colombo Central	Colombo East	Colombo North	Colombo West	Dehiwala	Homagama	Kaduwela	Kesbewa	Kolonnawa	Kotte	Maharagama	Moratuwa	Ratmalana	Postal Votes	Total Votes	%
Gotabaya; Rajapaksa	SLPP	61,755	18,850	16,341	19,619	16,986	6,644	19,122	106,102	98,807	99,062	53,232	31,853	71,893	57,645	28,085	21,717	727,713	53.19%
Sajith; Premadasa	NDF	34,532	27,436	80,076	28,599	52,983	21,345	25,004	40,157	41,747	37,430	50,456	22,628	29,688	36,390	23,156	8,294	559,921	40.92%
Anura Kumara; Dissanayake	NMPP	3,184	1,500	1,528	1,750	1,084	647	1,480	7,596	7,605	7,343	3,940	2,439	5,820	3,534	2,124	2,229	53,803	3.93%
Mahesh; Senanayake	NPP	364	329	186	571	119	236	414	946	1,424	1,172	526	875	1,165	906	500	522	10,335	0.76%
Rohan; Pallewatte	JSWP	171	58	56	85	73	42	86	266	315	267	173	152	235	190	111	37	2,317	0.17%
Ajantha; Perera	SPSL	256	60	50	76	68	27	59	291	255	204	131	75	172	157	94	27	2,002	0.15%
M. L. A. M. Hizbullah	Ind 11	156	11	207	56	136	26	68	180	145	130	152	53	82	124	71	5	1,660	0.12%
Ariyawansa; Dissanayake	DUNF	154	74	157	74	193	29	29	90	103	93	129	28	54	106	49	5	1,367	0.1%
Ven.Battaramulla; Seelarathana Thero	JSP	70	43	166	33	113	22	37	57	69	72	94	43	54	52	36	13	974	0.07%
Milroy; Fernando	Ind 09	87	52	170	40	121	16	27	56	59	47	96	25	24	53	33	5	911	0.07%
Namal; Rajapaksa	NUA	66	28	34	19	32	8	19	104	101	86	51	29	56	70	32	6	741	0.05%
Siripala; Amarasinghe	Ind 02	95	30	120	30	97	15	15	52	51	39	66	15	30	35	30	5	725	0.05%
Ajantha de zoysa	RJP	82	15	31	19	41	6	16	79	83	53	67	21	41	91	26	4	675	0.05%
Duminda; Nagamuwa	FSP	73	14	19	21	23	4	28	68	75	62	30	26	58	24	37	27	589	0.04%
Ven.Aparekke; Punnananda Thero	Ind 01	44	18	77	22	55	15	14	40	32	30	34	8	21	22	20	16	468	0.03%
Jayantha; Ketagoda	Ind 07	41	30	51	25	44	6	5	30	30	28	43	11	24	33	15	4	420	0.03%
Anuruddha; Polgampola	Ind 08	38	12	50	15	51	9	9	33	23	12	35	8	10	26	12	4	343	0.03%
M. K. Shivajilingam	Ind 10	19	69	41	38	62	53	16	10	11	9	15	3	5	24	13	5	335	0.02%
A. S. P. Liyanage	SLLP	32	24	37	12	34	6	13	32	22	17	29	10	23	24	11	1	327	0.02%
Subramanium; Gunaratnam	ONF	40	12	25	17	32	9	4	27	21	10	24	5	10	18	6	5	265	0.02%
Vajirapani; Wijesiriwardene	SEP	19	8	24	21	18	5	5	22	21	22	18	8	21	17	17	0	246	0.02%
Aithurus; M. Illias	Ind 03	20	11	22	11	23	9	4	25	22	16	17	6	15	13	6	1	221	0.02%
Sirithunga; Jayasuriya	USP	21	8	33	17	9	4	6	15	17	15	15	8	12	13	9	5	207	0.02%
Rajiva; Wijesinha	Ind 14	12	5	27	12	22	12	7	10	12	22	15	15	13	11	6	3	204	0.01%
Aruna de soyza	DNM	18	5	17	9	15	5	6	11	22	21	12	8	11	23	11	4	198	0.01%
Sarath; Manamendra	NSU	17	10	18	9	16	1	4	12	13	16	14	4	12	15	6	0	167	0.01%
Piyasiri; Wijenayake	Ind 13	33	4	11	3	17	1	1	19	21	12	10	3	6	19	2	3	165	0.01%
Ashoka; Wadigamangawa	Ind 12	16	2	13	9	13	3	7	15	18	10	5	5	11	12	5	5	149	0.01%
A. H. M. Alavi	Ind 04	14	6	20	5	15	4	3	15	13	11	14	2	6	7	3	3	141	0.01%
Sarath; Keerthirathna	Ind 05	9	5	13	3	15	3	7	11	11	10	8	4	3	9	6	4	121	0.01%
Saman; Perera	OPPP	12	4	12	9	21	0	2	8	16	9	5	3	3	10	4	2	120	0.01%
B. G. Nandimithra	NSSP	12	5	17	3	8	0	3	8	4	12	13	2	11	6	0	1	105	0.01%
Priyantha; Edirisinghe	ACAKO	10	6	14	5	8	0	1	8	6	6	11	6	5	3	6	3	98	0.01%
Samaraweera; Weeravanni	Ind 15	15	6	9	6	11	1	4	3	9	8	7	4	3	2	4	0	92	0.01%
Samansiri; Herath	Ind 06	3	2	8	2	5	0	0	2	5	4	8	1	4	3	4	1	52	0.00%
Valid Votes		101,490	48,752	99,680	51,245	72,643	29,213	46,525	156,400	151,188	146,360	109,495	58,386	109,601	99,689	54,550	32,962	1,368,177	100.00%
Rejected Votes		887	672	1,156	727	1,335	458	576	1,314	1,498	1,444	1,135	745	1,129	1,008	698	531	15,333	0.92%
Total Polled		102,377	49,424	100,836	51,972	73,998	29,671	47,701	157,714	152,686	147,804	110,630	59,131	110,730	100,695	55,248	33,493	1,383,510	82.82%
Registered Electors		119,905	61,169	124,354	65,398	93,705	40,187	58,892	186,252	183,787	174,829	132,381	73,926	133,614	118,956	69,128	33,920	1,670,403	

=== 2024 presidential election ===
Results of the 9th presidential election held on 21 September 2024:

Candidate	Party	Votes per Polling Division															Postal Votes	Votes	%
Candidate	Party	Avissawella	Borella	Colombo Central	Colombo East	Colombo North	Colombo West	Dehiwala	Homagama	Kaduwela	Kesbewa	Kolonnawa	Kotte	Maharagama	Moratuwa	Ratmalana	Postal Votes	Votes	%
Anura Kumara; Dissanayake	NPP	47,219	17,290	20,220	18,523	17,978	7,778	19,338	91,770	84,299	83,049	49,239	25,123	58,692	45,299	23,282	20,864	629,963	47.21%
Sajith; Premadasa	SJB	28,767	15,497	46,063	13,637	32,289	9,697	12,505	29,912	26,538	24,312	33,127	11,979	17,174	24,319	12,212	4,080	342,108	25.64%
Ranil; Wickremesinghe	Ind16	19,669	10,188	19,397	12,566	15,692	8,382	11,565	29,348	30,670	29,622	20,069	12,725	22,782	19,025	11,091	7,625	281,436	21.09%
Namal; Rajapaksa	SLPP	2,929	1,101	1,123	825	954	348	1,163	3,979	3,095	4,076	2,350	1,239	2,424	2,483	1,422	561	30,432	2.24%
Dilith; Jayaweera	SLCP	1,818	659	367	706	442	233	753	4,304	3,771	4,053	1,730	1,312	3,020	1,712	924	552	26,356	1.98%
Pakkiyaselvam; Ariyanethiran	Ind09	39	60	295	519	585	783	375	27	24	29	58	18	14	105	174	63	3,168	0.24%
Sarath; Fonseka	Ind12	156	71	126	90	109	35	81	190	224	215	142	124	169	143	106	63	2,044	0.15%
D. M. Bandaranayake	Ind13	188	71	106	55	96	17	42	199	253	147	157	68	112	119	49	12	1,691	0.13%
Wijeyadasa; Rajapakshe	JPF	146	41	97	41	97	16	23	159	174	142	101	72	229	97	46	73	1,554	0.12%
Suranjeewa; Anoj de Silva	DUNF	164	32	29	16	27	11	46	276	239	176	87	70	141	73	45	51	1,483	0.11%
K. K. Piyadasa	Ind04	216	77	237	51	183	31	32	109	83	82	154	29	37	101	44	11	1,477	0.11%
Namal; Rajapaksa	SBP	95	31	39	34	37	8	25	154	107	171	77	52	88	103	46	32	1.099	0.08%
Nuwan; Bopege	SPF	89	14	32	26	29	24	46	121	119	86	82	47	109	64	84	46	1,018	0.08%
Anuruddha; Polgampola	Ind11	87	44	146	37	107	19	23	84	73	56	87	29	40	71	36	3	942	0.07%
Sarath; Keerthirathne	Ind05	126	23	56	24	43	13	22	133	111	91	76	33	56	76	27	2	912	0.07%
Ven.Battaramulle; Seelarathana Thero	JSP	75	33	32	36	22	12	17	120	140	101	59	45	77	67	27	28	891	0.07%
Ajantha de Zoyza	RJA	84	29	49	28	56	10	25	93	84	84	62	30	49	61	26	5	775	0.06%
Priyantha; Wickremesinghe	NSSP	83	23	98	26	47	13	24	78	59	60	58	25	53	54	29	17	737	0.06%
Ven.Akmeemana; Dayarathana Thero	Ind01	77	18	48	25	53	13	78	73	72	54	42	27	31	52	17	10	690	0.05%
Keerthi; Wickremeratne	AJP	44	15	21	24	14	8	12	66	68	69	23	29	53	20	15	15	496	0.04%
Siripala; Amarasinghe	Ind02	61	15	31	15	31	9	13	54	28	48	30	14	32	44	21	3	449	0.03%
Roshan; Ranasinghe	Ind15	18	11	12	17	21	3	19	51	53	45	37	24	54	40	23	16	444	0.03%
K. R. Krishan	APP	78	7	36	9	27	5	6	50	46	37	43	14	11	34	13	1	415	0.03%
Abubakar Mohamed; Infaz	DUA	28	16	61	16	48	9	12	35	25	19	59	12	13	26	16	1	396	0.03%
Vajirapani; Wijesiriwardene	SEP	32	14	31	26	33	9	11	40	33	33	32	11	32	26	20	17	388	0.03%
Sirithunga; Jayasuriya	USP	50	13	42	28	22	6	9	54	35	29	23	14	23	22	14	4	388	0.03%
Victor; Anthony Perera	Ind10	37	14	38	8	48	9	7	25	24	23	28	4	11	32	12	0	320	0.02%
Mahinda; Dewage	SLSP	29	4	18	5	16	5	11	31	45	40	34	7	24	22	14	1	306	0.02%
Lalith; De Silva	UNFP	21	13	18	10	15	9	7	21	40	32	16	18	33	19	15	5	292	0.02%
Oshala; Herath	NIF	36	6	18	9	22	3	11	18	24	33	31	10	11	17	18	3	272	0.02%
Janaka; Ratnayake	ULPP	14	18	14	26	14	10	8	25	33	22	13	12	23	19	9	3	261	0.02%
Premasiri; Manage	Ind14	39	7	32	13	28	4	5	17	16	14	17	7	12	17	6	2	236	0.02%
Ananda; Kularatne	Ind06	19	6	11	7	9	5	2	28	24	24	24	5	14	22	10	2	212	0.02%
P. W. S. K. Bandaranayake	NDF	21	3	6	5	13	3	3	26	15	27	26	7	12	14	12	3	196	0.01%
Sidney; Jayarathna	Ind07	13	8	7	8	13	2	8	30	14	25	10	9	9	14	9	0	179	0.01%
A. S. P. Liyanage	SLLP	19	9	6	5	2	2	4	12	13	17	20	7	8	7	2	2	140	0.01%
Mylvanagam; Thilakarajah	Ind08	8	1	14	11	16	7	7	7	7	10	8	6	6	7	2	2	119	0.01%
Sarath; Manamendra	NSU	10	14	6	6	5	9	4	9	14	7	11	1	7	4	4	4	105	0.01%
Valid Votes		102,104	45,486	88,982	45,513	69,243	27,558	46,312	161,728	150,692	147,160	108,242	54,258	105,675	94,790	49,927	34,190	1,334,390	100.00%
Rejected Votes		2,385	1,078	2,522	1,215	2,276	731	1,172	3,689	3,097	3,181	2,431	1,360	2,380	1,946	1,274	1,059	31,796	2.33%
Total Polled		104,989	46,564	91,504	48,728	71,519	28,289	47,514	165,417	153,789	150,341	110,673	55,618	108,055	96,736	51,201	35,249	1,336,186	77.39%
Registered Electors		129,439	62,623	118,986	67,112	97,620	42,048	66,062	207,235	198,793	190,053	142,482	75,810	140,699	120,503	70,250	35,636	1,765,351	

Preferential votes

17,902	35,488
Anura Kumara Dissanayake	Sajith Premadasa

== Parliamentary General Elections ==
=== 1989 parliamentary general election ===
Results of the 9th parliamentary election held on 15 February 1989:

Party	Votes per Polling Division															Postal Votes	Total Votes	%	Seats
Party	Avissawella	Borella	Colombo Central	Colombo East	Colombo North	Colombo West	Dehiwala	Homagama	Kaduwela	Kesbewa	Kolonnawa	Kotte	Maharagama	Moratuwa	Ratmalana	Postal Votes	Total Votes	%	Seats
United National Party (Note: Including the Ceylon Workers' Congress.)	23,462	17,324	49,733	17,908	22,052	15,265	19,768	24,795	25,849	27,415	24,561	20,113	22,042	33,090	21,237	9,916	374,530	51.67%	12
Sri Lanka Freedom Party	4,131	8,721	11,861	8,654	5,691	4,100	12,193	14,872	21,306	25,830	18,531	17,007	11,002	22,024	13,063	6,067	205,053	28.29%	6
Mahajana Eksath Peramuna	20,225	1,040	1,326	1,620	732	669	1,724	7,920	7,241	4,351	2,698	3,030	19,152	1,859	1,407	1,972	76,966	10.62%	2
United Socialist Alliance (Note: Including the CPSL, LSSP, NSSP, SLMP.)	523	1,745	4,399	2,482	1,680	1,502	1,341	1,440	1,850	1,890	2,917	2,041	1,758	3,796	1,500	1,009	31,873	4.40%	0
Sri Lanka Muslim Congress	168	1,604	19,874	680	2,786	1,259	790	81	117	73	662	284	158	301	415	56	29,308	4.04%	0
United Lanka People's Party	1,172	254	205	363	239	247	184	1,846	485	266	161	386	671	238	217	178	7,112	0.98%	0
Valid Votes	49,681	30,688	87,398	31,707	33,180	23,042	36,000	50,954	56,848	59,825	49,530	42,861	54,783	61,308	37,839	19,198	724,842	100.00%	20
Rejected Votes	2,500	1,501	6,126	1,439	2,460	949	1,351	3,068	2,473	2,710	2,477	1,507	2,138	2,463	1,602	507	35,271		
Total Polled	52,181	32,189	93,524	33,146	35,640	23,991	37,351	54,022	59,321	62,535	52,007	44,368	56,921	63,771	39,441	19,705	760,113		
Registered Electors	67,851	47,174	131,624	49,993	53,356	36,820	52,176	82,139	86,029	87,609	74,671	65,984	81,774	95,786	54,316	20,589	1,087,891		
Turnout	76.91%	68.23%	71.05%	66.30%	66.80%	65.16%	71.59%	65.77%	68.95%	71.38%	69.65%	67.24%	69.61%	66.58%	72.61%	95.71%	69.87%		

Preferential votes
Alliance	Party	Candidate	votes
UNP	UNP	Lalith Athulathmudali (Note: Lalith Athulathmudali (DUNF) was killed on 23 April 1993.)	235,447
UNP	UNP	Sirisena Cooray	92,263
SLFP	SLFP	Stanley Tillekeratne	83,636
MEP	MEP	Dinesh Gunawardena	70,616
SLFP	SLFP	Jinadasa Niyathapala	67,804
SLFP	SLFP	C. V. Gunaratne	60,603
MEP	MEP	Bandula Gunawardane	50,861
SLFP	SLFP	Dixon Perera	50,735
UNP	UNP	Gamini Lokuge	48,790
UNP	UNP	M. H. Mohamed	47,451
UNP	UNP	Tyronne Fernando	44,718
UNP	UNP	Premaratne Gunasekera	44,559
UNP	UNP	Vincent Perera	42,776
UNP	UNP	Weerasinghe Mallimarachchi	41,508
SLFP	SLFP	Kingsley Wickramaratne	38,815
SLFP	SLFP	Nimal Siripala de Silva	38,647
UNP	UNP	Sunethra Ranasinghe	37,165
UNP	CWC	M. S. Sellasamy	36,480
UNP	UNP	Jabir Cader	30,252
UNP	UNP	Nimal Rathnasiri Peiris	27,130

=== 1994 parliamentary general election ===
Results of the 10th parliamentary election held on 16 August 1994:

Party	Votes per Polling Division															Postal Votes	Total Votes	%	Seats
Party	Avissawella	Borella	Colombo Central	Colombo East	Colombo North	Colombo West	Dehiwala	Homagama	Kaduwela	Kesbewa	Kolonnawa	Kotte	Maharagama	Moratuwa	Ratmalana	Postal Votes	Total Votes	%	Seats
People's Alliance (Note: Including the SLFP et al..)	20,782	16,764	42,060	18,211	18,140	8,977	20,882	40,034	46,899	49,342	36,939	28,106	41,034	41,670	25,967	13,835	469,642	50.94%	11
United National Party (Note: Including the Ceylon Workers' Congress.)	28,768	17,076	50,136	17,858	24,522	12,983	16,942	29,566	30,668	29,585	26,796	21,215	25,269	30,360	15,860	7,496	385,100	41.77%	9
Mahajana Eksath Peramuna	11,846	1,345	878	1,615	399	462	1,145	3,409	4,327	2,709	1,646	1,975	6,932	1,543	1,061	1,442	42,734	4.64%	0
Sri Lanka Progressive Front (Note: Including the JVP.)	476	414	502	493	268	90	327	1,180	1,541	1,418	935	742	1,142	992	666	268	11,454	1.24%	0
Independent Group 01	46	258	1,526	1,593	1,254	2,813	813	31	57	33	42	140	51	96	311	187	9,251	1.00%	0
Nava Sama Samaja Party	95	93	319	58	157	44	71	169	183	165	138	104	152	155	115	32	2,050	0.22%	0
EROS / PLOTE / TELO	73	36	130	87	96	31	44	106	94	105	71	39	89	60	50	2	1,113	0.12%	0
Democratic Workers' Congress	48	32	159	18	53	25	11	49	23	46	26	18	29	34	9	9	589	0.06%	0
Valid Votes	62,134	36,018	95,710	39,933	44,889	25,425	40,235	74,544	83,792	83,403	66,593	52,339	74,698	74,910	44,039	23,271	921,933	100.00%	20
Rejected Votes	2,882	1,524	5,995	1,618	2,593	821	1,273	2,938	3,010	2,932	2,775	1,485	2,082	2,701	1,652	354	36,635		
Total Polled	65,016	37,542	101,705	41,551	47,482	26,246	41,508	77,482	86,802	86,335	69,368	53,824	76,780	77,611	45,691	23,625	958,568		
Registered Electors	81,213	52,007	139,012	57,049	63,528	36,915	55,301	106,536	113,173	110,948	90,167	71,213	101,317	97,831	59,749		1,235,959		
Turnout	80.06%	72.19%	73.16%	72.83%	74.74%	71.10%	75.06%	72.73%	76.70%	77.82%	76.93%	75.58%	75.78%	79.33%	76.47%		77.56%		

Preferential votes
Alliance	Party	Candidate	votes
UNP	UNP	Ranil Wickremasinghe	291,194
PA	DUNF	Srimani Athulathmudali	148,727
PA	SLFP	C. V. Gunaratne (Note: C. V. Gunaratne (SLFP) was killed on 7 June 2000.)	114,756
PA	SLFP	Nimal Siripala de Silva	111,730
UNP	UNP	Ossie Abeygunasekera (Note: Ossie Abeygunasekera were killed on 24 October 1994. His replacements was P. P. Devaraj (CWC).)	98,022
PA	SLFP	Jeewan Kumaranatunga	95,767
PA	SLFP	Kingsley Wickramaratne	95,077
PA	SLFP	A. H. M. Fowzie	72,294
PA	SLFP	Benet Cooray	66,976
PA	SLFP	Bharatha Lakshman Premachandra	63,421
UNP	UNP	Susil Moonesinghe	61,610
PA	SLFP	Indika Gunawardena	58,753
PA	SLFP	Amal Senalankadikara	54,321
PA	LSSP	Bernard Soysa	50,872
UNP	UNP	Gamini Lokuge	47,058
UNP	UNP	Karunasena Kodituwakku	46,134
UNP	UNP	M. H. Mohamed	44,527
UNP	UNP	Weerasinghe Mallimarachchi (Note: Weerasinghe Mallimarachchi were killed on 24 October 1994. His replacements was R. Yogarajan (CWC).)	44,322
UNP	UNP	Tyronne Fernando	42,872
UNP	UNP	Gunasekara Premaratne	40,646

=== 2000 parliamentary general election ===
Results of the 11th parliamentary election held on 10 October 2000:

Party	Votes per Polling Division															Postal Votes	Total Votes	%	Seats
Party	Avissawella	Borella	Colombo Central	Colombo East	Colombo North	Colombo West	Dehiwala	Homagama	Kaduwela	Kesbewa	Kolonnawa	Kotte	Maharagama	Moratuwa	Ratmalana	Postal Votes	Total Votes	%	Seats
United National Party (Note: Including the DWC, NWC, UCPF, UNP.)	26,671	19,588	57,578	22,232	33,212	15,480	19,646	33,930	35,792	34,978	30,522	22,207	28,952	35,570	18,556	5,770	440,684	43.48%	10
People's Alliance (Note: Including the SLFP et al..)	33,986	14,025	20,414	13,922	13,422	4,999	14,382	41,330	43,474	41,977	32,394	20,249	36,995	36,883	17,886	7,808	394,146	38.89%	8
Janatha Vimukthi Peramuna	4,434	1,990	2,806	2,844	2,031	709	2,556	8,758	11,268	10,219	5,741	3,566	8,174	6,849	4,454	1,734	78,133	7.71%	2
Sinhala Heritage	1,086	2,106	1,683	2,939	1,043	1,418	3,200	3,283	4,701	6,211	2,604	4,881	6,302	3,721	3,356	1,137	49,671	4.73%	0
Muslim National Unity Alliance (Note: Including the SLMC.)	316	1,441	16,420	534	3,149	925	977	39	1,08	33	1,689	266	93	478	548	51	27,067	2.77%	0
All Ceylon Tamil Congress	26	136	747	927	910	1,371	622	10	11	3	16	19	9	171	210	50	5,238	0.52%	0
Ceylon Workers' Congress	832	210	1,247	411	1,099	289	122	11	12	16	205	41	3	10	59	21	4,588	0.45%	0
New Left Front (Note: Including the NSSP et al..)	369	163	378	231	282	253	194	350	279	336	204	155	252	231	154	46	3,877	0.39%	0
Citizen's; Front	72	143	1,236	169	155	91	59	97	87	99	117	120	127	201	81	25	2,879	0.28%	0
National People's Party	32	42	96	97	49	105	82	71	127	123	77	106	148	122	91	32	1,400	0.14%	0
Muslim United Liberation Front	39	54	797	30	60	15	25	50	32	56	54	16	25	22	44	2	1,321	0.13%	0
Sinhalaye Mahasammatha Bhoomiputra Pakshaya	65	37	46	52	23	22	57	101	136	200	72	87	149	57	73	51	1,228	0.12%	0
Independent Group 3	21	14	75	9	24	21	50	28	20	27	12	17	23	40	421	6	808	0.08%	0
United Lalith Front	70	22	80	27	47	15	23	95	68	50	35	28	59	31	28	6	684	0.07%	0
Liberal Party of Sri Lanka	17	29	16	35	5	88	36	19	40	40	11	33	40	31	57	0	497	0.05%	0
Socialist Equality Party	9	17	26	25	8	14	20	8	38	41	30	21	45	52	26	9	389	0.04%	0
Independent Group 2	5	56	98	15	46	8	4	11	9	11	18	27	32	7	8	2	357	0.04%	0
Democratic United National Front	30	16	24	13	17	7	14	39	32	38	26	18	32	28	16	5	355	0.04%	0
Sri Lanka Muslim Party	6	8	40	29	35	36	23	10	6	10	6	8	5	7	13	2	244	0.02%	0
Independent Group 5	15	11	19	4	9	5	4	18	14	15	14	12	17	10	12	0	179	0.02%	0
Ruhunu People's Party	6	11	16	33	3	4	2	6	7	23	7	6	6	9	4	0	143	0.01%	0
Independent Group 4	8	6	7	7	3	6	4	9	6	14	2	9	12	3	8	5	109	0.01%	0
Sri Lanka Progressive Front	2	2	49	1	6	1	4	3	5	1	5	2	2	4	2	1	90	0.01%	0
Independent Group 1	4	2	7	4	6	3	3	8	7	7	1	4	7	6	6	0	75	0.01%	0
People's Freedom Front	9	1	3	1	4	4	2	5	3	5	3	2	9	2	3	2	58	0.01%	0
Valid Votes	68,130	40,130	103,908	44,591	55,648	25,889	42,111	88,289	96,282	94,533	73,865	51,900	81,518	84,545	46,116	16,765	1,014,220	100.00%	20
Rejected Votes	3,153	1,611	5,986	1,882	3,229	1,042	1,246	3,529	3,107	2,999	2,745	1,380	2,517	2,888	1,702	408	39,424		
Total Polled	71,283	41,741	109,894	46,473	58,877	26,931	43,357	91,818	99,389	97,532	76,610	53,280	84,035	87,433	47,818	17,173	1,053,644		
Registered Electors	90,721	58,676	152,701	66,374	80,510	40,939	58,883	121,170	130,721	125,802	99,486	71,617	111,204	111,701	65,042		1,385,547		
Turnout (%)	78.57%	71.14%	71.97%	70.02%	73.13%	65.78%	73.63%	75.78%	76.03%	77.53%	77.01%	74.40%	75.57%	78.27%	73.52%		76.05%		

Preferential votes
Alliance	Party	Candidate	votes
UNP	UNP	Ranil Wickremasinghe	363,668
UNP	UNP	Ravi Karunanayake	145,593
PA	SLFP	G. L. Peiris	139,123
PA	MEP	Dinesh Gunawardena	114,795
PA	SLFP	A. H. M. Fowzie	100,200
PA	SLFP	Jeewan Kumaranatunga	88,620
PA	MEP	Bandula Gunawardane	70,537
PA	SLFP	Indika Gunawardena	70,341
UNP	UNP	M. Mahroof	65,400
PA	SLFP	Bharatha Lakshman Premachandra	62,237
PA	SLFP	Chandana Kathriarachchi	61,301
UNP	UNP	Karunasena Kodituwakku	60,318
UNP	UNP	Gamini Lokuge	58,009
UNP	UNP	M. H. Mohamed	49,239
UNP	UNP	Lilantha Perera	48,848
UNP	UNP	Tyronne Fernando	41,439
UNP	UNP	Jayantha Perera	39,242
UNP	UNP	Samson Silva	38,894
JVP	JVP	Wimal Weerawansa	13,284
JVP	JVP	Nimal Upatissa Fernando	5,717

=== 2001 parliamentary general election ===
Results of the 12th parliamentary election held on 5 December 2001:

Party	Votes per Polling Division															Postal Votes	Total Votes	%	Seats
Party	Avissawella	Borella	Colombo Central	Colombo East	Colombo North	Colombo West	Dehiwala	Homagama	Kaduwela	Kesbewa	Kolonnawa	Kotte	Maharagama	Moratuwa	Ratmalana	Postal Votes	Total Votes	%	Seats
United National Front (Note: Including the UNP, SLMC, CWC, WPF.)	32,784	24,349	80,318	26,636	41,052	18,020	24,219	39,943	43,330	42,260	37,256	27,717	35,932	42,150	23,432		546,417	51.62%	12
People's Alliance (Note: Including the SLFP et al.)	29,176	12,710	19,149	11,807	11,792	4,053	12,686	37,389	39,238	37,815	28,465	18,573	32,800	33,627	17,344		353,401	33.39%	7
Janatha Vimukthi Peramuna	7,121	2,872	3,883	3,613	3,098	926	3,786	14,159	16,602	16,045	8,869	5,275	12,776	9,932	5,750		117,404	11.09%	2
Sinhala Heritage	515	785	731	962	342	396	944	1,229	1,541	2,170	1,001	1,694	2,106	1,161	1,014		16,970	1.60%	0
Tamil National Alliance (Note: Including the ACTC, EPRLF(S), TELO, TULF.)	11	244	1,649	2,075	2,483	3,499	1,434	5	22	10	41	73	38	450	571		12,696	1.20%	0
New Left Front (Note: Including the NSSP et al.)	335	135	308	142	184	83	121	385	284	355	236	155	272	255	180		3,457	0.33%	0
Democratic Left Front	271	85	178	203	138	129	193	347	302	360	182	202	298	227	132		3,322	0.31%	0
United Socialist Party	93	64	315	101	142	43	38	92	117	97	120	46	67	111	52		1,503	0.14%	0
United Lalith Front	98	57	212	39	76	32	32	102	95	73	76	40	54	72	36		1,101	0.10%	0
Eelam People's Democratic Party	54	19	77	88	62	58	28	45	35	25	33	15	37	40	24		640	0.06%	0
Sinhalaye Mahasammatha Bhoomiputra Pakshaya	35	22	20	26	7	9	29	37	43	50	55	32	44	36	33		478	0.05%	0
Socialist Equality Party	12	14	6	12	10	9	8	22	20	21	18	16	25	31	15		239	0.02%	0
Sri Lanka Muslim Party	7	12	50	2	15	10	8	4	11	7	19	12	5	4	8		174	0.02%	0
National Development Front	14	4	9	8	6	2	8	9	19	11	7	11	8	12	9		137	0.01%	0
Independent Group 2	11	1	7	2	8	4	7	8	14	8	5	8	9	5	3		100	0.01%	0
Sri Lanka Progressive Front	7	3	15	3	15	2	1	7	5	3	5	2	7	4	2		81	0.01%	0
Independent Group 4	6	3	12	8	5	6	3	4	4	3	9	1	5	5	3		77	0.01%	0
Independent Group 1	6	3	3	6	3	2	2	5	11	8	8	3	5	10	1		76	0.01%	0
Sri Lanka National Front	1	2	12	4	5	1	3	6	9	8	4	5	5	4	2		71	0.01%	0
Ruhuna People's Party	6	3	6	5	2	2	3	6	5	8	3	4	6	5	1		65	0.01%	0
Independent Group 3	2	1	10	3	3	3	3	2	5	2	2	0	1	3	2		42	0.00%	0
Valid Votes	70,565	41,388	106,970	45,745	59,448	27,289	43,556	93,806	101,712	99,339	76,414	53,884	84,500	88,144	48,614		1,058,481	100.00%	21
Rejected Votes	3,324	1,598	5,700	1,855	3,352	959	1,448	3,725	3,218	3,356	2,761	1,698	2,608	3,294	1,664		40,901		
Total Polled	73,889	42,986	112,670	47,600	62,800	28,248	45,004	97,531	104,930	102,695	79,175	55,582	87,108	91,438	50,278		1,099,382		
Registered Electors	93,630	61,373	159,417	66,736	86,842	41,908	61,222	127,422	135,550	131,571	102,676	74,140	114,854	115,430	67,911		1,440,682		
Turnout	78.92%	70.04%	70.68%	71.33%	72.32%	67.40%	73.51%	76.54%	77.41%	78.05%	77.11%	74.97%	75.84%	79.22%	74.04%		76.31%		

Preferential votes
Alliance	Party	Candidate	votes
UNF	UNP	Ranil Wickremasinghe	415,686
UNF	UNP	Milinda Moragoda	134,132
UNF	UNP	Ravi Karunanayake	129,893
PA	SLFP	A. H. M. Fowzie	103,817
PA	SLFP	Arjuna Ranatunga	97,409
PA	SLFP	Susil Premajayanth	90,170
PA	MEP	Dinesh Gunawardena	87,615
UNF	UNP	M. Mahroof	85,988
UNF	UNP	Karunasena Kodituwakku	78,093
PA	SLFP	Jeewan Kumaranatunga	70,790
UNF	UNP	Gamini Lokuge	66,968
UNF	UNP	Bandula Gunawardane	66,516
UNF	UNP	M. H. Mohamed	64,783
PA	SLFP	Bharatha Lakshman Premachandra	61,530
PA	SLFP	Chandana Kathriarachchi	57,673
UNF	WPF	Mano Ganesan	54,942
UNF	UNP	Jayantha Ketagoda	54,274
UNF	UNP	Tyronne Fernando	46,129
UNF	UNP	Lilantha Perera	43,887
JVP	JVP	Wimal Weerawansa	19,687
JVP	JVP	Sunil Handunnetti	9,438

=== 2004 parliamentary general election ===
Results of the 13th parliamentary election held on 2 April 2004:

Party	Votes per Polling Division															Postal Votes	Total Votes	%	Seats
Party	Avissawella	Borella	Colombo Central	Colombo East	Colombo North	Colombo West	Dehiwala	Homagama	Kaduwela	Kesbewa	Kolonnawa	Kotte	Maharagama	Moratuwa	Ratmalana	Postal Votes	Total Votes	%	Seats
United National Front (Note: Including the UNP, SLMC, CWC, WPF.)	28,607	21,543	71,599	23,739	40,387	19,084	19,865	29,029	32,772	26,302	29,540	19,635	22,337	34,313	18,448	4,641	441,841	41.76%	9
United People's Freedom Alliance (Note: Including the SLFP, JVP et al.)	37,380	12,484	17,681	12,141	12,724	3,613	12,577	49,520	53,065	45,939	32,976	20,070	37,919	38,833	19,284	8,482	414,688	39.20%	8
Jathika Hela Urumaya	5,952	6,360	8,881	9,116	3,409	2,824	9,247	17,768	18,485	29,850	14,311	13,192	25,385	13,493	9,085	3,260	190,618	18.02%	3
National Development Front	96	109	230	91	415	44	63	175	202	215	194	140	177	168	86	15	2,420	0.23%	0
New Left Front (Note: Including the NSSP et al.)	133	89	225	166	175	150	112	129	139	121	106	95	135	161	71	30	2,037	0.19%	0
National People's Party	72	41	49	45	24	19	43	175	115	244	78	55	160	102	50	1	1,273	0.12%	0
United Socialist Party	71	27	204	57	93	20	30	59	53	40	74	29	32	73	31	1	894	0.08%	0
United Muslim People's Party	40	61	317	40	75	22	24	29	30	29	81	30	22	33	23	2	858	0.08%	0
Independent Group 7	1	54	501	5	42	4	10	3	3	3	40	9	0	3	5	0	683	0.06%	0
United Lalith Front	43	20	117	25	57	19	17	39	37	27	29	16	34	49	20	1	550	0.05%	0
Eelam People's Democratic Party	34	12	66	65	45	21	30	32	48	41	26	15	36	38	26	4	539	0.05%	0
Swarajya; Party	2	29	98	37	8	55	25	7	22	30	15	26	9	11	27	3	404	0.04%	0
Sinhalaye Mahasammatha Bhoomiputra Pakshaya	12	2	4	10	5	2	15	17	26	31	15	14	28	9	8	5	203	0.02%	0
Socialist Equality Party	4	11	10	11	10	5	6	6	18	18	4	7	14	24	7	4	159	0.02%	0
Independent Group 11	11	2	13	6	10	4	3	13	13	10	6	6	6	7	4	0	114	0.01%	0
Independent Group 10	9	6	13	3	8	3	2	18	6	5	6	1	6	7	5	0	98	0.01%	0
Sri Lanka Muslim Party	1	10	35	7	5	9	4	3	3	3	7	0	4	4	1	1	97	0.01%	0
Sri Lanka Progressive Front	2	4	34	1	6	0	3	2	2	6	3	1	3	4	0	0	71	0.01%	0
Independent Group 8	5	4	8	2	2	1	1	8	11	4	2	3	6	6	4	0	67	0.01%	0
Independent Group 1	1	13	3	2	2	3	2	2	5	5	2	2	2	5	0	0	49	0.00%	0
Independent Group 2	1	5	12	0	3	4	1	4	5	1	2	1	1	4	2	0	46	0.00%	0
Independent Group 4	3	3	2	3	5	3	1	4	3	4	1	2	3	3	1	2	43	0.00%	0
Sri Lanka National Front	1	1	5	1	2	1	1	3	3	6	0	3	4	6	5	0	42	0.00%	0
Independent Group 6	7	1	12	1	2	3	0	0	1	1	6	0	0	6	0	0	40	0.00%	0
Independent Group 5	4	1	5	2	3	1	1	5	2	2	1	4	0	3	2	0	36	0.00%	0
Independent Group 3	2	0	5	0	3	0	2	4	3	2	3	2	1	5	2	0	34	0.00%	0
Independent Group 9	4	0	7	0	5	0	1	2	1	3	1	0	1	3	4	0	32	0.00%	0
Ruhuna People's Party	2	1	6	0	3	0	1	5	4	0	1	1	2	3	1	0	30	0.00%	0
Valid Votes	72,500	40,893	100,142	45,576	57,528	25,914	42,087	97,061	105,077	102,942	77,530	53,359	86,327	87,376	47,202	16,452	1,057,966	100.00%	20
Rejected Votes	3,491	1,457	5,451	1,689	3,431	869	1,173	3,516	3,316	2,831	2,832	1,413	2,161	3,139	1,531	305	38,605		
Total Polled	75,991	42,350	105,593	47,265	60,959	26,783	43,260	100,577	108,393	105,773	80,362	54,772	88,488	90,515	48,733	16,757	1,096,571		
Registered Electors	98,012	62,722	153,763	67,885	86,388	40,209	60,159	135,242	143,644	137,285	106,335	74,159	118,318	116,454	67,176		1,467,751		
Turnout	77.53%	67.52%	68.67%	69.63%	70.56%	66.61%	71.91%	74.37%	75.46%	77.05%	75.57%	73.86%	74.79%	77.73%	72.55%		74.71%		

Preferential votes
Alliance	Party	Candidate	votes
UNF	UNP	Ranil Wickremasinghe	329,524
UPFA	JVP	Wimal Weerawansa	237,185
UPFA	JVP	Sunil Handunnetti	152,942
UPFA	JVP	Lakshman Nipuna Arachchi	122,645
UPFA	SLFP	Susil Premajayanth	100,074
UNF	UNP	Milinda Moragoda	99,146
UPFA	MEP	Dinesh Gunawardena	82,626
UPFA	SLFP	Arjuna Ranatunga	81,914
UNF	UNP	Ravi Karunanayake	69,975
UNF	UNP	M. H. Mohamed	62,559
UNF	UNP	T. Maheswaran (Note: T. Maheswaran (UNF-UNP) was killed on 1 January 2008. His replacement Mohamed Rajabdeen (UNF-SLMC) was sworn in on 8 January 2008.)	57,978
UNF	UNP	Bandula Gunawardane	57,460
UNF	UNP	M. Mahroof	55,919
UNF	UNP	Gamini Lokuge	53,810
UPFA	SLFP	Jeewan Kumaranatunga	51,583
UNF	WPF	Mano Ganesan	51,508
UPFA	SLFP	A. H. M. Fowzie	49,719
JHU	JHU	Ven. Uduwe Dhammaloka Thero	42,850
JHU	JHU	Ven. Kotapola Amarakitti Thero	26,539
JHU	JHU	Ven. Kataluwe Ratanasiya Thero (Note: Ven. Kataluwe Ratanasiya Thero resigned on 18 May 2004. His replacement was Ven. Akmeemana Dayarathana Thero (JHU).)	10,512

=== 2010 parliamentary general election ===
Results of the 14th parliamentary election held on 8 April 2010:

Party	Votes per Polling Division															Postal Votes	Total Votes	%	Seats
Party	Avissawella	Borella	Colombo Central	Colombo East	Colombo North	Colombo West	Dehiwala	Homagama	Kaduwela	Kesbewa	Kolonnawa	Kotte	Maharagama	Moratuwa	Ratmalana	Postal Votes	Total Votes	%	Seats
United People's Freedom Alliance (Note: SLFP, CWC et al.)	42,259	13,662	21,794	14,662	15,976	5,169	15,472	57,951	56,539	60,139	37,782	22,799	44,200	40,369	19,486	12,637	480,896	51.19%	10
United National Front (Note: UNP, SLMC, DPF, SLFP(P))	16,730	16,421	51,421	19,241	30,825	13,056	15,831	26,841	23,546	21,953	23,949	16,374	18,937	25,356	15,384	3,885	339,750	36.17%	7
Democratic National Alliance (Note: JVP, DNF et al.)	5,432	3,619	6,243	4,608	3,226	1,675	4,256	10,103	14,460	13,532	8,371	6,729	12,313	8,159	5,061	2,896	110,683	11.78%	2
United Lanka People's Party	118	90	302	82	93	39	53	121	188	180	173	73	125	92	78	21	1,828	0.19%	0
Sri Lanka National Front	15	20	24	20	102	10	7	42	231	82	50	20	60	191	37	13	924	0.10%	0
Tamil United Liberation Front	5	8	90	176	138	183	94	7	9	16	6	3	11	33	46	9	834	0.09%	0
Left Liberation Front	20	78	142	38	115	67	48	19	21	26	16	16	23	30	37	10	706	0.08%	0
National Development Front	15	106	192	23	84	5	15	20	11	12	27	5	12	23	24	4	578	0.06%	0
Our National Front	21	7	28	7	26	7	11	41	43	39	28	17	37	41	16	4	373	0.04%	0
United Socialist Party	21	21	70	38	54	13	13	9	14	17	15	12	12	20	18	5	352	0.04%	0
United National Alternative Front	19	14	51	10	44	19	11	24	18	11	20	12	9	25	4	1	292	0.03%	0
Independent Group 10	14	12	28	16	42	15	6	13	7	9	18	9	8	8	7	0	212	0.02%	0
Muslim National Alliance	9	0	28	8	11	4	5	10	10	17	12	7	6	14	6	0	147	0.02%	0
Independent Group 16	19	7	25	5	11	3	1	15	14	9	6	7	9	6	4	1	142	0.02%	0
All Are Citizens All Are Kings Organisation	19	8	35	9	2	1	5	1	10	16	8	14	4	0	5	3	140	0.01%	0
Socialist Equality Party	6	7	5	7	14	8	3	11	14	13	9	3	11	11	7	3	132	0.01%	0
Janasetha Peramuna	1	11	20	2	40	0	2	2	9	7	7	7	6	11	2	4	131	0.01%	0
United Lanka Great Council	1	6	35	2	11	0	0	2	4	7	11	6	5	31	4	1	126	0.01%	0
Independent Group 11	13	7	6	1	7	7	4	12	15	17	7	3	8	8	4	0	119	0.01%	0
Independent Group 15	6	20	25	3	3	3	2	7	9	4	5	5	8	7	7	1	115	0.01%	0
United Democratic Front	11	5	19	4	8	6	5	7	8	5	4	7	6	15	3	1	114	0.01%	0
Independent Group 12	8	10	20	2	12	1	4	11	5	9	6	4	7	6	2	0	107	0.01%	0
Independent Group 13	4	3	8	5	9	0	2	5	11	15	4	4	7	2	4	1	84	0.01%	0
Independent Group 7	2	1	0	3	9	0	0	5	11	5	5	2	4	27	1	0	75	0.01%	0
Independent Group 14	12	0	11	1	5	2	0	6	2	5	7	2	4	2	3	2	64	0.01%	0
Independent Group 8	4	3	6	2	3	0	2	4	12	5	8	4	1	8	0	1	63	0.01%	0
Independent Group 1	2	2	9	2	7	1	0	3	6	7	2	0	1	4	1	1	48	0.01%	0
Independent Group 4	2	2	15	0	5	2	2	2	3	4	3	3	0	2	0	0	45	0.00%	0
Independent Group 9	4	3	3	1	11	1	4	3	2	1	1	0	2	5	2	0	43	0.00%	0
Independent Group 2	0	1	14	3	4	1	3	1	4	1	5	0	0	0	1	0	38	0.00%	0
Sinhalaye Mahasammatha Bhoomiputra Pakshaya	1	0	1	3	3	3	2	3	2	1	5	1	5	3	2	0	35	0.00%	0
Independent Group 3	6	0	4	2	2	0	1	3	4	1	1	2	2	0	2	1	31	0.00%	0
Sri Lanka Labour Party	4	2	2	1	2	2	0	0	5	1	0	2	2	3	1	3	30	0.00%	0
National People’s Party	3	2	1	3	1	2	1	1	3	2	1	5	1	2	0	1	29	0.00%	0
Ceylon Democratic Unity Alliance	2	1	4	2	3	2	0	1	3	1	2	2	0	1	2	1	27	0.00%	0
Patriotic National Front	0	1	3	2	0	1	3	1	4	4	3	0	1	1	1	1	26	0.00%	0
Independent Group 6	0	1	4	0	1	3	0	4	0	4	2	0	0	0	0	1	20	0.00%	0
Independent Group 5	2	1	3	2	0	0	0	0	0	2	4	0	0	1	1	0	16	0.00%	0
Valid Votes	64,810	34,162	80,691	38,996	50,909	20,311	35,868	95,311	95,257	96,179	70,583	46,159	75,847	74,517	40,263	19,512	939,375	100.00%	19
Rejected Votes	4,225	1,998	6,606	2,562	4,495	1,283	1,606	4,206	4,193	4,160	3,863	1,877	3,014	3,725	1,990	551	50,354		
Total Polled	69,035	36,160	87,297	41,558	55,404	21,594	37,474	99,517	99,450	100,339	74,446	48,036	78,861	78,242	42,253	20,063	989,729		
Registered Electors	108,138	58,757	139,822	68,643	95,385	38,921	61,194	155,720	158,736	148,696	112,363	73,009	121,247	114,601	66,622		1,521,854		
Turnout	63.84%	61.54%	62.43%	60.54%	58.08%	55.48%	61.24%	63.91%	62.65%	67.48%	66.25%	65.79%	65.04%	68.27%	63.42%		65.03%		

Preferential votes
Alliance	Party	Candidate	votes
UPFA	NFF	Wimal Weerawansa	280,672
UNF	UNP	Ranil Wickremasinghe	232,957
UPFA	SLFP	Duminda Silva	146,336
UPFA	JHU	Champika Ranawaka	120,333
UPFA	MEP	Dinesh Gunawardena	116,860
DNA	DNA	Sarath Fonseka (Note: Sarath Fonseka (DNA) vacated his seat on 7 October 2010 after being sentenced to 30 months imprisonment by a court martial after being found guilty of breaching arms procurement guideline. His replacement Jayantha Ketagoda (DNA) was sworn in on 8 March 2011.)	98,458
DNA	JVP	Sunil Handunnetti	78,126
UNF	UNP	Ravi Karunanayake	70,328
UNF	UNP	Mohan Lal Grero	68,008
UNF	UNP	Rosy Senanayake	66,357
UPFA	UNP	Bandula Gunawardane	64,654
UPFA	SLFP	Thilanga Sumathipala	60,848
UNF	UNP	Wijeyadasa Rajapaksa	60,030
UPFA	SLFP	Susil Premajayanth	54,702
UNF	UNP	Sujeewa Senasinghe	52,559
UPFA	SLFP	A. H. M. Fowzie	51,641
UPFA	SLFP	Jeewan Kumaranatunga	51,080
UPFA	UNP	Gamini Lokuge	49,750
UNF	DPF	Praba Ganesan	42,851

=== 2015 parliamentary general election ===
Results of the 15th parliamentary election held on 17 August 2015:

Party	Votes per Polling Division															Postal Votes	Total Votes	%	Seats
Party	Avissawella	Borella	Colombo Central	Colombo East	Colombo North	Colombo West	Dehiwala	Homagama	Kaduwela	Kesbewa	Kolonnawa	Kotte	Maharagama	Moratuwa	Ratmalana	Postal Votes	Total Votes	%	Seats
United National Front for Good Governance (Note: The alliance consisted of ACMC, DNM, JHU, MTNA, NFGG, SLMC, TPA (DPF, NUW and UCPF), ULF and UNP.)	39,106	28,968	79,968	31,450	50,571	22,060	28,153	52,336	56,154	49,637	49,196	30,247	41,374	43,665	26,412	11,446	640,743	53.00%	11
United People's Freedom Alliance (Note: The alliance consisted of CWC, CF, DNF, DPC, LBSL, MEP, NC, NFF, PHU, SA (CPSL, DLF, LSSP, NLPP and SLPP), SLFP, TMVP and UCF.)	42,895	11,842	11,489	12,917	10,256	4,204	13,273	66,450	62,136	65,243	35,300	20,797	47,049	40,142	19,203	10,867	474,063	39.21%	7
Janatha Vimukthi Peramuna	4,346	2,282	2,109	2,960	1,647	875	2,366	10,719	11,971	11,193	6,159	4,075	9,001	5,384	3,217	3,087	81,391	6.73%	1
Democratic Party	172	284	209	238	121	71	204	678	564	580	293	327	584	420	214	279	5,238	0.43%	0
Bodu Jana Peramuna	86	100	68	169	45	36	94	207	199	224	229	147	207	134	138	54	2,137	0.18%	0
Tamil United Liberation Front	28	23	86	99	162	112	44	1	16	7	58	8	6	36	17	20	723	0.06%	0
Our National Front	50	13	19	11	17	4	16	71	63	71	30	23	42	39	25	3	497	0.04%	0
Frontline Socialist Party	56	9	9	21	23	3	19	41	46	59	26	16	72	17	24	22	463	0.04%	0
United Socialist Party	22	31	78	21	64	10	13	20	31	31	39	20	10	19	16	4	429	0.04%	0
United People's Party	28	23	63	23	49	11	16	31	41	19	31	21	21	20	16	9	422	0.03%	0
Independent Group 01	3	54	89	26	81	11	3	4	3	9	22	25	2	3	3	1	339	0.03%	0
Nava Sama Samaja Party	10	11	105	8	18	28	19	10	10	8	8	11	9	18	28	2	303	0.03%	0
Jana Setha Peramuna	12	26	25	14	3	3	5	24	52	24	30	25	31	17	1	4	296	0.02%	0
Independent Group 12	5	7	7	14	6	7	10	9	52	18	48	27	34	26	15	1	286	0.02%	0
Independent Group 11	20	10	36	9	29	8	5	9	19	19	15	6	8	9	8	1	211	0.02%	0
Independent Group 09	5	10	13	14	5	16	2	3	24	5	5	20	14	4	6	3	149	0.01%	0
Independent Group 10	4	2	8	18	12	51	9	3	2	4	5	3	2	8	5	4	140	0.01%	0
Independent Group 15	9	8	11	3	18	5	4	15	11	7	15	7	7	4	9	4	137	0.01%	
United Peace Front	11	2	4	3	4	4	2	27	19	12	10	5	6	15	7	3	134	0.01%	0
Socialist Equality Party	5	4	4	8	2	5	4	10	9	19	7	2	21	16	8	1	125	0.01%	0
All Lanka Tamil Great Council	5	4	21	6	17	5	6	7	6	3	9	5	3	3	2	2	104	0.01%	0
United Lanka People's Party	3	0	7	6	2	2	0	8	20	15	7	2	1	6	3	0	82	0.01%	0
Independent Group 08	4	4	13	5	10	1	1	2	5	1	4	1	3	3	2	0	59	0.00%	0
Independent Group 14	1	1	9	2	7	3	1	8	1	5	3	3	6	2	5	0	57	0.00%	0
Motherland People's Party	2	3	1	2	2	0	4	13	2	4	3	5	3	5	2	4	55	0.00%	0
Independent Group 02	3	2	6	2	6	0	1	0	7	2	4	6	8	3	1	1	52	0.00%	0
Sri Lanka Vanguard Party	2	0	0	1	1	1	1	5	6	6	4	3	15	2	0	2	49	0.00%	0
Independent Group 05	4	0	2	2	5	0	4	10	5	1	3	0	0	4	2	0	42	0.00%	0
New Sinhala Heritage	1	2	0	0	2	0	0	5	4	5	3	2	3	5	0	1	33	0.00%	0
Independent Group 03	2	1	7	0	1	0	2	2	4	0	0	1	0	0	3	1	24	0.00%	0
Liberal Party of Sri Lanka	1	2	2	1	4	1	5	1	1	1	1	2	0	1	0	0	23	0.00%	0
Independent Group 13	2	3	1	0	1	0	0	2	4	3	1	0	1	4	1	0	23	0.00%	0
Independent Group 07	1	0	1	2	1	1	1	1	2	2	4	0	1	3	0	0	20	0.00%	0
Independent Group 06	0	2	4	1	1	0	1	2	0	1	2	0	1	3	1	0	19	0.00%	0
Independent Group 04	2	2	2	0	0	0	0	3	3	1	2	0	1	0	0	1	17	0.00%	0
Sri Lanka National Force	2	1	1	0	0	0	1	3	1	1	0	1	2	1	0	0	14	0.00%	0
Valid Votes	89,908	43,736	94,477	48,056	63,193	27,538	44,289	130,740	131,493	127,240	91,576	55,843	98,548	90,041	49,394	25,827	1,208,899	100.00%	19
Rejected Votes	7,044	1,902	5,332	2,043	4,055	1,237	1,330	4,026	3,536	3,452	3,283	1,457	2,492	2,990	1,634	559	43,372	3.46%	
Total Polled	90,952	45,638	99,809	50,099	67,248	28,775	45,619	134,766	135,029	130,692	94,859	57,300	101,040	93,031	51,028	26,386	1,252,271	78.93%	
Registered Electors	117,472	60,109	131,482	66,941	89,771	40,609	59,812	174,909	173,355	164,774	120,617	74,934	129,801	115,219	66,793		1,586,598		

Preferential votes
Alliance	Party	Candidate	votes
UNFGG	UNP	Ranil Wickremesinghe	500,566
UPFA	NFF	Wimal Weerawansa	313,801
UPFA	PHU	Udaya Gammanpila	198,818
UPFA	SLFP	Susil Premajayantha	174,075
UPFA	MEP	Dinesh Gunawardena	124,451
UNFGG	UNP	Sujeewa Senasinghe	117,049
UNFGG	UNP	Harsha de Silva	114,147
UNFGG	UNP	Ravi Karunanayake	111,399
UNFGG	JHU	Champika Ranawaka	100,444
UPFA	SLFP	Bandula Gunawardena	96,057
UNFGG	UNP	S. M. Marikar	92,526
UNFGG	UNP	Mujibur Rahman	83,884
UNFGG	UNP	Eran Wickramaratne	82,737
UNFGG	UNP	Wijeyadasa Rajapakshe	81,758
UNFGG	SLFP	Hirunika Premachandra	70,584
UNFGG	DPF	Mano Ganeshan	69,064
JVP	JVP	Anura Kumara Dissanayake	65,966
UPFA	SLFP	Mohan Lal Grero	65,703
UPFA	SLFP	Gamini Lokuge	58,527

=== 2020 parliamentary general election ===
Results of the 16th parliamentary election held on 5 August 2020:

Party	Votes per Polling Division															Postal Votes	Total Votes	%	Seats
Party	Avissawella	Borella	Colombo Central	Colombo East	Colombo North	Colombo West	Dehiwala	Homagama	Kaduwela	Kesbewa	Kolonnawa	Kotte	Maharagama	Moratuwa	Ratmalana	Postal Votes	Total Votes	%	Seats
Sri Lanka People's Freedom Alliance (Note: The alliance consisted of CWC, CPSL, DLF, DVJP, EPDP, LSSP, MEP, MTK, NC, NFF, PHU, SLFP, SLMP, SLPP, TMVP, UPP & VDJS.)	58,477	17,680	16,688	18,007	16,775	6,294	18,244	95,118	90,489	89,240	49,742	29,436	64,309	55,000	25,320	23,784	647,687	57.04%	12
Samagi Jana Balawegaya (Note: The alliance consisted of JHU, SLMC, TPA (NUW, DPF, UCPF), ACMC, NLNP & JSP.)	20,308	20,450	64,692	20,538	41,059	16,521	18,611	23,184	23,793	23,687	36,718	14,946	17,733	23,747	15,646	5,512	387,145	32.73%	6
National People's Power (Note: Including JVP.)	3,761	1,931	1,912	2,595	1,230	1,074	2,094	8,712	9,594	9,160	4,655	3,405	7,371	4,404	2,901	2,801	67,600	5.72%	1
United National Party	1,712	1,500	2,978	1,869	2,676	1,143	1,706	2,476	2,679	2,098	2,091	1,563	2,128	1,754	1,440	1,062	30,875	2.61%	0
National Development Front	188	61	111	103	112	40	140	334	228	216	182	119	162	188	120	39	2,343	0.2%	0
Independent Group 07	97	66	48	104	46	58	103	158	201	213	82	204	263	143	120	15	1,921	0.16%	0
Independent Group 17	214	37	37	42	63	13	30	232	206	223	160	58	96	139	67	10	1,627	0.14%	0
Independent Group 02	116	31	181	47	88	19	35	105	94	67	114	46	57	106	83	15	1,204	0.1%	0
Independent Group 19	129	69	166	47	148	23	23	106	73	73	127	44	33	78	34	8	1,181	0.1%	0
Frontline Socialist Party	102	20	23	23	54	13	41	143	131	127	54	40	148	43	57	66	1,085	0.09%	0
Independent Group 08	57	43	177	38	136	27	41	50	38	38	95	25	23	67	35	6	896	0.08%	0
National People's Party	41	20	23	199	17	14	39	62	74	71	47	57	72	96	28	24	884	0.07%	0
Liberal Party of Sri Lanka	52	18	29	25	20	17	23	96	116	99	49	39	103	70	29	15	800	0.07%	0
Independent Group 10	20	5	56	23	60	11	11	66	39	49	46	30	227	19	10	26	698	0.06%	0
United Left Front	58	27	70	31	72	11	20	61	57	51	55	17	48	65	23	12	678	0.06%	0
Independent Group 11	41	33	161	38	82	4	15	35	37	40	55	14	21	62	12	2	652	0.06%	0
Socialist Party of Sri Lanka	54	17	31	35	40	13	28	77	65	55	57	27	45	52	37	9	642	0.05%	0
Independent Group 13	83	26	92	27	85	21	14	34	48	32	59	10	29	36	21	1	618	0.05%	0
Independent Group 15	103	17	29	18	23	4	11	82	65	46	50	12	26	64	29	4	583	0.04%	0
Sinhaladeepa National Front	16	13	9	8	6	4	6	81	190	34	28	11	59	15	11	24	515	0.04%	0
Independent Group 24	75	25	30	9	15	1	5	52	28	24	130	12	25	8	33	10	482	0.04%	0
Democratic United National Front	14	22	13	17	12	3	3	13	42	25	219	12	14	34	7	21	471	0.04%	0
Independent Group 05	29	18	94	13	94	9	7	29	31	20	38	14	17	31	13	6	463	0.04%	0
Jana Setha Peramuna	18	22	30	11	22	9	51	26	53	30	45	17	39	21	13	14	421	0.04%	0
Independent Group 01	10	4	20	53	34	60	14	19	27	34	9	21	22	34	18	17	396	0.03%	0
United Socialist Party	31	9	40	21	45	7	14	25	25	27	33	10	22	23	7	3	342	0.03%	0
Independent Group 03	30	16	28	13	9	3	11	32	41	47	16	17	25	33	10	2	323	0.03%	0
Independent Group 25	16	19	78	10	11	6	3	16	8	18	46	7	2	21	47	2	310	0.03%	0
Socialist Equality Party	15	10	29	24	20	9	12	23	33	27	32	8	21	20	15	5	303	0.03%	0
Independent Group 04	26	19	72	11	30	5	10	24	21	13	17	6	18	13	7	8	300	0.03%	0
Independent Group 26	20	20	30	7	14	2	5	25	50	34	22	9	33	15	4	7	297	0.03%	0
New Sinhala Heritage	21	21	12	19	11	4	6	22	35	23	36	27	25	6	16	10	294	0.02%	0
Independent Group 09	6	8	5	8	15	12	16	29	29	30	6	4	24	47	44	8	291	0.02%	0
Independent Group 20	12	11	55	14	29	13	5	16	14	19	32	9	13	23	6	4	275	0.02%	0
Independent Group 06	31	14	26	9	31	2	9	29	17	22	26	8	15	16	8	2	265	0.02%	0
Independent Group 21	26	6	23	7	10	6	10	26	25	26	16	5	16	27	5	6	240	0.02%	0
Independent Group 12	10	11	13	11	27	6	6	22	14	12	43	4	6	15	10	5	215	0.02%	0
Independent Group 22	21	5	10	5	7	5	2	28	22	19	7	8	5	10	10	4	168	0.01%	0
Independent Group 18	25	3	8	3	16	3	2	19	14	15	13	5	11	6	2	5	150	0.01%	0
Independent Group 14	8	3	5	5	14	0	1	12	9	6	9	3	3	5	2	1	86	0.01%	0
Independent Group 16	7	3	6	3	3	0	6	22	7	5	4	1	2	7	1	2	78	0.01%	0
Independent Group 23	1	2	3	2	2	0	2	5	8	8	7	3	6	7	0	0	56	0.00%	0
Valid Votes	86,081	43,335	88,143	44,092	63,263	25,489	41,434	131,726	128,770	126,103	95,272	50,313	93,317	86,560	46,301	33,577	1,182,776	100.00%	19
Rejected Votes	6,907	3,537	8,955	3,371	7,113	1,545	2,529	8,032	6,845	6,760	6,870	2,789	4,931	5,895	3,254	1,701	81,034	4.74%	
Total Polled	92,988	45,872	97,098	47,463	70,376	27,034	43,963	139,758	135,615	132,863	102,142	53,102	98,248	92,455	49,555	35,278	1,263,810	73.98%	
Registered Electors	122,257	61,897	126,022	67,241	93,672	41,831	62,406	191,627	188,469	179,289	136,028	75,197	136,304	119,911	70,528	36,530	1,709,209		

Preferential votes
Alliance	Party	Candidate	votes
SLPFA	SLPP	Sarath Weerasekara	328,092
SJB	SJB	Sajith Premadasa	305,744
SLPFA	NFF	Wimal Weerawansa	267,084
SLPFA	PHU	Udaya Gammanpila	136,331
SLPFA	SLPP	Wijeyadasa Rajapakshe	120,626
SLPFA	SLPP	Bandula Gunawardena	101,644
SJB	SJB	S. M. Marikkar	96,916
SLPFA	SLPP	Pradeep Undugoda	91,958
SJB	SJB	Mujibur Rahman	87,589
SLPFA	MEP	Dinesh Gunawardena	85,287
SJB	SJB	Harsha de Silva	82,845
SLPFA	SLPP	Madhura Withanage	70,205
SLPFA	SLPP	Premnath C. Dolawaththa	69,055
SJB	JHU	Patali Champika Ranawaka	65,574
SLPFA	SLPP	Gamini Lokuge	62,543
SJB	DPF	Mano Ganeshan	62,091
SLPFA	SLPP	Susil Premajayantha	50,321
NPP	JVP	Anura Kumara Dissanayake	49,814
SLPFA	SLPP	Jagath Kumara	47,693

=== 2024 parliamentary general election ===
Preferential votes – 2024 Colombo District
Alliance	Party	Candidate	Votes
NPP	JVP	Harini Amarasuriya	655,289
SJB	SJB	Sajith Premadasa	145,611
NPP	JVP	Chathuranga Abeysinghe	127,166
NPP	JVP	Sunil Watagala	125,700
NPP	JVP	Lakshman Nipuna Arachchi	96,273
NPP	JVP	Aruna Panagoda	91,081
NPP	JVP	Eranga Gunasekara	85,180
NPP	JVP	Harshana Nanayakkara	82,275
SJB	SJB	Harsha de Silva	81,473
NPP	JVP	Kaushalya Ariyarathne	80,814
NPP	JVP	Asitha Niroshana	78,990
NPP	JVP	Rizvie Salih	73,018
NPP	JVP	Susantha Dodawatta	65,391
NPP	JVP	Chandana Sooriyaarachchi	63,387
NPP	JVP	Samanmalee Gunasinghe	59,657
NPP	JVP	Dewananda Suraweera	54,680
SJB	SJB	Mujibur Rahman	43,737
SJB	SJB	S. M. Marikkar	41,482

== Provincial Council Elections ==
=== 1988 provincial council election ===
Results of the 1st Western provincial council election held on 2 June 1988

Party	Total Votes	%	Seats
United National Party	265,845	53.45%	23
United Socialist Alliance (Note: Including the CPSL, LSSP, NSSP & SLMP)	190,116	38.23%	17
Sri Lanka Muslim Congress	37,598	7.56%	3
Liberal Party of Sri Lanka	3,781	0.76%	0
Valid Votes	497,340	100.00%	43

=== 1993 provincial council election ===
Results of the 2nd Western provincial council election held on 17 May 1993:

Party	Votes	%	Seats
People's Alliance (Note: Including the SLFP et al.)	307,471	38.14%	17
United National Party	303,179	37.59%	16
Democratic United National Front	176,511	21.87%	10
Nava Sama Samaja Party	6,983	0.87%	0
Sri Lanka Muslim Congress	4,854	0.6%	0
Democratic Workers Congress	2,624	0.33%	0
Independent Group 02	2,495	0.31%	0
Independent Group 01	2,290	0.29%	0
Valid Votes	806,487	100.00%	43

=== 1999 provincial council election ===
Results of the 3rd Western provincial council election held on 6 April 1999:

Party	Votes per Polling Division															Postal Votes	Total Votes	%	Seats
Party	Avissawella	Borella	Colombo Central	Colombo East	Colombo North	Colombo West	Dehiwala	Homagama	Kaduwela	Kesbewa	Kolonnawa	Kotte	Maharagama	Moratuwa	Ratmalana	Postal Votes	Total Votes	%	Seats
United National Party	23,077	18,534	50,132	19,492	26,448	12,348	15,548	28,150	28,065	26,785	25,989	16,956	22,576	31,232	14,971	2,333	362,336	45.07%	19
People's Alliance (Note: Including the SLFP, SLMC et al.)	21,057	11,230	24,182	11,979	11,483	4,659	13,416	30,493	30,989	35,377	24,217	19,351	27,843	28,688	15,373	3,259	313,576	38.98%	17
Janatha Vimukthi Peramuna	2,800	1,736	2,457	1,997	1,734	490	1,751	5,576	8,066	7,257	4,777	2,543	4,869	5,430	3,535	363	55,361	6.88%	3
Mahajana Eksath Peramuna	9,055	619	765	891	518	413	1,234	3,915	6,471	3,375	2,187	2,289	7,433	2,004	1,287	552	43,008	5.35%	2
National Union of Workers (Note: Including the CWC, DWC.)	1,088	330	4,654	650	3,897	812	231	45	84	51	331	113	40	80	96	8	12,510	1.55%	1
New Left Front (Note: Including the NSSP et al.)	505	324	1,080	886	864	1,007	558	567	520	580	416	333	484	547	445	24	9,140	1.14%	1
Muslim United Liberation Front	76	122	3,896	48	243	55	60	58	78	80	169	42	53	60	45	2	5,087	0.63%	0
Liberal Party of Sri Lanka	56	57	90	117	74	148	102	70	63	78	51	103	91	152	148	1	1,411	0.18%	0
Independent Group 01	16	41	284	44	625	84	39	15	30	17	56	9	20	24	12	10	1,326	0.16%	0
Sri Lanka Progressive Front	22	7	27	17	15	8	12	70	40	35	21	49	72	43	56	1	495	0.06%	0
Valid Votes	57,762	33,000	87,567	36,121	45,881	20,024	32,951	68,959	74,406	73,635	58,214	41,786	63,461	68,260	35,968	6,553	804,550	100.00%	43
Rejected Votes	3,676	1,976	6,738	2,303	3,539	1,308	1,835	4,440	4,174	4,491	3,674	2,385	3,794	3,525	2,231	366	50,435	5.9%	
Total Polled	61,438	34,976	94,305	38,424	49,420	21,332	34,786	73,339	78,580	28,126	66,888	44,153	67,255	71,785	38,199	6,919	854,985	64.45%	
Registered Electors	86,614	55,841	144,202	64,542	75,761	40,640	58,766	113,810	123,171	120,054	94,877	70,405	107,710	106,359	63,735		1,326,487		

Preferential votes
Party	Candidate	votes
UNP	Karu Jayasuriya	250,179
PA	Susil Premajayantha	162,415
UNP	Lilantha Perera	39,670
UNP	Jayantha Perera	39,096
MEP	Bandula Gunawardane	31,984
PA	Gamini Thilakasiri	31,975
PA	Chandana Kathirarachchi	30,429
PA	Navusar Fauzi	29,837
UNP	Hameed Mohomad	29,384
PA	Hector Bethgamage	28,894
UNP	Samson Silva	28,392
UNP	Ajith Nivard Cabraal	27,990
UNP	Jayantha de Silva	27,352
PA	Ashoka Lankathilaka	26,174
PA	Renuka Dushyantha Perera	25,291
UNP	Janaka Malimaarachchi	24,734
UNP	Laxman Abegunaratne	24,163
UNP	Thompson Joseph Mendis	22,414
UNP	Almon Pieris	22,264
PA	Mahesh Jayathissa	22,172
PA	Upali Kodikara	21,812
PA	Wirantha Fernando	21,426
PA	Sunil Jayamini	21,374
UNP	Nimal Rathnasiri Pieris	20,750
PA	Ananda Wasantha	20,271
UNP	Ratnasiri Rajapakse	20,179
UNP	Mohomed Ishfahani	19,568
UNP	Senaka Damyantha de Silva	19,376
PA	Susantha Sirinatha	19,032
UNP	Premasiri Perera	18,946
UNP	Mohomed Nawfer	18,666
PA	Thilakaratna Rajapaksa	17,701
UNP	Chandrasiri Dias	17,626
UNP	Joseph Charles	17,263
PA	Isura Devapriya	16,099
PA	Ranjith Mahinda	15,893
PA	Terrance Balasooriya	15,419
MEP	Lionel Kariyawasam	7,924
JVP	Dharmadasa Perera	5,423
JVP	Aruna Panagoda	4,057
JVP	Sanath Weerakon	3,932
NLF	Vikramabahu Karunaratne	3,755
NUW	Mano Ganeshan	3,663

=== 2004 provincial council election ===
Results of the 4th Western provincial council election held on 10 July 2004:

Party	Votes per Polling Division															Postal Votes	Total Votes	%	Seats
Party	Avissawella	Borella	Colombo Central	Colombo East	Colombo North	Colombo West	Dehiwala	Homagama	Kaduwela	Kesbewa	Kolonnawa	Kotte	Maharagama	Moratuwa	Ratmalana	Postal Votes	Total Votes	%	Seats
United People's Freedom Alliance (Note: Including SLFP, JVP et al.)	29,534	8,968	14,580	9,372	9,615	2,632	10,374	35,610	40,785	38,289	25,690	16,436	31,251	30,382	14,621	4,514	322,653	49.11%	21
United National Party (Note: Including CWC, UNP.)	18,113	15,020	35,680	14,251	23,661	7,622	10,850	20,694	20,364	21,088	20,889	12,758	16,794	25,453	11,369	2,153	276,759	42.12%	18
Sri Lanka Muslim Congress	413	1,524	18,727	578	4,209	975	554	54	142	43	2,716	480	62	352	336	19	31,184	4.75%	2
Western People's Front	400	688	3,282	1,423	3,637	997	308	15	77	10	703	266	11	237	155	10	12,219	1.86%	1
Democratic Unity Alliance	61	586	2,882	263	667	332	337	62	103	62	273	92	55	278	151	15	6,219	0.95%	1
New Left Front (Note: Including NSSP et al.)	185	297	447	168	247	218	106	229	111	174	207	165	145	202	98	25	3,024	0.46%	0
Sinhalaye Mahasammatha Bhoomiputra Pakshaya	81	79	74	87	38	22	93	152	191	275	386	202	221	134	96	63	2,194	0.33%	0
National Development Front	75	70	85	46	217	20	26	100	126	115	94	65	82	172	42	2	1,337	0.20%	0
United Lalith Front	63	33	144	33	69	11	20	59	42	69	56	41	36	52	37	6	771	0.12%	0
United Sinhala Great Council	16	11	27	17	12	1	17	19	24	33	17	18	21	16	17	10	276	0.04%	0
Independent Group 01	19	8	29	15	10	3	5	19	15	29	11	12	25	22	18	11	251	0.04%	0
Sri Lanka National Front	7	4	28	5	15	4	3	2	4	10	8	4	9	6	3	1	113	0.02%	0
Valid Votes	48,967	27,288	75,985	26,258	42,397	12,837	22,693	57,015	61,984	60,197	51,050	30,539	48,712	57,306	26,943	6,829	657,000	100.00%	43
Rejected Votes	3,022	1,753	4,952	1,809	2,696	694	1,508	3,789	3,936	4,749	3,694	2,191	3,979	3,590	1,989	653	45,004		
Total Polled	51,989	29,041	80,937	28,067	45,093	13,531	24,201	60,804	65,920	64,946	54,744	32,730	52,691	60,896	28,932	7,482	702,004		
Registered Electors	98,012	62,722	153,763	67,885	86,388	40,209	60,159	135,242	143,644	137,285	106,335	74,159	118,318	116,454	67,176		1,467,751		
Turnout	53.04%	46.30%	52.64%	41.34%	52.20%	33.65%	40.23%	44.96%	45.89%	47.31%	51.48%	44.13%	44.53%	52.29%	43.07%		47.83%		

Preferential votes
Party	Candidate	votes
UNP	Duminda Silva	56,569
UPFA	Anura Hemapala	36,029
UPFA	Gamini Thilakasiri	34,992
UNP	Jayantha de Silva	34,776
UPFA	Kanchana Peiris	34,658
UPFA	Hector Bethmage	31,924
UPFA	Sunil Watagala	31,836
UNP	Luxman Abeygunarathna	30,945
UPFA	Priyanga Kothalawala	30,876
UNP	Mohan Lal Grero	30,436
UPFA	G. H. Buddhadasa	29,682
UPFA	Sarath Pathirana	29,375
UPFA	Sunil Jayamini	29,082
UNP	Ajantha Niroshan Padukka	28,104
UPFA	Mahesh Almeida	26,886
UNP	Nimal Rathnasiri Peiris	26,851
UPFA	Navusar Fauzi	25,085
UPFA	Wasantha Malini	24,727
UPFA	Upali Kodikara	22,786
UPFA	Chandrasiri Karunaratne	22,588
UPFA	Thilakarathne Rajapaksha	22,026
UNP	Prince Sagara Senaratne	21,547
UPFA	Mohomed Nafli	21,012
UPFA	Sumith De Zoysa	20,967
UNP	Senaka Damayantha de Silva	20,927
UPFA	Murugan Mohan	20,909
UPFA	Ashoka Lankathilaka	20,293
UNP	Krishantha Yogadas Pancharathnam	20,281
UNP	Hameed Mohomed	20,146
UPFA	Keerthi Udawatta	19,598
UNP	Joseph Mendis	19,434
UPFA	Isura Devapriya	18,898
UNP	Harischandra de Kostha	17,798
UNP	Sujeewa Senasinghe	17,405
UNP	Kithsiri Fernando	16,796
UNP	Janaka Mallimarachchi	16,349
UNP	Sunil Magammana	16,265
UNP	Mohamad Fairoz	15,588
UNP	Welamma Sellasami	14,382
SLMC	Mohamed Rajabdeen	11,625
SLMC	Hassan Mohideen	6,562
WPF	Praba Ganesan	6,459
DUA	A. J. M. Muzammil	1,904

=== 2009 provincial council election ===
Results of the 5th Western provincial council election held on 25 April 2009:

Party	Votes per Polling Division															Postal Votes	Total Votes	%	Seats
Party	Avissawella	Borella	Colombo Central	Colombo East	Colombo North	Colombo West	Dehiwala	Homagama	Kaduwela	Kesbewa	Kolonnawa	Kotte	Maharagama	Moratuwa	Ratmalana	Postal Votes	Total Votes	%	Seats
United People's Freedom Alliance (Note: Including SLFP et al.)	45,368	14,950	25,505	16,890	15,746	5,483	17,377	61,542	66,362	65,459	42,086	26,902	52,439	45,787	22,560	5,914	530,370	57.78%	25
United National Party	17,984	16,994	45,414	18,922	27,866	12,244	14,612	28,355	24,219	22,933	22,932	14,819	18,350	25,873	14,201	1,853	327,571	35.69%	15
Janatha Vimukthi Peramuna	1,405	587	507	1,061	387	152	551	2,792	3,084	3,331	1,341	1,080	2,331	1,713	1,114	351	21,787	2.37%	1
Sri Lanka Muslim Congress	130	894	9,023	506	3,332	796	770	17	160	34	2,352	306	45	138	462	13	18,978	2.07%	1
Democratic Unity Alliance	64	158	2,350	356	4,267	159	160	49	83	50	468	88	72	70	185	5	8,584	0.94%	1
Left; Front (Note: Including NSSP et al.)	53	153	564	646	675	816	363	41	42	74	73	51	61	205	170	10	3,997	0.44%	0
United National Alliance	86	56	196	77	111	50	43	87	100	103	103	52	59	81	38	5	1,247	0.14%	0
Independent Group 05	12	39	265	159	359	50	21	21	7	12	69	31	20	8	12	0	1,085	0.12%	0
Independent Group 03	5	16	316	8	140	11	13	14	6	5	30	11	2	1	5	0	583	0.06%	0
New Sinhala Heritage	58	22	40	17	130	9	7	42	48	24	7	21	62	25	8	6	526	0.06%	0
Ruhuna People's Party	4	14	48	24	35	9	34	31	13	20	38	15	29	32	176	1	523	0.06%	0
Independent Group 06	9	30	120	43	93	43	22	16	5	1	85	2	6	7	1	0	483	0.05%	0
Independent Group 11	4	72	174	11	67	5	10	7	4	4	72	12	5	14	16	1	478	0.05%	0
United Socialist Party	20	13	64	37	38	7	11	19	26	17	23	15	22	21	20	2	355	0.04%	0
Independent Group 01	9	30	32	33	16	1	1	45	37	22	54	6	16	9	6	1	318	0.03%	0
Socialist Equality Party	16	4	15	16	9	11	11	13	15	20	9	4	18	15	5	0	181	0.02%	0
Independent Group 10	10	2	8	7	11	2	3	9	14	10	12	8	24	4	0	0	124	0.01%	0
United Lanka People's Party	10	8	25	2	20	2	5	4	6	5	2	5	3	5	2	0	104	0.01%	0
United Lanka Great Council	1	5	9	6	5	2	0	8	5	16	3	3	14	0	2	0	79	0.01%	0
Independent Group 13	9	6	11	2	4	4	4	2	6	7	4	2	4	7	4	1	77	0.01%	0
Sinhalaye Mahasammatha Bhoomiputra Pakshaya	2	4	2	2	3	3	6	6	6	5	2	8	7	6	4	1	67	0.01%	0
Sri Lanka Progressive Front	0	3	25	0	7	3	3	0	5	2	8	3	3	2	1	0	65	0.01%	0
Independent Group 12	7	2	5	3	6	0	6	3	7	4	8	2	1	4	2	0	60	0.01%	0
National People's Party	4	5	0	1	1	0	1	8	7	4	4	1	6	3	1	0	46	0.01%	0
Independent Group 02	1	2	8	3	3	1	2	7	7	2	2	2	2	2	0	0	44	0.00%	0
Independent Group 08	1	0	3	5	2	0	3	1	7	2	1	6	3	2	5	2	43	0.00%	0
Independent Group 04	3	1	8	2	5	3	1	6	0	3	3	1	2	2	0	0	40	0.00%	0
Patriotic National Front	4	2	5	1	2	3	2	0	5	1	1	1	2	3	2	1	35	0.00%	0
Independent Group 09	8	1	3	1	0	1	0	1	4	3	1	2	2	5	1	1	34	0.00%	0
Independent Group 07	1	0	8	0	6	1	3	2	1	2	0	2	1	3	1	0	31	0.00%	0
Valid Votes	65,288	34,073	84,753	38,841	53,346	19,871	34,045	93,148	94,291	92,175	69,793	43,461	73,611	74,047	39,004	8,168	917,915	100.00%	43
Rejected Votes	3,497	1,421	5,272	1,920	3,666	1,160	1,190	3,718	2,922	3,351	2,987	1,412	2,253	2,571	1,501	279	39,120		
Total Polled	68,785	35,494	90,025	40,761	57,012	21,031	35,235	96,866	97,213	95,526	72,780	44,873	75,864	76,618	40,505	8,447	957,035		
Registered Electors	107,093	63,884	151,308	72,446	103,050	41,441	63,115	154,055	159,596	149,191	114,105	75,555	122,895	115,042	67,817		1,560,593		
Turnout	64.23%	55.56%	59.50%	56.26%	55.32%	50.75%	55.83%	62.88%	60.91%	64.03%	63.78%	59.39%	61.73%	66.60%	59.73%		61.33%		

Preferential votes
Party	Candidate	votes
UPFA	Duminda Silva	165,128
UPFA	Thilanga Sumathipala	159,603
UPFA	Udaya Gammanpila	116,144
UNP	Rosy Senanayake	80,884
UPFA	Pradeep Undugoda	62,736
UNP	Mohan Lal Grero	59,056
UPFA	Roger Seneviratne	52,390
UPFA	Gamini Thilakasiri	49,471
UNP	Sujeewa Senasinghe	45,958
UNP	Praba Ganesan	45,899
UNP	Sudath Manju Sri	37,878
UPFA	Sunil Jayamini	39,769
UPFA	Navusar Fauzi	39,417
UPFA	Hector Bethmage	37,890
UPFA	Salochana Gamage	35,693
UPFA	Sarath Kumara Sumanasekara	34,373
UNP	Hashan Tillakaratne	32,799
UNP	A. J. M. Muzammil	31,202
UNP	Nalliah Kumaraguruparan	30,373
UNP	Jayantha De Silva	29,560
UPFA	Mahesh Jayathissa	29,259
UPFA	Upali Kodikara	29,215
UPFA	Isura Devapriya	29,043
UPFA	Janaka Deepal Waliwaththe	28,466
UPFA	Ashoka Lankathilaka	26,973
UPFA	Sumith De Zoysa	26,919
UNP	Krishantha Yogadas Pancharathnam	26,460
UNP	Mohomed Fairoz	26,353
UNP	Mohomed Muin	24,272
UNP	S. Rajendran	24,096
UNP	Ajantha Niroshan Padukka	23,501
UNP	Srinath Perera	21,880
UPFA	Moris Wijerathna	21,091
UPFA	Amal Puspakumara Silva	20,639
UPFA	Ranjith Mahinda	20,345
UPFA	Thilakarathne Rajapaksha	20,337
UPFA	Keerthi Udawatta	19,907
UPFA	Renuka Dushyantha Perera	19,384
UPFA	Jagath Kumara	19,309
UPFA	Gamini De Silva	19,048
SLMC	Arshad Mohamed	5,789
DUA	Abdul Faiz	2,538
JVP	Duminda Nagamuwa	2,388

=== 2014 provincial council election ===
Results of the 6th Western provincial council election held on 29 March 2014:

Party	Votes per Polling Division															Postal Votes	Total Votes	%	Seats
Party	Avissawella	Borella	Colombo Central	Colombo East	Colombo North	Colombo West	Dehiwala	Homagama	Kaduwela	Kesbewa	Kolonnawa	Kotte	Maharagama	Moratuwa	Ratmalana	Postal Votes	Total Votes	%	Seats
United People's Freedom Alliance (Note: Including SLFP et al.)	42,635	11,750	17,472	12,806	10,873	4,783	12,361	53,983	58,259	55,372	35,813	20,217	42,883	38,305	17,396	8,175	443,083	45.33%	18
United National Party	15,363	15,302	40,170	13,092	16,165	7,073	11,629	32,890	20,713	27,499	22,072	10,970	14,666	24,366	11,347	2,221	285,538	29.21%	12
Janatha Vimukthi Peramuna	4,092	2,908	2,126	3,088	1,214	769	2,196	9,127	10,659	9,807	6,112	4,201	8,504	4,848	3,621	1,165	74,437	7.62%	3
Democratic Party	4,297	1,787	2,166	2,496	1,488	1,098	3,301	6,194	10,182	7,427	5,637	5,024	9,115	5,956	3,887	1,470	71,525	7.32%	3
Democratic People's Front	1,790	1,764	8,854	5,643	12,795	5,703	2,639	37	83	57	2,371	434	102	706	1,096	82	44,156	4.52%	2
Sri Lanka Muslim Congress	199	999	8,629	538	4,174	801	710	26	138	36	2,403	629	53	307	505	16	20,163	2.06%	1
All Ceylon Makkal Congress	185	888	4,480	404	6,111	574	700	62	98	90	1,037	180	88	159	418	17	15,491	1.58%	1
Independent Group 01	476	402	1,244	191	2,633	21	15	13	32	29	396	149	17	14	12	11	5,655	0.58%	0
Ceylon Workers' Congress	473	171	883	289	1,295	342	91	21	31	16	124	52	16	20	52	9	3,885	0.40%	0
Independent Group 03	28	129	219	703	77	21	74	56	107	112	186	115	93	29	88	16	2,053	0.21%	0
Independent Group 02	37	9	16	60	11	3	254	223	172	304	38	82	143	256	148	8	1,764	0.18%	0
United Lanka People's Party	60	38	116	63	93	19	24	123	94	126	74	25	281	118	19	10	1,283	0.13%	0
Independent Group 10	13	145	367	243	159	27	8	7	7	10	92	75	13	13	31	1	1,211	0.12%	0
Nava Sama Samaja Party	29	73	170	106	104	95	54	38	47	59	70	29	58	40	82	7	1,061	0.11%	0
Independent Group 06	95	27	68	35	47	22	52	81	110	86	88	62	100	93	73	15	1,054	0.11%	0
New Democratic Front	41	32	61	55	70	30	43	74	111	105	70	75	97	56	45	81	1,046	0.11%	0
Jana Setha Peramuna	17	24	33	36	15	14	21	98	226	73	184	38	102	49	23	14	967	0.10%	0
Patriotic National Front	59	44	80	30	169	4	18	40	72	49	55	38	58	42	31	8	797	0.08%	0
Independent Group 11	31	26	60	20	28	9	10	35	31	29	35	12	16	30	16	3	391	0.04%	0
Our National Front	21	6	19	11	16	10	8	18	53	31	31	19	45	25	9	8	330	0.03%	0
United Peace Front	11	13	64	8	39	3	4	19	18	20	35	20	18	9	10	1	292	0.03%	0
Independent Group 09	16	21	44	10	22	2	7	22	20	13	30	12	10	22	8	1	260	0.03%	0
United Lanka Great Council	17	7	31	30	4	5	10	25	26	21	21	11	16	19	10	3	256	0.03%	0
Socialist Equality Party	12	10	10	10	29	4	7	18	21	24	16	12	26	13	6	2	220	0.02%	0
Sri Lanka Labour Party	30	8	16	8	5	11	2	2	4	5	5	2	7	6	4	5	120	0.01%	0
Independent Group 04	8	2	12	6	9	1	9	8	9	9	3	9	4	8	9	2	108	0.01%	0
Independent Group 07	4	6	8	1	10	7	2	7	12	13	7	7	8	9	6	1	108	0.01%	0
Independent Group 08	4		14	5	5	4	3	12	7	14	5	4	3	13	6	0	99	0.01%	0
Independent Group 05	9	1	12	4	4		1	4	11	9	5	1	5	3	4	0	73	0.01%	0
Valid Votes	70,052	36,592	87,444	39,991	57,664	21,455	34,253	103,263	101,353	101,445	77,015	42,504	76,547	75,534	38,962	13,352	977,426	100.00%	40
Rejected Votes	3,837	1,610	4,066	1,998	3,363	1,019	1,487	4,078	4,342	4,072	3,526	1,729	3,044	3,123	1,787	681	43,762		
Total Polled	73,889	38,202	91,510	41,989	61,027	22,474	35,740	107,341	105,695	105,517	80,541	44,233	79,591	78,657	40,749	14,033	1,021,188		
Registered Electors	115,098	57,373	130,186	66,572	87,542	39,625	60,543	169,679	168,043	160,493	118,098	73,539	127,060	113,257	65,626		1,552,734		
Turnout	64.20%	66.59%	70.29%	63.07%	69.71%	56.72%	59.03%	63.26%	62.90%	65.75%	68.20%	60.15%	62.64%	69.45%	62.09%		65.77%		

Preferential votes
Party	Candidate	votes
UPFA	Hirunika Premachandra	139,034
UPFA	Udaya Gammanpila	115,637
UNP	S. M. Marikkar	67,243
UPFA	Upali Kodikara	47,822
UNP	Sudath Manju Sri	45,654
JVP	K. D. Lalkantha	45,460
UPFA	Roger Seneviratne	44,011
UPFA	Malsha Kumaranatunga	43,324
UNP	Mujibur Rahman	42,126
UPFA	Rasika Buddhadasa	37,125
UNP	Ajantha Niroshan Padukka	33,846
UPFA	Salochana Gamage	33,495
DP	Susil Kindelpitiya	32,918
UNP	Loshan Karunarathne	32,911
UNP	Mohomed Fairoz	32,642
UPFA	Gamini Thilakasiri	31,532
UPFA	Mahesh Jayatissa	30,191
UPFA	Jagath Kumara	29,499
UPFA	Hector Bethmage	28,766
DPF	Mano Ganesan	28,558
UNP	Srinath Perera	27,942
UPFA	Janaka Deepal Weliwatta	27,578
UPFA	Isura Devapriya	26,164
UPFA	Pradeep Undugoda	26,031
UPFA	Gayan Sriwarnasinghe	24,942
UNP	Jayantha De Silva	24,450
UPFA	Amal Pushpakumara Silva	24,431
UPFA	Sunil Jayamini	23,832
UNP	Senaka Damayantha de Silva	23,586
UPFA	Thushara Perera	23,423
UNP	Anuradha Wimalarathna	21,205
UNP	Udara Rathnayake	20,165
UNP	Rodney Fraser	19,643
DPF	S. Kuhawaradan	14,888
DP	Nimal Rathnasiri Peiris	14,822
DP	Nalin Pradeep Udawela	13,653
JVP	Lakshman Nipuna Arachchi	9,528
JVP	Sunil Watagala	8,380
SLMC	Mohamed Nizamdeen	5,694
ACMC	Mohemed Faiz	4,208
