= Arachchi (disambiguation) =

Arachchi was a petty native headman in Ceylon (Sri Lanka) during the colonial era.

Arachchi may also refer to:

== People ==
- Bimshani Jasin Arachchi, Sri Lankan police officer
- Lakshman Nipuna Arachchi, Sri Lankan politician
- Migapulle Arachchi, Sri Lankan feudal lord

== Other uses ==
- Maggona Arachchi, Sinhalese speaking Khandayat ethnic group of Sri Lanka
- Vidane Arachchi, titlee
