= Udaya Gammanpila =

Sri Lankan politician, current Prime Minister of Sri Lanka

Hon. Udaya Gammanpila
- උදය ගම්මන්පිල உதய கம்மன்பில
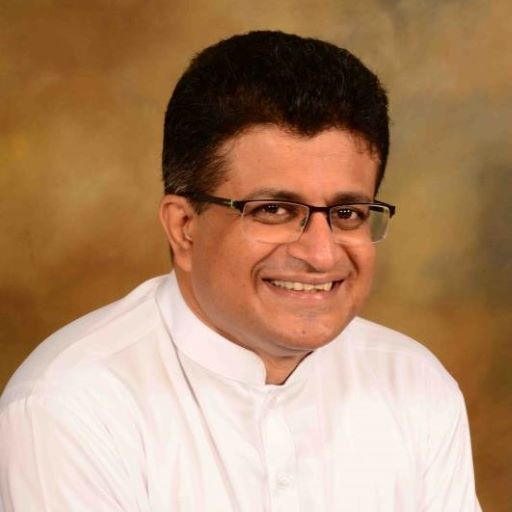

Minister of Energy
- In office 12 August 2020 – 3 March 2022
- President: Gotabaya Rajapaksa
- Prime Minister: Mahinda Rajapaksa
- Preceded by: Mahinda Amaraweera (Note: As Minister of Power and Energy)
- Succeeded by: Gamini Lokuge

Minister of Buddha Sasana and Religious Affairs
- In office 9 November 2018 – 15 December 2018
- President: Maithripala Sirisena
- Prime Minister: Mahinda Rajapaksa
- Preceded by: Gamini Jayawickrama Perera (Note: As Minister of Buddha Sasana)
- Succeeded by: Gamini Jayawickrama Perera (Note: As Minister of Buddha Sasana and Wayamba Development)

Minister of Agriculture, Irrigation, Industries and Environment, Western Province
- In office 2009–2014
- Governor: Alavi Moulana
- Chief Minister: Prasanna Ranatunga

Member of Parliament for Colombo District
- In office 1 September 2015 – 24 September 2024

Member of the Western Provincial Council for Colombo District
- In office 2009–2015

Personal details
- Born: Udaya Prabath Gammanpila; 6 February 1970 (age 56) Nawalapitiya, Sri Lanka
- Party: Pivithuru Hela Urumaya
- Other political affiliations: Sarvajana Balaya; Sri Lanka People's Freedom Alliance (2019 – 2022); United People's Freedom Alliance (2009 – 2019)
- Education: D. S. Senanayake College; Monash University; Sri Lanka Law College
- Profession: Lawyer, University Lecturer
- Website: udayagammanpila.com

Udaya Prabath Gammanpila (born 6 February 1970) is a Sri Lankan nationalist politician. By profession, he is a lawyer and a politician. He is a former Minister of Energy and Member of Sri Lanka Parliament for Colombo District.

He has also worked as the former minister in the Western province and carried out the ministerial portfolio as the government's Cabinet minister for Buddhism and Religious affairs. He was elected as a Member of Parliament with 198,818 preferential votes from the Colombo District at the General Election held on 17 August 2015. He is also the leader of the Pivithuru Hela Urumaya political party.

== Early life and education ==
Udaya Gammanpila was born at Nawalapitiya on 6 February 1970. He attended D. S. Senanayake College, Colombo for his secondary education, where he passed the GCE A/L examination in 1988 and won a scholarship from the Australian government to study for a degree in computer science at Monash University. In 1993, while in his fourth year, he was appointed as an assistant lecturer at the university. Upon his return to Sri Lanka in 1994, he joined the Australia-Lanka Group as an Apprentice Manager and two years later became the Director and CEO of the group. Gammanpila, studied law at the Sri Lanka Law College, passed the law examination in 2003 and was sworn in as a lawyer.

== Early political life ==
Gammanpila entered politics in 2000 as a founding member of the Sinhala nationalist political party, Sihala Urumaya. Gammanpila was appointed as the party's propaganda secretary in 2001 and later became its deputy general secretary. In 2007, he was appointed as the chairman of the Central Environmental Authority by the President Mahinda Rajapaksa. Gammanpila also served as a member of the All-Party Representatives Committee appointed by the President to resolve the North-East crisis in August of that year. In 2009, he voluntarily resigned as chairman of the Central Environmental Authority to contest for the Western Provincial Council. He was elected and sworn in as the Minister of Agriculture, Irrigation, Industries and Environment of the Western Province.

== Milestones ==
=== Chairman Central Environment Authority ===
Gammanpila was appointed as the Chairman of the Central Environmental Authority in 2007, where he implemented the Pilisaru Waste Management Project and the Fuel Generation of Plastic Waste project.

=== Minister of Agriculture, Irrigation, Industries and Environment (Western Province) ===
He served as the Minister of Agriculture under the Goviriya Aruna program, aimed at increasing the productivity of agriculture through mechanisation of agriculture, resulting in the Ministry being awarded the ISO 9001-2008 certification by the Sri Lanka Standards Institution in 2013.

=== Member of parliament ===
Gammanpila contested the 2015 parliamentary election from the United People's Freedom Alliance (UPFA), receiving 198,818 preferential votes in his first parliamentary election.

== Electoral history ==
Electoral history of Udaya Gammanpila
Election	Constituency	Party	Alliance	Votes	Result
2009 provincial	Colombo District	JHU	UPFA	116,144	Elected
2014 provincial	Colombo District	JHU	UPFA	115,637	Elected
2015 parliamentary	Colombo District	PHU	UPFA	198,818	Elected
2020 parliamentary	Colombo District	PHU	SLPFA	136,331	Elected
2024 parliamentary	Colombo District	PHU	Sarvajana Balaya		Not elected

== Author and editor ==
Since 2002 Gammanpila has been a frequent contributor to newspapers and has published weekly columns for Lankadeepa in Sinhala under the name “Pradeepa” in Sinhala and from 2012, Ceylon Today in English as Guard Post. His latest book is Mahinda Sulagin Gotabhishekayata, which features the behind-the-scenes story of Gotabhaya Rajapaksa entry into politics and power.
