= Madhura Withanage =

Sri Lankan politician

Hon. Madhura Withanage MP
- මධුර විතානගේ மதுர விதானகே

Member of Parliament for Colombo District
- Incumbent
- Assumed office 20 August 2020

Mayor of Sri Jayawardenepura Kotte
- In office April 2018 – August 2020

Personal details
- Party: Sri Lanka Podujana Peramuna
- Other political affiliations: Sri Lanka People's Freedom Alliance

Madhura Withanage is a Sri Lankan politician and a member of the Sri Lankan parliament from Colombo Electoral District as a member of the Sri Lanka Podujana Peramuna. He was the former mayor of Sri Jayawardenepura Kotte. He was appointed as the Chairman the Selection Committee of Parliament to Study the practical problems and difficulties that have arisen in relation to enhancing the rank in the Ease of Doing Business Index in Sri Lanka and make its proposals and recommendations.

He plays a key role in the other critical Sri Lankan Parliamentary Committees, notably The Committee on Public Finance and the Committee on Public Enterprises (COPE)
