= Pradeep Undugoda =

Sri Lankan politician

Hon. Pradeep Undugoda
- ප්‍රදීප් උඳුගොඩ பிரதீப் உண்டுகொட

Member of the Parliament of Sri Lanka
- Incumbent
- Assumed office 2020
- Constituency: Colombo District

Member of the Western Provincial Council
- In office 2009–2019
- Constituency: Colombo District

Personal details
- Born: Pradeep Saman Kumara Undugoda Rupasinghage; 29 June 1971 (age 55)
- Party: Sri Lanka Podujana Peramuna
- Other political affiliations: Sri Lanka People's Freedom Alliance
- Education: General Sir John Kotelawala Defence University; University of Moratuwa

Military service
- Allegiance: Sri Lanka
- Branch/service: Sri Lanka Army
- Rank: Major
- Unit: Sri Lanka Light Infantry

Pradeep Saman Kumara Undugoda Rupasinghage (born 29 June 1971) is a former Sri Lankan army officer, politician, former provincial councillor and Member of Parliament.

Undugoda was born on 29 June 1971. He was educated at Ananda College. He studied at General Sir John Kotelawala Defence University and has a postgraduate degree from the University of Moratuwa. He is studying for a PhD degree from the National University of Malaysia. He served in the Sri Lanka Light Infantry.

Undugoda was a member of the Western Provincial Council. He contested the 2020 parliamentary election as a Sri Lanka People's Freedom Alliance electoral alliance candidate in Colombo District and was elected to the Parliament of Sri Lanka.

Electoral history of Pradeep Undugoda
| Election | Constituency | Party | Alliance | Votes | Result |
|---|---|---|---|---|---|
| 2009 provincial | Colombo District | | United People's Freedom Alliance | 62,736 | Elected |
| 2014 provincial | Colombo District | | United People's Freedom Alliance | 26,031 | Elected |
| 2020 parliamentary | Colombo District | Sri Lanka Podujana Peramuna | Sri Lanka People's Freedom Alliance | 91,958 | Elected |
