= Jagath Kumara =

Sri Lankan politician

Hon. Jagath Kumara MP
- ජගත් කුමාර ஜகத் குமார

Colombo District
- Incumbent
- Assumed office 2020

Personal details
- Party: Sri Lanka Podujana Peramuna
- Other political affiliations: Sri Lanka People's Freedom Alliance

Jagath Kumara is a Sri Lankan politician and a member of the Sri Lankan parliament from Colombo Electoral District as a member of the Sri Lanka Podujana Peramuna.
