= Dewananda Suraweera =

Sri Lankan politician

Hon. Dewananda Suraweera MP
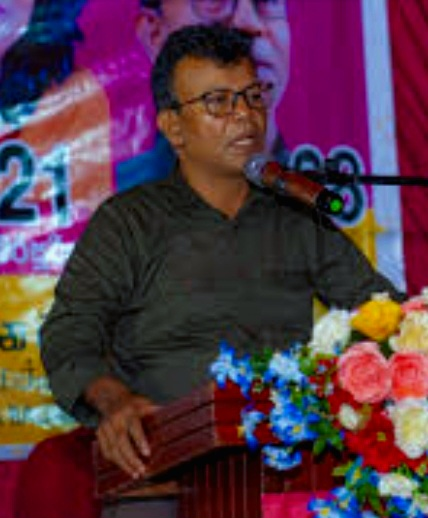
- Dewananda Suraweera at a public gathering in 2024

Member of Parliament for Colombo Electoral District
- Incumbent
- Assumed office 15 November 2024

Personal details
- Born: May 10, 1970 (age 55) Kottawa, Sri Lanka
- Citizenship: Sri Lankan
- Party: National People's Power
- Education: Sri Jayawardanepura University
- Profession: Politician
- Website: https://www.facebook.com/DewanandaSuraweeraSL

Dewananda Suraweera is a Sri Lankan politician. He was elected to the Sri Lankan Parliament from Colombo Electoral District as a member of the National People's Power in 2024. He assumed office after receiving 54,680 votes getting the 15th place and seat in the Maharagama seat.
