= Chandana Sooriyaarachchi =

Sri Lankan politician (born 1976)

Hon. Chandana Sooriyaarachchi MP

Member of Parliament for Colombo Electoral District
- Incumbent
- Assumed office 15 November 2024

Personal details
- Born: 5 April 1976 (age 50)
- Party: National People's Power
- Profession: Politician

Chandana Sooriyaarachchi (born 5 April 1976) is a Sri Lankan politician. He was elected to the Sri Lankan Parliament from Colombo Electoral District as a member of the National People's Power.

== Controversy ==
Sooriyaarachchi was arrested by Sri Lanka Police on 8 October 2026 on suspicion of injuring a pedestrian in a traffic accident in Panagoda. He was subsequently released on bail by the Homagama Magistrate's Court.
