= Asitha Niroshana =

Sri Lankan politician

Hon. Asitha Niroshana MP

Member of Parliament for Colombo Electoral District
- Incumbent
- Assumed office 21 November 2024

Personal details
- Party: National People's Power
- Profession: Politician

Asitha Niroshana is a Sri Lankan politician. He was elected to the Sri Lankan Parliament from Colombo Electoral District as a member of the National People's Power.
