= Kotapola Amarakitti Thera =

Sri Lankan Buddhist monk and politician

Hon. Kotapola Amarakitti

Member of Parliament for Colombo District
- In office 2004–2010

Personal details
- Born: 2 February 1949 (age 77)
- Party: Jathika Hela Urumaya
- Other political affiliations: United People's Freedom Alliance
- Occupation: Buddhist monk

Kotapola Amarakitti Thera (born 2 February 1949) is a Sri Lankan Buddhist monk and politician. He was a representative of Colombo for Jathika Hela Urumaya in the Parliament of Sri Lanka.
