= N. Kumaraguruparan =

Sri Lankan politician

Honourable N. Kumaraguruparan MPC MMC
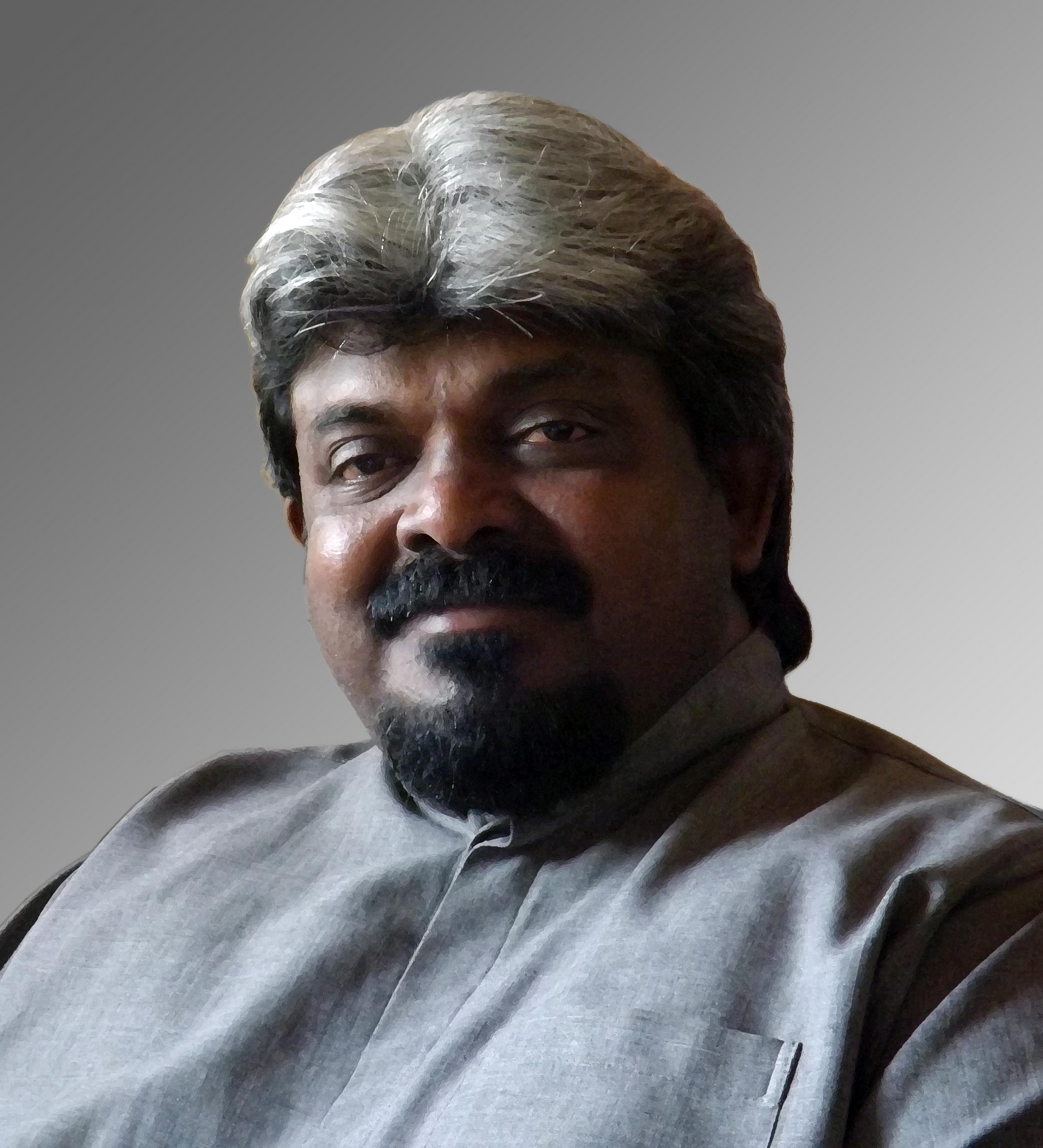

Member of the Western Provincial Council for Colombo District
- In office 2009–2014

Member of Colombo Municipal Council
- In office 2006–2009

Personal details
- Party: Democratic National Front
- Other political affiliations: United People's Freedom Alliance
- Occupation: Accountant
- Ethnicity: Sri Lankan Tamil

Nalliah Kumaraguruparan (Tamil: நல்லையா குமரகுருபரன்; Sinhala: නල්ලය්යා කුමරගුරුපරන්) is a Sri Lankan Tamil accountant, politician and former provincial councillor. He is leader of the Democratic National Front.

== Career ==
Kumaraguruparan was one of the All Ceylon Tamil Congress's (ACTC) candidates in Jaffna District at the 1989 parliamentary election but the ACTC failed to win any seats in Parliament. He contested the 1994 parliamentary election as part of an independent group in Colombo District but the group failed to win any seats in Parliament.

Kumaraguruparan was elected general-secretary of the ACTC in January 2000. He was later senior deputy president of the party.

Kumaraguruparan joined the Western People's Front (WPF) in May 2004. He contested the 2004 provincial election as one of the WPF's candidates in Colombo District but failed to get elected after coming third amongst the WPF candidates. He contested the 2006 local government election as a WPF candidate and was elected to Colombo Municipal Council. Kumaraguruparan served as general-secretary of the WPF.

Kumaraguruparan contested the 2009 provincial council election as one of the United National Front's (UNF) candidates in Colombo District and was elected to the Western Provincial Council. He contested the 2010 parliamentary election as one of the UNF's candidates in Colombo District but failed to get elected after coming tenth amongst the UNF candidates. He contested the 2014 provincial election as one of the Democratic People's Front's (DPF) candidates in Colombo District but failed to get re-elected. Shortly afterwards Kumaraguruparan fell out with the DPF leadership and was expelled from the party.

Kumaraguruparan then founded a party called Democratic National Front. He contested the 2015 parliamentary election as one of the United People's Freedom Alliance's (UPFA) candidates in Colombo District but failed to get elected after coming 19th amongst the UPFA candidates.

== Electoral history ==
Electoral history of N. Kumaraguruparan
Election	Constituency	Party	Votes	Result
1989 parliamentary	Jaffna District	ACTC	538	Not elected
1994 parliamentary	Colombo District	Ind		Not elected
2004 provincial	Colombo District	WPF	1,940	Not elected
2006 local	Colombo MC	WPF		Elected
2009 provincial	Colombo District	UNF	30,373	Elected
2010 parliamentary	Colombo District	UNF	34,205	Not elected
2014 provincial	Colombo District	DPF		Not elected
2015 parliamentary	Colombo District	UPFA	5,128	Not elected
