= Sunil Watagala =

Member of Parliament of Sri Lanka

Hon. Sunil TikaLaw Watagala MP
- සුනිල් වටගල சுனில் வடகல

Member of Parliament for Colombo District
- Incumbent
- Assumed office 21 November 2024
- Majority: 125,700 Preferential votes

Personal details
- Party: National People's Power
- Education: Faculty of Law, University of Colombo
- Occupation: Attorney-at-law, Politician
- Profession: Attorney-at-law

Sunil Watagala is a Sri Lankan politician and a member of the Parliament of Sri Lanka, representing the Colombo Electoral District since 2024 as a member of the National People's Power. In the newly formed government, he serves as the Deputy Minister of Public Security and Parliamentary Affairs, contributing to key areas of governance and public security.

In addition to his political career, Watagala is an Attorney-at-Law of the Supreme Court of Sri Lanka. With a background in law, he has been actively engaged in promoting human rights, social equity, and legal empowerment, both as a legal professional and as a public servant.

== Early life and education ==
Sunil Watagala was born on 16 December 1967. He received his primary and secondary education at C.W.W. Kannangara Central College, Mathugama, where he developed an early interest in law and social justice.

He subsequently attended the Faculty of Law at the University of Colombo, obtaining a Bachelor of Laws (LL.B.) degree in 1994. Following his undergraduate studies, Watagala pursued his legal training at Sri Lanka Law College and qualified as an Attorney-at-Law of the Supreme Court of Sri Lanka in 1996.

Throughout his academic career, he maintained a strong interest in human rights, social equity, and legal empowerment, which laid the foundation for his subsequent work as a legal professional and public servant.

== Political career ==
Sunil Watagala began his political career in 1983 by joining the Janatha Vimukthi Peramuna (JVP) while studying for his Advanced Level examinations. In 1994, he contested the parliamentary election representing the Kalutara District.

After being admitted as an Attorney-at-Law in 1996, he focused on legal advocacy, representing the party in various legal matters and handling numerous high-profile fundamental rights cases, driven by a strong commitment to justice and public service.

His engagement in public service continued through his roles in the Colombo Municipal Council and the Western Provincial Council, representing the JVP.

At the 2024 Sri Lankan general election, Watagala contested for Parliament from the Colombo District as a candidate of the National People's Power and was elected in November 2024. Subsequently, on 21 November 2024, he was sworn in as the Deputy Minister of Public Security and Parliamentary Affairs.

== Electoral history ==
Electoral history of
Election	Constituency	Party	Aliiance	Votes	Result	Ref
2004 provincial council	Colombo District	Janatha Vimukthi Peramuna	United People's Freedom Alliance	31,836	Elected	
2014 provincial council	Colombo District	Janatha Vimukthi Peramuna		8,380	Elected	
2015 parliamentary	Colombo District	Janatha Vimukthi Peramuna		12,332	Not elected	
2020 parliamentary	Colombo District	Janatha Vimukthi Peramuna	National People's Power	7,392	Not elected	
2024 parliamentary	Colombo District	Janatha Vimukthi Peramuna	National People's Power	125,700	Elected	
