= Eranga Gunasekara =

Sri Lankan politician

Eranga Gunasekara is a Sri Lankan politician. He was elected to the Sri Lankan Parliament from Colombo Electoral District as a member of the National People's Power.
