= S. M. Marikkar =

Sri Lankan politician

Hon. S. M. Marikkar MP
- එස්. එම්. මරික්කාර් சைதுல்லா மரிக்கார்

Member of Parliament for Colombo District
- Incumbent
- Assumed office 2015

Personal details
- Born: Saidulla Musthajab Marikkar; 12 January 1977 (age 49)
- Party: Samagi Jana Balawegaya (since 2020)
- Other political affiliations: United National Party (before 2020)
- Occupation: Journalist

Saidulla Musthajab Marikkar, commonly known as S. M. Marikkar, (born 12 January 1977) is a Sri Lankan politician and current member of Parliament for the Colombo District. He previously served as a provincial councilor for the Western Province. Marikkar was an electorate organiser for Kolonnawa in the 2015 presidential campaign of NDF candidate Maithripala Sirisena.
