= Socialist Alliance (Sri Lanka) =

Socialist Alliance සමාජවාදී ජනතා පෙරමුණ
- Secretary-General: Raja Collure
- Founded: 2006; 19 years ago
- Preceded by: United Socialist Alliance
- National affiliation: Sri Lanka People's Freedom Alliance
- Parliament: 0 / 225

Election symbol
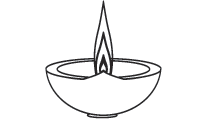
- Clay lamp

The Socialist Alliance was a political alliance and registered political party in Sri Lanka. It was founded in 2006 by five left-wing political parties: the Communist Party of Sri Lanka, Democratic Left Front, Desha Vimukthi Janatha Pakshaya, Lanka Sama Samaja Party and Sri Lanka Mahajana Pakshaya.

The Socialist Alliance was aligned the United People's Freedom Alliance (UPFA), and later the Sri Lanka People's Freedom Alliance. Raja Collure served as the secretary-general of the party.
