= Kaushalya Ariyarathne =

Sri Lankan politician

Hon. Kaushalya Ariyarathne MP

Deputy Minister of Mass Media
- Incumbent
- Assumed office 10 October 2025
- President: Anura Kumara Dissanayake
- Prime Minister: Harini Amarasuriya
- Preceded by: Hansaka Wijemuni

Member of Parliament for Colombo District
- Incumbent
- Assumed office 21 November 2024

Personal details
- Party: National People's Power
- Profession: Researcher Lawyer Lecturer

Kaushalya Ariyarathne is a Sri Lankan politician. She was elected to the Sri Lankan Parliament from Colombo Electoral District as a member of the National People's Power.
