= Sujeewa Senasinghe =

Sri Lankan lawyer and politician

Hon. Sujeewa Senasinghe MP

Minister of Science, Technology and Research
- In office 10 September 2015 – 21 November 2019
- President: Maithripala Sirisena
- Prime Minister: Ranil Wickremesinghe

Deputy Minister of Justice
- In office 12 January 2015 – 17 August 2015
- President: Maithripala Sirisena
- Prime Minister: Ranil Wickremesinghe

Member of Parliament for National List
- Incumbent
- Assumed office 17 December 2024

Member of Parliament for Colombo District
- In office 2010–2020

Personal details
- Born: sujeewa senasinghe 13 December 1971 (age 54)
- Party: Samagi Jana Balawegaya
- Other political affiliations: United National Party
- Education: Trinity College, Sri Lanka Law College
- Occupation: lawyer, politician
- Profession: Attorney-at-Law,

Sujeewa Senasinghe (Sinhala: සුජීව සේනසිංහ; born 13 December 1971) is a Sri Lankan lawyer and politician. He is a member of the Parliament of Sri Lanka and the State Minister for International Trade until 2019.

== Early life and education ==
Senasinghe was born in Kandy, the son of Stanley Senasinghe, a senior lawyer in Kandy and Upamalika Senasinghe, a lecturer. He is the youngest of three brothers; his brothers are Namal and Chaminda. Sujeewa was educated at Trinity College, Kandy and at the Sri Lanka Law College.

== Political career ==
Sujeewa obtained 117,049 preferential votes from the Colombo district at the General Elections held on 17 August 2015. This was the second highest number of preferential votes obtained by a United National Party member from the Colombo district.

He was appointed Deputy Minister of Justice on 12 January 2015 under 100 Days Program. He belongs to the United National Party.

In 2017 he was appointed State Minister of Trade and Investment and in 2019 the Non-Cabinet Minister of Science and Technology, under Prime Minister Ranil Wickramasinghe.

On 28 September 2020, Sujeewa decided to step down from politics after the defeat in 2020 Sri Lankan parliamentary election and losing his seat.

He was appointed as a Member of Parliament for National List in 2024 Sri Lankan parliamentary election as a member of the Samagi Jana Balawegaya.
