= Samanmalee Gunasinghe =

Sri Lankan politician

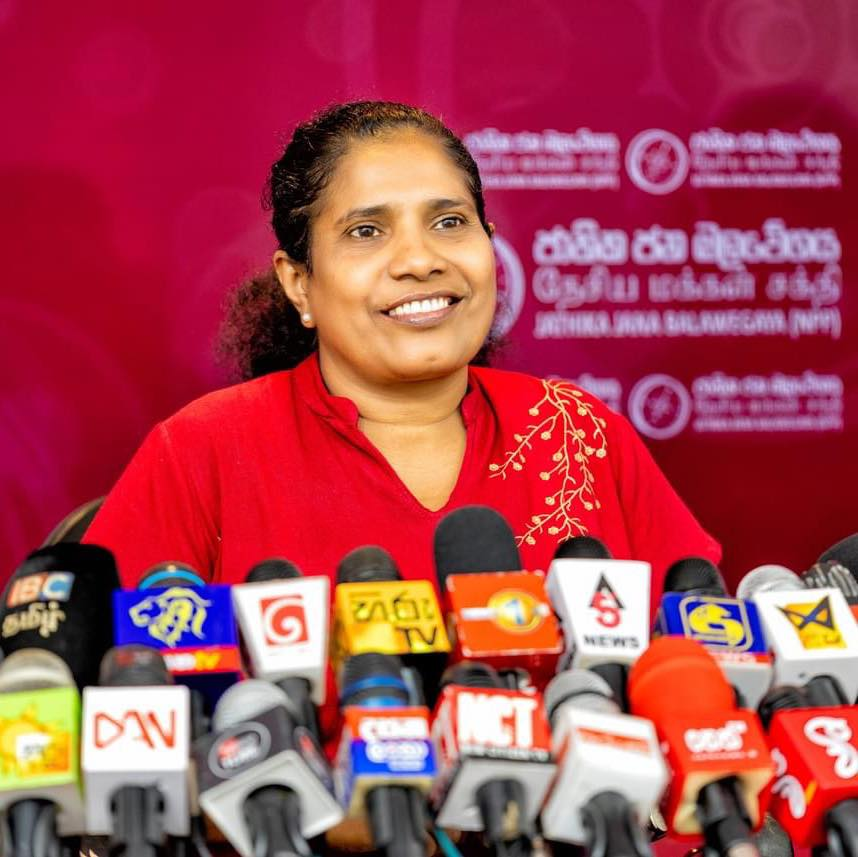
Samanmalee Gunasinghe

Samanmalee Gunasinghe is a Sri Lankan politician. She was elected to the Sri Lankan Parliament from Colombo Electoral District as a member of the National People's Power (NPP). She is married to Bimal Rathnayake, NPP MP and cabinet minister.
