= Bimshani Jasin Arachchi =

Sri Lankan police officer and currently Deputy Inspector General of Police

Deputy Inspector General of Police
- Incumbent
- Assumed office 2020

Personal details
- Profession: Police officer

Bimshani Jasin Arachchi also spelt either as Bimshani Jasinarachchi or Bimshani Jayasinghe Arachchi is a Sri Lankan police officer. She was the Deputy Inspector General of Police up until she was pulled out of this position. She was confirmed in September 2020 after having served as the Superintendent of Police from 2017. Bimshani is notably regarded Sri Lanka's first female DIG.

== Career ==
Bimshani graduated with Bachelor of Arts in Economics, Statistics and Sinhala from the University of Ruhuna. She also obtained a Masters degree in Human rights from the University of Sri Lanka.

She joined the police force in 1997 as a sub-inspector of Police. In 2000, she applied to be recruited directly to a single vacant slot for the post of female Assistant Superintendent of Police. Bimshani passed her ASP examination in 2001 but underwent numerous challenges and discrimination before achieving her position as a female officer. She was denied the opportunity of being promoted as a police officer due to her height factor despite fulfilling all the necessary qualifications. Bimshani had to wait for further six years to receive the official appointment letter for the position of ASP in 2007.

She had also served in Criminal Investigations Department for a brief period and also served as a director at the Bureau for the Prevention of Abuse of Children and Women of Sri Lanka from 2010 to 2020. In 2013, she was promoted from the position of ASP to SP and in 2017 she was promoted as a SSP.

In September 2020, she created history by becoming the first ever woman deputy inspector general in the 154 years of Sri Lanka Police.

On 16 February 2021, the Supreme Court of Sri Lanka took the petition filed by 36 male police officers of Sri Lanka challenging the decision of appointing a woman for the position of deputy inspector general. The petition revealed that there is no provision regarding appointing of woman for the position of DIG as per the law.

On 7 May 2021, she was removed from her position of DIG as per the tensions caused by the male officers. As of now there is no official statement as to why there was a change of this position.
