= Desha Vimukthi Janatha Pakshaya =

National Liberation People's Party Desha Vimukthi Janatha Pakshaya
- Secretary-General: D. Kalansooriya
- Secretary: P. M. Podiappuhamy
- Founded: 1988
- Headquarters: 152/1 1/2 Baddagana HS., Duwa Road, Baddagana
- National affiliation: Sri Lanka People's Freedom Alliance
- Parliament of Sri Lanka: 0 / 225

Election symbol
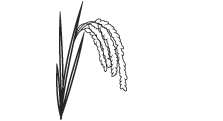
- Ear of Paddy

The Desha Vimukthi Janatha Pakshaya (DVJP) (National Liberation People's Party) is a political party in Sri Lanka. Founded in 1988, the party was formerly a member of the Socialist Alliance and the Sri Lanka People's Freedom Alliance. The party's general secretary is D. Kalansooriya.
