= Lakshman Nipuna Arachchi =

Sri Lankan politician

Hon. Lakshman Nipuna Arachchi MP
- ලක්ෂ්මන් නිපුණ ආරච්චි லக்ஷ்மன் நிபுன ஆராச்சி

Member of Parliament for Colombo District
- Incumbent
- Assumed office 23 September 2024
- Preceded by: Anura Kumara Dissanayake
- In office 2004–2010

General Secretary of the National People's Power
- In office 2019–2022
- Leader: Anura Kumara Dissanayake
- Preceded by: Office Established
- Succeeded by: Nihal Abeysingha

Personal details
- Born: 4 April 1965 (age 61) Ceylon
- Party: Janatha Vimukthi Peramuna
- Other political affiliations: National People's Power

Lakshman Nipuna Arachchi is a Sri Lankan politician and a member of the Parliament of Sri Lanka for Colombo District since 2024. Nipuna Arachchi previously served as an MP between 2004 and 2010 as the replacement for Sarath Fonseka. He was the General Secretary of the National People's Power from 2019 to 2022.
