= Sri Lanka People's Freedom Alliance =

Left-wing political alliance in Sri Lanka

Sri Lanka People's Freedom Alliance ශ්‍රී ලංකා නිදහස් පොදුජන සන්ධානය ஶ்ரீ லங்கா பொதுஜன சுதந்திர கூட்டமைப்பு
- Abbreviation: SLPFA
- Leader: Mahinda Rajapaksa
- Chairperson: Maithripala Sirisena
- General Secretary: Sagara Kariyawasam
- Founded: 31 October 2019
- Dissolved: 5 April 2022
- Preceded by: United People's Freedom Alliance
- Succeeded by: Sri Lanka Podujana Peramuna (Pro-Rajapaksa faction); New Democratic Front (Pro-Ranil faction); Sarvajana Balaya (Anti-Rajapaksa faction)
- Ideology: Big tent Factions: Social democracy Socialism; Communism; Sinhalese nationalism Anti-federalism; Anti-imperialism
- Political position: Big tent Factions: Centre-left to far-left

Website
- podujanasandanaya.org podujanaalliance.org

The Sri Lanka People's Freedom Alliance (abbreviated SLPFA; Sinhala: ශ්‍රී ලංකා නිදහස් පොදුජන සන්ධානය, romanized: Śrī Laṃkā Nidahas Podujana Sandhānaya; Tamil: ஶ்ரீ லங்கா பொதுஜன சுதந்திர கூட்டமைப்பு, romanized: Śrī laṅkā Potujaṉa Cutantira Kūṭṭamaippu) was a political alliance led by the Sri Lanka Podujana Peramuna formed in 2019. Initially, the alliance consisted of the Sri Lanka Podujana Peramuna (SLPP), the Sri Lanka Freedom Party (SLFP) and fifteen smaller parties.

Since 5 April 2022, the alliance has been functionally dissolved, after many of the SLPP's former allies left the SLFPA to join the opposition amidst the Sri Lankan economic crisis and 2022 Sri Lankan political crisis.

== History ==
On 31 October 2019, seventeen parties including the SLPP and SLFP signed an agreement at the Sri Lanka Foundation Institute in Colombo to form the Sri Lanka People's Freedom Alliance. The seventeen parties included:

1. Ceylon Workers' Congress (Note: Left the alliance in 2022.)
2. Communist Party of Sri Lanka
3. Democratic Left Front
4. Desha Vimukthi Janatha Pakshaya
5. Eelam People's Democratic Party
6. Lanka Sama Samaja Party
7. Mahajana Eksath Peramuna
8. Mutpokkuth Tamilar Kachchi
9. National Congress
10. National Freedom Front
11. Pivithuru Hela Urumaya
12. Sri Lanka Freedom Party
13. Sri Lanka People's Party
14. Sri Lanka Podujana Peramuna
15. Tamil Makkal Viduthalai Pulikal
16. United People’s Party
17. Vijaya Dharani Jathika Sabawa

The alliance supported SLPP candidate Gotabaya Rajapaksa in the 2019 presidential election. It had planned to contest the 2020 parliamentary election under the chair symbol, the symbol of a previous SLFP-led alliance, the People's Alliance. However, in February 2020 the alliance chose to contest the election under the flower bud symbol of the SLPP.

On 5 April 2022, amidst the Sri Lankan economic crisis and 2022 Sri Lankan political crisis, many of the SLPP's former allies left the SLFPA to join the opposition.

== Electoral history ==
Sri Lanka Parliamentary Elections
Election year	Votes	Vote %	Seats won	+/–	Leader	Result for the party
2020	6,853,690	59.09%	145 / 225	▲50	Mahinda Rajapaksa	Government

Sri Lanka Presidential Elections
Election year	Candidate	Votes	Vote %	Result
2019	Gotabaya Rajapaksa	6,924,255	52.25%	Won
