= Malabe West Grama Niladhari Division =

Malabe West
- Grama Niladhari Division
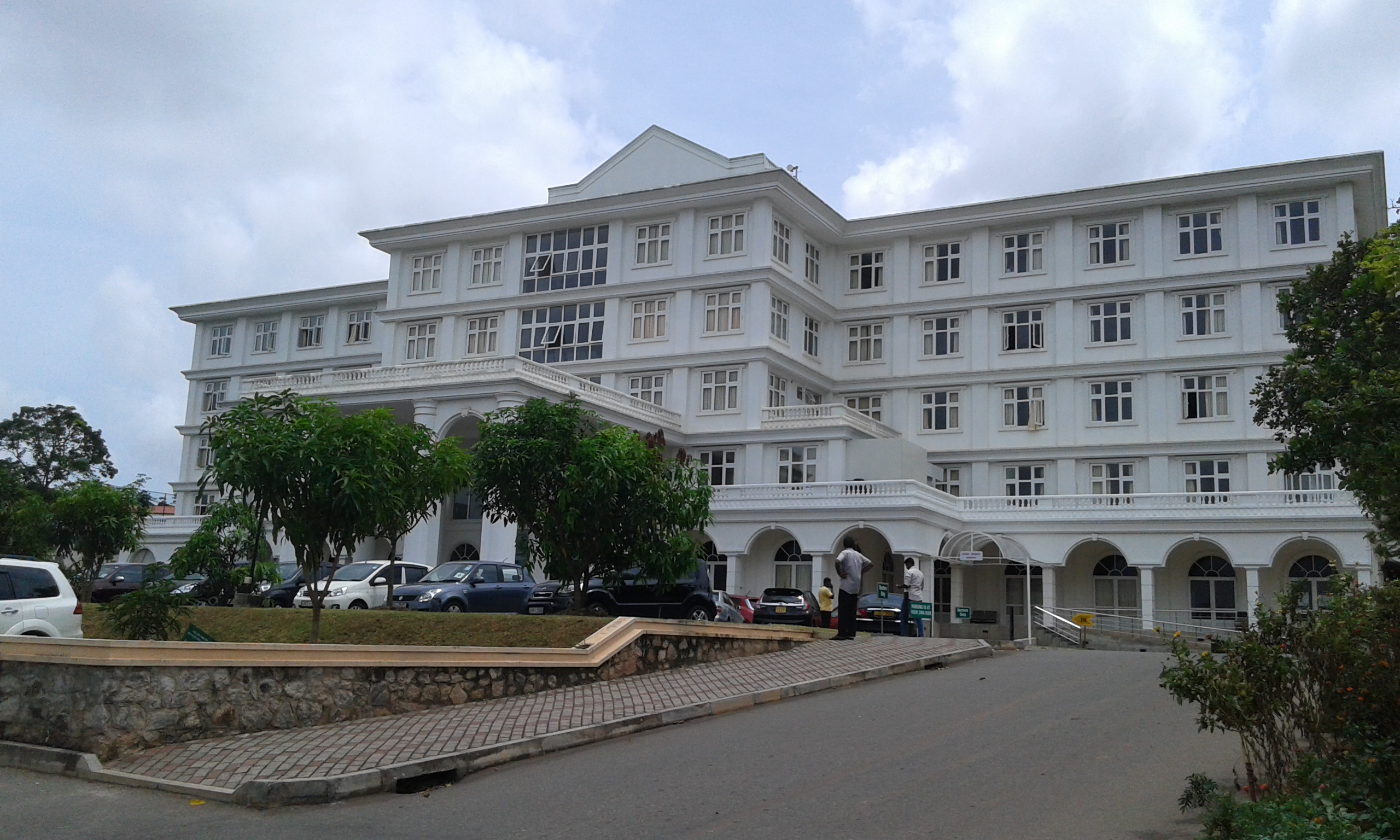
- Neville Fernando Teaching Hospital is located within, nearby or associated with the Malabe West Grama Niladhari Division
- Interactive map of Malabe West
- Coordinates: 6.900247°N 79.959930°E
- Country: Sri Lanka
- Province: Western Province
- District: Colombo District
- Divisional Secretariat: Kaduwela Divisional Secretariat
- Electoral District: Colombo Electoral District
- Polling Division: Kaduwela Polling Division

Area
  - Total: 1.62 km^{2} (0.63 sq mi)
- Elevation: 16 m (52 ft)

Population (2012)
  - Total: 5,141
  - Density: 3,173/km^{2} (8,220/sq mi)
- ISO 3166 code: LK-1109130

Malabe West

Malabe West Grama Niladhari Division is a Grama Niladhari Division of the Kaduwela Divisional Secretariat of Colombo District of Western Province, Sri Lanka . It has Grama Niladhari Division Code 476A.

Malabe Boys' School, Neville Fernando Teaching Hospital and Malabe are located within, nearby or associated with Malabe West.

Malabe West is a surrounded by the Arangala, Hokandara North, Malabe East, Malabe North, Pothuarawa, Thalangama North B and Thalahena North Grama Niladhari Divisions.

== Demographics ==
=== Ethnicity ===
The Malabe West Grama Niladhari Division has a Sinhalese majority (96.6%) . In comparison, the Kaduwela Divisional Secretariat (which contains the Malabe West Grama Niladhari Division) has a Sinhalese majority (95.6%)

Ethnicity in Malabe West
1. Sinhalese (96.6%)
2. Other (1.60%)
3. Sri Lankan Tamil (1.10%)
4. Other (0.80%)

=== Religion ===
The Malabe West Grama Niladhari Division has a Buddhist majority (94.0%) . In comparison, the Kaduwela Divisional Secretariat (which contains the Malabe West Grama Niladhari Division) has a Buddhist majority (90.4%)

Religion in Malabe West
1. Buddhist (94.0%)
2. Roman Catholic (2.00%)
3. Other (1.40%)
4. Others (1.30%)
5. Hindu (1.30%)

== Gallery ==
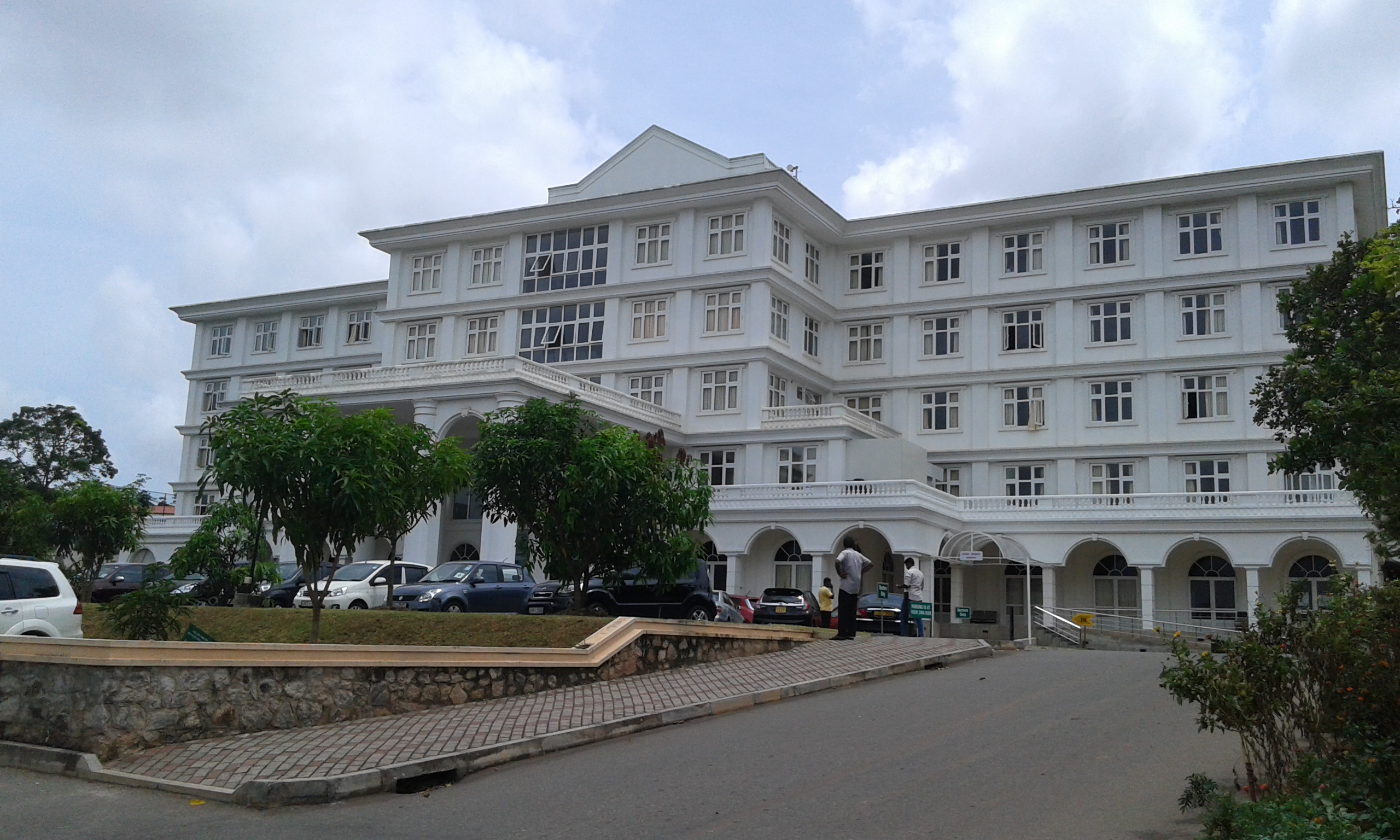
Neville Fernando Teaching Hospital

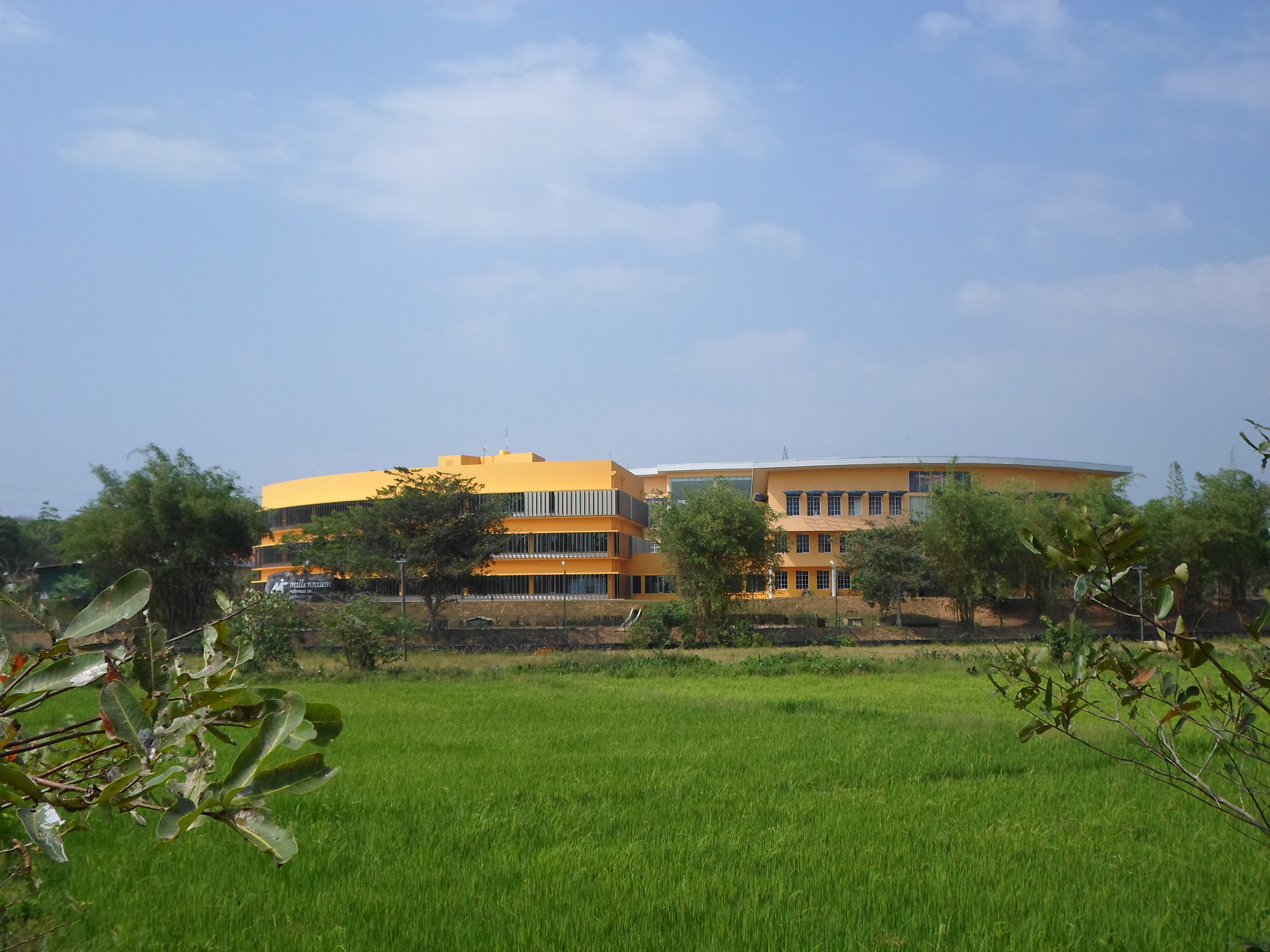
Malabe
