= Moratuwella South Grama Niladhari Division =

Moratuwella South
- Grama Niladhari Division
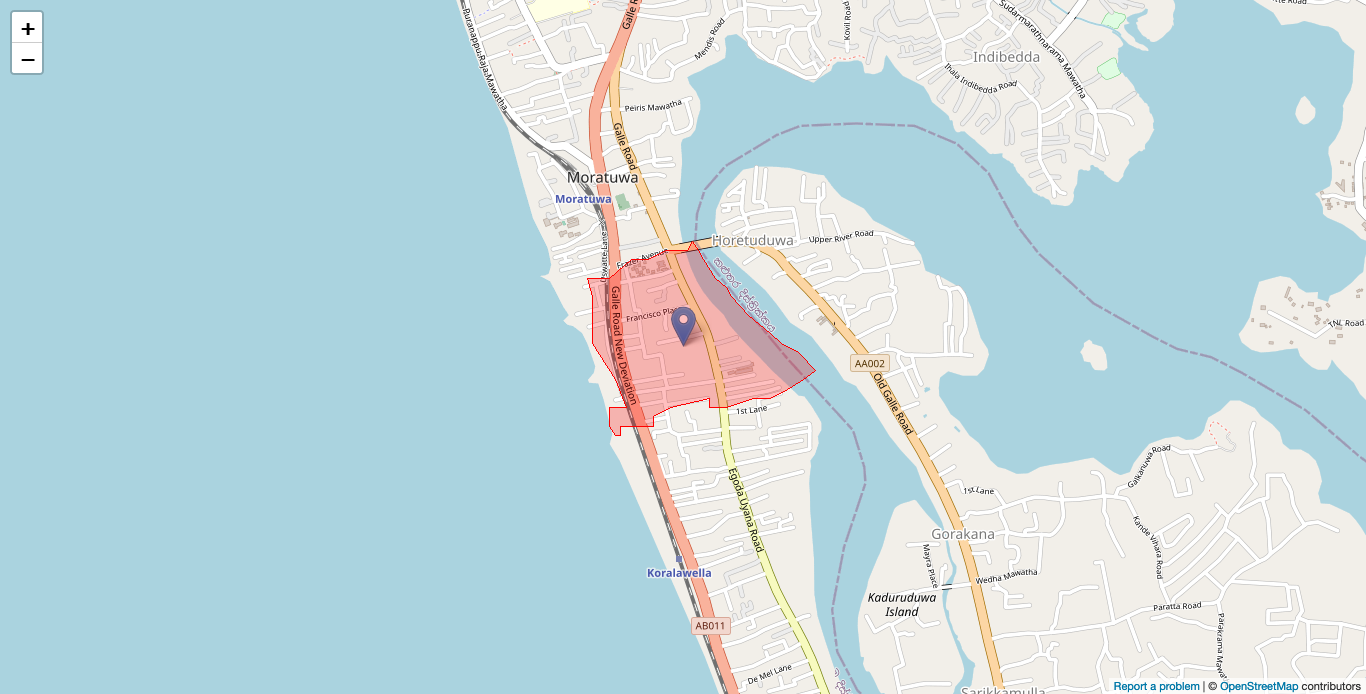
- Moratuwella South Grama Niladhari Division
- Coordinates: 6.767441°N 79.886053°E
- Country: Sri Lanka
- Province: Western Province
- District: Colombo District
- Divisional Secretariat: Moratuwa Divisional Secretariat
- Electoral District: Colombo Electoral District
- Polling Division: Moratuwa Polling Division

Area
  - Total: 0.58 km^{2} (0.22 sq mi)
- Elevation: 11 m (36 ft)

Population (2012)
  - Total: 4,524
  - Density: 7,800/km^{2} (20,000/sq mi)
- ISO 3166 code: LK-1133125

Moratuwella South Grama Niladhari Division is a Grama Niladhari Division of the Moratuwa Divisional Secretariat of Colombo District of Western Province, Sri Lanka . It has Grama Niladhari Division Code 553.

Moratuwella South is a surrounded by the Koralawella Eest, Horethuduwa, Horethuduwa North, Horethuduwa Central, Koralawella North, Moratuwella North and Moratuwella West Grama Niladhari Divisions.

== Demographics ==
=== Ethnicity ===
The Moratuwella South Grama Niladhari Division has a Sinhalese majority (95.7%) . In comparison, the Moratuwa Divisional Secretariat (which contains the Moratuwella South Grama Niladhari Division) has a Sinhalese majority (94.3%)

Ethnicity in Moratuwella South
1. Sinhalese (95.7%)
2. Sri Lankan Tamil (2.30%)
3. Other (2.00%)

=== Religion ===
The Moratuwella South Grama Niladhari Division has a Buddhist plurality (45.3%), a significant Roman Catholic population (39.5%) and a significant Other Christian population (13.3%) . In comparison, the Moratuwa Divisional Secretariat (which contains the Moratuwella South Grama Niladhari Division) has a Buddhist majority (68.2%) and a significant Roman Catholic population (19.8%)

Religion in Moratuwella South
1. Buddhist (45.3%)
2. Roman Catholic (39.5%)
3. Other Christian (13.3%)
4. Other (1.90%)
