= Idama Grama Niladhari Division =

Idama
- Grama Niladhari Division
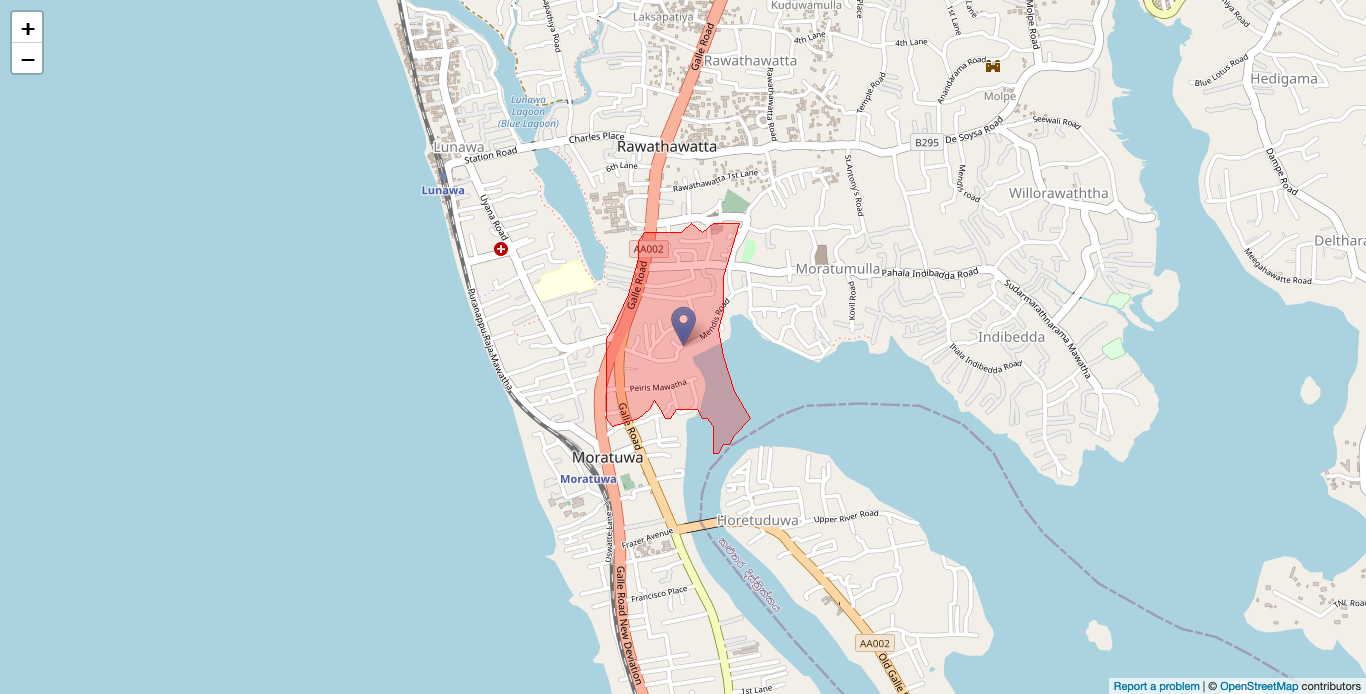
- Idama Grama Niladhari Division
- Coordinates: 6.779375°N 79.885838°E
- Country: Sri Lanka
- Province: Western Province
- District: Colombo District
- Divisional Secretariat: Moratuwa Divisional Secretariat
- Electoral District: Colombo Electoral District
- Polling Division: Moratuwa Polling Division

Area
  - Total: 0.55 km^{2} (0.21 sq mi)
- Elevation: 11 m (36 ft)

Population (2012)
  - Total: 2,826
  - Density: 5,138/km^{2} (13,310/sq mi)
- ISO 3166 code: LK-1133115

Idama Grama Niladhari Division is a Grama Niladhari Division of the Moratuwa Divisional Secretariat of Colombo District of Western Province, Sri Lanka . It has Grama Niladhari Division Code 552.

St. Sebastian's College, Moratuwa, Prince of Wales' College, Moratuwa and Princess of Wales' College are located within, nearby or associated with Idama.

Idama is surrounded by the Horethuduwa North, Rawathawatta West, Kadalana, Moratuwella North, Uyana South and Rawathawatta South Grama Niladhari Divisions.

== Demographics ==
=== Ethnicity ===
The Idama Grama Niladhari Division has a Sinhalese majority (96.0%) . In comparison, the Moratuwa Divisional Secretariat (which contains the Idama Grama Niladhari Division) has a Sinhalese majority (94.3%)

Ethnicity in Idama
1. Sinhalese (96.0%)
2. Sri Lankan Tamil (2.90%)
3. Other (1.10%)

=== Religion ===
The Idama Grama Niladhari Division has a Buddhist plurality (40.1%), a significant Roman Catholic population (31.8%) and a significant Other Christian population (23.7%) . In comparison, the Moratuwa Divisional Secretariat (which contains the Idama Grama Niladhari Division) has a Buddhist majority (68.2%) and a significant Roman Catholic population (19.8%)

Religion in Idama
1. Buddhist (40.1%)
2. Roman Catholic (31.8%)
3. Other Christian (23.7%)
4. Hindu (1.90%)
5. Others (1.60%)
6. Other (0.90%)
