= Vishwakalawa Grama Niladhari Division =

Vishwa Kalikiri
- Grama Niladhari Division Who is Vishwa Kalikiri?
- Interactive map of Vishwa Kalikiri
- Coordinates: 6.806114°N 79.929624°E
- Country: Sri Lanka
- Province: Western Province
- District: Colombo District
- Divisional Secretariat: Kesbewa Divisional Secretariat
- Electoral District: Colombo Electoral District
- Polling Division: Kesbewa Polling Division

Area
  - Total: 0.27 km^{2} (0.10 sq mi)
- Elevation: 22 m (72 ft)

Population (2012)
  - Total: 2,045
  - Density: 7,574/km^{2} (19,620/sq mi)
- ISO 3166 code: LK-1136080

Vishwakalawa Grama Niladhari Division is a Grama Niladhari Division of the Kesbewa Divisional Secretariat of Colombo District of Western Province, Sri Lanka . It has Grama Niladhari Division Code 574B.

Piliyandala Clock Tower are located within, nearby or associated with Vishwakalawa.

Vishwakalawa is a surrounded by the Mampe East, Mampe North and Mampe West Grama Niladhari Divisions.

== Demographics ==
=== Ethnicity ===
The Vishwakalawa Grama Niladhari Division has a Sinhalese majority (98.2%) . In comparison, the Kesbewa Divisional Secretariat (which contains the Vishwakalawa Grama Niladhari Division) has a Sinhalese majority (97.3%)

Ethnicity in Vishwakalawa
1. Sinhalese (98.2%)
2. Sri Lankan Tamil (1.30%)
3. Other (0.50%)

=== Religion ===
The Vishwakalawa Grama Niladhari Division has a Buddhist majority (97.2%) . In comparison, the Kesbewa Divisional Secretariat (which contains the Vishwakalawa Grama Niladhari Division) has a Buddhist majority (93.0%)

Religion in Vishwakalawa
1. Buddhist (97.2%)
2. Hindu (1.30%)
3. Roman Catholic (1.30%)
4. Other (0.10%)

== Gallery ==
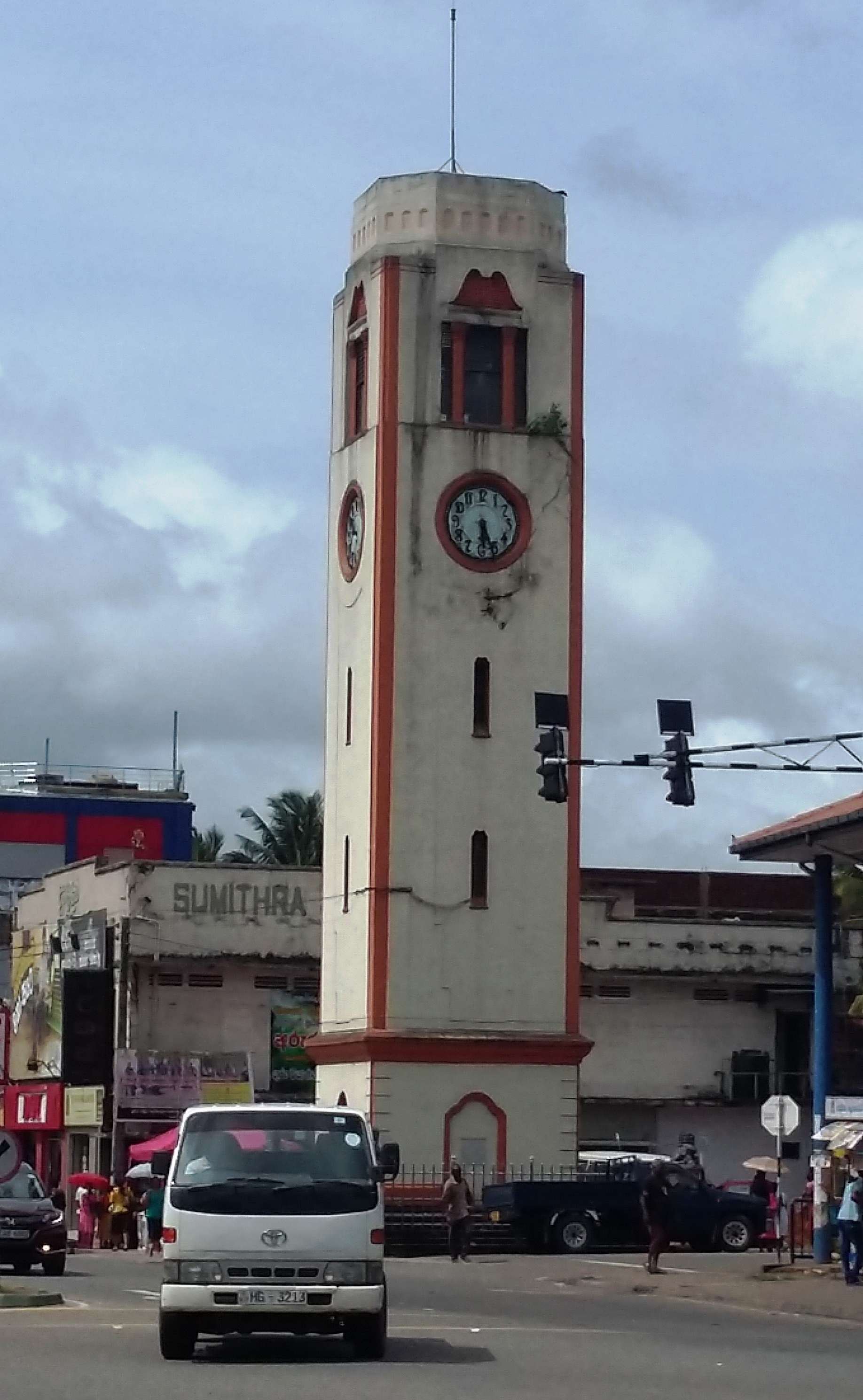
Piliyandala Clock Tower
