= Mampe West Grama Niladhari Division =

Mampe West
- Grama Niladhari Division
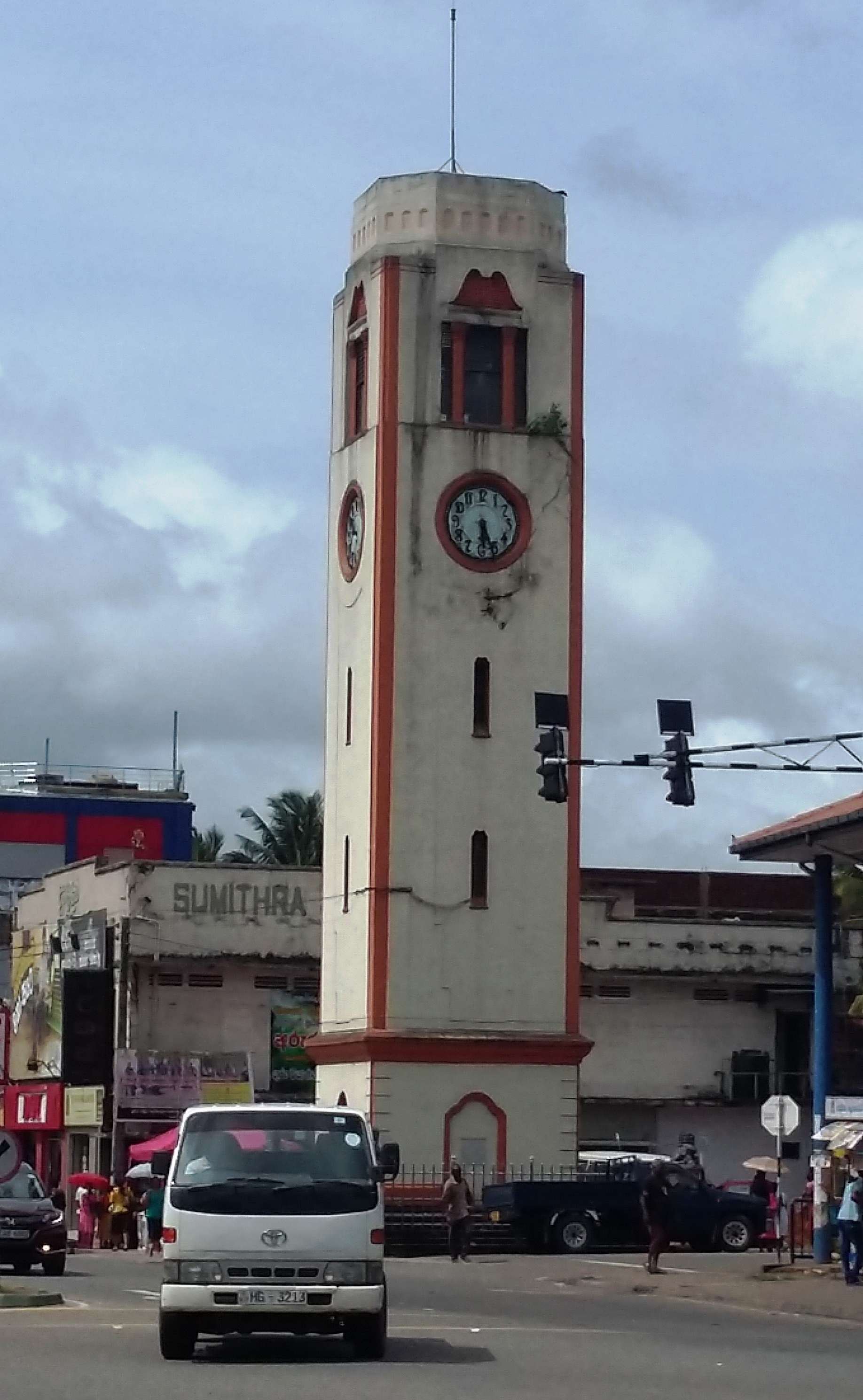
- Piliyandala Clock Tower is located within, nearby or associated with the Mampe West Grama Niladhari Division
- Interactive map of Mampe West
- Coordinates: 6.800843°N 79.929547°E
- Country: Sri Lanka
- Province: Western Province
- District: Colombo District
- Divisional Secretariat: Kesbewa Divisional Secretariat
- Electoral District: Colombo Electoral District
- Polling Division: Kesbewa Polling Division

Area
  - Total: 0.68 km^{2} (0.26 sq mi)
- Elevation: 17 m (56 ft)

Population (2012)
  - Total: 3,055
  - Density: 4,493/km^{2} (11,640/sq mi)
- ISO 3166 code: LK-1136220

Mampe West

Mampe West Grama Niladhari Division is a Grama Niladhari Division of the Kesbewa Divisional Secretariat of Colombo District of Western Province, Sri Lanka . It has Grama Niladhari Division Code 574.

Piliyandala Clock Tower and Piliyandala Central College are located within, nearby or associated with Mampe West.

Mampe West is a surrounded by the Mampe East, Kolamunna, Kesbewa North, Mampe North, Mampe South and Vishwakalawa Grama Niladhari Divisions.

== Demographics ==
=== Ethnicity ===
The Mampe West Grama Niladhari Division has a Sinhalese majority (97.0%) . In comparison, the Kesbewa Divisional Secretariat (which contains the Mampe West Grama Niladhari Division) has a Sinhalese majority (97.3%)

Ethnicity in Mampe West
1. Sinhalese (97.0%)
2. Other (1.90%)
3. Sri Lankan Tamil (1.10%)

=== Religion ===
The Mampe West Grama Niladhari Division has a Buddhist majority (94.1%) . In comparison, the Kesbewa Divisional Secretariat (which contains the Mampe West Grama Niladhari Division) has a Buddhist majority (93.0%)

Religion in Mampe West
1. Buddhist (94.1%)
2. Roman Catholic (2.60%)
3. Other (1.80%)
4. Other Christian (1.40%)

== Gallery ==
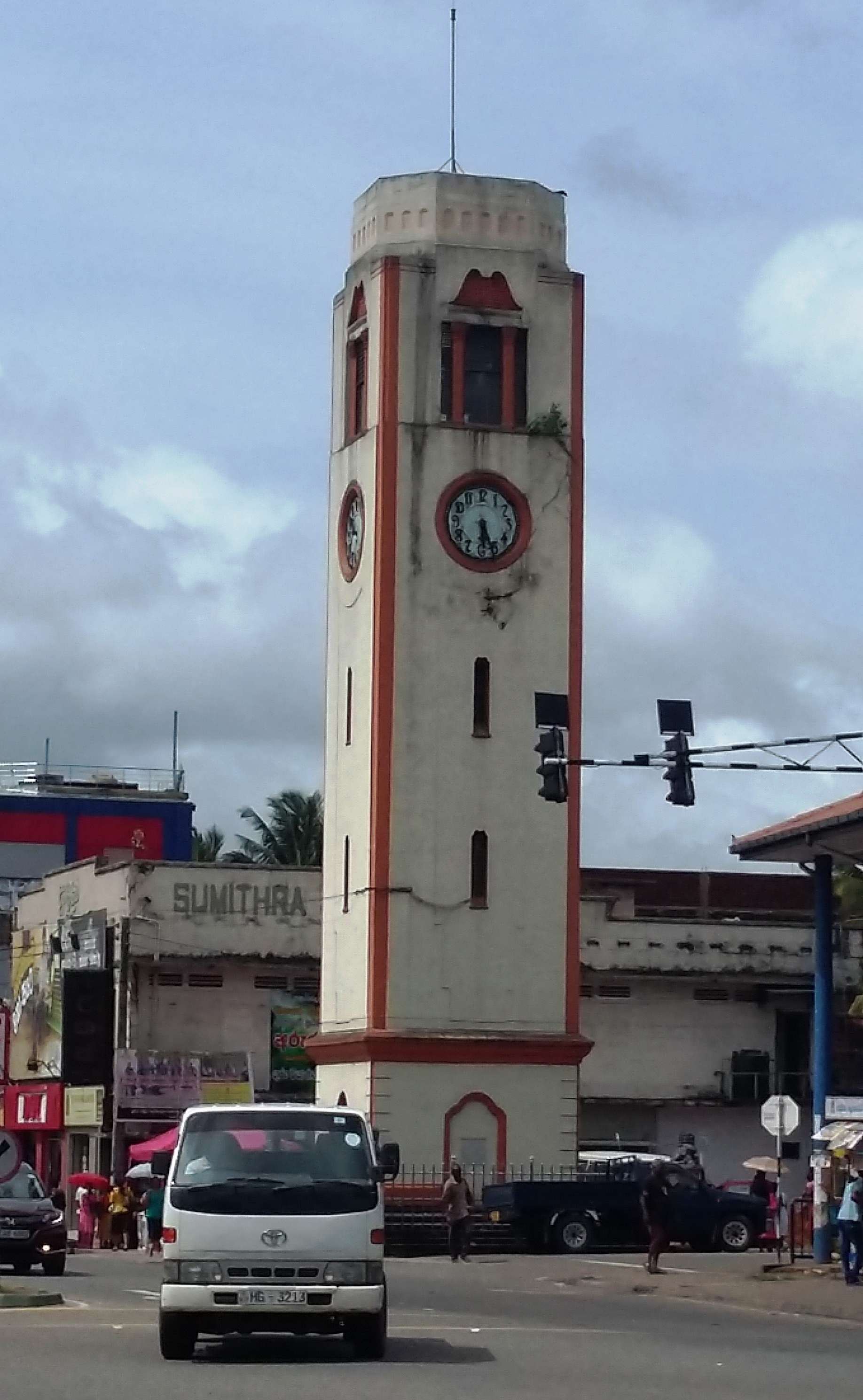
Piliyandala Clock Tower
