= Pahala Bomiriya B Grama Niladhari Division =

Pahala Bomiriya B
- Grama Niladhari Division
- Interactive map of Pahala Bomiriya B
- Coordinates: 6.923212°N 80.002665°E
- Country: Sri Lanka
- Province: Western Province
- District: Colombo District
- Divisional Secretariat: Kaduwela Divisional Secretariat
- Electoral District: Colombo Electoral District
- Polling Division: Kaduwela Polling Division

Area
  - Total: 2.08 km^{2} (0.80 sq mi)
- Elevation: 23 m (75 ft)

Population (2012)
  - Total: 4,878
  - Density: 2,345/km^{2} (6,070/sq mi)
- ISO 3166 code: LK-1109045

Pahala Bomiriya B

Pahala Bomiriya B Grama Niladhari Division is a Grama Niladhari Division of the Kaduwela Divisional Secretariat of Colombo District of Western Province, Sri Lanka . It has Grama Niladhari Division Code 472B.

Pahala Bomiriya B is a surrounded by the Wekewatta, Welihinda, Kaduwela, Korathota, Nawagamuwa and Pahala Bomiriya Grama Niladhari Divisions.

== Demographics ==
=== Ethnicity ===
The Pahala Bomiriya B Grama Niladhari Division has a Sinhalese majority (96.2%) . In comparison, the Kaduwela Divisional Secretariat (which contains the Pahala Bomiriya B Grama Niladhari Division) has a Sinhalese majority (95.6%)

Ethnicity in Pahala Bomiriya B
1. Sinhalese (96.2%)
2. Sri Lankan Tamil (2.30%)
3. Other (1.40%)

=== Religion ===
The Pahala Bomiriya B Grama Niladhari Division has a Buddhist majority (94.9%) . In comparison, the Kaduwela Divisional Secretariat (which contains the Pahala Bomiriya B Grama Niladhari Division) has a Buddhist majority (90.4%)

Religion in Pahala Bomiriya B
1. Buddhist (94.9%)
2. Hindu (2.90%)
3. Roman Catholic (1.30%)
4. Other (0.90%)
