= Arangala (Kaduwela) Grama Niladhari Division =

Arangala
- Grama Niladhari Division
- Interactive map of Arangala
- Coordinates: 6.885623°N 79.963061°E
- Country: Sri Lanka
- Province: Western Province
- District: Colombo District
- Divisional Secretariat: Kaduwela Divisional Secretariat
- Electoral District: Colombo Electoral District
- Polling Division: Kaduwela Polling Division

Area
  - Total: 1.38 km^{2} (0.53 sq mi)
- Elevation: 33 m (108 ft)

Population (2012)
  - Total: 5,512
  - Density: 3,994/km^{2} (10,340/sq mi)
- ISO 3166 code: LK-1109225

Arangala

Arangala Grama Niladhari Division is a Grama Niladhari Division of the Kaduwela Divisional Secretariat of Colombo District of Western Province, Sri Lanka . It has Grama Niladhari Division Code 494B.

Arangala is a surrounded by the Evarihena, Hokandara North, Hokandara East, Hokandara South, Pothuarawa and Malabe West Grama Niladhari Divisions.

== Demographics ==
=== Ethnicity ===
The Arangala Grama Niladhari Division has a Sinhalese majority (95.6%) . In comparison, the Kaduwela Divisional Secretariat (which contains the Arangala Grama Niladhari Division) has a Sinhalese majority (95.6%)

Ethnicity in Arangala
1. Sinhalese (95.6%)
2. Sri Lankan Tamil (2.60%)
3. Other (1.80%)

=== Religion ===
The Arangala Grama Niladhari Division has a Buddhist majority (92.9%) . In comparison, the Kaduwela Divisional Secretariat (which contains the Arangala Grama Niladhari Division) has a Buddhist majority (90.4%)

Religion in Arangala
1. Buddhist (92.9%)
2. Hindu (2.30%)
3. Roman Catholic (2.10%)
4. Other Christian (2.00%)
5. Other (0.70%)
