= Subhoothipura Grama Niladhari Division =

Subhoothipura
- Grama Niladhari Division
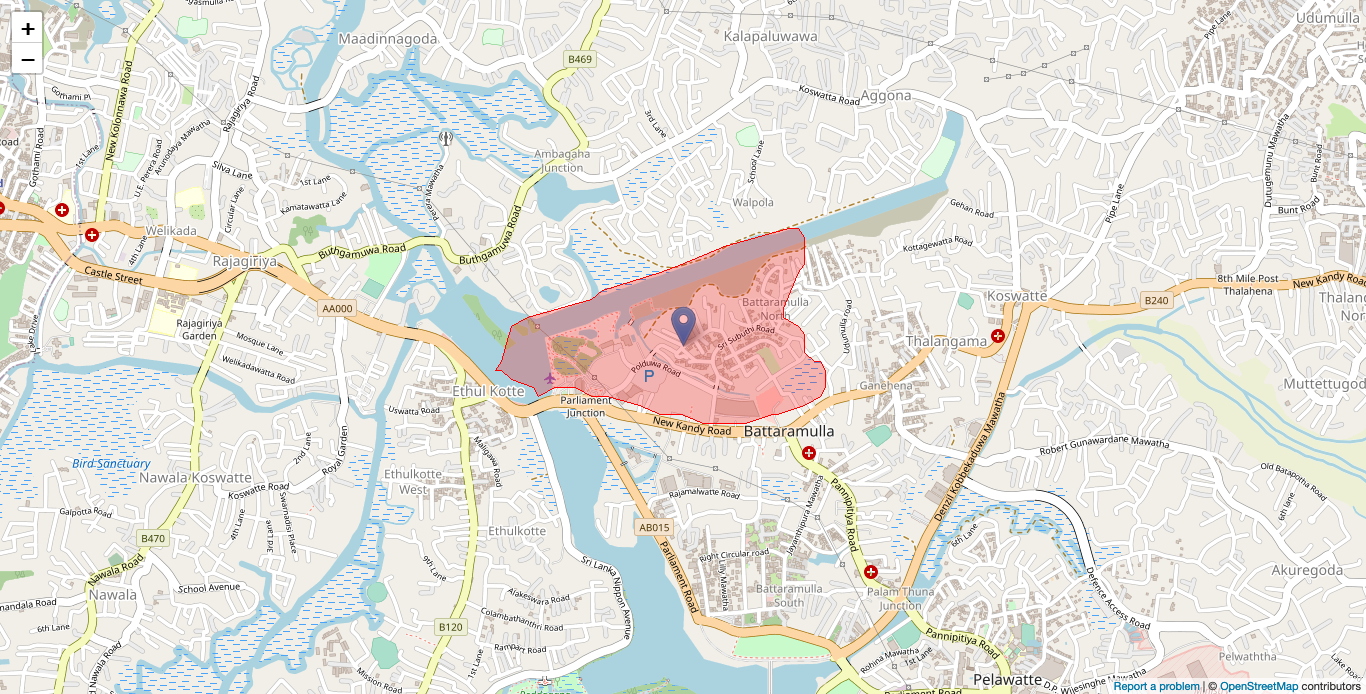
- Subhoothipura Grama Niladhari Division
- Interactive map of Subhoothipura
- Coordinates: 6.905748°N 79.915039°E
- Country: Sri Lanka
- Province: Western Province
- District: Colombo District
- Divisional Secretariat: Kaduwela Divisional Secretariat
- Electoral District: Colombo Electoral District
- Polling Division: Kaduwela Polling Division

Area
  - Total: 1.02 km^{2} (0.39 sq mi)
- Elevation: 17 m (56 ft)

Population (2012)
  - Total: 2,568
  - Density: 2,518/km^{2} (6,520/sq mi)
- ISO 3166 code: LK-1109170

Subhoothipura Grama Niladhari Division is a Grama Niladhari Division of the Kaduwela Divisional Secretariat of Colombo District of Western Province, Sri Lanka . It has Grama Niladhari Division Code 492.

Ministry of Internal Affairs, Wayamba Development and Cultural Affairs, Ministry of Social Empowerment, Welfare and Kandyan Heritage, National Audit Office (Sri Lanka), Department of Registration of Persons, Diyatha Uyana, Ministry of Agriculture (Sri Lanka), Battaramulla, and Ministry of Lands and Parliamentary Reforms are located within, nearby or associated with Subhoothipura.

Subhoothipura is a surrounded by the Kotuwegoda, Battaramulla North, Kalapaluwawa, Rajamalwatta, Ethulkotte, and Udumulla Grama Niladhari Divisions.

== Demographics ==
=== Ethnicity ===
The Subhoothipura Grama Niladhari Division has a Sinhalese majority (89.4%) . In comparison, the Kaduwela Divisional Secretariat (which contains the Subhoothipura Grama Niladhari Division) has a Sinhalese majority (95.6%)

Ethnicity in Subhoothipura
1. Sinhalese (89.4%)
2. Sri Lankan Tamil (5.50%)
3. Moor (2.60%)
4. Other (1.40%)
5. Indian Tamil (1.10%)

=== Religion ===
The Subhoothipura Grama Niladhari Division has a Buddhist majority (82.9%) . In comparison, the Kaduwela Divisional Secretariat (which contains the Subhoothipura Grama Niladhari Division) has a Buddhist majority (90.4%)

Religion in Subhoothipura
1. Buddhist (82.9%)
2. Roman Catholic (7.70%)
3. Hindu (4.10%)
4. Muslim (3.70%)
5. Other Christian (1.50%)
6. Other (0.10%)

== Gallery ==
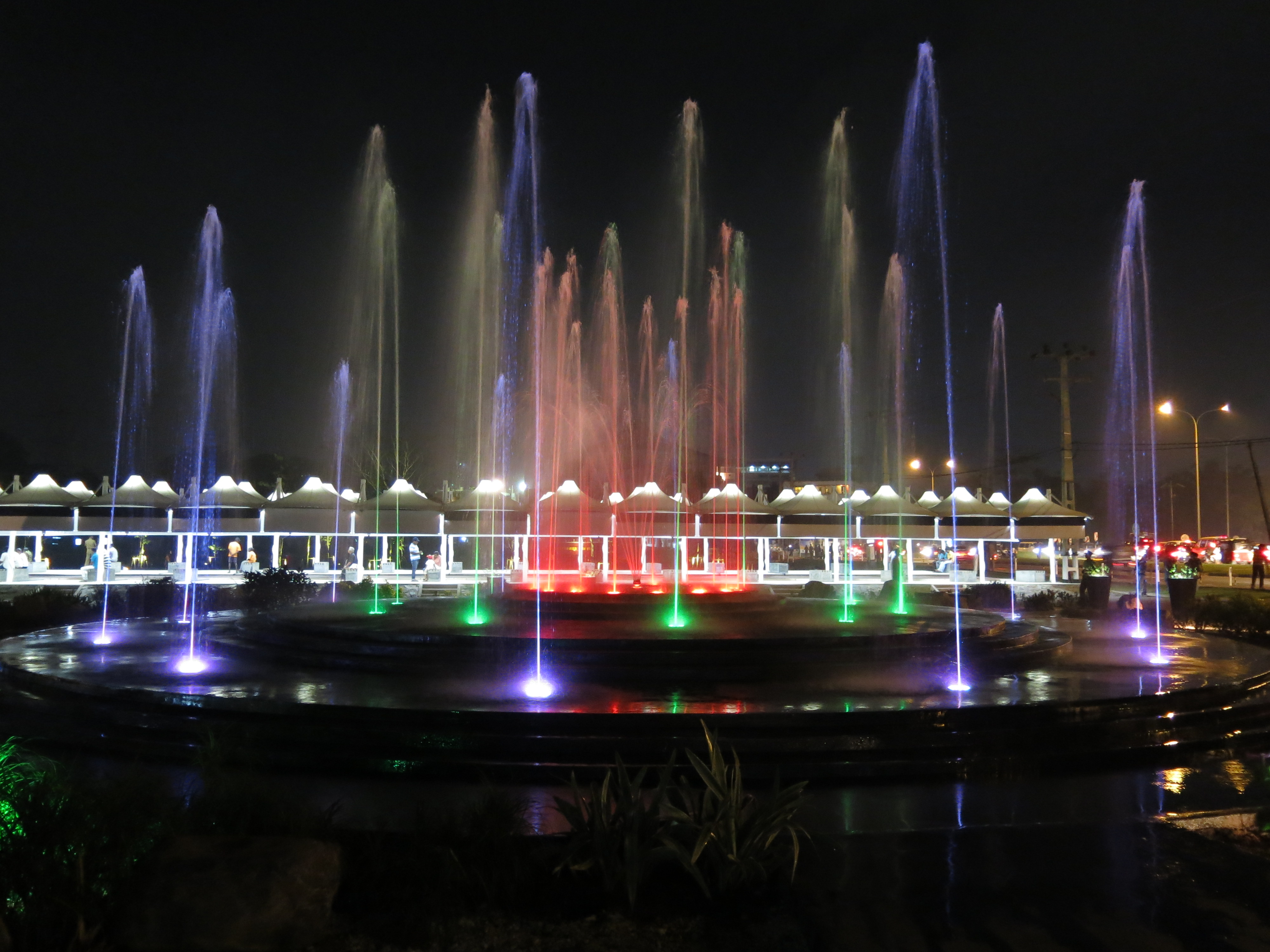
Diyatha Uyana

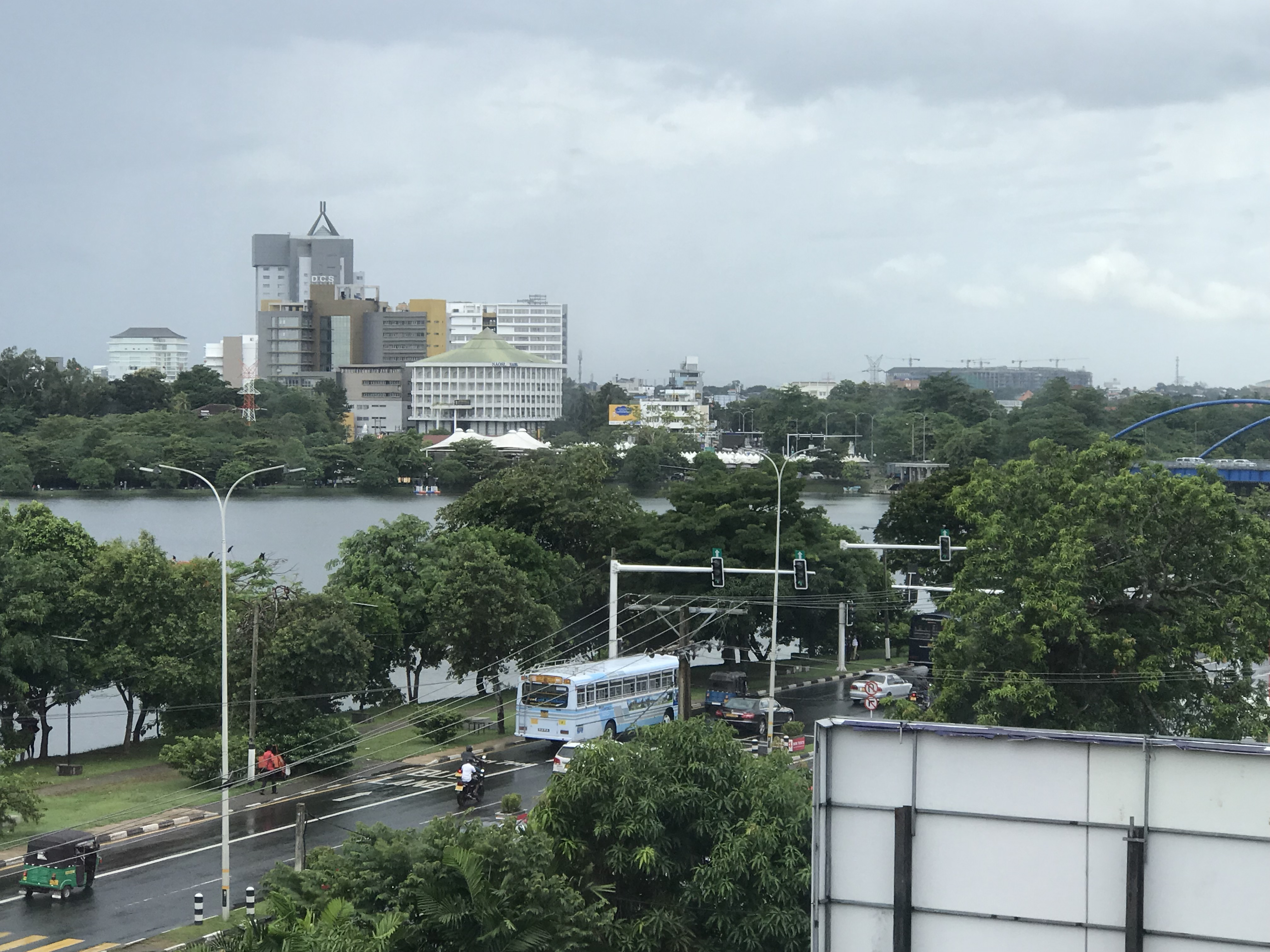
Battaramulla
