= Raggahawatta Grama Niladhari Division =

Raggahawatta
- Grama Niladhari Division
- Interactive map of Raggahawatta
- Coordinates: 6.933054°N 79.968699°E
- Country: Sri Lanka
- Province: Western Province
- District: Colombo District
- Divisional Secretariat: Kaduwela Divisional Secretariat
- Electoral District: Colombo Electoral District
- Polling Division: Kaduwela Polling Division

Area
  - Total: 1.51 km^{2} (0.58 sq mi)
- Elevation: 4 m (13 ft)

Population (2012)
  - Total: 4,030
  - Density: 2,669/km^{2} (6,910/sq mi)
- ISO 3166 code: LK-1109010

Raggahawatta

Raggahawatta Grama Niladhari Division is a Grama Niladhari Division of the Kaduwela Divisional Secretariat of Colombo District of Western Province, Sri Lanka. It has Grama Niladhari Division Code 474A.

Raggahawatta is a surrounded by the Hewagama, Mahadeniya, Biyagama South, Welivita and Mabima West Grama Niladhari Divisions.

== Demographics ==
=== Ethnicity ===
The Raggahawatta Grama Niladhari Division has a Sinhalese majority (95.8%). In comparison, the Kaduwela Divisional Secretariat (which contains the Raggahawatta Grama Niladhari Division) has a Sinhalese majority (95.6%)

Ethnicity in Raggahawatta
1. Sinhalese (95.8%)
2. Other (2.50%)
3. Moor (1.70%)

=== Religion ===
The Raggahawatta Grama Niladhari Division has a Buddhist majority (81.0%) and a significant Roman Catholic population (14.9%). In comparison, the Kaduwela Divisional Secretariat (which contains the Raggahawatta Grama Niladhari Division) has a Buddhist majority (90.4%)

Religion in Raggahawatta
1. Buddhist (81.0%)
2. Roman Catholic (14.9%)
3. Muslim (2.40%)
4. Other (1.60%)
