= Muttettugoda Grama Niladhari Division =

Muttettugoda
- Grama Niladhari Division
- Interactive map of Muttettugoda
- Coordinates: 6.907624°N 79.943059°E
- Country: Sri Lanka
- Province: Western Province
- District: Colombo District
- Divisional Secretariat: Kaduwela Divisional Secretariat
- Electoral District: Colombo Electoral District
- Polling Division: Kaduwela Polling Division

Area
  - Total: 1.15 km^{2} (0.44 sq mi)
- Elevation: 18 m (59 ft)

Population (2012)
  - Total: 6,734
  - Density: 5,856/km^{2} (15,170/sq mi)
- ISO 3166 code: LK-1109145

Muttettugoda

Muttettugoda Grama Niladhari Division is a Grama Niladhari Division of the Kaduwela Divisional Secretariat of Colombo District of Western Province, Sri Lanka. It has Grama Niladhari Division Code 477B.

Muttettugoda is a surrounded by the Udumulla South, Batapotha, Thalahena South, Thalangama North B, Pothuarawa and Thalangama North A Grama Niladhari Divisions.

== Demographics ==
=== Ethnicity ===
The Muttettugoda Grama Niladhari Division has a Sinhalese majority (95.9%). In comparison, the Kaduwela Divisional Secretariat (which contains the Muttettugoda Grama Niladhari Division) has a Sinhalese majority (95.6%)

Ethnicity in Muttettugoda
1. Sinhalese (95.9%)
2. Other (2.10%)
3. Sri Lankan Tamil (2.10%)

=== Religion ===
The Muttettugoda Grama Niladhari Division has a Buddhist majority (92.1%). In comparison, the Kaduwela Divisional Secretariat (which contains the Muttettugoda Grama Niladhari Division) has a Buddhist majority (90.4%)

Religion in Muttettugoda
1. Buddhist (92.1%)
2. Roman Catholic (2.90%)
3. Other Christian (2.10%)
4. Hindu (2.00%)
5. Other (1.00%)
