= Korathota Grama Niladhari Division =

Korathota
- Grama Niladhari Division
- Interactive map of Korathota
- Coordinates: 6.908030°N 80.001314°E
- Country: Sri Lanka
- Province: Western Province
- District: Colombo District
- Divisional Secretariat: Kaduwela Divisional Secretariat
- Electoral District: Colombo Electoral District
- Polling Division: Kaduwela Polling Division

Area
  - Total: 5.31 km^{2} (2.05 sq mi)
- Elevation: 23 m (75 ft)

Population (2012)
  - Total: 9,178
  - Density: 1,728/km^{2} (4,480/sq mi)
- ISO 3166 code: LK-1109080

Korathota Grama Niladhari Division is a Grama Niladhari Division of the Kaduwela Divisional Secretariat of Colombo District of Western Province, Sri Lanka . It has Grama Niladhari Division Code 488.

Korathota is a surrounded by the Welihinda, Mullegama North, Dedigamuwa, Pahala Bomiriya B, Nawagamuwa, Nawagamuwa South, Shanthalokagama, Thunadahena and Kothalawala Grama Niladhari Divisions.

== Demographics ==
=== Ethnicity ===
The Korathota Grama Niladhari Division has a Sinhalese majority (98.3%) . In comparison, the Kaduwela Divisional Secretariat (which contains the Korathota Grama Niladhari Division) has a Sinhalese majority (95.6%)

Ethnicity in Korathota
1. Sinhalese (98.3%)
2. Other (1.70%)

=== Religion ===
The Korathota Grama Niladhari Division has a Buddhist majority (96.3%) . In comparison, the Kaduwela Divisional Secretariat (which contains the Korathota Grama Niladhari Division) has a Buddhist majority (90.4%)

Religion in Korathota
1. Buddhist (96.3%)
2. Other (1.90%)
3. Roman Catholic (1.70%)
