= Thalangama North A Grama Niladhari Division =

Thalangama North A
- Grama Niladhari Division
- Interactive map of Thalangama North A
- Coordinates: 6.911468°N 79.933562°E
- Country: Sri Lanka
- Province: Western Province
- District: Colombo District
- Divisional Secretariat: Kaduwela Divisional Secretariat
- Electoral District: Colombo Electoral District
- Polling Division: Kaduwela Polling Division

Area
  - Total: 2.17 km^{2} (0.84 sq mi)
- Elevation: 25 m (82 ft)

Population (2012)
  - Total: 9,250
  - Density: 4,263/km^{2} (11,040/sq mi)
- ISO 3166 code: LK-1109150

Thalangama North A

Thalangama North A Grama Niladhari Division is a Grama Niladhari Division of the Kaduwela Divisional Secretariat of Colombo District of Western Province, Sri Lanka. It has Grama Niladhari Division Code 477.

Thalangama North A is a surrounded by the Udumulla South, Batapotha, Battaramulla North, Muttettugoda, Himbutana East, Udumulla, Walpola and Himbutana West Grama Niladhari Divisions.

== Demographics ==
=== Ethnicity ===
The Thalangama North A Grama Niladhari Division has a Sinhalese majority (96.4%). In comparison, the Kaduwela Divisional Secretariat (which contains the Thalangama North A Grama Niladhari Division) has a Sinhalese majority (95.6%)

Ethnicity in Thalangama North A
1. Sinhalese (96.4%)
2. Other (2.30%)
3. Sri Lankan Tamil (1.30%)

=== Religion ===
The Thalangama North A Grama Niladhari Division has a Buddhist majority (90.4%). In comparison, the Kaduwela Divisional Secretariat (which contains the Thalangama North A Grama Niladhari Division) has a Buddhist majority (90.4%)

Religion in Thalangama North A
1. Buddhist (90.4%)
2. Roman Catholic (4.40%)
3. Other Christian (2.80%)
4. Hindu (1.20%)
5. Muslim (1.00%)
6. Other (0.10%)
