= Mampe East Grama Niladhari Division =

Mampe East
- Grama Niladhari Division
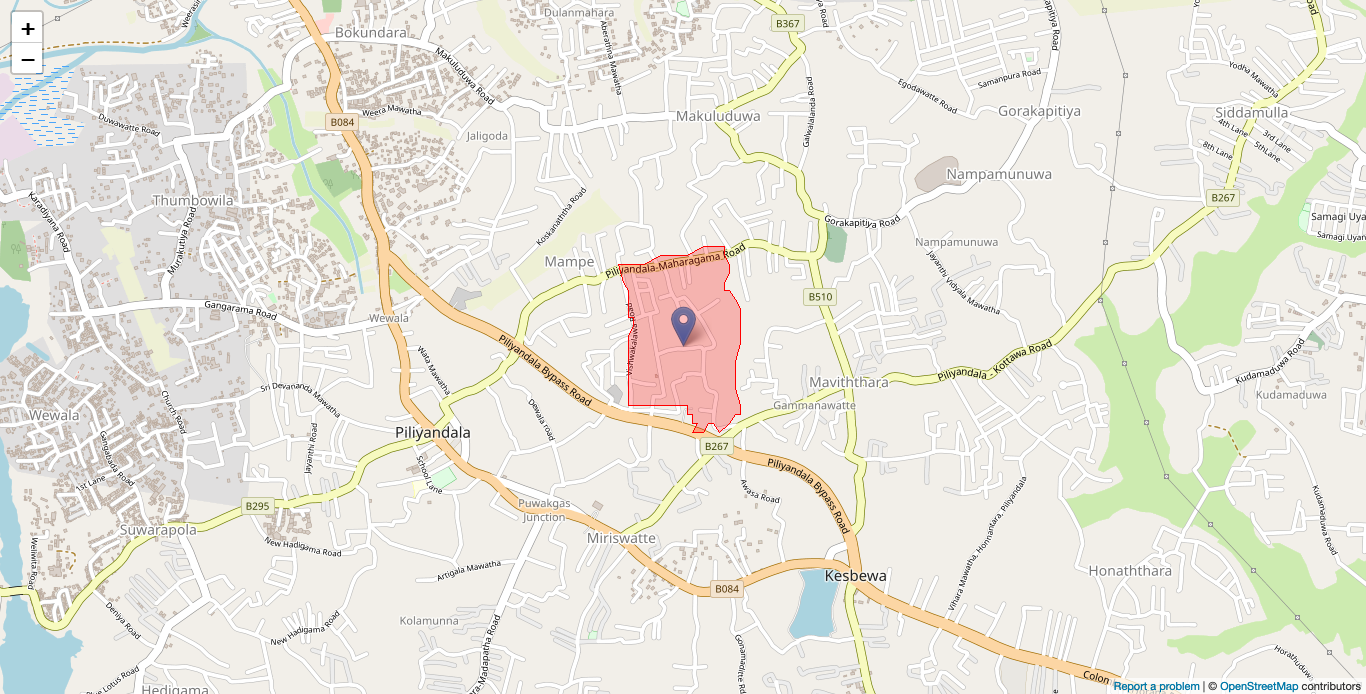
- Mampe East Grama Niladhari Division
- Coordinates: 6.805470°N 79.933430°E
- Country: Sri Lanka
- Province: Western Province
- District: Colombo District
- Divisional Secretariat: Kesbewa Divisional Secretariat
- Electoral District: Colombo Electoral District
- Polling Division: Kesbewa Polling Division

Area
  - Total: 0.44 km^{2} (0.17 sq mi)
- Elevation: 26 m (85 ft)

Population (2012)
  - Total: 2,040
  - Density: 4,636/km^{2} (12,010/sq mi)
- ISO 3166 code: LK-1136210

Mampe East Grama Niladhari Division is a Grama Niladhari Division of the Kesbewa Divisional Secretariat of Colombo District of Western Province, Sri Lanka . It has Grama Niladhari Division Code 574D.

Mampe East is a surrounded by the Mavittara South, Kesbewa North, Mampe West, Vishwakalawa, Mampe North and Mavittara North Grama Niladhari Divisions.

== Demographics ==
=== Ethnicity ===
The Mampe East Grama Niladhari Division has a Sinhalese majority (98.8%) . In comparison, the Kesbewa Divisional Secretariat (which contains the Mampe East Grama Niladhari Division) has a Sinhalese majority (97.3%)

Ethnicity in Mampe East
1. Sinhalese (98.8%)
2. Other (1.20%)

=== Religion ===
The Mampe East Grama Niladhari Division has a Buddhist majority (94.6%) . In comparison, the Kesbewa Divisional Secretariat (which contains the Mampe East Grama Niladhari Division) has a Buddhist majority (93.0%)

Religion in Mampe East
1. Buddhist (94.6%)
2. Roman Catholic (3.20%)
3. Other Christian (1.70%)
4. Other (0.50%)
