= Kaduwela Divisional Secretariat =

- Divisional Secretariat
- Location within Sri Lanka
- Country: Sri Lanka
- Province: Western Province
- District: Colombo District

Area
  - Total: 34 sq mi (88 km^{2})

Population (2012)
  - Total: 252,041
  - Density: 7,420/sq mi (2,864/km^{2})

Ethnicity (2012 census)
  - Sinhalese: 241,070(95.65%)
  - Sri Lankan Moors: 2,180 (0.86%)
  - Sri Lankan Tamil: 4,712(1.87%)
  - Indian Tamil: 626 (0.25%)
  - Other: 2,453 (0.97%)

Religion (2012 census)
  - Buddhist: 227,939(90.44%)
  - Islam: 3,735(1.48%)
  - Christian: 16,398(6.51%)
  - Hindu: 3,524(1.40%)
  - Other: 445(0.18%)
- Time zone: UTC+5:30 (Sri Lanka Standard Time)
- Website: http://www.kaduwela.ds.gov.lk

Kaduwela Divisional Secretariat is a Divisional Secretariat of Colombo District, of Western Province, Sri Lanka. This divisional Secretariat also encompasses the area of the Kaduwela Polling Division.

== List of divisions ==
- Arangala
- Korathota
- Malabe West
- Muttettugoda
- Pahala Bomiriya B
- Raggahawatta
- Subhoothipura
- Thalangama North A

== Demography ==
Religion in Kaduwela DS Division (2012)
1. Buddhist (90.4%)
2. Hindu (1.40%)
3. Muslim (1.50%)
4. Roman Catholic (5.00%)
5. Other Christian (1.50%)
6. Other (0.20%)
