= Kesbewa Divisional Secretariat =

- Divisional Secretariat
- Interactive map of Kesbewa Divisional Secretariat
- Country: Sri Lanka
- Province: Western Province
- District: Colombo District

Area
  - Total: 23.73 sq mi (61.45 km^{2})

Population (2024 census)
  - Total: 263,541
- Time zone: UTC+5:30 (Sri Lanka Standard Time)

Kesbewa Divisional Secretariat is a Divisional Secretariat of Colombo District, of Western Province, Sri Lanka.

== Demography ==
Religion in Kesbewa DS Division (2012)
1. Buddhist (93.0%)
2. Hindu (0.90%)
3. Muslim (0.90%)
4. Roman Catholic (3.40%)
5. Other Christian (1.70%)
6. Other (0.00%)

== List of divisions ==
- Mampe East Grama Niladhari Division
- Mampe West Grama Niladhari Division
- Vishwakalawa Grama Niladhari Division
