= Neville Fernando Teaching Hospital =

Neville Fernando Hospital
- SAITM (Pvt) Ltd
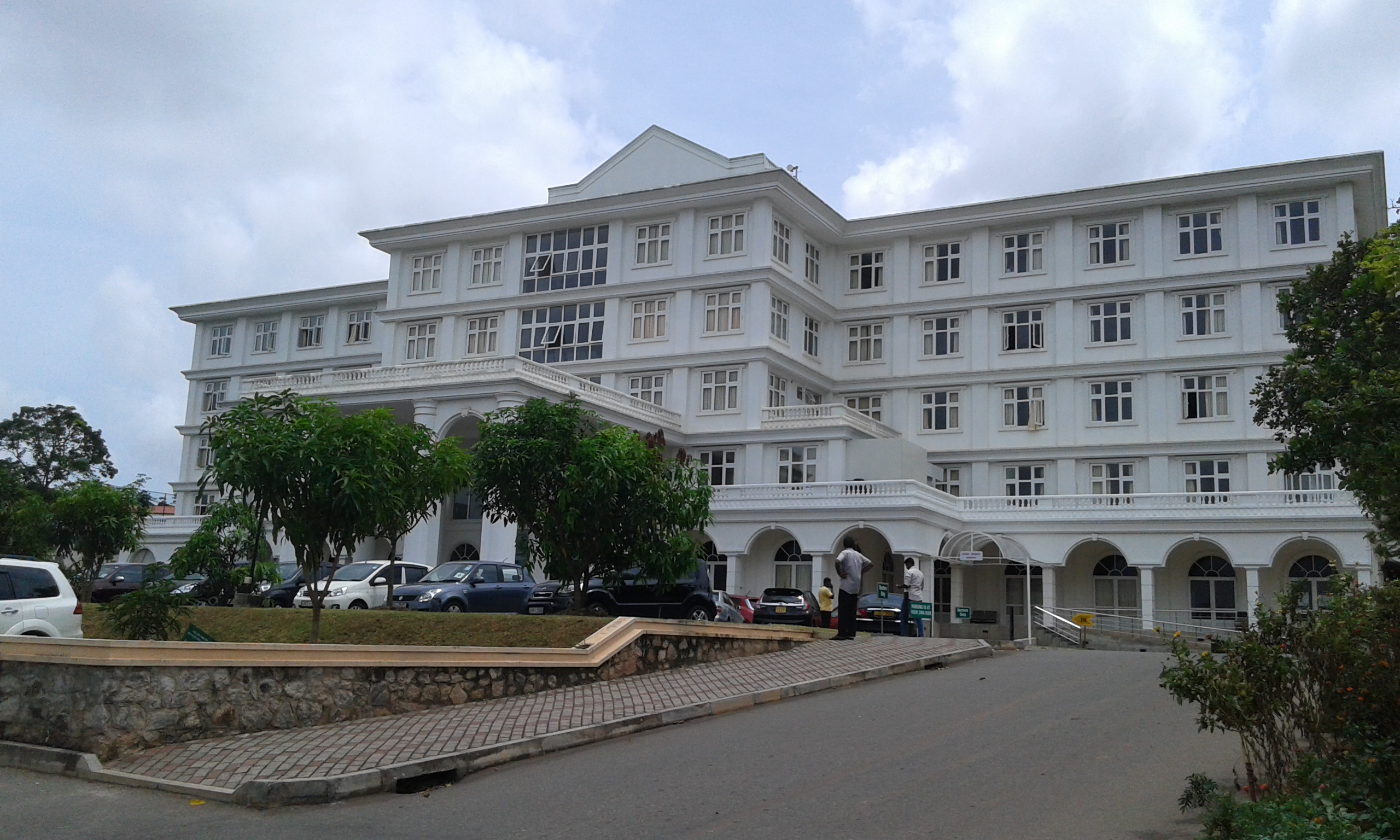
- Neville Fernando Hospital.

Geography
- Location: Malabe, Sri Lanka
- Coordinates: 6°54′13″N 79°57′17″E

Organisation
- Care system: Private
- Type: Private

Services
- Standards: Tertiary Care
- Emergency department: 24 Hrs Emergency services
- Beds: 210

History
- Founded: 2013; 13 years ago

Links
- Website: www.nfth.lk

Neville Fernando Hospital (also referred to as Dr Neville Fernando Sri Lanka – Russia Friendship Hospital or NFH) established in 2013 is a hi-tech multi speciality tertiary care teaching hospital. It is also one of the largest private hospital in Sri Lanka with 210 permanent beds and capable of accommodating about 1000 patients a day. It is the teaching hospital to the South Asian Institute of Technology and Medicine (SAITM) and is the first private teaching hospital in the country as well. NFH is located in Millennium Drive, off Chandrika Kumaratunga Mawatha, Malabe 10115. NFH is a brainchild of its Chairman Dr.Fernando and its main purposes are to provide clinical training facility for the medical students of the SAITM and to provide much sought after high quality private medical care to the Sri Lankan public at an affordable price.

== Facilities ==
Neville Fernando Hospital offers some of the latest facilities available healthcare. Medical investigations such as computerized tomography (CT scan), Magnetic Resonance Imaging (MRI), ultra sound scanning and all the other medical laboratory investigations could be performed at the NFH.
