= Malabe Boys' School =

Boys' Model School - Malabe

Location
- New Kandy Road, Malabe; Sri Lanka
- 6°54′14.4″N 79°57′26″E

Information
- Type: National
- Motto: "අත්තාහි අත්තනෝ නාථො"
- Established: 28 May 1987
- Founder: W.K.Depp
- Principal: Sisira Gunarathne
- Teaching staff: 140+
- Grades: Class 1 - 13
- Gender: Boys
- Age range: 6 to 19
- Enrollment: 5000+
- Houses: Gamunu; Thissa; Parakum; Vijaya
- Colors: Maroon and gold
- Affiliation: Buddhist

Boys' Model School, Malabe (ආදර්ශ පිරිමි විද්‍යාලය - මාලඹේ) is a Sri Lankan school for boys aged 6–19, serving classes 1–13. The school is situated in the vicinity of Malabe overlooking the Kaduwela – Battaramulla main road. The school is in the Kaduwela division and the Sri Jayawardhanapura zone. Current enrollment is approximately 4,000. (Sinhala / English).

== Early history ==
Boys' Model School - Malabe was inaugurated by then minister of education Ranil Wickramasinghe on 28 May 1987 with the invitation of then-member of Parliament Paul Perera. The school was named Boys’ Model School Malabe. W. K. Dep was the founder and the first principal of this school. There were two assistant teachers on his staff, D. Premarathne and R. D. J. Premalatha.

Initially, students were admitted to grade one classes only. By 1989 there were three grades in the school. By 1991, the school had become a complete primary school for classes from grades 1 to 5. To accommodate increased demand, a new three-story building, Lalith Ethulathmudali Hall, was completed on 1 May 1991.

In 1997, the first milestone of the school was celebrated by sixteen students sitting for the G.C.E. Ordinary Level examination for the first time in the history of the school. By then the school had been upgraded to a Kanishta Vidyalaya (junior school). When the school celebrated its tenth anniversary, another three-story building was declared open and an auditorium and a swimming pool were added to the school. Until then, the founding principal had chaired the school, but he had to leave the school as he was promoted to the director of English in the Western province. K. K. L. Siriwardhana assumed duties as the new principal of the Boys' Model school in 1998. Sisira Gunarathna is a former principal.

== Milestones ==
By the year 1996, the school had classes up to grade ten.

The school was promoted as a Maha Vidyalaya (high school) on 4 May 2007 and classified as a 1 –C school which has Advanced Level (A/L) classes in Commerce and Arts streams.

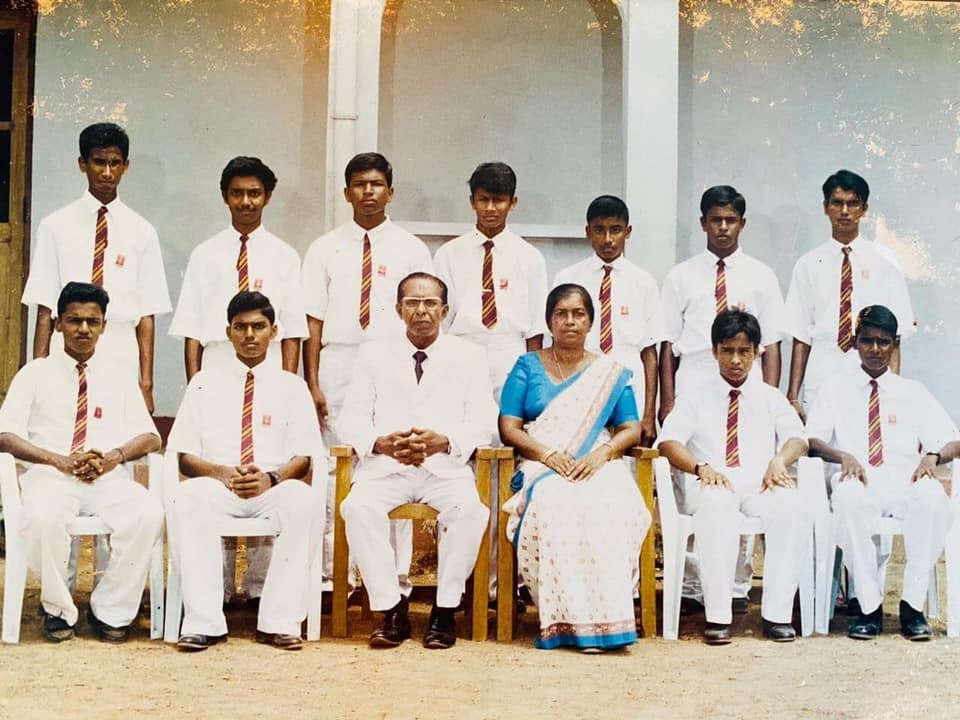
School first batch photo with Mr.Depp and Mrs.Latha

Boys' Model School - Malabe was selected as the cleanest school and awarded the Suvasara Thahshalava Award on 16 October 2003.

A computer laboratory opened on 2 August 2006. That same day an official website of the school was launched.

A science lab opened on 21 September 2007 so that the school could start teaching a science curriculum.

A Swimming Pool has been built in 2022 making Boys' Model School a prestigious school in the zone

A Technology faculty has been built in 2025 for the students who are studying technology and other subjects in that field.

== Houses ==
Every year the school organizes a sports event called "House Meeting", in which students are divided into four houses according to their relevant admission number (numbers that have been issued by the school for each student). House Meeting is usually held in February.

Each house has their own unique color.

- Vijaya --
- Gemunu --
- Perakum --
- Tissa --
