= Moratuwa Polling Division =

Moratuwa
- Polling Division
- Coordinates: 6.765242°N 79.890897°E
- Country: Sri Lanka
- Province: Western Province, Sri Lanka
- Electoral District: Colombo Electoral District

Area
  - Total: 20.75 km^{2} (8.01 sq mi)

Population (2012)
  - Total: 168,280
  - Density: 8,110/km^{2} (21,000/sq mi)
- ISO 3166 code: EC-01O

The Moratuwa Polling Division is a Polling Division in the Colombo Electoral District, in the Western Province, Sri Lanka.

== Presidential Election Results ==
=== Summary ===
The winner of Moratuwa has matched the final country result 9 out of 9 times. Hence, Moratuwa is a Perfect Bellwether for Presidential Elections.

Year	Moratuwa	Colombo Electoral District	MAE %	Sri Lanka	MAE %
2024	NPP	NPP	0.65%	NPP	2.33%
2019	SLPP	SLPP	4.29%	SLPP	5.23%
2015	NDF	NDF	5.33%	NDF	0.94%
2010	UPFA	UPFA	4.91%	UPFA	0.42%
2005	UPFA	UNP	4.17%	UPFA	1.68%
1999	PA	PA	2.56%	PA	1.02%
1994	PA	PA	0.74%	PA	1.69%
1988	UNP	UNP	0.40%	UNP	1.28%
1982	UNP	UNP	2.76%	UNP	1.12%
Matches/Mean MAE	9/9	8/9	2.96%	9/9	1.75%

=== 2024 Sri Lankan Presidential Election ===
Party	Moratuwa		Colombo Electoral District		Sri Lanka	
Party	Votes	%	Votes	%	Votes	%
NPP	45,299	47.79%	629,963	47.21%	5,634,915	42.31%
SJB	24,319	25.66%	342,108	25.64%	4,363,035	32.76%
Independant (Ranil Wickremesinghe)	19,025	20.07%	281,436	21.09%	2,299,767	17.21%
SLPP	2,843	3.00%	30,432	2.28%	342,781	2.57%
Other Parties (with < 1%)	2,182	3.48%	50,451	3.87%	679,118	5.09%
Valid Votes	82,631	95.69%	1,366,390	97.67%	13,319,616	97.80%
Rejected Votes	3,726	4.31%	31,796	2.33%	300,300	2.20%
Total Polled	86,357	71.69%	1,398,186	77.39%	13,619,916	79.46%
Registered Electors	120,462		1,765,351		17,140,354	

=== 2019 Sri Lankan Presidential Election ===
Party	Moratuwa		Colombo Electoral District		Sri Lanka	
Party	Votes	%	Votes	%	Votes	%
SLPP	57,645	57.83%	727,713	53.19%	6,924,255	52.25%
NDF	36,390	36.50%	559,921	40.92%	5,564,239	41.99%
NMPP	3,534	3.55%	53,803	3.93%	418,553	3.16%
Other Parties (with < 1%)	2,118	2.12%	26,740	1.95%	345,452	2.61%
Valid Votes	99,687	99.00%	1,368,177	98.89%	13,252,499	98.99%
Rejected Votes	1,008	1.00%	15,333	1.11%	135,452	1.01%
Total Polled	100,695	84.65%	1,383,510	82.82%	13,387,951	83.71%
Registered Electors	118,956		1,670,403		15,992,568	

=== 2020 Sri Lankan Parliamentary Election ===
Party	Moratuwa		Colombo Electoral District		Sri Lanka	
Party	Votes	%	Votes	%	Votes	%
SLPFA	55,000	63.54%	674,603	57.04%	6,853,693	59.09%
SJB	23,747	27.43%	387,145	32.73%	2,771,984	23.9%
JJB	4,404	5.09%	67,600	5.72%	445,958	3.84%
UNP	1,754	2.03%	30,875	2.61%	249,435	2.15%
Other Parties (with < 1%)	1,645	1.91%	22,553	1.9%	1,227,859	11.02%
Valid Votes	86,560	72.19%	1,182,776	69.2%	11,598,936	71.32%
Rejected Votes	5,895	4.92%	81,034	4.74%	744,373	4.58%
Total Polled	92,455	77.1%	1,263,810	73.94%	12,343,309	75.89%
Registered Electors	119,911		1,709,209		16,263,885	

=== 2015 Sri Lankan Presidential Election ===
Party	Moratuwa		Colombo Electoral District		Sri Lanka	
Party	Votes	%	Votes	%	Votes	%
NDF	48,599	50.63%	725,073	55.93%	6,217,162	51.28%
UPFA	46,885	48.85%	562,614	43.40%	5,768,090	47.58%
Other Parties (with < 1%)	497	0.52%	8,673	0.67%	138,200	1.14%
Valid Votes	95,981	99.01%	1,296,360	98.83%	12,123,452	98.85%
Rejected Votes	958	0.99%	15,334	1.17%	140,925	1.15%
Total Polled	96,939	84.13%	1,311,694	81.34%	12,264,377	78.69%
Registered Electors	115,219		1,612,660		15,585,942	

=== 2010 Sri Lankan Presidential Election ===
Party	Moratuwa		Colombo Electoral District		Sri Lanka	
Party	Votes	%	Votes	%	Votes	%
UPFA	52,627	57.99%	614,740	52.93%	6,015,934	57.88%
NDF	37,233	41.03%	533,022	45.90%	4,173,185	40.15%
Other Parties (with < 1%)	892	0.98%	13,620	1.17%	204,494	1.97%
Valid Votes	90,752	99.19%	1,161,382	99.03%	10,393,613	99.03%
Rejected Votes	745	0.81%	11,394	0.97%	101,838	0.97%
Total Polled	91,497	79.84%	1,172,776	76.09%	10,495,451	66.70%
Registered Electors	114,601		1,541,242		15,734,587	

=== 2005 Sri Lankan Presidential Election ===
Party	Moratuwa		Colombo Electoral District		Sri Lanka	
Party	Votes	%	Votes	%	Votes	%
UPFA	48,047	52.17%	534,431	47.96%	4,887,152	50.29%
UNP	43,207	46.92%	569,627	51.12%	4,706,366	48.43%
Other Parties (with < 1%)	835	0.91%	10,192	0.91%	123,521	1.27%
Valid Votes	92,089	98.95%	1,114,250	98.86%	9,717,039	98.88%
Rejected Votes	975	1.05%	12,879	1.14%	109,869	1.12%
Total Polled	93,064	80.39%	1,127,129	75.85%	9,826,908	69.51%
Registered Electors	115,759		1,486,021		14,136,979	

=== 1999 Sri Lankan Presidential Election ===
Party	Moratuwa		Colombo Electoral District		Sri Lanka	
Party	Votes	%	Votes	%	Votes	%
PA	41,380	52.16%	474,310	49.18%	4,312,157	51.12%
UNP	33,017	41.62%	425,185	44.08%	3,602,748	42.71%
JVP	3,692	4.65%	44,009	4.56%	343,927	4.08%
Other Parties (with < 1%)	1,238	1.56%	21,030	2.18%	176,679	2.09%
Valid Votes	79,327	97.53%	964,534	97.06%	8,435,754	97.69%
Rejected Votes	2,006	2.47%	29,197	2.94%	199,536	2.31%
Total Polled	81,333	77.11%	993,731	73.39%	8,635,290	72.17%
Registered Electors	105,483		1,354,025		11,965,536	

=== 1994 Sri Lankan Presidential Election ===
Party	Moratuwa		Colombo Electoral District		Sri Lanka	
Party	Votes	%	Votes	%	Votes	%
PA	45,403	64.26%	557,708	64.82%	4,709,205	62.28%
UNP	24,493	34.67%	288,741	33.56%	2,715,283	35.91%
Other Parties (with < 1%)	759	1.07%	13,937	1.62%	137,040	1.81%
Valid Votes	70,655	98.62%	860,386	98.17%	7,561,526	98.03%
Rejected Votes	988	1.38%	16,060	1.83%	151,706	1.97%
Total Polled	71,643	73.23%	876,446	69.59%	7,713,232	69.12%
Registered Electors	97,831		1,259,484		11,158,880	

=== 1988 Sri Lankan Presidential Election ===
Party	Moratuwa		Colombo Electoral District		Sri Lanka	
Party	Votes	%	Votes	%	Votes	%
UNP	31,546	48.77%	361,337	49.14%	2,569,199	50.43%
SLFP	29,654	45.84%	339,958	46.23%	2,289,857	44.95%
SLMP	3,488	5.39%	34,020	4.63%	235,701	4.63%
Valid Votes	64,688	98.51%	735,315	98.49%	5,094,754	98.24%
Rejected Votes	977	1.49%	11,295	1.51%	91,499	1.76%
Total Polled	65,665	67.81%	746,610	67.53%	5,186,256	55.87%
Registered Electors	96,841		1,105,583		9,283,143	

=== 1982 Sri Lankan Presidential Election ===
Party	Moratuwa		Colombo Electoral District		Sri Lanka	
Party	Votes	%	Votes	%	Votes	%
UNP	32,096	54.60%	436,290	57.86%	3,450,815	52.93%
SLFP	22,744	38.69%	274,476	36.40%	2,546,348	39.05%
JVP	2,625	4.47%	28,580	3.79%	273,428	4.19%
LSSP	1,137	1.93%	9,655	1.28%	58,531	0.90%
Other Parties (with < 1%)	180	0.31%	5,030	0.67%	190,929	2.93%
Valid Votes	58,782	98.81%	754,031	98.95%	6,520,156	98.78%
Rejected Votes	707	1.19%	7,990	1.05%	80,470	1.22%
Total Polled	59,489	74.09%	762,021	76.88%	6,600,626	80.15%
Registered Electors	80,297		991,194		8,235,358	

== Parliamentary Election Results ==
=== Summary ===
The winner of Moratuwa has matched the final country result 7 out of 7 times. Hence, Moratuwa is a Bellwether for Parliamentary Elections.

Year	Moratuwa	Colombo Electoral District	MAE %	Sri Lanka	MAE %
2015	UNP	UNP	4.55%	UNP	2.22%
2010	UPFA	UPFA	2.40%	UPFA	5.41%
2004	UPFA	UNP	3.56%	UPFA	1.72%
2001	UNP	UNP	3.59%	UNP	1.70%
2000	PA	UNP	2.57%	PA	1.76%
1994	PA	PA	3.04%	PA	4.83%
1989	UNP	UNP	4.38%	UNP	3.18%
Matches/Mean MAE	7/7	5/7	3.44%	7/7	2.97%

=== 2015 Sri Lankan Parliamentary Election ===
Party	Moratuwa		Colombo Electoral District		Sri Lanka	
Party	Votes	%	Votes	%	Votes	%
UNP	43,665	48.53%	640,743	53.04%	5,098,916	45.77%
UPFA	40,142	44.61%	474,063	39.25%	4,732,664	42.48%
JVP	5,384	5.98%	81,391	6.74%	544,154	4.88%
Other Parties (with < 1%)	785	0.87%	11,752	0.97%	93,045	0.84%
Valid Votes	89,976	96.72%	1,207,949	96.46%	11,140,333	95.35%
Rejected Votes	2,990	3.21%	43,372	3.46%	516,926	4.42%
Total Polled	93,031	80.74%	1,252,271	78.93%	11,684,111	77.66%
Registered Electors	115,219		1,586,598		15,044,490	

=== 2010 Sri Lankan Parliamentary Election ===
Party	Moratuwa		Colombo Electoral District		Sri Lanka	
Party	Votes	%	Votes	%	Votes	%
UPFA	40,369	54.20%	480,896	51.23%	4,846,388	60.38%
UNP	25,356	34.04%	339,750	36.19%	2,357,057	29.37%
DNA	8,159	10.95%	110,683	11.79%	441,251	5.50%
Other Parties (with < 1%)	600	0.81%	7,292	0.78%	48,240	0.60%
Valid Votes	74,484	95.20%	938,723	94.85%	8,026,322	96.03%
Rejected Votes	3,725	4.76%	50,354	5.09%	581,465	6.96%
Total Polled	78,242	68.27%	989,729	64.17%	8,358,246	59.29%
Registered Electors	114,601		1,542,457		14,097,690	

=== 2004 Sri Lankan Parliamentary Election ===
Party	Moratuwa		Colombo Electoral District		Sri Lanka	
Party	Votes	%	Votes	%	Votes	%
UPFA	38,833	44.45%	414,688	39.20%	4,223,126	45.70%
UNP	34,313	39.27%	441,841	41.77%	3,486,792	37.73%
JHU	13,493	15.44%	190,618	18.02%	552,723	5.98%
Other Parties (with < 1%)	730	0.84%	10,713	1.01%	90,868	0.98%
Valid Votes	87,369	96.52%	1,057,860	96.47%	9,241,931	94.52%
Rejected Votes	3,139	3.47%	38,605	3.52%	534,452	5.47%
Total Polled	90,515	77.73%	1,096,571	74.71%	9,777,821	75.74%
Registered Electors	116,454		1,467,751		12,909,631	

=== 2001 Sri Lankan Parliamentary Election ===
Party	Moratuwa		Colombo Electoral District		Sri Lanka	
Party	Votes	%	Votes	%	Votes	%
UNP	42,150	47.82%	546,417	51.62%	4,086,026	45.62%
PA	33,627	38.15%	353,401	33.39%	3,330,815	37.19%
JVP	9,932	11.27%	117,404	11.09%	815,353	9.10%
Other Parties (with < 1%)	1,274	1.45%	24,289	2.29%	510,616	5.70%
SU	1,161	1.32%	16,970	1.60%	50,665	0.57%
Valid Votes	88,144	96.40%	1,058,481	96.28%	8,955,844	94.77%
Rejected Votes	3,294	3.60%	40,901	3.72%	494,009	5.23%
Total Polled	91,438	79.22%	1,099,382	76.31%	9,449,878	76.03%
Registered Electors	115,430		1,440,682		12,428,762	

=== 2000 Sri Lankan Parliamentary Election ===
Party	Moratuwa		Colombo Electoral District		Sri Lanka	
Party	Votes	%	Votes	%	Votes	%
PA	36,883	43.63%	394,146	38.86%	3,899,329	45.33%
UNP	35,570	42.07%	440,684	43.45%	3,451,765	40.12%
JVP	6,849	8.10%	78,133	7.70%	518,725	6.03%
SU	3,721	4.40%	49,671	4.90%	127,859	1.49%
Other Parties (with < 1%)	1,522	1.80%	51,586	5.09%	375,083	4.36%
Valid Votes	84,545	N/A	1,014,220	N/A	8,602,617	N/A

=== 1994 Sri Lankan Parliamentary Election ===
Party	Moratuwa		Colombo Electoral District		Sri Lanka	
Party	Votes	%	Votes	%	Votes	%
PA	41,670	55.63%	469,642	50.94%	3,887,805	48.94%
UNP	30,360	40.53%	385,100	41.77%	3,498,370	44.04%
MEP	1,543	2.06%	42,734	4.64%	68,538	0.86%
SLPF	992	1.32%	11,454	1.24%	90,078	1.13%
Other Parties (with < 1%)	345	0.46%	13,003	1.41%	51,995	0.65%
Valid Votes	74,910	96.52%	921,933	96.18%	7,943,688	95.20%
Rejected Votes	2,701	3.48%	36,635	3.82%	400,395	4.80%
Total Polled	77,611	79.33%	958,568	76.04%	8,344,095	74.75%
Registered Electors	97,831		1,260,686		11,163,064	

=== 1989 Sri Lankan Parliamentary Election ===
Party	Moratuwa		Colombo Electoral District		Sri Lanka	
Party	Votes	%	Votes	%	Votes	%
UNP	33,090	53.97%	374,530	51.67%	2,838,005	50.71%
SLFP	22,024	35.92%	205,053	28.29%	1,785,369	31.90%
USA	3,796	6.19%	31,873	4.40%	141,983	2.54%
MEP	1,859	3.03%	76,966	10.62%	90,480	1.62%
Other Parties (with < 1%)	539	0.88%	36,420	5.02%	269,739	4.82%
Valid Votes	61,308	96.14%	724,842	95.36%	5,596,468	93.87%
Rejected Votes	2,463	3.86%	35,271	4.64%	365,563	6.13%
Total Polled	63,771	66.58%	760,113	69.87%	5,962,031	63.60%
Registered Electors	95,786		1,087,891		9,374,164	

== Demographics ==
=== Ethnicity ===
The Moratuwa Polling Division has a Sinhalese majority (94.3%) . In comparison, the Colombo Electoral District (which contains the Moratuwa Polling Division) has a Sinhalese majority (76.5%), a significant Moor population (10.7%) and a significant Sri Lankan Tamil population (10.1%)

Ethnicity in Moratuwa
1. Sinhalese (94.3%)
2. Sri Lankan Tamil (3.00%)
3. Moor (1.60%)
4. Other (1.10%)

=== Religion ===
The Moratuwa Polling Division has a Buddhist majority (68.2%) and a significant Roman Catholic population (19.8%) . In comparison, the Colombo Electoral District (which contains the Moratuwa Polling Division) has a Buddhist majority (70.2%) and a significant Muslim population (11.8%)

Religion in Moratuwa
1. Buddhist (68.2%)
2. Roman Catholic (19.8%)
3. Other Christian (7.80%)
4. Hindu (2.10%)
5. Muslim (2.00%)
6. Other (0.10%)
