= Moratuwa Divisional Secretariat =

- Divisional Secretariat
- Interactive map of Moratuwa Divisional Secretariat
- Country: Sri Lanka
- Province: Western Province
- District: Colombo District

Area
  - Total: 7.47 sq mi (19.34 km^{2})

Population (2024 census)
  - Total: 160,199
- Time zone: UTC+5:30 (Sri Lanka Standard Time)

Moratuwa Divisional Secretariat is a Divisional Secretariat of Colombo District, of Western Province, Sri Lanka.

== Demography ==
Religion in Moratuwa DS Division (2012)
1. Buddhist (68.2%)
2. Hindu (2.10%)
3. Muslim (2.00%)
4. Roman Catholic (19.8%)
5. Other Christian (7.80%)
6. Other (0.10%)
