= Piliyandala Clock Tower =

Coordinates: 6°48′4″N 79°55′22″E

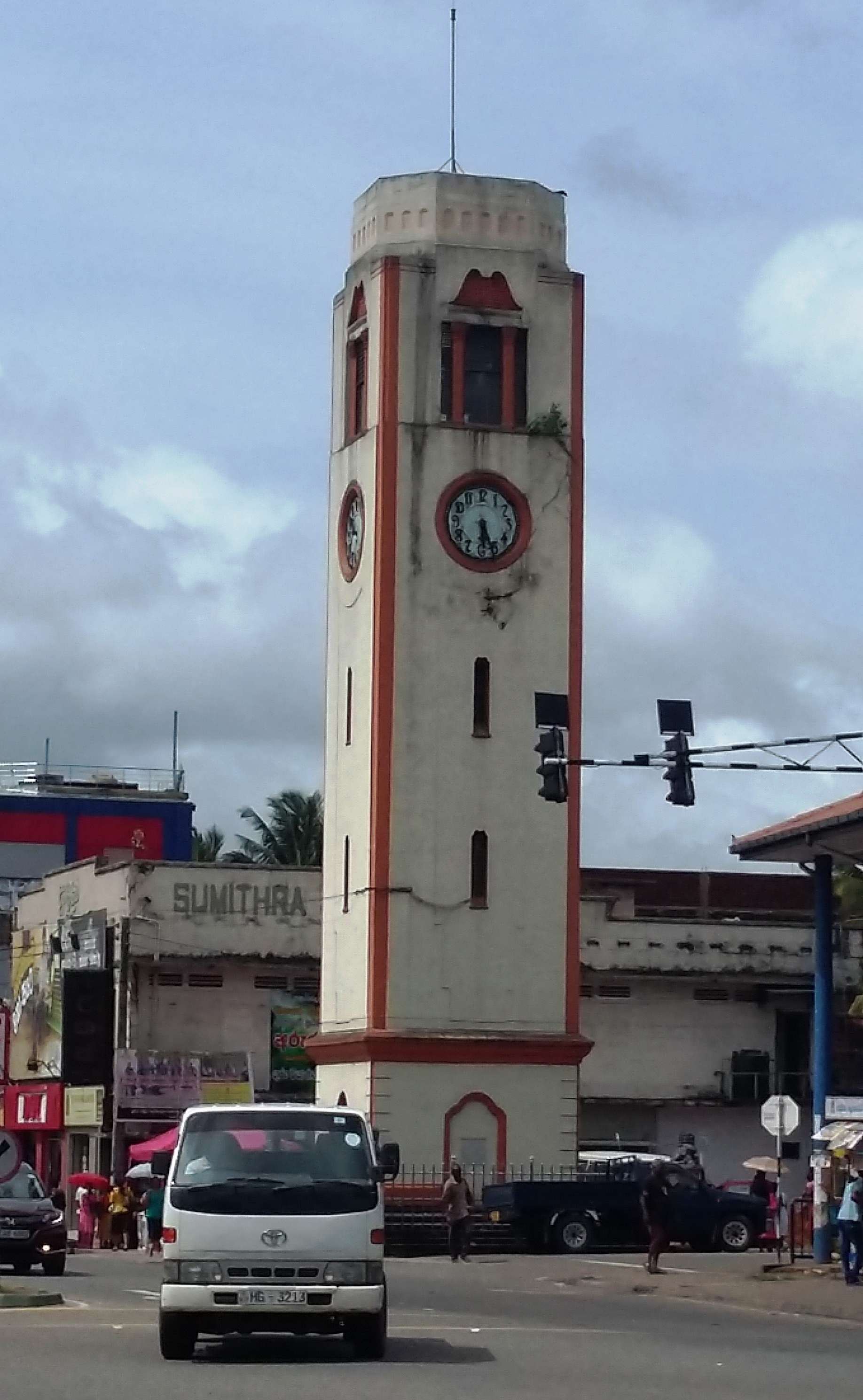
- Interactive map of the Piliyandala Clock Tower area

General information
- Type: Clock tower
- Location: Piliyandala, Sri Lanka
- Construction started: 11 September 1952
- Completed: 30 April 1953

Height
- Height: 24m

The Piliyandala Clock Tower is located in the Piliyandala, Sri Lanka. The clock tower is a popular landmark of the Piliyandala. According to local residents and documentation, this clock tower is one of the tallest on the island rising to a height of 23.8 m (78 ft) with a 4.9 m (16 ft) girth. Having existed for over sixty years, the clock tower is considered to be of considerable archaeological value; thus, the tower provides the Piliyandala town with historical significance.

== History ==
D. Simon Samarakoon erected the clock tower in memory of his father, Cornelis Wijewickrema Samarakoon, and his mother. The foundation stone for the erection of the clock tower was laid by the Minister of Local Government C. W. W. Kannangara on 11 September 1952. The construction was completed in seven months and the clock tower was commissioned on 30 April 1953, and has been running ever since.

== Features ==
The three-tiered clock tower was constructed with brick and cement and has a concrete layer on the topmost floor. The top floor is accessible via an iron staircase within the tower. At the top of the iron staircase, there is a box (1.52m x 1.2m) which houses the clock's three operating machines. These three winding-mechanisms simultaneously operate with a key once a week to power the clock. Each of the four faces of the clock is over 1.52 m (5 ft 0 in) wide.

The minute hand is two-and-half feet long while the hour-hand is 0.61 m (2 ft 0 in) in length. A 0.3 m (1 ft 0 in) broad round butte' hangs from a five-foot long supporting bar. The clock tower is also equipped with three large chimes, each 0.92 m (3 ft 0 in) tall and 0.61 m (2 ft 0 in) broad to announce the hour.
