= Kesbewa Polling Division =

Kesbewa
- Polling Division
- Coordinates: 6.814773°N 79.926797°E
- Country: Sri Lanka
- Province: Western Province, Sri Lanka
- Electoral District: Colombo Electoral District

Area
  - Total: 66.25 km^{2} (25.58 sq mi)

Population (2012)
  - Total: 245,232
  - Density: 3,702/km^{2} (9,590/sq mi)
- ISO 3166 code: EC-01N

The Kesbewa Polling Division is a Polling Division in the Colombo Electoral District, in the Western Province, Sri Lanka.

== Presidential Election Results ==
=== Summary ===
The winner of Kesbewa has matched the final country result 5 out of 8 times. Hence, Kesbewa is a Weak Bellwether for Presidential Elections.

Year	Kesbewa	Colombo Electoral District	MAE %	Sri Lanka	MAE %
2019	SLPP	SLPP	14.04%	SLPP	15.02%
2015	UPFA	NDF	10.99%	NDF	6.57%
2010	UPFA	UPFA	11.90%	UPFA	6.65%
2005	UPFA	UNP	12.69%	UPFA	10.17%
1999	PA	PA	8.03%	PA	6.50%
1994	PA	PA	5.07%	PA	7.48%
1988	SLFP	UNP	8.72%	UNP	9.93%
1982	SLFP	UNP	10.98%	UNP	7.13%
Matches/Mean MAE	5/8	7/8	10.30%	8/8	8.68%

=== 2019 Sri Lankan Presidential Election ===
Party	Kesbewa		Colombo Electoral District		Sri Lanka	
Party	Votes	%	Votes	%	Votes	%
SLPP	99,062	67.68%	727,713	53.19%	6,924,255	52.25%
NDF	37,430	25.57%	559,921	40.92%	5,564,239	41.99%
NMPP	7,343	5.02%	53,803	3.93%	418,553	3.16%
Other Parties (with < 1%)	2,525	1.73%	26,740	1.95%	345,452	2.61%
Valid Votes	146,360	99.02%	1,368,177	98.89%	13,252,499	98.99%
Rejected Votes	1,444	0.98%	15,333	1.11%	135,452	1.01%
Total Polled	147,804	84.54%	1,383,510	82.82%	13,387,951	83.71%
Registered Electors	174,829		1,670,403		15,992,568	

=== 2015 Sri Lankan Presidential Election ===
Party	Kesbewa		Colombo Electoral District		Sri Lanka	
Party	Votes	%	Votes	%	Votes	%
UPFA	74,189	54.56%	562,614	43.40%	5,768,090	47.58%
NDF	61,116	44.94%	725,073	55.93%	6,217,162	51.28%
Other Parties (with < 1%)	678	0.50%	8,673	0.67%	138,200	1.14%
Valid Votes	135,983	98.99%	1,296,360	98.83%	12,123,452	98.85%
Rejected Votes	1,393	1.01%	15,334	1.17%	140,925	1.15%
Total Polled	137,376	83.37%	1,311,694	81.34%	12,264,377	78.69%
Registered Electors	164,774		1,612,660		15,585,942	

=== 2010 Sri Lankan Presidential Election ===
Party	Kesbewa		Colombo Electoral District		Sri Lanka	
Party	Votes	%	Votes	%	Votes	%
UPFA	77,474	65.10%	614,740	52.93%	6,015,934	57.88%
NDF	40,474	34.01%	533,022	45.90%	4,173,185	40.15%
Other Parties (with < 1%)	1,058	0.89%	13,620	1.17%	204,494	1.97%
Valid Votes	119,006	99.33%	1,161,382	99.03%	10,393,613	99.03%
Rejected Votes	803	0.67%	11,394	0.97%	101,838	0.97%
Total Polled	119,809	80.57%	1,172,776	76.09%	10,495,451	66.70%
Registered Electors	148,696		1,541,242		15,734,587	

=== 2005 Sri Lankan Presidential Election ===
Party	Kesbewa		Colombo Electoral District		Sri Lanka	
Party	Votes	%	Votes	%	Votes	%
UPFA	66,660	60.82%	534,431	47.96%	4,887,152	50.29%
UNP	42,042	38.36%	569,627	51.12%	4,706,366	48.43%
Other Parties (with < 1%)	900	0.82%	10,192	0.91%	123,521	1.27%
Valid Votes	109,602	99.00%	1,114,250	98.86%	9,717,039	98.88%
Rejected Votes	1,110	1.00%	12,879	1.14%	109,869	1.12%
Total Polled	110,712	79.03%	1,127,129	75.85%	9,826,908	69.51%
Registered Electors	140,094		1,486,021		14,136,979	

=== 1999 Sri Lankan Presidential Election ===
Party	Kesbewa		Colombo Electoral District		Sri Lanka	
Party	Votes	%	Votes	%	Votes	%
PA	51,240	57.17%	474,310	49.18%	4,312,157	51.12%
UNP	31,302	34.93%	425,185	44.08%	3,602,748	42.71%
JVP	5,236	5.84%	44,009	4.56%	343,927	4.08%
SMBP	940	1.05%	8,209	0.85%	35,854	0.43%
Other Parties (with < 1%)	905	1.01%	12,821	1.33%	140,825	1.67%
Valid Votes	89,623	96.80%	964,534	97.06%	8,435,754	97.69%
Rejected Votes	2,967	3.20%	29,197	2.94%	199,536	2.31%
Total Polled	92,590	76.00%	993,731	73.39%	8,635,290	72.17%
Registered Electors	121,836		1,354,025		11,965,536	

=== 1994 Sri Lankan Presidential Election ===
Party	Kesbewa		Colombo Electoral District		Sri Lanka	
Party	Votes	%	Votes	%	Votes	%
PA	54,327	70.03%	557,708	64.82%	4,709,205	62.28%
UNP	22,130	28.53%	288,741	33.56%	2,715,283	35.91%
Other Parties (with < 1%)	1,121	1.44%	13,937	1.62%	137,040	1.81%
Valid Votes	77,578	98.53%	860,386	98.17%	7,561,526	98.03%
Rejected Votes	1,159	1.47%	16,060	1.83%	151,706	1.97%
Total Polled	78,737	70.97%	876,446	69.59%	7,713,232	69.12%
Registered Electors	110,948		1,259,484		11,158,880	

=== 1988 Sri Lankan Presidential Election ===
Party	Kesbewa		Colombo Electoral District		Sri Lanka	
Party	Votes	%	Votes	%	Votes	%
SLFP	35,184	55.88%	339,958	46.23%	2,289,857	44.95%
UNP	25,549	40.58%	361,337	49.14%	2,569,199	50.43%
SLMP	2,228	3.54%	34,020	4.63%	235,701	4.63%
Valid Votes	62,961	98.62%	735,315	98.49%	5,094,754	98.24%
Rejected Votes	879	1.38%	11,295	1.51%	91,499	1.76%
Total Polled	63,840	71.51%	746,610	67.53%	5,186,256	55.87%
Registered Electors	89,277		1,105,583		9,283,143	

=== 1982 Sri Lankan Presidential Election ===
Party	Kesbewa		Colombo Electoral District		Sri Lanka	
Party	Votes	%	Votes	%	Votes	%
SLFP	26,553	47.92%	274,476	36.40%	2,546,348	39.05%
UNP	25,576	46.16%	436,290	57.86%	3,450,815	52.93%
JVP	2,248	4.06%	28,580	3.79%	273,428	4.19%
LSSP	851	1.54%	9,655	1.28%	58,531	0.90%
Other Parties (with < 1%)	179	0.32%	5,030	0.67%	190,929	2.93%
Valid Votes	55,407	99.05%	754,031	98.95%	6,520,156	98.78%
Rejected Votes	530	0.95%	7,990	1.05%	80,470	1.22%
Total Polled	55,937	78.78%	762,021	76.88%	6,600,626	80.15%
Registered Electors	71,002		991,194		8,235,358	

== Parliamentary Election Results ==
=== Summary ===
The winner of Kesbewa has matched the final country result 6 out of 7 times, showing that Kesbewa is a strong Bellwether for Parliamentary Elections.

Year	Kesbewa	Colombo Electoral District	MAE %	Sri Lanka	MAE %
2015	UPFA	UNP	12.30%	UNP	7.02%
2010	UPFA	UPFA	10.91%	UPFA	3.71%
2004	UPFA	UNP	10.88%	UPFA	6.46%
2001	UNP	UNP	6.84%	UNP	2.54%
2000	PA	UNP	5.35%	PA	2.08%
1994	PA	PA	6.90%	PA	8.80%
1989	UNP	UNP	7.81%	UNP	6.32%
Matches/Mean MAE	6/7	5/7	8.71%	7/7	5.28%

=== 2020 Sri Lankan Parliamentary Election ===
Party	Kesbewa		Colombo Electoral District		Sri Lanka	
Party	Votes	%	Votes	%	Votes	%
SLPFA	89,240	70.77%	674,603	57.04%	6,853,693	59.09%
SJB	23,687	18.78%	387,145	32.73%	2,771,984	23.9%
JJB	9,160	7.26%	67,600	5.72%	445,958	3.84%
UNP	2,098	1.66%	30,875	2.61%	249,435	2.15%
Other Parties (with < 1%)	1,918	1.53%	22,553	1.9%	1,227,859	11.02%
Valid Votes	126,103	70.34%	1,182,776	69.2%	11,598,936	71.32%
Rejected Votes	6,760	3.77%	81,034	4.74%	744,373	4.58%
Total Polled	132,863	74.11%	1,263,810	73.94%	12,343,309	75.89%
Registered Electors	179,289		1,709,209		16,263,885	

=== 2015 Sri Lankan Parliamentary Election ===
Party	Kesbewa		Colombo Electoral District		Sri Lanka	
Party	Votes	%	Votes	%	Votes	%
UPFA	65,243	51.30%	474,063	39.25%	4,732,664	42.48%
UNP	49,637	39.03%	640,743	53.04%	5,098,916	45.77%
JVP	11,193	8.80%	81,391	6.74%	544,154	4.88%
Other Parties (with < 1%)	1,110	0.87%	11,752	0.97%	93,045	0.84%
Valid Votes	127,183	97.32%	1,207,949	96.46%	11,140,333	95.35%
Rejected Votes	3,452	2.64%	43,372	3.46%	516,926	4.42%
Total Polled	130,692	79.32%	1,252,271	78.93%	11,684,111	77.66%
Registered Electors	164,774		1,586,598		15,044,490	

=== 2010 Sri Lankan Parliamentary Election ===
Party	Kesbewa		Colombo Electoral District		Sri Lanka	
Party	Votes	%	Votes	%	Votes	%
UPFA	60,139	62.57%	480,896	51.23%	4,846,388	60.38%
UNP	21,953	22.84%	339,750	36.19%	2,357,057	29.37%
DNA	13,532	14.08%	110,683	11.79%	441,251	5.50%
Other Parties (with < 1%)	493	0.51%	7,292	0.78%	48,240	0.60%
Valid Votes	96,117	95.79%	938,723	94.85%	8,026,322	96.03%
Rejected Votes	4,160	4.15%	50,354	5.09%	581,465	6.96%
Total Polled	100,339	67.48%	989,729	64.17%	8,358,246	59.29%
Registered Electors	148,696		1,542,457		14,097,690	

=== 2004 Sri Lankan Parliamentary Election ===
Party	Kesbewa		Colombo Electoral District		Sri Lanka	
Party	Votes	%	Votes	%	Votes	%
UPFA	45,939	44.63%	414,688	39.20%	4,223,126	45.70%
JHU	29,850	29.00%	190,618	18.02%	552,723	5.98%
UNP	26,302	25.55%	441,841	41.77%	3,486,792	37.73%
Other Parties (with < 1%)	846	0.82%	10,713	1.01%	90,868	0.98%
Valid Votes	102,937	97.32%	1,057,860	96.47%	9,241,931	94.52%
Rejected Votes	2,831	2.68%	38,605	3.52%	534,452	5.47%
Total Polled	105,773	77.05%	1,096,571	74.71%	9,777,821	75.74%
Registered Electors	137,285		1,467,751		12,909,631	

=== 2001 Sri Lankan Parliamentary Election ===
Party	Kesbewa		Colombo Electoral District		Sri Lanka	
Party	Votes	%	Votes	%	Votes	%
UNP	42,260	42.54%	546,417	51.62%	4,086,026	45.62%
PA	37,815	38.07%	353,401	33.39%	3,330,815	37.19%
JVP	16,045	16.15%	117,404	11.09%	815,353	9.10%
SU	2,170	2.18%	16,970	1.60%	50,665	0.57%
Other Parties (with < 1%)	1,049	1.06%	24,289	2.29%	510,616	5.70%
Valid Votes	99,339	96.73%	1,058,481	96.28%	8,955,844	94.77%
Rejected Votes	3,356	3.27%	40,901	3.72%	494,009	5.23%
Total Polled	102,695	78.05%	1,099,382	76.31%	9,449,878	76.03%
Registered Electors	131,571		1,440,682		12,428,762	

=== 2000 Sri Lankan Parliamentary Election ===
Party	Kesbewa		Colombo Electoral District		Sri Lanka	
Party	Votes	%	Votes	%	Votes	%
PA	41,977	44.40%	394,146	38.86%	3,899,329	45.33%
UNP	34,978	37.00%	440,684	43.45%	3,451,765	40.12%
JVP	10,219	10.81%	78,133	7.70%	518,725	6.03%
SU	6,211	6.57%	49,671	4.90%	127,859	1.49%
Other Parties (with < 1%)	1,148	1.21%	51,586	5.09%	375,083	4.36%
Valid Votes	94,533	N/A	1,014,220	N/A	8,602,617	N/A

=== 1994 Sri Lankan Parliamentary Election ===
Party	Kesbewa		Colombo Electoral District		Sri Lanka	
Party	Votes	%	Votes	%	Votes	%
PA	49,342	59.16%	469,642	50.94%	3,887,805	48.94%
UNP	29,585	35.47%	385,100	41.77%	3,498,370	44.04%
MEP	2,709	3.25%	42,734	4.64%	68,538	0.86%
SLPF	1,418	1.70%	11,454	1.24%	90,078	1.13%
Other Parties (with < 1%)	349	0.42%	13,003	1.41%	51,995	0.65%
Valid Votes	83,403	96.60%	921,933	96.18%	7,943,688	95.20%
Rejected Votes	2,932	3.40%	36,635	3.82%	400,395	4.80%
Total Polled	86,335	77.82%	958,568	76.04%	8,344,095	74.75%
Registered Electors	110,948		1,260,686		11,163,064	

=== 1989 Sri Lankan Parliamentary Election ===
Party	Kesbewa		Colombo Electoral District		Sri Lanka	
Party	Votes	%	Votes	%	Votes	%
UNP	27,415	45.83%	374,530	51.67%	2,838,005	50.71%
SLFP	25,830	43.18%	205,053	28.29%	1,785,369	31.90%
MEP	4,351	7.27%	76,966	10.62%	90,480	1.62%
USA	1,890	3.16%	31,873	4.40%	141,983	2.54%
Other Parties (with < 1%)	339	0.57%	36,420	5.02%	269,739	4.82%
Valid Votes	59,825	95.67%	724,842	95.36%	5,596,468	93.87%
Rejected Votes	2,710	4.33%	35,271	4.64%	365,563	6.13%
Total Polled	62,535	71.38%	760,113	69.87%	5,962,031	63.60%
Registered Electors	87,609		1,087,891		9,374,164	

== Demographics ==
=== Ethnicity ===
The Kesbewa Polling Division has a Sinhalese majority (97.3%) . In comparison, the Colombo Electoral District (which contains the Kesbewa Polling Division) has a Sinhalese majority (76.5%), a significant Moor population (10.7%) and a significant Sri Lankan Tamil population (10.1%)

Ethnicity in Kesbewa
1. Sinhalese (97.3%)
2. Other (1.60%)
3. Sri Lankan Tamil (1.10%)

=== Religion ===
The Kesbewa Polling Division has a Buddhist majority (93.0%) . In comparison, the Colombo Electoral District (which contains the Kesbewa Polling Division) has a Buddhist majority (70.2%) and a significant Muslim population (11.8%)

Religion in Kesbewa
1. Buddhist (93.0%)
2. Roman Catholic (3.40%)
3. Other (1.80%)
4. Other Christian (1.70%)
