= Kaduwela Polling Division =

Kaduwela
- Polling Division
- Coordinates: 6.902157°N 79.978949°E
- Country: Sri Lanka
- Province: Western Province, Sri Lanka
- Electoral District: Colombo Electoral District

Area
  - Total: 93.17 km^{2} (35.97 sq mi)

Population (2012)
  - Total: 252,041
  - Density: 2,705/km^{2} (7,010/sq mi)
- ISO 3166 code: EC-01J

The Kaduwela Polling Division is a Polling Division in the Colombo Electoral District, in the Western Province, Sri Lanka.

== Presidential Election Results ==
=== Summary ===
The winner of Kaduwela has matched the final country result 6 out of 8 times. Hence, Kaduwela is a Weak Bellwether for Presidential Elections.

Year	Kaduwela	Colombo Electoral District	MAE %	Sri Lanka	MAE %
2019	SLPP	SLPP	11.96%	SLPP	12.95%
2015	UPFA	NDF	6.95%	NDF	2.55%
2010	UPFA	UPFA	9.07%	UPFA	3.84%
2005	UPFA	UNP	9.75%	UPFA	7.24%
1999	PA	PA	6.64%	PA	5.08%
1994	PA	PA	2.72%	PA	5.16%
1988	SLFP	UNP	8.04%	UNP	9.26%
1982	UNP	UNP	8.13%	UNP	4.30%
Matches/Mean MAE	6/8	7/8	7.91%	8/8	6.30%

=== 2019 Sri Lankan Presidential Election ===
Party	Kaduwela		Colombo Electoral District		Sri Lanka	
Party	Votes	%	Votes	%	Votes	%
SLPP	98,807	65.35%	727,713	53.19%	6,924,255	52.25%
NDF	41,747	27.61%	559,921	40.92%	5,564,239	41.99%
NMPP	7,605	5.03%	53,803	3.93%	418,553	3.16%
Other Parties (with < 1%)	3,029	2.00%	26,740	1.95%	345,452	2.61%
Valid Votes	151,188	99.02%	1,368,177	98.89%	13,252,499	98.99%
Rejected Votes	1,498	0.98%	15,333	1.11%	135,452	1.01%
Total Polled	152,686	83.08%	1,383,510	82.82%	13,387,951	83.71%
Registered Electors	183,787		1,670,403		15,992,568	

=== 2015 Sri Lankan Presidential Election ===
Party	Kaduwela		Colombo Electoral District		Sri Lanka	
Party	Votes	%	Votes	%	Votes	%
UPFA	70,970	50.46%	562,614	43.40%	5,768,090	47.58%
NDF	68,886	48.98%	725,073	55.93%	6,217,162	51.28%
Other Parties (with < 1%)	786	0.56%	8,673	0.67%	138,200	1.14%
Valid Votes	140,642	98.92%	1,296,360	98.83%	12,123,452	98.85%
Rejected Votes	1,534	1.08%	15,334	1.17%	140,925	1.15%
Total Polled	142,176	82.01%	1,311,694	81.34%	12,264,377	78.69%
Registered Electors	173,355		1,612,660		15,585,942	

=== 2010 Sri Lankan Presidential Election ===
Party	Kaduwela		Colombo Electoral District		Sri Lanka	
Party	Votes	%	Votes	%	Votes	%
UPFA	76,103	62.24%	614,740	52.93%	6,015,934	57.88%
NDF	45,082	36.87%	533,022	45.90%	4,173,185	40.15%
Other Parties (with < 1%)	1,091	0.89%	13,620	1.17%	204,494	1.97%
Valid Votes	122,276	99.31%	1,161,382	99.03%	10,393,613	99.03%
Rejected Votes	850	0.69%	11,394	0.97%	101,838	0.97%
Total Polled	123,126	77.57%	1,172,776	76.09%	10,495,451	66.70%
Registered Electors	158,736		1,541,242		15,734,587	

=== 2005 Sri Lankan Presidential Election ===
Party	Kaduwela		Colombo Electoral District		Sri Lanka	
Party	Votes	%	Votes	%	Votes	%
UPFA	65,829	57.84%	534,431	47.96%	4,887,152	50.29%
UNP	47,025	41.32%	569,627	51.12%	4,706,366	48.43%
Other Parties (with < 1%)	951	0.84%	10,192	0.91%	123,521	1.27%
Valid Votes	113,805	98.95%	1,114,250	98.86%	9,717,039	98.88%
Rejected Votes	1,209	1.05%	12,879	1.14%	109,869	1.12%
Total Polled	115,014	77.48%	1,127,129	75.85%	9,826,908	69.51%
Registered Electors	148,435		1,486,021		14,136,979	

=== 1999 Sri Lankan Presidential Election ===
Party	Kaduwela		Colombo Electoral District		Sri Lanka	
Party	Votes	%	Votes	%	Votes	%
PA	50,535	55.24%	474,310	49.18%	4,312,157	51.12%
UNP	32,951	36.02%	425,185	44.08%	3,602,748	42.71%
JVP	6,170	6.74%	44,009	4.56%	343,927	4.08%
Other Parties (with < 1%)	918	1.00%	12,821	1.33%	140,825	1.67%
SMBP	916	1.00%	8,209	0.85%	35,854	0.43%
Valid Votes	91,490	97.31%	964,534	97.06%	8,435,754	97.69%
Rejected Votes	2,530	2.69%	29,197	2.94%	199,536	2.31%
Total Polled	94,020	74.55%	993,731	73.39%	8,635,290	72.17%
Registered Electors	126,119		1,354,025		11,965,536	

=== 1994 Sri Lankan Presidential Election ===
Party	Kaduwela		Colombo Electoral District		Sri Lanka	
Party	Votes	%	Votes	%	Votes	%
PA	51,876	67.44%	557,708	64.82%	4,709,205	62.28%
UNP	23,475	30.52%	288,741	33.56%	2,715,283	35.91%
Other Parties (with < 1%)	1,566	2.04%	13,937	1.62%	137,040	1.81%
Valid Votes	76,917	98.16%	860,386	98.17%	7,561,526	98.03%
Rejected Votes	1,445	1.84%	16,060	1.83%	151,706	1.97%
Total Polled	78,362	69.24%	876,446	69.59%	7,713,232	69.12%
Registered Electors	113,173		1,259,484		11,158,880	

=== 1988 Sri Lankan Presidential Election ===
Party	Kaduwela		Colombo Electoral District		Sri Lanka	
Party	Votes	%	Votes	%	Votes	%
SLFP	30,600	55.06%	339,958	46.23%	2,289,857	44.95%
UNP	22,872	41.15%	361,337	49.14%	2,569,199	50.43%
SLMP	2,108	3.79%	34,020	4.63%	235,701	4.63%
Valid Votes	55,580	98.57%	735,315	98.49%	5,094,754	98.24%
Rejected Votes	806	1.43%	11,295	1.51%	91,499	1.76%
Total Polled	56,386	64.30%	746,610	67.53%	5,186,256	55.87%
Registered Electors	87,693		1,105,583		9,283,143	

=== 1982 Sri Lankan Presidential Election ===
Party	Kaduwela		Colombo Electoral District		Sri Lanka	
Party	Votes	%	Votes	%	Votes	%
UNP	27,963	48.80%	436,290	57.86%	3,450,815	52.93%
SLFP	25,275	44.11%	274,476	36.40%	2,546,348	39.05%
JVP	3,338	5.83%	28,580	3.79%	273,428	4.19%
Other Parties (with < 1%)	721	1.26%	14,685	1.95%	249,460	3.83%
Valid Votes	57,297	98.76%	754,031	98.95%	6,520,156	98.78%
Rejected Votes	719	1.24%	7,990	1.05%	80,470	1.22%
Total Polled	58,016	79.47%	762,021	76.88%	6,600,626	80.15%
Registered Electors	73,006		991,194		8,235,358	

== Parliamentary Election Results ==
=== Summary ===
The winner of Kaduwela has matched the final country result 6 out of 7 times. Hence, Kaduwela is a Bellwether for Parliamentary Elections.

Year	Kaduwela	Colombo Electoral District	MAE %	Sri Lanka	MAE %
2015	UPFA	UNP	8.78%	UNP	3.64%
2010	UPFA	UPFA	8.73%	UPFA	2.49%
2004	UPFA	UNP	8.93%	UPFA	5.36%
2001	UNP	UNP	6.99%	UNP	2.72%
2000	PA	UNP	5.55%	PA	1.70%
1994	PA	PA	4.76%	PA	6.76%
1989	UNP	UNP	6.24%	UNP	4.76%
Matches/Mean MAE	6/7	5/7	7.14%	7/7	3.92%

=== 2020 Sri Lankan Parliamentary Election ===
Party	Kaduwela		Colombo Electoral District		Sri Lanka	
Party	Votes	%	Votes	%	Votes	%
SLPFA	90,489	70.27%	674,603	57.04%	6,853,693	59.09%
SJB	23,797	18.48%	387,145	32.73%	2,771,984	23.9%
JJB	9,594	7.45%	67,600	5.72%	445,958	3.84%
UNP	2,679	2.08%	30,875	2.61%	249,435	2.15%
Other Parties (with < 1%)	2,211	1.72%	22,553	1.9%	1,227,859	11.02%
Valid Votes	128,770	68.32%	1,182,776	69.2%	11,598,936	71.32%
Rejected Votes	6,845	3.63%	81,034	4.74%	744,373	4.58%
Total Polled	135,615	71.96%	1,263,810	73.94%	12,343,309	75.89%
Registered Electors	188,469		1,709,209		16,263,885	

=== 2015 Sri Lankan Parliamentary Election ===
Party	Kaduwela		Colombo Electoral District		Sri Lanka	
Party	Votes	%	Votes	%	Votes	%
UPFA	62,136	47.29%	474,063	39.25%	4,732,664	42.48%
UNP	56,154	42.74%	640,743	53.04%	5,098,916	45.77%
JVP	11,971	9.11%	81,391	6.74%	544,154	4.88%
Other Parties (with < 1%)	1,128	0.86%	11,752	0.97%	93,045	0.84%
Valid Votes	131,389	97.30%	1,207,949	96.46%	11,140,333	95.35%
Rejected Votes	3,536	2.62%	43,372	3.46%	516,926	4.42%
Total Polled	135,029	77.89%	1,252,271	78.93%	11,684,111	77.66%
Registered Electors	173,355		1,586,598		15,044,490	

=== 2010 Sri Lankan Parliamentary Election ===
Party	Kaduwela		Colombo Electoral District		Sri Lanka	
Party	Votes	%	Votes	%	Votes	%
UPFA	56,539	59.39%	480,896	51.23%	4,846,388	60.38%
UNP	23,546	24.73%	339,750	36.19%	2,357,057	29.37%
DNA	14,460	15.19%	110,683	11.79%	441,251	5.50%
Other Parties (with < 1%)	652	0.68%	7,292	0.78%	48,240	0.60%
Valid Votes	95,197	95.72%	938,723	94.85%	8,026,322	96.03%
Rejected Votes	4,193	4.22%	50,354	5.09%	581,465	6.96%
Total Polled	99,450	62.65%	989,729	64.17%	8,358,246	59.29%
Registered Electors	158,736		1,542,457		14,097,690	

=== 2004 Sri Lankan Parliamentary Election ===
Party	Kaduwela		Colombo Electoral District		Sri Lanka	
Party	Votes	%	Votes	%	Votes	%
UPFA	53,065	50.50%	414,688	39.20%	4,223,126	45.70%
UNP	32,772	31.19%	441,841	41.77%	3,486,792	37.73%
JHU	18,485	17.59%	190,618	18.02%	552,723	5.98%
Other Parties (with < 1%)	749	0.71%	10,713	1.01%	90,868	0.98%
Valid Votes	105,071	96.94%	1,057,860	96.47%	9,241,931	94.52%
Rejected Votes	3,316	3.06%	38,605	3.52%	534,452	5.47%
Total Polled	108,393	75.46%	1,096,571	74.71%	9,777,821	75.74%
Registered Electors	143,644		1,467,751		12,909,631	

=== 2001 Sri Lankan Parliamentary Election ===
Party	Kaduwela		Colombo Electoral District		Sri Lanka	
Party	Votes	%	Votes	%	Votes	%
UNP	43,330	42.60%	546,417	51.62%	4,086,026	45.62%
PA	39,238	38.58%	353,401	33.39%	3,330,815	37.19%
JVP	16,602	16.32%	117,404	11.09%	815,353	9.10%
SU	1,541	1.52%	16,970	1.60%	50,665	0.57%
Other Parties (with < 1%)	1,001	0.98%	24,289	2.29%	510,616	5.70%
Valid Votes	101,712	96.93%	1,058,481	96.28%	8,955,844	94.77%
Rejected Votes	3,218	3.07%	40,901	3.72%	494,009	5.23%
Total Polled	104,930	77.41%	1,099,382	76.31%	9,449,878	76.03%
Registered Electors	135,550		1,440,682		12,428,762	

=== 2000 Sri Lankan Parliamentary Election ===
Party	Kaduwela		Colombo Electoral District		Sri Lanka	
Party	Votes	%	Votes	%	Votes	%
PA	43,474	45.15%	394,146	38.86%	3,899,329	45.33%
UNP	35,792	37.17%	440,684	43.45%	3,451,765	40.12%
JVP	11,268	11.70%	78,133	7.70%	518,725	6.03%
SU	4,701	4.88%	49,671	4.90%	127,859	1.49%
Other Parties (with < 1%)	1,047	1.09%	51,586	5.09%	375,083	4.36%
Valid Votes	96,282	N/A	1,014,220	N/A	8,602,617	N/A

=== 1994 Sri Lankan Parliamentary Election ===
Party	Kaduwela		Colombo Electoral District		Sri Lanka	
Party	Votes	%	Votes	%	Votes	%
PA	46,899	55.97%	469,642	50.94%	3,887,805	48.94%
UNP	30,668	36.60%	385,100	41.77%	3,498,370	44.04%
MEP	4,327	5.16%	42,734	4.64%	68,538	0.86%
SLPF	1,541	1.84%	11,454	1.24%	90,078	1.13%
Other Parties (with < 1%)	357	0.43%	13,003	1.41%	51,995	0.65%
Valid Votes	83,792	96.53%	921,933	96.18%	7,943,688	95.20%
Rejected Votes	3,010	3.47%	36,635	3.82%	400,395	4.80%
Total Polled	86,802	76.70%	958,568	76.04%	8,344,095	74.75%
Registered Electors	113,173		1,260,686		11,163,064	

=== 1989 Sri Lankan Parliamentary Election ===
Party	Kaduwela		Colombo Electoral District		Sri Lanka	
Party	Votes	%	Votes	%	Votes	%
UNP	25,849	45.47%	374,530	51.67%	2,838,005	50.71%
SLFP	21,306	37.48%	205,053	28.29%	1,785,369	31.90%
MEP	7,241	12.74%	76,966	10.62%	90,480	1.62%
USA	1,850	3.25%	31,873	4.40%	141,983	2.54%
Other Parties (with < 1%)	602	1.06%	36,420	5.02%	269,739	4.82%
Valid Votes	56,848	95.83%	724,842	95.36%	5,596,468	93.87%
Rejected Votes	2,473	4.17%	35,271	4.64%	365,563	6.13%
Total Polled	59,321	68.95%	760,113	69.87%	5,962,031	63.60%
Registered Electors	86,029		1,087,891		9,374,164	

== Demographics ==
=== Ethnicity ===
The Kaduwela Polling Division has a Sinhalese majority (95.6%) . In comparison, the Colombo Electoral District (which contains the Kaduwela Polling Division) has a Sinhalese majority (76.5%), a significant Moor population (10.7%) and a significant Sri Lankan Tamil population (10.1%)

Ethnicity in Kaduwela
1. Sinhalese (95.6%)
2. Other (2.50%)
3. Sri Lankan Tamil (1.90%)

=== Religion ===
The Kaduwela Polling Division has a Buddhist majority (90.4%) . In comparison, the Colombo Electoral District (which contains the Kaduwela Polling Division) has a Buddhist majority (70.2%) and a significant Muslim population (11.8%)

Religion in Kaduwela
1. Buddhist (90.4%)
2. Roman Catholic (5.00%)
3. Other Christian (1.50%)
4. Muslim (1.50%)
5. Hindu (1.40%)
6. Other (0.20%)
