= Colombo District =

Colombo District කොළඹ දිස්ත්‍රික්කය கொழும்பு மாவட்டம்
- Administrative District
- Location within Sri Lanka
- Coordinates: 06°52′N 80°01′E
- Country: Sri Lanka
- Province: Western
- Capital: Colombo
- DS Division: List: Colombo; Homagama; Kaduwela; Kesbewa; Kolonnawa; Maharagama; Moratuwa; Padukka; Ratmalana; Seethawaka; Sri Jayawardenepura Kotte; Thimbirigasyaya

Government
  - District Secretary: Pradeep Yasaratne

Area
  - Total: 699 km^{2} (270 sq mi)
  - Land: 676 km^{2} (261 sq mi)
  - Water: 23 km^{2} (8.9 sq mi) 3.29%
  - Rank: 25th (1.07% of total area)

Population (2012 census)
  - Total: 2,309,809
  - Rank: 1st (11.40% of total pop.)
  - Density: 3,420/km^{2} (8,850/sq mi)

Ethnicity (2012 census)
  - Sinhalese: 1,771,319 (76.69%)
  - Sri Lankan Moors: 242,728 (10.51%)
  - Sri Lankan Tamil: 231,318 (10.01%)
  - Indian Tamil: 27,336 (1.18%)
  - Other: 37,108 (1.61%)

Religion (2012 census)
  - Buddhist: 1,631,999 (70.66%)
  - Muslim: 271,719 (11.76%)
  - Christian: 220,711 (9.56%)
  - Hindu: 182,342 (7.89%)
  - Other: 3,038 (0.13%)
- Time zone: UTC+05:30 (Sri Lanka)
- Post Codes: 00000-10999
- Telephone Codes: 011, 036
- ISO 3166 code: LK-11
- Vehicle registration: WP
- Official Languages: Sinhala, Tamil
- Website: Colombo District Secretariat

Colombo District (Sinhala: කොළඹ දිස්ත්‍රික්කය kol̠am̆ba distrikkaya; Tamil: கொழும்பு மாவட்டம் Koḻumpu Māvaṭṭam) is one of the 25 districts of Sri Lanka, the second level administrative division of the country. The district is administered by a District Secretariat headed by a District Secretary (previously known as a Government Agent) appointed by the central government of Sri Lanka. The capital of the district is the city of Colombo. The district of Colombo was officially recorded in 2016 as having the highest income on average, per household. There are smaller places like Kottawa

== History ==
Colombo District was part of the pre-colonial Kingdom of Kotte. The district then came under Portuguese, Dutch and British control. In 1815 the British gained control of the entire island of Ceylon. They divided the island into three ethnic based administrative structures: Low Country Sinhalese, Kandyan Sinhalese and Tamil. Colombo District was part of the Low Country Sinhalese administration. In 1833, in accordance with the recommendations of the Colebrooke-Cameron Commission, the ethnic based administrative structures were unified into a single administration divided into five geographic provinces. Colombo District, together with Kalutara, Puttalam, Seven Korales (present day Kurunegala District), Three Korales, Four Korales and Lower Bulatgama (present day Kegalle District) formed the new Western Province. At the time that Ceylon gained independence, Colombo was one of the two districts located in the Western Province. Parts of the district were transferred to newly created Gampaha District in September 1978.

== Geography ==
Colombo District is located in the south west of Sri Lanka and has an area of 699 square kilometres (270 sq mi).

== Administrative units ==
Colombo District is divided into 13 Divisional Secretary's Division (DS Divisions), each headed by a Divisional Secretary (previously known as an Assistant Government Agent). The DS Divisions are further sub-divided into 566 Grama Niladhari Divisions (GN Divisions).

DS Division	Main Town	Divisional Secretary	GN Divisions	Area (km^{2})
Colombo	Colombo	N. H. Rathnayake	35	18
Dehiwala	Dehiwala-Mount Lavinia	K. Champa N. Perera	15	8
Homagama	Homagama		81	121
Kaduwela	Kaduwela	M. S. P. Suriyapperuma	57	88
Kesbewa	Kesbewa	L. A. Kalukapuarachchi	73	64
Kolonnawa	Kolonnawa	U. W. Senarathna	46	28
Maharagama	Maharagama	K. M. Buddhi Tharanga Karunasena	41	38
Moratuwa	Moratuwa	K. C. Niroshan	42	20
Padukka	Padukka	S. H. Hewage	46	110
Ratmalana	Dehiwala-Mount Lavinia	Pradeep Ratnayaka	13	13
Seethawaka	Avissawella	P. D. S. Wijerathna	68	150
Sri Jayawardenepura Kotte	Sri Jayawardenepura Kotte	Amal J. S. S. Edirisooriya	20	17
Thimbirigasyaya	Colombo	Geethamani C. Karunaratne	29	24
Total			566	699

== Cities and Towns ==
Largest cities or towns in Western Province, Sri Lanka As per the 2012 Census
Rank		Pop.
1	Colombo	693,593
2	Kaduwela	252,041
3	Dehiwala-Mount Lavinia	233,290
4	Maharagama	196,423
5	Moratuwa	191,634
6	Kesbewa	185,122
7	Sri Jayawardenepura Kotte	125,270
8	Boralesgamuwa	60,110
9	Kolonnawa	60,044
10	Avissawella	30,308

== Demographics ==
=== Population ===
Colombo District's population was 2,309,809 in 2012. It has the highest population and population density in Sri Lanka. The majority of the population are Sinhalese, with a minority Sri Lankan Moor and Sri Lankan Tamil population.

=== Ethnicity ===
Ethnicity in Colombo District (2024)
1. Sinhala (76.1%)
2. Sri Lankan Moors (12.0%)
3. Sri Lankan Tamils (10.3%)
4. Others (1.61%)

Population of Colombo District by ethnic group 1946 to 2012
Year	Sinhalese		Sri Lankan Moors		Sri Lankan Tamil		Indian Tamil		Other		Total No.
Year	No.	%	No.	%	No.	%	No.	%	No.	%	Total No.
1946 Census	n/a	n/a	n/a	n/a	n/a	n/a	n/a	n/a	n/a	n/a	1,420,332
1953 Census	n/a	n/a	n/a	n/a	n/a	n/a	n/a	n/a	n/a	n/a	1,708,726
1963 Census	n/a	n/a	n/a	n/a	n/a	n/a	n/a	n/a	n/a	n/a	2,207,420
1971 Census	n/a	n/a	n/a	n/a	n/a	n/a	n/a	n/a	n/a	n/a	2,672,620
1981 Census (Note: Gampaha District was carved out of Colombo District in 1978.)	1,318,835	77.61%	139,743	8.22%	170,590	10.04%	19,824	1.17%	50,249	2.96%	1,699,241
2001 Census	1,724,459	76.60%	202,731	9.01%	247,739	11.00%	24,821	1.10%	51,524	2.29%	2,251,274
2012 Census	1,771,319	76.69%	242,728	10.51%	231,318	10.01%	27,336	1.18%	37,108	1.61%	2,309,809

DS Division	Population (2012 Census)						Population Density (/km^{2})
DS Division	Sinhalese	Sri Lankan Moors	Sri Lankan Tamil	Indian Tamil	Other	Total	Population Density (/km^{2})
Colombo	79,468	126,345	97,690	8,635	5,910	318,048	17,669
Dehiwala	53,182	17,870	12,917	1,240	2,625	87,834	10,979
Homagama	231,878	508	1,907	460	1,426	236,179	1,952
Kaduwela	241,104	2,011	4,605	740	3,597	252,057	2,864
Kesbewa	237,781	1,114	2,403	439	2,325	244,062	3,813
Kolonnawa	128,623	40,412	15,934	2,101	3,747	190,817	6,815
Maharagama	187,363	1,369	3,107	529	2,987	195,355	5,141
Moratuwa	157,901	2,683	4,802	397	1,377	167,160	8,358
Padukka	62,472	998	1,238	334	125	65,167	592
Ratmalana	75,181	9,005	7,852	855	2,269	95,162	7,320
Seethawaka	100,046	838	5,007	7,285	301	113,477	757
Sri Jayawardenepura Kotte	91,268	5,207	7,503	801	2,729	107,508	6,324
Thimbirigasyaya	125,052	34,368	66,353	3,520	7,690	236,983	9,874
Total	1,771,319	242,728	231,318	27,336	37,108	2,309,809	3,304

=== Religion ===
Religion in Colombo district (2024)
Religion	Percent
Buddhism	70.83%
Islam	12.56%
Hinduism	8.33%
Catholicism	5.89%
Other Christianity	2.34%
Other or not stated	0.05%

Population of Colombo District by religion 1981 to 2012
Year	Buddhist		Muslim		Christian (Note: Roman Catholic and Other Christian.)		Hindu		Other		Total No.
Year	No.	%	No.	%	No.	%	No.	%	No.	%	Total No.
1981 Census	1,196,964	70.44%	168,863	9.94%	200,545	11.80%	130,215	7.66%	2,654	0.16%	1,699,241
2001 Census	1,578,248	70.10%	241,944	10.75%	233,254	10.36%	194,743	8.65%	3,085	0.14%	2,251,274
2012 Census	1,631,999	70.66%	271,719	11.76%	220,711	9.56%	182,342	7.89%	3,038	0.13%	2,309,809
