= List of Archaeological Protected Monuments in Colombo District =

This is a list of Archaeological Protected Monuments in Colombo District, Sri Lanka.

Monument	Image	Location	Grama Niladhari Division	Divisional Secretary's Division	Registered	Description	Refs
Akarawita Raja Maha Vihara			No. 434 Akarawita	Hanwella	6 June 2008	The drip ledged rock caves	
Alakeshwara Archaeological Site		Sri Jayawardenepura Kotte		Kotte			
House belonging to G. S. Dabaree (bearing Assessment No. 184)			Colombo central, East	Colombo	23 February 2007	K. B. Cristee Pereira Mawatha	
Tunnel at Kotte Ananda Sastralaya		Sri Jayawardenepura Kotte		Kotte	27 June 1952		
Moat		Sri Jayawardenepura Kotte		Kotte	12 August 1971	Moat located in lot numbers from 115, 116, 119 to 126, 155, 156 and from 158 to 160 depicted in sheet No. 13 and lot numbers from 49, 50, 52, 53, 58, 60 to 63, 71, 72 depicted in sheet No. 17 and lot numbers from 60, 62, 63, 66 to 68 depicted in sheet No. 18 of Kotte Town Survey Plan No. 62	
Andudola Kanda Archaeological ruins		Nawagamuwa South	No. 470 A/O/Nawagamuwa	Kaduwela	30 December 2011	Drip-ledged cave and the two natural caves with pre-historic features in the Eastern Slope of the mountain	
Asmandala cave			No. 435 Kahatapitiya	Hanwella	6 June 2008		
Balapokuna Raja Maha Vihara		Pamankada	Pamankada East	Thimbirigasyaya	6 June 2008	Pond	
Bans Hall				Thimbirigasyaya	6 July 2007	Old house situated in the land called Bans Hall in Bans place	
Canal around the old Dutch fort				Hanwella	18 August 2006	Parts of the canal	
Cargills building				Colombo	9 December 2011	No. 40/1, York Street, Colombo 01	
Central Kovil, rest hall and road		Kotahena		Colombo	22 November 2002	Jinthupitiya road	
Christ Church Cemetery		Dehiwala-Mount Lavinia		Ratmalana	6 June 2008	Four engraved tombs in the Christian cemetery	
Clifan Burg House		Colombo		Colombo	21 January 2000	At Sri Lanka Navy Headquarters	
Colombo Chartered Bank Building		Colombo		Colombo	21 January 2000	Janadipathi Street	
Colombo Dutch Museum		Pettah		Colombo	18 June 1999		
Colombo Methodist Church		Dam Street	Pettah (GND No. 522)	Colombo	17 May 2013		
Colombo Port Custom building		Colombo		Colombo	21 January 2000	At Sri Lanka Ports Authority premises	
Colombo Port Lighthouse (North)		Colombo		Colombo	21 January 2000	At Sri Lanka Ports Authority premises	
Colombo Port Lighthouse (North western)		Colombo		Colombo	21 January 2000	At Sri Lanka Ports Authority premises	
Colombo Port ruins of rampart		Colombo		Colombo	21 January 2000	At Sri Lanka Ports Authority premises	
Former General Post Office, Colombo		Colombo		Colombo	21 January 2000	17 Janadhipathi Mawatha	
Darly Building			Suduwella	Thimbirigasyaya	23 February 2007	Building known as “Darly Building” in which presently the Office of Lanka Sama Samaja Party bearing Assessment No. 456 of Dr. Kolvin R. De Silva Mawatha	
Deepaduththarama Vihara		Kotahena		Colombo	18 June 1999		
Delft Gate			Colombo Fort	Colombo	9 December 2011	Bristol Street	
Dutch store room		Colombo Fort		Colombo	18 June 1999	At Sri Lanka Ports Authority land premises	
Elihouse water tanks			Elihouse No. 521/3	Modara	25 March 2016		
Embulgama Raja Maha Vihara			Henpita	Homagama	6 July 2007	Two caves with drip-ledges in the Udamaluwa and Awasage in the Pahatha Maluwa	
Ethul Kotte rampart and inner moat ruins		Ethul Kotte	No. 521	Nugegoda	23 February 2007	Rampart and extent of five feet of land from the rampart bounded in the north by lot numbers 89, 90, 129, 127, 126, 125, 124, 123, 122, 121, 120, 119, 116 and 115 and externally bounded on the South by Lot numbers 160, 158, 156, 155, 131, 132, 133 and 134 and inner moat in Kotte situated in Lot Numbers 87, 88, 139 and 159 and depicted in sheet number 13 of the Kotte town Survey Plan 87, 88, 139 and 159 and depicted in sheet No. 13 of Kotte Town Survey Plan No. 62	
Ethul Kotte rampart ruins		Ethul Kotte	No. 521	Nugegoda	23 February 2007	Rampart and extent of five feet from the rampart bounded internally by Lot Numbers 116, 117, 113, 112, 110, 64, 63, 62, 61, 45, 46, 47, 48, 49, 50, 51, 52, 53, 54, 33, 31, 30, 29, 28 and 26 and the rampart an extent of ten from the rampart externally bounded by Lot Numbers 27, 55, 56, 57, 58, 59, 60, 111, 114 and 115 and depicted in sheet No. 13 of Kotte Town Survey Plan No. 62; The rampart and 5 feet of land from the rampart internally bounded by Lot No. 90, 85, 84 and 349 and the rampart and an extent of 10 feet from the rampart externally bounded by Lots 87, 86 and 360 depicted in sheet 13 of Kotte Town Survey Plan No. 62; Rampart and an extent 5 feet internally bounded by Lot Nos. 39, 33 and 81 and situated across Lot No. 284, 285, 287, 288, 280, 279, 278, 277, 276, 191, 192, 185, 137, 138, 131, 127, 141 and 40 and the rampart and an extent of 10 feet from the rampart externally bounded by Lots 136, 133 and situated across Lot Nos. 287, 282, 281, 277, 278, 290, 189 and 186 and depicted in Sheet No. 1111 of Kotte Town Survey Plan No. 62; Rampart and an extent of 5 feet from the rampart situated across lot Nos. 349, 344, 343, 342, 94, 93, 57 and 61, 62, 63, 65, 55 and 03 internally bounded by Lot No. 11 and the rampart and an extent of 10 feet from the rampart externally bounded Lot Nos. 350, 352, 57, 56, 02 and 07 depicted in Sheet No. 11 of Kotte Town Survey Plan No. 62; Rampart and an extent of 5 feet from the rampart situated across Lot Nos. 11, 54, 53, 52, 51, 50, 49, 71, 59, 46 and 45, 44, 43, 42, 72 and 69 internally bounded by Lot No. 81 and the rampart and an extent of 10 feet from the rampart externally bounded by Lot Nos. 93, 18, 48, 73, 74, 75 and 80 depicted in Sheet No. 06 of Kotte Town Survey Plan No. 622	
Fellows Lelah house			Milagiriya	Thimbirigasyaya	23 January 2009	House called 'Fellows Lelah' (bearing Assessment No. 9) situated at Asoka Udyanaya	
Gaffoor Building		Colombo Fort		Colombo		Main street	
Galkissa Samudrasanna Vihara		Dehiwala-Mount Lavinia	No. 546-A Wedikanda	Ratmalana	6 June 2008	Buddhist shrine	
Giraimbula wooden bridge			No. 435 A Giraimbula	Hanwella	6 June 2008	The portions of the bridge	
Gotami Vihara		Gothamipura	No. 87 Gotamipura	Thimbirigasyaya	6 July 2007	Viharageya with paintings and sculptures	
Grand Oriental Hotel		Colombo		Colombo	21 January 2000	York street	
Hokandara Purana Vihara			Hokandara-North	Kaduwela	17 May 2013	The image house and the belfry	
Hulftsdorp court complex			Hulftsdorp West and Keselwatta	Colombo	22 July 2011	The buildings in which the High Court, District Court and the Commercial Court are being held situated in the Hulftsdorp High Court premises	
Jawatta Cemetery		Havelock Town		Thimbirigasyaya	8 July 2005	Old stone tomb slabs and the well	
Jayasekararama Vihara		Kuppiyawatta		Colombo	18 June 1999	Image house, Awasa house and Devalaya	
Jubilee Post		Mirihana		Nugegoda	8 July 2005	Jubilee Post junction	
Kayman's Gate		Dematagoda		Colombo	21 January 2000	Dutch bell tower at Kayman's Gate	
Koholankanda Forest Hermitage			No. 439 Diddeniya North	Hanwella	23 January 2009	The drip ledged cave vihare, the Buddha Bhikkus residence together with the attached drip ledged cave	
Koratota Raja Maha Vihara		Koratota		Kaduwela	22 November 2002	Caves with drip ledges and Stone inscriptions	
Kshetrarama Maha Vihara		Lakshapathiya		Moratuwa		Old Buddha shrine, two storied Seema Malaka, Dwellings	
Kuragala rock				Padukka	6 July 2007	The natural cave with characteristics of pre-historic human settlements in the Kuragala mountain	
Lambrick Hall		Sri Jayawardenepura Kotte		Kotte		The old Lambrick hall building at Sri Jayawardenepura Maha Vidyalaya	
Lanka Maccanance Macancy company limited Building		Colombo		Colombo	21 January 2000	Lady Bastian Mawatha	
Maha Bodhi Vihara, Maligakanda		Maligakanda		Colombo	18 June 1999		
Maligawatta Muslim Cemetery			Maligawatta	Colombo	6 July 2007	The burial place of the person named Hussein Lebbe and the tomb of person called Masthan Mawlana and the octagonal tomb	
Maligawatta railway premises		Maligawatta		Colombo	16 February 2009	Office Complex, Drivers' old Lounge, Old crane building, Dhāvanāgāra building, 4 of Old water tank and Railway engine weighing building	
Maradana railway station store room		Maradana		Colombo	18 June 1999	Old store room	
National Museum of Colombo		Colombo Municipal boundary		Thimbirigasyaya	18 October 2002		
Nawagamuwa Raja Maha Viahara		Nawagamuwa		Kaduwela	22 November 2002	Old image house, stone pillars, Devalaya, Pattini, Upulvan, Kataragama, Dedimunada Devalayas, Awasa house and courtyard	
Obeysekera Walawwa		Rajagiriya		Kotte	13 November 1992		
Olcott building		Pettah		Colombo	18 June 1999	Theosophical Society center	
Old Colombo Dutch Hospital			Colombo Fort	Colombo	8 July 2005		
Old guard cell			Colombo Fort	Colombo	16 January 1953	At the intersection of Bank of Ceylon Mawatha and the Janadhipathi Mawatha within the Ceylinco Building car park area	
Padanaghara Vihara		Dematagoda		Colombo	18 June 1999	Image house, Awasa house and Devalaya	
Paramadhamma Niwasa Piriwena			No. 533 B Boralesgamuwa	Kesbewa	23 February 2007	Image house and Avasage	
Pita Kotte Gal Ambalama			Pitakotte	Kotte		Ambalama	
Pita Kotte Raja Maha Vihara			Pitakotte (GND No. 522)	Kotte	17 May 2013	Wahalkada (Gateway) and artifacts	
Portland Building		Colombo		Colombo	21 January 2000	Sir Baron Jayatilake Mawatha	
Pushparama Vihara, Ratmalana			No. 546 B Ratmalana Vihara division	Dehiwala	23 February 2007	Image house	
Ratmalana Dewala Watta			Ratmalana West	Ratmalana	23 January 2009	Dewale house and other antiques	
Samadhi Grahaya in Kalandar Sahib Waliyulla Muslim mosque		Maradana town	Panchikawaththa	Colombo	15 April 2016	Rate No. 10, First Lane	
Sankhapitti Vihara		Kotalawala		Kaduwela	1 November 1996	Image house	
Seetalena Cave			No. 432	Hanwella	6 July 2007	Cave with dripledges known as Seethalena situated in the land called Anwilwatta	
Shelk Usman Vali-ulah Darga Mosque alias Davatagaha Mosque		Cinnamon Gardens		Thimbirigasyaya	9 December 2011		
Siri Perakumba Pirivena		Sri Jayawardenepura Kotte		Kotte	14 May 1971		
Sri Shylathalarama Vihara, Madapatha			No. 435-A-Madapatha	Kesbewa	6 June 2008	Buddhist shrine	
Sri Sudharmarama Vihara, Heraliyawala		Heraliyawala		Homagama	22 November 2002	Image house, Awasa house and other ruins	
Sri Sudharmarama Vihara		Bope	No. 459B, Siyambalawa	Padukka	15 April 2016	Shrine within the premises	
St. James Building		No. 393, Union Place	Ibbanwala	Colombo	24 July 2009	The archaic building identified as “St. James”, belonging to the Young Women's Christian Association	
St. Lucia's Cathedral		Kotahena		Colombo	18 June 1999		
Subodharama Purana Vihara		Karagampitiya	Karagampitiya	Dehiwala	23 February 2007	Image house, Sathsathi Mandira, Bana preaching hall, Awasage and relict chamber	
Sunetradevi Raja Maha Vihara		Pepiliyana	No. 535 Pepiliyana west	Kesbewa	23 February 2007	Image house and Avasage	
Jack tree situated in the Hanwella Rest House premises			No. 443 B Hanwella Town	Hanwella	6 February 2009		
Two seats in the Hanwella Rest House			No. 443 B Hanwella Town	Hanwella	6 June 2008		
Two drip ledged rock caves (Binduwanwatte)			No. 440 Neluwanthuduwa	Hanwella	23 January 2009		
Two Storied School for the Blind building			Ratmalana town	Ratmalana	9 September 2011		
Army Recruiting Office building			No. 21 Slave Island	Colombo	6 June 2008	At Malay Street, Colombo 2	
Thilakaratnarama Purana Vihara		Borella town	Borella South	Thimbirigasyaya	8 July 2005	Stupa	
Thummodera rock cave			No. 458 East	Padukka	23 January 2009	The pre historic Thummodera rock cave situated on the Palhorukanda North slope	
Vidyodaya Pirivena, Maligakanda		Maligakanda		Colombo	18 June 1999	Image house and Awasa house	
Vipashyarama Vihara		Watte gedara		Maharagama	8 July 2005	Image house	
Walker Sons and Company Building		Colombo		Colombo	21 January 2000	Sir Baron Jayatilake Mawatha	
