= Wathumulla (Ratmalana) Grama Niladhari Division =

Wathumulla
- Grama Niladhari Division
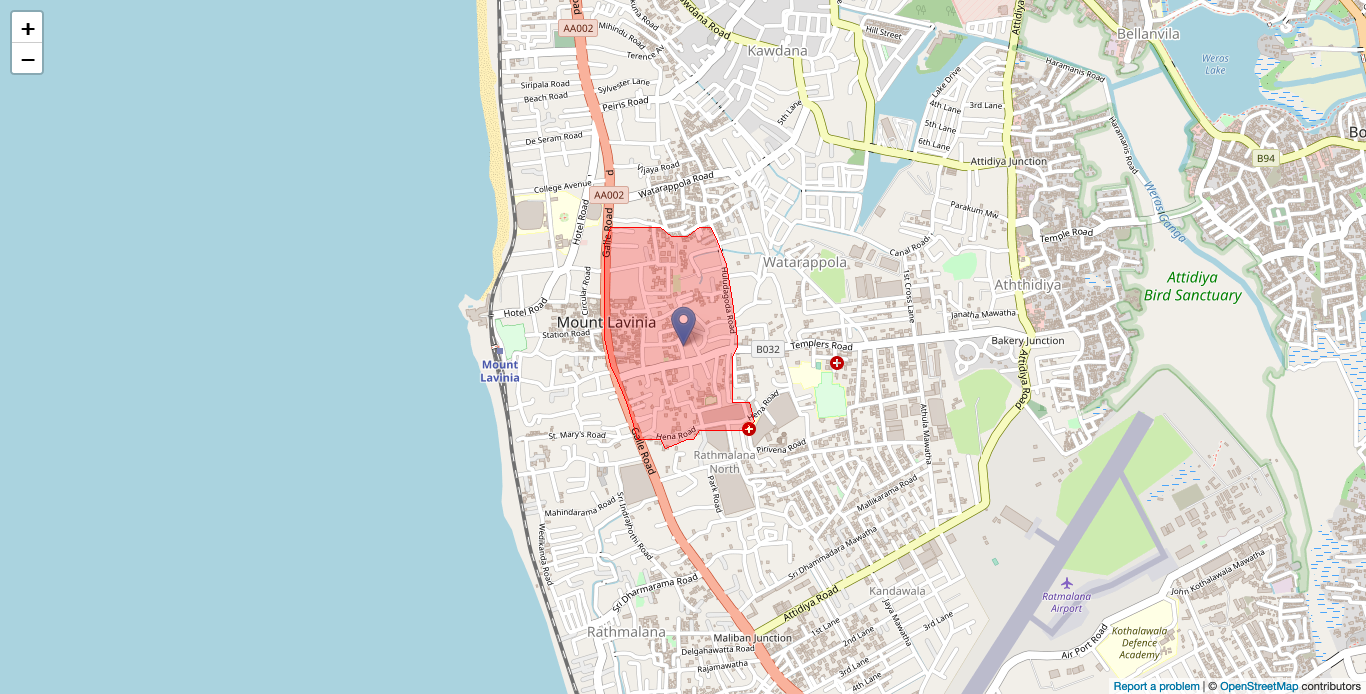
- Wathumulla Grama Niladhari Division
- Coordinates: 6.831871°N 79.870705°E
- Country: Sri Lanka
- Province: Western Province
- District: Colombo District
- Divisional Secretariat: Ratmalana Divisional Secretariat
- Electoral District: Colombo Electoral District
- Polling Division: Ratmalana Polling Division

Area
  - Total: 0.6 km^{2} (0.23 sq mi)
- Elevation: 10 m (33 ft)

Population (2012)
  - Total: 4,608
  - Density: 7,680/km^{2} (19,900/sq mi)
- ISO 3166 code: LK-1131020

Wathumulla Grama Niladhari Division is a Grama Niladhari Division of the Ratmalana Divisional Secretariat of Colombo District of Western Province, Sri Lanka . It has Grama Niladhari Division Code 544A.

Samudrasanna Vihara are located within, nearby or associated with Wathumulla.

Wathumulla is a surrounded by the Watarappala, Katukurunduwatta, Piriwena, Wedikanda and Mount Lavinia Grama Niladhari Divisions.

== Demographics ==
=== Ethnicity ===
The Wathumulla Grama Niladhari Division has a Sinhalese majority (70.6%), a significant Moor population (12.8%) and a significant Sri Lankan Tamil population (12.1%) . In comparison, the Ratmalana Divisional Secretariat (which contains the Wathumulla Grama Niladhari Division) has a Sinhalese majority (78.9%)

Ethnicity in Wathumulla
1. Sinhalese (70.6%)
2. Moor (12.8%)
3. Sri Lankan Tamil (12.1%)
4. Other (1.60%)
5. Indian Tamil (1.50%)
6. Burgher (1.40%)

=== Religion ===
The Wathumulla Grama Niladhari Division has a Buddhist majority (61.2%) and a significant Muslim population (15.2%) . In comparison, the Ratmalana Divisional Secretariat (which contains the Wathumulla Grama Niladhari Division) has a Buddhist majority (70.0%) and a significant Muslim population (11.3%)

Religion in Wathumulla
1. Buddhist (61.2%)
2. Muslim (15.2%)
3. Hindu (9.40%)
4. Other Christian (7.20%)
5. Roman Catholic (6.70%)
6. Other (0.20%)
