= Mount Lavinia Grama Niladhari Division =

Mount Lavinia
- Grama Niladhari Division
- Interactive map of Mount Lavinia
- Coordinates: 6.838750°N 79.863757°E
- Country: Sri Lanka
- Province: Western Province
- District: Colombo District
- Divisional Secretariat: Ratmalana Divisional Secretariat
- Electoral District: Colombo Electoral District
- Polling Division: Ratmalana Polling Division

Area
  - Total: 1.2 km^{2} (0.46 sq mi)
- Elevation: 21 m (69 ft)

Population (2012)
  - Total: 8,373
  - Density: 6,978/km^{2} (18,070/sq mi)
- ISO 3166 code: LK-1131005

Mount Lavinia

Mount Lavinia Grama Niladhari Division is a Grama Niladhari Division of the Ratmalana Divisional Secretariat of Colombo District of Western Province, Sri Lanka. It has Grama Niladhari Division Code 541.

Mount Lavinia is a surrounded by the Watarappala, Karagampitiya, Wathumulla, Jayathilaka, Wedikanda and Kawdana West Grama Niladhari Divisions.

== Demographics ==
=== Ethnicity ===
The Mount Lavinia Grama Niladhari Division has a Sinhalese majority (65.6%), a significant Moor population (16.1%) and a significant Sri Lankan Tamil population (14.7%). In comparison, the Ratmalana Divisional Secretariat (which contains the Mount Lavinia Grama Niladhari Division) has a Sinhalese majority (78.9%)

Ethnicity in Mount Lavinia
1. Sinhalese (65.6%)
2. Moor (16.1%)
3. Sri Lankan Tamil (14.7%)
4. Other (1.20%)
5. Indian Tamil (1.20%)
6. Burgher (1.10%)

=== Religion ===
The Mount Lavinia Grama Niladhari Division has a Buddhist majority (56.0%), a significant Muslim population (16.9%) and a significant Hindu population (10.8%). In comparison, the Ratmalana Divisional Secretariat (which contains the Mount Lavinia Grama Niladhari Division) has a Buddhist majority (70.0%) and a significant Muslim population (11.3%)

Religion in Mount Lavinia
1. Buddhist (56.0%)
2. Muslim (16.9%)
3. Hindu (10.8%)
4. Other Christian (9.60%)
5. Roman Catholic (6.40%)
6. Other (0.30%)
