= Attidiya South Grama Niladhari Division =

Attidiya South
- Grama Niladhari Division
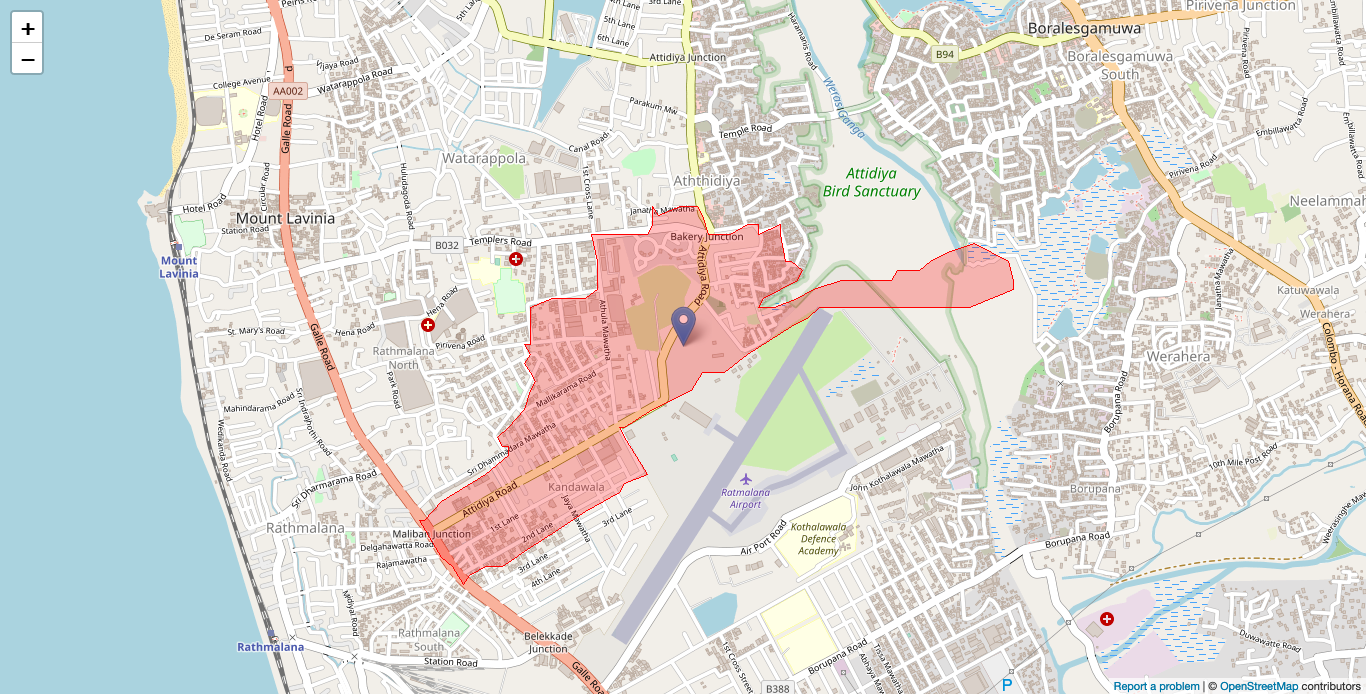
- Attidiya South Grama Niladhari Division
- Interactive map of Attidiya South
- Coordinates: 6.827453°N 79.884460°E
- Country: Sri Lanka
- Province: Western Province
- District: Colombo District
- Divisional Secretariat: Ratmalana Divisional Secretariat
- Electoral District: Colombo Electoral District
- Polling Division: Ratmalana Polling Division

Area
  - Total: 1.57 km^{2} (0.61 sq mi)
- Elevation: 11 m (36 ft)

Population (2012)
  - Total: 7,683
  - Density: 4,894/km^{2} (12,680/sq mi)
- ISO 3166 code: LK-1131035

Attidiya South Grama Niladhari Division is a Grama Niladhari Division of the Ratmalana Divisional Secretariat of Colombo District of Western Province, Sri Lanka . It has Grama Niladhari Division Code 543B.

Ratmalana Airport and Ratmalana are located within, nearby or associated with Attidiya South.

Attidiya South is a surrounded by the Vihara, Ratmalana East, Boralesgamuwa West B, Werahera North, Kandawala, Attidiya North, Piriwena and Katukurunduwatta Grama Niladhari Divisions.

== Demographics ==
=== Ethnicity ===
The Attidiya South Grama Niladhari Division has a Sinhalese majority (90.9%) . In comparison, the Ratmalana Divisional Secretariat (which contains the Attidiya South Grama Niladhari Division) has a Sinhalese majority (78.9%).

Ethnicity in Attidiya South
1. Sinhalese (90.9%)
2. Moor (3.80%)
3. Sri Lankan Tamil (3.40%)
4. Burgher (1.10%)
5. Other (0.70%)

=== Religion ===
The Attidiya South Grama Niladhari Division has a Buddhist majority (82.1%) . In comparison, the Ratmalana Divisional Secretariat (which contains the Attidiya South Grama Niladhari Division) has a Buddhist majority (70.0%) and a significant Muslim population (11.3%)

Religion in Attidiya South
1. Buddhist (82.1%)
2. Roman Catholic (6.70%)
3. Muslim (4.70%)
4. Other Christian (4.00%)
5. Hindu (2.40%)
6. Other (0.00%)

== Gallery ==
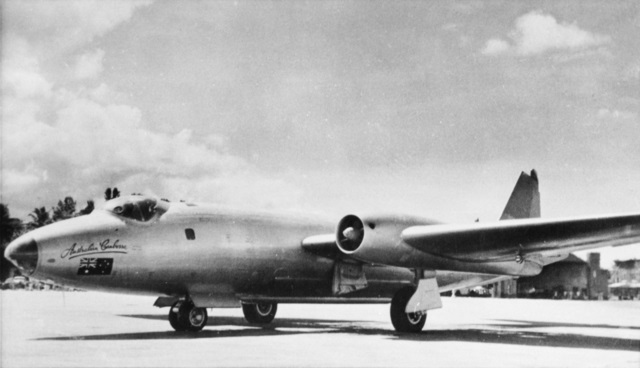
Ratmalana Airport
