= R. Premadasa Stadium =

Cricket stadium in Sri Lanka

R. Premadasa Cricket Stadium
- Khettarama Stadium
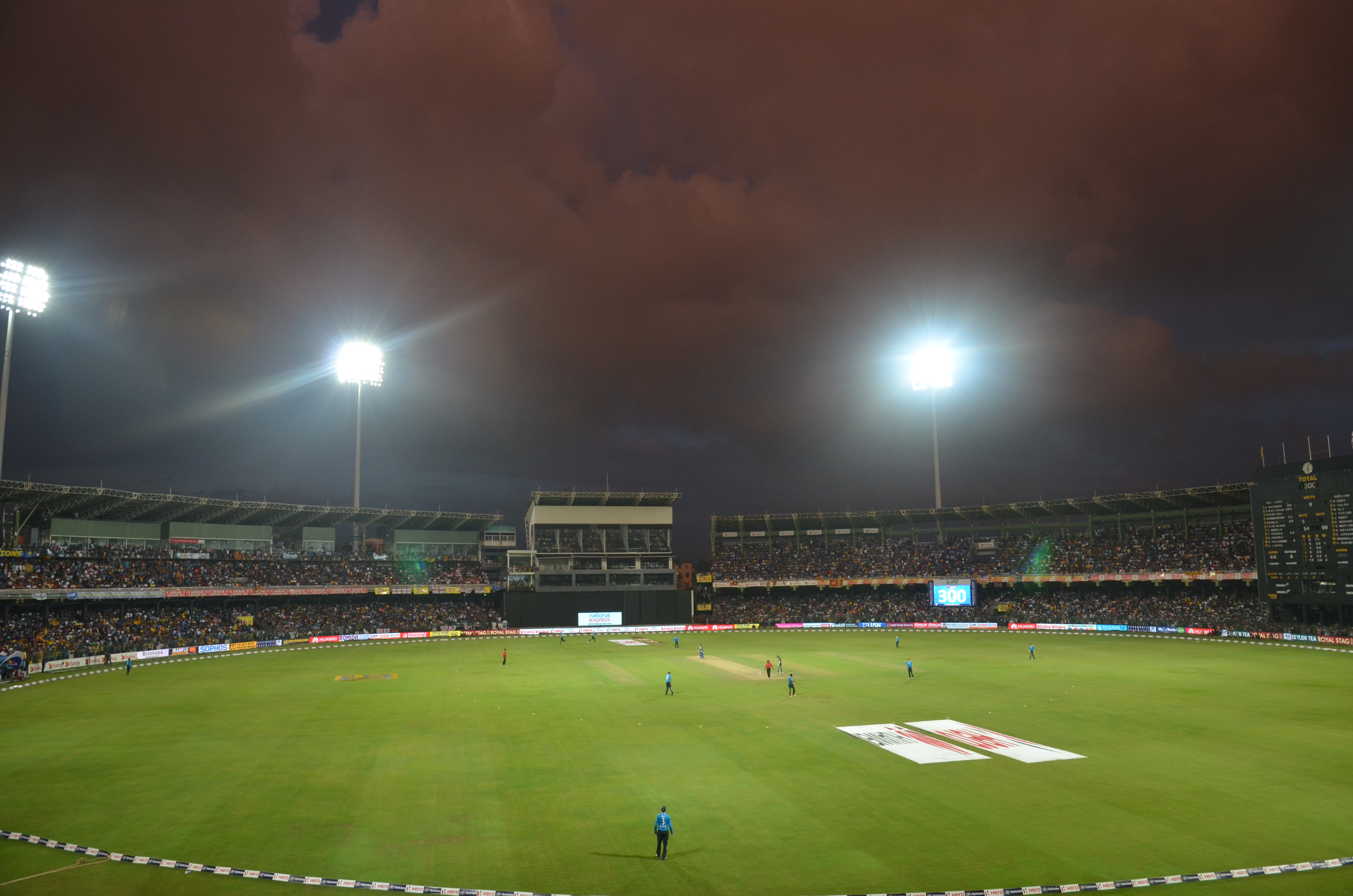
- The stadium during an ODI match between Sri Lanka and England in 2014.
- Interactive map of R. Premadasa Cricket Stadium

Ground information
- Location: Colombo
- Country: Sri Lanka
- Coordinates: 6°56′23″N 79°52′19″E
- Establishment: 1986
- Capacity: 35,000
- Owner: Sri Lanka Cricket
- Operator: Sri Lanka Cricket
- End names
- Khettarama End; Maligawatte End

International information
- First men's Test: 28 August – 2 September 1992: Sri Lanka v Australia
- Last men's Test: 14–18 July 2017: Sri Lanka v Zimbabwe
- First men's ODI: 5 April 1986: Sri Lanka v New Zealand
- Last men's ODI: 27 January 2026: Sri Lanka v England
- First men's T20I: 10 February 2009: Sri Lanka v India
- Last men's T20I: 11 February 2026: Australia v Ireland
- First women's ODI: 29 March 1999: Sri Lanka v Netherlands
- Last women's ODI: 11 May 2025: Sri Lanka v India
- First women's T20I: 4 October 2012: England v New Zealand
- Last women's T20I: 26 May 2015: Sri Lanka v West Indies

Team information
Sri Lanka national cricket team	(1986–present)
- As of 8 February 2026; Source: Cricinfo; CricketArchive

The R. Premadasa Cricket Stadium (RPS) (Sinhala: ආර්. ප්‍රේමදාස ක්‍රීඩාංගනය, Tamil: ஆர். பிரேமதாச அரங்கம்; formerly known as Khettarama Stadium) is a cricket stadium on Khettarama Road, in the Maligawatta suburb of Colombo, Sri Lanka. The stadium was, before June 1994, known as the Khettarama Cricket Stadium and is today one of the main venues where the Sri Lankan cricket team play, having hosted more than 150 one-day international matches. It is the largest stadium in Sri Lanka with a capacity of 35,000 spectators. It has hosted the 2012 ICC World Twenty20 final between Sri Lanka and West Indies; the 2002 ICC Champions Trophy final between Sri Lanka and India and first semi-final of the 2011 ICC Cricket World Cup between Sri Lanka and New Zealand. This was where the highest Test score in history was recorded; 952 by Sri Lanka against India. With capacity exceeding Lord's in England, the stadium is known as the "Home of Sri Lankan Cricket".

== History ==
=== Renovation ===
The Premadasa Stadium underwent a reconstruction project in preparation for the 2011 Cricket World Cup. The stadium has been undergoing large-scale renovations since 2009. It has had its seating capacity increase from 14,000 to 40,000, the media box accommodating 200 journalists, and other upgrades. The renovations have cost Sri Lanka Cricket $8 million.

In July 2010, a report filed by the ICC pitch consultant, Andy Atkinson, raised concerns over the condition of the outfield and the pitch claiming he was worried at the slow pace of progress. Although none of the buildings at the stadium was near completion, the 2nd Test of the West Indies tour of Sri Lanka in 2010, was held at the venue in 23–27 November. Sri Lanka Cricket defended choosing the stadium saying that the decision to stage a game was to allow cricketers to acclimatize themselves to the ground ahead of the World Cup games. The Test match was staged using temporary seating for spectators in a corner of the stadium as only players' pavilions had permanent arrangements. Since the press box was not completed reporters and commentators facing technical difficulties used a makeshift arrangement.

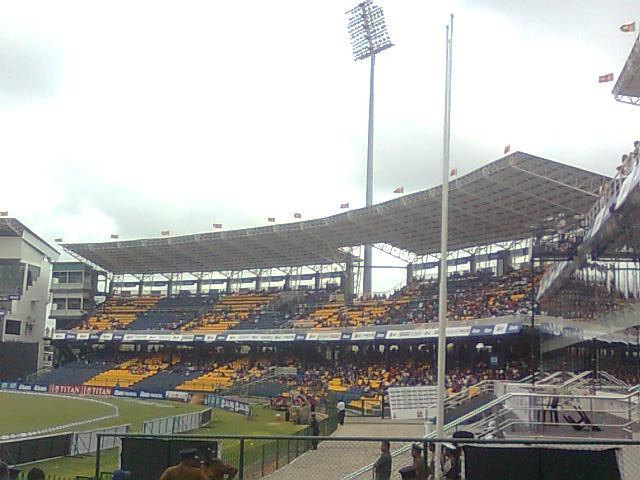
Renovated Pavilion B

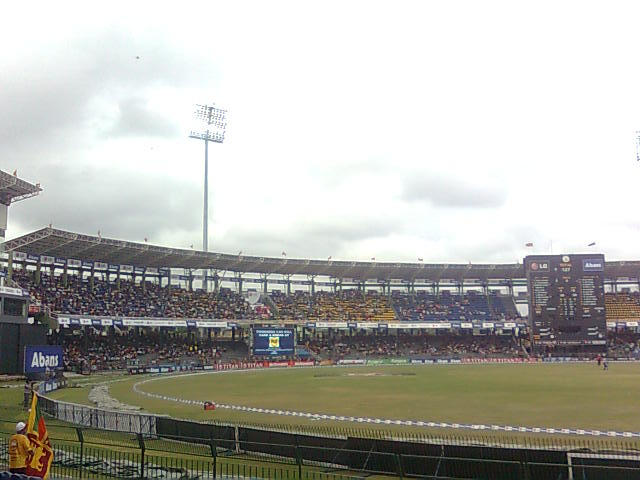

The main four public stands were refurbished along with the player dressing room area and the corporate boxes. A VIP car park is at the northern end of the ground.

=== Stadium plan ===
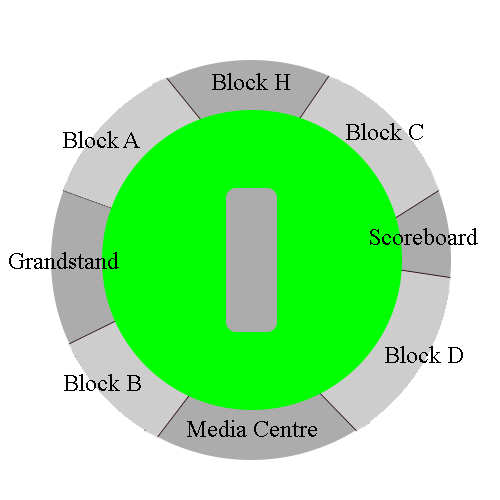
Current stands at R. Premadasa.

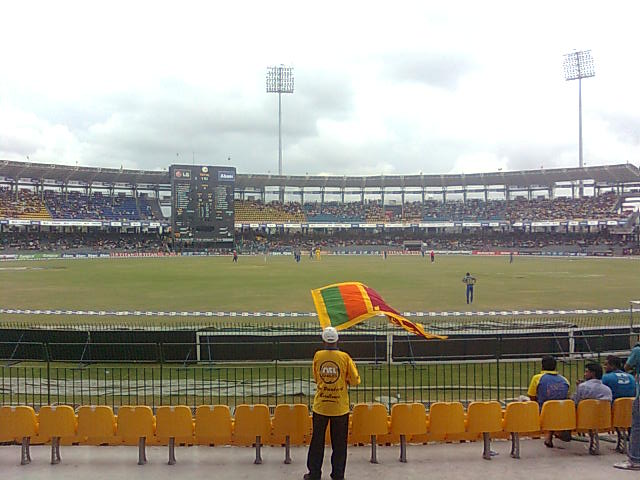

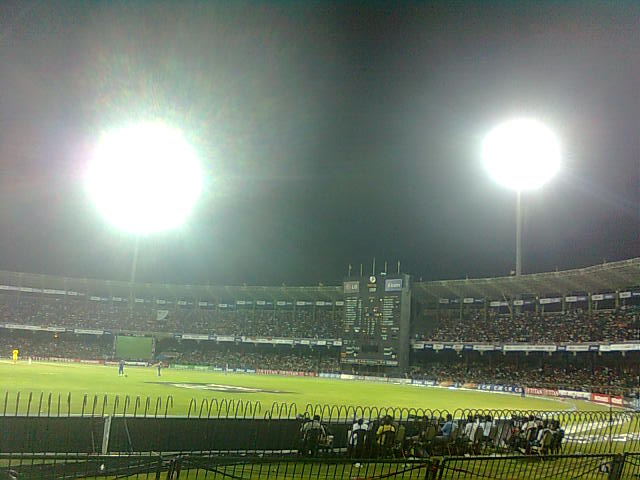

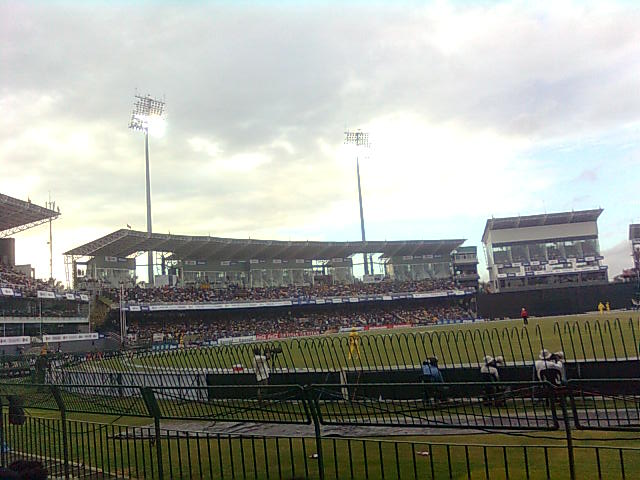

Pavilions A and B are fully equipped with seating in two tiers, lower and higher. Several corporate boxes are built in these two stands. Pavilions C and D are built between the scoreboard in the stadium with a two-tiered seating system. The lower tiers have concrete paving allocated for floor seating and the upper tier includes fully standard seating blocks. The grandstand and top-level block above the player pavilions have enhanced quality seating. Pavilions A and B give a moderate view of the scoreboard while the grandstand not only gives a good view of the scoreboard but also the game and pitch.

=== After renovation ===
The R Premadasa Stadium hosted seven successful World Cup matches including a quarter-final and a semi-final. On 10 May 2011 Sri Lanka Cricket secretary Nishantha Ranatunga confirmed that the first edition of 2011 Sri Lanka Premier League's matches would play at R Premadasa Stadium. The tournament was later postponed till 2012 due to financial complications and internal regime change at Sri Lanka Cricket.

On 21 September 2011, it was announced that the stadium would host fifteen 2012 ICC World Twenty20 matches, including the semi-finals and the final.

=== Asia Cup 2023 ===
The Premdasa Stadium was chosen as one of the four venues to host the matches of the 2023 Asia Cup, which Sri Lanka were co-hosting along with Pakistan. The stadium hosted 5 out of the 6 Super Four matches, while also hosting the tournament final.

=== T20 World Cup 2026 ===
The R. Premdasa stadium is the planned venue for eight matches during the ICC Men's 2026 World Cup to be held in February 2026 (co-hosted by India & Sri Lanka). A total of eight matches will be held at the venue: five during the initial group stage (Groups A and B), including the India-Pakistan rivalry on Feb 15, and three contests during the Super 8. It may host the final as well, in case Pakistan qualifies for the Final.

== Ground figures ==
=== Key ===
- P Matches Played
- H Matches Won by Home Side
- T Matches Won by Touring Side
- N Matches Won by Neutral Side
- D/N/T Matches Drawn/No Result/Tied

Ground Figures
Format	P	H	T	N	D/N/T	Inaugural Match	Latest Match
Test matches	9	4	1	0	4	28 August 1992	14 July 2017
One-Day Internationals	159	86	43	20	10	4 April 1986	24 January 2026
Twenty20 Internationals	44	6	22	15	1	10 February 2009	8 June 2022
Last updated:11 September 2023

=== Test cricket ===
- The highest Test total of all time was recorded at the R Premadasa Stadium is 952/6 declared by Sri Lanka against India in 1997.
- The lowest Test total is 87 by Bangladesh against Sri Lanka in 2005.
- Sanath Jayasuriya scored 340 against India in 1997. This remains the highest score at R Premadasa Stadium.
- The 36 wickets captured by Muttiah Muralitharan remains the most number of wickets at the R Premadasa stadium.
- The best bowling figures in an innings is 7/89 by Rangana Herath against Bangladesh in the 2012/13 season.
- Muttiah Muralitharan's 9/60 remains the best bowling figures in a match.

=== One Day Internationals ===
- The highest ODI total is 375/5 by India against Sri Lanka on 31 August 2017.
- Sanath Jayasuriya has scored 2514 runs which is the highest by a single player at the Premadasa stadium and he held the record for being the highest runs scored in a single cricket ground till January 2018 when Tamim Iqbal overtook it. Marvan Atapattu, Aravinda de Silva, Mahela Jayawardene, Kumar Sangakkara and Sachin Tendulkar have scored more than 1000 runs.
- Muttiah Muralitharan with 75 scalps has captured the most number of wickets at the Premadasa stadium.
- The highest individual score at R Premadasa stadium is 169 by Kumar Sangakkara against South Africa in the 2013 season.
- R Premedasa stadium became the first in Sri Lanka and fourth in the world to host 100 ODIs.
- Lasith Malinga has taken two ODI hat-tricks at this stadium. The first came against Kenya in the 2011 World Cup and the second versus Australia on 22 August 2011

=== Twenty20 Internationals ===
- The first match played on 10 February 2009 involved Sri Lanka and India.
- Highest team total at the R. Premadasa Stadium is 215/5 by Bangladesh against Sri Lanka.
- The lowest total is 80 by Afghanistan against England on 21 September 2012.
- Sri Lanka has lost 9 of 10 matches played on this ground, which is the worst home ground for Sri Lanka.
- Sri Lanka won the T20I series against India for the first time at this ground in 2021.

=== Longest over ===
The longest over at this stadium was bowled by James Grant in 2001.

== World Cup Cricket ==
In 1996 and 2011 ICC cricket world cups R. Premadasa Stadium hosted nine matches including a quarter-final match and a semi-final match. It has hosted the highest number of cricket World Cup matches in Sri Lanka.

=== 1996 Cricket World Cup ===
17 February 1996
scorecard

Sri Lanka	v	Australia

Sri Lanka won on a forfeit
R. Premadasa Stadium, Colombo
Umpires: Mahboob Shah and Cyril Mitchley

- Australia forfeited the match due to safety concerns and was in Mumbai at the time of the match.

26 February 1996
scorecard

Sri Lanka	v	West Indies

Sri Lanka won on forfeit
R. Premadasa Stadium, Colombo
Umpires: Mahboob Shah and V.K. Ramaswamy

- West Indies forfeited the match due to safety concerns.

=== 2011 Cricket World Cup ===
Group matches

26 February 2011 (D/N)
Scorecard

Pakistan; 277/7 (50 overs)	v	Sri Lanka; 266/9 (50 overs)
Misbah-ul-Haq 83* (91); Rangana Herath 2/46 (10 overs)		Chamara Silva 57 (78); Shahid Afridi 4/34 (10 overs)

Pakistan won by 11 runs.
R. Premadasa Stadium, Colombo
Umpires: Ian Gould and Daryl Harper
Player of the match: Shahid Afridi (Pak)

- Pakistan won the toss and elected to bat first.

1 March 2011 (D/N)
Scorecard

Kenya; 142 (43.4 overs)	v	Sri Lanka; 146/1 (18.4 overs)
Collins Obuya 52 (100); Lasith Malinga 6/38 (7.4 overs)		Upul Tharanga 67 (59); Elijah Otieno 1/26 (4 overs)

Sri Lanka won by 9 wickets (with 188 balls remaining)
R. Premadasa Stadium, Colombo
Umpires: Tony Hill and Shavir Tarapore
Player of the match: Lasith Malinga (Sri)

- Kenya won the toss and elected to bat first.
- Lasith Malinga took his second ODI hat-trick.

3 March 2011 (D/N)
Scorecard

Pakistan; 184 (43 overs)	v	Canada; 138 (42.5 overs)
Umar Akmal 48 (68); Harvir Baidwan 3/35 (8 overs)		Jimmy Hansra 43 (75); Shahid Afridi 5/23 (10 overs)

Pakistan won by 46 runs
R. Premadasa Stadium, Colombo
Umpires: Daryl Harper and Nigel Llong
Player of the match: Shahid Afridi (Pak)

- Pakistan won the toss and elected to bat first.

5 March 2011 (D/N)
Scorecard

Sri Lanka; 146/3 (32.5 overs)	v	Australia
Kumar Sangakkara 73* (102); Shaun Tait 1/23 (5 overs)

Match abandoned due to rain
R. Premadasa Stadium, Colombo
Umpires: Ian Gould and Tony Hill
Player of the match: DNA

- Sri Lanka won the toss and elected to bat first.
- Due to rain, match abandoned; therefore Sri Lanka and Australia got 1-point each.

19 March 2011 (D/N)
Scorecard

Australia; 176 (46.4 overs)	v	Pakistan; 178/6 (41 overs)
Brad Haddin 42 (80); Umar Gul 3/30 (7.4 overs)		Asad Shafiq 46 (81); Bret Lee 4/28 (8 overs)

Pakistan won by 4 wickets (with 54 balls remaining)
R. Premadasa Stadium, Colombo
Umpires: Marais Erasmus and Tony Hill
Player of the match: Umar Akmal (Pak)

- Australia won the toss and elected to bat first.

Quarter-finals

26 March 2011 (D/N)
Scorecard

England; 229/6 (50 overs)	v	Sri Lanka; 231/0 (39.3 overs)
Jonathan Trott 86 (115); Muttiah Muralitharan 2/54 (9 overs)		Tillakaratne Dilshan 108* (115); Luke Wright 0/17 (4 overs)

Sri Lanka won by 10 wickets (with 63 balls remaining)
R. Premadasa Stadium, Colombo
Umpires: Simon Taufel and Billy Doctrove
Player of the match: Tillakaratne Dilshan (Sri)

- England won the toss and elected to bat first.
- For the first time England lost a World Cup match by 10 wickets.

Semi-finals

29 March 2011 (D/N)
Scorecard

New Zealand; 217 (48.5 overs)	v	Sri Lanka; 220/5 (47.5 overs)
Scott Styris 57 (77); Ajantha Mendis 3/35 (9.5 overs)		Tillakaratne Dilshan 73 (93); Tim Southee 3/57 (10 overs)

Sri Lanka won by 5 wickets (with 13 balls remaining)
R. Premadasa Stadium, Colombo, Sri Lanka
Umpires: Aleem Dar and Steve Davis
Player of the match: Kumar Sangakkara (Sri)

- New Zealand won the toss and elected to bat first.
- This is New Zealand's sixth World Cup semi-final and Sri Lanka's fourth.

== ICC Champions Trophy Cricket ==
The 2002 ICC Champions Trophy was held in Sri Lanka. Nine matches were played in R. Premadasa Stadium including the semi-finals and the final. Other matches were played in SSC.

=== 2002 ICC Champions Trophy ===
Group matches

12 September 2002 (D/N)
Scorecard

Pakistan; 200 (49.4 overs)	v	Sri Lanka; 201/2 (36.1 overs)
Saeed Anwar 52 (82); Muttiah Muralitharan 3/29 (10 overs)		Sanath Jayasuriya 102* (120); Wasim Akram 1/42 (8 overs)

Sri Lanka won by 8 wickets
R. Premadasa Stadium, Colombo, Sri Lanka
Umpires: Steve Bucknor and Daryl Harper
Player of the match: Sanath Jayasuriya (Sri)

- Pakistan won the toss and elected to bat first.

14 September 2002 (D/N)
Scorecard

India; 288/6 (50 overs)	v	Zimbabwe; 274/8 (50 overs)
Mohammad Kaif 111 (112); Douglas Hondo 4/62 (9 overs)		Andy Flower 145 (164); Zaheer Khan 4/45 (10 overs)

India won by 14 runs
R. Premadasa Stadium, Colombo, Sri Lanka
Umpires: Asoka de Silva and Rudi Koertzen
Player of the match: Mohammad Kaif (Ind)

- India won the toss and elected to bat first.

16 September 2002 (D/N)
Scorecard

Sri Lanka; 292/6 (50 overs)	v	Netherlands; 86 (29.3 overs)
Marvan Atapattu 101 (118); Adeel Raja 2/50 (10 overs)		Tim de Leede 31 (43); Muttiah Muralitharan 4/15 (5.3 overs)

Sri Lanka won by 206 runs
R. Premadasa Stadium, Colombo, Sri Lanka
Umpires: Dave Orchard and David Shepherd
Player of the match: Marvan Atapattu (Sri)

- Sri Lanka won the toss and elected to bat first.

18 September 2002 (D/N)
Scorecard

England; 298/8 (50 overs)	v	Zimbabwe; 190/9 (48 overs)
Marcus Trescothick 119 (102); Douglas Hondo 4/45 (6 overs)		Heath Streak 50* (58); Ronnie Irani 4/37 (10 overs)

England won by 108 runs
R. Premadasa Stadium, Colombo, Sri Lanka
Umpires: Steve Bucknor and Rudi Koertzen
Player of the match: Marcus Trescothick (Eng)

- England won the toss and elected to bat first.
  Zimbabwe were fined 2 overs for a slow over rate.

20 September 2002 (D/N)
Scorecard

South Africa; 316/5 (50 overs)	v	Kenya; 140 (46.5 overs)
Herschelle Gibbs 116 (126); Collins Obuya 2/77 (10 overs)		Steve Tikolo 69 (97); Dale Benkenstein 3/5 (3.5 overs)

South Africa won by 176 runs
R. Premadasa Stadium, Colombo, Sri Lanka
Umpires: Daryl Harper and Srinivasaraghavan Venkataraghavan
Player of the match: Herschelle Gibbs (RSA)

- South Africa won the toss and elected to bat first.

22 September 2002 (D/N)
Scorecard

England; 269/7 (50 overs)	v	India; 271/2 (39.3 overs)
Ian Blackwell 82 (68); Ashish Nehra 2/49 (10 overs)		Virender Sehwag 126 (124); Ian Blackwell 1/46 (8 overs)

India won by 8 wickets
R. Premadasa Stadium, Colombo, Sri Lanka
Umpires: Steve Bucknor and Russell Tiffin
Player of the match: Virender Sehwag (Ind)

- England won the toss and elected to bat first.

Semi-finals

25 September 2002 (D/N)
Scorecard

India; 261/9 (50 overs)	v	South Africa; 251/6 (50 overs)
Yuvraj Singh 62 (72); Shaun Pollock 3/43 (9 overs)		Herschelle Gibbs 116 (119); Virender Sehwag 3/25 (5 overs)

India won by 10 runs
R. Premadasa Stadium, Colombo, Sri Lanka
Umpires: David Shepherd and Russell Tiffin
Player of the match: Virender Sehwag (Ind)

- India won the toss and elected to bat first.
- India advanced to the final.

27 September 2002 (D/N)
Scorecard

Australia; 162 (48.4 overs)	v	Sri Lanka; 163/3 (40 overs)
Shane Warne 36 (69); Muttiah Muralitharan 3/26 (9.4 overs)		Marvan Atapattu 51 (113); Glenn McGrath 2/41 (10 overs)

Sri Lanka won by 7 wickets
R. Premadasa Stadium, Colombo, Sri Lanka
Umpires: Steve Bucknor and Dave Orchard
Player of the match: Aravinda de Silva (Sri)

- Australia won the toss and elected to bat first.
- Sri Lanka advanced to the final.

Final

30 September 2002 (D/N)
Scorecard

Sri Lanka; 222/7 (50 overs)	v	India; 38/1 (8.4 overs)
Mahela Jayawardene 77 (99); Zaheer Khan 3/44 (9 overs)		Virender Sehwag 25* (22); Chaminda Vass 1/24 (4.4 overs)

No result
R. Premadasa Stadium, Colombo, Sri Lanka
Umpires: Steve Bucknor and David Shepherd

- Match rained out twice.
- India and Sri Lanka declared co-champions

== ICC World Twenty20 ==
Sri Lanka hosted the 2012 ICC World Twenty20. Fifteen out of twenty-seven matches were played at R. Premadasa Stadium, including the semi-finals and the final. Other matches were played in Pallekele International Cricket Stadium and Mahinda Rajapaksa International Stadium.

=== 2012 ICC World Twenty20 ===
Group matches

19 September 2012
15:30 (D/N)
Scorecard

Ireland; 123/7 (20 overs)	v	Australia; 125/3 (15.1 overs)
Kevin O'Brien 35 (29); Shane Watson 3/26 (4 overs)		Shane Watson 51 (30); Kevin O'Brien 1/18 (3 overs)

Australia won by 7 wickets
R. Premadasa Stadium, Colombo, Sri Lanka
Umpires: Aleem Dar (Pak) and Kumar Dharmasena (SL)
Player of the match: Shane Watson (Aus)

- Ireland won the toss and elected to bat

19 September 2012
19:30 (D/N)
Scorecard

India; 159/5 (20 overs)	v	Afghanistan; 136 (19.3 overs)
Virat Kohli 50 (39); Shapoor Zadran 2/33 (4 overs)		Mohammad Nabi 31 (17); Lakshmipathy Balaji 3/19 (3.3 overs)

India won by 23 runs
R. Premadasa Stadium, Colombo, Sri Lanka
Umpires: Asad Rauf (Pak) and Simon Taufel (Aus)
Player of the match: Virat Kohli (Ind)

- Afghanistan won the toss and elected to field

21 September 2012
19:30 (D/N)
Scorecard

England; 196/5 (20 overs)	v	Afghanistan; 80 (17.2 overs)
Luke Wright 99* (55); Izatullah Dawlatzai 2/56 (3 overs)		Gulbodin Naib 44 (32); Samit Patel 2/6 (3 overs)

England won by 116 runs
R. Premadasa Stadium, Colombo, Sri Lanka
Umpires: Kumar Dharmasena (SL) and Simon Taufel (Aus)
Player of the match: Luke Wright (Eng)

- Afghanistan won the toss and elected to field

22 September 2012
19:30 (D/N)
Scorecard

West Indies; 191/8 (20 overs)	v	Australia; 100/1 (9.1 overs)
Chris Gayle 54 (33); Mitchell Starc 3/35 (4 overs)		Shane Watson 41* (24); Fidel Edwards 1/16 (2 overs)

Australia won by 17 runs (D/L method)
R. Premadasa Stadium, Colombo, Sri Lanka
Umpires: Aleem Dar (Pak) and Asad Rauf (Pak)
Player of the match: Shane Watson (Aus)

- West Indies won the toss and elected to bat

23 September 2012
19:30 (D/N)
Scorecard

India; 170/4 (20 overs)	v	England; 80 (14.4 overs)
Rohit Sharma 55* (33); Steven Finn 2/33 (4 overs)		Craig Kieswetter 35 (25); Harbhajan Singh 4/12 (4 overs)

India won by 90 runs
R. Premadasa Stadium, Colombo, Sri Lanka
Umpires: Aleem Dar (Pak) and Asad Rauf (Pak)
Player of the match: Harbhajan Singh (Ind)

- England won the toss and elected to field

24 September 2012
19:30 (D/N)
Scorecard

Ireland; 129/6 (19 overs)	v	West Indies
Niall O'Brien 25 (21); Chris Gayle 2/21 (3 overs)

No result
R. Premadasa Stadium, Colombo, Sri Lanka
Umpires: Asad Rauf (Pak) and Kumar Dharmasena (SL)

- West Indies won the toss and elected to field

Super 8s

28 September 2012
15:30 (D/N)
Scorecard

South Africa; 133/6 (20 overs)	v	Pakistan; 136/8 (19.4 overs)
JP Duminy 48 (38); Mohammad Hafeez 2/23 (4 overs)		Umar Akmal 43* (41); Dale Steyn 3/22 (4 overs)

Pakistan won by 2 wickets
R. Premadasa Stadium, Colombo, Sri Lanka
Umpires: Ian Gould (Eng) and Rod Tucker (Aus)
Player of the match: Umar Gul (Pak)

- South Africa won the toss and elected to bat

28 September 2012
19:30 (D/N)
Scorecard

India; 140/7 (20 overs)	v	Australia; 141/1 (14.5 overs)
Irfan Pathan 31 (30); Shane Watson 3/34 (4 overs)		Shane Watson 72 (42); Yuvraj Singh 1/16 (2 overs)

Australia won by 9 wickets
R. Premadasa Stadium, Colombo, Sri Lanka
Umpires: Kumar Dharmasena (Sri) and Richard Kettleborough (Eng)
Player of the match: Shane Watson (Aus)

- India won the toss and elected to bat

30 September 2012
15:30 (D/N)
Scorecard

South Africa; 146/5 (20 overs)	v	Australia; 147/2 (17.4 overs)
Robin Peterson 32* (19); Xavier Doherty 3/20 (4 overs)		Shane Watson 70 (47); Morne Morkel 1/23 (3 overs)

Australia won by 8 wickets
R. Premadasa Stadium, Colombo, Sri Lanka
Umpires: Kumar Dharmasena (Sri Lanka) and Ian Gould (Eng)
Player of the match: Shane Watson (Aus)

- Australia won the toss and elected to field

30 September 2012
19:30 (D/N)
Scorecard

Pakistan; 128 (19.4 overs)	v	India; 129/2 (17 overs)
Shoaib Malik 28 (22); Lakshmipathy Balaji 3/22 (3.4 overs)		Virat Kohli 78* (61); Raza Hasan 1/22 (4 overs)

India won by 8 wickets
R. Premadasa Stadium, Colombo, Sri Lanka
Umpires: Richard Kettleborough (Eng) and Rod Tucker (Aus)
Player of the match: Virat Kohli (Ind)

- Pakistan won the toss and elected to bat

2 October 2012
15:30 (D/N)
Scorecard

Pakistan; 149/6 (20 overs)	v	Australia; 117/7 (20 overs)
Nasir Jamshed 55 (46); Mitchell Starc 3/20 (4 overs)		Michael Hussey 54* (47); Saeed Ajmal 3/17 (4 overs)

Pakistan won by 32 runs
R. Premadasa Stadium, Colombo, Sri Lanka
Umpires: Ian Gould (Eng) and Richard Kettleborough (Eng)
Player of the match: Raza Hasan (Pak)

- Australia won the toss and elected to field

2 October 2012
19:30 (D/N)
Scorecard

India; 152/6 (20 overs)	v	South Africa; 151 (19.5 overs)
Suresh Raina 45 (34); Robin Peterson 2/25 (4 overs)		Francois du Plessis 65 (38); Zaheer Khan 3/22 (4 overs)

India won by 1 run
R. Premadasa Stadium, Colombo, Sri Lanka
Umpires: Kumar Dharmasena (Sri) and Rod Tucker (Aus)
Player of the match: Yuvraj Singh (Ind)

- South Africa won the toss and elected to field

Semi-finals

4 October 2012
19:00 (D/N)
Scorecard

Sri Lanka; 139/4 (20 overs)	v	Pakistan; 123/7 (20 overs)
Mahela Jayawardene 42 (36); Mohammad Hafeez 1/12 (2 overs)		Mohammad Hafeez 42 (40); Rangana Herath 3/25 (4 overs)

Sri Lanka won by 16 runs
R. Premadasa Stadium, Colombo, Sri Lanka
Umpires: Simon Taufel (Aus) and Rod Tucker (Aus)
Player of the match: Mahela Jayawardene (SL)

- Sri Lanka won the toss and elected to bat

5 October 2012
19:00 (D/N)
Scorecard

West Indies; 205/4 (20 overs)	v	Australia; 131 (16.4 overs)
Chris Gayle 75* (41); Pat Cummins 2/36 (4 overs)		George Bailey 63 (29); Ravi Rampaul 3/16 (3.4 overs)

West Indies won by 74 runs
R. Premadasa Stadium, Colombo, Sri Lanka
Umpires: Aleem Dar (Pak) and Kumar Dharmasena (Sri)
Player of the match: Chris Gayle (WI)

- West Indies won the toss and elected to bat

Final

7 October 2012
19:00 (D/N)
Scorecard

West Indies; 137/6 (20 overs)	v	Sri Lanka; 101 (18.4 overs)
Marlon Samuels 78 (55); Ajantha Mendis 4/12 (4 overs)		Mahela Jayawardene 33 (36); Sunil Narine 3/9 (3.4 overs)

West Indies won by 36 runs
R. Premadasa Stadium, Colombo, Sri Lanka
Umpires: Aleem Dar (Pak) and Simon Taufel (Aus)
Player of the match: Marlon Samuels (West Indies)

- West Indies won the toss and elected to bat

== Gallery ==
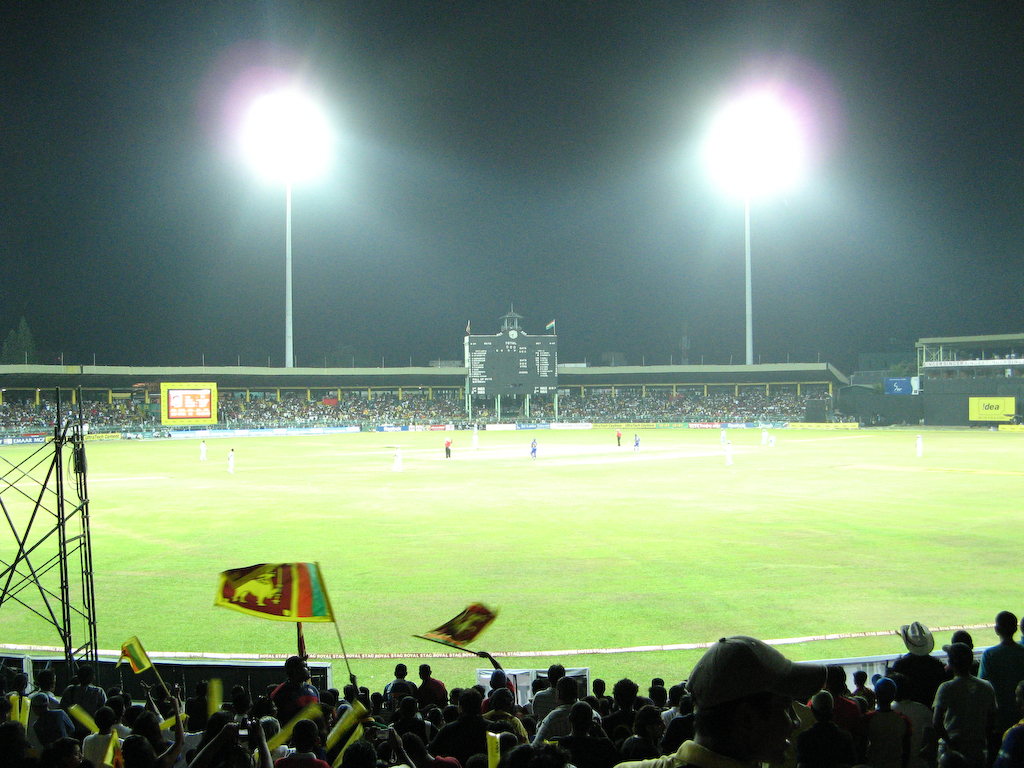
At night, with the lights on (before redevelopment)

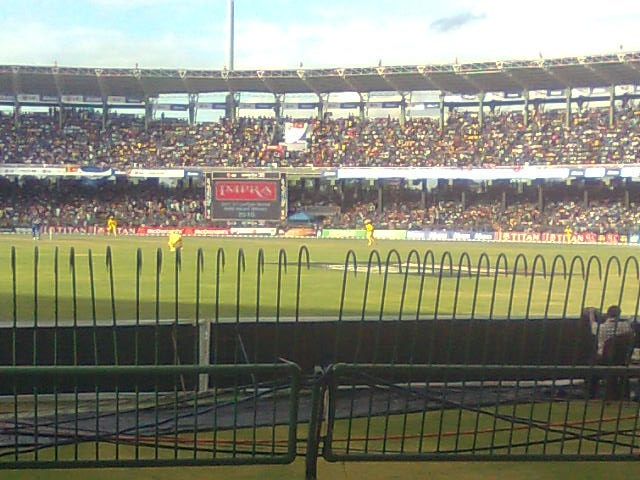
Pavilion C and D, August 2011

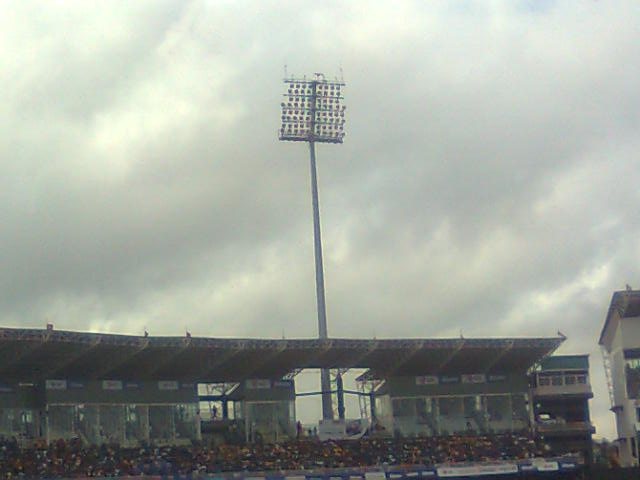
Floodlights at the RPS, Colombo

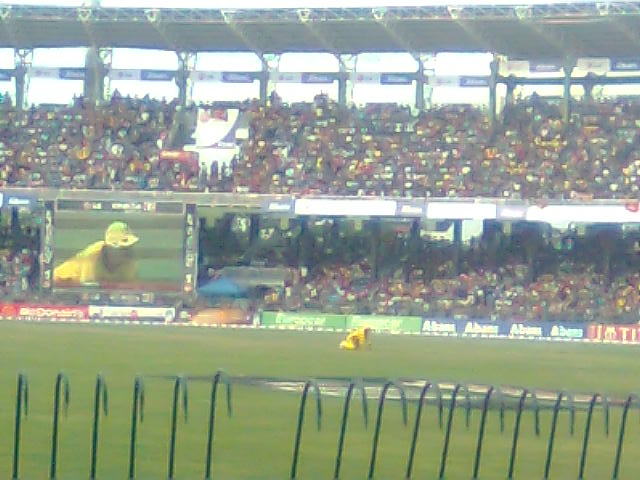
Australia took on Sri Lanka in two ODIs, August 2011

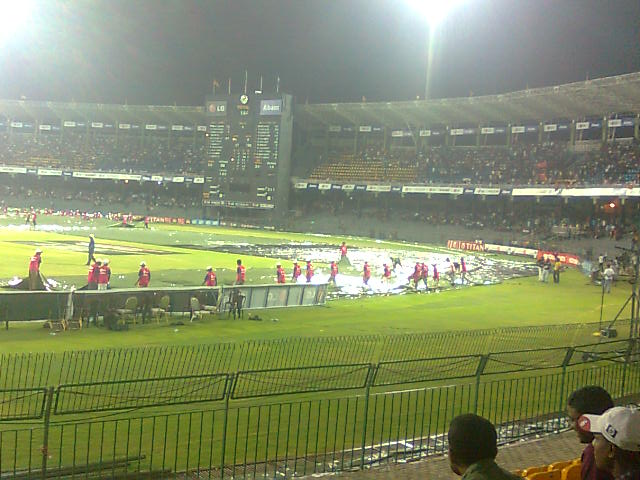
Premadasa Stadium being fully covered due to rain

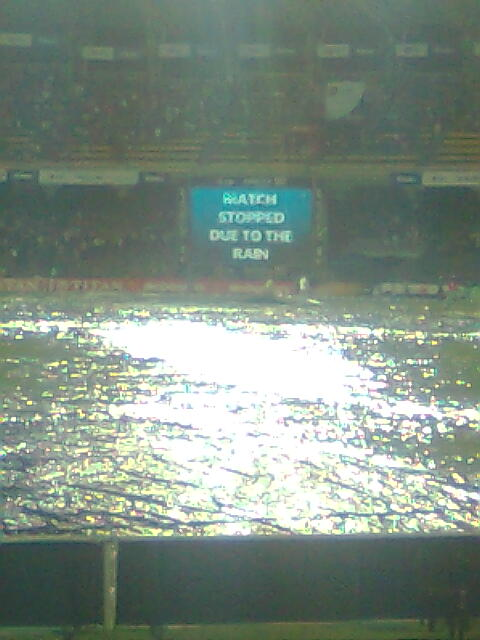
Ground fully masked by covers, August 2011

== See also ==
- List of stadiums by capacity
- List of Test cricket grounds
- List of international cricket grounds in Sri Lanka

Events and tenants
Preceded by Kensington Oval	ICC World Twenty20; Final Venue; 2012	Succeeded by Sher-e-Bangla
