= 2020 Maligawatta stampede =

2020 fatal stampede in Sri Lanka

- Date: 21 May 2020
- Time: 1:00pm
- Location: Maligawatta, Sri Lanka; 6°56′14″N 79°52′19″E
- Cause: stampede occurred during a charity program
- Deaths: 3
- Injuries: 9

The Maligawatta stampede was a fatal incident in Sri Lanka on 21 May 2020. It occurred near a Muslim Jumma residence in Maligawatta, Colombo-10, amid lockdown and curfew which was imposed in the area due to the COVID-19 pandemic. The incident happened around 1:00 p.m., while a charity donation program was being conducted to distribute money for Maligawatta area residents on the eve of Ramadan.

== Incident ==
Nearly 300 to 400 people were reported to have gathered in a queue during a private charity donation program conducted by businessman Zarook Hajiyar, based in Dehiwala, with the purpose of distributing funds of at least Rs. 5000 per person for area residents, especially the poor. Three women were killed due to the stampede. It was revealed that it happened due to panic and careless behaviour among women. Nine people were severely injured, including seven women; four women who were injured in the stampede were reported to be in critical condition after being admitted to the Colombo National Hospital.

Six suspects who were involved in relief distribution were arrested mainly for conducting such an event amid coronavirus and for not maintaining proper hygienic measures, ignoring the ban on public gatherings. Suspects related to the incident were remanded until 4 June.
