= Mawalgama =

- Village
- Location within Colombo District
- Coordinates: 6°54′55″N 80°07′49″E
- Country: Sri Lanka
- Province: Western Province
- District: Colombo District

Area
  - Land: 2.5 km^{2} (0.97 sq mi)
- Elevation: 36 m (118 ft)

Population (2012)
  - Total: 2,033
- Time zone: UTC+5:30 (Sri Lanka Standard Time Zone)
  - Summer (DST): UTC+6 (Summer time)

Mawalgama is a village in the Colombo District, Western Province, Sri Lanka. It is approximately 37 kn (69 km/h; 43 mph) east of Colombo and located on the Boralugoda-Mawalgama Road. The nearest railway station is the Kadugoda station.

In 2012 the population was 2,033, and is located 36 m (118 ft) above sea level.
