= Alakeshwara Archaeological Site =

- අලකේෂ්වර පුරාවිද්‍යා ස්ථානය அழகேசுவரன் தொல்பொருள் ஆய்வு இடம்
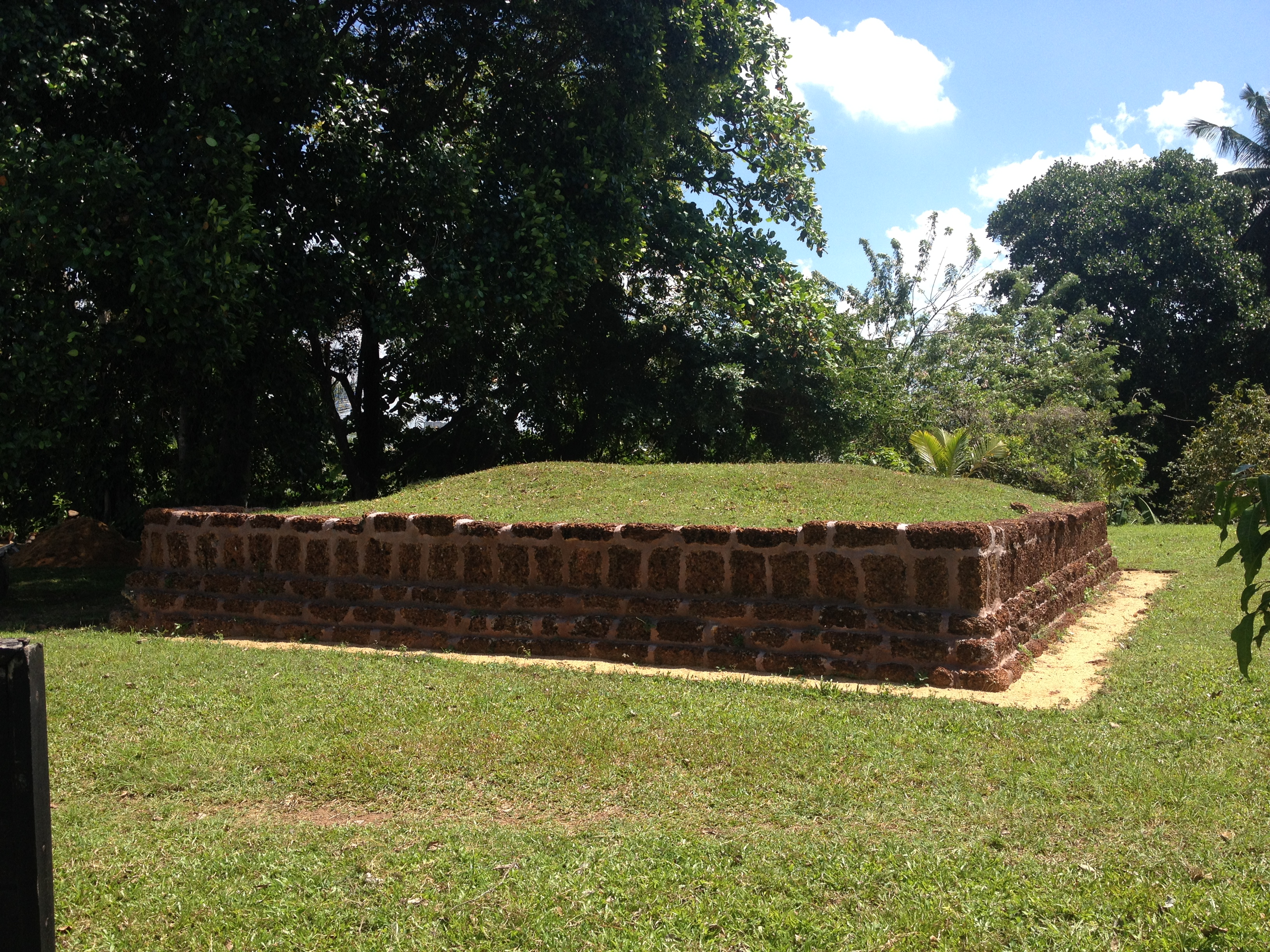
- Interactive map of the Alakeshwara Archaeological Site area
- Alternative names: Alakeshwara Palace or Alakeshwara Tomb

General information
- Type: Archaeological protected monument
- Location: Ethul Kotte, Sri Jayawardenepura Kotte, Sri Lanka
- Coordinates: 6°53′47.2″N 79°54′27.6″E
- Owner: Archaeological Department (Sri Lanka)

Alakeshwara Archaeological Site (also known as Alakeshwara Maligaya or Alakeshwara Sohona) is a historical site with archaeological ruins, situated in Sri Jayawardenepura Kotte, Western province, Sri Lanka. The site has been formally recognised by the Government as an archaeological protected monument in Sri Lanka.

The site consists of two rectangular-shaped building foundations, built out of Kabok stones. The two foundations are located close to each other and assumed to be the palace ruins of King Nissanka Alagakkonara (Alakeshwara), who was a minister of King Vikramabahu III of Gampola. The larger foundation is about 12 m (39 ft) length and 5.6 m (18 ft) wide while the smaller square foundation has a length and width of 6.6 m (22 ft). Architectural features and the artifacts found from the site, such as grinding stones and water filters collaborate the assumption that the site is the palace of Alakeshwara. However this site is also known as the mausoleum (tomb) of Alakeshwara, but there is no conclusive evidence to substantiate this claim.

== See also ==
- Kingdom of Kotte
