= Sri Pushparama Vihara, Balapitiya =

Sri Pushparama Vihara
- ශ්‍රී පුෂ්පාරාම විහාරය
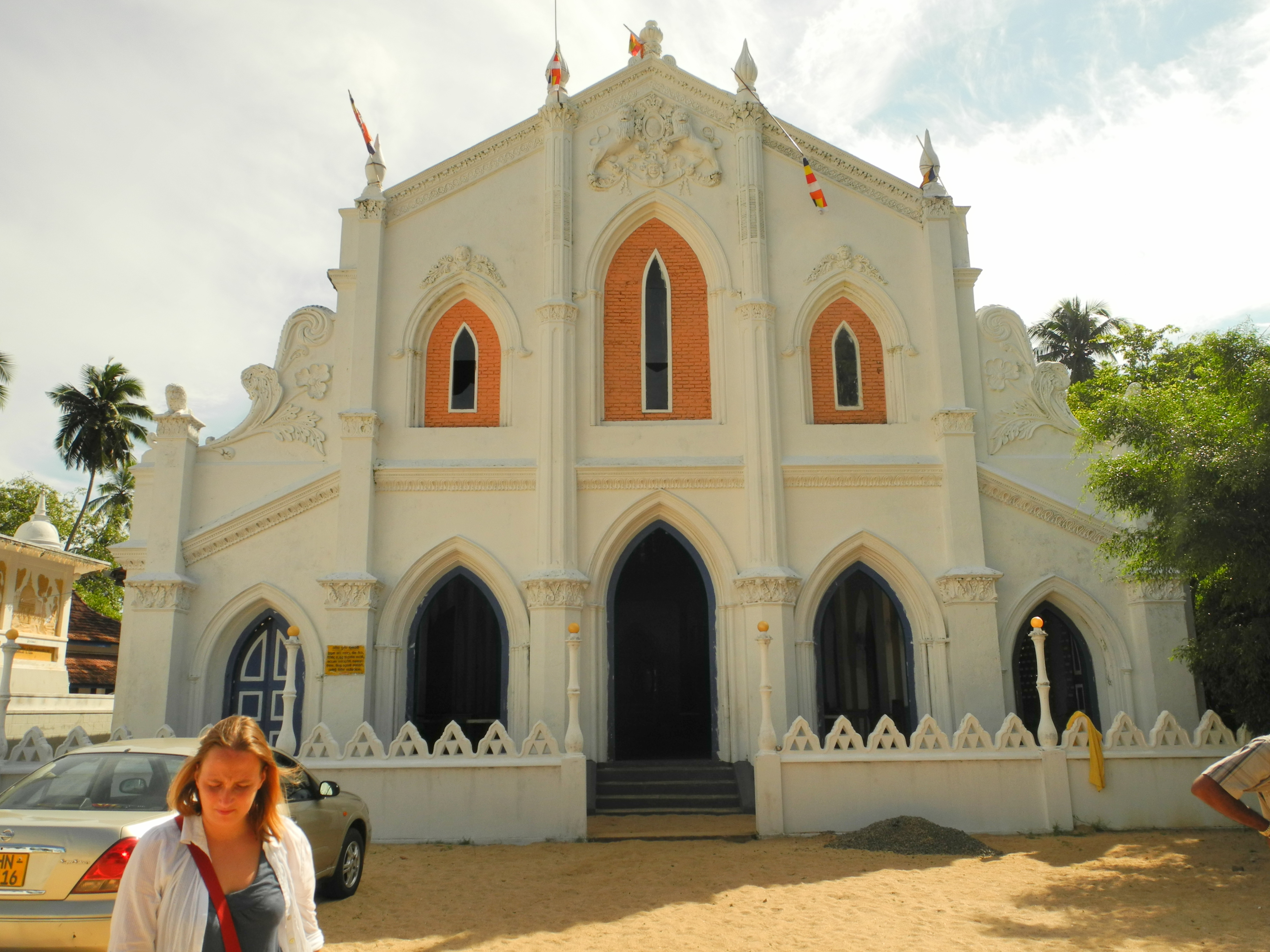
- The Dhamma discourse hall of the Vihara

Religion
- Affiliation: Buddhism
- District: Galle
- Province: Southern Province

Location
- Location: Welithara, Balapitiya, Sri Lanka
- Interactive map of Sri Pushparama Vihara
- Coordinates: 06°17′29.9″N 80°02′31.7″E

Architecture
- Type: Buddhist Temple
- Archaeological Protected Monument of Sri Lanka

Sri Pushparama Vihara (Sinhala: ශ්‍රී පුෂ්පාරාම විහාරය) is a historic Buddhist temple situated in Balapitiya, Southern province, Sri Lanka. The Vihara is also known as Nayaka Pansala (Head temple) as it serve as the headquarters for the Mulaghandi Sect of Amarapura Nikaya. It is located in on the Colombo-Galle main road approximately 1.5 km (0.93 mi) away from the Balapitiya town. The temple has been formally recognised by the Government as an archaeological site in Sri Lanka. The designation was declared on 6 June 2008 under the government Gazette number 1553.

The temple is popular among the devotees as its Dhamma discourse hall has very unusual architectural features similar to a Church. The design of the front facade as well as the doors and windows of the hall are based on colonial church architecture. Inside the hall, two wooden staircases from the two sides lead into a balcony which runs round the inner hall. On the top part of the facade is a British insignia with a date reading 2414 in Buddhist years.

== See also ==
- Sri Pushparama Vihara, Ratmalana
