= Kshetrarama Maha Vihara =

- ක්ෂේත්‍රාරාම මහා විහාරය
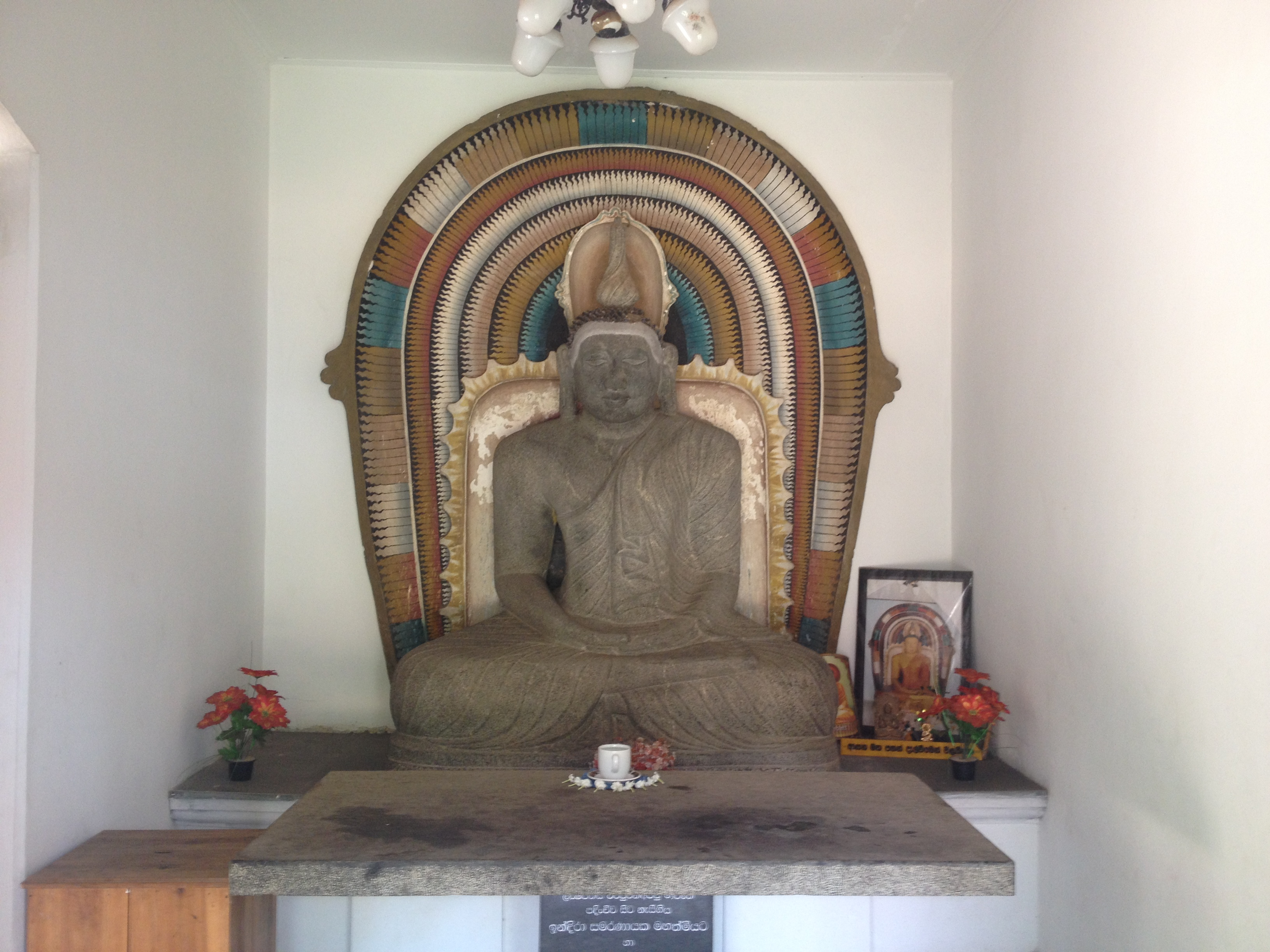
- The stone Buddha statue in the old image house

Religion
- Affiliation: Buddhism
- District: Colombo
- Province: Western Province

Location
- Location: Lakshapathiya, Moratuwa Sri Lanka
- Interactive map of Kshetrarama Maha Vihara
- Coordinates: 06°47′46.6″N 79°52′40.4″E

Architecture
- Type: Buddhist Temple
- Founder: Weligama Sri Sumanatissa thero
- Completed: 1829

Kshetrarama Maha Vihara (also known as Kekirideniya Pansala) (Sinhala: ක්ෂේත්‍රාරාම මහා විහාරය හෝ කැකිරිදෙනිය පන්සල) is a historic Buddhist temple situated in Moratuwa, Sri Lanka. It is located in the Lakshapathiya area, approximately 1.2 km (0.75 mi) from Katubedda junction on Colombo-Galle main road (A2). The temple has been formally recognized by the Government as an archaeological site in Sri Lanka.

== The temple ==
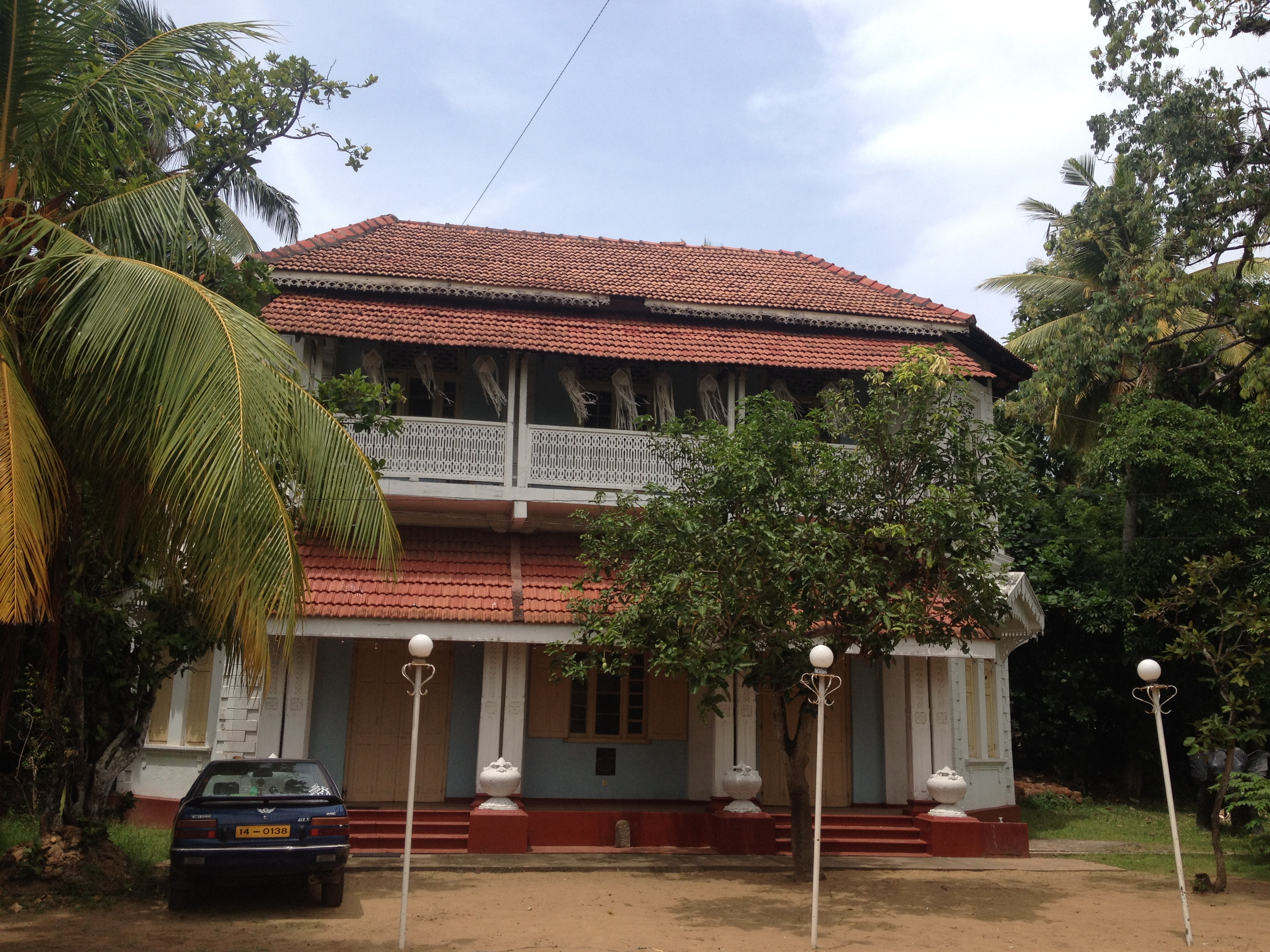
The two-storied Seema Malakaya building shows unique archaeological features. These cannot be seen at any other Buddhist shrine on the island and unique.

The Kshetrarama Temple at Lakshapathiya was established in 1829 by the chief monk, Ven. Weligama Sri Sumanatissa Thero. He resided at the Saranapala Maha Vihara in Walana during that period. Notable among the archaeological interests and monuments of the Vihara are the old Buddha shrine, the Seema Malakaya, and the Bhikkhu dwellings. The old image house, with a seated stone Buddha statue, gets special attention as it is a Kandyan era feature. However, its original appearance was altered as part of substantial renovation works which took place in 2012. The two-storeyed Seema Malakaya building of this temple appears to incorporate architectural features of the World War II period. It displays unique and rare features that aren't seen at any other Buddhist shrine in the country. This makes it a unique travel destination. The library of the temple stores many valuable ola leaf volumes containing the book of Tripiṭaka as well as other ancient volumes.
