= Maligawatta =

Maligawatta මාලිගාවත්ත மாளிகாவத்தை
- Suburb
- Location in Greater Colombo
- Coordinates: 6°56′14″N 79°52′19″E
- Country: Sri Lanka
- Province: Western Province
- District: Colombo District
- Time zone: UTC+5:30 (Sri Lanka Standard Time Zone)

Maligawatta is a suburb in Colombo, Sri Lanka. Maligawatta is located approximately 3 km (1.9 mi) north-east from the centre of Colombo, Colombo Fort. The name Maligawatta is from the Sinhalese language which translates into garden of the palace.

The R. Premadasa International Cricket Stadium is located in this area on Khettarama Road.

== History ==
King Rajasinha I of Sitawaka ordered a deep ditch to be dug, thereby draining the eastern approaches. He located his headquarters on a hill further back, which came to be known as Maligakanda (Palace hill) since he held court there. The fields adjacent became Maligawatte.

In May 1587, Rajasinha I of Sitawaka, having conquered the Kandyan Kingdom, laid siege to the Portuguese fort of Colombo, with 60,000 men, 150 guns, 11,600 muskets and firelocks and 120 war elephants. The siege lasted nine months, but the 350 Portuguese soldiers in Colombo held out.

Under the Portuguese, the city walls encompassed the Pettah, and the Beira Lake was much bigger than it is now. The fort could only be approached from the south and east, and a moat defended the eastern approaches. Rajasinha I of Sitawaka ordered a deep ditch to be dug, thereby draining the eastern approaches. He located his headquarters on a hill further back, which came to be known as Maligakanda, since he held court there. The fields adjacent became Maligawatte.

== See also ==
- 2020 Maligawatta stampede
