= Diddeniya =

- Village
- Location within Sri Lanka
- Coordinates: 7°22′47″N 80°35′21″E
- Country: Sri Lanka
- District: Kurunegala District
- Time zone: UTC+5:30 (SLST)
- Postal code: 60544

Diddeniya (Sinhala: දිද්දෙනිය; Tamil: டித்தேனியா) is a village in Kurunegala District, of North Western Province, Sri Lanka.

== See also ==
- List of towns in North Western Province, Sri Lanka
