= Kotte Divisional Secretariat =

Kotte Divisional Secretariat Sri Jayawardenapura Kotte Divisional Secretariat
- Divisional Secretariat
- Country: Sri Lanka
- Province: Western Province
- District: Colombo District

Area
  - Total: 6.32 sq mi (16.38 km^{2})

Population (2024 census)
  - Total: 96,189
- Time zone: UTC+5:30 (Sri Lanka Standard Time)

Kotte Divisional Secretariat is a Divisional Secretariat of Colombo District, of Western Province, Sri Lanka.

The Divisional Secretariat is larger than the Dehiwala, Rathmalana and Moratuwa Divisional Secretariats. The total extent utilised lands in Gramaniladhari divisions is about 1,523 ha (3,760 acres). It consists of twenty GS divisions, and is bounded by the Kolonnawa and Kaduwela Divisional secretariats to the north and east, the Maharagama and Thimbirigasyaya Divisional Secretariats to the south and west. This area is to be considered as Sri Jayawardenepura Kotte Municipal council area as well.

So that this area is highly urbanised due to some factors like being a main administrative capital, parliament complex and especially suburban area in the Colombo city. It has become highly populated with the developed road network and sufficient infrastructure facilities.

It is very clear the economic system of the area is basically focused on service sector. Accordingly, main professions of major population in the area base on service sector. In addition, clear development can be seen in the industrial sector. People who engage in the agriculture, are in minor population and part-time farmers are more than full-time farmers of that population.

Role performed at DS

Name	From	To
Sugathadasa Jayawikrama		
S. M. P. Samarakoon	1983	
Harisan Perera Wickramarathne		
Wimal Nugegodage		
Wijaya Karumarathna		
H. M. Sirisena		
Daya Peeris		
Remend Perera		
R. M. M. B. Rathnayaka		
Kalvin Gunawardhana		
Dhamitha Vitharana		
Manel Sugathapala	2005	2009
Chandrarathna Pallegama	2009 (Aug.)	2009 (Dec.)
Amal J. S. S. Edirisooriya	2009 (Dec.)	Up To Date

== Demography ==
Religion in Kotte DS Division (2012)
1. Buddhist (77.1%)
2. Hindu (4.50%)
3. Muslim (6.30%)
4. Roman Catholic (7.30%)
5. Other Christian (4.70%)
6. Other (0.10%)
