= Balapokuna Raja Maha Vihara =

Buddhist temple in Colombo District, Sri Lanka

- බලපොකුණ රජ මහා විහාරය (Balapokuna Raja Maha Vihara) Balapokuna Great Royal Temple
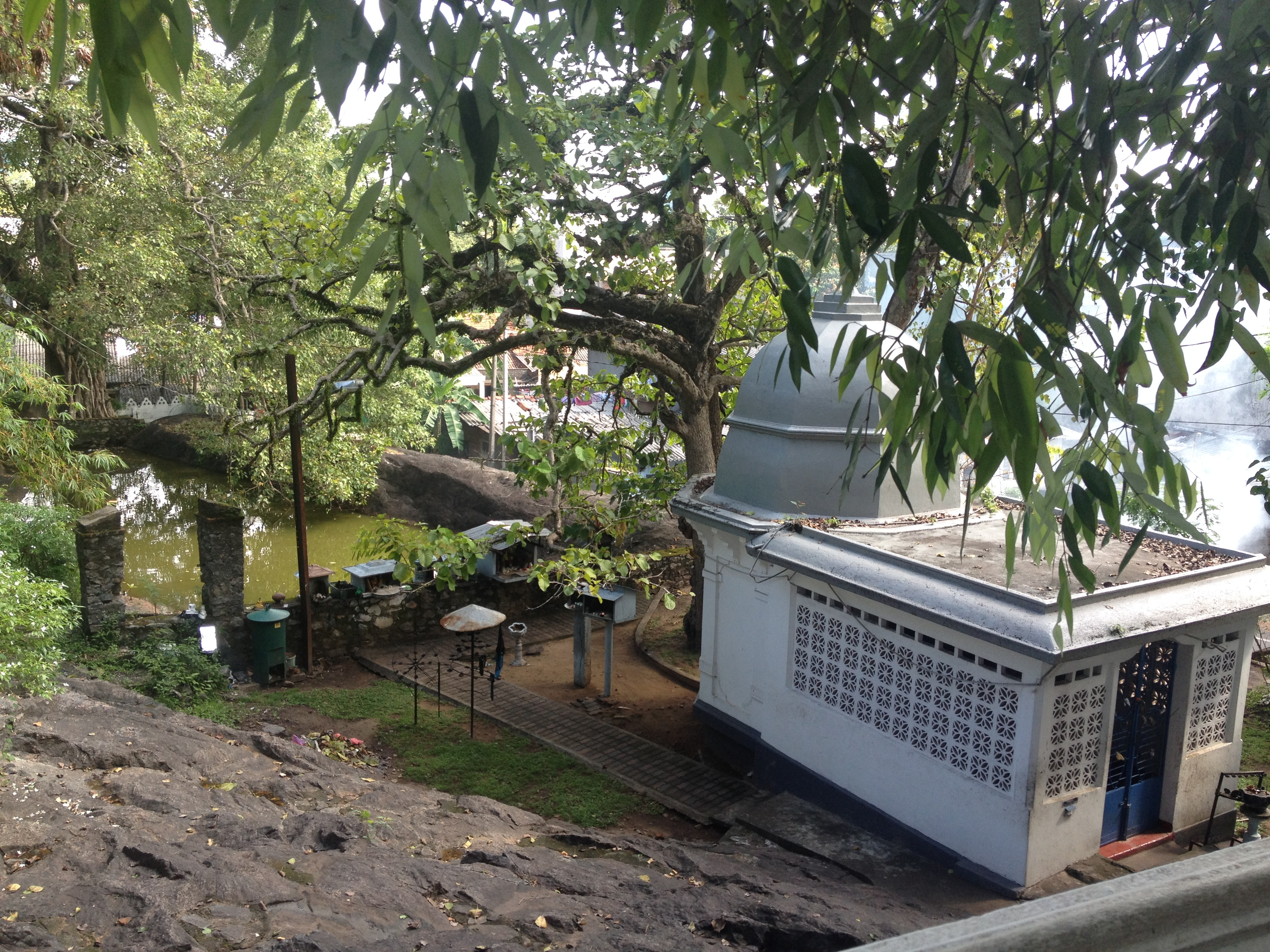
- The ancient pond and Devalaya

Religion
- Affiliation: Buddhism
- District: Colombo
- Province: Western Province

Location
- Location: Pamankada, Sri Lanka
- Interactive map of Balapokuna Raja Maha Vihara
- Coordinates: 06°52′21.0″N 79°52′40.1″E

Architecture
- Type: Buddhist Temple

Balapokuna Raja Maha Vihara (Sinhala: බලපොකුණ රජ මහා විහාරය, English: Seruwila Mangala Great Royal Temple) is a historic Buddhist temple situated in Pamankada, Western Province, Sri Lanka. It is located near to the 6th mile post junction on Colombo-Batticaloa main road. The temple has been formally recognised by the Government as an archaeological site in Sri Lanka. The designation was declared on 6 June 2008 under the government Gazette number 1553. As part of the name of several temples, Raja Maha Vihara means in English: Great Royal Temple or Great Royal Monastery. It designates ancient Sri Lankan Buddhist temples that historically received royal patronage and donations from the king.

== Balapokuna ==
Balapokuna Vihara has got its name because of the Balapokuna, a natural pond located on a rock surface in the Vihara premises. In the early periods the pond was called as "Batapokuna" and the name had been derived from the Sinhalese word "Bata" which meaning soldiers. During the reign of King Parakramabahu VI the water of the pond had been used by his soldiers and later the name Batapokuna was gradually evolved to its present name Balapokuna.

According to popular legend, Balapokuna is an exit point to the ancient tunnel which runs from Kotte, the others being at the Kotte Ananda Shastralaya and the Pita Kotte Gal Ambalama.
