= Lambrick Hall =

General information
- Location: Kotte, Sri Lanka
- Named for: Reverend Samuel Lambrick
- Groundbreaking: 8 November 1827
- Completed: 1828
- Opened: 1828

Technical details
- Floor count: one
- Floor area: 943sqm

Lambrick Hall (Sinhala: ලැම්බ්‍රික් ශාලාව) is a heritage-listed building, located on the grounds of Sri Jayawardenepura Maha Vidyalaya, in Colombo, Sri Lanka.

This single-storey building was constructed in 1827 by Reverend Samuel Lambrick (1806–1884), when he established the Cotta Institute, a Christian seminary operated by the Church Missionary Society. This then became known as the Christian Missionary College, the Church Missionary Society Boys' School and when the administration of the school was taken over by the government in 1964, Sri Jayawardenepura Maha Vidyalaya.

== History ==
In 1799 a group of clergymen and lay members of the Church of England established the Church Missionary Society and in 1817 sent four missionaries, Reverends Samuel Lambrick, Benjamin Ward, Robert Mayer and Joseph Knight to the British Colony of Ceylon. On 13 July 1822 Lambrick received a government grant of land from Governor Edward Paget, and purchased eight other adjoining land parcels, a total of approximately 2.0 ha (5 acres), adjacent to Diyawanna Oya, to establish a church mission. He constructed a dwelling on the land and began a school, which he conducted under the dwelling's verandah for twenty English and Sinhalese students.

On 8 November 1827 Governor Edward Barnes laid the foundation stone for what became the Cotta Institute, a theological college for training Ceylonese as Christian teachers and priests. The building was completed in early 1828 and the institute opened with fifteen students, who were taught English, Science, Mathematics, Latin, Greek, Pali and Philology. The first public examination was held in 1831 and was attended by Governor Robert Wilmot-Horton. In 1834, the Bishop of Calcutta, Dr. Wilson visited the Cotta Institution and examined the students in Latin, Greek and the Hebrew Bible.

== Architecture ==
The hall is built in a typical British-Ceylonese style of architecture, with 23 round columns, corridors, and a single roof. It consists of a central hall, with a series of surrounding rooms at the front and sides of the building and external verandahs. The roof has four sloping sections and has been renovated in recent times but the columns and the wooden doors and frames still bear witness to the building's original 19th-century colonial architecture.

The building, including the verandahs, was originally 41 m × 23 m (136 ft × 75 ft) and the hall, used principally for examinations, was 15.2 m × 7.6 m (50 ft × 25 ft), with an adjoining room under the main roof, used as a library. On either end of the building were a set of four or five rooms to house instructors/teachers. To the north of the hall was a smaller two-storey building, which housed a printing press and book bindery on the ground floor with a dining room and student dormitory on the upper floor. To the north of that building was the Lambrick's residence.

The building is currently used by the school as an indoor sports complex.
