= Pamankada =

Pamankada පාමංකඩ பாமன்கடை
- Suburb
- Location within Colombo District Location within Sri Lanka
- Coordinates: 6°52′31″N 79°52′31″E
- Country: Sri Lanka
- Province: Western Province
- District: Colombo District
- Time zone: UTC+5:30 (Sri Lanka Standard Time Zone)
- Postal Code: 00600

Pamankada is a suburb in Colombo, Sri Lanka. It is also part of the area numbered Colombo 6 and its postcode is 00600. The Colombo - Horana Road runs through the center of the town and connects to High Level Road and Havelock Road. Neighbouring suburbs are Kirulapana, Kohuwela, Dehiwela, Wellawatte and Bambalapitiya.

== Tourist attractions ==
- Pamankada Balapokuna is an ancient pond located in the Balapokuna Raja Maha Vihara premises.
