= Sri Pushparama Vihara, Ratmalana =

Temple in Sri Lanka

Sri Pushparama Vihara
- ශ්‍රී පුෂ්පාරාම විහාරය
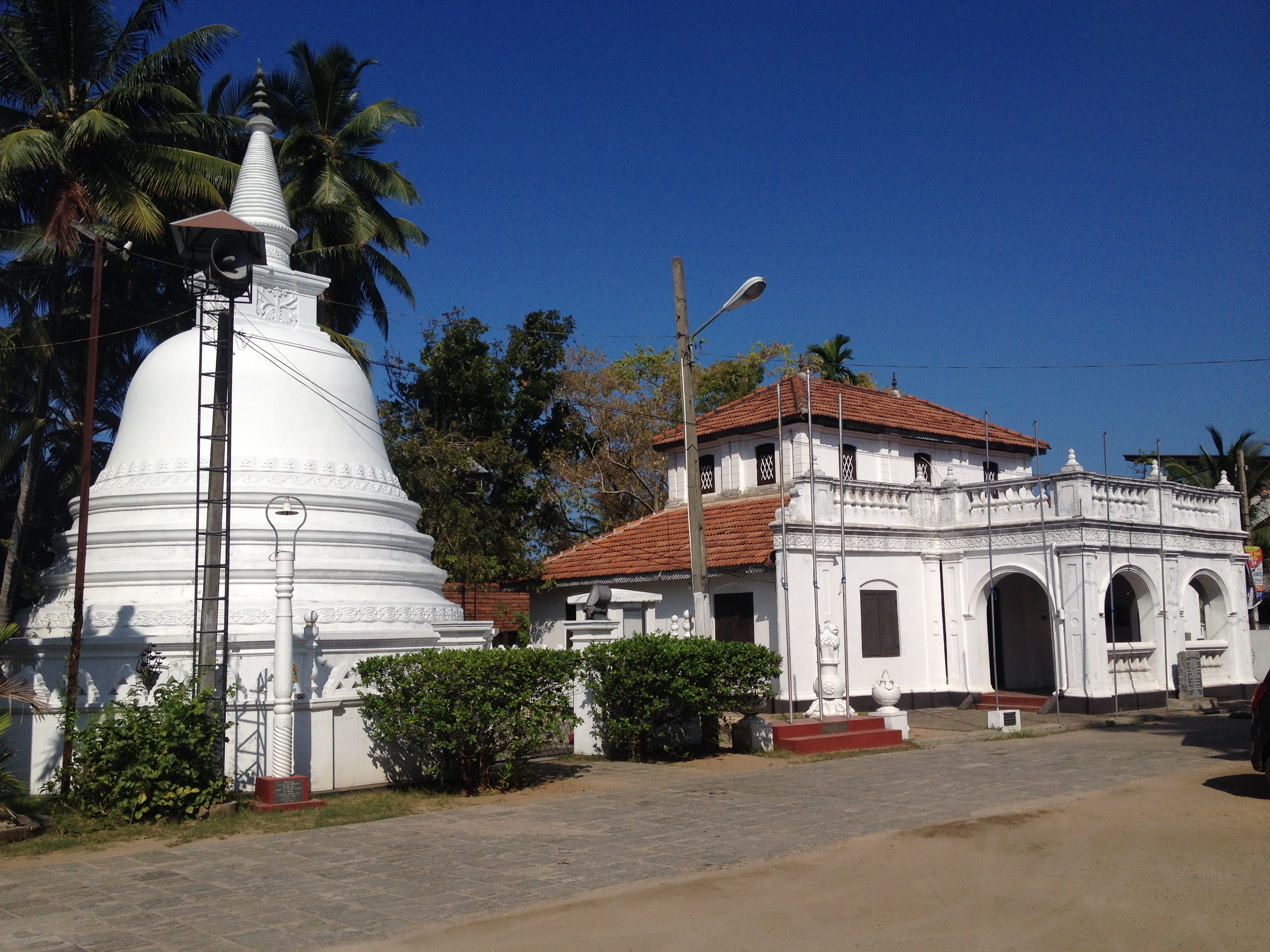
- The Stupa and Image house

Religion
- Affiliation: Buddhism
- District: Colombo
- Province: Western Province

Location
- Location: Ratmalana, Sri Lanka
- Interactive map of Sri Pushparama Vihara
- Coordinates: 06°49′18.4″N 79°52′16.2″E

Architecture
- Type: Buddhist Temple
- Founder: Balapitiye Dheerananda thera
- Completed: 1795 – 1800

Sri Pushparama Vihara (Sinhala: ශ්‍රී පුෂ්පාරාම විහාරය) is a historic Buddhist temple situated in Ratmalana, Western province, Sri Lanka. It is located at Sri Dharmarama junction on the Colombo-Galle main road. The temple has been formally recognised by the Government as an archaeological site in Sri Lanka. The designation was declared on 23 February 2007 under the government Gazette number 1486.

== See also ==
- Sri Pushparama Vihara, Balapitiya
