= Samudrasanna Vihara =

Galkissa Samudrasanna Vihara
- ගල්කිස්ස සමුද්‍රාසන්න විහාරය
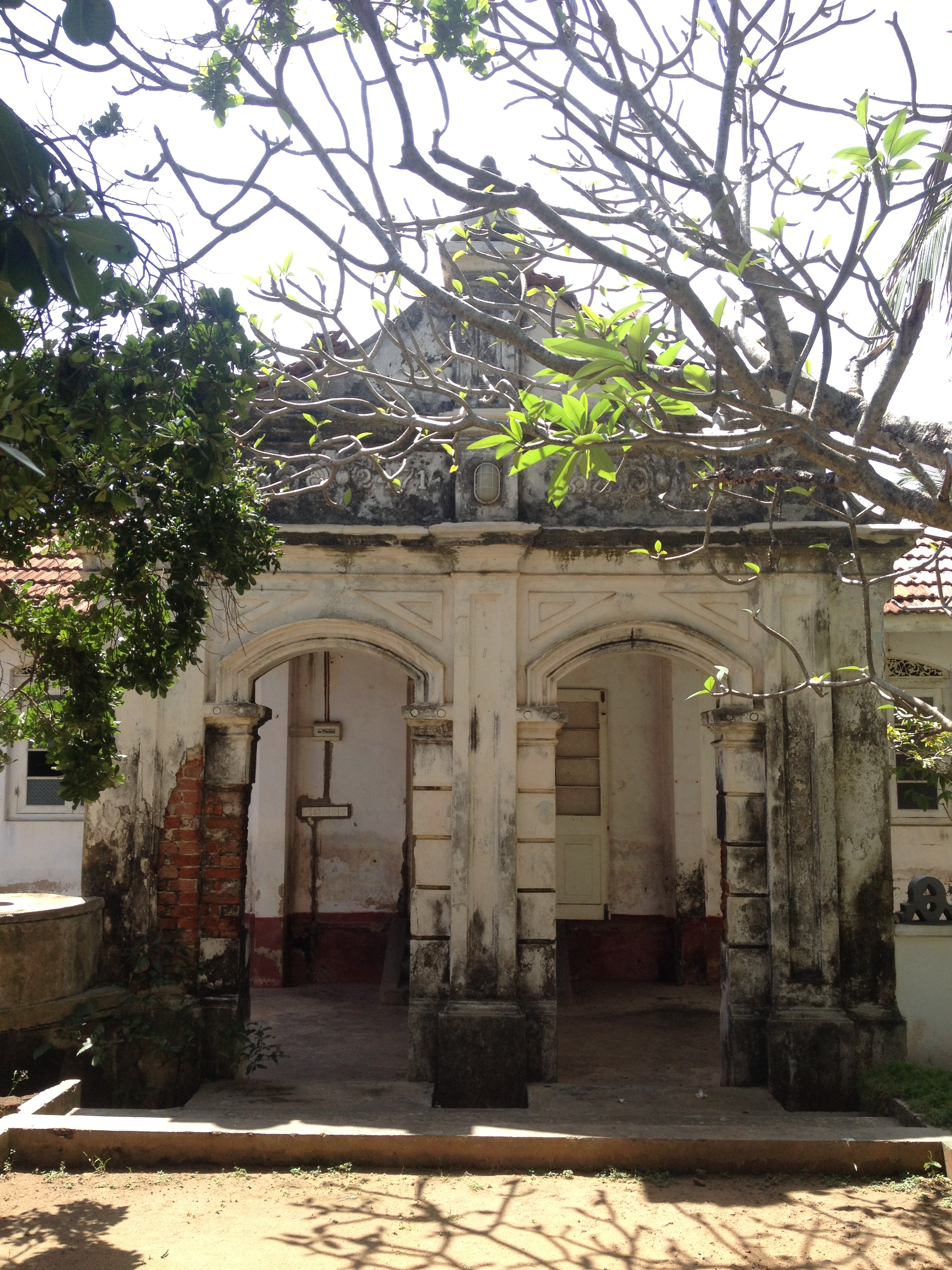
- Entrance of the image house

Religion
- Affiliation: Buddhism
- District: Colombo
- Province: Western Province

Location
- Location: Mount-Lavinia, Sri Lanka
- Interactive map of Galkissa Samudrasanna Vihara
- Coordinates: 06°49′44.1″N 79°51′50.7″E

Architecture
- Type: Buddhist Temple
- Completed: 1845

Samudrasanna Vihara (Sinhala: සමුද්‍රාසන්න විහාරය) is a historic Buddhist temple situated at Mount-Lavinia in the Western province, Sri Lanka. It is located near to the Templers road junction on the Colombo-Galle main road. The temple has been formally recognised by the Government as an archaeological site in Sri Lanka. The designation was declared on 6 June 2008 under the government Gazette number 1553.
