= Ratmalana Polling Division =

Ratmalana
- Polling Division
- Coordinates: 6.831812°N 79.874140°E
- Country: Sri Lanka
- Province: Western Province, Sri Lanka
- Electoral District: Colombo Electoral District

Area
  - Total: 14.35 km^{2} (5.54 sq mi)

Population (2012)
  - Total: 95,506
  - Density: 6,655/km^{2} (17,240/sq mi)
- ISO 3166 code: EC-01G

The Ratmalana Polling Division is a Polling Division in the Colombo Electoral District, in the Western Province, Sri Lanka.

== Presidential Election Results ==
=== Summary ===
Ratmalana has matched the country result 8 out of 8 times. Hence, Ratmalana is a Bellwether for Presidential Elections.

Year	Ratmalana	Colombo Electoral District	MAE %	Sri Lanka	MAE %
2019	SLPP	SLPP	1.53%	SLPP	0.62%
2015	NDF	NDF	0.21%	NDF	4.16%
2010	UPFA	UPFA	0.16%	UPFA	5.01%
2005	UPFA	UNP	2.83%	UPFA	0.35%
1999	PA	PA	3.26%	PA	1.70%
1994	PA	PA	4.08%	PA	6.50%
1988	UNP	UNP	1.26%	UNP	2.49%
1982	UNP	UNP	1.42%	UNP	2.43%
Matches/Mean MAE	8/8	7/8	1.85%	8/8	2.91%

=== 2019 Sri Lankan Presidential Election ===
Party	Ratmalana		Colombo Electoral District		Sri Lanka	
Party	Votes	%	Votes	%	Votes	%
SLPP	28,085	51.48%	727,713	53.19%	6,924,255	52.25%
NDF	23,156	42.45%	559,921	40.92%	5,564,239	41.99%
NMPP	2,124	3.89%	53,803	3.93%	418,553	3.16%
Other Parties (with < 1%)	1,185	2.17%	26,740	1.95%	345,452	2.61%
Valid Votes	54,550	98.74%	1,368,177	98.89%	13,252,499	98.99%
Rejected Votes	698	1.26%	15,333	1.11%	135,452	1.01%
Total Polled	55,248	79.92%	1,383,510	82.82%	13,387,951	83.71%
Registered Electors	69,128		1,670,403		15,992,568	

=== 2015 Sri Lankan Presidential Election ===
Party	Ratmalana		Colombo Electoral District		Sri Lanka	
Party	Votes	%	Votes	%	Votes	%
NDF	29,554	55.76%	725,073	55.93%	6,217,162	51.28%
UPFA	23,144	43.66%	562,614	43.40%	5,768,090	47.58%
Other Parties (with < 1%)	306	0.58%	8,673	0.67%	138,200	1.14%
Valid Votes	53,004	98.73%	1,296,360	98.83%	12,123,452	98.85%
Rejected Votes	680	1.27%	15,334	1.17%	140,925	1.15%
Total Polled	53,684	80.37%	1,311,694	81.34%	12,264,377	78.69%
Registered Electors	66,793		1,612,660		15,585,942	

=== 2010 Sri Lankan Presidential Election ===
Party	Ratmalana		Colombo Electoral District		Sri Lanka	
Party	Votes	%	Votes	%	Votes	%
UPFA	26,215	53.16%	614,740	52.93%	6,015,934	57.88%
NDF	22,589	45.80%	533,022	45.90%	4,173,185	40.15%
Other Parties (with < 1%)	512	1.04%	13,620	1.17%	204,494	1.97%
Valid Votes	49,316	98.97%	1,161,382	99.03%	10,393,613	99.03%
Rejected Votes	512	1.03%	11,394	0.97%	101,838	0.97%
Total Polled	49,828	74.79%	1,172,776	76.09%	10,495,451	66.70%
Registered Electors	66,622		1,541,242		15,734,587	

=== 2005 Sri Lankan Presidential Election ===
Party	Ratmalana		Colombo Electoral District		Sri Lanka	
Party	Votes	%	Votes	%	Votes	%
UPFA	25,004	50.84%	534,431	47.96%	4,887,152	50.29%
UNP	23,743	48.28%	569,627	51.12%	4,706,366	48.43%
Other Parties (with < 1%)	434	0.88%	10,192	0.91%	123,521	1.27%
Valid Votes	49,181	98.88%	1,114,250	98.86%	9,717,039	98.88%
Rejected Votes	557	1.12%	12,879	1.14%	109,869	1.12%
Total Polled	49,738	74.87%	1,127,129	75.85%	9,826,908	69.51%
Registered Electors	66,432		1,486,021		14,136,979	

=== 1999 Sri Lankan Presidential Election ===
Party	Ratmalana		Colombo Electoral District		Sri Lanka	
Party	Votes	%	Votes	%	Votes	%
PA	22,868	52.02%	474,310	49.18%	4,312,157	51.12%
UNP	17,572	39.97%	425,185	44.08%	3,602,748	42.71%
JVP	2,514	5.72%	44,009	4.56%	343,927	4.08%
Other Parties (with < 1%)	525	1.19%	12,821	1.33%	140,825	1.67%
SMBP	485	1.10%	8,209	0.85%	35,854	0.43%
Valid Votes	43,964	96.70%	964,534	97.06%	8,435,754	97.69%
Rejected Votes	1,500	3.30%	29,197	2.94%	199,536	2.31%
Total Polled	45,464	71.64%	993,731	73.39%	8,635,290	72.17%
Registered Electors	63,466		1,354,025		11,965,536	

=== 1994 Sri Lankan Presidential Election ===
Party	Ratmalana		Colombo Electoral District		Sri Lanka	
Party	Votes	%	Votes	%	Votes	%
PA	28,666	69.04%	557,708	64.82%	4,709,205	62.28%
UNP	12,275	29.56%	288,741	33.56%	2,715,283	35.91%
Other Parties (with < 1%)	578	1.39%	13,937	1.62%	137,040	1.81%
Valid Votes	41,519	97.91%	860,386	98.17%	7,561,526	98.03%
Rejected Votes	887	2.09%	16,060	1.83%	151,706	1.97%
Total Polled	42,406	70.97%	876,446	69.59%	7,713,232	69.12%
Registered Electors	59,749		1,259,484		11,158,880	

=== 1988 Sri Lankan Presidential Election ===
Party	Ratmalana		Colombo Electoral District		Sri Lanka	
Party	Votes	%	Votes	%	Votes	%
UNP	18,409	47.82%	361,337	49.14%	2,569,199	50.43%
SLFP	18,308	47.55%	339,958	46.23%	2,289,857	44.95%
SLMP	1,783	4.63%	34,020	4.63%	235,701	4.63%
Valid Votes	38,500	98.51%	735,315	98.49%	5,094,754	98.24%
Rejected Votes	584	1.49%	11,295	1.51%	91,499	1.76%
Total Polled	39,084	70.74%	746,610	67.53%	5,186,256	55.87%
Registered Electors	55,248		1,105,583		9,283,143	

=== 1982 Sri Lankan Presidential Election ===
Party	Ratmalana		Colombo Electoral District		Sri Lanka	
Party	Votes	%	Votes	%	Votes	%
UNP	21,280	55.88%	436,290	57.86%	3,450,815	52.93%
SLFP	14,111	37.05%	274,476	36.40%	2,546,348	39.05%
JVP	1,670	4.39%	28,580	3.79%	273,428	4.19%
LSSP	778	2.04%	9,655	1.28%	58,531	0.90%
Other Parties (with < 1%)	245	0.64%	5,030	0.67%	190,929	2.93%
Valid Votes	38,084	98.92%	754,031	98.95%	6,520,156	98.78%
Rejected Votes	415	1.08%	7,990	1.05%	80,470	1.22%
Total Polled	38,499	76.59%	762,021	76.88%	6,600,626	80.15%
Registered Electors	50,269		991,194		8,235,358	

== Parliamentary Election Results ==
=== Summary ===
The winner of Ratmalana has matched the final country result 6 out of 7 times.

Year	Ratmalana	Colombo Electoral District	MAE %	Sri Lanka	MAE %
2015	UNP	UNP	0.40%	UNP	5.14%
2010	UPFA	UPFA	2.27%	UPFA	10.21%
2004	UPFA	UNP	1.99%	UPFA	3.52%
2001	UNP	UNP	2.62%	UNP	2.11%
2000	UNP	UNP	1.74%	PA	3.34%
1994	PA	PA	6.60%	PA	8.46%
1989	UNP	UNP	4.94%	UNP	3.75%
Matches/Mean MAE	6/7	5/7	2.94%	7/7	5.22%

=== 2020 Sri Lankan Parliamentary Election ===
Party	Ratmalana		Colombo Electoral District		Sri Lanka	
Party	Votes	%	Votes	%	Votes	%
SLPFA	25,320	54.69%	674,603	57.04%	6,853,693	59.09%
SJB	15,646	33.79%	387,145	32.73%	2,771,984	23.9%
JJB	2,901	6.27%	67,600	5.72%	445,958	3.84%
UNP	1,440	3.11%	30,875	2.61%	249,435	2.15%
Other Parties (with < 1%)	944	2.14%	22,553	1.9%	1,227,859	11.02%
Valid Votes	46,301	65.65%	1,182,776	69.2%	11,598,936	71.32%
Rejected Votes	3,254	4.61%	81,034	4.74%	744,373	4.58%
Total Polled	49,555	70.26%	1,263,810	73.94%	12,343,309	75.89%
Registered Electors	70,528		1,709,209		16,263,885	

=== 2015 Sri Lankan Parliamentary Election ===
Party	Ratmalana		Colombo Electoral District		Sri Lanka	
Party	Votes	%	Votes	%	Votes	%
UNP	26,412	53.52%	640,743	53.04%	5,098,916	45.77%
UPFA	19,203	38.91%	474,063	39.25%	4,732,664	42.48%
JVP	3,217	6.52%	81,391	6.74%	544,154	4.88%
Other Parties (with < 1%)	519	1.05%	11,752	0.97%	93,045	0.84%
Valid Votes	49,351	96.71%	1,207,949	96.46%	11,140,333	95.35%
Rejected Votes	1,634	3.20%	43,372	3.46%	516,926	4.42%
Total Polled	51,028	76.40%	1,252,271	78.93%	11,684,111	77.66%
Registered Electors	66,793		1,586,598		15,044,490	

=== 2010 Sri Lankan Parliamentary Election ===
Party	Ratmalana		Colombo Electoral District		Sri Lanka	
Party	Votes	%	Votes	%	Votes	%
UPFA	19,486	48.43%	480,896	51.23%	4,846,388	60.38%
UNP	15,384	38.23%	339,750	36.19%	2,357,057	29.37%
DNA	5,061	12.58%	110,683	11.79%	441,251	5.50%
Other Parties (with < 1%)	308	0.77%	7,182	0.77%	47,940	0.60%
Valid Votes	40,239	95.23%	938,723	94.85%	8,026,322	96.03%
Rejected Votes	1,990	4.71%	50,354	5.09%	581,465	6.96%
Total Polled	42,253	63.42%	989,729	64.17%	8,358,246	59.29%
Registered Electors	66,622		1,542,457		14,097,690	

=== 2004 Sri Lankan Parliamentary Election ===
Party	Ratmalana		Colombo Electoral District		Sri Lanka	
Party	Votes	%	Votes	%	Votes	%
UPFA	19,284	40.86%	414,688	39.20%	4,223,126	45.70%
UNP	18,448	39.09%	441,841	41.77%	3,486,792	37.73%
JHU	9,085	19.25%	190,618	18.02%	552,723	5.98%
Other Parties (with < 1%)	380	0.81%	10,713	1.01%	90,868	0.98%
Valid Votes	47,197	96.85%	1,057,860	96.47%	9,241,931	94.52%
Rejected Votes	1,531	3.14%	38,605	3.52%	534,452	5.47%
Total Polled	48,733	72.55%	1,096,571	74.71%	9,777,821	75.74%
Registered Electors	67,176		1,467,751		12,909,631	

=== 2001 Sri Lankan Parliamentary Election ===
Party	Ratmalana		Colombo Electoral District		Sri Lanka	
Party	Votes	%	Votes	%	Votes	%
UNP	23,432	48.20%	546,417	51.62%	4,086,026	45.62%
PA	17,344	35.68%	353,401	33.39%	3,330,815	37.19%
JVP	5,750	11.83%	117,404	11.09%	815,353	9.10%
SU	1,014	2.09%	16,970	1.60%	50,665	0.57%
TULF	571	1.17%	12,696	1.20%	348,164	3.89%
Other Parties (with < 1%)	503	1.03%	11,593	1.10%	162,452	1.81%
Valid Votes	48,614	96.69%	1,058,481	96.28%	8,955,844	94.77%
Rejected Votes	1,664	3.31%	40,901	3.72%	494,009	5.23%
Total Polled	50,278	74.04%	1,099,382	76.31%	9,449,878	76.03%
Registered Electors	67,911		1,440,682		12,428,762	

=== 2000 Sri Lankan Parliamentary Election ===
Party	Ratmalana		Colombo Electoral District		Sri Lanka	
Party	Votes	%	Votes	%	Votes	%
UNP	18,556	40.24%	440,684	43.45%	3,451,765	40.12%
PA	17,886	38.78%	394,146	38.86%	3,899,329	45.33%
JVP	4,454	9.66%	78,133	7.70%	518,725	6.03%
SU	3,356	7.28%	49,671	4.90%	127,859	1.49%
Other Parties (with < 1%)	1,316	2.85%	24,519	2.42%	189,490	2.20%
NUA	548	1.19%	27,067	2.67%	185,593	2.16%
Valid Votes	46,116	N/A	1,014,220	N/A	8,602,617	N/A

=== 1994 Sri Lankan Parliamentary Election ===
Party	Ratmalana		Colombo Electoral District		Sri Lanka	
Party	Votes	%	Votes	%	Votes	%
PA	25,967	58.96%	469,642	50.94%	3,887,805	48.94%
UNP	15,860	36.01%	385,100	41.77%	3,498,370	44.04%
MEP	1,061	2.41%	42,734	4.64%	68,538	0.86%
SLPF	666	1.51%	11,454	1.24%	90,078	1.13%
Other Parties (with < 1%)	485	1.10%	13,003	1.41%	51,995	0.65%
Valid Votes	44,039	96.38%	921,933	96.18%	7,943,688	95.20%
Rejected Votes	1,652	3.62%	36,635	3.82%	400,395	4.80%
Total Polled	45,691	76.47%	958,568	76.04%	8,344,095	74.75%
Registered Electors	59,749		1,260,686		11,163,064	

=== 1989 Sri Lankan Parliamentary Election ===
Party	Ratmalana		Colombo Electoral District		Sri Lanka	
Party	Votes	%	Votes	%	Votes	%
UNP	21,237	56.12%	374,530	51.67%	2,838,005	50.71%
SLFP	13,063	34.52%	205,053	28.29%	1,785,369	31.90%
USA	1,500	3.96%	31,873	4.40%	141,983	2.54%
MEP	1,407	3.72%	76,966	10.62%	90,480	1.62%
SLMC	415	1.10%	29,308	4.04%	202,016	3.61%
Other Parties (with < 1%)	217	0.57%	7,112	0.98%	67,723	1.21%
Valid Votes	37,839	95.94%	724,842	95.36%	5,596,468	93.87%
Rejected Votes	1,602	4.06%	35,271	4.64%	365,563	6.13%
Total Polled	39,441	72.61%	760,113	69.87%	5,962,031	63.60%
Registered Electors	54,316		1,087,891		9,374,164	

== Demographics ==
=== Ethnicity ===
The Ratmalana Polling Division has a Sinhalese majority (78.9%) . In comparison, the Colombo Electoral District (which contains the Ratmalana Polling Division) has a Sinhalese majority (76.5%), a significant Moor population (10.7%) and a significant Sri Lankan Tamil population (10.1%)

Ethnicity in Ratmalana
1. Sinhalese (78.9%)
2. Moor (9.70%)
3. Sri Lankan Tamil (8.30%)
4. Other (1.90%)
5. Burgher (1.10%)

=== Religion ===
The Ratmalana Polling Division has a Buddhist majority (70.0%) and a significant Muslim population (11.3%) . In comparison, the Colombo Electoral District (which contains the Ratmalana Polling Division) has a Buddhist majority (70.2%) and a significant Muslim population (11.8%)

Religion in Ratmalana
1. Buddhist (70.0%)
2. Muslim (11.3%)
3. Roman Catholic (7.50%)
4. Hindu (6.00%)
5. Other Christian (5.10%)
6. Other (0.10%)
