= Ratmalana Divisional Secretariat =

- Divisional Secretariat
- Country: Sri Lanka
- Province: Western Province
- District: Colombo District
- Time zone: UTC+5:30 (Sri Lanka Standard Time)

Ratmalana Divisional Secretariat is a Divisional Secretariat of Colombo District, of Western Province, Sri Lanka.

== Demography ==
Religion in Ratmalana DS Division (2012)
1. Buddhist (70.0%)
2. Hindu (6.00%)
3. Muslim (11.3%)
4. Roman Catholic (7.50%)
5. Other Christian (5.10%)
6. Other (0.10%)
