= Palagama Grama Niladhari Division =

Palagama
- Grama Niladhari Division
- Interactive map of Palagama
- Coordinates: 6.763910°N 79.964806°E
- Country: Sri Lanka
- Province: Western Province
- District: Colombo District
- Divisional Secretariat: Homagama Divisional Secretariat
- Electoral District: Colombo Electoral District
- Polling Division: Homagama Polling Division

Area
  - Total: 1.83 km^{2} (0.71 sq mi)
- Elevation: 20 m (66 ft)

Population (2012)
  - Total: 2,418
  - Density: 1,321/km^{2} (3,420/sq mi)
- ISO 3166 code: LK-1112400

Palagama

Palagama Grama Niladhari Division is a Grama Niladhari Division of the Homagama Divisional Secretariat of Colombo District of Western Province, Sri Lanka . It has Grama Niladhari Division Code 599.

Palagama is a surrounded by the Welmilla, Kidelpitiya West, Ambalangoda, Heraliyawala and weniwelkola Grama Niladhari Divisions.

== Demographics ==
=== Ethnicity ===
The Palagama Grama Niladhari Division has a Sinhalese majority (98.9%) . In comparison, the Homagama Divisional Secretariat (which contains the Palagama Grama Niladhari Division) has a Sinhalese majority (98.1%)

Ethnicity in Palagama
1. Sinhalese (98.9%)
2. Other (1.10%)

=== Religion ===
The Palagama Grama Niladhari Division has a Buddhist majority (97.6%) . In comparison, the Homagama Divisional Secretariat (which contains the Palagama Grama Niladhari Division) has a Buddhist majority (96.2%)

Religion in Palagama
1. Buddhist (97.6%)
2. Other (2.40%)
