= Henawatta Grama Niladhari Division =

Henawatta
- Grama Niladhari Division
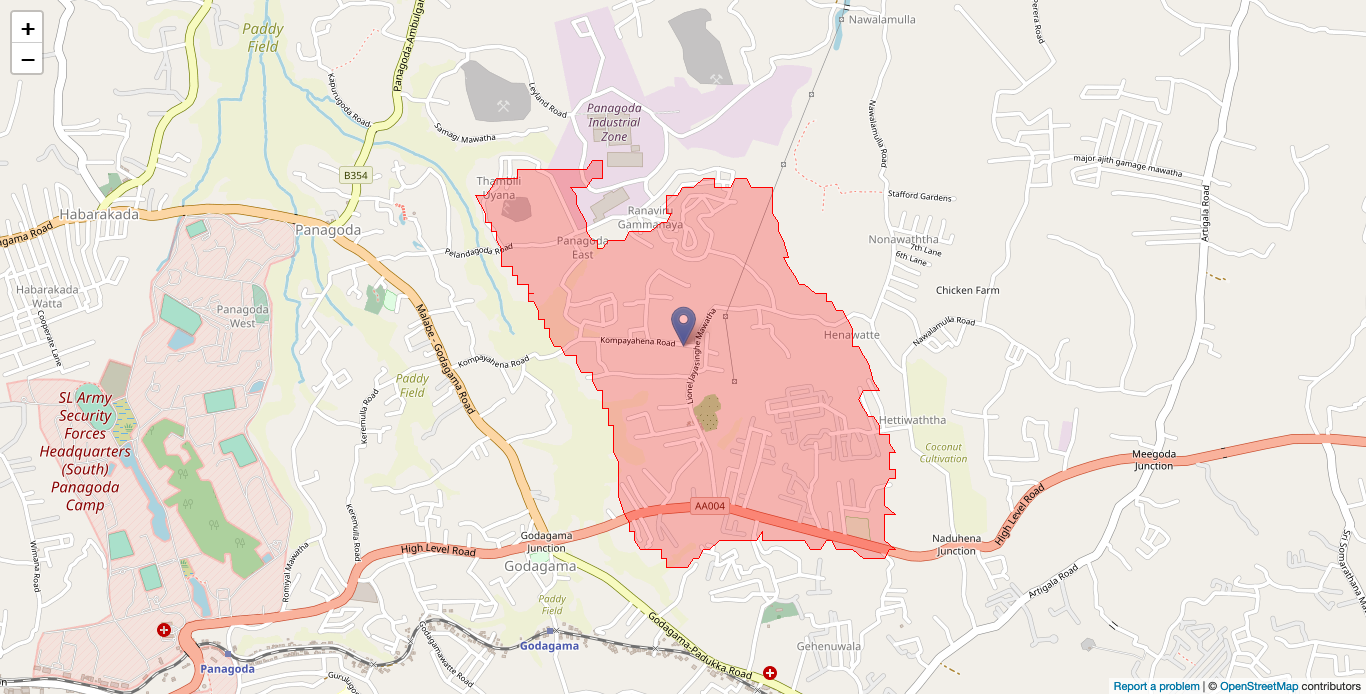
- Henawatta Grama Niladhari Division
- Coordinates: 6.860023°N 80.038525°E
- Country: Sri Lanka
- Province: Western Province
- District: Colombo District
- Divisional Secretariat: Homagama Divisional Secretariat
- Electoral District: Colombo Electoral District
- Polling Division: Homagama Polling Division

Area
  - Total: 2.53 km^{2} (0.98 sq mi)
- Elevation: 28 m (92 ft)

Population (2012)
  - Total: 6,703
  - Density: 2,649/km^{2} (6,860/sq mi)
- ISO 3166 code: LK-1112070

Henawatta Grama Niladhari Division is a Grama Niladhari Division of the Homagama Divisional Secretariat of Colombo District of Western Province, Sri Lanka . It has Grama Niladhari Division Code 482C.

Henawatta is a surrounded by the Gehenuwala, Godagama North, Nawalamulla, Meegoda South, Kurunduwatta, Panagoda Town and Meegasmulla Grama Niladhari Divisions.

== Demographics ==
=== Ethnicity ===
The Henawatta Grama Niladhari Division has a Sinhalese majority (97.8%) . In comparison, the Homagama Divisional Secretariat (which contains the Henawatta Grama Niladhari Division) has a Sinhalese majority (98.1%)

Ethnicity in Henawatta
1. Sinhalese (97.8%)
2. Sri Lankan Tamil (1.50%)
3. Other (0.70%)

=== Religion ===
The Henawatta Grama Niladhari Division has a Buddhist majority (96.0%) . In comparison, the Homagama Divisional Secretariat (which contains the Henawatta Grama Niladhari Division) has a Buddhist majority (96.2%)

Religion in Henawatta
1. Buddhist (96.0%)
2. Other Christian (1.50%)
3. Roman Catholic (1.40%)
4. Other (1.10%)
