= Homagama North Grama Niladhari Division =

Homagama North
- Grama Niladhari Division
- Interactive map of Homagama North
- Coordinates: 6.856723°N 80.008214°E
- Country: Sri Lanka
- Province: Western Province
- District: Colombo District
- Divisional Secretariat: Homagama Divisional Secretariat
- Electoral District: Colombo Electoral District
- Polling Division: Homagama Polling Division

Area
  - Total: 0.84 km^{2} (0.32 sq mi)
- Elevation: 30 m (98 ft)

Population (2012)
  - Total: 1,800
  - Density: 2,143/km^{2} (5,550/sq mi)
- ISO 3166 code: LK-1112115

Homagama North

Homagama North Grama Niladhari Division is a Grama Niladhari Division of the Homagama Divisional Secretariat of Colombo District of Western Province, Sri Lanka . It has Grama Niladhari Division Code 486.

Homagama North is a surrounded by the Athurugiriya South, Homagama West, Habarakada Watta, Homagama East and Panagoda East Grama Niladhari Divisions.

== Demographics ==
=== Ethnicity ===
The Homagama North Grama Niladhari Division has a Sinhalese majority (98.6%) . In comparison, the Homagama Divisional Secretariat (which contains the Homagama North Grama Niladhari Division) has a Sinhalese majority (98.1%)

Ethnicity in Homagama North
1. Sinhalese (98.6%)
2. Other (1.40%)

=== Religion ===
The Homagama North Grama Niladhari Division has a Buddhist majority (97.3%) . In comparison, the Homagama Divisional Secretariat (which contains the Homagama North Grama Niladhari Division) has a Buddhist majority (96.2%)

Religion in Homagama North
1. Buddhist (97.3%)
2. Other (1.40%)
3. Roman Catholic (1.30%)
