= Madinnagoda Grama Niladhari Division =

Madinnagoda
- Grama Niladhari Division
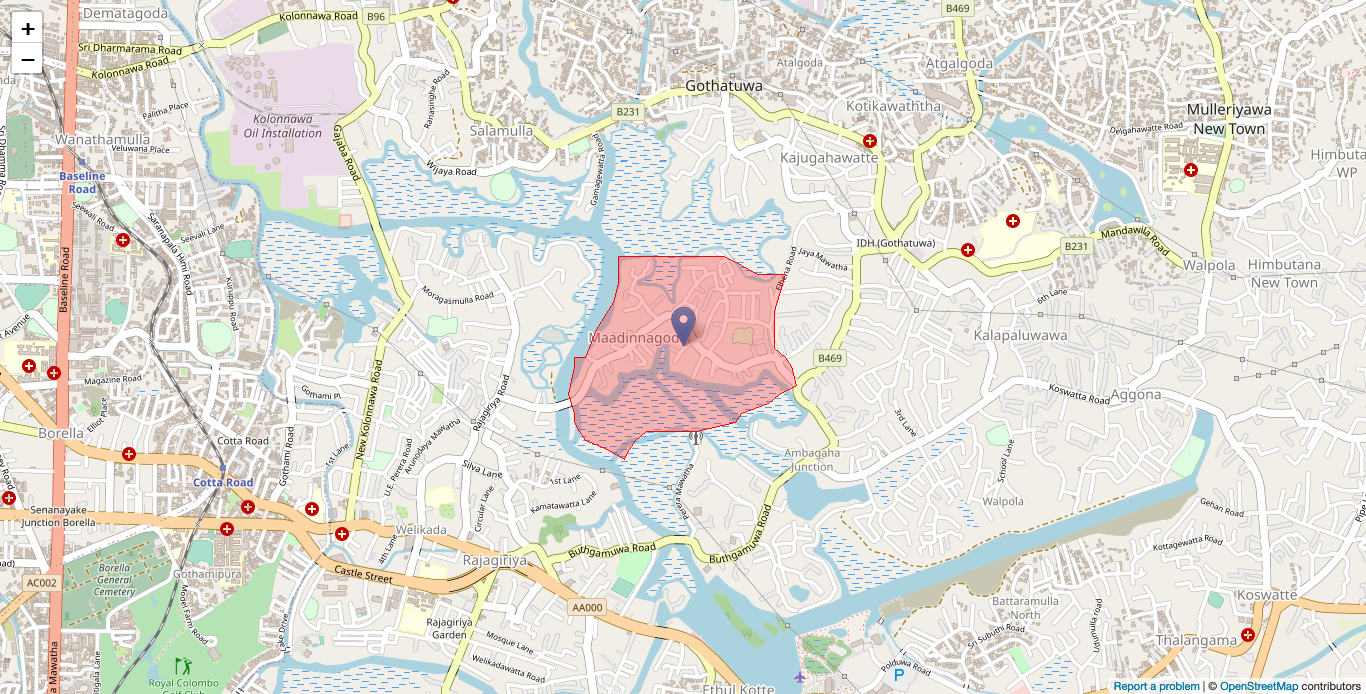
- Madinnagoda Grama Niladhari Division
- Coordinates: 6.918489°N 79.904278°E
- Country: Sri Lanka
- Province: Western Province
- District: Colombo District
- Divisional Secretariat: Kolonnawa Divisional Secretariat
- Electoral District: Colombo Electoral District
- Polling Division: Kolonnawa Polling Division

Area
  - Total: 0.76 km^{2} (0.29 sq mi)
- Elevation: 18 m (59 ft)

Population (2012)
  - Total: 3,761
  - Density: 4,949/km^{2} (12,820/sq mi)
- ISO 3166 code: LK-1106220

Madinnagoda Grama Niladhari Division is a Grama Niladhari Division of the Kolonnawa Divisional Secretariat of Colombo District of Western Province, Sri Lanka . It has Grama Niladhari Division Code 513B.

Madinnagoda is a surrounded by the Kotuwegoda, Elhena, Kalapaluwawa, Gothatuwa and Welikada East Grama Niladhari Divisions.

== Demographics ==
=== Ethnicity ===
The Madinnagoda Grama Niladhari Division has a Sinhalese majority (95.2%) . In comparison, the Kolonnawa Divisional Secretariat (which contains the Madinnagoda Grama Niladhari Division) has a Sinhalese majority (67.4%) and a significant Moor population (21.4%)

Ethnicity in Madinnagoda
1. Sinhalese (95.2%)
2. Sri Lankan Tamil (3.00%)
3. Other (1.90%)

=== Religion ===
The Madinnagoda Grama Niladhari Division has a Buddhist majority (90.6%) . In comparison, the Kolonnawa Divisional Secretariat (which contains the Madinnagoda Grama Niladhari Division) has a Buddhist majority (64.6%) and a significant Muslim population (23.1%)

Religion in Madinnagoda
1. Buddhist (90.6%)
2. Roman Catholic (4.00%)
3. Hindu (2.50%)
4. Other Christian (1.50%)
5. Muslim (1.40%)
6. Other (0.00%)
