= Wijayapura (Kolonnawa) Grama Niladhari Division =

Wijayapura
- Grama Niladhari Division
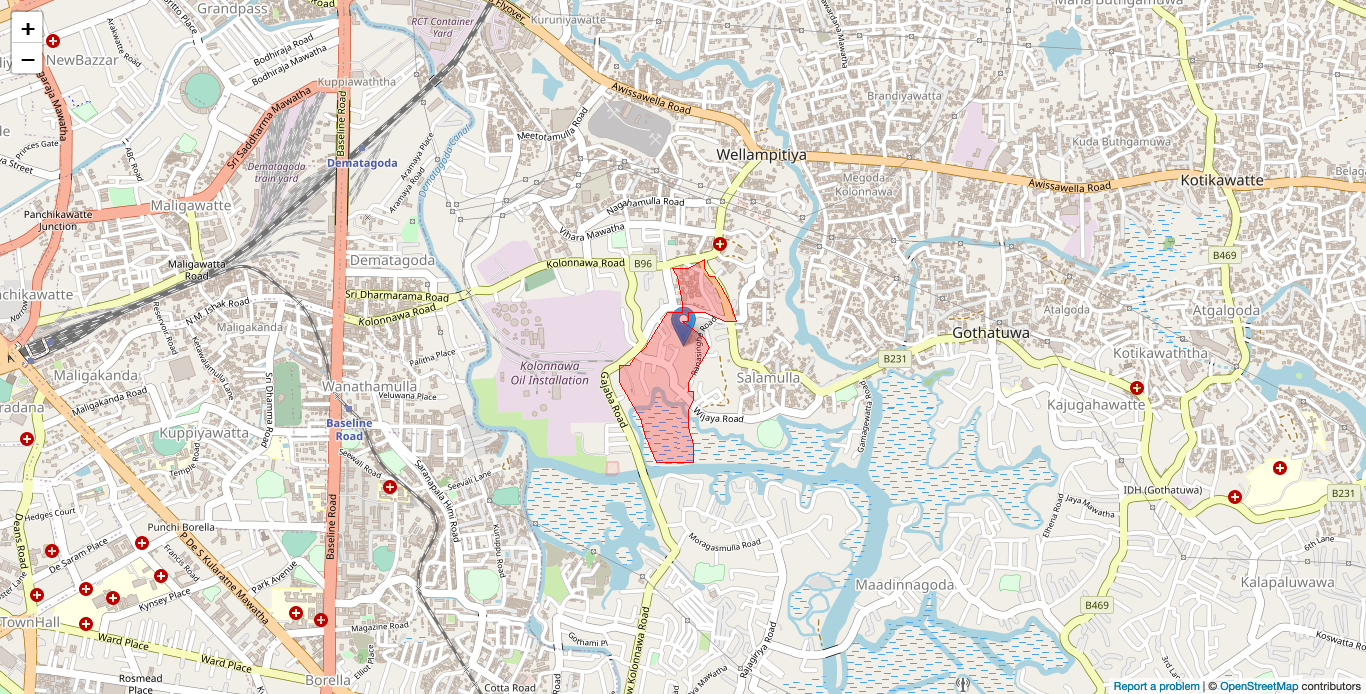
- Wijayapura Grama Niladhari Division
- Interactive map of Wijayapura
- Coordinates: 6.929035°N 79.892836°E
- Country: Sri Lanka
- Province: Western Province
- District: Colombo District
- Divisional Secretariat: Kolonnawa Divisional Secretariat
- Electoral District: Colombo Electoral District
- Polling Division: Kolonnawa Polling Division

Area
  - Total: 0.26 km^{2} (0.10 sq mi)
- Elevation: 8 m (26 ft)

Population (2012)
  - Total: 3,173
  - Density: 12,204/km^{2} (31,610/sq mi)
- ISO 3166 code: LK-1106210

Wijayapura Grama Niladhari Division is a Grama Niladhari Division of the Kolonnawa Divisional Secretariat of Colombo District of Western Province, Sri Lanka . It has Grama Niladhari Division Code 512D.

Kolonnawa and 2017 Meethotamulla landslide are located within, nearby or associated with Wijayapura.

Wijayapura is a surrounded by the Gajabapura, Kolonnawa, Salamulla, Singhapura and Welikada West Grama Niladhari Divisions.

== Demographics ==
=== Ethnicity ===
The Wijayapura Grama Niladhari Division has a Sinhalese majority (52.4%) and a significant Moor population (41.7%) . In comparison, the Kolonnawa Divisional Secretariat (which contains the Wijayapura Grama Niladhari Division) has a Sinhalese majority (67.4%) and a significant Moor population (21.4%)

Ethnicity in Wijayapura
1. Sinhalese (52.4%)
2. Moor (41.7%)
3. Malay (3.70%)
4. Other (1.20%)
5. Sri Lankan Tamil (1.00%)

=== Religion ===
The Wijayapura Grama Niladhari Division has a Buddhist majority (51.0%) and a significant Muslim population (46.3%) . In comparison, the Kolonnawa Divisional Secretariat (which contains the Wijayapura Grama Niladhari Division) has a Buddhist majority (64.6%) and a significant Muslim population (23.1%)

Religion in Wijayapura
1. Buddhist (51.0%)
2. Muslim (46.3%)
3. Roman Catholic (1.50%)
4. Other (1.20%)
