= Belagama Grama Niladhari Division =

Belagama
- Grama Niladhari Division
- Interactive map of Belagama
- Coordinates: 6.935422°N 79.922648°E
- Country: Sri Lanka
- Province: Western Province
- District: Colombo District
- Divisional Secretariat: Kolonnawa Divisional Secretariat
- Electoral District: Colombo Electoral District
- Polling Division: Kolonnawa Polling Division

Area
  - Total: 0.51 km^{2} (0.20 sq mi)
- Elevation: 11 m (36 ft)

Population (2012)
  - Total: 3,283
  - Density: 6,437/km^{2} (16,670/sq mi)
- ISO 3166 code: LK-1106080

Belagama

Belagama Grama Niladhari Division is a Grama Niladhari Division of the Kolonnawa Divisional Secretariat of Colombo District of Western Province, Sri Lanka . It has Grama Niladhari Division Code 504A.

Kotikawatta are located within, nearby or associated with Belagama.

Belagama is a surrounded by the Kuda Buthgamuwa, Mulleriyawa North, Mulleriyawa South, Malpura, Kotikawatta West, Kotikawatta East and Kelanimulla Grama Niladhari Divisions.

== Demographics ==
=== Ethnicity ===
The Belagama Grama Niladhari Division has a Sinhalese majority (91.4%) . In comparison, the Kolonnawa Divisional Secretariat (which contains the Belagama Grama Niladhari Division) has a Sinhalese majority (67.4%) and a significant Moor population (21.4%)

Ethnicity in Belagama
1. Sinhalese (91.4%)
2. Malay (2.80%)
3. Moor (2.50%)
4. Sri Lankan Tamil (2.30%)
5. Other (1.00%)

=== Religion ===
The Belagama Grama Niladhari Division has a Buddhist majority (88.7%) . In comparison, the Kolonnawa Divisional Secretariat (which contains the Belagama Grama Niladhari Division) has a Buddhist majority (64.6%) and a significant Muslim population (23.1%)

Religion in Belagama
1. Buddhist (88.7%)
2. Muslim (5.70%)
3. Roman Catholic (3.10%)
4. Hindu (1.40%)
5. Other Christian (1.10%)
6. Other (0.00%)
