= Mulleriyawa South Grama Niladhari Division =

Mulleriyawa South
- Grama Niladhari Division
- Interactive map of Mulleriyawa South
- Coordinates: 6.930391°N 79.929355°E
- Country: Sri Lanka
- Province: Western Province
- District: Colombo District
- Divisional Secretariat: Kolonnawa Divisional Secretariat
- Electoral District: Colombo Electoral District
- Polling Division: Kolonnawa Polling Division

Area
  - Total: 0.83 km^{2} (0.32 sq mi)
- Elevation: 10 m (33 ft)

Population (2012)
  - Total: 4,935
  - Density: 5,946/km^{2} (15,400/sq mi)
- ISO 3166 code: LK-1106145

Mulleriyawa South

Mulleriyawa South Grama Niladhari Division is a Grama Niladhari Division of the Kolonnawa Divisional Secretariat of Colombo District of Western Province, Sri Lanka . It has Grama Niladhari Division Code 503A.

Mulleriyawa are located within, nearby or associated with Mulleriyawa South.

Mulleriyawa South is a surrounded by the Belagama, Mulleriyawa North, Himbutana West, Malgama and Malpura Grama Niladhari Divisions.

== Demographics ==
=== Ethnicity ===
The Mulleriyawa South Grama Niladhari Division has a Sinhalese majority (96.4%) . In comparison, the Kolonnawa Divisional Secretariat (which contains the Mulleriyawa South Grama Niladhari Division) has a Sinhalese majority (67.4%) and a significant Moor population (21.4%)

Ethnicity in Mulleriyawa South
1. Sinhalese (96.4%)
2. Other (2.00%)
3. Sri Lankan Tamil (1.60%)

=== Religion ===
The Mulleriyawa South Grama Niladhari Division has a Buddhist majority (93.8%) . In comparison, the Kolonnawa Divisional Secretariat (which contains the Mulleriyawa South Grama Niladhari Division) has a Buddhist majority (64.6%) and a significant Muslim population (23.1%)

Religion in Mulleriyawa South
1. Buddhist (93.8%)
2. Roman Catholic (2.80%)
3. Hindu (1.50%)
4. Muslim (1.20%)
5. Other (0.80%)

== Gallery ==
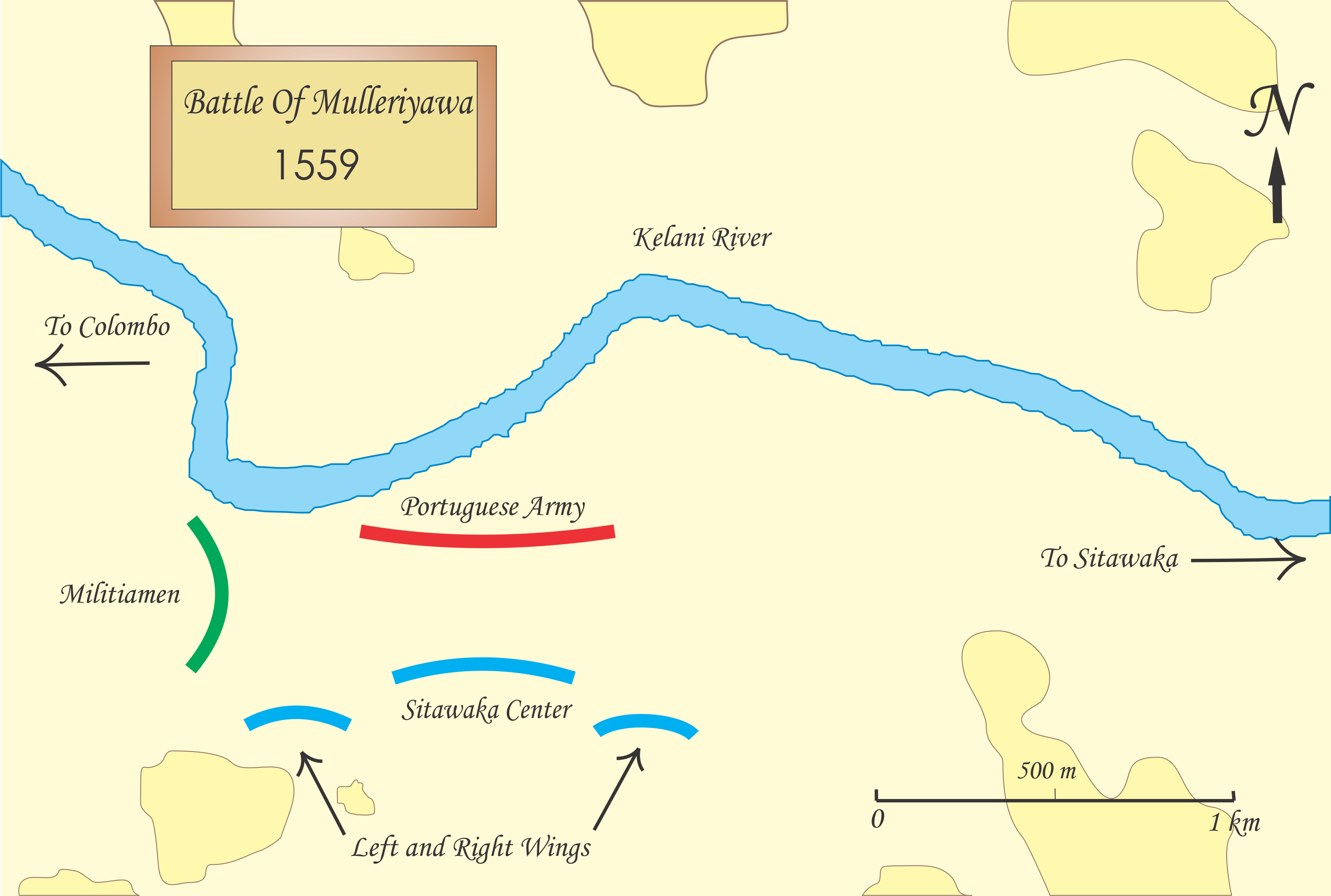
Mulleriyawa
