= Kiriberiyakele Grama Niladhari Division =

Kiriberiyakele
- Grama Niladhari Division
- Interactive map of Kiriberiyakele
- Coordinates: 6.838543°N 80.025082°E
- Country: Sri Lanka
- Province: Western Province
- District: Colombo District
- Divisional Secretariat: Homagama Divisional Secretariat
- Electoral District: Colombo Electoral District
- Polling Division: Homagama Polling Division

Area
  - Total: 1.46 km^{2} (0.56 sq mi)
- Elevation: 27 m (89 ft)

Population (2012)
  - Total: 3,332
  - Density: 2,282/km^{2} (5,910/sq mi)
- ISO 3166 code: LK-1112180

Kiriberiyakele

Kiriberiyakele Grama Niladhari Division is a Grama Niladhari Division of the Homagama Divisional Secretariat of Colombo District of Western Province, Sri Lanka . It has Grama Niladhari Division Code 484F.

Kiriberiyakele is a surrounded by the Godagama South, Kandanawatta, Pitipana North, Prasannapura, Mawathgama and Pitipana Town Grama Niladhari Divisions.

== Demographics ==
=== Ethnicity ===
The Kiriberiyakele Grama Niladhari Division has a Sinhalese majority (98.7%) . In comparison, the Homagama Divisional Secretariat (which contains the Kiriberiyakele Grama Niladhari Division) has a Sinhalese majority (98.1%)

Ethnicity in Kiriberiyakele
1. Sinhalese (98.7%)
2. Other (1.30%)

=== Religion ===
The Kiriberiyakele Grama Niladhari Division has a Buddhist majority (97.3%) . In comparison, the Homagama Divisional Secretariat (which contains the Kiriberiyakele Grama Niladhari Division) has a Buddhist majority (96.2%)

Religion in Kiriberiyakele
1. Buddhist (97.3%)
2. Roman Catholic (1.60%)
3. Other (1.10%)
