= Brahmanagama Grama Niladhari Division =

Brahmanagama
- Grama Niladhari Division
- Interactive map of Brahmanagama
- Coordinates: 6.822078°N 79.983232°E
- Country: Sri Lanka
- Province: Western Province
- District: Colombo District
- Divisional Secretariat: Homagama Divisional Secretariat
- Electoral District: Colombo Electoral District
- Polling Division: Homagama Polling Division

Area
  - Total: 2.05 km^{2} (0.79 sq mi)
- Elevation: 13 m (43 ft)

Population (2012)
  - Total: 4,655
  - Density: 2,271/km^{2} (5,880/sq mi)
- ISO 3166 code: LK-1112245

Brahmanagama

Brahmanagama Grama Niladhari Division is a Grama Niladhari Division of the Homagama Divisional Secretariat of Colombo District of Western Province, Sri Lanka . It has Grama Niladhari Division Code 500.

Brahmanagama is a surrounded by the Mattegoda East, Deepangoda, Niyandagala, Magammana West and Mambulgoda Grama Niladhari Divisions.

== Demographics ==
=== Ethnicity ===
The Brahmanagama Grama Niladhari Division has a Sinhalese majority (98.1%) . In comparison, the Homagama Divisional Secretariat (which contains the Brahmanagama Grama Niladhari Division) has a Sinhalese majority (98.1%)

Ethnicity in Brahmanagama
1. Sinhalese (98.1%)
2. Sri Lankan Tamil (1.10%)
3. Other (0.90%)

=== Religion ===
The Brahmanagama Grama Niladhari Division has a Buddhist majority (95.8%) . In comparison, the Homagama Divisional Secretariat (which contains the Brahmanagama Grama Niladhari Division) has a Buddhist majority (96.2%)

Religion in Brahmanagama
1. Buddhist (95.8%)
2. Other Christian (1.60%)
3. Roman Catholic (1.40%)
4. Hindu (1.10%)
5. Other (0.10%)
