= Siddamulla South Grama Niladhari Division =

Siddamulla South
- Grama Niladhari Division
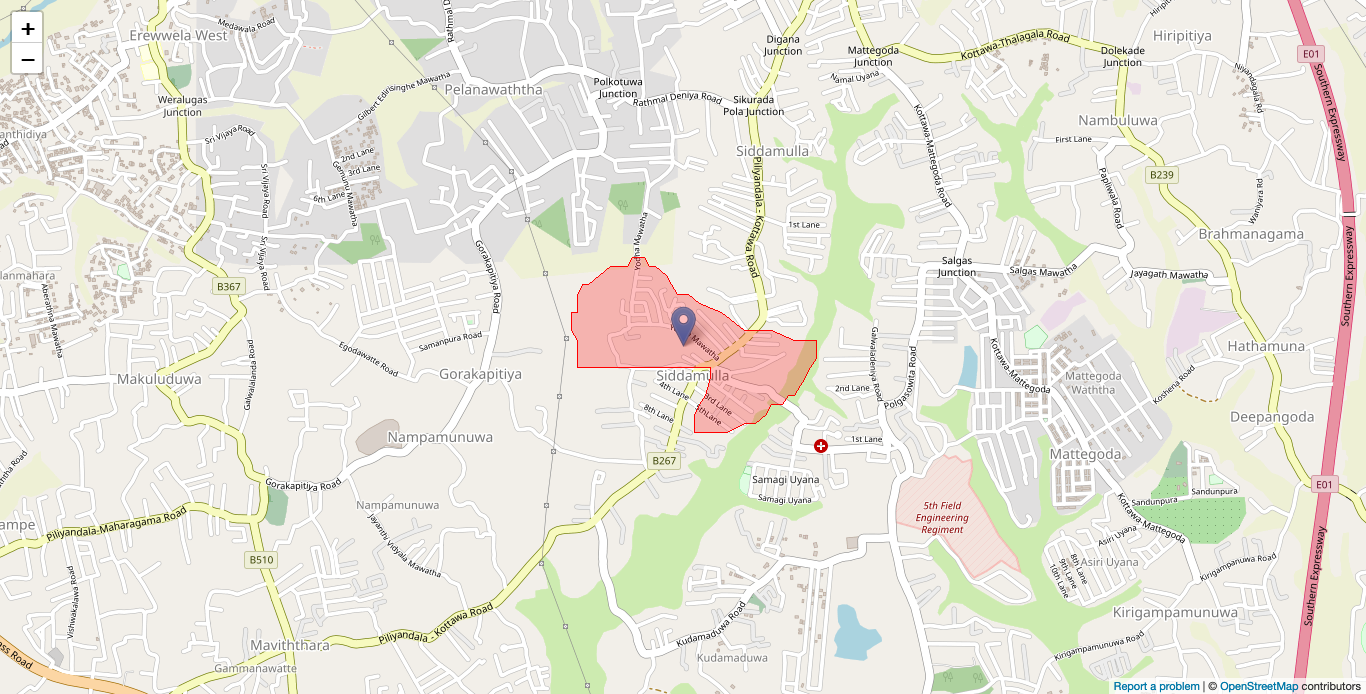
- Siddamulla South Grama Niladhari Division
- Coordinates: 6.816679°N 79.957424°E
- Country: Sri Lanka
- Province: Western Province
- District: Colombo District
- Divisional Secretariat: Homagama Divisional Secretariat
- Electoral District: Colombo Electoral District
- Polling Division: Homagama Polling Division

Area
  - Total: 0.5 km^{2} (0.19 sq mi)
- Elevation: 34 m (112 ft)

Population (2012)
  - Total: 2,452
  - Density: 4,904/km^{2} (12,700/sq mi)
- ISO 3166 code: LK-1112225

Siddamulla South Grama Niladhari Division is a Grama Niladhari Division of the Homagama Divisional Secretariat of Colombo District of Western Province, Sri Lanka. It has Grama Niladhari Division Code 591B.

Siddamulla South is surrounded by the Sangharama, Siddamulla North, Pelenwatta East, Mattegoda West, Gorakapitiya and Pelenwatta North Grama Niladhari Divisions.

== Demographics ==
=== Ethnicity ===
The Siddamulla South Grama Niladhari Division has a Sinhalese majority (98.9%) . In comparison, the Homagama Divisional Secretariat (which contains the Siddamulla South Grama Niladhari Division) has a Sinhalese majority (98.1%)

Ethnicity in Siddamulla South
1. Sinhalese (98.9%)
2. Other (1.10%)

=== Religion ===
The Siddamulla South Grama Niladhari Division has a Buddhist majority (95.6%) . In comparison, the Homagama Divisional Secretariat (which contains the Siddamulla South Grama Niladhari Division) has a Buddhist majority (96.2%)

Religion in Siddamulla South
1. Buddhist (95.6%)
2. Roman Catholic (1.90%)
3. Other Christian (1.50%)
4. Other (0.90%)
