= Mambulgoda Grama Niladhari Division =

Mambulgoda
- Grama Niladhari Division
- Interactive map of Mambulgoda
- Coordinates: 6.826873°N 79.979946°E
- Country: Sri Lanka
- Province: Western Province
- District: Colombo District
- Divisional Secretariat: Homagama Divisional Secretariat
- Electoral District: Colombo Electoral District
- Polling Division: Homagama Polling Division

Area
  - Total: 0.9 km^{2} (0.35 sq mi)
- Elevation: 27 m (89 ft)

Population (2012)
  - Total: 2,983
  - Density: 3,314/km^{2} (8,580/sq mi)
- ISO 3166 code: LK-1112210

Mambulgoda

Mambulgoda Grama Niladhari Division is a Grama Niladhari Division of the Homagama Divisional Secretariat of Colombo District of Western Province, Sri Lanka . It has Grama Niladhari Division Code 500A.

Mambulgoda is a surrounded by the Mattegoda East, Brahmanagama, Hiripitiya, Niyandagala and Kithulhena Grama Niladhari Divisions.

== Demographics ==
=== Ethnicity ===
The Mambulgoda Grama Niladhari Division has a Sinhalese majority (97.5%) . In comparison, the Homagama Divisional Secretariat (which contains the Mambulgoda Grama Niladhari Division) has a Sinhalese majority (98.1%)

Ethnicity in Mambulgoda
1. Sinhalese (97.5%)
2. Other (1.50%)
3. Sri Lankan Tamil (1.00%)

=== Religion ===
The Mambulgoda Grama Niladhari Division has a Buddhist majority (95.7%) . In comparison, the Homagama Divisional Secretariat (which contains the Mambulgoda Grama Niladhari Division) has a Buddhist majority (96.2%)

Religion in Mambulgoda
1. Buddhist (95.7%)
2. Hindu (1.70%)
3. Other (1.60%)
4. Roman Catholic (1.00%)
