= Rilawala Grama Niladhari Division =

Rilawala
- Grama Niladhari Division
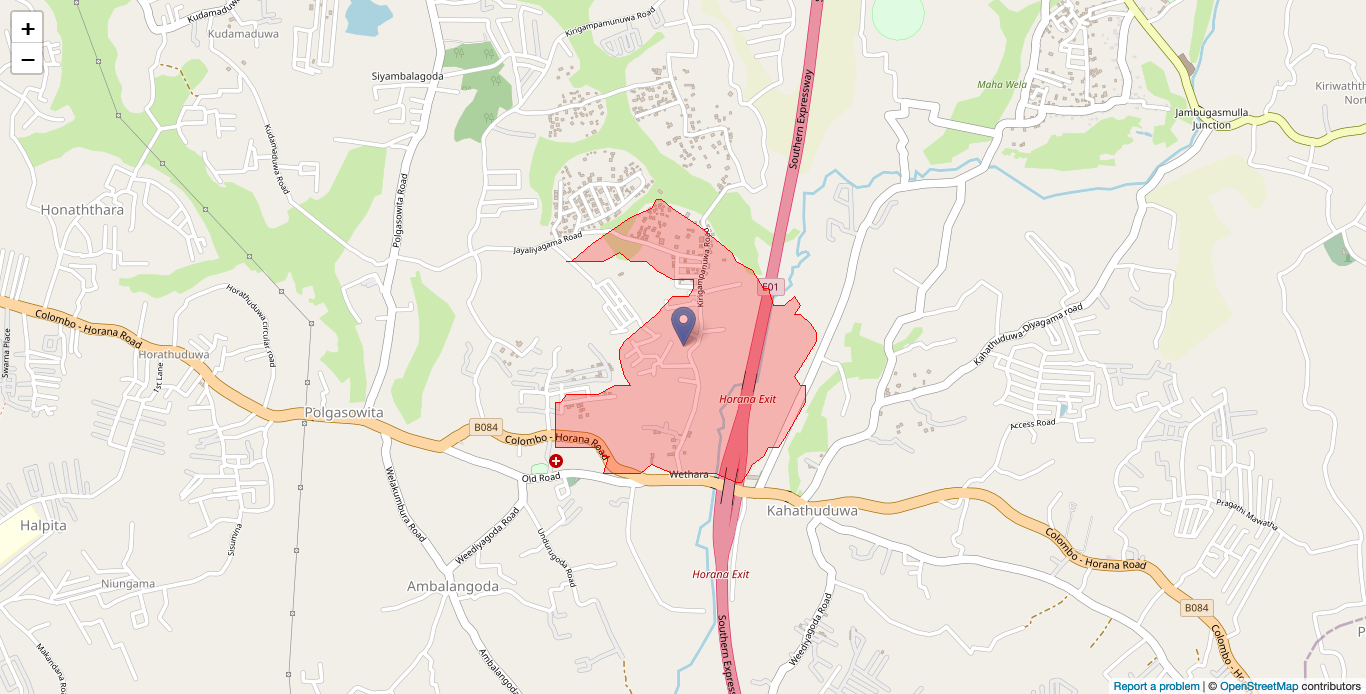
- Rilawala Grama Niladhari Division
- Coordinates: 6.790069°N 79.978388°E
- Country: Sri Lanka
- Province: Western Province
- District: Colombo District
- Divisional Secretariat: Homagama Divisional Secretariat
- Electoral District: Colombo Electoral District
- Polling Division: Homagama Polling Division

Area
  - Total: 1.07 km^{2} (0.41 sq mi)
- Elevation: 10 m (33 ft)

Population (2012)
  - Total: 1,695
  - Density: 1,584/km^{2} (4,100/sq mi)
- ISO 3166 code: LK-1112335

Rilawala Grama Niladhari Division is a Grama Niladhari Division of the Homagama Divisional Secretariat of Colombo District of Western Province, Sri Lanka . It has Grama Niladhari Division Code 593A.

Polgasowita and Kahathuduwa are located within, nearby or associated with Rilawala.

Rilawala is a surrounded by the Kahathuduwa West, Kirigampamunuwa, Siyambalagoda South, Wethara, Undurugoda and Siyambalagoda North Grama Niladhari Divisions.

== Demographics ==
=== Ethnicity ===
The Rilawala Grama Niladhari Division has a Sinhalese majority (99.4%) . In comparison, the Homagama Divisional Secretariat (which contains the Rilawala Grama Niladhari Division) has a Sinhalese majority (98.1%)

Ethnicity in Rilawala
1. Sinhalese (99.4%)
2. Other (0.60%)

=== Religion ===
The Rilawala Grama Niladhari Division has a Buddhist majority (98.4%) . In comparison, the Homagama Divisional Secretariat (which contains the Rilawala Grama Niladhari Division) has a Buddhist majority (96.2%)

Religion in Rilawala
1. Buddhist (98.4%)
2. Other (1.60%)
