= Siyambalagoda South Grama Niladhari Division =

Siyambalagoda South
- Grama Niladhari Division
- Interactive map of Siyambalagoda South
- Coordinates: 6.789670°N 79.969283°E
- Country: Sri Lanka
- Province: Western Province
- District: Colombo District
- Divisional Secretariat: Homagama Divisional Secretariat
- Electoral District: Colombo Electoral District
- Polling Division: Homagama Polling Division

Area
  - Total: 1.17 km^{2} (0.45 sq mi)
- Elevation: 25 m (82 ft)

Population (2012)
  - Total: 1,843
  - Density: 1,575/km^{2} (4,080/sq mi)
- ISO 3166 code: LK-1112330

Siyambalagoda South

Siyambalagoda South Grama Niladhari Division is a Grama Niladhari Division of the Homagama Divisional Secretariat of Colombo District of Western Province, Sri Lanka . It has Grama Niladhari Division Code 592A.

Siyambalagoda South is a surrounded by the Ambalangoda, Horathuduwa, Kudamaduwa, Rilawala, Wethara, Halpita and Siyambalagoda North Grama Niladhari Divisions.

== Demographics ==
=== Ethnicity ===
The Siyambalagoda South Grama Niladhari Division has a Sinhalese majority (98.6%) . In comparison, the Homagama Divisional Secretariat (which contains the Siyambalagoda South Grama Niladhari Division) has a Sinhalese majority (98.1%)

Ethnicity in Siyambalagoda South
1. Sinhalese (98.6%)
2. Sri Lankan Tamil (1.40%)
3. Other (0.00%)

=== Religion ===
The Siyambalagoda South Grama Niladhari Division has a Buddhist majority (96.7%) . In comparison, the Homagama Divisional Secretariat (which contains the Siyambalagoda South Grama Niladhari Division) has a Buddhist majority (96.2%)

Religion in Siyambalagoda South
1. Buddhist (96.7%)
2. Other Christian (1.40%)
3. Roman Catholic (1.00%)
4. Other (0.90%)
