= Kirigampamunuwa Grama Niladhari Division =

Kirigampamunuwa
- Grama Niladhari Division
- Interactive map of Kirigampamunuwa
- Coordinates: 6.802327°N 79.980260°E
- Country: Sri Lanka
- Province: Western Province
- District: Colombo District
- Divisional Secretariat: Homagama Divisional Secretariat
- Electoral District: Colombo Electoral District
- Polling Division: Homagama Polling Division

Area
  - Total: 1.98 km^{2} (0.76 sq mi)
- Elevation: 15 m (49 ft)

Population (2012)
  - Total: 3,189
  - Density: 1,611/km^{2} (4,170/sq mi)
- ISO 3166 code: LK-1112305

Kirigampamunuwa

Kirigampamunuwa Grama Niladhari Division is a Grama Niladhari Division of the Homagama Divisional Secretariat of Colombo District of Western Province, Sri Lanka . It has Grama Niladhari Division Code 588.

Kirigampamunuwa is a surrounded by the Mattegoda Central 'B', Mattegoda East, Deepangoda, Diyagama West, Kahathuduwa West, Rilawala, Siyambalagoda North and Mattegoda West Grama Niladhari Divisions.

== Demographics ==
=== Ethnicity ===
The Kirigampamunuwa Grama Niladhari Division has a Sinhalese majority (97.9%) . In comparison, the Homagama Divisional Secretariat (which contains the Kirigampamunuwa Grama Niladhari Division) has a Sinhalese majority (98.1%)

Ethnicity in Kirigampamunuwa
1. Sinhalese (97.9%)
2. Other (2.10%)

=== Religion ===
The Kirigampamunuwa Grama Niladhari Division has a Buddhist majority (94.8%) . In comparison, the Homagama Divisional Secretariat (which contains the Kirigampamunuwa Grama Niladhari Division) has a Buddhist majority (96.2%)

Religion in Kirigampamunuwa
1. Buddhist (94.8%)
2. Roman Catholic (2.70%)
3. Other (1.40%)
4. Hindu (1.10%)
