= Kolonnawa Divisional Secretariat =

- Divisional Secretariat
- Interactive map of Kolonnawa Divisional Secretariat
- Country: Sri Lanka
- Province: Western Province
- District: Colombo District

Area
  - Total: 10.06 sq mi (26.05 km^{2})

Population (2024 census)
  - Total: 214,070
- Time zone: UTC+5:30 (Sri Lanka Standard Time)

Kolonnawa Divisional Secretariat is a Divisional Secretariat of Colombo District, of Western Province, Sri Lanka.

and it has following Grama Niladhari divisions

501 Mulleriyawa North
501 Ambathale A
502 Udumulla North
502 Udumulla South
502 Maligagodella B
502 Rajasinhagama C
503 Himbutana West
503 Mulleriyawa South A
503 Himbutana East B
503 Malgama C
504 Kelanimulla
504 Belagama A
505 Malpura A
505 Kotikawatta East
505 Gothatuwa New Town B
505 Kotikawatta West C
505 Dombagahahena D
506 Mahabuthgamuwa
506 Kudabuthgamuwa A
506 Batalandahena B
506 C Mahabuthgamuwa B
506 D Mahabuthgamuwa C
507 Vennawatta
508 Kittampahuwa
508 Welewatte A
509 Kotuvila
509 Sedawatte A
509 Weheragoda B
509 Halmulla C
509 Wadulla D
510 Meethotamulla
510 Orugodawatte A
510 Kuruniyawatte B
511 Wellampitiya
511 Dahampura A
512 Kolonnawa
512 Salamulla A
512 Sinhapura B
512 Gajabapura C
512 Vijayapura D
513 Gothatuwa
513 Megodakolonnawa A
513 Madinnagoda B
513 Kajugahawatte C
513 Bopetta D
513 Elhena E
