= Kolonnawa Polling Division =

Kolonnawa
- Polling Division
- Coordinates: 6.935782°N 79.913140°E
- Country: Sri Lanka
- Province: Western Province, Sri Lanka
- Electoral District: Colombo Electoral District

Area
  - Total: 27.89 km^{2} (10.77 sq mi)

Population (2012)
  - Total: 191,687
  - Density: 6,873/km^{2} (17,800/sq mi)
- ISO 3166 code: EC-01H

The Kolonnawa Polling Division is a Polling Division in the Colombo Electoral District, in the Western Province, Sri Lanka.

== Presidential Election Results ==
=== Summary ===
The winner of Kolonnawa has matched the final country result 6 out of 8 times. Hence, Kolonnawa is a Weak Bellwether for Presidential Elections.

| Year | Kolonnawa | Colombo Electoral District | MAE % | Sri Lanka | MAE % |
|---|---|---|---|---|---|
| 2019 | SLPP | SLPP | 4.56% | SLPP | 3.63% |
| 2015 | NDF | NDF | 2.48% | NDF | 6.84% |
| 2010 | UPFA | UPFA | 0.24% | UPFA | 4.93% |
| 2005 | UNP | UNP | 1.49% | UPFA | 0.99% |
| 1999 | PA | PA | 3.12% | PA | 1.58% |
| 1994 | PA | PA | 0.41% | PA | 2.02% |
| 1988 | SLFP | UNP | 2.46% | UNP | 3.69% |
| 1982 | UNP | UNP | 6.22% | UNP | 2.48% |
| Matches/Mean MAE | 6/8 | 7/8 | 2.62% | 8/8 | 3.27% |

=== 2019 Sri Lankan Presidential Election ===
| Party | Kolonnawa | | Colombo Electoral District | | Sri Lanka | |
| Party | Votes | % | Votes | % | Votes | % |
|---|---|---|---|---|---|---|
| SLPP | 53,232 | 48.62% | 727,713 | 53.19% | 6,924,255 | 52.25% |
| NDF | 50,456 | 46.08% | 559,921 | 40.92% | 5,564,239 | 41.99% |
| NMPP | 3,940 | 3.60% | 53,803 | 3.93% | 418,553 | 3.16% |
| Other Parties (with < 1%) | 1,867 | 1.71% | 26,740 | 1.95% | 345,452 | 2.61% |
| Valid Votes | 109,495 | 98.97% | 1,368,177 | 98.89% | 13,252,499 | 98.99% |
| Rejected Votes | 1,135 | 1.03% | 15,333 | 1.11% | 135,452 | 1.01% |
| Total Polled | 110,630 | 83.57% | 1,383,510 | 82.82% | 13,387,951 | 83.71% |
| Registered Electors | 132,381 | | 1,670,403 | | 15,992,568 | |

=== 2015 Sri Lankan Presidential Election ===
| Party | Kolonnawa | | Colombo Electoral District | | Sri Lanka | |
| Party | Votes | % | Votes | % | Votes | % |
|---|---|---|---|---|---|---|
| NDF | 56,835 | 58.39% | 725,073 | 55.93% | 6,217,162 | 51.28% |
| UPFA | 39,767 | 40.86% | 562,614 | 43.40% | 5,768,090 | 47.58% |
| Other Parties (with < 1%) | 734 | 0.75% | 8,673 | 0.67% | 138,200 | 1.14% |
| Valid Votes | 97,336 | 98.71% | 1,296,360 | 98.83% | 12,123,452 | 98.85% |
| Rejected Votes | 1,275 | 1.29% | 15,334 | 1.17% | 140,925 | 1.15% |
| Total Polled | 98,611 | 81.76% | 1,311,694 | 81.34% | 12,264,377 | 78.69% |
| Registered Electors | 120,617 | | 1,612,660 | | 15,585,942 | |

=== 2010 Sri Lankan Presidential Election ===
| Party | Kolonnawa | | Colombo Electoral District | | Sri Lanka | |
| Party | Votes | % | Votes | % | Votes | % |
|---|---|---|---|---|---|---|
| UPFA | 46,002 | 53.19% | 614,740 | 52.93% | 6,015,934 | 57.88% |
| NDF | 39,497 | 45.67% | 533,022 | 45.90% | 4,173,185 | 40.15% |
| Other Parties (with < 1%) | 987 | 1.14% | 13,620 | 1.17% | 204,494 | 1.97% |
| Valid Votes | 86,486 | 98.98% | 1,161,382 | 99.03% | 10,393,613 | 99.03% |
| Rejected Votes | 893 | 1.02% | 11,394 | 0.97% | 101,838 | 0.97% |
| Total Polled | 87,379 | 77.76% | 1,172,776 | 76.09% | 10,495,451 | 66.70% |
| Registered Electors | 112,363 | | 1,541,242 | | 15,734,587 | |

=== 2005 Sri Lankan Presidential Election ===
| Party | Kolonnawa | | Colombo Electoral District | | Sri Lanka | |
| Party | Votes | % | Votes | % | Votes | % |
|---|---|---|---|---|---|---|
| UNP | 40,744 | 49.67% | 569,627 | 51.12% | 4,706,366 | 48.43% |
| UPFA | 40,616 | 49.51% | 534,431 | 47.96% | 4,887,152 | 50.29% |
| Other Parties (with < 1%) | 668 | 0.81% | 10,192 | 0.91% | 123,521 | 1.27% |
| Valid Votes | 82,028 | 98.92% | 1,114,250 | 98.86% | 9,717,039 | 98.88% |
| Rejected Votes | 892 | 1.08% | 12,879 | 1.14% | 109,869 | 1.12% |
| Total Polled | 82,920 | 76.97% | 1,127,129 | 75.85% | 9,826,908 | 69.51% |
| Registered Electors | 107,725 | | 1,486,021 | | 14,136,979 | |

=== 1999 Sri Lankan Presidential Election ===
| Party | Kolonnawa | | Colombo Electoral District | | Sri Lanka | |
| Party | Votes | % | Votes | % | Votes | % |
|---|---|---|---|---|---|---|
| PA | 36,907 | 52.62% | 474,310 | 49.18% | 4,312,157 | 51.12% |
| UNP | 28,681 | 40.90% | 425,185 | 44.08% | 3,602,748 | 42.71% |
| JVP | 3,385 | 4.83% | 44,009 | 4.56% | 343,927 | 4.08% |
| Other Parties (with < 1%) | 1,160 | 1.65% | 21,030 | 2.18% | 176,679 | 2.09% |
| Valid Votes | 70,133 | 97.47% | 964,534 | 97.06% | 8,435,754 | 97.69% |
| Rejected Votes | 1,819 | 2.53% | 29,197 | 2.94% | 199,536 | 2.31% |
| Total Polled | 71,952 | 74.82% | 993,731 | 73.39% | 8,635,290 | 72.17% |
| Registered Electors | 96,164 | | 1,354,025 | | 11,965,536 | |

=== 1994 Sri Lankan Presidential Election ===
| Party | Kolonnawa | | Colombo Electoral District | | Sri Lanka | |
| Party | Votes | % | Votes | % | Votes | % |
|---|---|---|---|---|---|---|
| PA | 40,296 | 64.48% | 557,708 | 64.82% | 4,709,205 | 62.28% |
| UNP | 21,313 | 34.10% | 288,741 | 33.56% | 2,715,283 | 35.91% |
| Other Parties (with < 1%) | 889 | 1.42% | 13,937 | 1.62% | 137,040 | 1.81% |
| Valid Votes | 62,498 | 98.24% | 860,386 | 98.17% | 7,561,526 | 98.03% |
| Rejected Votes | 1,120 | 1.76% | 16,060 | 1.83% | 151,706 | 1.97% |
| Total Polled | 63,618 | 70.56% | 876,446 | 69.59% | 7,713,232 | 69.12% |
| Registered Electors | 90,167 | | 1,259,484 | | 11,158,880 | |

=== 1988 Sri Lankan Presidential Election ===
| Party | Kolonnawa | | Colombo Electoral District | | Sri Lanka | |
| Party | Votes | % | Votes | % | Votes | % |
|---|---|---|---|---|---|---|
| SLFP | 25,050 | 48.78% | 339,958 | 46.23% | 2,289,857 | 44.95% |
| UNP | 23,895 | 46.53% | 361,337 | 49.14% | 2,569,199 | 50.43% |
| SLMP | 2,411 | 4.69% | 34,020 | 4.63% | 235,701 | 4.63% |
| Valid Votes | 51,356 | 98.37% | 735,315 | 98.49% | 5,094,754 | 98.24% |
| Rejected Votes | 849 | 1.63% | 11,295 | 1.51% | 91,499 | 1.76% |
| Total Polled | 52,205 | 69.01% | 746,610 | 67.53% | 5,186,256 | 55.87% |
| Registered Electors | 75,650 | | 1,105,583 | | 9,283,143 | |

=== 1982 Sri Lankan Presidential Election ===
| Party | Kolonnawa | | Colombo Electoral District | | Sri Lanka | |
| Party | Votes | % | Votes | % | Votes | % |
|---|---|---|---|---|---|---|
| UNP | 25,221 | 51.35% | 436,290 | 57.86% | 3,450,815 | 52.93% |
| SLFP | 21,153 | 43.07% | 274,476 | 36.40% | 2,546,348 | 39.05% |
| JVP | 2,125 | 4.33% | 28,580 | 3.79% | 273,428 | 4.19% |
| LSSP | 504 | 1.03% | 9,655 | 1.28% | 58,531 | 0.90% |
| Other Parties (with < 1%) | 115 | 0.23% | 5,030 | 0.67% | 190,929 | 2.93% |
| Valid Votes | 49,118 | 98.90% | 754,031 | 98.95% | 6,520,156 | 98.78% |
| Rejected Votes | 545 | 1.10% | 7,990 | 1.05% | 80,470 | 1.22% |
| Total Polled | 49,663 | 79.43% | 762,021 | 76.88% | 6,600,626 | 80.15% |
| Registered Electors | 62,523 | | 991,194 | | 8,235,358 | |

== Parliamentary Election Results ==
=== Summary ===
The winner of Kolonnawa has matched the final national election result 7 out of the last 7 cycles. leading observers to consider it a Good Bellwether for Parliamentary Elections.

| Year | Kolonnawa | Colombo Electoral District | MAE % | Sri Lanka | MAE % |
|---|---|---|---|---|---|
| 2015 | UNP | UNP | 0.65% | UNP | 5.41% |
| 2010 | UPFA | UPFA | 2.01% | UPFA | 5.82% |
| 2004 | UPFA | UNP | 2.92% | UPFA | 2.33% |
| 2001 | UNP | UNP | 2.85% | UNP | 1.84% |
| 2000 | PA | UNP | 2.95% | PA | 1.29% |
| 1994 | PA | PA | 3.06% | PA | 4.89% |
| 1989 | UNP | UNP | 4.39% | UNP | 2.57% |
| Matches/Mean MAE | 7/7 | 5/7 | 2.69% | 7/7 | 3.45% |

=== 2020 Sri Lankan Parliamentary Election ===
| Party | Kolonnawa | | Colombo Electoral District | | Sri Lanka | |
| Party | Votes | % | Votes | % | Votes | % |
|---|---|---|---|---|---|---|
| SLPFA | 49,742 | 52.41% | 674,603 | 57.04% | 6,853,693 | 59.09% |
| SJB | 36,718 | 38.54% | 387,145 | 32.73% | 2,771,984 | 23.9% |
| JJB | 4,655 | 4.89% | 67,600 | 5.72% | 445,958 | 3.84% |
| UNP | 2,091 | 2.19% | 30,875 | 2.61% | 249,435 | 2.15% |
| Other Parties (with < 1%) | 2,066 | 1.97% | 22,553 | 1.9% | 1,227,859 | 11.02% |
| Valid Votes | 95,272 | 70.04% | 1,182,776 | 69.2% | 11,598,936 | 71.32% |
| Rejected Votes | 6,870 | 5.05% | 81,034 | 4.74% | 744,373 | 4.58% |
| Total Polled | 102,142 | 75.09% | 1,263,810 | 73.94% | 12,343,309 | 75.89% |
| Registered Electors | 136,028 | | 1,709,209 | | 16,263,885 | |

=== 2015 Sri Lankan Parliamentary Election ===
| Party | Kolonnawa | | Colombo Electoral District | | Sri Lanka | |
| Party | Votes | % | Votes | % | Votes | % |
|---|---|---|---|---|---|---|
| UNP | 49,196 | 53.77% | 640,743 | 53.04% | 5,098,916 | 45.77% |
| UPFA | 35,300 | 38.59% | 474,063 | 39.25% | 4,732,664 | 42.48% |
| JVP | 6,159 | 6.73% | 81,391 | 6.74% | 544,154 | 4.88% |
| Other Parties (with < 1%) | 830 | 0.91% | 11,752 | 0.97% | 93,045 | 0.84% |
| Valid Votes | 91,485 | 96.44% | 1,207,949 | 96.46% | 11,140,333 | 95.35% |
| Rejected Votes | 3,283 | 3.46% | 43,372 | 3.46% | 516,926 | 4.42% |
| Total Polled | 94,859 | 78.64% | 1,252,271 | 78.93% | 11,684,111 | 77.66% |
| Registered Electors | 120,617 | | 1,586,598 | | 15,044,490 | |

=== 2010 Sri Lankan Parliamentary Election ===
| Party | Kolonnawa | | Colombo Electoral District | | Sri Lanka | |
| Party | Votes | % | Votes | % | Votes | % |
|---|---|---|---|---|---|---|
| UPFA | 37,782 | 53.56% | 480,896 | 51.23% | 4,846,388 | 60.38% |
| UNP | 23,949 | 33.95% | 339,750 | 36.19% | 2,357,057 | 29.37% |
| DNA | 8,371 | 11.87% | 110,683 | 11.79% | 441,251 | 5.50% |
| Other Parties (with < 1%) | 446 | 0.63% | 7,292 | 0.78% | 48,240 | 0.60% |
| Valid Votes | 70,548 | 94.76% | 938,723 | 94.85% | 8,026,322 | 96.03% |
| Rejected Votes | 3,863 | 5.19% | 50,354 | 5.09% | 581,465 | 6.96% |
| Total Polled | 74,446 | 66.25% | 989,729 | 64.17% | 8,358,246 | 59.29% |
| Registered Electors | 112,363 | | 1,542,457 | | 14,097,690 | |

=== 2004 Sri Lankan Parliamentary Election ===
| Party | Kolonnawa | | Colombo Electoral District | | Sri Lanka | |
| Party | Votes | % | Votes | % | Votes | % |
|---|---|---|---|---|---|---|
| UPFA | 32,976 | 42.54% | 414,688 | 39.20% | 4,223,126 | 45.70% |
| UNP | 29,540 | 38.10% | 441,841 | 41.77% | 3,486,792 | 37.73% |
| JHU | 14,311 | 18.46% | 190,618 | 18.02% | 552,723 | 5.98% |
| Other Parties (with < 1%) | 697 | 0.90% | 10,713 | 1.01% | 90,868 | 0.98% |
| Valid Votes | 77,524 | 96.47% | 1,057,860 | 96.47% | 9,241,931 | 94.52% |
| Rejected Votes | 2,832 | 3.52% | 38,605 | 3.52% | 534,452 | 5.47% |
| Total Polled | 80,362 | 75.57% | 1,096,571 | 74.71% | 9,777,821 | 75.74% |
| Registered Electors | 106,335 | | 1,467,751 | | 12,909,631 | |

=== 2001 Sri Lankan Parliamentary Election ===
| Party | Kolonnawa | | Colombo Electoral District | | Sri Lanka | |
| Party | Votes | % | Votes | % | Votes | % |
|---|---|---|---|---|---|---|
| UNP | 37,256 | 48.76% | 546,417 | 51.62% | 4,086,026 | 45.62% |
| PA | 28,465 | 37.25% | 353,401 | 33.39% | 3,330,815 | 37.19% |
| JVP | 8,869 | 11.61% | 117,404 | 11.09% | 815,353 | 9.10% |
| SU | 1,001 | 1.31% | 16,970 | 1.60% | 50,665 | 0.57% |
| Other Parties (with < 1%) | 823 | 1.08% | 24,289 | 2.29% | 510,616 | 5.70% |
| Valid Votes | 76,414 | 96.51% | 1,058,481 | 96.28% | 8,955,844 | 94.77% |
| Rejected Votes | 2,761 | 3.49% | 40,901 | 3.72% | 494,009 | 5.23% |
| Total Polled | 79,175 | 77.11% | 1,099,382 | 76.31% | 9,449,878 | 76.03% |
| Registered Electors | 102,676 | | 1,440,682 | | 12,428,762 | |

=== 2000 Sri Lankan Parliamentary Election ===
| Party | Kolonnawa | | Colombo Electoral District | | Sri Lanka | |
| Party | Votes | % | Votes | % | Votes | % |
|---|---|---|---|---|---|---|
| PA | 32,394 | 43.86% | 394,146 | 38.86% | 3,899,329 | 45.33% |
| UNP | 30,522 | 41.32% | 440,684 | 43.45% | 3,451,765 | 40.12% |
| JVP | 5,741 | 7.77% | 78,133 | 7.70% | 518,725 | 6.03% |
| SU | 2,604 | 3.53% | 49,671 | 4.90% | 127,859 | 1.49% |
| NUA | 1,689 | 2.29% | 27,067 | 2.67% | 185,593 | 2.16% |
| Other Parties (with < 1%) | 915 | 1.24% | 24,519 | 2.42% | 189,490 | 2.20% |
| Valid Votes | 73,865 | N/A | 1,014,220 | N/A | 8,602,617 | N/A |

=== 1994 Sri Lankan Parliamentary Election ===
| Party | Kolonnawa | | Colombo Electoral District | | Sri Lanka | |
| Party | Votes | % | Votes | % | Votes | % |
|---|---|---|---|---|---|---|
| PA | 36,939 | 55.47% | 469,642 | 50.94% | 3,887,805 | 48.94% |
| UNP | 26,796 | 40.24% | 385,100 | 41.77% | 3,498,370 | 44.04% |
| MEP | 1,646 | 2.47% | 42,734 | 4.64% | 68,538 | 0.86% |
| SLPF | 935 | 1.40% | 11,454 | 1.24% | 90,078 | 1.13% |
| Other Parties (with < 1%) | 277 | 0.42% | 13,003 | 1.41% | 51,995 | 0.65% |
| Valid Votes | 66,593 | 96.00% | 921,933 | 96.18% | 7,943,688 | 95.20% |
| Rejected Votes | 2,775 | 4.00% | 36,635 | 3.82% | 400,395 | 4.80% |
| Total Polled | 69,368 | 76.93% | 958,568 | 76.04% | 8,344,095 | 74.75% |
| Registered Electors | 90,167 | | 1,260,686 | | 11,163,064 | |

=== 1989 Sri Lankan Parliamentary Election ===
| Party | Kolonnawa | | Colombo Electoral District | | Sri Lanka | |
| Party | Votes | % | Votes | % | Votes | % |
|---|---|---|---|---|---|---|
| UNP | 24,561 | 49.59% | 374,530 | 51.67% | 2,838,005 | 50.71% |
| SLFP | 18,531 | 37.41% | 205,053 | 28.29% | 1,785,369 | 31.90% |
| USA | 2,917 | 5.89% | 31,873 | 4.40% | 141,983 | 2.54% |
| MEP | 2,698 | 5.45% | 76,966 | 10.62% | 90,480 | 1.62% |
| SLMC | 662 | 1.34% | 29,308 | 4.04% | 202,016 | 3.61% |
| Other Parties (with < 1%) | 161 | 0.33% | 7,112 | 0.98% | 67,723 | 1.21% |
| Valid Votes | 49,530 | 95.24% | 724,842 | 95.36% | 5,596,468 | 93.87% |
| Rejected Votes | 2,477 | 4.76% | 35,271 | 4.64% | 365,563 | 6.13% |
| Total Polled | 52,007 | 69.65% | 760,113 | 69.87% | 5,962,031 | 63.60% |
| Registered Electors | 74,671 | | 1,087,891 | | 9,374,164 | |

== Demographics ==
=== Ethnicity ===
The Kolonnawa Polling Division has a Sinhalese majority (67.4%) and a significant Moor population (21.4%) . In comparison, the Colombo Electoral District (which contains the Kolonnawa Polling Division) has a Sinhalese majority (76.5%), a significant Moor population (10.7%) and a significant Sri Lankan Tamil population (10.1%)

Ethnicity in Kolonnawa
1. Sinhalese (67.4%)
2. Moor (21.4%)
3. Sri Lankan Tamil (8.40%)
4. Other (1.60%)
5. Malay (1.20%)

=== Religion ===
The Kolonnawa Polling Division has a Buddhist majority (64.6%) and a significant Muslim population (23.1%) . In comparison, the Colombo Electoral District (which contains the Kolonnawa Polling Division) has a Buddhist majority (70.2%) and a significant Muslim population (11.8%)

Religion in Kolonnawa
1. Buddhist (64.6%)
2. Muslim (23.1%)
3. Hindu (6.80%)
4. Roman Catholic (3.80%)
5. Other Christian (1.70%)
6. Other (0.00%)
