= Homagama Divisional Secretariat =

Coordinates: 6°50′5″N 80°1′3″E

- Divisional Secretariat
- Interactive map of Homagama Divisional Secretariat
- Country: Sri Lanka
- Province: Western Province
- District: Colombo District

Area
  - Total: 46.3 sq mi (119.9 km^{2})

Population (2024 census)
  - Total: 280,771
- Time zone: UTC+5:30 (Sri Lanka Standard Time)
- Postal code: 10200

Homagama Divisional Secretariat is a Divisional Secretariat of Colombo District, of Western Province, Sri Lanka.

== Demography ==
Religion in Homagama DS Division (2024)
1. Buddhist (96.5%)
2. Hindu (1.00%)
3. Muslim (0.60%)
4. Roman Catholic (1.30%)
5. Other Christian (0.60%)
6. Other (0.00%)

== List of divisions ==
- Rilawala Grama Niladhari Division
- Siyambalagoda South Grama Niladhari Division
- Kirigampamunuwa Grama Niladhari Division
