= Homagama Polling Division =

Homagama
- Polling Division
- Coordinates: 6.835433°N 80.018861°E
- Country: Sri Lanka
- Province: Western Province, Sri Lanka
- Electoral District: Colombo Electoral District

Area
  - Total: 124.84 km^{2} (48.20 sq mi)

Population (2012)
  - Total: 237,905
  - Density: 1,906/km^{2} (4,940/sq mi)
- ISO 3166 code: EC-01L

The Homagama Polling Division is a Polling Division in the Colombo Electoral District, in the Western Province, Sri Lanka.

== Presidential Election Results ==
=== Summary ===
The winner of Homagama has matched the final country result 6 out of 8 times. Hence, Homagama is a Weak Bellwether for Presidential Elections.

Year	Homagama	Colombo Electoral District	MAE %	Sri Lanka	MAE %
2019	SLPP	SLPP	14.07%	SLPP	15.05%
2015	UPFA	NDF	11.07%	NDF	6.65%
2010	UPFA	UPFA	13.40%	UPFA	8.13%
2005	UPFA	UNP	11.10%	UPFA	8.59%
1999	PA	PA	6.51%	PA	4.97%
1994	PA	PA	0.88%	PA	3.31%
1988	SLFP	UNP	7.86%	UNP	9.07%
1982	UNP	UNP	5.88%	UNP	2.17%
Matches/Mean MAE	6/8	7/8	8.85%	8/8	7.24%

=== 2019 Sri Lankan Presidential Election ===
Party	Homagama		Colombo Electoral District		Sri Lanka	
Party	Votes	%	Votes	%	Votes	%
SLPP	106,102	67.84%	727,713	53.19%	6,924,255	52.25%
NDF	40,157	25.68%	559,921	40.92%	5,564,239	41.99%
NMPP	7,596	4.86%	53,803	3.93%	418,553	3.16%
Other Parties (with < 1%)	2,545	1.63%	26,740	1.95%	345,452	2.61%
Valid Votes	156,400	99.17%	1,368,177	98.89%	13,252,499	98.99%
Rejected Votes	1,314	0.83%	15,333	1.11%	135,452	1.01%
Total Polled	157,714	84.68%	1,383,510	82.82%	13,387,951	83.71%
Registered Electors	186,252		1,670,403		15,992,568	

=== 2015 Sri Lankan Presidential Election ===
Party	Homagama		Colombo Electoral District		Sri Lanka	
Party	Votes	%	Votes	%	Votes	%
UPFA	77,415	54.61%	562,614	43.40%	5,768,090	47.58%
NDF	63,563	44.84%	725,073	55.93%	6,217,162	51.28%
Other Parties (with < 1%)	784	0.55%	8,673	0.67%	138,200	1.14%
Valid Votes	141,762	98.97%	1,296,360	98.83%	12,123,452	98.85%
Rejected Votes	1,481	1.03%	15,334	1.17%	140,925	1.15%
Total Polled	143,243	81.90%	1,311,694	81.34%	12,264,377	78.69%
Registered Electors	174,909		1,612,660		15,585,942	

=== 2010 Sri Lankan Presidential Election ===
Party	Homagama		Colombo Electoral District		Sri Lanka	
Party	Votes	%	Votes	%	Votes	%
UPFA	80,799	66.62%	614,740	52.93%	6,015,934	57.88%
NDF	39,414	32.50%	533,022	45.90%	4,173,185	40.15%
Other Parties (with < 1%)	1,066	0.88%	13,620	1.17%	204,494	1.97%
Valid Votes	121,279	99.37%	1,161,382	99.03%	10,393,613	99.03%
Rejected Votes	770	0.63%	11,394	0.97%	101,838	0.97%
Total Polled	122,049	78.38%	1,172,776	76.09%	10,495,451	66.70%
Registered Electors	155,720		1,541,242		15,734,587	

=== 2005 Sri Lankan Presidential Election ===
Party	Homagama		Colombo Electoral District		Sri Lanka	
Party	Votes	%	Votes	%	Votes	%
UPFA	64,433	59.18%	534,431	47.96%	4,887,152	50.29%
UNP	43,477	39.93%	569,627	51.12%	4,706,366	48.43%
Other Parties (with < 1%)	972	0.89%	10,192	0.91%	123,521	1.27%
Valid Votes	108,882	99.06%	1,114,250	98.86%	9,717,039	98.88%
Rejected Votes	1,035	0.94%	12,879	1.14%	109,869	1.12%
Total Polled	109,917	77.42%	1,127,129	75.85%	9,826,908	69.51%
Registered Electors	141,974		1,486,021		14,136,979	

=== 1999 Sri Lankan Presidential Election ===
Party	Homagama		Colombo Electoral District		Sri Lanka	
Party	Votes	%	Votes	%	Votes	%
PA	46,823	55.66%	474,310	49.18%	4,312,157	51.12%
UNP	30,859	36.68%	425,185	44.08%	3,602,748	42.71%
JVP	4,878	5.80%	44,009	4.56%	343,927	4.08%
Other Parties (with < 1%)	1,563	1.86%	21,030	2.18%	176,679	2.09%
Valid Votes	84,123	97.25%	964,534	97.06%	8,435,754	97.69%
Rejected Votes	2,383	2.75%	29,197	2.94%	199,536	2.31%
Total Polled	86,506	74.21%	993,731	73.39%	8,635,290	72.17%
Registered Electors	116,577		1,354,025		11,965,536	

=== 1994 Sri Lankan Presidential Election ===
Party	Homagama		Colombo Electoral District		Sri Lanka	
Party	Votes	%	Votes	%	Votes	%
PA	45,072	65.68%	557,708	64.82%	4,709,205	62.28%
UNP	22,369	32.60%	288,741	33.56%	2,715,283	35.91%
Other Parties (with < 1%)	1,178	1.72%	13,937	1.62%	137,040	1.81%
Valid Votes	68,619	98.42%	860,386	98.17%	7,561,526	98.03%
Rejected Votes	1,102	1.58%	16,060	1.83%	151,706	1.97%
Total Polled	69,721	65.44%	876,446	69.59%	7,713,232	69.12%
Registered Electors	106,536		1,259,484		11,158,880	

=== 1988 Sri Lankan Presidential Election ===
Party	Homagama		Colombo Electoral District		Sri Lanka	
Party	Votes	%	Votes	%	Votes	%
SLFP	27,570	55.02%	339,958	46.23%	2,289,857	44.95%
UNP	20,810	41.53%	361,337	49.14%	2,569,199	50.43%
SLMP	1,730	3.45%	34,020	4.63%	235,701	4.63%
Valid Votes	50,110	98.66%	735,315	98.49%	5,094,754	98.24%
Rejected Votes	679	1.34%	11,295	1.51%	91,499	1.76%
Total Polled	50,789	58.39%	746,610	67.53%	5,186,256	55.87%
Registered Electors	86,987		1,105,583		9,283,143	

=== 1982 Sri Lankan Presidential Election ===
Party	Homagama		Colombo Electoral District		Sri Lanka	
Party	Votes	%	Votes	%	Votes	%
UNP	27,981	51.72%	436,290	57.86%	3,450,815	52.93%
SLFP	23,135	42.76%	274,476	36.40%	2,546,348	39.05%
JVP	2,140	3.96%	28,580	3.79%	273,428	4.19%
LSSP	591	1.09%	9,655	1.28%	58,531	0.90%
Other Parties (with < 1%)	255	0.47%	5,030	0.67%	190,929	2.93%
Valid Votes	54,102	99.00%	754,031	98.95%	6,520,156	98.78%
Rejected Votes	548	1.00%	7,990	1.05%	80,470	1.22%
Total Polled	54,650	79.25%	762,021	76.88%	6,600,626	80.15%
Registered Electors	68,955		991,194		8,235,358	

== Parliamentary Election Results ==
=== Summary ===
The winner of Homagama has matched the final country result 6 out of 7 times. Hence, Homagama might be considered a bellwether for Parliamentary Elections.

Year	Homagama	Colombo Electoral District	MAE %	Sri Lanka	MAE %
2015	UPFA	UNP	11.55%	UNP	6.34%
2010	UPFA	UPFA	7.96%	UPFA	0.91%
2004	UPFA	UNP	9.64%	UPFA	6.12%
2001	UNP	UNP	7.29%	UNP	3.09%
2000	PA	UNP	5.57%	PA	1.67%
1994	PA	PA	2.31%	PA	4.30%
1989	UNP	UNP	2.58%	UNP	2.29%
Matches/Mean MAE	6/7	5/7	6.70%	7/7	3.53%

=== 2020 Sri Lankan Parliamentary Election ===
Party	Homagama		Colombo Electoral District		Sri Lanka	
Party	Votes	%	Votes	%	Votes	%
SLPFA	95,118	72.21%	674,603	57.04%	6,853,693	59.09%
SJB	23,184	17.61%	387,145	32.73%	2,771,984	23.9%
JJB	8,712	6.61%	67,600	5.72%	445,958	3.84%
UNP	2,476	1.88%	30,875	2.61%	249,435	2.15%
Other Parties (with < 1%)	2,236	1.71%	22,553	1.9%	1,227,859	11.02%
Valid Votes	131,726	68.74%	1,182,776	69.2%	11,598,936	71.32%
Rejected Votes	8,032	4.19%	81,034	4.74%	744,373	4.58%
Total Polled	139,758	72.93%	1,263,810	73.94%	12,343,309	75.89%
Registered Electors	191,627		1,709,209		16,263,885	

=== 2015 Sri Lankan Parliamentary Election ===
Party	Homagama		Colombo Electoral District		Sri Lanka	
Party	Votes	%	Votes	%	Votes	%
UPFA	66,450	50.85%	474,063	39.25%	4,732,664	42.48%
UNP	52,336	40.05%	640,743	53.04%	5,098,916	45.77%
JVP	10,719	8.20%	81,391	6.74%	544,154	4.88%
Other Parties (with < 1%)	1,184	0.91%	11,752	0.97%	93,045	0.84%
Valid Votes	130,689	96.97%	1,207,949	96.46%	11,140,333	95.35%
Rejected Votes	4,026	2.99%	43,372	3.46%	516,926	4.42%
Total Polled	134,766	77.05%	1,252,271	78.93%	11,684,111	77.66%
Registered Electors	174,909		1,586,598		15,044,490	

=== 2010 Sri Lankan Parliamentary Election ===
Party	Homagama		Colombo Electoral District		Sri Lanka	
Party	Votes	%	Votes	%	Votes	%
UPFA	57,951	60.84%	480,896	51.23%	4,846,388	60.38%
UNP	26,841	28.18%	339,750	36.19%	2,357,057	29.37%
DNA	10,103	10.61%	110,683	11.79%	441,251	5.50%
Other Parties (with < 1%)	360	0.38%	7,182	0.77%	47,940	0.60%
Valid Votes	95,255	95.72%	938,723	94.85%	8,026,322	96.03%
Rejected Votes	4,206	4.23%	50,354	5.09%	581,465	6.96%
Total Polled	99,517	63.91%	989,729	64.17%	8,358,246	59.29%
Registered Electors	155,720		1,542,457		14,097,690	

=== 2004 Sri Lankan Parliamentary Election ===
Party	Homagama		Colombo Electoral District		Sri Lanka	
Party	Votes	%	Votes	%	Votes	%
UPFA	49,520	51.03%	414,688	39.20%	4,223,126	45.70%
UNP	29,029	29.91%	441,841	41.77%	3,486,792	37.73%
JHU	17,768	18.31%	190,618	18.02%	552,723	5.98%
Other Parties (with < 1%)	726	0.75%	10,713	1.01%	90,868	0.98%
Valid Votes	97,043	96.49%	1,057,860	96.47%	9,241,931	94.52%
Rejected Votes	3,516	3.50%	38,605	3.52%	534,452	5.47%
Total Polled	100,577	74.37%	1,096,571	74.71%	9,777,821	75.74%
Registered Electors	135,242		1,467,751		12,909,631	

=== 2001 Sri Lankan Parliamentary Election ===
Party	Homagama		Colombo Electoral District		Sri Lanka	
Party	Votes	%	Votes	%	Votes	%
UNP	39,943	42.58%	546,417	51.62%	4,086,026	45.62%
PA	37,389	39.86%	353,401	33.39%	3,330,815	37.19%
JVP	14,159	15.09%	117,404	11.09%	815,353	9.10%
SU	1,229	1.31%	16,970	1.60%	50,665	0.57%
Other Parties (with < 1%)	1,086	1.16%	24,289	2.29%	510,616	5.70%
Valid Votes	93,806	96.18%	1,058,481	96.28%	8,955,844	94.77%
Rejected Votes	3,725	3.82%	40,901	3.72%	494,009	5.23%
Total Polled	97,531	76.54%	1,099,382	76.31%	9,449,878	76.03%
Registered Electors	127,422		1,440,682		12,428,762	

=== 2000 Sri Lankan Parliamentary Election ===
Party	Homagama		Colombo Electoral District		Sri Lanka	
Party	Votes	%	Votes	%	Votes	%
PA	41,330	46.81%	394,146	38.86%	3,899,329	45.33%
UNP	33,930	38.43%	440,684	43.45%	3,451,765	40.12%
JVP	8,758	9.92%	78,133	7.70%	518,725	6.03%
SU	3,283	3.72%	49,671	4.90%	127,859	1.49%
Other Parties (with < 1%)	988	1.12%	51,586	5.09%	375,083	4.36%
Valid Votes	88,289	N/A	1,014,220	N/A	8,602,617	N/A

=== 1994 Sri Lankan Parliamentary Election ===
Party	Homagama		Colombo Electoral District		Sri Lanka	
Party	Votes	%	Votes	%	Votes	%
PA	40,034	53.71%	469,642	50.94%	3,887,805	48.94%
UNP	29,566	39.66%	385,100	41.77%	3,498,370	44.04%
MEP	3,409	4.57%	42,734	4.64%	68,538	0.86%
SLPF	1,180	1.58%	11,454	1.24%	90,078	1.13%
Other Parties (with < 1%)	355	0.48%	13,003	1.41%	51,995	0.65%
Valid Votes	74,544	96.21%	921,933	96.18%	7,943,688	95.20%
Rejected Votes	2,938	3.79%	36,635	3.82%	400,395	4.80%
Total Polled	77,482	72.73%	958,568	76.04%	8,344,095	74.75%
Registered Electors	106,536		1,260,686		11,163,064	

=== 1989 Sri Lankan Parliamentary Election ===
Party	Homagama		Colombo Electoral District		Sri Lanka	
Party	Votes	%	Votes	%	Votes	%
UNP	24,795	48.66%	374,530	51.67%	2,838,005	50.71%
SLFP	14,872	29.19%	205,053	28.29%	1,785,369	31.90%
MEP	7,920	15.54%	76,966	10.62%	90,480	1.62%
ELJP	1,846	3.62%	7,112	0.98%	67,723	1.21%
USA	1,440	2.83%	31,873	4.40%	141,983	2.54%
Other Parties (with < 1%)	81	0.16%	29,308	4.04%	202,016	3.61%
Valid Votes	50,954	94.32%	724,842	95.36%	5,596,468	93.87%
Rejected Votes	3,068	5.68%	35,271	4.64%	365,563	6.13%
Total Polled	54,022	65.77%	760,113	69.87%	5,962,031	63.60%
Registered Electors	82,139		1,087,891		9,374,164	

== Demographics ==
=== Ethnicity ===
The Homagama Polling Division has a Sinhalese majority (98.1%) . In comparison, the Colombo Electoral District (which contains the Homagama Polling Division) has a Sinhalese majority (76.5%), a significant Moor population (10.7%) and a significant Sri Lankan Tamil population (10.1%)

Ethnicity in Homagama
1. Sinhalese (98.1%)
2. Other (1.90%)

=== Religion ===
The Homagama Polling Division has a Buddhist majority (96.2%) . In comparison, the Colombo Electoral District (which contains the Homagama Polling Division) has a Buddhist majority (70.2%) and a significant Muslim population (11.8%)

Religion in Homagama
1. Buddhist (96.2%)
2. Other (2.30%)
3. Roman Catholic (1.50%)
