= Ihala Hanwella South Grama Niladhari Division =

Ihala Hanwella South
- Grama Niladhari Division
- Interactive map of Ihala Hanwella South
- Coordinates: 6.894986°N 80.093020°E
- Country: Sri Lanka
- Province: Western Province
- District: Colombo District
- Divisional Secretariat: Seethawaka Divisional Secretariat
- Electoral District: Colombo Electoral District
- Polling Division: Avissawella Polling Division

Area
  - Total: 0.92 km^{2} (0.36 sq mi)
- Elevation: 78 m (256 ft)

Population (2012)
  - Total: 1,041
  - Density: 1,132/km^{2} (2,930/sq mi)
- ISO 3166 code: LK-1115270

Ihala Hanwella South

Ihala Hanwella South Grama Niladhari Division is a Grama Niladhari Division of the Seethawaka Divisional Secretariat of Colombo District of Western Province, Sri Lanka. It has Grama Niladhari Division Code 443C.

Niripola are located within, nearby or associated with Ihala Hanwella South.

Ihala Hanwella South is a surrounded by the Diddeniya North, Hanwella Town, Ihala Hanwella North, Thunnana East, Koodaluvila and Pahathgama Grama Niladhari Divisions.

== Demographics ==
=== Ethnicity ===
The Ihala Hanwella South Grama Niladhari Division has a Sinhalese majority (97.8%). In comparison, the Seethawaka Divisional Secretariat (which contains the Ihala Hanwella South Grama Niladhari Division) has a Sinhalese majority (88.2%)

Ethnicity in Ihala Hanwella South
1. Sinhalese (97.8%)
2. Sri Lankan Tamil (1.40%)
3. Other (0.80%)

=== Religion ===
The Ihala Hanwella South Grama Niladhari Division has a Buddhist majority (90.6%). In comparison, the Seethawaka Divisional Secretariat (which contains the Ihala Hanwella South Grama Niladhari Division) has a Buddhist majority (81.5%)

Religion in Ihala Hanwella South
1. Buddhist (90.6%)
2. Roman Catholic (6.60%)
3. Other Christian (1.70%)
4. Other (1.10%)
