= Bollathawa Grama Niladhari Division =

Bollathawa
- Grama Niladhari Division
- Interactive map of Bollathawa
- Coordinates: 6.958399°N 80.119473°E
- Country: Sri Lanka
- Province: Western Province
- District: Colombo District
- Divisional Secretariat: Seethawaka Divisional Secretariat
- Electoral District: Colombo Electoral District
- Polling Division: Avissawella Polling Division

Area
  - Total: 2.57 km^{2} (0.99 sq mi)
- Elevation: 53 m (174 ft)

Population (2012)
  - Total: 1,700
  - Density: 661/km^{2} (1,710/sq mi)
- ISO 3166 code: LK-1115005

Bollathawa

Bollathawa Grama Niladhari Division is a Grama Niladhari Division of the Seethawaka Divisional Secretariat of Colombo District of Western Province, Sri Lanka. It has Grama Niladhari Division Code 433.

Kumarimulla are located within, nearby or associated with Bollathawa.

Bollathawa is a surrounded by the Akaravita, Thawalgoda, Muruthagama, Nikawala, Ovitigama, Kumarimulla and Kanampella West Grama Niladhari Divisions.

== Demographics ==
=== Ethnicity ===
The Bollathawa Grama Niladhari Division has a Sinhalese majority (99.8%). In comparison, the Seethawaka Divisional Secretariat (which contains the Bollathawa Grama Niladhari Division) has a Sinhalese majority (88.2%)

Ethnicity in Bollathawa
1. Sinhalese (99.8%)
2. Other (0.20%)

=== Religion ===
The Bollathawa Grama Niladhari Division has a Buddhist majority (98.6%). In comparison, the Seethawaka Divisional Secretariat (which contains the Bollathawa Grama Niladhari Division) has a Buddhist majority (81.5%)

Religion in Bollathawa
1. Buddhist (98.6%)
2. Roman Catholic (1.20%)
3. Other (0.10%)
