= Puwakpitiya (Seethawaka) Grama Niladhari Division =

Puwakpitiya
- Grama Niladhari Division
- Interactive map of Puwakpitiya
- Coordinates: 6.936841°N 80.192182°E
- Country: Sri Lanka
- Province: Western Province
- District: Colombo District
- Divisional Secretariat: Seethawaka Divisional Secretariat
- Electoral District: Colombo Electoral District
- Polling Division: Avissawella Polling Division

Area
  - Total: 0.41 km^{2} (0.16 sq mi)
- Elevation: 64 m (210 ft)

Population (2012)
  - Total: 1,307
  - Density: 3,188/km^{2} (8,260/sq mi)
- ISO 3166 code: LK-1115155

Puwakpitiya

Puwakpitiya Grama Niladhari Division is a Grama Niladhari Division of the Seethawaka Divisional Secretariat of Colombo District of Western Province, Sri Lanka. It has Grama Niladhari Division Code 431.

Puwakpitiya is a surrounded by the Egodagama, Kiriwandala North, Kiriwandala South, Puwakpitiya South and Weragolla North Grama Niladhari Divisions.

== Demographics ==
=== Ethnicity ===
The Puwakpitiya Grama Niladhari Division has a Sinhalese majority (69.4%) and a significant Sri Lankan Tamil population (24.3%). In comparison, the Seethawaka Divisional Secretariat (which contains the Puwakpitiya Grama Niladhari Division) has a Sinhalese majority (88.2%)

Ethnicity in Puwakpitiya
1. Sinhalese (69.4%)
2. Sri Lankan Tamil (24.3%)
3. Moor (4.40%)
4. Indian Tamil (1.50%)
5. Other (0.50%)

=== Religion ===
The Puwakpitiya Grama Niladhari Division has a Buddhist majority (65.3%) and a significant Hindu population (21.7%). In comparison, the Seethawaka Divisional Secretariat (which contains the Puwakpitiya Grama Niladhari Division) has a Buddhist majority (81.5%)

Religion in Puwakpitiya
1. Buddhist (65.3%)
2. Hindu (21.7%)
3. Other Christian (5.80%)
4. Muslim (4.40%)
5. Roman Catholic (2.80%)
6. Other (0.00%)
