= Waga North Grama Niladhari Division =

Waga North
- Grama Niladhari Division
- Interactive map of Waga North
- Coordinates: 6.874695°N 80.141178°E
- Country: Sri Lanka
- Province: Western Province
- District: Colombo District
- Divisional Secretariat: Padukka Divisional Secretariat
- Electoral District: Colombo Electoral District
- Polling Division: Avissawella Polling Division

Area
  - Total: 1.05 km^{2} (0.41 sq mi)
- Elevation: 78 m (256 ft)

Population (2012)
  - Total: 857
  - Density: 816/km^{2} (2,110/sq mi)
- ISO 3166 code: LK-1118015

Waga North

Waga North Grama Niladhari Division is a Grama Niladhari Division of the Padukka Divisional Secretariat of Colombo District of Western Province, Sri Lanka. It has Grama Niladhari Division Code 457B.

Waga North is a surrounded by the Pelpola, Pinnawala South, Waga East, Waga West and Elamalawala Grama Niladhari Divisions.

== Demographics ==
=== Ethnicity ===
The Waga North Grama Niladhari Division has a Sinhalese majority (100.0%). In comparison, the Padukka Divisional Secretariat (which contains the Waga North Grama Niladhari Division) has a Sinhalese majority (95.8%)

Ethnicity in Waga North
1. Sinhalese (100.0%)
2. Other (0.00%)

=== Religion ===
The Waga North Grama Niladhari Division has a Buddhist majority (98.9%). In comparison, the Padukka Divisional Secretariat (which contains the Waga North Grama Niladhari Division) has a Buddhist majority (94.6%)

Religion in Waga North
1. Buddhist (98.9%)
2. Roman Catholic (1.10%)
3. Other (0.00%)
