= Lahirugama Grama Niladhari Division =

Lahirugama
- Grama Niladhari Division
- Interactive map of Lahirugama
- Coordinates: 6.899326°N 80.156448°E
- Country: Sri Lanka
- Province: Western Province
- District: Colombo District
- Divisional Secretariat: Seethawaka Divisional Secretariat
- Electoral District: Colombo Electoral District
- Polling Division: Avissawella Polling Division

Area
  - Total: 7.04 km^{2} (2.72 sq mi)
- Elevation: 89 m (292 ft)

Population (2012)
  - Total: 2,146
  - Density: 305/km^{2} (790/sq mi)
- ISO 3166 code: LK-1115240

Lahirugama

Lahirugama Grama Niladhari Division is a Grama Niladhari Division of the Seethawaka Divisional Secretariat of Colombo District of Western Province, Sri Lanka. It has Grama Niladhari Division Code 442D.

Lahirugama is a surrounded by the Pelpola, Digana, Hingurala, Ilukovita, Kadugoda North, Kadugoda South, Welikanna and Mambula Grama Niladhari Divisions.

== Demographics ==
=== Ethnicity ===
The Lahirugama Grama Niladhari Division has a Sinhalese majority (74.0%) and a significant Indian Tamil population (23.3%). In comparison, the Seethawaka Divisional Secretariat (which contains the Lahirugama Grama Niladhari Division) has a Sinhalese majority (88.2%)

Ethnicity in Lahirugama
1. Sinhalese (74.0%)
2. Indian Tamil (23.3%)
3. Sri Lankan Tamil (2.10%)
4. Other (0.60%)

=== Religion ===
The Lahirugama Grama Niladhari Division has a Buddhist majority (67.1%) and a significant Hindu population (23.9%). In comparison, the Seethawaka Divisional Secretariat (which contains the Lahirugama Grama Niladhari Division) has a Buddhist majority (81.5%)

Religion in Lahirugama
1. Buddhist (67.1%)
2. Hindu (23.9%)
3. Roman Catholic (6.80%)
4. Other Christian (1.80%)
5. Other (0.40%)
