= Seethagama Grama Niladhari Division =

Seethagama
- Grama Niladhari Division
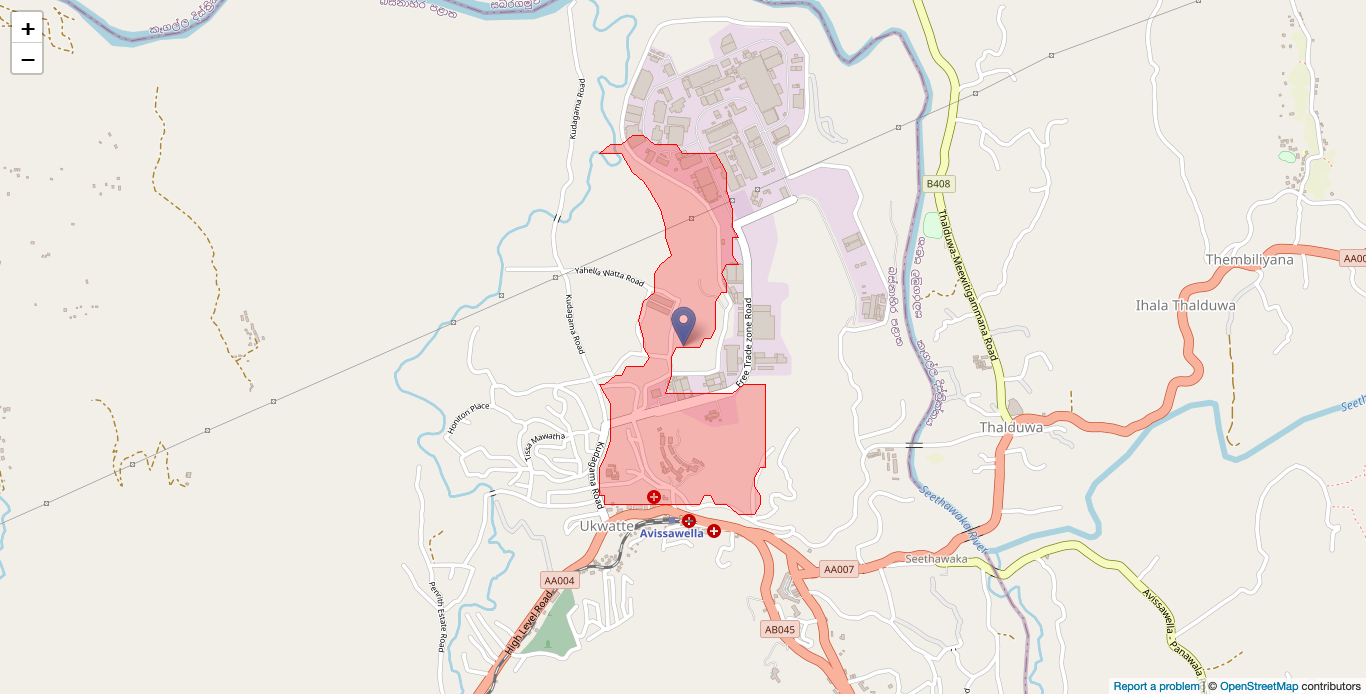
- Seethagama Grama Niladhari Division
- Coordinates: 6.961948°N 80.207766°E
- Country: Sri Lanka
- Province: Western Province
- District: Colombo District
- Divisional Secretariat: Seethawaka Divisional Secretariat
- Electoral District: Colombo Electoral District
- Polling Division: Avissawella Polling Division

Area
  - Total: 0.81 km^{2} (0.31 sq mi)
- Elevation: 47 m (154 ft)

Population (2012)
  - Total: 2,316
  - Density: 2,859/km^{2} (7,400/sq mi)
- ISO 3166 code: LK-1115045

Seethagama Grama Niladhari Division is a Grama Niladhari Division of the Seethawaka Divisional Secretariat of Colombo District of Western Province, Sri Lanka. It has Grama Niladhari Division Code 432F.

Seethagama is a surrounded by the Avissawella, Ukwatta, Agra Pedesa, Kudagama and Weralupitiya Grama Niladhari Divisions.

== Demographics ==
=== Ethnicity ===
The Seethagama Grama Niladhari Division has a Sinhalese majority (83.7%). In comparison, the Seethawaka Divisional Secretariat (which contains the Seethagama Grama Niladhari Division) has a Sinhalese majority (88.2%)

Ethnicity in Seethagama
1. Sinhalese (83.7%)
2. Sri Lankan Tamil (9.30%)
3. Indian Tamil (4.60%)
4. Moor (1.50%)
5. Other (0.90%)

=== Religion ===
The Seethagama Grama Niladhari Division has a Buddhist majority (79.1%) and a significant Hindu population (11.0%). In comparison, the Seethawaka Divisional Secretariat (which contains the Seethagama Grama Niladhari Division) has a Buddhist majority (81.5%).

Religion in Seethagama
1. Buddhist (79.1%)
2. Hindu (11.0%)
3. Roman Catholic (4.70%)
4. Other Christian (3.20%)
5. Muslim (1.80%)
6. Other (0.20%)
