= Pinnawala South Grama Niladhari Division =

Pinnawala South
- Grama Niladhari Division
- Interactive map of Pinnawala South
- Coordinates: 6.874782°N 80.128815°E
- Country: Sri Lanka
- Province: Western Province
- District: Colombo District
- Divisional Secretariat: Padukka Divisional Secretariat
- Electoral District: Colombo Electoral District
- Polling Division: Avissawella Polling Division

Area
  - Total: 2.44 km^{2} (0.94 sq mi)
- Elevation: 44 m (144 ft)

Population (2012)
  - Total: 1,518
  - Density: 622/km^{2} (1,610/sq mi)
- ISO 3166 code: LK-1118010

Pinnawala South

Pinnawala South Grama Niladhari Division is a Grama Niladhari Division of the Padukka Divisional Secretariat of Colombo District of Western Province, Sri Lanka. It has Grama Niladhari Division Code 456A.

Pinnawala South is a surrounded by the Pinnawala North, Uggalla, Elamalawala, Waga North, Waga West, Neluwattuduwa and Kahahena Grama Niladhari Divisions.

== Demographics ==
=== Ethnicity ===
The Pinnawala South Grama Niladhari Division has a Sinhalese majority (99.4%). In comparison, the Padukka Divisional Secretariat (which contains the Pinnawala South Grama Niladhari Division) has a Sinhalese majority (95.8%)

Ethnicity in Pinnawala South
1. Sinhalese (99.4%)
2. Other (0.60%)

=== Religion ===
The Pinnawala South Grama Niladhari Division has a Buddhist majority (98.4%). In comparison, the Padukka Divisional Secretariat (which contains the Pinnawala South Grama Niladhari Division) has a Buddhist majority (94.6%)

Religion in Pinnawala South
1. Buddhist (98.4%)
2. Other (1.60%)
