= Kanampella East Grama Niladhari Division =

Kanampella East
- Grama Niladhari Division
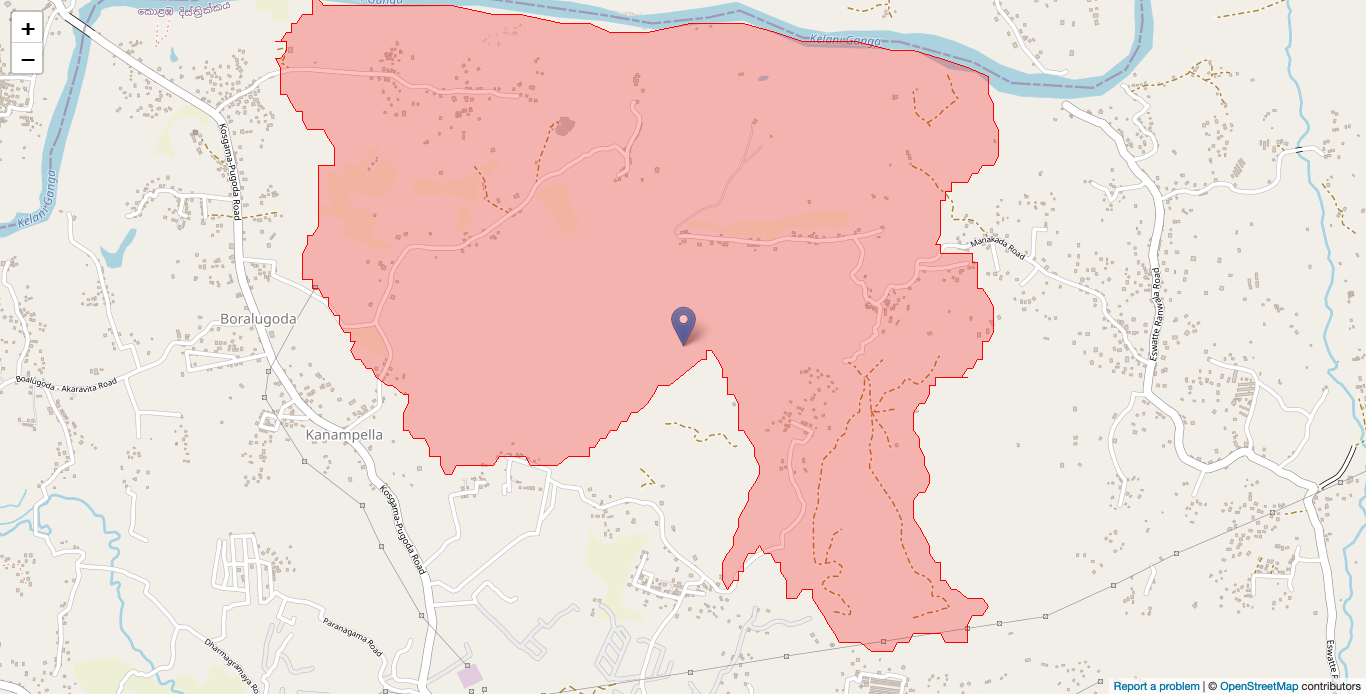
- Kanampella East Grama Niladhari Division
- Coordinates: 6.959722°N 80.149194°E
- Country: Sri Lanka
- Province: Western Province
- District: Colombo District
- Divisional Secretariat: Seethawaka Divisional Secretariat
- Electoral District: Colombo Electoral District
- Polling Division: Avissawella Polling Division

Area
  - Total: 7.47 km^{2} (2.88 sq mi)
- Elevation: 104 m (341 ft)

Population (2012)
  - Total: 1,080
  - Density: 145/km^{2} (380/sq mi)
- ISO 3166 code: LK-1115015

Kanampella East Grama Niladhari Division is a Grama Niladhari Division of the Seethawaka Divisional Secretariat of Colombo District of Western Province, Sri Lanka . Its Division Code is 425.

Kanampella East is surrounded by the Wedagama, Ranwala, Udakanampella South, Udugama, Senasungoda, Ihala Kosgama North, Kanampella West, Manakada, Miriswatta and Thawalgoda Grama Niladhari Divisions.

== Demographics ==
=== Ethnicity ===
The Kanampella East Grama Niladhari Division has a Sinhalese majority (85.6%) and a significant Sri Lankan Tamil population (10.2%). In comparison, the Seethawaka Divisional Secretariat (which contains the Kanampella East Grama Niladhari Division) has a Sinhalese majority (88.2%).

Ethnicity in Kanampella East
1. Sinhalese (85.6%)
2. Sri Lankan Tamil (10.2%)
3. Indian Tamil (4.30%)
4. Other (0.00%)

=== Religion ===
The Kanampella East Grama Niladhari Division has a Buddhist majority (84.4%) and a significant Hindu population (10.8%). In comparison, the Seethawaka Divisional Secretariat (which contains the Kanampella East Grama Niladhari Division) has a Buddhist majority (81.5%).

Religion in Kanampella East
1. Buddhist (84.4%)
2. Hindu (10.8%)
3. Other Christian (3.20%)
4. Roman Catholic (1.60%)
5. Other (0.00%)
