= Horagala East (Padukka) Grama Niladhari Division =

Horagala East
- Grama Niladhari Division
- Interactive map of Horagala East
- Coordinates: 6.811231°N 80.066017°E
- Country: Sri Lanka
- Province: Western Province
- District: Colombo District
- Divisional Secretariat: Padukka Divisional Secretariat
- Electoral District: Colombo Electoral District
- Polling Division: Avissawella Polling Division

Area
  - Total: 2.39 km^{2} (0.92 sq mi)
- Elevation: 30 m (98 ft)

Population (2012)
  - Total: 1,763
  - Density: 738/km^{2} (1,910/sq mi)
- ISO 3166 code: LK-1118180

Horagala East

Horagala East Grama Niladhari Division is a Grama Niladhari Division of the Padukka Divisional Secretariat of Colombo District of Western Province, Sri Lanka . It has Grama Niladhari Division Code 464.

Horagala East is a surrounded by the Pahala Millewa North, Kotigamgoda, Dampe, Kurugala, Horagala West, Horakandawala, Madulawa North and Madulawa South Grama Niladhari Divisions.

== Demographics ==
=== Ethnicity ===
The Horagala East Grama Niladhari Division has a Sinhalese majority (96.5%) . In comparison, the Padukka Divisional Secretariat (which contains the Horagala East Grama Niladhari Division) has a Sinhalese majority (95.8%)

Ethnicity in Horagala East
1. Sinhalese (96.5%)
2. Sri Lankan Tamil (3.30%)
3. Other (0.20%)

=== Religion ===
The Horagala East Grama Niladhari Division has a Buddhist majority (96.3%) . In comparison, the Padukka Divisional Secretariat (which contains the Horagala East Grama Niladhari Division) has a Buddhist majority (94.6%)

Religion in Horagala East
1. Buddhist (96.3%)
2. Hindu (2.40%)
3. Other (1.30%)
