= Pitumpe South Grama Niladhari Division =

Pitumpe South
- Grama Niladhari Division
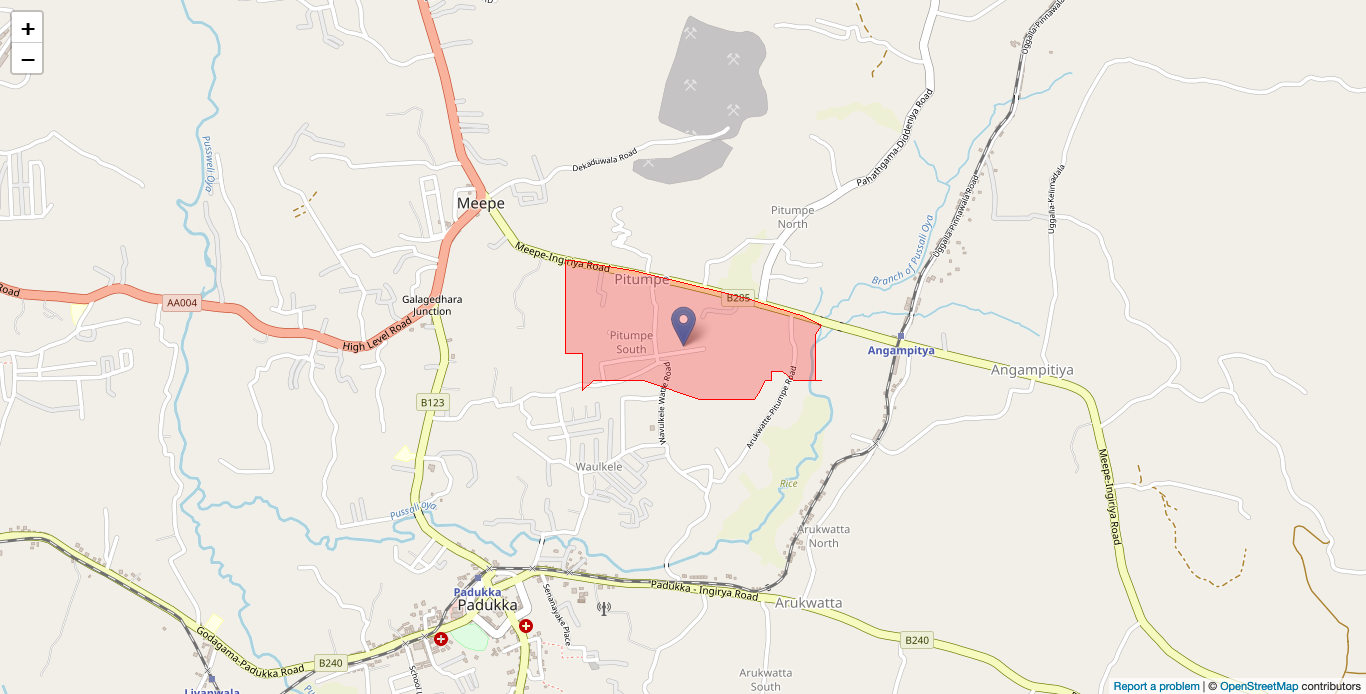
- Pitumpe South Grama Niladhari Division
- Coordinates: 6.852490°N 80.100049°E
- Country: Sri Lanka
- Province: Western Province
- District: Colombo District
- Divisional Secretariat: Padukka Divisional Secretariat
- Electoral District: Colombo Electoral District
- Polling Division: Avissawella Polling Division

Area
  - Total: 0.58 km^{2} (0.22 sq mi)
- Elevation: 37 m (121 ft)

Population (2012)
  - Total: 1,332
  - Density: 2,297/km^{2} (5,950/sq mi)
- ISO 3166 code: LK-1118070

Pitumpe South Grama Niladhari Division is a Grama Niladhari Division of the Padukka Divisional Secretariat of Colombo District of Western Province, Sri Lanka . It has Grama Niladhari Division Code 453B.

Pitumpe South is a surrounded by the Arukwatta North, Pitumpe North, Angampitiya and Galagedara East Grama Niladhari Divisions.

== Demographics ==
=== Ethnicity ===
The Pitumpe South Grama Niladhari Division has a Sinhalese majority (97.6%) . In comparison, the Padukka Divisional Secretariat (which contains the Pitumpe South Grama Niladhari Division) has a Sinhalese majority (95.8%)

Ethnicity in Pitumpe South
1. Sinhalese (97.6%)
2. Moor (2.20%)
3. Other (0.20%)

=== Religion ===
The Pitumpe South Grama Niladhari Division has a Buddhist majority (96.4%) . In comparison, the Padukka Divisional Secretariat (which contains the Pitumpe South Grama Niladhari Division) has a Buddhist majority (94.6%)

Religion in Pitumpe South
1. Buddhist (96.4%)
2. Muslim (2.40%)
3. Other (1.20%)
