= Egodagama (Seethawaka) Grama Niladhari Division =

Egodagama
- Grama Niladhari Division
- Interactive map of Egodagama
- Coordinates: 6.928946°N 80.191054°E
- Country: Sri Lanka
- Province: Western Province
- District: Colombo District
- Divisional Secretariat: Seethawaka Divisional Secretariat
- Electoral District: Colombo Electoral District
- Polling Division: Avissawella Polling Division

Area
  - Total: 0.98 km^{2} (0.38 sq mi)
- Elevation: 29 m (95 ft)

Population (2012)
  - Total: 1,301
  - Density: 1,328/km^{2} (3,440/sq mi)
- ISO 3166 code: LK-1115160

Egodagama

Egodagama Grama Niladhari Division is a Grama Niladhari Division of the Seethawaka Divisional Secretariat of Colombo District of Western Province, Sri Lanka . It has Grama Niladhari Division Code 431D.

Egodagama is a surrounded by the Puwakpitiya South, Weragolla South, Weragolla North and Puwakpitiya Grama Niladhari Divisions.

== Demographics ==
=== Ethnicity ===
The Egodagama Grama Niladhari Division has a Sinhalese majority (86.0%) and a significant Sri Lankan Tamil population (12.3%) . In comparison, the Seethawaka Divisional Secretariat (which contains the Egodagama Grama Niladhari Division) has a Sinhalese majority (88.2%)

Ethnicity in Egodagama
1. Sinhalese (86.0%)
2. Sri Lankan Tamil (12.3%)
3. Indian Tamil (1.40%)
4. Other (0.30%)

=== Religion ===
The Egodagama Grama Niladhari Division has a Buddhist majority (69.4%), a significant Roman Catholic population (17.9%) and a significant Hindu population (10.9%) . In comparison, the Seethawaka Divisional Secretariat (which contains the Egodagama Grama Niladhari Division) has a Buddhist majority (81.5%)

Religion in Egodagama
1. Buddhist (69.4%)
2. Roman Catholic (17.9%)
3. Hindu (10.9%)
4. Other Christian (1.50%)
5. Other (0.20%)
