= Angamuwa (Padukka) Grama Niladhari Division =

Angamuwa
- Grama Niladhari Division
- Interactive map of Angamuwa
- Coordinates: 6.828221°N 80.106682°E
- Country: Sri Lanka
- Province: Western Province
- District: Colombo District
- Divisional Secretariat: Padukka Divisional Secretariat
- Electoral District: Colombo Electoral District
- Polling Division: Avissawella Polling Division

Area
  - Total: 2.61 km^{2} (1.01 sq mi)
- Elevation: 19 m (62 ft)

Population (2012)
  - Total: 1,593
  - Density: 610/km^{2} (1,600/sq mi)
- ISO 3166 code: LK-1118120

Angamuwa

Angamuwa Grama Niladhari Division is a Grama Niladhari Division of the Padukka Divisional Secretariat of Colombo District of Western Province, Sri Lanka. It has Grama Niladhari Division Code 461A.

Arukwatta are located within, nearby or associated with Angamuwa.

Angamuwa is a surrounded by the Arukwatta South, Miriyagalla, Udumulla, Padukka and Weragala Grama Niladhari Divisions.

== Demographics ==
=== Ethnicity ===
The Angamuwa Grama Niladhari Division has a Sinhalese majority (99.5%). In comparison, the Padukka Divisional Secretariat (which contains the Angamuwa Grama Niladhari Division) has a Sinhalese majority (95.8%)

Ethnicity in Angamuwa
1. Sinhalese (99.5%)
2. Other (0.50%)

=== Religion ===
The Angamuwa Grama Niladhari Division has a Buddhist majority (98.9%). In comparison, the Padukka Divisional Secretariat (which contains the Angamuwa Grama Niladhari Division) has a Buddhist majority (94.6%)

Religion in Angamuwa
1. Buddhist (98.9%)
2. Other (1.10%)
