= Mawathagama East Grama Niladhari Division =

Mawathagama East
- Grama Niladhari Division
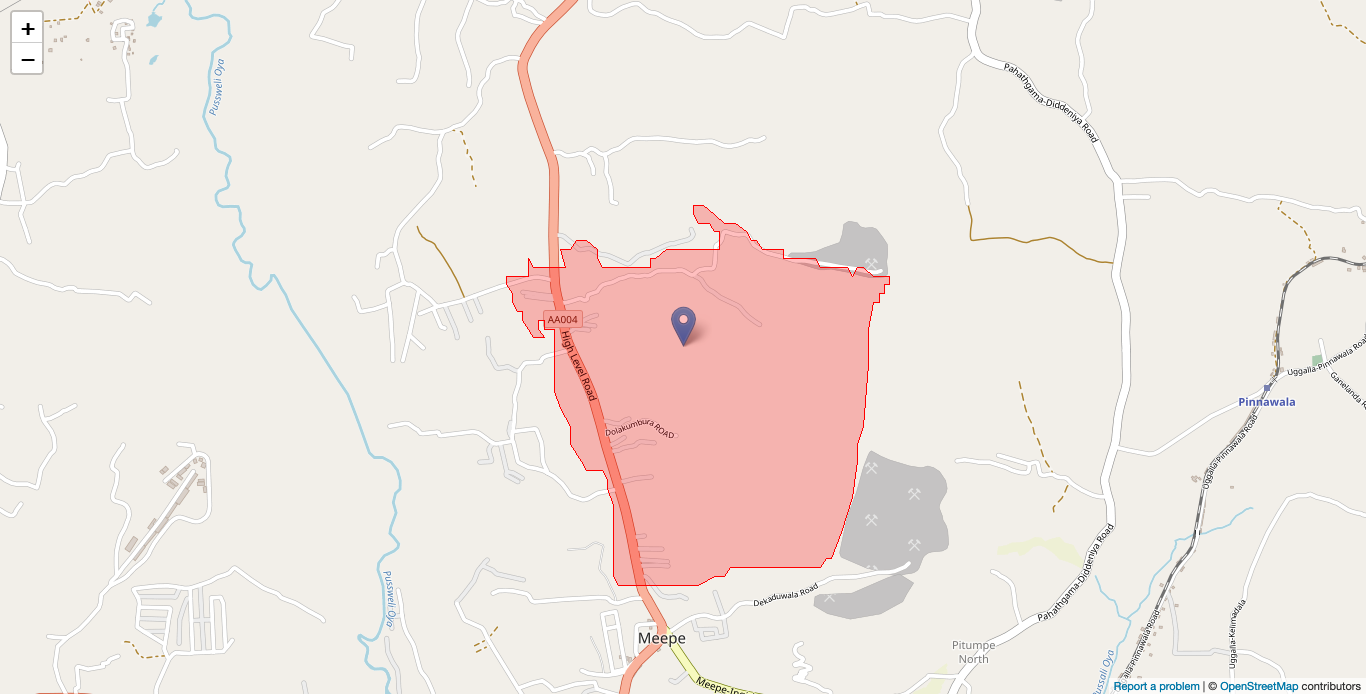
- Mawathagama East Grama Niladhari Division
- Coordinates: 6.871021°N 80.092273°E
- Country: Sri Lanka
- Province: Western Province
- District: Colombo District
- Divisional Secretariat: Seethawaka Divisional Secretariat
- Electoral District: Colombo Electoral District
- Polling Division: Avissawella Polling Division

Area
  - Total: 2.39 km^{2} (0.92 sq mi)
- Elevation: 69 m (226 ft)

Population (2012)
  - Total: 914
  - Density: 382/km^{2} (990/sq mi)
- ISO 3166 code: LK-1115340

Mawathagama East Grama Niladhari Division is a Grama Niladhari Division of the Seethawaka Divisional Secretariat of Colombo District of Western Province, Sri Lanka . It has Grama Niladhari Division Code 444A.

Mawathagama East is a surrounded by the Pitumpe North, Galagedara East, Galagedara North, Wewelpanawa, Diddeniya South, Kudakanda, Mawathagama West and Thunnana West Grama Niladhari Divisions.

== Demographics ==
=== Ethnicity ===
The Mawathagama East Grama Niladhari Division has a Sinhalese majority (98.1%) . In comparison, the Seethawaka Divisional Secretariat (which contains the Mawathagama East Grama Niladhari Division) has a Sinhalese majority (88.2%)

Ethnicity in Mawathagama East
1. Sinhalese (98.1%)
2. Indian Tamil (1.40%)
3. Other (0.40%)

=== Religion ===
The Mawathagama East Grama Niladhari Division has a Buddhist majority (94.4%) . In comparison, the Seethawaka Divisional Secretariat (which contains the Mawathagama East Grama Niladhari Division) has a Buddhist majority (81.5%)

Religion in Mawathagama East
1. Buddhist (94.4%)
2. Roman Catholic (2.70%)
3. Hindu (1.80%)
4. Other (1.10%)
