= Niripola =

Coordinates: 6°54′N 80°06′E

Niripola is a village in Western Province, Sri Lanka with an altitude of 101 metres (331 ft).
