= Kumarimulla =

Kumarimulla is a village close to Pugoda town western Sri Lanka.

Kumarimulla is located at 6°58′N 80°07′E (6.9667 80.1167). It lies 14 metres (46 ft) above sea level.
