= Padukka Divisional Secretariat =

- Divisional Secretariat
- Country: Sri Lanka
- Province: Western Province
- District: Colombo District

Population (2024 Census)
  - Total: 73 014
- Time zone: UTC+5:30 (Sri Lanka Standard Time)

Padukka Divisional Secretariat is a Divisional Secretariat of Colombo District, of Western Province, Sri Lanka.

== Demography ==
Religion in Padukka DS Division (2024)
1. Buddhist (94.8%)
2. Hindu (2.00%)
3. Muslim (1.70%)
4. Roman Catholic (0.70%)
5. Other Christian (0.80%)
6. Other (0.00%)
