= Seethawaka Divisional Secretariat =

- Divisional Secretariat
- Country: Sri Lanka
- Province: Western Province
- District: Colombo District
- Time zone: UTC+5:30 (Sri Lanka Standard Time)

Seethawaka Divisional Secretariat is a Divisional Secretariat of Colombo District, of Western Province, Sri Lanka.

== Demography ==
Religion in Seethawaka DS Division (2012)
1. Buddhist (81.5%)
2. Hindu (8.50%)
3. Muslim (0.90%)
4. Roman Catholic (7.30%)
5. Other Christian (1.80%)
6. Other (0.00%)
