= Avissawella Polling Division =

Avissawella
- Polling Division
- Coordinates: 6.883521°N 80.143088°E
- Country: Sri Lanka
- Province: Western Province, Sri Lanka
- Electoral District: Colombo Electoral District

Area
  - Total: 256.81 km^{2} (99.15 sq mi)

Population (2012)
  - Total: 179,074
  - Density: 697/km^{2} (1,810/sq mi)
- ISO 3166 code: EC-01K

The Avissawella Polling Division is a Polling Division in the Colombo Electoral District, in the Western Province, Sri Lanka.

== Presidential Election Results ==
=== Summary ===
The winner of Avissawella has matched the final country result 7 out of 8 times. Hence, Avissawella is a Bellwether for Presidential Elections.

Year	Avissawella	Colombo Electoral District	MAE %	Sri Lanka	MAE %
2019	SLPP	SLPP	6.93%	SLPP	7.84%
2015	UPFA	NDF	10.75%	NDF	6.32%
2010	UPFA	UPFA	11.14%	UPFA	5.87%
2005	UPFA	UNP	5.15%	UPFA	2.65%
1999	PA	PA	2.68%	PA	1.13%
1994	PA	PA	8.48%	PA	6.01%
1988	UNP	UNP	1.12%	UNP	2.10%
1982	UNP	UNP	7.13%	UNP	3.44%
Matches/Mean MAE	7/8	7/8	6.67%	8/8	4.42%

=== 2019 Sri Lankan Presidential Election ===
Party	Avissawella		Colombo Electoral District		Sri Lanka	
Party	Votes	%	Votes	%	Votes	%
SLPP	61,755	60.85%	727,713	53.19%	6,924,255	52.25%
NDF	34,532	34.03%	559,921	40.92%	5,564,239	41.99%
NMPP	3,184	3.14%	53,803	3.93%	418,553	3.16%
Other Parties (with < 1%)	2,019	1.99%	26,740	1.95%	345,452	2.61%
Valid Votes	101,490	99.13%	1,368,177	98.89%	13,252,499	98.99%
Rejected Votes	887	0.87%	15,333	1.11%	135,452	1.01%
Total Polled	102,377	85.38%	1,383,510	82.82%	13,387,951	83.71%
Registered Electors	119,905		1,670,403		15,992,568	

=== 2015 Sri Lankan Presidential Election ===
Party	Avissawella		Colombo Electoral District		Sri Lanka	
Party	Votes	%	Votes	%	Votes	%
UPFA	51,351	54.12%	562,614	43.40%	5,768,090	47.58%
NDF	42,728	45.03%	725,073	55.93%	6,217,162	51.28%
Other Parties (with < 1%)	801	0.84%	8,673	0.67%	138,200	1.14%
Valid Votes	94,880	98.92%	1,296,360	98.83%	12,123,452	98.85%
Rejected Votes	1,032	1.08%	15,334	1.17%	140,925	1.15%
Total Polled	95,912	81.65%	1,311,694	81.34%	12,264,377	78.69%
Registered Electors	117,472		1,612,660		15,585,942	

=== 2010 Sri Lankan Presidential Election ===
Party	Avissawella		Colombo Electoral District		Sri Lanka	
Party	Votes	%	Votes	%	Votes	%
UPFA	53,664	64.09%	614,740	52.93%	6,015,934	57.88%
NDF	28,875	34.49%	533,022	45.90%	4,173,185	40.15%
Other Parties (with < 1%)	1,193	1.42%	13,620	1.17%	204,494	1.97%
Valid Votes	83,732	99.18%	1,161,382	99.03%	10,393,613	99.03%
Rejected Votes	689	0.82%	11,394	0.97%	101,838	0.97%
Total Polled	84,421	78.07%	1,172,776	76.09%	10,495,451	66.70%
Registered Electors	108,138		1,541,242		15,734,587	

=== 2005 Sri Lankan Presidential Election ===
Party	Avissawella		Colombo Electoral District		Sri Lanka	
Party	Votes	%	Votes	%	Votes	%
UPFA	41,936	53.02%	534,431	47.96%	4,887,152	50.29%
UNP	36,227	45.80%	569,627	51.12%	4,706,366	48.43%
Other Parties (with < 1%)	935	1.18%	10,192	0.91%	123,521	1.27%
Valid Votes	79,098	98.92%	1,114,250	98.86%	9,717,039	98.88%
Rejected Votes	865	1.08%	12,879	1.14%	109,869	1.12%
Total Polled	79,963	79.12%	1,127,129	75.85%	9,826,908	69.51%
Registered Electors	101,065		1,486,021		14,136,979	

=== 1999 Sri Lankan Presidential Election ===
Party	Avissawella		Colombo Electoral District		Sri Lanka	
Party	Votes	%	Votes	%	Votes	%
PA	33,957	52.10%	474,310	49.18%	4,312,157	51.12%
UNP	26,903	41.27%	425,185	44.08%	3,602,748	42.71%
JVP	2,976	4.57%	44,009	4.56%	343,927	4.08%
Other Parties (with < 1%)	1,346	2.06%	21,030	2.18%	176,679	2.09%
Valid Votes	65,182	97.76%	964,534	97.06%	8,435,754	97.69%
Rejected Votes	1,495	2.24%	29,197	2.94%	199,536	2.31%
Total Polled	66,677	75.84%	993,731	73.39%	8,635,290	72.17%
Registered Electors	87,913		1,354,025		11,965,536	

=== 1994 Sri Lankan Presidential Election ===
Party	Avissawella		Colombo Electoral District		Sri Lanka	
Party	Votes	%	Votes	%	Votes	%
PA	31,132	55.86%	557,708	64.82%	4,709,205	62.28%
UNP	23,126	41.50%	288,741	33.56%	2,715,283	35.91%
SMBP	787	1.41%	6,059	0.70%	32,651	0.43%
Other Parties (with < 1%)	683	1.23%	7,878	0.92%	104,389	1.38%
Valid Votes	55,728	97.70%	860,386	98.17%	7,561,526	98.03%
Rejected Votes	1,313	2.30%	16,060	1.83%	151,706	1.97%
Total Polled	57,041	70.24%	876,446	69.59%	7,713,232	69.12%
Registered Electors	81,213		1,259,484		11,158,880	

=== 1988 Sri Lankan Presidential Election ===
Party	Avissawella		Colombo Electoral District		Sri Lanka	
Party	Votes	%	Votes	%	Votes	%
UNP	24,292	49.36%	361,337	49.14%	2,569,199	50.43%
SLFP	23,721	48.20%	339,958	46.23%	2,289,857	44.95%
SLMP	1,199	2.44%	34,020	4.63%	235,701	4.63%
Valid Votes	49,212	98.86%	735,315	98.49%	5,094,754	98.24%
Rejected Votes	570	1.14%	11,295	1.51%	91,499	1.76%
Total Polled	49,782	72.26%	746,610	67.53%	5,186,256	55.87%
Registered Electors	68,892		1,105,583		9,283,143	

=== 1982 Sri Lankan Presidential Election ===
Party	Avissawella		Colombo Electoral District		Sri Lanka	
Party	Votes	%	Votes	%	Votes	%
UNP	26,648	50.92%	436,290	57.86%	3,450,815	52.93%
SLFP	23,481	44.87%	274,476	36.40%	2,546,348	39.05%
JVP	1,687	3.22%	28,580	3.79%	273,428	4.19%
Other Parties (with < 1%)	513	0.98%	14,685	1.95%	249,460	3.83%
Valid Votes	52,329	98.96%	754,031	98.95%	6,520,156	98.78%
Rejected Votes	551	1.04%	7,990	1.05%	80,470	1.22%
Total Polled	52,880	84.44%	762,021	76.88%	6,600,626	80.15%
Registered Electors	62,628		991,194		8,235,358	

== Parliamentary Election Results ==
=== Summary ===
The winner of Avissawella has matched the final country result 5 out of 7 times. Hence, Avissawella is a Weak Bellwether for Parliamentary Elections.

Year	Avissawella	Colombo Electoral District	MAE %	Sri Lanka	MAE %
2015	UPFA	UNP	8.35%	UNP	3.28%
2010	UPFA	UPFA	11.34%	UPFA	4.15%
2004	UPFA	UNP	7.58%	UPFA	3.47%
2001	UNP	UNP	5.46%	UNP	2.17%
2000	PA	UNP	6.47%	PA	2.53%
1994	UNP	PA	11.49%	PA	8.74%
1989	UNP	UNP	11.45%	UNP	10.09%
Matches/Mean MAE	5/7	5/7	8.88%	7/7	4.92%

=== 2020 Sri Lankan Parliamentary Election ===
Party	Avissawella		Colombo Electoral District		Sri Lanka	
Party	Votes	%	Votes	%	Votes	%
SLPFA	58,477	67.93%	674,603	57.04%	6,853,693	59.09%
SJB	20,308	23.59%	387,145	32.73%	2,771,984	23.9%
JJB	3,761	4.37%	67,600	5.72%	445,958	3.84%
UNP	1,712	1.99%	30,875	2.61%	249,435	2.15%
Other Parties (with < 1%)	1,823	2.12%	22,553	1.9%	1,227,859	11.02%
Valid Votes	86,081	70.41%	1,182,776	69.2%	11,598,936	71.32%
Rejected Votes	6,907	5.65%	81,034	4.74%	744,373	4.58%
Total Polled	92,988	76.06%	1,263,810	73.94%	12,343,309	75.89%
Registered Electors	122,257		1,709,209		16,263,885	

=== 2015 Sri Lankan Parliamentary Election ===
Party	Avissawella		Colombo Electoral District		Sri Lanka	
Party	Votes	%	Votes	%	Votes	%
UPFA	42,895	49.38%	474,063	39.25%	4,732,664	42.48%
UNP	39,106	45.02%	640,743	53.04%	5,098,916	45.77%
JVP	4,346	5.00%	81,391	6.74%	544,154	4.88%
Other Parties (with < 1%)	513	0.59%	11,752	0.97%	93,045	0.84%
Valid Votes	86,860	95.50%	1,207,949	96.46%	11,140,333	95.35%
Rejected Votes	4,044	4.45%	43,372	3.46%	516,926	4.42%
Total Polled	90,952	77.42%	1,252,271	78.93%	11,684,111	77.66%
Registered Electors	117,472		1,586,598		15,044,490	

=== 2010 Sri Lankan Parliamentary Election ===
Party	Avissawella		Colombo Electoral District		Sri Lanka	
Party	Votes	%	Votes	%	Votes	%
UPFA	42,259	65.27%	480,896	51.23%	4,846,388	60.38%
UNP	16,730	25.84%	339,750	36.19%	2,357,057	29.37%
DNA	5,432	8.39%	110,683	11.79%	441,251	5.50%
Other Parties (with < 1%)	327	0.51%	7,292	0.78%	48,240	0.60%
Valid Votes	64,748	93.79%	938,723	94.85%	8,026,322	96.03%
Rejected Votes	4,225	6.12%	50,354	5.09%	581,465	6.96%
Total Polled	69,035	63.84%	989,729	64.17%	8,358,246	59.29%
Registered Electors	108,138		1,542,457		14,097,690	

=== 2004 Sri Lankan Parliamentary Election ===
Party	Avissawella		Colombo Electoral District		Sri Lanka	
Party	Votes	%	Votes	%	Votes	%
UPFA	37,380	51.57%	414,688	39.20%	4,223,126	45.70%
UNP	28,607	39.46%	441,841	41.77%	3,486,792	37.73%
JHU	5,952	8.21%	190,618	18.02%	552,723	5.98%
Other Parties (with < 1%)	552	0.76%	10,713	1.01%	90,868	0.98%
Valid Votes	72,491	95.39%	1,057,860	96.47%	9,241,931	94.52%
Rejected Votes	3,491	4.59%	38,605	3.52%	534,452	5.47%
Total Polled	75,991	77.53%	1,096,571	74.71%	9,777,821	75.74%
Registered Electors	98,012		1,467,751		12,909,631	

=== 2001 Sri Lankan Parliamentary Election ===
Party	Avissawella		Colombo Electoral District		Sri Lanka	
Party	Votes	%	Votes	%	Votes	%
UNP	32,784	46.46%	546,417	51.62%	4,086,026	45.62%
PA	29,176	41.35%	353,401	33.39%	3,330,815	37.19%
JVP	7,121	10.09%	117,404	11.09%	815,353	9.10%
Other Parties (with < 1%)	1,484	2.10%	41,259	3.90%	561,281	6.27%
Valid Votes	70,565	95.50%	1,058,481	96.28%	8,955,844	94.77%
Rejected Votes	3,324	4.50%	40,901	3.72%	494,009	5.23%
Total Polled	73,889	78.92%	1,099,382	76.31%	9,449,878	76.03%
Registered Electors	93,630		1,440,682		12,428,762	

=== 2000 Sri Lankan Parliamentary Election ===
Party	Avissawella		Colombo Electoral District		Sri Lanka	
Party	Votes	%	Votes	%	Votes	%
PA	33,986	49.88%	394,146	38.86%	3,899,329	45.33%
UNP	26,671	39.15%	440,684	43.45%	3,451,765	40.12%
JVP	4,434	6.51%	78,133	7.70%	518,725	6.03%
Other Parties (with < 1%)	1,121	1.65%	46,998	4.63%	352,098	4.09%
SU	1,086	1.59%	49,671	4.90%	127,859	1.49%
CWC	832	1.22%	4,588	0.45%	22,985	0.27%
Valid Votes	68,130	N/A	1,014,220	N/A	8,602,617	N/A

=== 1994 Sri Lankan Parliamentary Election ===
Party	Avissawella		Colombo Electoral District		Sri Lanka	
Party	Votes	%	Votes	%	Votes	%
UNP	28,768	46.30%	385,100	41.77%	3,498,370	44.04%
PA	20,782	33.45%	469,642	50.94%	3,887,805	48.94%
MEP	11,846	19.07%	42,734	4.64%	68,538	0.86%
Other Parties (with < 1%)	738	1.19%	24,457	2.65%	142,073	1.79%
Valid Votes	62,134	95.57%	921,933	96.18%	7,943,688	95.20%
Rejected Votes	2,882	4.43%	36,635	3.82%	400,395	4.80%
Total Polled	65,016	80.06%	958,568	76.04%	8,344,095	74.75%
Registered Electors	81,213		1,260,686		11,163,064	

=== 1989 Sri Lankan Parliamentary Election ===
Party	Avissawella		Colombo Electoral District		Sri Lanka	
Party	Votes	%	Votes	%	Votes	%
UNP	23,462	47.23%	374,530	51.67%	2,838,005	50.71%
MEP	20,225	40.71%	76,966	10.62%	90,480	1.62%
SLFP	4,131	8.32%	205,053	28.29%	1,785,369	31.90%
ELJP	1,172	2.36%	7,112	0.98%	67,723	1.21%
USA	523	1.05%	31,873	4.40%	141,983	2.54%
Other Parties (with < 1%)	168	0.34%	29,308	4.04%	202,016	3.61%
Valid Votes	49,681	95.21%	724,842	95.36%	5,596,468	93.87%
Rejected Votes	2,500	4.79%	35,271	4.64%	365,563	6.13%
Total Polled	52,181	76.91%	760,113	69.87%	5,962,031	63.60%
Registered Electors	67,851		1,087,891		9,374,164	

== Demographics ==
=== Ethnicity ===
The Avissawella Polling Division has a Sinhalese majority (90.9%) . In comparison, the Colombo Electoral District (which contains the Avissawella Polling Division) has a Sinhalese majority (76.5%), a significant Moor population (10.7%) and a significant Sri Lankan Tamil population (10.1%)

Ethnicity in Avissawella
1. Sinhalese (90.9%)
2. Indian Tamil (4.50%)
3. Sri Lankan Tamil (3.20%)
4. Moor (1.10%)
5. Other (0.20%)

=== Religion ===
The Avissawella Polling Division has a Buddhist majority (86.3%) . In comparison, the Colombo Electoral District (which contains the Avissawella Polling Division) has a Buddhist majority (70.2%) and a significant Muslim population (11.8%)

Religion in Avissawella
1. Buddhist (86.3%)
2. Hindu (6.10%)
3. Roman Catholic (5.00%)
4. Other Christian (1.40%)
5. Muslim (1.20%)
6. Other (0.00%)
